= List of IC objects =

This is a partial list of IC objects, which are astronomical objects included in the Index Catalogue of Nebulae and Clusters of Stars. This two volume catalog was published in 1895 and 1908 by J. E. L. Dreyer.

The constellation information for this table is available from the NGC2000.0: Complete New General Catalog and Index Catalog. In some cases, the NASA/IPAC Extragalactic Database was used to confirm cross-identifications of galaxies. The remaining data is from the SIMBAD Astronomical Database unless otherwise noted.

== 1–999 ==
IC number	Other names	Object type	Constellation	Right ascension (J2000)	Declination (J2000)	Apparent magnitude (passband)
1	Struve 1	Binary Star System	Pegasus	00h 09m 46s	+27° 51’ 34”	13+13
2	LEDA 778	spiral galaxy	Cetus	00^{h} 11^{m} 00.9^{s}	−12° 49′ 22″	15.0 (B)
3	LEDA 836	elliptical galaxy	Pisces	00^{h} 12^{m} 06.0^{s}	−00° 24′ 54.8″	15.1 (B)
4	UGC 123	spiral galaxy	Pegasus	00^{h} 13^{m} 26.9^{s}	+17° 29′ 11.2″	14.2 (B)
10	UGC 192	irregular galaxy	Cassiopeia	00^{h} 20^{m} 25.50^{s}	+59° 18′ 17.0″	13.6 (B)
15	LEDA 165498	spiral galaxy	Cetus	00^{h} 27^{m} 57.6^{s}	−00° 03′ 41″	15.9 (B)
26	NGC 135	lenticular galaxy	Cetus	00^{h} 31^{m} 45.95^{s}	−13° 20′ 14.6″	15.0 (B)
32	LEDA 2096	spiral galaxy	Cetus	00^{h} 35^{m} 01.7^{s}	−02° 08′ 30″	15.0 (B)
33	LEDA 2101	spiral galaxy	Cetus	00^{h} 35^{m} 05.1^{s}	−02° 08′ 16″	15.0 (B)
39	NGC 178	Magellanic spiral galaxy	Cetus	00^{h} 39^{m} 08.39^{s}	−14° 10′ 22.3″	13.6 (B)
42	LEDA 2463	barred spiral galaxy	Cetus	00^{h} 41^{m} 05.8^{s}	−15° 25′ 41″	15.0 (B)
44	NGC 223	spiral galaxy	Cetus	00^{h} 42^{m} 15.88^{s}	+00° 50′ 43.7″	14.2 (B)
51	PGC 2710	polar-ring galaxy	Cetus	00^{h} 46^{m} 24.23^{s}	−13° 26′ 32.1″	13.4 (V)
59	Sh 2-185	reflection nebula	Cassiopeia	00^{h} 57^{m} 42.40^{s}	+61° 04′ 59.8″	
63		emission nebula	Cassiopeia	00^{h} 59^{m} 01.37^{s}	+60° 53′ 17.8″	13.3 (B)
64	UGC 613	lenticular galaxy	Pisces	00^{h} 59^{m} 24.42^{s}	+27° 03′ 32.6″	15.6 (B)
70	LEDA 173286	lenticular galaxy	Cetus	01^{h} 01^{m} 03.9^{s}	+00° 03′ 03″	8.31 (B)
88	LEDA 1175571	spiral galaxy	Cetus	01^{h} 14^{m} 31.3^{s}	+00° 47′ 30″	18.8 (B)
89	NGC 446	lenticular galaxy	Pisces	01^{h} 16^{m} 03.63^{s}	+04° 17′ 39.0″	13.8 (B)
95	LEDA 950887	elliptical galaxy	Cetus	01^{h} 19^{m} 17.9^{s}	−12° 34′ 27″	15.9 (B)
101	UGC 949	spiral galaxy	Pisces	01^{h} 24^{m} 08.55^{s}	+09° 55′ 49.9″	15.1 (B)
102	UGC 954	lenticular galaxy	Pisces	01^{h} 24^{m} 26.3^{s}	+09° 53′ 11.6″	15.6 (B)
106	NGC 530	lenticular galaxy	Cetus	01^{h} 24^{m} 41.66^{s}	−01° 35′ 13.6″	14.0 (B)
108	LEDA 5205	spiral galaxy	Cetus	01^{h} 24^{m} 38.9^{s}	−12° 38′ 08″	15.0 (B)
158	LEDA 144318	elliptical galaxy	Cetus	01^{h} 45^{m} 53.5^{s}	−06° 56′ 08″	15.6 (B)
165	NGC 684	spiral galaxy	Triangulum	01^{h} 50^{m} 14.03^{s}	+27° 38′ 44.4″	13.2 (B)
167	UGC 1313	barred spiral galaxy	Aries	01^{h} 51^{m} 08.56^{s}	+21° 54′ 46.1″	14.0 (B)
189	LEDA 7716	barred spiral galaxy	Aries	02^{h} 01^{m} 52.9^{s}	+23° 33′ 05″	13.7 (B)
226	UGC 1922	spiral galaxy	Triangulum	02^{h} 27^{m} 45.84^{s}	+28° 12′ 33.07″	13.7 (V)
239	UGC 2080	spiral galaxy	Andromeda	02^{h} 36^{m} 27.83^{s}	+38° 58′ 09.1″	11.0 (V)
282	NGC 1198	elliptical galaxy	Perseus	03^{h} 06^{m} 13.24^{s}	+41° 50′ 56.1″	14.0 (B)
289		planetary nebula	Cassiopeia	03^{h} 10^{m} 19.30^{s}	+61° 19′ 00.9″	16.8 (B)
298	Arp 147	interacting galaxies	Cetus	03^{h} 11^{m} 18.90^{s}	+01° 18′ 53.0″	15.5 (B)
310	UGC 2624	lenticular galaxy	Perseus	03^{h} 16^{m} 42.98^{s}	+41° 19′ 29.6″	14.3 (B)
335	LEDA 13277	lenticular galaxy	Fornax	03^{h} 35^{m} 31.07^{s}	−34° 26′ 49.4″	12.9 (B)
342	UGC 2847	intermediate spiral galaxy	Camelopardalis	03^{h} 46^{m} 48.51^{s}	+68° 05′ 46.0″	10.5 (B)
348	Collinder 41	open cluster	Perseus	03^{h} 44^{m} 31.7^{s}	+32° 09′ 32″	7.3 (V)
349	Ced 19i	reflection nebula	Taurus	03^{h} 46^{m} 21.3^{s}	+23° 56′ 28″	4 (V)
361	Collinder 48	open cluster	Camelopardalis	04^{h} 18^{m} 56.6^{s}	+58° 15′ 07″	11.7 (V)
405	Sh 2-229	emission/reflection nebula	Auriga	05^{h} 17^{m} 24.0^{s}	+34° 23′ 00″	~6 (V)
418		planetary nebula	Lepus	05^{h} 27^{m} 28.21^{s}	−12° 41′ 50.3″	9.0 (V)
434		H II region	Orion	05^{h} 41^{m} 00.0^{s}	−02° 30′ 00″	4.5 (V)
438	UGCA 115	spiral galaxy	Lepus	05^{h} 53^{m} 00.0676^{s}	−17° 52′ 33.684″	12.74 (V)
443	Sh 2-248	supernova remnant	Gemini	06^{h} 17^{m} 00.0^{s}	+22° 34′ 12″	
444		reflection nebula	Gemini	06^{h} 18^{m} 34.0^{s}	+23° 18′ 48″	7.0 (B)
447		reflection nebula	Monoceros	06^{h} 31^{m} 00.0^{s}	10° 06′ 00″	7.7 (B)
485	LEDA 22443	spiral galaxy	Gemini	08^{h} 00^{m} 19.75^{s}	+26° 42′ 04.99″	15.5 (B)
487	NGC 2494	lenticular galaxy	Monoceros	07^{h} 59^{m} 07.12^{s}	−00° 38′ 16.3″	14.2 (B)
535	LEDA 26524	elliptical galaxy	Hydra	09^{h} 22^{m} 16.2^{s}	−01° 02′ 25.3″	15.6 (B)
629	NGC 3312	spiral galaxy	Hydra	10^{h} 37^{m} 02.52^{s}	−27° 33′ 53.9″	14.0 (V)
694	Arp 299	interacting galaxies	Ursa Major	11^{h} 28^{m} 27.31^{s}	+58° 34′ 42.3″	18.2 (B)
755	NGC 4019	barred spiral galaxy	Coma Berenices	11^{h} 28^{m} 27.31^{s}	+58° 34′ 42.3″	18.2 (B)
757	NGC 4068	dwarf irregular galaxy	Ursa Major	12^{h} 04^{m} 2.49^{s}	+52° 35′ 26″	13.3 (B)
758	UGC 7056	barred spiral galaxy	Ursa Major	12^{h} 04^{m} 11.9363^{s}	+62° 30′ 19.199″	14.2 (B)
805	NGC 4611	intermediate spiral galaxy	Coma Berenices	12^{h} 41^{m} 25.44^{s}	+13° 43′ 46.2″	15.1 (B)
819/820	NGC 4676	interacting galaxies	Coma Berenices	12^{h} 46^{m} 10.18^{s}	+30° 43′ 53.7″	14.1 (B)
831	LEDA 43708	elliptical galaxy	Coma Berenices	12^{h} 52^{m} 44.07^{s}	+26° 28′ 13.5″	15.5 (B)
860	LEDA 46086	barred spiral galaxy	Coma Berenices	13^{h} 15^{m} 03.50^{s}	+24° 37′ 07.79″	14.8 (B)
883	Arp 193	irregular galaxy	Canes Venatici	13^{h} 20^{m} 35.4^{s}	+34° 08′ 22″	14.8 (B)
923	LEDA 3483133	lenticular galaxy	Ursa Major	13^{h} 43^{m} 14.18^{s}	+55° 36′ 11.3″	16.0 (B)
924	LEDA 170293	spiral galaxy	Virgo	13^{h} 45^{m} 37.6^{s}	−12° 27′ 18″	15.4 (B)
961	Mrk 664	spiral galaxy	Boötes	13^{h} 55^{m} 46.8^{s}	+25° 50′ 25″	15.5 (B)

== 1000–1999 ==
IC number	Other names	Object type	Constellation	Right ascension (J2000)	Declination (J2000)	Apparent magnitude (passband)
1011	LEDA 51662	barred spiral galaxy	Virgo	14^{h} 28^{m} 04.53^{s}	+01° 00′ 22.6″	14.7 (B)
1015	LEDA 51686	interacting galaxies	Boötes	14^{h} 28^{m} 19.2^{s}	+15° 25′ 12″	15.2 (B)
1047	LEDA 52522	spiral galaxy	Boötes	14^{h} 42^{m} 19.9^{s}	+19° 11′ 31″	15.7 (B)
1050	LEDA 52630	spiral galaxy	Boötes	14^{h} 44^{m} 07.1^{s}	+18° 00′ 45″	15.1 (B)
1061	LEDA 95545	lenticular galaxy	Boötes	14^{h} 51^{m} 14.2^{s}	+18° 45′ 27″	16.2 (B)
1065	3C 305	lenticular galaxy	Draco	14^{h} 49^{m} 21.59^{s}	+63° 16′ 13.8″	16.4 (V)
1067	UGC 9574	spiral galaxy	Virgo	14^{h} 53^{m} 02.8^{s}	+03° 17′ 46″	13.6 (B)
1101	UGC 9752	lenticular galaxy	Virgo	15^{h} 10^{m} 56.10^{s}	+05° 44′ 41.2″	15.1 (B)
1103	LEDA 1584180	elliptical galaxy	Serpens	15^{h} 11^{m} 35.8^{s}	+19° 12′ 28.0″	
1108	NGC 5882	planetary nebula	Lupus	15^{h} 16^{m} 49.97^{s}	−45° 38′ 58.6″	10.9 (V)
1111	NGC 5876	barred spiral galaxy	Boötes	15^{h} 09^{m} 31.57^{s}	+54° 30′ 23.4″	13.9 (B)
1127	Arp 220	interacting galaxies	Serpens	15^{h} 34^{m} 57.22^{s}	+23° 30′ 11.6″	13.9 (V)
1166	Mrk 867	pair of galaxies	Corona Borealis	16^{h} 02^{m} 08.92^{s}	+26° 19′ 45.6″	16.8 (V)
1172	NGC 6044	lenticular galaxy	Hercules	16^{h} 06^{m} 33.13^{s}	+17° 46′ 32.8″	15.5 (B)
1176	NGC 6056	barred lenticular galaxy	Hercules	16^{h} 05^{m} 31.28^{s}	+17° 57′ 49.1″	15.1 (B)
1179	Arp 272	barred spiral galaxy	Hercules	16^{h} 05^{m} 22.22^{s}	+17° 45′ 15.1″	15 (B)
1182	UGC 10192	lenticular galaxy	Hercules	16^{h} 05^{m} 36.80^{s}	+17° 48′ 07.4″	15.2 (V)
1183	NGC 6054	barred lenticular galaxy	Hercules	16^{h} 05^{m} 38.15^{s}	+17° 46′ 04.4″	15.6 (B)
1185	LEDA 57096	spiral galaxy	Hercules	16^{h} 05^{m} 44.69^{s}	+17° 43′ 01.3″	15.1 (B)
1189	LEDA 57135	lenticular galaxy	Hercules	16^{h} 06^{m} 14.83^{s}	+18° 10′ 58.4″	15.5 (B)
1192	LEDA 57157	barred spiral galaxy	Hercules	16^{h} 06^{m} 33.13^{s}	+17° 46′ 32.8″	15.5 (B)
1295		planetary nebula	Scutum	18^{h} 54^{m} 37.15^{s}	−08° 49′ 37.4″	12.7 (V)
1318	Sadr Region	emission nebula	Cygnus	20^{h} 16^{m} 48.0^{s}	+41° 57′ 24″	
1327	LEDA 65027	lenticular galaxy	Aquila	20^{h} 35^{m} 41.28^{s}	−00° 00′ 20.6″	15.0 (B)
1337	LEDA 65760	intermediate spiral galaxy	Capricornus	20^{h} 56^{m} 52.70^{s}	−16° 35′ 08.8″	14.5 (B)
1340		supernova remnant	Cygnus	20^{h} 45^{m} 38.0^{s}	+30° 42′ 30″	
1382	NGC 7056	barred spiral galaxy	Pegasus	21^{h} 22^{m} 07.51^{s}	+18° 39′ 56.6″	13.1 (V)
1396	Trumpler 37	emission nebula	Cepheus	21^{h} 38^{m} 58.8^{s}	+57° 30′ 50″	3.5 (V)
1459	LEDA 70090	elliptical galaxy	Grus	22^{h} 57^{m} 10.61^{s}	−36° 27′ 44.0″	11.9 (V)
1511	NGC 7767	lenticular galaxy	Pegasus	23^{h} 50^{m} 56.37^{s}	+27° 05′ 13.7″	14.2 (B)
1539	NGC 70	spiral galaxy	Andromeda	00^{h} 18^{m} 22.57^{s}	+30° 04′ 46.3″	14.5 (B)
1563	NGC 191A	lenticular galaxy	Cetus	00^{h} 39^{m} 00.24^{s}	−09° 00′ 52.4″	15 (B)
1565	UGC 410	elliptical galaxy	Pisces	00^{h} 39^{m} 26.2^{s}	+06° 44′ 03.3″	14.4 (B)
1567	Same as IC 1565					
1574	LEDA 2578	irregular galaxy	Cetus	00^{h} 43^{m} 03.82^{s}	−22° 14′ 48.8″	14.7 (B)
1590	Collinder 8	open cluster	Cassiopeia	00^{h} 52^{m} 49.2^{s}	+56° 37′ 44″	
1591	NGC 276	barred spiral galaxy	Cetus	00^{h} 52^{m} 06.58^{s}	−22° 40′ 48.4″	15.8 (B)
1613	UGC 668	irregular dwarf galaxy	Cetus	01^{h} 04^{m} 48.41^{s}	+02° 07′ 10.2″	10.0 (V)
1623		galaxy merger	Cetus	01^{h} 07^{m} 47.38^{s}	−17° 30′ 24.5″	15 (B)
1634	UGC 740	elliptical galaxy	Pisces	01^{h} 11^{m} 03.8^{s}	+17° 39′ 47″	15.2 (B)
1635	UGC 739	elliptical galaxy	Pisces	01^{h} 11^{m} 03.5^{s}	+17° 39′ 07″	17.2 (B)
1653	NGC 443	lenticular galaxy	Pisces	01^{h} 15^{m} 07.61^{s}	+33° 22′ 38.1″	13.9 (B)
1656	NGC 447	spiral galaxy	Pisces	01^{h} 15^{m} 37.65^{s}	+33° 04′ 04.1″	14.0 (B)
1658	NGC 444	spiral galaxy	Pisces	01^{h} 15^{m} 49.58^{s}	+31° 04′ 48.8″	14.7 (B)
1661	NGC 451	spiral galaxy	Pisces	01^{h} 16^{m} 07.21^{s}	+33° 05′ 21.7″	15.0 (V)
1686	NGC 499	lenticular galaxy	Pisces	01^{h} 16^{m} 07.21^{s}	+33° 05′ 21.7″	15.0 (V)
1710	NGC 575	barred spiral galaxy	Pisces	01^{h} 30^{m} 46.65^{s}	+21° 26′ 25.5″	13.0 (V)
1712	NGC 584	elliptical galaxy	Cetus	01^{h} 31^{m} 20.72^{s}	−06° 52′ 04.8″	11.4 (B)
1743	NGC 716	barred spiral galaxy	Aries	01^{h} 52^{m} 59.65^{s}	+12° 42′ 30.7″	14.0 (B)
1744	NGC 719	lenticular galaxy	Aries	01^{h} 53^{m} 38.86^{s}	+19° 50′ 25.7″	14.7 (B)
1757	LEDA 174458	elliptical galaxy?	Cetus	01^{h} 57^{m} 11.36^{s}	−00° 28′ 26.3″	16.8 (B)
1766	NGC 785	elliptical galaxy	Triangulum	02^{h} 01^{m} 40.02^{s}	+31° 49′ 35.4″	13.9 (B)
1773	NGC 804	lenticular galaxy	Triangulum	02^{h} 04^{m} 02.12^{s}	+30° 49′ 58.7″	14.7 (B)
1782	NGC 823	lenticular galaxy	Fornax	02^{h} 07^{m} 20.07^{s}	−25° 26′ 31.0″	13.6 (B)
1801	UGC 1936	barred spiral	Aries	02^{h} 28^{m} 12.75^{s}	+19° 34′ 60.0″	14.0 (V)
1805	Collinder 26	open cluster	Cassiopeia	02^{h} 32^{m} 50.4^{s}	+61° 28′ 16″	18.3 (V)
1816	PGC 9634	barred spiral galaxy	Fornax	02^{h} 31^{m} 50.97^{s}	−36° 40′ 19.6″	13.1 (V)
1848	Collinder 32	open cluster	Cassiopeia	02^{h} 51^{m} 25.2^{s}	+60° 25′ 08″	6.5 (V)
1907	NGC 1278	elliptical galaxy	Perseus	03^{h} 19^{m} 34.24^{s}	+41° 34′ 49.8″	15.2 (B)
1919	LEDA 12825	elliptical galaxy	Fornax	03^{h} 26^{m} 02.21^{s}	−32° 53′ 40.3″	13.8 (B)
1953	LEDA 13184	barred spiral galaxy	Eridanus	03^{h} 33^{m} 41.89^{s}	−21° 28′ 43.0″	12.4 (B)
1963	Same as IC 335					
1993	LEDA 13840	intermediate spiral galaxy	Fornax	03^{h} 47^{m} 04.84^{s}	−33° 42′ 35.9″	12.5 (B)
1988	LEDA 13602	spiral galaxy	Fornax	03^{h} 42^{m} 11.48^{s}	−29° 53′ 36.2″	11.6 (B)

== 2000–2999 ==
IC number	Other names	Object type	Constellation	Right ascension (J2000)	Declination (J2000)	Apparent magnitude (passband)
2006	LEDA 14077	elliptical galaxy	Eridanus	03^{h} 54^{m} 28.46^{s}	−35° 58′ 01.7″	12.4 (B)
2062	NGC 1560	spiral galaxy	Camelopardalis	04^{h} 32^{m} 49.09^{s}	+71° 52′ 59.2″	12.1 (B)
2118	NGC 1909	reflection nebula	Eridanus	05^{h} 02^{m} 00.0^{s}	−07° 54′ 00″	
2126	NGC 1935	emission nebula	Dorado	05^{h} 21^{m} 58.0^{s}	−67° 57′ 18″	
2127	NGC 1936	emission nebula	Dorado	05^{h} 22^{m} 12.53^{s}	−67° 58′ 31.9″	11.6 (V)
2133	NGC 1961	spiral galaxy	Camelopardalis	05^{h} 42^{m} 04.63^{s}	+69° 22′ 42.4″	11.0 (V)
2149		planetary nebula	Auriga	05^{h} 56^{m} 23.90^{s}	+46° 06′ 17.2″	11.4 (V)
2150	PGC 18000	Barred spiral galaxy	Columba	05^{h} 51^{m} 18.5787^{s}	−38° 19′ 13.952″	13.58 (V)
2154	NGC 2139	barred spiral galaxy	Lepus	06^{h} 01^{m} 07.96^{s}	−23° 40′ 20.4″	11.7 (V)
2163	LEDA 18751	barred spiral galaxy	Canis Major	06^{h} 16^{m} 27.97^{s}	−21° 22′ 33.1″	12.6 (B)
2169	Same as IC 447					
2177		reflection nebula	Monoceros	07^{h} 04^{m} 25.0^{s}	−10° 27′ 18″	
2220		reflection nebula	Carina	07^{h} 56^{m} 51.3^{s}	−59° 07′ 31″	
2233	UGC 4278	spiral galaxy	Lynx	08^{h} 13^{m} 58.91^{s}	+45° 44′ 31.7″	12.6 (V)
2391	Collinder 191	open cluster	Vela	08^{h} 41^{m} 10.1^{s}	−52° 59′ 28″	
2395	Collinder 192	open cluster	Vela	08^{h} 42^{m} 07.4^{s}	−48° 05′ 24″	4.6 (V)
2431	LEDA 25476	interacting galaxies	Cancer	09^{h} 04^{m} 35.38^{s}	+14° 35′ 43.6″	14.3 (B)
2448		planetary nebula	Carina	09^{h} 07^{m} 06.32^{s}	−69° 56′ 30.7″	11.1 (V)
2455	NGC 2804	lenticular galaxy	Cancer	09^{h} 16^{m} 50.01^{s}	+20° 11′ 54.6″	14.0 (B)
2486	UGC 5062	spiral galaxy	Leo	09^{h} 30^{m} 17.37^{s}	+26° 38′ 28.5″	15.1 (B)
2488	Collinder 208	open cluster	Vela	09^{h} 27^{m} 25.7^{s}	−57° 00′ 14″	7.4
2497	LEDA 165538	spiral galaxy	Leo Minor	09^{h} 41^{m} 04.10^{s}	+34° 43′ 58.2″	
2498	LEDA 27668	barred spiral galaxy	Leo	09^{h} 41^{m} 21.94^{s}	+28° 06′ 52.1″	15.3 (B)
2529	NGC 3081	ring galaxy	Hydra	09^{h} 59^{m} 29.54^{s}	−22° 49′ 34.7″	13.6 (V)
2531	PGC 28909	spiral galaxy	Antlia	09^{h} 59^{m} 55.50^{s}	−29° 37′ 03.2″	
2560	LEDA 29993	spiral galaxy	Antlia	10^{h} 16^{m} 18.71^{s}	−33° 33′ 49.7″	13.3 (V)
2571	NGC 3223	spiral galaxy	Antlia	10^{h} 21^{m} 35.08^{s}	−34° 16′ 00.5″	10.8 (V)
2574	UGC 5666	dwarf spiral galaxy	Ursa Major	10^{h} 28^{m} 23.61^{s}	+68° 24′ 43.4″	10.9 (V)
2585	NGC 3271	barred lenticular galaxy	Antlia	10^{h} 30^{m} 26.50^{s}	−35° 21′ 34.1″	11.7 (V)
2599		emission nebula	Carina	10^{h} 37^{m} 42.0^{s}	−58° 39′ 00″	
2602	Collinder 229	open cluster	Carina	10^{h} 42^{m} 27.1^{s}	−64° 25′ 34″	1.6 (V)
2628	LEDA 34038	barred spiral galaxy	Leo	11^{h} 11^{m} 37.87^{s}	+12° 07′ 19.2″	15.1 (B)
2613	UGC 5931	peculiar spiral galaxy	Leo Minor	10^{h} 49^{m} 50.12^{s}	+32° 58′ 58.4″	12.1 (V)
2631	Ced 112	reflection nebula	Chamaeleon	11^{h} 09^{m} 52.4^{s}	−76° 36′ 57″	
2700	LEDA 1402998	galaxy	Leo	11^{h} 17^{m} 54.2^{s}	+12° 03′ 15″	
2702	LEDA 1364735	elliptical galaxy	Leo	11^{h} 17^{m} 57.2^{s}	+09° 24′ 45″	
2722	LEDA 3769216	trio of galaxies	Leo	11^{h} 19^{m} 44.3^{s}	+13° 57′ 47″	
2729	LEDA 1430330	spiral galaxy	Leo	11^{h} 20^{m} 06.7^{s}	+13° 24′ 33.4″	
2714	Collinder 245	open cluster	Carina	11^{h} 17^{m} 29.5^{s}	−62° 43′ 08″	8.2 (V)
2734	LEDA 1409656	spiral galaxy	Leo	11^{h} 20^{m} 23.8^{s}	+12° 26′ 35″	
2744	LEDA 34833	lenticular galaxy	Ursa Major	11^{h} 21^{m} 42.5^{s}	+34° 21′ 46.0″	15.5 (B)
2754	LEDA 1450402	spiral galaxy	Leo	11^{h} 22^{m} 02.4^{s}	+14° 08′ 39″	
2759	LEDA 34882	elliptical galaxy	Leo	11^{h} 22^{m} 14.21^{s}	+24° 18′ 00.4″	15.5 (B)
2760	LEDA 1413842	elliptical galaxy	Leo	11^{h} 22^{m} 12.8^{s}	+12° 39′ 55″	
2768	LEDA 1411172	spiral galaxy	Leo	11^{h} 22^{m} 25.6^{s}	+12° 31′ 44″	
2800	LEDA 3543021	spiral galaxy	Leo	11^{h} 24^{m} 27.1^{s}	+12° 12′ 32″	
2801	LEDA 1375823	spiral galaxy	Leo	11^{h} 24^{m} 29.0^{s}	+10° 11′ 02″	
2816	LEDA 3472124	spiral galaxy	Leo	11^{h} 26^{m} 18.3^{s}	+10° 38′ 11″	
2835	LEDA 3090991	lenticular galaxy	Leo	11^{h} 27^{m} 31.6^{s}	+12° 08′ 34″	
2839	LEDA 3472295	spiral galaxy	Leo	11^{h} 27^{m} 45.4^{s}	+10° 49′ 11″	
2938	LEDA 35837	elliptical galaxy	Leo	11^{h} 35^{m} 36.30^{s}	+13° 40′ 50.57″	15.3 (B)
2944		open cluster	Centaurus	11^{h} 38^{m} 20.00^{s}	−63° 22′ 22.0″	8.5 (V)
2955	LEDA 36603	lenticular galaxy	Leo	11^{h} 45^{m} 03.89^{s}	+19° 37′ 14.1″	15.2 (B)

== 3000–3999 ==
IC number	Other names	Object type	Constellation	Right ascension (J2000)	Declination (J2000)	Apparent magnitude (passband)
3031	LEDA 92941	spiral galaxy	Coma Berenices	12^{h} 11^{m} 04.1^{s}	+13° 18′ 30.4″	
3038	LEDA 38920	spiral galaxy	Virgo	12^{h} 12^{m} 32.6^{s}	+11° 21′ 10″	15.7 (B)
3053	LEDA 39038	spiral galaxy	Coma Berenices	12^{h} 13^{m} 51.9^{s}	+14° 13′ 23″	15.7 (B)
3064	NGC 4206	spiral galaxy	Virgo	12^{h} 15^{m} 16.82^{s}	+13° 01′ 26.4″	12.2 (V)
3078	LEDA 39263	spiral galaxy	Virgo	12^{h} 16^{m} 00.04^{s}	+12° 41′ 14.2″	17.2 (V)
3108	LEDA 39449	spiral galaxy	Coma Berenices	12^{h} 17^{m} 42.7^{s}	+13° 22′ 48″	
3135	LEDA 89577	spiral galaxy	Coma Berenices	12^{h} 18^{m} 52.6^{s}	+27° 29′ 29″	
3189	LEDA 3098279	spiral galaxy	Coma Berenices	12^{h} 20^{m} 56.3^{s}	+25° 25′ 35.5″	
3207	LEDA 3787380	spiral galaxy	Coma Berenices	12^{h} 21^{m} 52.2^{s}	+24° 21′ 16″	
3222	UGC 7437	barred spiral galaxy	Coma Berenices	12^{h} 22^{m} 19.5^{s}	+28° 49′ 54″	15.9 (B)
3246	LEDA 40202	spiral galaxy	Virgo	12^{h} 23^{m} 17.1^{s}	+13° 03′ 07″	
3261	LEDA 40289	lenticular galaxy	Virgo	12^{h} 23^{m} 52.5^{s}	+11° 28′ 53″	
3269		spiral galaxy	Coma Berenices	12^{h} 24^{m} 04.4^{s}	+27° 26′ 05.1″	
3270		barred spiral galaxy	Coma Berenices	12^{h} 24^{m} 05.8^{s}	+27° 34′ 40.4″	
3272	LEDA 1684676	spiral galaxy	Coma Berenices	12^{h} 24^{m} 09.3^{s}	+23° 17′ 04.6″	
3278	LEDA 40345	trio of galaxies	Coma Berenices	12^{h} 24^{m} 14.9^{s}	+27° 25′ 15″	16.5 (B)
3283	LEDA 3788286	spiral galaxy	Coma Berenices	12^{h} 24^{m} 28.0^{s}	+27° 12′ 40″	
3286	LEDA 1692968	elliptical galaxy	Coma Berenices	12^{h} 24^{m} 34.5^{s}	+23° 44′ 52″	
3299	LEDA 3089319	spiral galaxy	Coma Berenices	12^{h} 25^{m} 03.1^{s}	+27° 22′ 28″	
3325	LEDA 3788769	barred spiral galaxy	Coma Berenices	12^{h} 25^{m} 51.4^{s}	+23° 53′ 45″	
3329	NGC 4393	spiral galaxy	Coma Berenices	12^{h} 25^{m} 51.32^{s}	+27° 33′ 38.8″	13.8 (B)
3339	NGC 4411	Barred spiral galaxy	Virgo	12^{h} 26^{m} 29.9337^{s}	+08° 52′ 19.121″	13.41 (V)
3340	LEDA 40708	spiral galaxy	Coma Berenices	12^{h} 26^{m} 32.7^{s}	+16° 50′ 41″	15.5 (B)
3359	LEDA 89605	spiral galaxy	Coma Berenices	12^{h} 26^{m} 51.4^{s}	+23° 29′ 53″	
3376	UGC 7578	barred spiral galaxy	Coma Berenices	12^{h} 27^{m} 50.3^{s}	+26° 59′ 36.6″	14.4 (B)
3379	LEDA 40955	spiral galaxy	Coma Berenices	12^{h} 28^{m} 04.2^{s}	+17° 28′ 21″	16.0 (B)
3390	LEDA 3789697	barred spiral galaxy	Coma Berenices	12^{h} 28^{m} 28.6^{s}	+24° 48′ 34″	
3401	LEDA 3089434	compact galaxy	Coma Berenices	12^{h} 28^{m} 58.8^{s}	+26° 27′ 36.3″	
3402	UGC 7616	spiral galaxy	Coma Berenices	12^{h} 28^{m} 59.3^{s}	+28° 51′ 43.0″	15.7 (B)
3403	LEDA 41105	spiral galaxy	Coma Berenices	12^{h} 29^{m} 01.4^{s}	+24° 37′ 58″	15.7 (B)
3418	UGC 7630	dwarf irregular galaxy	Virgo	12^{h} 29^{m} 43.92^{s}	+11° 24′ 16.9″	16.5 (B)
3430	UGC 7643	dwarf elliptical galaxy	Virgo	12^{h} 30^{m} 17^{s}	+09° 05′ 6.5″	15.4 (B)
3427	NGC 4482	dwarf elliptical galaxy	Virgo	12^{h} 30^{m} 10.32^{s}	+10° 46′ 46.1″	14.2 (B)
3438	NGC 4492	spiral galaxy	Virgo	12^{h} 30^{m} 59.71^{s}	+08° 04′ 40.4″	14.1 (B)
3441	LEDA 41412	lenticular galaxy	Coma Berenices	12^{h} 31^{m} 04.4^{s}	+28° 51′ 10″	15.1 (V)
3447	LEDA 165209	spiral galaxy	Virgo	12^{h} 31^{m} 17.90^{s}	+10° 40′ 48.5″	
3452	NGC 4497	lenticular galaxy	Virgo	12^{h} 31^{m} 32.52^{s}	+11° 37′ 28.97″	12.5 (V)
3491	LEDA 86322	spiral galaxy	Coma Berenices	12^{h} 33^{m} 08.9^{s}	+27° 05′ 39.8″	16.0 (B)
3505	LEDA 41792	barred spiral galaxy	Coma Berenices	12^{h} 34^{m} 10.32^{s}	+15° 58′ 05.67″	15.3 (B)
3507	LEDA 3089514	lenticular galaxy	Coma Berenices	12^{h} 34^{m} 04.4^{s}	+25° 21′ 46″	
3523	LEDA 169559	spiral galaxy	Coma Berenices	12^{h} 34^{m} 39.4^{s}	+14° 01′ 00″	
3528	LEDA 41882	spiral galaxy	Coma Berenices	12^{h} 34^{m} 55.90^{s}	+15° 33′ 56.4″	17.0 (V)
3545	NGC 4555	elliptical galaxy	Coma Berenices	12^{h} 35^{m} 41.19^{s}	+26° 31′ 23.1″	13.5 (B)
3568		planetary nebula	Camelopardalis	12^{h} 33^{m} 06.85^{s}	+82° 33′ 50.2″	10.7 (V)
3569	NGC 4561	spiral galaxy	Coma Berenices	12^{h} 36^{m} 08.14^{s}	+19° 19′ 21.3″	12.7 (B)
3583	UGC 7784	irregular galaxy	Virgo	12^{h} 36^{m} 43.56^{s}	+13° 15′ 32.9″	13.3 (B)
3588	NGC 4571	spiral galaxy	Coma Berenices	12^{h} 36^{m} 56.37^{s}	+14° 13′ 02.3″	13.6 (B)
3593	Mrk 776	seyfert 1 galaxy	Coma Berenices	12^{h} 36^{m} 53.9^{s}	+27° 44′ 57″	15.4 (B)
3601	LEDA 165275	lenticular galaxy	Coma Berenices	12^{h} 37^{m} 53.6^{s}	+15° 13′ 29″	
3606	LEDA 1412725	elliptical galaxy	Virgo	12^{h} 38^{m} 25.1^{s}	+12° 36′ 38″	
3622		barred spiral galaxy	Coma Berenices	12^{h} 39^{m} 32.49^{s}	+15° 25′ 55.3″	
3629	LEDA 42387	spiral galaxy	Coma Berenices	12^{h} 39^{m} 46.6^{s}	+13° 31′ 59.9″	15.2 (B)
3639	PGC 42504	barred spiral galaxy	Centaurus	12^{h} 40^{m} 52.8^{s}	−36° 45′ 21.0″	12.2 (V)
3667	NGC 4618	dwarf galaxy	Canes Venatici	12^{h} 41^{m} 32.90^{s}	+41° 09′ 03.2″	10.8 (V)
3675	NGC 4625	dwarf galaxy	Canes Venatici	12^{h} 41^{m} 52.71^{s}	+41° 16′ 26.1″	12.4 (V)
3683	LEDA 1637726	spiral galaxy	Coma Berenices	12^{h} 42^{m} 20.5^{s}	+20° 52′ 17″	
3688	NGC 4633	spiral galaxy	Coma Berenices	12^{h} 42^{m} 37.37^{s}	+14° 21′ 25.9″	14.7 (B)
3785	LEDA 3796270	lenticular galaxy	Coma Berenices	12^{h} 47^{m} 52.2^{s}	+19° 16′ 31″	
3786	LEDA 2142309	spiral galaxy	Canes Venatici	12^{h} 47^{m} 36.9^{s}	+39° 02′ 46″	
3789	LEDA 1619535	spiral galaxy	Coma Berenices	12^{h} 48^{m} 07.1^{s}	+20° 11′ 38.5″	
3833	NGC 4722	lenticular galaxy	Corvus	12^{h} 51^{m} 32.3681^{s}	−13° 19′ 47.993″	
3853	LEDA 2137536	spiral galaxy	Canes Venatici	12^{h} 53^{m} 10.3^{s}	+38° 49′ 45″	
3854	LEDA 2171843	pair of galaxies	Canes Venatici	12^{h} 53^{m} 14.5^{s}	+40° 50′ 53″	
3867	LEDA 87471	spiral galaxy	Coma Berenices	12^{h} 54^{m} 19.6^{s}	+18° 56′ 30″	
3870	LEDA 1668852	elliptical galaxy	Coma Berenices	12^{h} 54^{m} 21.5^{s}	+22° 22′ 54.1″	
3873	LEDA 1573410	spiral galaxy	Coma Berenices	12^{h} 54^{m} 31.6^{s}	+18° 52′ 58″	
3875	LEDA 1662288	spiral galaxy	Coma Berenices	12^{h} 54^{m} 37.2^{s}	+22° 02′ 11″	
3880	LEDA 1671124	spiral galaxy	Coma Berenices	12^{h} 54^{m} 47.9^{s}	+22° 30′ 08.0″	
3881	LEDA 43961	compact galaxy	Coma Berenices	12^{h} 54^{m} 53.9^{s}	+19° 07′ 04.9″	14.1 (B)
3928	LEDA 2165833	spiral galaxy	Canes Venatici	12^{h} 57^{m} 18.3^{s}	+40° 26′ 30″	
3934	LEDA 1571543	barred spiral galaxy	Coma Berenices	58^{h} 17.5^{m}	+18° 49′ 32″	
3948	LEDA 1698844	elliptical galaxy	Coma Berenices	12^{h} 58^{m} 58.1^{s}	+24° 03′ 41″	

== 4000–4999 ==
IC number	Other names	Object type	Constellation	Right ascension (J2000)	Declination (J2000)	Apparent magnitude (passband)
4000	LEDA 2152407	compact galaxy	Canes Venatici	12^{h} 59^{m} 36.6^{s}	+39° 35′ 16″	
4020	LEDA 2131719	spiral galaxy	Canes Venatici	13^{h} 00^{m} 03.4^{s}	+38° 36′ 36″	
4026	LEDA 44749	lenticular galaxy	Coma Berenices	13^{h} 00^{m} 22.14^{s}	+28° 02′ 49.2″	14.6 (V)
4037	LEDA 2141402	spiral galaxy	Canes Venatici	13^{h} 00^{m} 19.4^{s}	+39° 00′ 09″	
4040	LEDA 44789	barred spiral galaxy	Coma Berenices	13^{h} 00^{m} 37.86^{s}	+28° 03′ 28.7″	15.0 (V)
4051	LEDA 52810	elliptical galaxy	Coma Berenices	13^{h} 00^{m} 54.46^{s}	+28° 00′ 27.5″	13.2 (V)
4079	LEDA 1585609	spiral galaxy	Coma Berenices	13^{h} 01^{m} 56.8^{s}	+19° 14′ 56″	
4082	LEDA 2098435	elliptical galaxy	Canes Venatici	13^{h} 01^{m} 39.1^{s}	+37° 20′ 30″	
4100	UGC 8144	spiral galaxy	Canes Venatici	13^{h} 02^{m} 04.91^{s}	+40° 24′ 30.0″	15.1 (B)
4130	LEDA 45103	lenticular galaxy	Coma Berenices	13^{h} 03^{m} 46.6^{s}	+19° 16′ 18″	15.4 (B)
4141	LEDA 45147	spiral galaxy	Coma Berenices	13^{h} 04^{m} 07.73^{s}	+19° 12′ 38.4″	~17 (B)
4144	UGC 8169	spiral galaxy	Canes Venatici	13^{h} 03^{m} 50.0^{s}	+36° 56′ 36″	16.0 (B)
4145	LEDA 2122937	spiral galaxy	Canes Venatici	13^{h} 03^{m} 50.0^{s}	+38° 17′ 12″	
4182	UGC 8188	Magellanic spiral galaxy	Canes Venatici	13^{h} 05^{m} 48.75^{s}	+37° 36′ 13.0″	11.9 (B)
4214	LEDA 46304	Barred spiral galaxy	Centaurus	13^{h} 17^{m} 42.6934^{s}	−32° 06′ 05.898″	11.65
4271	LEDA 47334	spiral galaxy	Canes Venatici	13^{h} 29^{m} 21.45^{s}	+37° 24′ 50.5″	15.6 (B)
4274	NGC 5189	planetary nebula	Musca	13^{h} 33^{m} 32.88^{s}	−65° 58′ 27.0″	14.5 (B)
4338	NGC 5334	barred spiral galaxy	Virgo	13^{h} 52^{m} 54.48^{s}	−01° 06′ 52.0″	14.3 (V)
4381	NGC 5008	barred spiral galaxy	Boötes	14^{h} 10^{m} 57.24^{s}	+25° 29′ 50.1″	14.8 (B)
4397	UGC 9150	spiral galaxy	Boötes	14^{h} 17^{m} 58.7102^{s}	+26° 24′ 45.889″	14.14
4406		planetary nebula	Lupus	14^{h} 22^{m} 26.14^{s}	−44° 09′ 02.2″	10.9 (V)
4461	UGC 9384	spiral galaxy	Boötes	14^{h} 35^{m} 01.88^{s}	+26° 32′ 38.4″	15.3 (B)
4462	Arp 95	elliptical galaxy	Boötes	14^{h} 35^{m} 04.18^{s}	+26° 32′ 27.2″	15.3 (B)
4481	LEDA 1501729	barred spiral galaxy	Boötes	14^{h} 40^{m} 10.11^{s}	+16° 08′ 29.1″	15.7 (V)
4499		globular cluster	Apus	15^{h} 00^{m} 18.57^{s}	−82° 12′ 49.6″	8.6 (V)
4516	UGC 9587	elliptical galaxy	Boötes	14^{h} 54^{m} 23.47^{s}	+16° 21′ 18.8″	14.1 (V)
4537	LEDA 54583	lenticular galaxy	Serpens	15^{h} 17^{m} 32.45^{s}	+02° 02′ 50.6″	15.6 (B)
4539	LEDA 54642	intermediate spiral galaxy	Corona Borealis	15^{h} 18^{m} 31.15^{s}	+32° 23′ 34.3″	~15 (B)
4553	Same as IC 1127					
4588	LEDA 57022	elliptical galaxy	Serpens	16^{h} 04^{m} 56.67^{s}	+23° 55′ 57.6″	14.9 (B)
4592		reflection nebula	Scorpius	16^{h} 13^{m} 00.0^{s}	−19° 18′ 00″	3.9 (B)
4593		planetary nebula	Hercules	16^{h} 11^{m} 44.5^{s}	+12° 04′ 17″	10.7 (V)
4617	LEDA 2085077	spiral galaxy	Hercules	16^{h} 42^{m} 08.07^{s}	+36° 41′ 02.7″	12.647 (V)
4625	NGC 6240	ultraluminous infrared galaxy	Ophiuchus	16^{h} 52^{m} 58.9^{s}	+02° 24′ 03″	13.4 (V)
4628		emission nebula	Scorpius	16^{h} 56^{m} 54.67^{s}	−40° 30′ 44.4″	7.1 (V)
4651	Collinder 327	open cluster	Ara	17^{h} 24^{m} 50.9^{s}	−49° 55′ 01″	
4662	LEDA 60851	irregular galaxy	Pavo	17^{h} 47^{m} 09.19^{s}	−64° 38′ 19.3″	11.1 (V)
4665	Collinder 349	open cluster	Ophiuchus	17^{h} 46^{m} 13.0^{s}	+05° 36′ 54″	~15 (B)
4677		planetary nebula	Draco	17^{h} 58^{m} 15.8^{s}	+66° 37′ 59″	
4690	NGC 6589	reflection nebula	Sagittarius	18^{h} 16^{m} 50.4^{s}	−19° 53′ 24″	10.5 (B)
4703	Eagle Nebula	emission nebula	Serpens	18^{h} 18^{m} 45.1^{s}	−13° 47′ 31″	12.5 (B)
4710	LEDA 61922	irregular galaxy	Pavo	18^{h} 28^{m} 37.97^{s}	−66° 58′ 56.2″	
4715	Messier 24	star cloud	Sagittarius	18^{h} 16^{m} 48.0^{s}	−18° 33′ 00″	
4725	Messier 25	open cluster	Sagittarius	18^{h} 31^{m} 44.9^{s}	−19° 06′ 50″	4.6 (V)
4756	Melotte 210	open cluster	Serpens	18^{h} 38^{m} 35.8^{s}	+05° 26′ 06″	4.6 (V)
4765	Collinder 386	open cluster	Serpens	18^{h} 38^{m} 35.8^{s}	+05° 26′ 06″	4.6 (V)
4850	V606 Aquilae	classical nova	Aquila	19^{h} 20^{m} 24.3^{s}	−00° 08′ 07″	20.4 (V)
4895	NGC 6822	barred irregular galaxy	Sagittarius	19^{h} 44^{m} 56.20^{s}	−14° 47′ 51.3″	8.1 (V)
4948	NGC 6902	spiral galaxy	Sagittarius	20^{h} 24^{m} 28.07^{s}	−43° 39′ 12.4″	10.9 (V)
4970	LEDA 63616	unbarred lenticular galaxy	Pavo	20^{h} 16^{m} 57.35^{s}	−70° 44′ 59.1″	13.9 (V)
4997		planetary nebula	Delphinus	20^{h} 20^{m} 08.76^{s}	+16° 43′ 53.7″	11.2 (V)

== 5000–5386 ==
IC number	Other names	Object type	Constellation	Right ascension (J2000)	Declination (J2000)	Apparent magnitude (passband)
5015	NGC 6925	unbarred spiral galaxy	Microscopium	20^{h} 34^{m} 20.57^{s}	−31° 58′ 51.1″	11.3 (V)
5052	LEDA 65603	barred spiral galaxy	Pavo	20^{h} 52^{m} 01.63^{s}	−69° 11′ 35.9″	11.7 (V)
5063	LEDA 65600	lenticular galaxy	Indus	20^{h} 52^{m} 02.15^{s}	−57° 04′ 06.7″	12.9 (V)
5067		lost object	Cygnus	20^{h} 47^{m} 54.0^{s}	+44° 22′ 00″	
5070	Pelican Nebula	H II region	Cygnus	20^{h} 51^{m} 0.0^{s}	+44° 22′ 00″	8.0 (V)
5082	NGC 7010	elliptical galaxy	Aquarius	21^{h} 04^{m} 36.0^{s}	−12° 20′ 00″	~14 (B)
5121	NGC 7096	grand design spiral galaxy	Indus	21^{h} 41^{m} 19.24^{s}	−63° 54′ 31.2″	11.6 (V)
5135	NGC 7130	spiral galaxy	Piscis Austrinus	21^{h} 48^{m} 19.54^{s}	−34° 57′ 04.5″	13.9 (V)
5145	UGC 11844	spiral galaxy	Pegasus	21^{h} 54^{m} 23.07^{s}	+15° 09′ 25.0″	14.7 (B)
5146	Collinder 470	open cluster	Cygnus	21^{h} 53^{m} 29.3^{s}	+47° 14′ 46″	7.2 (V)
5148		planetary nebula	Grus	21^{h} 59^{m} 35.09^{s}	−39° 23′ 08.2″	16.5 (V)
5152	LEDA 67908	irregular galaxy	Indus	22^{h} 02^{m} 41.52^{s}	−51° 17′ 47.2″	10.9 (V)
5174		barred spiral galaxy	Grus	22^{h} 12^{m} 44.659^{s}	−38° 10′ 17.555″	14.63 (B)
5201	LEDA 68618	barred spiral galaxy	Grus	22^{h} 20^{m} 57.44^{s}	−46° 02′ 09.1″	11.5 (B)
5217	HD 212534	planetary nebula	Lacerta	22^{h} 23^{m} 55.72^{s}	+50° 58′ 00.5″	12.6 (V)
5228	NGC 7302	lenticular galaxy	Aquarius	22^{h} 32^{m} 23.81^{s}	−14° 07′ 14.1″	~13 (B)
5265	Same as IC 1459					
5281	NGC 7466	spiral galaxy	Pegasus	23^{h} 02^{m} 03.47^{s}	+27° 03′ 09.2″	14.4 (V)
5294	NGC 7552	barred spiral galaxy	Grus	23^{h} 16^{m} 10.66^{s}	−42° 35′ 04.7″	10.6 (V)
5316	LEDA 1645026	elliptical galaxy	Pegasus	23^{h} 21^{m} 54.1^{s}	+21° 12′ 09″	
5332	LEDA 71775	intermediate spiral galaxy	Sculptor	23^{h} 34^{m} 27.49^{s}	−36° 06′ 03.9″	10.7 (V)
5336	LEDA 1642748	interacting galaxies	Pegasus	23^{h} 36^{m} 19.7^{s}	+21° 05′ 53″	
5337	LEDA 71875	spiral galaxy	Pegasus	23^{h} 36^{m} 25.04^{s}	+21° 09′ 02.9″	15.4 (B)
5370	LEDA 5	lenticular galaxy	Andromeda	00^{h} 00^{m} 09.2^{s}	+32° 44′ 18″	14.9 (B)
5371	LEDA 24	lenticular galaxy	Andromeda	00^{h} 00^{m} 14.8^{s}	+32° 49′ 55″	15.1 (B)
5378	UGC 1	elliptical galaxy	Pegasus	00^{h} 02^{m} 37.8^{s}	16° 38′ 53″	14.9 (B)
5381	UGC 7	spiral galaxy	Pegasus	00^{h} 03^{m} 11.3^{s}	+15° 57′ 57″	14.9 (B)
5386	NGC 7832	elliptical galaxy	Pisces	00^{h} 06^{m} 28.4^{s}	−03° 42′ 58.1″	13.0 (B)

== See also ==
- Lists of astronomical objects
- List of NGC objects
- Collinder catalogue
- Lyon-Meudon Extragalactic Database
- Melotte catalogue
- New General Catalogue
- Uppsala General Catalogue

== Resources ==
- Dreyer, J. L. E. (1878), "A Supplement to Sir John Herschel's 'General Catalogue of Nebulae and Clusters of Stars'", Transactions of the Royal Irish Academy, 26: 381–426, Bibcode:1878TRIA...26..381D, JSTOR 30079091.
- Dreyer, J. L. E. (1910), "Second Index Catalogue of Nebulæ and Clusters of Stars, containing objects found in the years 1895 to 1907; with Notes and Corrections to the New General Catalogue and to the Index Catalogue for 1888-94", Memoirs of the Royal Astronomical Society, 59: 105, Bibcode:1910MmRAS..59..105D.
- Dreyer, J. L. E. (November 1912), "Corrections to the New General Catalogue", Monthly Notices of the Royal Astronomical Society, 73: 37–40, Bibcode:1912MNRAS..73...37D, doi:10.1093/mnras/73.1.37.
- Lindsay, E. M. (1965), "J. L. E. Dreyer and His New General Catalogue of Nebulae and Clusters of Stars", Astronomical Society of the Pacific Leaflets, 9 (436): 289, Bibcode:1965ASPL....9..289L.
- Seligman, Courtney, "Index Catalog (IC) I / II Objects", Celestial Atlas.
