= NGC 451 =

Spiral galaxy in the constellation Pisces

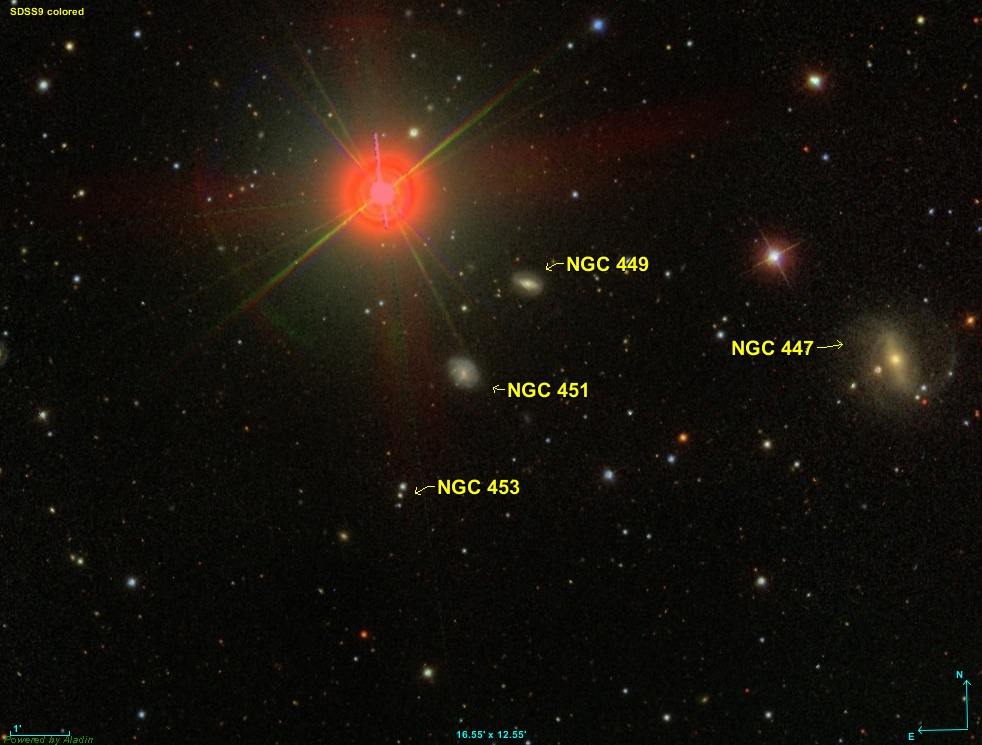
- NGC 451, along with NGC 447, 449, and 453 taken by SDSS.

Observation data (J2000 epoch)
- Constellation: Pisces
- Right ascension: 01^{h} 16^{m} 12.4^{s}
- Declination: +33° 03′ 51″
- Redshift: 0.016278
- Galactocentric velocity: 4880 km/s
- Apparent magnitude (V): 14.0

Characteristics
- Type: Sc

Other designations
- IC 1661, CGCG 502–19, KUG 0113+328B, MCG 5-4-11, Mrk 976, PGC 4594

NGC 451 is a spiral galaxy located in the constellation Pisces. It was discovered in 1881 by Édouard Stephan.

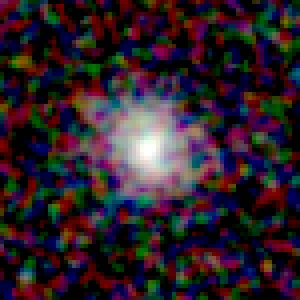
Photo taken by 2MASS
