= IC 2150 =

Galaxy in the constellation Triangulum

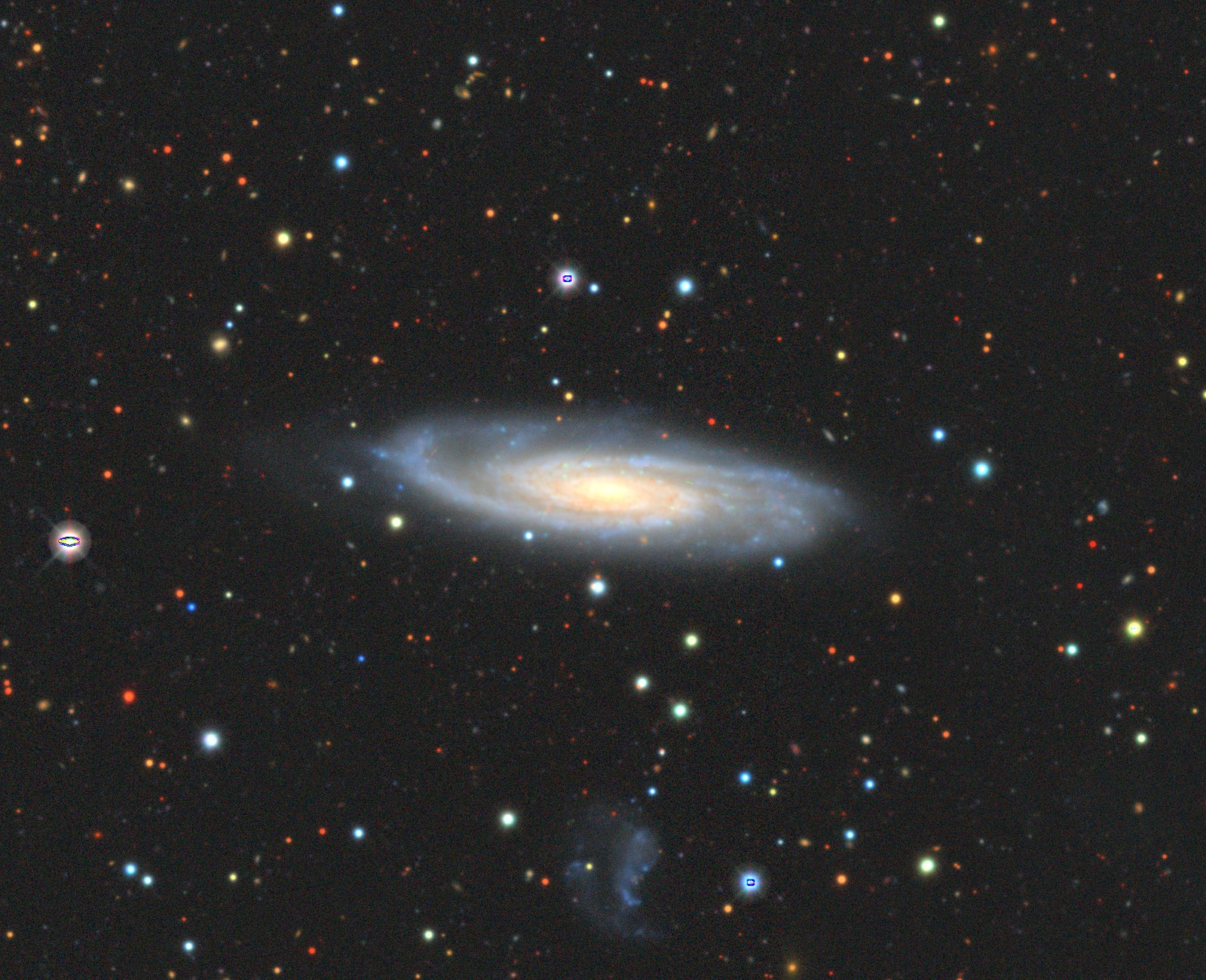
- IC 2150 imaged by Legacy Surveys

Observation data (J2000 epoch)
- Constellation: Columba
- Right ascension: 05^{h} 51^{m} 18.5787^{s}
- Declination: −38° 19′ 13.952″
- Redshift: 0.010404±0.0000170
- Heliocentric radial velocity: 3,119±5 km/s
- Distance: 140.12 ± 3.45 Mly (42.962 ± 1.057 Mpc)
- Apparent magnitude (V): 13.58

Characteristics
- Type: SB(r)c
- Size: ~142,700 ly (43.74 kpc) (estimated)
- Apparent size (V): 2.6′ × 0.8′

Other designations
- ESO 306- G 032, IRAS 05496-3819, 2MASX J05511855-3819136, MCG -06-13-016, PGC 18000

IC 2150 is a barred spiral galaxy in the constellation of Columba. Its velocity with respect to the cosmic microwave background is 3,196±7 km/s, which corresponds to a Hubble distance of 153.8 ± 10.8 Mly (47.14 ± 3.30 Mpc). However, 16 non-redshift measurements give a closer mean distance of 140.12 ± 3.45 Mly (42.962 ± 1.057 Mpc). It was discovered by American astronomer Lewis Swift on 31 January 1898.

IC 2150 has a possible active galactic nucleus, i.e. it has a compact region at the center of its galaxy that emits a significant amount of energy across the electromagnetic spectrum, with characteristics indicating that this luminosity is not produced by the stars.

== Supernovae ==
Three supernovae have been observed in IC 2150. The first two were discovered simultaneously.

- SN 2016bfu (Type Ia-91bg-like, mag. 16.4) was discovered by Stu Parker on 20 March 2016.
- SN 2016bfv (Type II, mag. 17.2) was discovered by Stu Parker on 20 March 2016.
- SN 2026uxx (Type Ic, mag. 16.931) was discovered by ATLAS on 15 July 2026.

== See also ==
- List of IC objects
