= IC 2486 =

Spiral galaxy in the constellation Leo

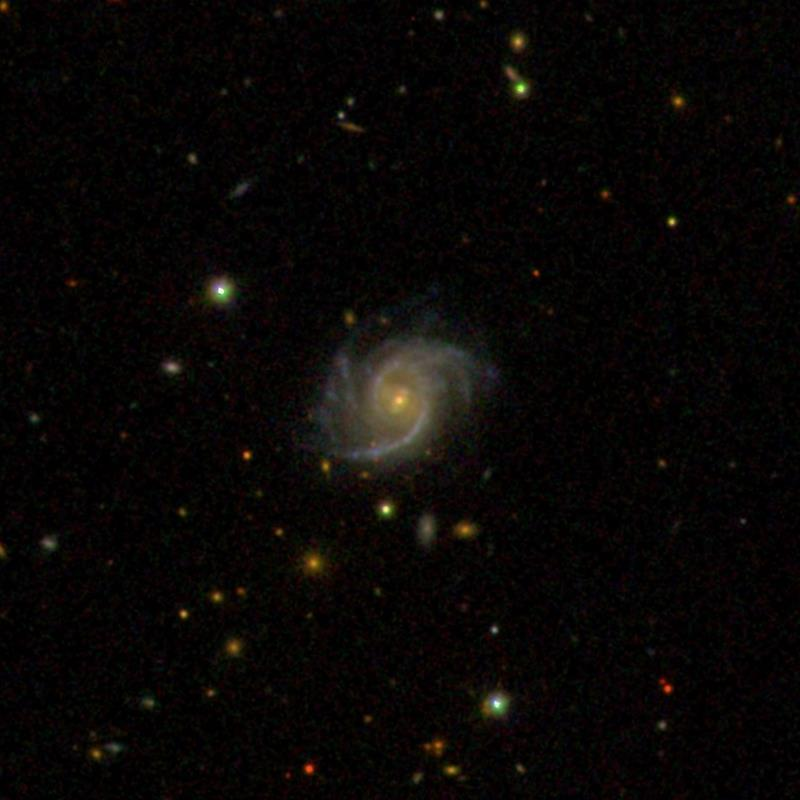
- IC 2486 imaged by the Sloan Digital Sky Survey.

Observation data (J2000 epoch)
- Constellation: Leo
- Right ascension: 09^{h} 30^{m} 16^{s}
- Declination: +26° 38’ 28”
- Redshift: 0.045828
- Heliocentric radial velocity: 13,739 km/s
- Distance: 638 Mly (195.61 Mpc)
- Apparent magnitude (V): 14.2
- Apparent magnitude (B): 15

Characteristics
- Type: Sbc Spiral galaxy
- Size: 160,000 ly
- Apparent size (V): 0.90' x 0.8'

Other designations
- UGC 5062, MCG +05-23-006, CGCG 152-020, PGC 26982, LEDA 26982

IC 2486 is a Sbc-type spiral galaxy that is located in the constellation of Leo. Other catalog identifiers include PGC 26982, UGC 5062, and LEDA 26982. It is located 638 million light years from Earth and has a diameter of about 160,000 thousand light-years. IC 2486 was discovered by Stéphane Javelle in May 1903.
