= IC 1185 =

Spiral galaxy located in Hercules

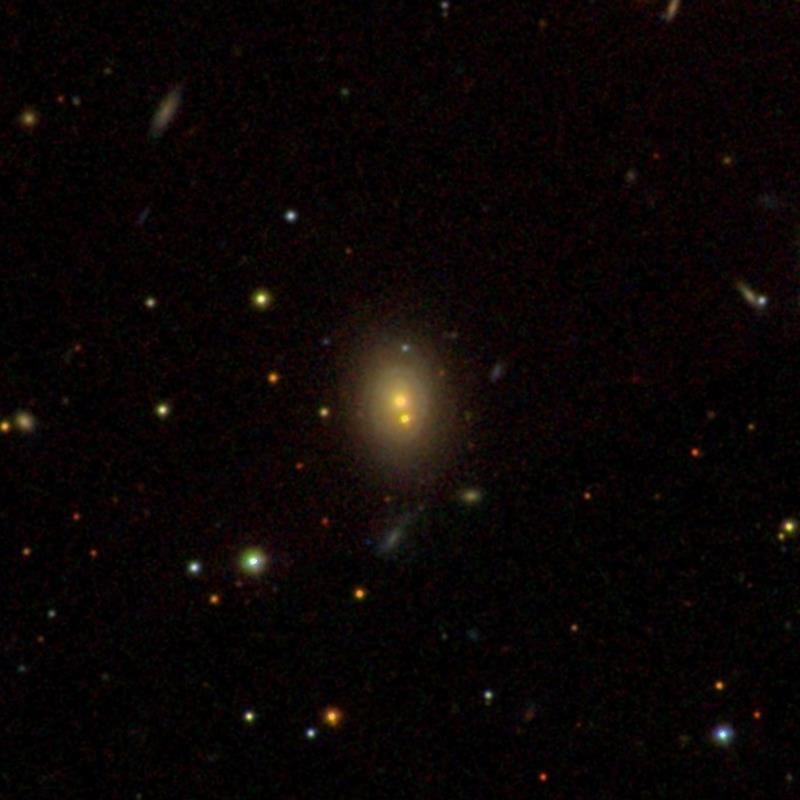
- IC 1185 captured by Sloan Digital Sky Survey

Observation data (J2000 epoch)
- Constellation: Hercules
- Right ascension: 16^{h} 05^{m} 44.6^{s}
- Declination: +17° 43′ 01.3″
- Redshift: 0.034764
- Heliocentric radial velocity: 10,440 km/s
- Distance: 424.5 Mly (130.2 Mpc)
- Group or cluster: Hercules Cluster
- Apparent magnitude (V): 14.89
- Surface brightness: 22.7 mag/arcsec

Characteristics
- Type: Sab
- Size: 115,000 ly

Other designations
- PGC 57096, 2MASX J16054464+1743008, GIN 500, WBL 607-022, CGCG 108-134, SDSS J160544.67+174301.4, 2XMM J160544.6+174301, NFP J160544.7+174302, MCG +03-41-110, 2MASS J16054468+1743014, BMW-HRI J160544.5+174303, LEDA 57096

IC 1185 is a type Sab spiral galaxy located in Hercules. It is located 420 million light-years from the Solar System and has an approximate diameter of 115,000 light-years. IC 1185 was discovered on June 8, 1888, by astronomer Guillaume Bigourdan and is a member of the Hercules Cluster. IC 1185 has a surface brightness of magnitude 22.7 and presents a double nucleus, which might represent a late stage of galaxy merger.
