= IC 3430 =

Dwarf elliptical in the constellation virgo

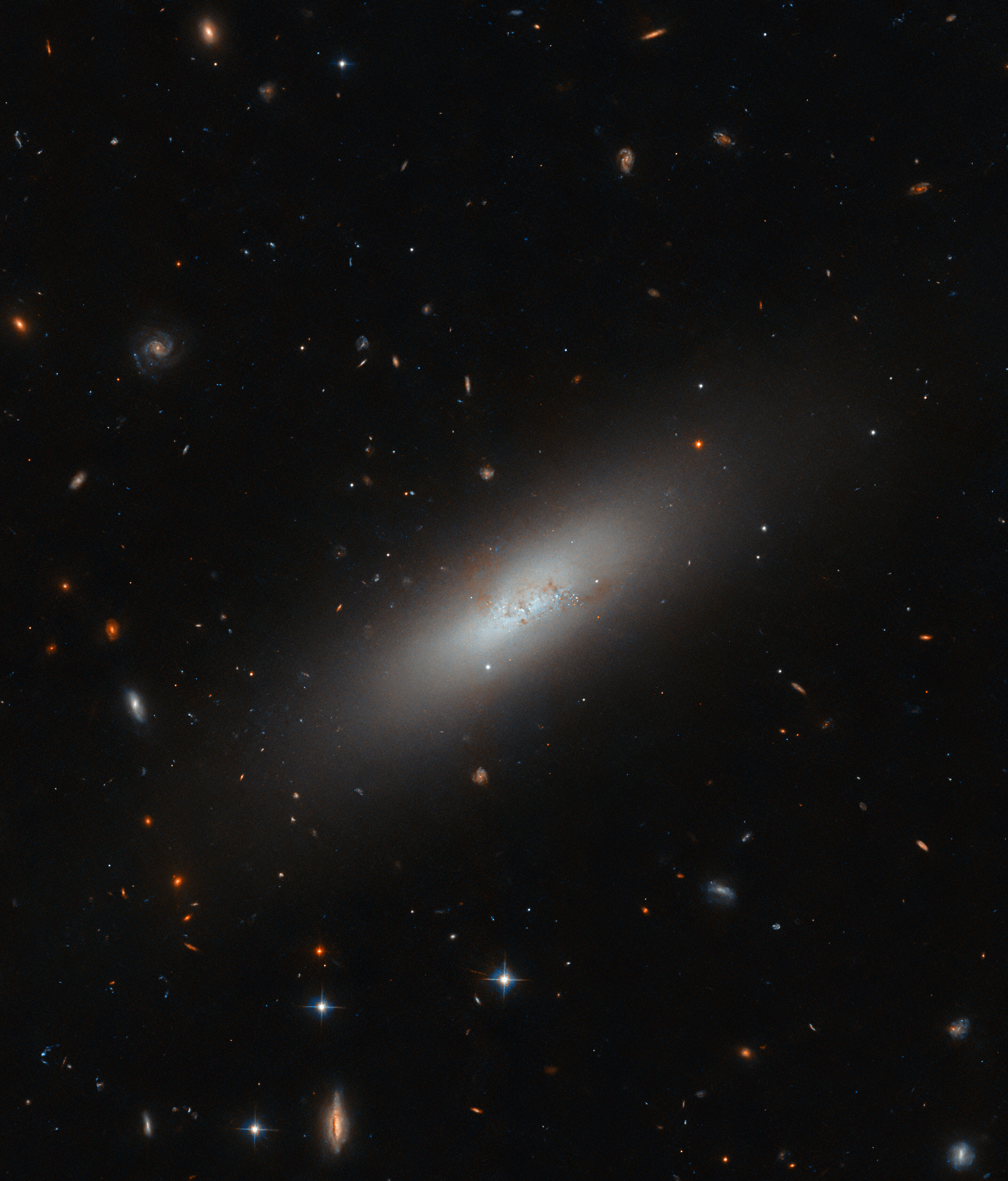
- Image of IC 3430 captured by the Hubble Space Telescope

Observation data
- Constellation: Virgo
- Right ascension: 12h 30m 17.00s
- Declination: +09 05 6.5
- Distance: 45 million ly
- Apparent magnitude (B): 15.4

IC 3430 is a dwarf elliptical galaxy located around 45 million light years away in the constellation of Virgo. It is a member of other Virgo Cluster.

Like many other elliptical galaxies, IC 3430 has a smooth, oval shape with a lack of any notable features. IC 3430 is also missing much of the gas needed for the formation of new stars. But the core of IC 3430 interestingly contains many hot and massive blue stars which is an uncommon sight for elliptical galaxies. This may be due to the pressure of IC 3430 ploughing through the Virgo Cluster igniting gas in the core to form these new stars.
