= NGC 7010 =

Galaxy in the constellation Aquarius

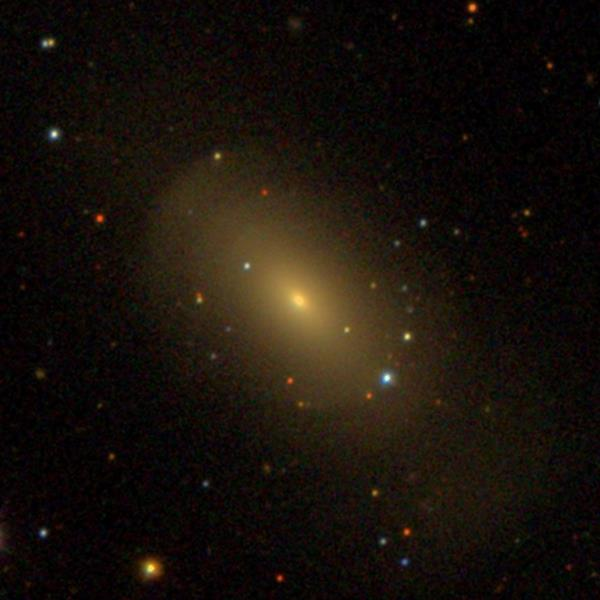
- SDSS image of NGC 7010.

Observation data (J2000 epoch)
- Constellation: Aquarius
- Right ascension: 21^{h} 04^{m} 39.5^{s}
- Declination: −12° 20′ 18″
- Redshift: 0.028306
- Heliocentric radial velocity: 8,486 km/s
- Distance: 370 Mly (112 Mpc)
- Apparent magnitude (V): 14.5

Characteristics
- Type: E+ pec
- Size: ~224,600 ly (68.86 kpc) (estimated)
- Apparent size (V): 1.9 x 1.0

Other designations
- NPM1G -12.0537, IC 5082, MCG -2-53-24, PGC 66039

NGC 7010 is a massive elliptical galaxy located about 370 million light-years from Earth in the constellation Aquarius. NGC 7010 was discovered by astronomer John Herschel on August 6, 1823, and was later listed by French astronomer Guillaume Bigourdan as IC 5082. It is host to a supermassive black hole with an estimated mass of 4.7 × 10^{8} M_{☉}.

== Physical characteristics ==
NGC 7010 has broad, plateau shaped shells of stars surrounding it which are quite low in surface brightness. These shells are unusually red or redder than the rest of NGC 7010. It is thought that mergers with other galaxies along with phase wrapping causes the lower mass stars in NGC 7010 to be separated from higher mass blue stars in the shells leaving only the higher mass stars in the shells. As these stars evolve and move into the Asymptotic giant branch (AGB) stage, these shells would become very red in color, especially if further star formation is suppressed in the galaxy. It's theorized that the shells formed from the accretion of another galaxy.

== See also ==
- Elliptical galaxy
- NGC 3923-proto type Shell galaxy
- List of NGC objects (7001–7840)
