= IC 4481 =

Galaxy in the Boötes constellation

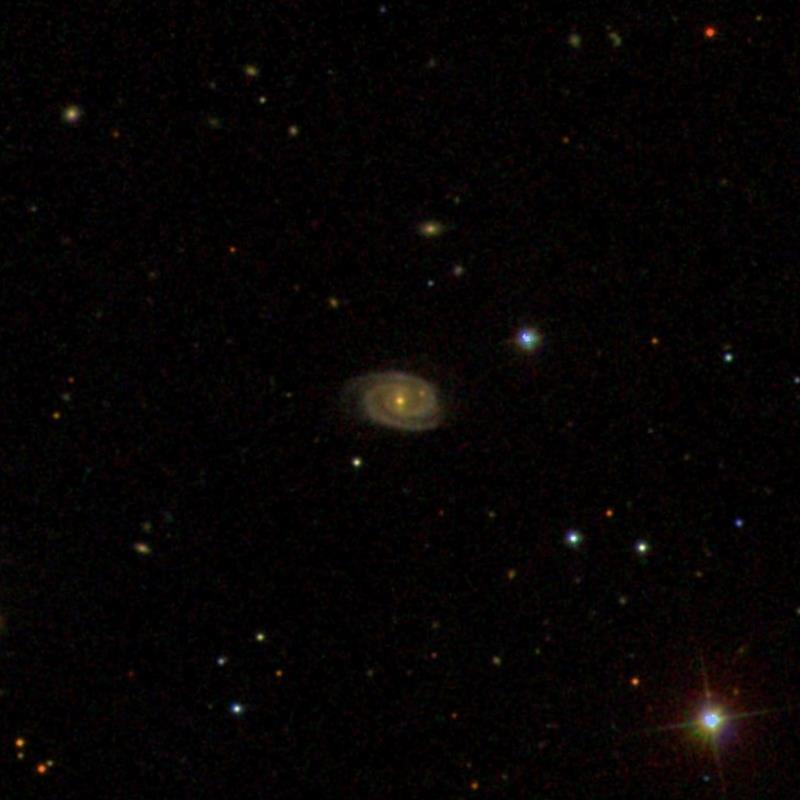
- IC 4481 captured by SDSS

Observation data (J2000 epoch)
- Constellation: Boötes
- Right ascension: 14^{h} 40^{m} 10.11^{s}
- Declination: +16° 08′ 29.22″
- Redshift: 0.110727
- Heliocentric radial velocity: 33,195 km/s
- Distance: 1.497 Gly (459 Mpc)
- Apparent magnitude (V): 15.7
- Apparent magnitude (B): 16.5
- Surface brightness: 12.5

Characteristics
- Type: S, SBbc
- Apparent size (V): 0.30′ × 0.2′

Other designations
- PGC 1501729, [TTL2012] 415654, ASK 678063.0

IC 4481 is a type SBbc barred spiral galaxy located in Boötes. Its redshift is 0.110727, meaning IC 4481 is located 1.49 billion light-years away from Earth. It is one of the furthest objects in the Index Catalogue and has an apparent dimension of 0.30 x 0.2 arcmin. IC 4481 was discovered on May 10, 1904, by Royal Harwood Frost, who found it "faint, very small, round and diffuse".

== See also ==
- List of the most distant astronomical objects
