= IC 1327 =

Galaxy in the constellation Aquila

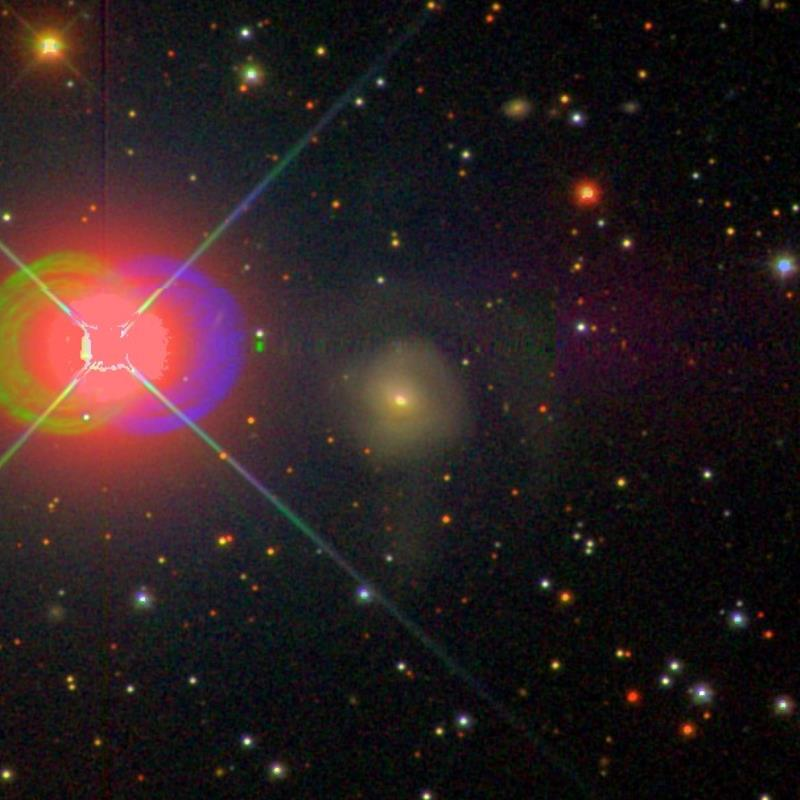
- Image of IC 1327 captured through SDSS

Observation data (J2000 epoch)
- Constellation: Aquila
- Right ascension: 20h 35m 41.27s
- Declination: -00d 00m 20.8s
- Redshift: 0.032386
- Heliocentric radial velocity: 9,709 km/s
- Distance: 445 Mly (136.4 Mpc)
- Apparent magnitude (V): 14.0
- Apparent magnitude (B): 14.9
- Surface brightness: 13.5

Characteristics
- Type: S0^+?, AGN?, S0-a
- Apparent size (V): 0.90' x 0.8'

Other designations
- PGC 65027, KIG 0881, CGCG 373-038, IRAS 20331-0010, NVSS J203541-000020

IC 1327 is lenticular galaxy of type S0-a, located in the constellation Aquila. Its redshift is 0.032386, which corresponds IC 1327 to be located 445 million light-years from Earth. It has an apparent dimension of 0.90 x 0.8 arcmin, meaning the galaxy is 117,000 light-years across. IC 1327 was discovered on August 10, 1890, by Sherburne Wesley Burnham.

According to a study conducted in April 2006, IC 1327 is considered an isolated galaxy, which is included in early-type E-S0 galaxies that make up 14% of the isolated sample of galaxies in the local universe. Moreover, IC 1327 contains X-ray emission within a distance of 100 arcsec from the infrared position, which its structure is inspected in overlays on optical images.
