= NGC 804 =

Lenticular galaxy in the constellation Triangulum

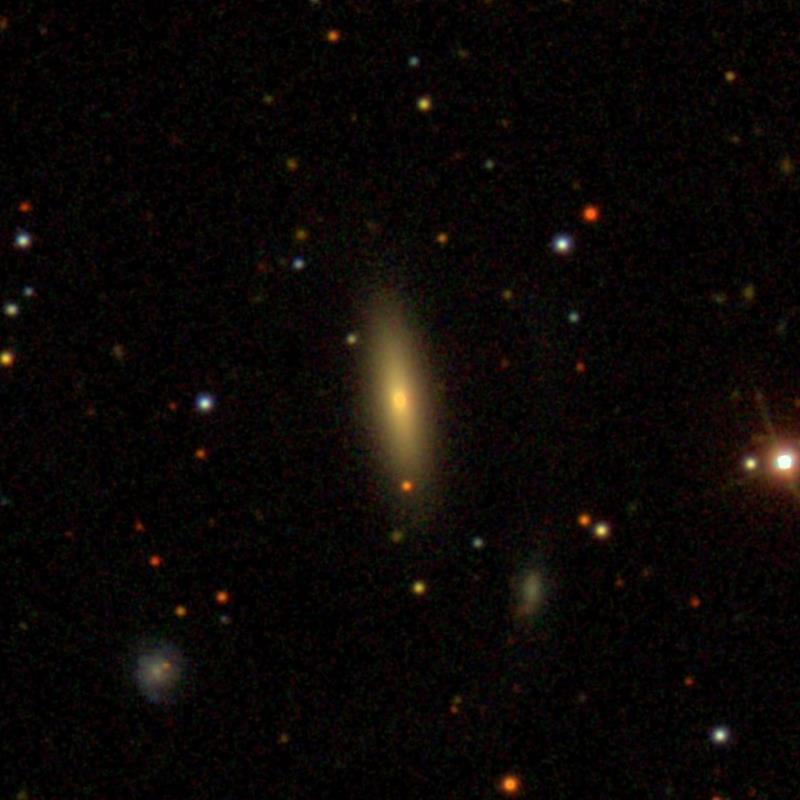
- SDSS image of NGC 804

Observation data (J2000 epoch)
- Constellation: Triangulum
- Right ascension: 02^{h} 04^{m} 02.106^{s}
- Declination: +30° 49′ 58.13″
- Redshift: 0.017639
- Heliocentric radial velocity: 5241 km/s
- Distance: 231.3 Mly (70.92 Mpc)
- Apparent magnitude (B): 14.7

Characteristics
- Type: S0

Other designations
- IC 1773, UGC 1557, MCG +05-05-049, PGC 7873

NGC 804 is a lenticular galaxy located in the constellation Triangulum about 231 million light-years from the Milky Way. It was discovered by the American astronomer Lewis Swift in 1885. This galaxy was also observed by the French astronomer Guillaume Bigourdan on December 24, 1897, and it has been added to the Index Catalogue under the symbol IC 1773.

== See also ==
- List of NGC objects (1–1000)
