= IC 535 =

Galaxy in the constellation Hydra

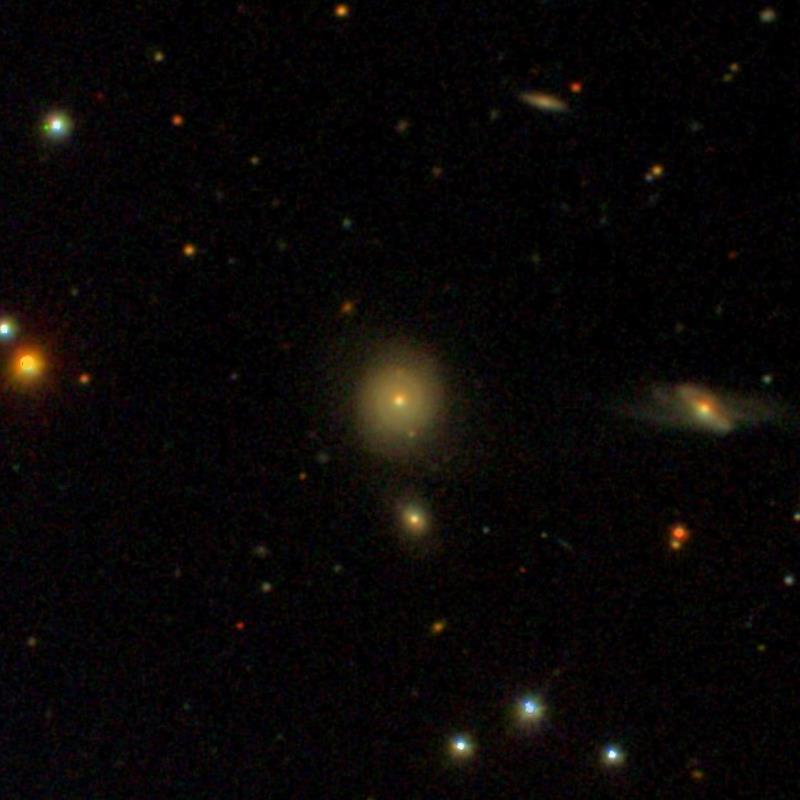
- Sloan Digital Sky Survey of IC 535

Observation data (J2000 epoch)
- Constellation: Hydra
- Right ascension: 09h 22m 16.22s
- Declination: -01d 02m 25.25s
- Redshift: 0.055358
- Heliocentric radial velocity: 16,049 km/s
- Distance: 745 Mly (228.4 Mpc)
- Apparent magnitude (V): 18.045
- Surface brightness: 23.7 mag/arcsec

Characteristics
- Type: E
- Size: 85,000 ly

Other designations
- PGC 26524, CGCG 006-034, 2MASX J09221622-0102248, SDSS J092216.22-010225.2, 6dF J0922162-010225, 2MASS J09221621-0102251, PGC 1128295, NPM1G -00.0239

IC 535 known as PGC 26524 and PGC 1128295, is a type E elliptical galaxy with a ring located in the constellation Hydra. It is located 740 million light-years away from the Solar System and has an estimated diameter of 85,000 light-years. IC 535 was discovered on March 23, 1893, by Stephane Javelle. It has a surface brightness of 23.7 mag/arcsec and is moving at radial velocity of 16,049 kilometers per seconds. It is located at right ascension (9 hours: 22.2 minutes) and declination (-01 degrees: 03 minutes).
