= NGC 449 =

Spiral galaxy in the constellation Pisces

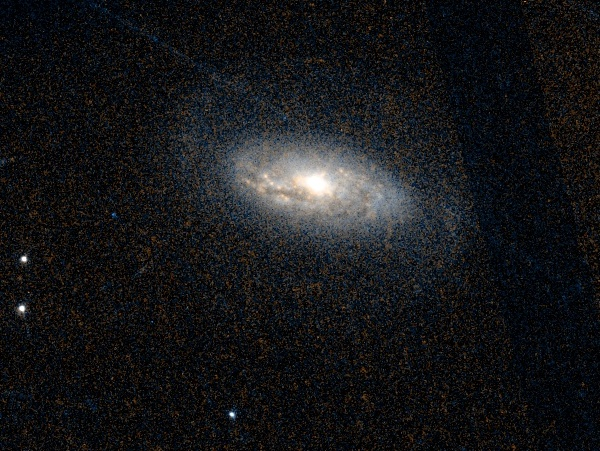
- NGC 449 as seen by the Hubble Space Telescope

Observation data (J2000 epoch)
- Constellation: Pisces
- Right ascension: 01^{h} 16^{m} 07.2^{s}
- Declination: +33° 05′ 22″
- Redshift: 0.015946
- Heliocentric radial velocity: 4,780 km/s
- Apparent magnitude (V): 15.01
- Absolute magnitude (V): −20.37

Characteristics
- Type: (R')S?
- Apparent size (V): 0.8' × 0.5'

Other designations
- MRK 0001, CGCG 502-018, MCG +05-04-009, 2MASX J01160722+3305218, 2MASXi J0116072+330521, IRAS 01133+3249, PGC 4587.

NGC 449 is a spiral galaxy of type (R')S? located in the constellation Pisces. It was discovered on November 11, 1881 by Édouard Stephan. It was described by Dreyer as "very faint, very small, round, very little brighter middle, very faint star involved."

NGC 449 is an active galaxy, specifically a Seyfert galaxy. The supermassive black hole at the center of NGC 449 is 1.32×10^{7} M_{☉}, and matter from its accretion disk is currently accreting at a rate of 2.54×10^{−2} M_{☉} per year.

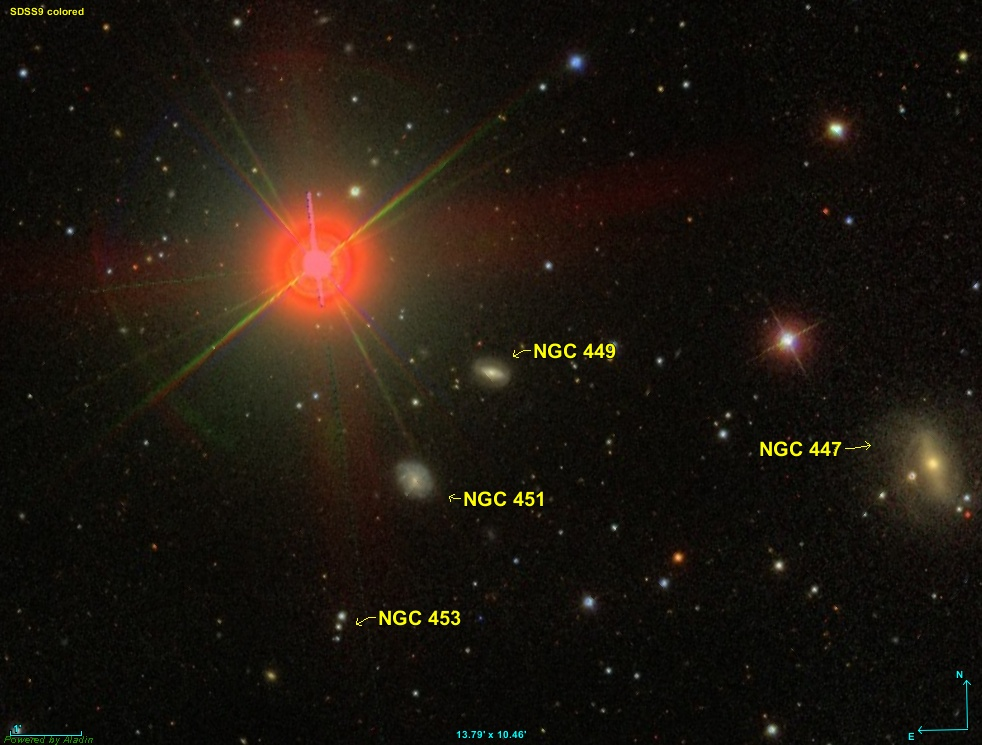
NGC 447, NGC 449, NGC 451, and NGC 453 (SDSS)
