= IC 4539 =

Galaxy located in Corona Borealis

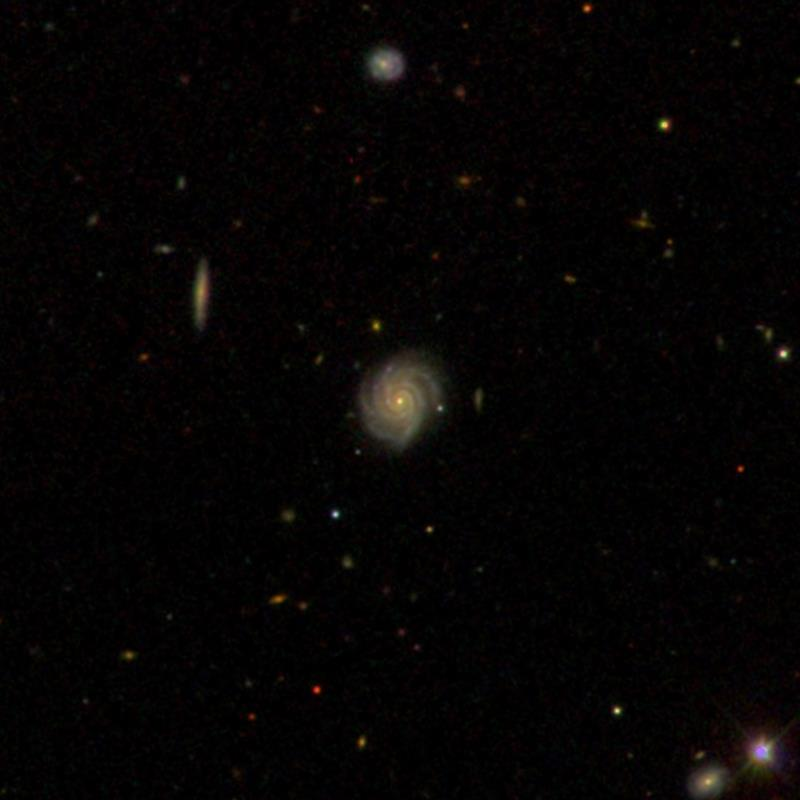
- Sloan Digital Sky Survey image of IC 4539

Observation data (J2000 epoch)
- Constellation: Corona Borealis
- Right ascension: 15h 18m 31.15s
- Declination: +32d 23m 34.27s
- Redshift: 0.061307
- Heliocentric radial velocity: 18,365 km/s
- Distance: 845 Mly (259.1 Mpc)
- Apparent magnitude (V): 16.3
- Apparent magnitude (B): 15.5
- Surface brightness: 13.4

Characteristics
- Type: SB?, SABb
- Apparent size (V): 0.40' x 0.4'

Other designations
- MCG +06-34-003, PGC 54642, SIT 0129-1, IRAS F15165+3234

IC 4539 is a type SABb intermediate spiral galaxy located in Corona Borealis. Its redshift is 0.061307, which corresponds IC 4539 to be 845 million light-years from Earth. It has an apparent dimension of 0.40 by 0.4 arcmin, meaning the galaxy is about 95,000 light-years across. IC 4539 was discovered by Stephane Javelle on June 23, 1903, who found it "as faint, small, round with a very brighter middle."
