= NGC 223 =

Spiral galaxy in the constellation Cetus

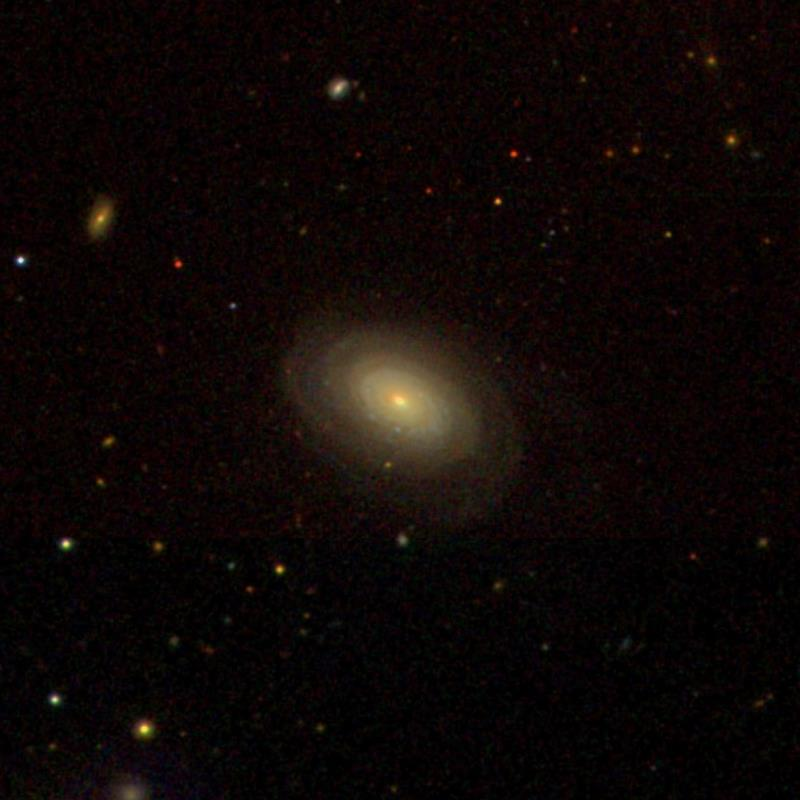
- SDSS image of NGC 223

Observation data (J2000 epoch)
- Constellation: Cetus
- Right ascension: 00^{h} 42^{m} 15.9^{s}
- Declination: +00° 50′ 44″
- Redshift: 0.017772
- Distance: 238 Mly
- Apparent magnitude (V): 14.0g

Characteristics
- Type: SB0
- Apparent size (V): 0.42' × 0.29'

Other designations
- IC 44, UGC 00450, CGCG 383-074, MCG +00-02-129, 2MASX J00421585+0050432, IRAS F00397+0034, PGC 2527.

NGC 223 is a spiral galaxy located approximately 238 million light-years from Earth. It is located in the constellation Cetus. It was discovered on January 5, 1853, by George Bond.

== See also ==
- List of NGC objects (1–1000)
