= NGC 823 =

Galaxy in the constellation Fornax

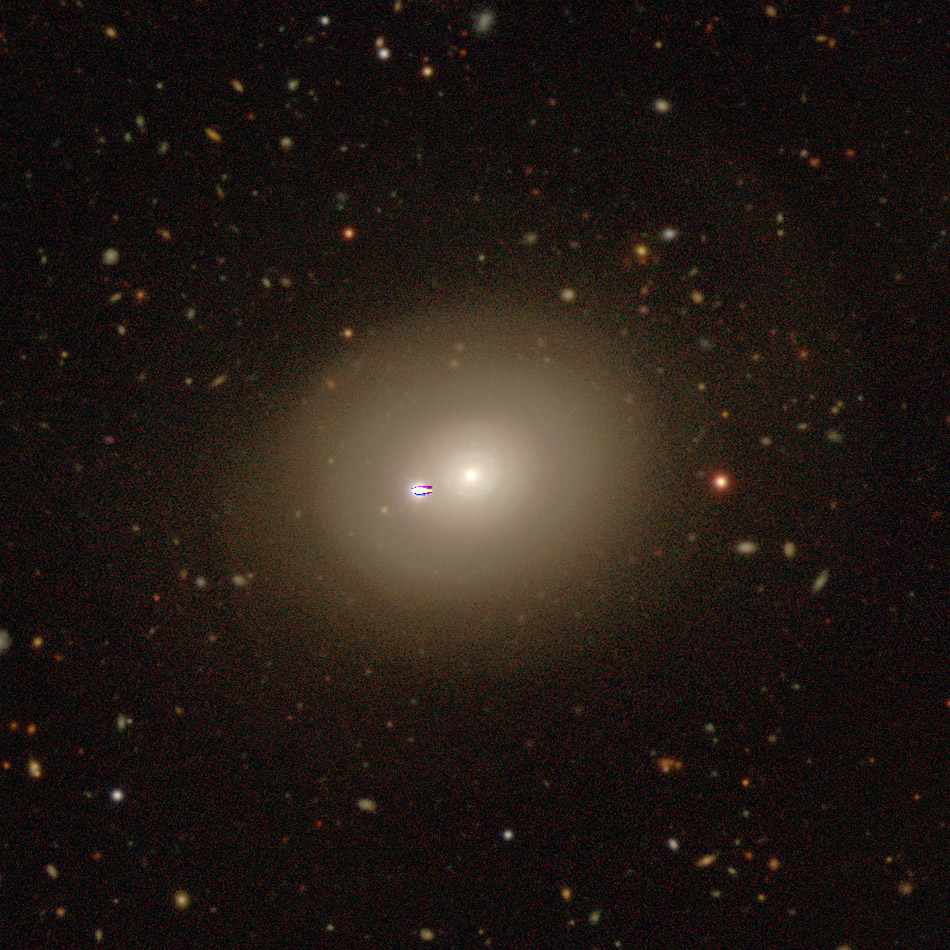
- legacy surveys image of NGC 823

Observation data (J2000 epoch)
- Constellation: Fornax
- Right ascension: 02^{h} 07^{m} 20.07002^{s}
- Declination: −25° 26′ 30.9656″
- Redshift: 0.014754
- Heliocentric radial velocity: 4391 km/s
- Distance: 194.2 Mly (59.54 Mpc)
- Apparent magnitude (B): 13.61

Characteristics
- Type: SA0^{−}(r):
- Apparent size (V): 1.7′ × 1.2′

Other designations
- IC 1782, MCG -04-06-005, PGC 8093

NGC 823, also known as IC 1782, is an unbarred lenticular galaxy in the constellation Fornax. It is estimated to be 194 million light-years from the Milky Way and has a diameter of approximately 100,000 light years. NGC 823 was discovered on October 14, 1830, by astronomer John Herschel.

SN 2022abid (ZTF22abyelas) a Type Ia supernova from an exploding white dwarf was discovered on 23 November 2022.

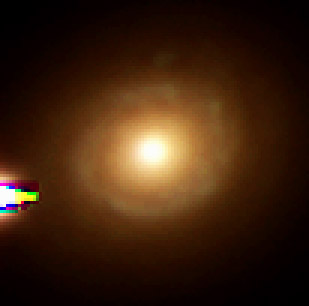
Central region of NGC 823 with legacy surveys

== See also ==
- List of NGC objects (1–1000)
