= NGC 719 =

Galaxy in the constellation of Aries

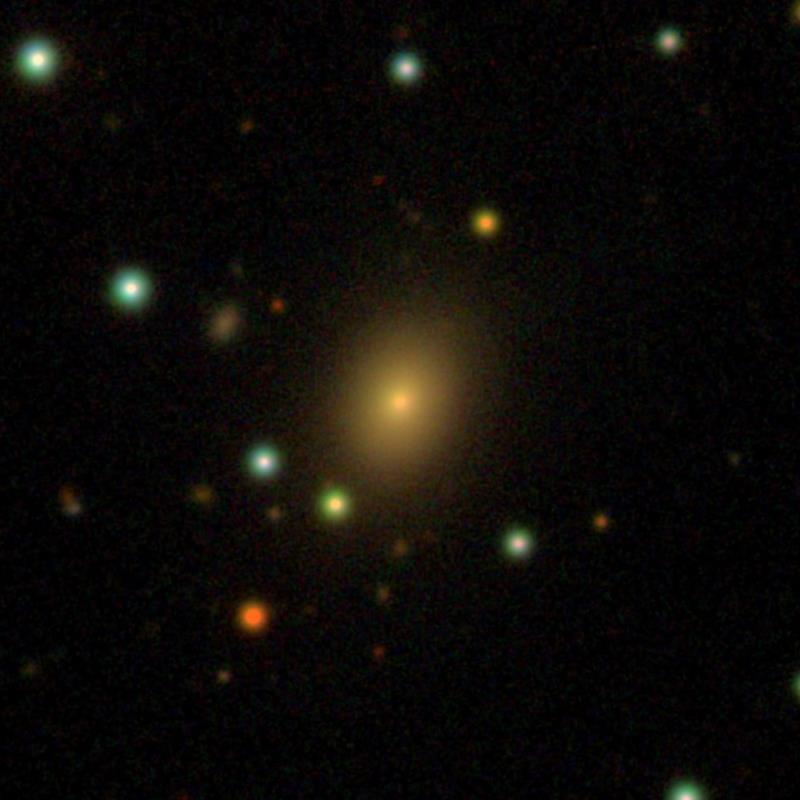
- SDSS image of NGC 719

Observation data (J2000 epoch)
- Constellation: Aries
- Right ascension: 01^{h} 53^{m} 38.86021^{s}
- Declination: +19° 50′ 25.7090″
- Redshift: 0.030528
- Heliocentric radial velocity: 9012 km/s
- Distance: 400.4 Mly (122.75 Mpc)
- Apparent magnitude (B): 14.83

Characteristics
- Type: S0

Other designations
- IC 1744, UGC 1360, PGC 7019

NGC 719 is a lenticular galaxy in the constellation Aries. It was first discovered, on 24 November 1861, by Heinrich d'Arrest.

== Gallery ==
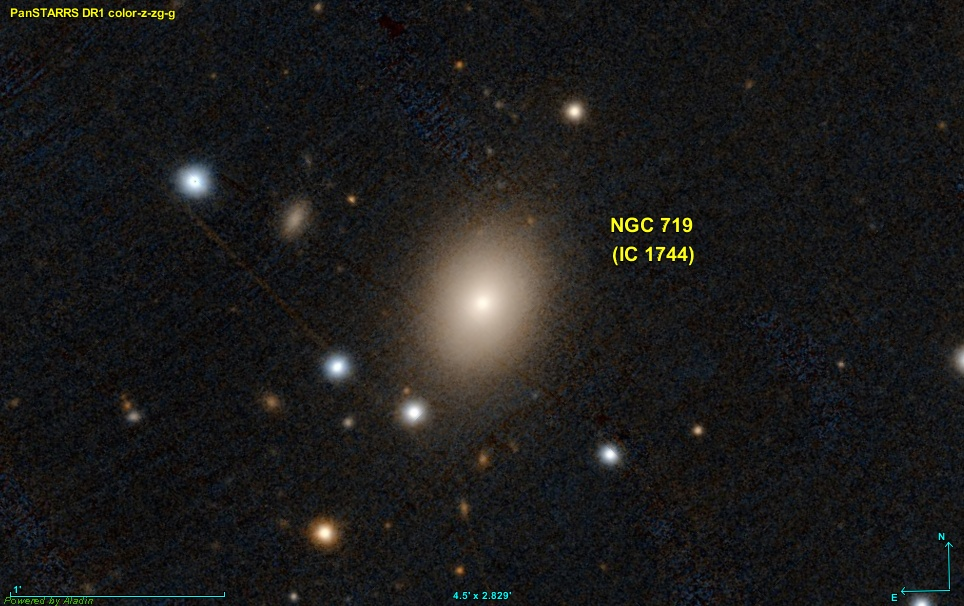
Pan-STARRS image of NGC 719

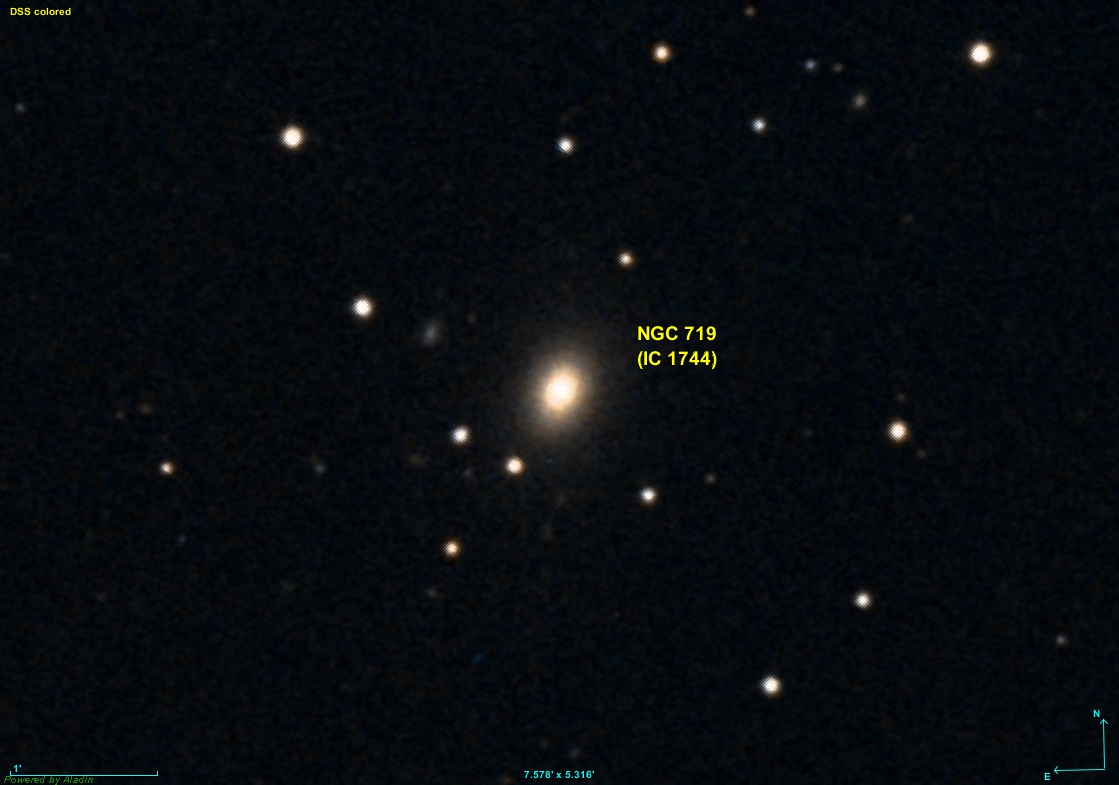
DSS image of NGC 719
