= IC 1189 =

Lenticular galaxy

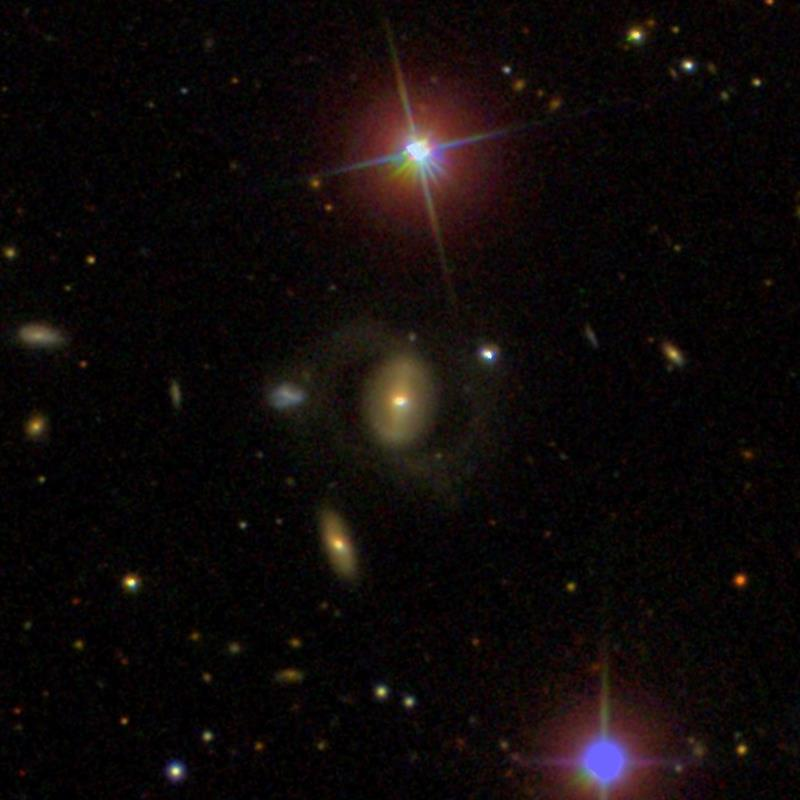
- SDSS image of IC 1189

Observation data (J2000 epoch)
- Constellation: Hercules
- Right ascension: 16^{h} 06^{m} 14.8^{s}
- Declination: +18° 10′ 58.3″
- Redshift: 0.039400
- Heliocentric radial velocity: 11,812 km/s
- Distance: 557 Mly (171 Mpc)
- Group or cluster: Hercules Cluster
- Apparent magnitude (V): 15.5

Characteristics
- Type: (R)SB(rs)0/a, Sbrst
- Size: 145,000 ly
- Notable features: Starburst galaxy

Other designations
- PGC 57135, KUG 1604+143, Mrk 300, CGCG 108-144, MCG +03-41-119, 2MASX J16061486+1810582, IRAS F16039+1819, WBL 607-030, ASK 564476.0, NSA 099884, ABELL 2151:[D80] 126, SDSS J160614.83+181058.3, LEDA 57135

IC 1189 is a S0-a lenticular galaxy with a ring structure located in Hercules. It is located 557 million light-years away from the Solar System and has an approximate diameter of 145,000 light-years. IC 1189 was discovered on June 7, 1888, by Lewis Swift. It is a member of the Hercules Cluster.

IC 1189 has an active galactic nucleus and is classified as a starburst galaxy meaning to say, it is a powerhouse star factory making stars at a rate hundred of times greater compared to the Milky Way. Additionally, it falls into the Markarian galaxies category as Mrk 300, in which its core shines in ultraviolet rays.
