= NGC 4497 =

Lenticular galaxy in the constellation of Virgo

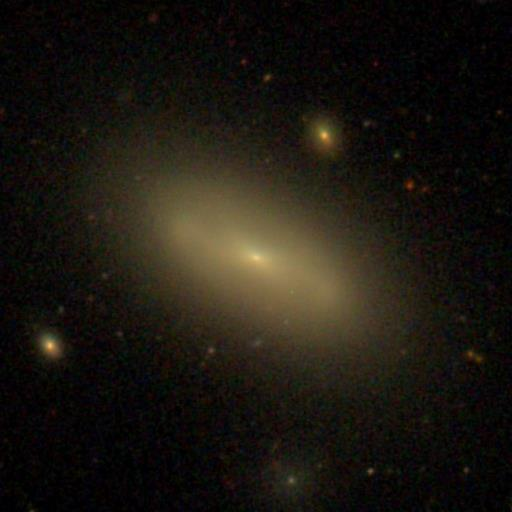
- SDSS image of NGC 4497.

Observation data (J2000 epoch)
- Constellation: Virgo
- Right ascension: 12^{h} 31^{m} 32.5^{s}
- Declination: 11° 37′ 29″
- Redshift: 0.003486/1045 km/s
- Distance: 61,288,000 ly
- Group or cluster: Virgo Cluster
- Apparent magnitude (V): 13.3

Characteristics
- Type: SAB0^+(s)
- Size: ~29,274.8 ly (estimated)
- Apparent size (V): 1.99 x 0.96

Other designations
- IC 3452, PGC 41457, UGC 7665, VCC 1368

NGC 4497 is a lenticular galaxy located about 60 million light-years away in the constellation Virgo. NGC 4497 was discovered by astronomer William Herschel on March 15, 1784. It was rediscovered by astronomer Arnold Schwassmann on November 8, 1900 and was listed as IC 3452. NGC 4497 is a member of the Virgo Cluster.

== See also ==
- List of NGC objects (4001–5000)
- Lenticular galaxy
