= IC 923 =

Galaxy located in Ursa Major

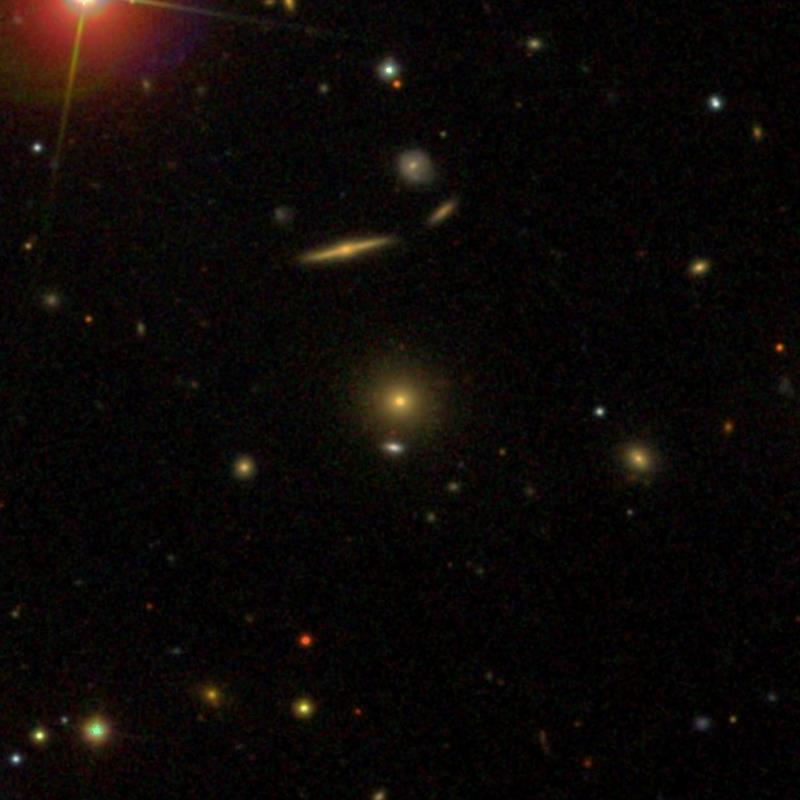
- SDSS image of IC 923 (located above the image)

Observation data (J2000 epoch)
- Constellation: Ursa Major
- Right ascension: 13h 43m 16.103s
- Declination: +55d 36m 56.85s
- Redshift: 0.069243
- Heliocentric radial velocity: 20,765 km/s
- Distance: 954 Mly (292.5 Mpc)
- Apparent magnitude (V): 15.0
- Apparent magnitude (B): 16.0
- Surface brightness: 12.4

Characteristics
- Type: S0
- Apparent size (V): 0.50' x 0.2'

Other designations
- [TTL2012] 081743, SDSS J134316.09+553656.8, EON J205.817+55.616

IC 923 is a lenticular galaxy located in Ursa Major. Its redshift is 0.069243 which means the galaxy is 954 million light-years from Earth. IC 923 has apparent dimensions of 0.50 x 0.2 arcmin, meaning it is approximately 139,000 light-years across. IC 923 was discovered in June 1892, by Edward Emerson Barnard and is a member of galaxy group V1CG 588.
