= IC 4214 =

Spiral galaxy in the constellation Centaurus

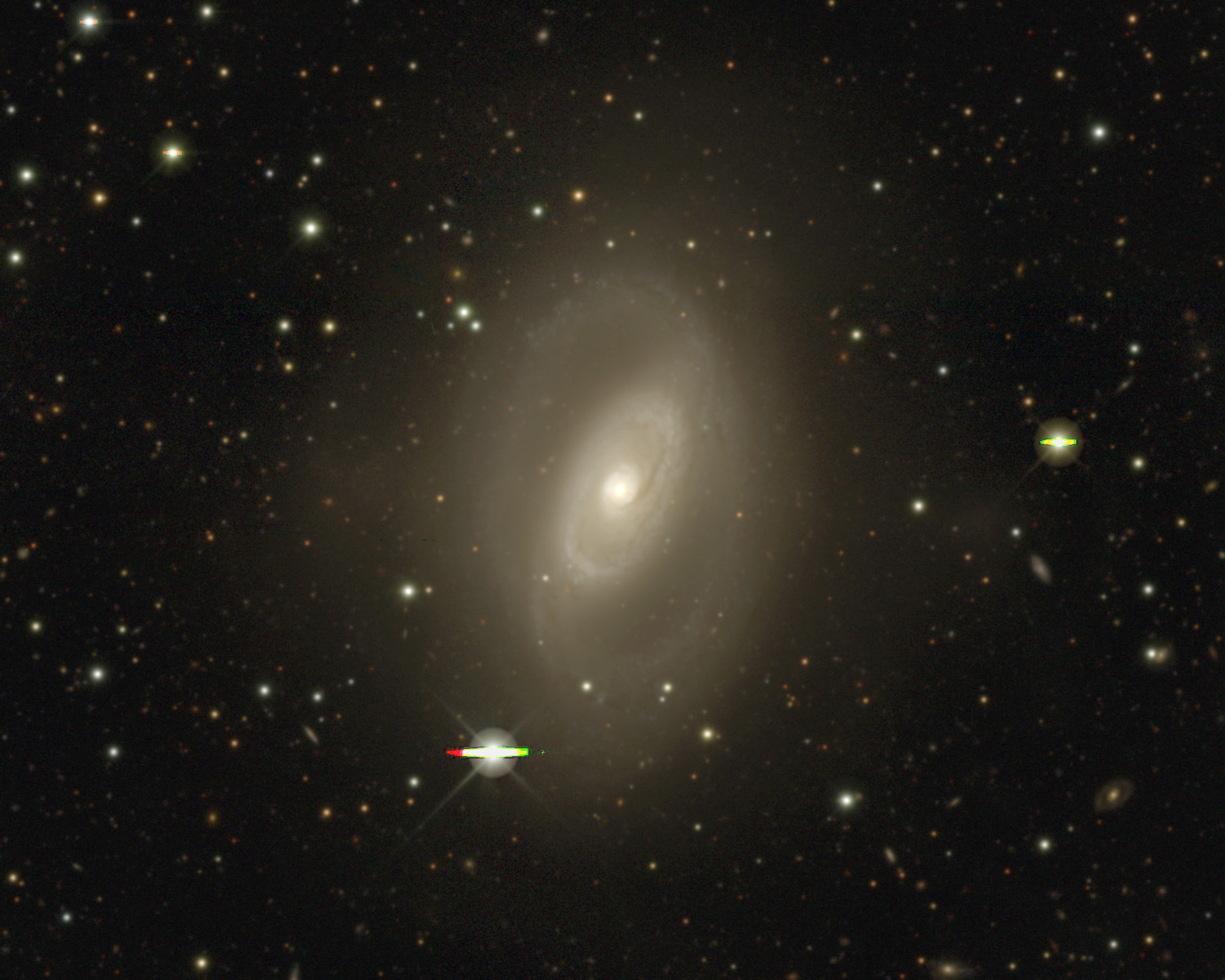
- IC 4214 imaged by Legacy Surveys

Observation data (J2000.0 epoch)
- Constellation: Centaurus
- Right ascension: 13^{h} 17^{m} 43^{s}
- Declination: −32° 06′ 05″
- Redshift: 0.007705
- Heliocentric radial velocity: 2310 ± 2
- Distance: 106 million LY
- Apparent magnitude (V): 11.65

Characteristics
- Type: SBab
- Apparent size (V): 2.80 x 1.8

Other designations
- PGC 46304

IC 4214 is a barred spiral galaxy in the constellation Centaurus. It's classified as a type SBaB galaxy. It was first discovered in 1897 by astronomer Lewis Swift. The galaxy is approximately 100 thousand light-years across.

IC 4214 is a three-ringed structure, with its nuclear, inner, and outer rings. A weak bar feature is present.
