= IC 1192 =

Galaxy in the constellation Hercules

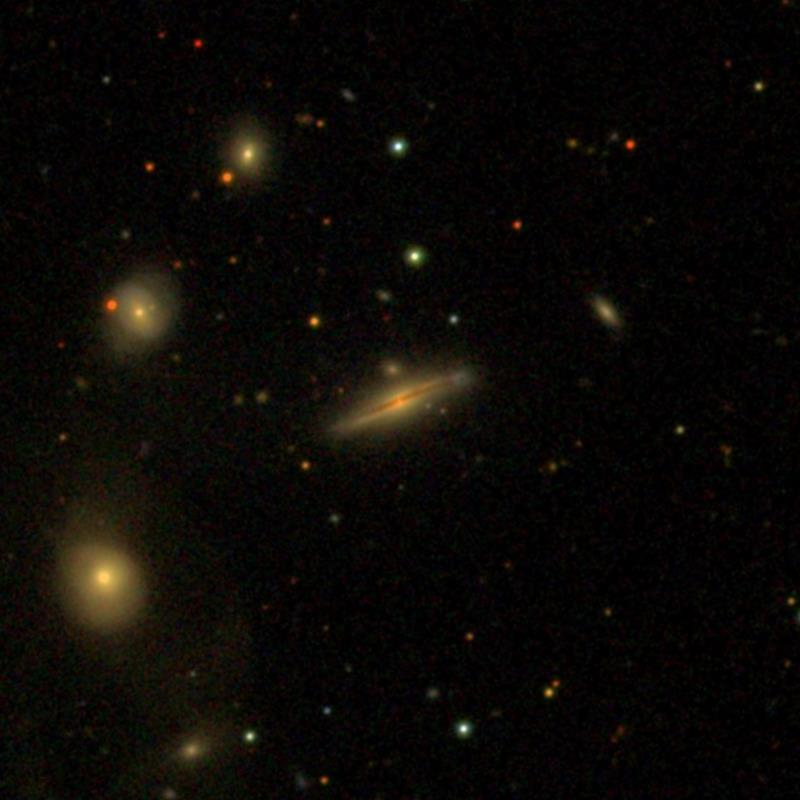
- Sloan Digital Sky Survey image of IC 1192

Observation data (J2000 epoch)
- Constellation: Hercules
- Right ascension: 16^{h} 06^{m} 33.1^{s}
- Declination: +17° 46′ 32.3″
- Redshift: 0.037936
- Heliocentric radial velocity: 11,373 km/s
- Distance: 543 Mly (166.4 Mpc)
- Group or cluster: Hercules Cluster
- Apparent magnitude (V): 15.5

Characteristics
- Type: Sb, SBb, AGN
- Size: 90,000 ly

Other designations
- PGC 57157, SDSS J160633.12+174632.4, AGC 260226, USGC U741 NED06, ABELL 2151:[D80] 074, LEDA 57157

IC 1192 is an edge-on barred spiral galaxy located in Hercules. It is located 543 million light-years from the Solar System and has a diameter of approximately 90,000 light-years. IC 1192 was discovered by Stephane Javelle on August 13, 1892. It is a member of the Hercules Cluster.

The luminosity class of IC 1192 is II and it has an active galaxy nucleus. It is specifically described as a LINER galaxy according to SIMBAD, meaning its nucleus presents an emission spectrum characterized by broad lines of weak ionized atoms.
