= IC 4537 =

Galaxy in the constellation Serpens

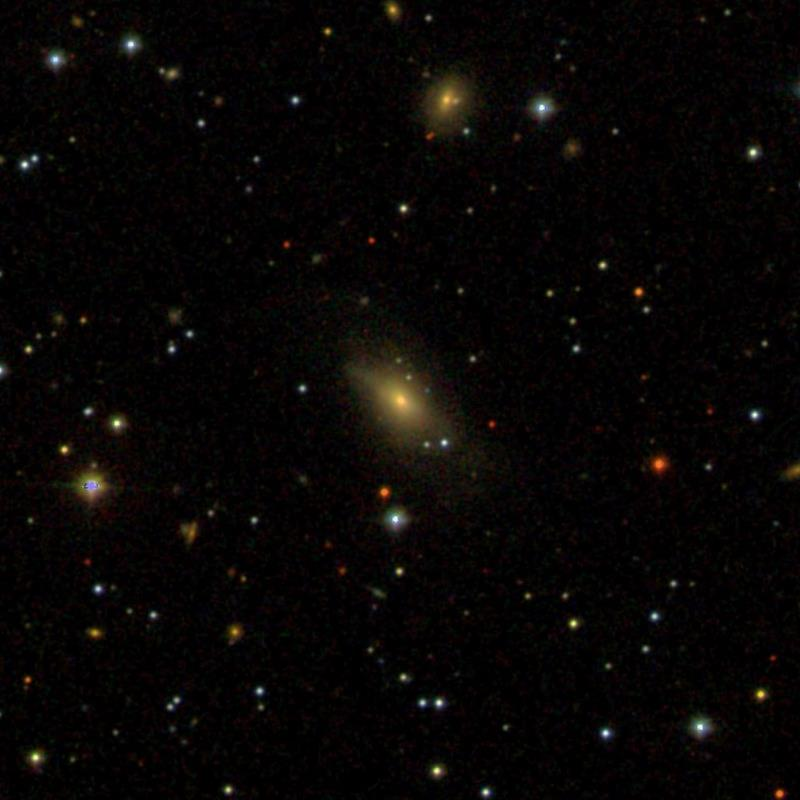
- IC 4537 taken by SDSS

Observation data (J2000 epoch)
- Constellation: Serpens
- Right ascension: 15^{h} 17^{m} 32.4^{s}
- Declination: +02° 02′ 50.6″
- Redshift: 0.054244
- Heliocentric radial velocity: 16,262 km/s
- Distance: 736 Mly (225.6 Mpc)
- Apparent magnitude (V): 0.11
- Apparent magnitude (B): 0.15
- Surface brightness: 23.9 mag/arcsec

Characteristics
- Type: E3, LINER
- Apparent size (V): 0.7' x 0.4'

Other designations
- PGC 54583, CGCG 021-070, 2MASX J15173246+0202504, SDSS J151732.44+020250.6, NSA 125157, ASK 695467.0, LEDA 54583

IC 4537 is a type S0-a lenticular galaxy located in the constellation Serpens. It is located 736 million light-years from the Solar System and was discovered by astronomer Edward Emerson Barnard although the year of discovery was unknown. IC 4537 has a surface brightness of magnitude 23.9 and a right ascension of (15 hours: 17.5 minutes) and declination (+0.2 degrees : 02 minutes). IC 4537 is located approximately 15 arc minutes away from the globular cluster Messier 5.
