= NGC 2494 =

Galaxy in the constellation Monoceros

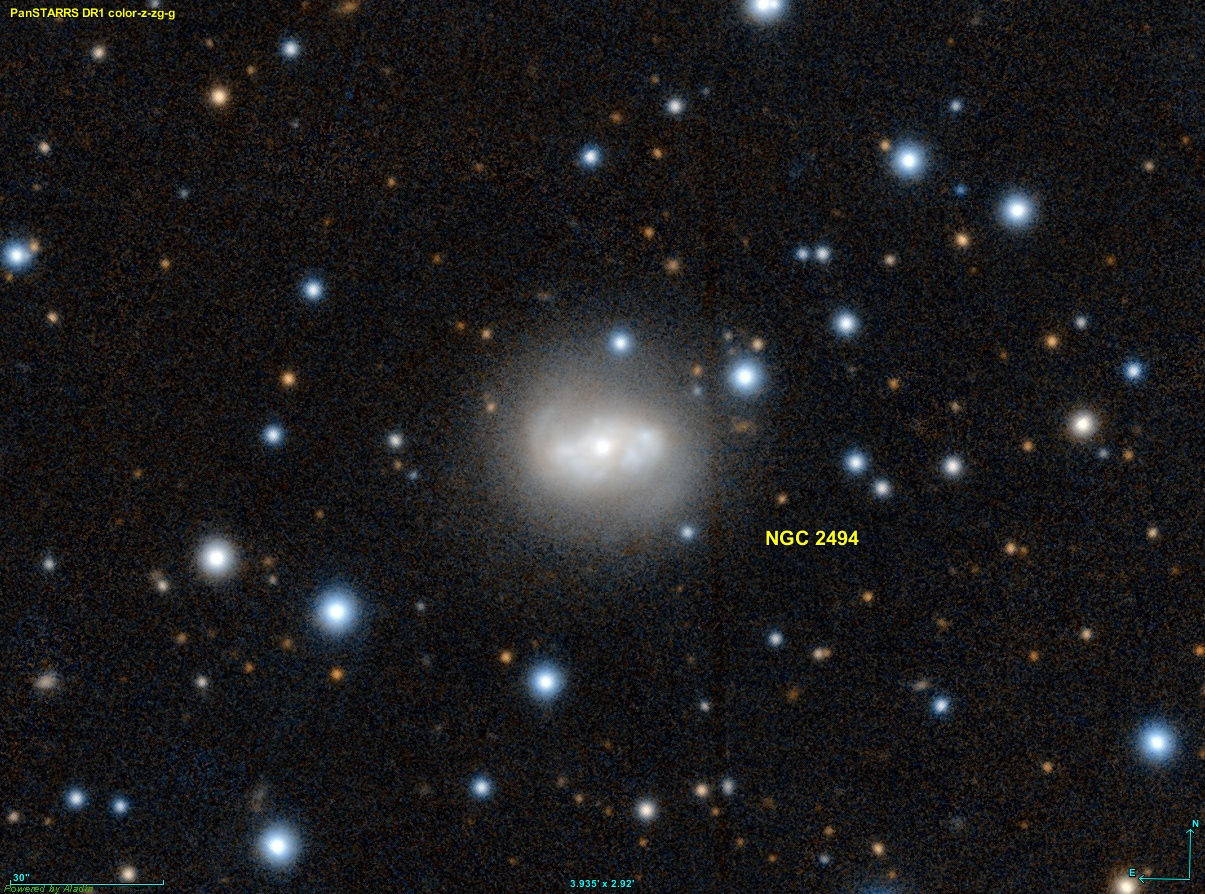
- PAN-STARRS image of NGC 2494

Observation data (J2000 epoch)
- Constellation: Monoceros
- Right ascension: 07^{h} 59^{m} 07.1188^{s}
- Declination: −00° 38′ 16.626″
- Redshift: 0.011955 0.000103
- Heliocentric radial velocity: 3,594 km/s
- Distance: 183 Mly (56.1 Mpc)
- Apparent magnitude (V): 13.4

Characteristics
- Type: (R')SB0/a(rs)
- Size: 58,000 ly

Other designations
- IRAS F07565-0030, IC 487, UGC 4141, LEDA 22377, MCG +00-21-001, PGC 22377, CGCG 003-002

NGC 2494 is a barred lenticular galaxy located in the constellation Monoceros. It is 183 million light-years away and about 58,000 light-years in diameter.

== Details ==
NGC 2494 was discovered on February 6, 1864, by Albert Marth who listed it as NGC 2494. Subsequently, on February 3, 1888, it was observed again by Lewis Swift who gave it the designation as IC 487. It has a broad H II region and a magnitude brightness of 12.60.
