= NGC 7466 =

Galaxy in the constellation Pegasus

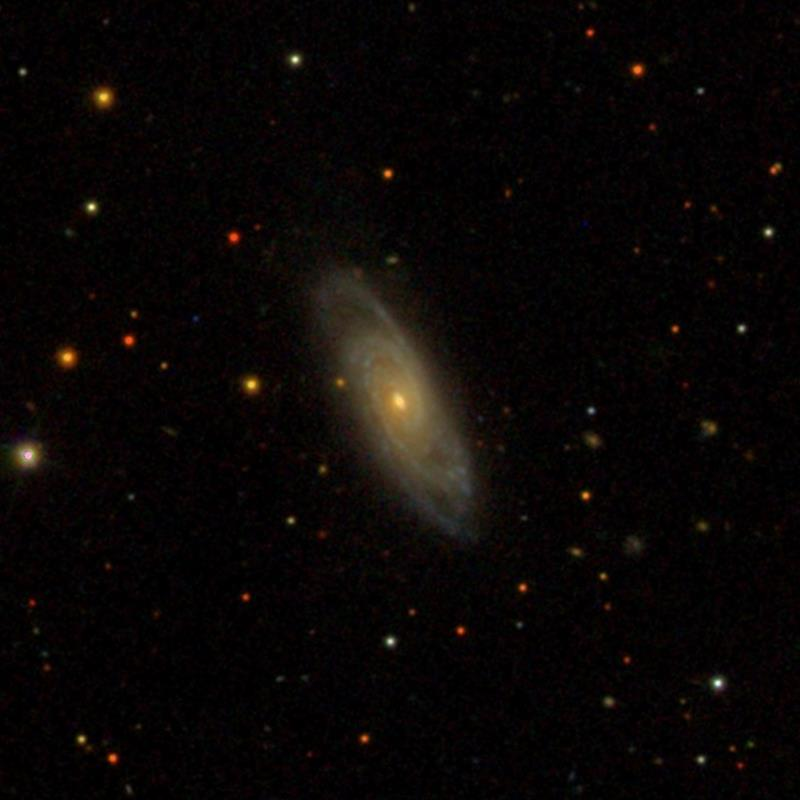
- NGC 7466 imaged by SDSS

Observation data (J2000 epoch)
- Constellation: Pegasus
- Right ascension: 23^{h} 02^{m} 03.4738^{s}
- Declination: +27° 03′ 09.456″
- Redshift: 0.025044
- Heliocentric radial velocity: 7508 ± 3 km/s
- Distance: 344.4 ± 24.1 Mly (105.60 ± 7.40 Mpc)
- Apparent magnitude (V): 13.5

Characteristics
- Type: Sb
- Size: ~138,000 ly (42.32 kpc) (estimated)
- Apparent size (V): 1.5′ × 0.5′

Other designations
- IRAS 22596+2647, 2MASX J23020343+2703093, IC 5281, UGC 12319, MCG +04-54-017, Mrk 1127, PGC 70299, CGCG 475-023

NGC 7466 is a spiral galaxy in the constellation of Pegasus. Its velocity with respect to the cosmic microwave background is 7160 ± 25 km/s, which corresponds to a Hubble distance of 105.60 ± 7.40 Mpc (~344 million light-years). It was discovered by French astronomer Édouard Stephan on 20 September 1873. It was independently rediscovered by the French astronomer Guillaume Bigourdan on 19 November 1895 and listed as IC 5281 in the Index Catalogue.

NGC 7466 is listed as a Seyfert II Galaxy, i.e. it has a quasar-like nucleus with very high surface brightnesses whose spectra reveal strong, high-ionisation emission lines, but unlike quasars, the host galaxy is clearly detectable.

NGC 7466 is a galaxy with a nucleus that has excessive amounts of ultraviolet emissions, and is thus listed in the Markarian Galaxy Catalog as Mrk 1127.

== Supernova ==
One supernova has been observed in NGC 7466: SN 2023uu (Type Ia, mag. 20.1) was discovered by The Young Supernova Experiment (YSE) on 15 January 2023.

== See also ==
- List of NGC objects (7001–7840)
