= NGC 6056 =

Galaxy in the constellation Hercules

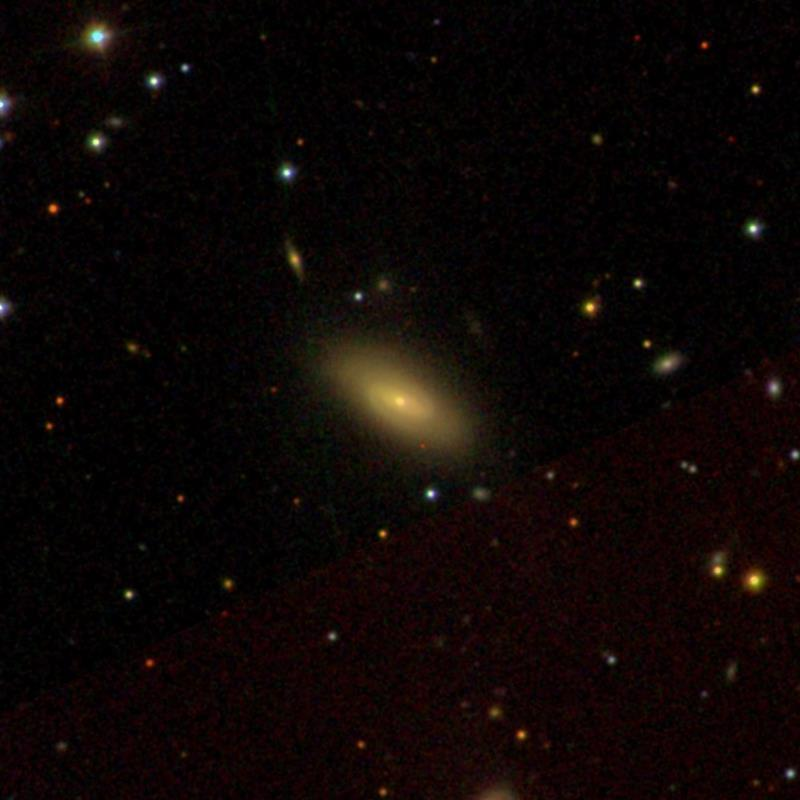
- SDSS image of NGC 6056.

Observation data (J2000 epoch)
- Constellation: Hercules
- Right ascension: 16^{h} 05^{m} 31.3^{s}
- Declination: 17° 57′ 49″
- Redshift: 0.039327
- Heliocentric radial velocity: 11790 km/s
- Distance: 161 Mpc (525 Mly)
- Group or cluster: Hercules Cluster
- Apparent magnitude (V): 14.6

Characteristics
- Type: SB0^+(s)
- Size: ~183,000 ly (56.1 kpc) (estimated)
- Apparent size (V): 1.00 x 0.50

Other designations
- CGCG 108-122, IC 1176, MCG 3-41-100, PGC 57075

NGC 6056 is a barred lenticular galaxy located about 525 million light-years away in the constellation Hercules. It was discovered by astronomer Lewis Swift on June 8, 1886. It was then rediscovered by Swift on June 8, 1888 and was later listed as IC 1176. NGC 6056 is a member of the Hercules Cluster.

== See also ==
- List of NGC objects (6001–7000)
