= NGC 785 =

Galaxy in the constellation Triangulum

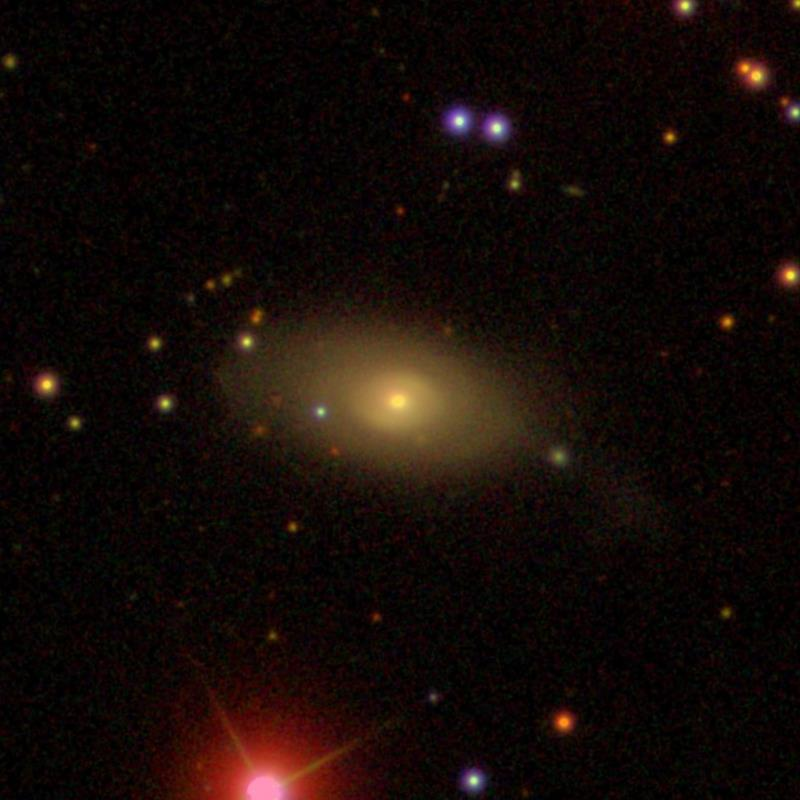
- A Sloan Digital Sky Survey (SDSS) image of NGC 785

Observation data (J2000 epoch)
- Constellation: Triangulum
- Right ascension: 02^{h} 01^{m} 40.0^{s}
- Declination: +31° 49′ 35.40″
- Redshift: 0.016601±0.000177
- Distance: 217 Mly (66.58 Mpc)
- Apparent magnitude (V): 12.8

Characteristics
- Type: S0^-?
- Size: 102,000 ly
- Apparent size (V): 1.66′ × 1.047′
- Notable features: N/A

Other designations
- IC 1766, MCG +05-05-046, UGC 1509, PGC 7694, LEDA 7694

NGC 785 is an elliptical galaxy located around 217 million light-years away in the constellation Triangulum. NGC 785 was discovered in 1876 by Édouard Stephan, and it is around 102,000 light-years across in diameter. NGC 785 is not known to have an Active galactic nucleus, and is not known to have lots of star formation.
