= IC 64 =

Galaxy in the constellation Pisces

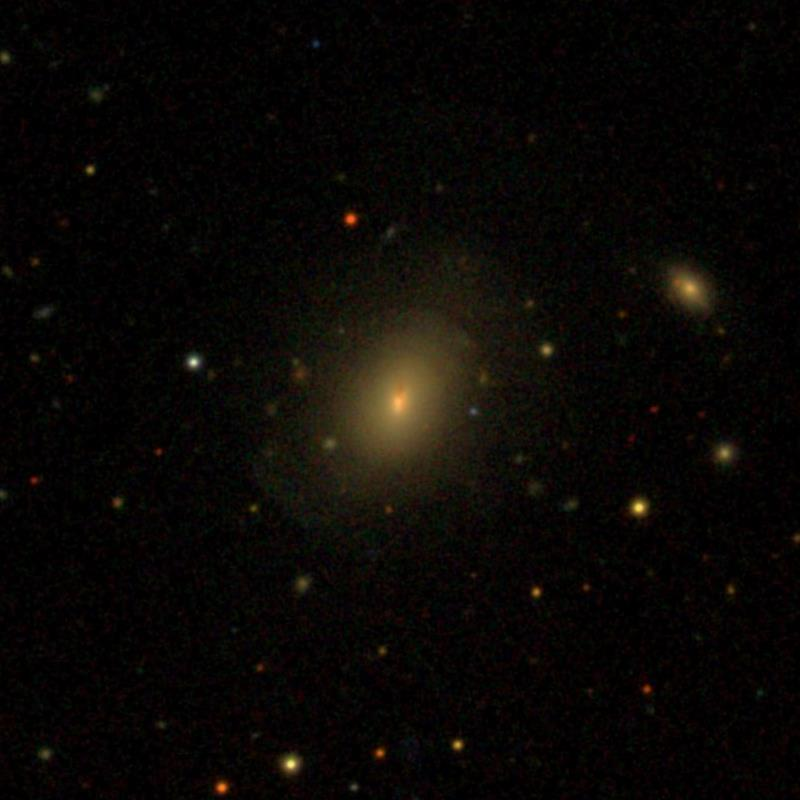
- SDSS image of lenticular galaxy IC 64

Observation data (J2000 epoch)
- Constellation: Pisces
- Right ascension: 00^{h} 59^{m} 24.4^{s}
- Declination: +27° 03′ 32.6″
- Redshift: 0.045932
- Heliocentric radial velocity: 13,738 km/s
- Distance: 622 Mly (190.7 Mpc)
- Apparent magnitude (V): 0.16
- Apparent magnitude (B): 0.22

Characteristics
- Type: E/S0/ AGN
- Size: 300,000 ly
- Apparent size (V): 1.3' x 1.1'

Other designations
- PGC 3550, UGC 613, MCG+04-03-031, CGCG 480-030, NVSS J005924+270332, LEDA 3550, NSA 128233, GB6 B0056+2647, RX J005924.5+270333

IC 64 is a massive lenticular galaxy located 622 million light-years away in the constellation Pisces. IC 64 has a diameter of 300,000 light-years, making it, three times bigger than the Milky Way and one of the largest galaxies observed. IC 64 was discovered by French astronomer Stephane Javelle on 5 December 1893. It has an active galactic nucleus, and is an emission line galaxy.
