= NGC 575 =

Barred spiral galaxy in the constellation of Pisces

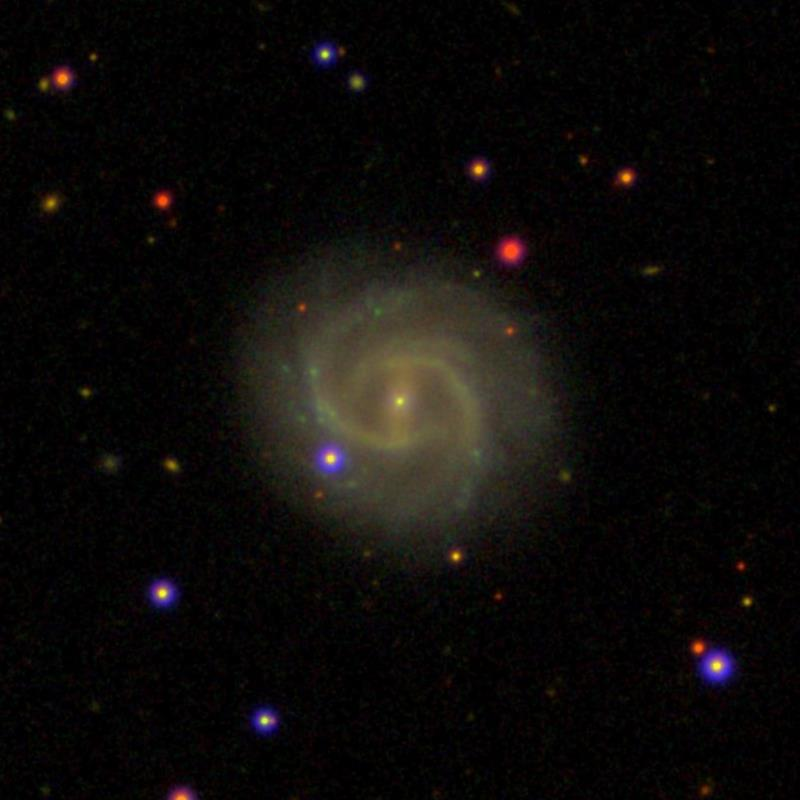
- SDSS image

Observation data (J2000 epoch)
- Constellation: Pisces
- Right ascension: 01^{h} 30^{m} 46.6^{s}
- Declination: +21° 26′ 26″
- Redshift: 0.010434 ± 0.000017
- Heliocentric radial velocity: 3128 ± 5 km/s
- Distance: 145 ± 10 kly (44.4 ± 3.1 kpc)h^{−1}_{0.73}
- Apparent magnitude (V): 12.9
- Apparent magnitude (B): 13.6

Characteristics
- Type: SB(rs)c
- Apparent size (V): 1.7 × 1.6 arcseconds

Other designations
- IC 1710, MCG+03-04-051, PGC 5634, UGC 1081

NGC 575 is a barred spiral galaxy of Hubble type SB(rs)c in the constellation Pisces. It is approximately 145 million light years from the Milky Way and has a diameter of about 70,000 light years.

The object was discovered on October 17, 1876, by Édouard Stephan (listed as NGC 575) and on January 18, 1896, by Stéphane Javelle (listed as IC 1710).
