= IC 2498 =

Galaxy in the constellation Leo

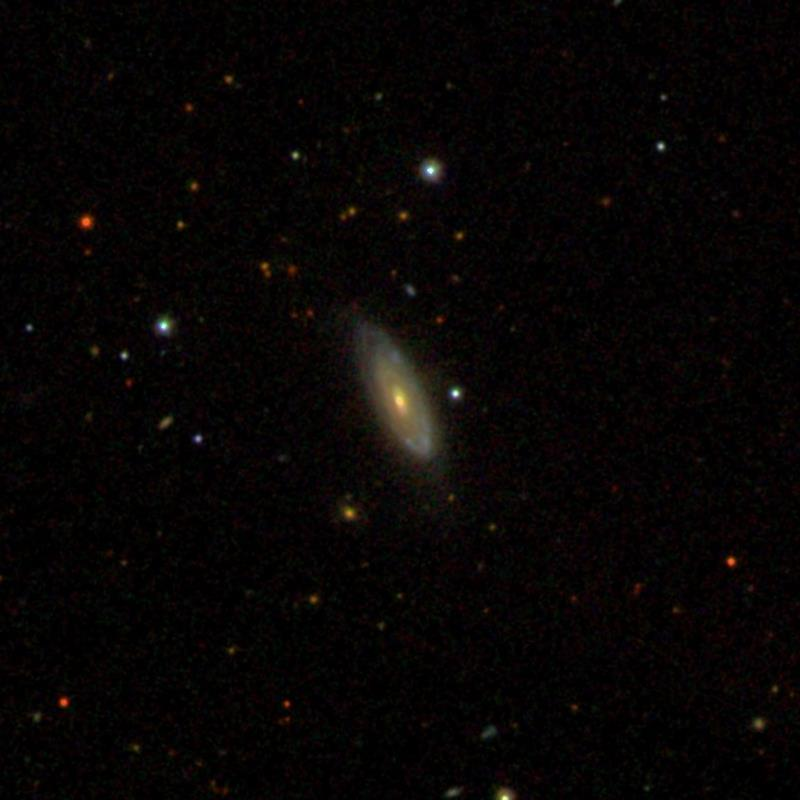
- Sloan Digital Sky Survey image of spiral galaxy IC 2498

Observation data (J2000 epoch)
- Constellation: Leo
- Right ascension: 09^{h} 41^{m} 21.93^{s}
- Declination: +28° 06′ 52.12″
- Redshift: 0.033006
- Heliocentric radial velocity: 9,895 km/s
- Distance: 469 Mly (143.7 Mpc)
- Apparent magnitude (V): 15.1

Characteristics
- Type: Sb
- Apparent size (V): 0.94 x 0.34 arcmin

Other designations
- CGCG 152-049, 2MASX J09412191+2806518, AGC 190436, NSA 085284, PGC 27668, 2MASS J09412193+2806519, SDSS J09412193+280652.0, UZC J094121.9+280652, LEDA 27668

IC 2498 known as PGC 27668, is a type Sb barred spiral galaxy located in constellation Leo. It is located 469 million light-years away from the Solar System and was discovered by Stephane Javelle on April 30, 1896.

== Supernova ==
One supernova has been discovered in IC 2498 so far: SN 2022eaf.

SN 2022eaf

SN 2022eaf was discovered on March 2, 2022 by a team of astronomers, J. Tonry, L. Dennau, H. Weiland from University of Hawaii, A. Heinze, B. Stalder from LSST, A. Rest from STScl, C, Stubbs from Harvard University along with other colleagues from Queen's University Belfast, Stockholm and ESO, on the behalf of ATLAS program (Asteroid Terrestrial-Impact Last Alert System). SN 2022eaf had a magnitude of 19.1, and a right ascension of (09h 41m 21s.597) with declination of (28 degrees 06' 38".24). The supernova had a redshift of 0.033006 and was classified as Type Ia.
