= Padua family =

Asteroid family

The Padua family (FIN: 507), also known as the Lydia family, is a mid-sized family of asteroids of more than a thousand members.

The family is at least 25 million years old. Its members were previously associated to 110 Lydia, and are predominantly X-type asteroids with an albedo of approximately 0.1. Together with the Agnia family, the Padua family is the only other family to have most of its members in a nonlinear secular resonance configuration, with more than 75% of its members in a z1 librating state.

The Paduan (Lydian) asteroids are located in the outer part of the central asteroid belt having a semi-major axis of approximately 2.75. The family's namesake is the asteroid 363 Padua, while 110 Lydia is now a suspected interloper, despite having the same spectral type.

== Members ==
Some prominent members with known spectral type. A list of all Paduan asteroids is given at the "Small Bodies Data Ferret".

Name	Type	Diameter	Albedo	Catalog	Refs
110 Lydia	X	86	0.1808	list	JPL · MPC
363 Padua	X	88	0.057	list	JPL · MPC
1517 Beograd	X	36	0.0448	list	JPL · MPC
1766 Slipher	C	20	0.057	list	JPL · MPC
2306 Bauschinger	X	21	0.0526	list	JPL · MPC
2560 Siegma	Xc	20	0.057	list	JPL · MPC
3020 Naudts	Sl	16	0.057	list	JPL · MPC
3670 Northcott	X	19	0.045	list	JPL · MPC
5087 Emelʹyanov	X	13	0.057	list	JPL · MPC
5103 Diviš	X	12	0.074	list	JPL · MPC
8450 Egorov	C	11	0.058	list	JPL · MPC
12281 Chaumont	X	16	0.032	list	JPL · MPC
Diameter and albedo figures taken from JPL's SBDB. Also see category.

== Lydia former namesake and potential interloper ==
In previous works (Zappala et al. 1995), this family was named Lydia after 110 Lydia, which is an X-type asteroid in the SMASS classification (Tholen: M-type). While Lydia is still a member of the now-called Padua family (Nesvorny 2005, AstDyS), it has been suspected that it might be an interloper in its "own" family despite its matching spectral type (Carruba 2009; Mothe-Diniz et al. 2005).

Also, the asteroid 308 Polyxo was formerly considered the family's largest member. This T-type asteroid is no longer considered a family member and is categorized as a background asteroid on AstDyS.
