= 1754 Cunningham =

Main-belt asteroid

Discovery
- Discovered by: E. Delporte
- Discovery site: Uccle Obs.
- Discovery date: 29 March 1935

Designations
- Named after: Leland Cunningham (American astronomer)
- Alternative designations: 1935 FE · 1938 RE; 1943 GH · 1951 FB; 1952 HO_{1} · 1952 KB_{1} 1954 UD_{1} · 1962 TG; 1967 EE · 1968 KR; 1969 PJ · A904 JB
- Minor planet category: main-belt · Hilda

Orbital characteristics
- Epoch 4 September 2017 (JD 2458000.5)
- Uncertainty parameter 0
- Observation arc: 112.53 yr (41,102 days)
- Aphelion: 4.6109 AU
- Perihelion: 3.2736 AU
- Semi-major axis: 3.9422 AU
- Eccentricity: 0.1696
- Orbital period (sidereal): 7.83 yr (2,859 days)
- Mean anomaly: 81.753°
- Mean motion: 0° 7^{m} 33.24^{s} / day
- Inclination: 12.152°
- Longitude of ascending node: 162.90°
- Argument of perihelion: 109.62°

Physical characteristics
- Dimensions: 79.52±1.7 km (IRAS:23); 83.55±1.66 km
- Synodic rotation period: 4.285 h 5.16±0.01 h (Note: Slyusarev (2012) web: rotation period 5.16±0.01 hours with a brightness amplitude of 0.08 magnitude. Summary figures for (1754) Cunningham at Collaborative Asteroid Lightcurve Link (CALL).); 7.7398±0.0003 h 7.7416±0.0005 h
- Geometric albedo: 0.031±0.001; 0.0345±0.002 (IRAS:23)
- Spectral type: Tholen = P · X · P B–V = 0.674; U–B = 0.256
- Absolute magnitude (H): 9.77 · 9.88±0.32

1754 Cunningham, provisional designation 1935 FE, is a Hildian asteroid from the outermost region of the asteroid belt, approximately 80 kilometers in diameter.

It was discovered on 29 March 1935, by Belgian astronomer Eugène Delporte at the Royal Observatory of Belgium in Uccle. It was later named after American astronomer Leland Cunningham.

== Orbit and classification ==
Cunningham is a dark and reddish asteroid and member of the Hilda family, a large group that orbits in resonance with the gas giant Jupiter and are thought to originate from the Kuiper belt. It orbits the Sun in the outermost main-belt at a distance of 3.3–4.6 AU once every 7 years and 10 months (2,859 days). Its orbit has an eccentricity of 0.17 and an inclination of 12° with respect to the ecliptic. It was first identified as A904 JB at Heidelberg Observatory in 1904, extending the body's observation arc by 31 years prior to its official discovery observation at Uccle.

== Physical characteristics ==
=== Rotation period ===
In July 2015, a rotational lightcurve of Cunningham was obtained from photometric observation by American amateur astronomer Robert Stephens at the Center for Solar System Studies in California. It gave a well-defined rotation period of 7.7416 hours with a brightness variation of 0.17 magnitude (U=3).

A similar period of 7.7398 hours with an amplitude of 0.16 was previously obtained by French and Italian amateur astronomers Pierre Antonini and Silvano Casulli in July 2008 (U=2). Other lightcurves gave a shorter period of 4.285 and 5.16 hours (U=2/n.a.).

=== Diameter and albedo ===
According to the surveys carried out by the Infrared Astronomical Satellite IRAS and the Japanese Akari satellite, Cunningham measures 79.52 and 83.55 kilometers in diameter, and its surface has an albedo of 0.035 and 0.031, respectively. The Collaborative Asteroid Lightcurve Link agrees with the results found by IRAS, that is an albedo of 0.035 and a diameter of 79.52 kilometers with on an absolute magnitude of 9.77. Cunningham belongs to a small group asteroids with a spectral P-type in the Tholen classification scheme.

== Naming ==
This minor planet was named in honor of American astronomer Leland Cunningham (1904–1989), who began his career as an assistant to astronomer Fred Whipple (also see 1940 Whipple) at Harvard University in the 1930s and worked at the Leuschner Observatory of University of California during the 1940s and 1950s. The official naming citation was published by the Minor Planet Center on 20 February 1976 (M.P.C. 3934). Cunningham discovered four minor planets himself and was a prolific computer of cometary orbits and observer of faint comets, including comet Gale, a lost comet he recovered in 1938.
