= Dejanira =

Dejanira may refer to:

- An alternative spelling of the princess Deianira, wife of Hercules
- 157 Dejanira, an asteroid
- Dejanira (insect), a beetle in the family Cerambycidae
