= 308 (disambiguation) =

308 or .308 may refer to:

- 308, year 308 AD
- 308 BC
- 308 (number)
- .308 caliber, firearms cartridges with bullet diameters of 0.308 inches (7.62 mm)
  - .308 Winchester, a popular rifle cartridge
- British Rail Class 308, an electric multiple unit train
- Peugeot 308, a small family car
- 308 Polyxo, a main-belt asteroid
- Ross 308, a breed of fast-growing chicken
- Several cars produced by Ferrari:
  - Ferrari 308 GT4, a sports car
  - Ferrari 308 GTB/GTS, a sports car
- USS William Jones (DD-308) warship
- The 308 cubic inch Holden V8 engine
