= 35P/Herschel–Rigollet =

Halley-type comet

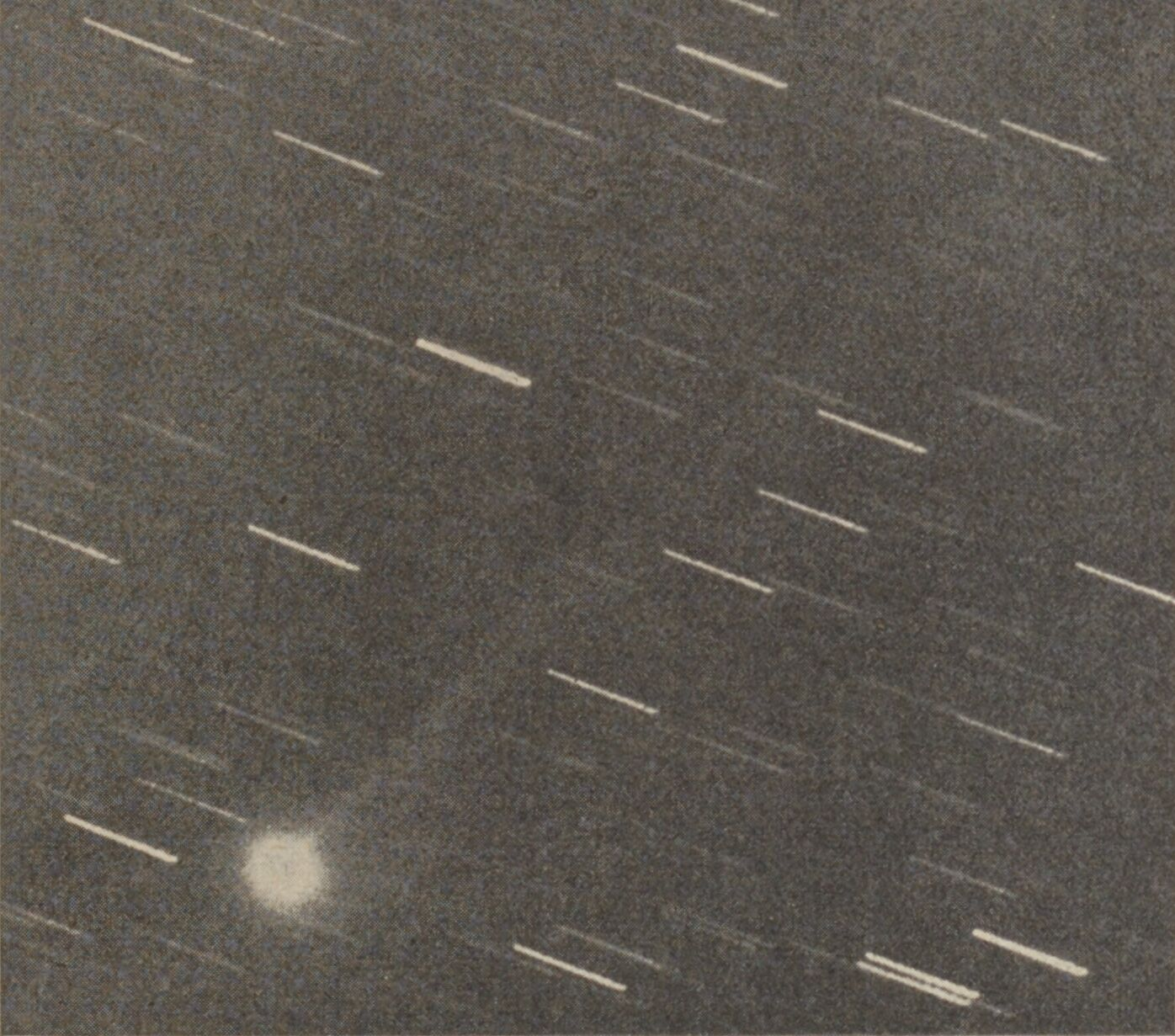
- Comet Herschel–Rigollet photographed by Ferdinand Quénisset on 14 August 1939

Discovery
- Discovered by: Caroline Herschel; Roger Rigollet
- Discovery site: Slough, Great Britain; Lagny, France
- Discovery date: 21 December 1788; 28 July 1939

Designations
- MPC designation: P/1788 Y1, P/1939 O1
- Alternative designations: 1788 II, 1939 VI, 1939h

Orbital characteristics
- Epoch: 5 August 1939 (JD 2429480.5)
- Observation arc: 151.07 years (Note: Observation arc from the Minor Planet Center database only covered dates from 29 July 1939 until 6 September 1939 (39 days). This figure included its entire arc from 21 December 1788 to 16 January 1940.)
- Number of observations: 75
- Aphelion: 56.939 AU
- Perihelion: 0.748 AU
- Semi-major axis: 28.844 AU
- Eccentricity: 0.97405
- Orbital period: 155 years
- Inclination: 64.207°
- Longitude of ascending node: 355.98°
- Argument of periapsis: 29.298°
- Mean anomaly: 359.97°
- Last perihelion: 9 August 1939
- Next perihelion: 13 February 2092 (MPC); 17 February 2092 (JPL); 16 March 2092
- T_{Jupiter}: 0.644
- Comet total magnitude (M1): 8.3

35P/Herschel–Rigollet is a Halley-type comet with an orbital period of 155 years and an orbital inclination of 64 degrees. It was first discovered by Caroline Herschel on 21 December 1788. Given that the comet has a 155-year orbit involving asymmetric outgassing, and astrometric observations in 1939 were not as precise as modern observations, predictions for the next perihelion passage in 2092 vary by about a month.

== Observational history ==
=== 1789 apparition ===
Caroline Herschel first observed the comet on 21 December 1788 and it was observed later that night by her brother William Herschel who described it as looking like a bright nebula and about 5–6 minutes in diameter, and much larger than the planetary nebula, Messier 57. Its discovery marked the second of five comets discovered by Caroline Herschel. (Note: Caroline Herschel's other four comet discoveries were; C/1786 P1 (Herschel), C/1790 A1 (Herschel), C/1790 H1 (Herschel), and C/1791 X1 (Herschel).)

Through December and January the comet was observed by Nevil Maskelyne at the Greenwich Observatory and by Charles Messier at the Paris Observatory. Maskelyne was the last observer of the comet, his final observation taking place on 5 February 1789.

Similar possible orbits for the comet were calculated in 1789 by Pierre Méchain and in 1922 by Margaretta Palmer. Palmer considered that the orbit which best fitted the observations was an elliptical one with a period of 1,066 years.

=== 1939 apparition ===
Roger Rigollet rediscovered the comet on 28 July 1939; it was described as diffuse and with a magnitude of 8.0. The sighting was confirmed the next day by Alfonso Fresa of the Observatory of Turin (Italy) and George van Biesbroeck of the Yerkes Observatory. The comet steadily faded after August, final (photographic) observations being obtained on 16 January 1940. The comet was also extensively observed from the Incheon Meteorological Observatory between July and September 1939. W. H. Dirk captured a series of photographic plates of the comet alongside recording its positions from August to September 1939.

Following the 1939 rediscovery, the comet's orbit was calculated by Jens P. Möller (Copenhagen, Denmark), and Katherine P. Kaster and Thomas Bartlett (Berkeley, USA). A perihelion date of 9 August 1939 was indicated. Based on these early orbits, Leland E. Cunningham of the Harvard College Observatory suggested that the comet was likely identical with Herschel's Comet of 1788.

The final calculation of the orbit, by Brian G. Marsden in 1974, used 75 positions from both apparitions of the comet in 1788 and 1939–40 in addition to perturbations by planets, and linked the two sightings, with a perihelion date of 9 August 1939 and a period of 155 years.

== Closest approaches to Earth ==
- 4 November 1788 – 0.80 AU (120 million km)
- 30 July 1939 – 0.82 AU (123 million km)

== See also ==
- 109P/Swift–Tuttle
- 153P/Ikeya–Zhang

== Bibliography ==
- Kronk, Gary W.; Meyer, Maik; Seargent, David A. J. (1999). Cometography: A Catalog of Comets. Vol. 1: Ancient–1799. Cambridge University Press. pp. 487–489. ISBN 978-0-521-58504-0.
- Kronk, Gary W.; Meyer, Maik; Seargent, David A. J. (2009). Cometography: A Catalog of Comets. Vol. 4: 1933–1959. Cambridge University Press. pp. 102–104. ISBN 978-0-521-58507-1.

Numbered comets
Previous; 34D/Gale	35P/Herschel–Rigollet	Next; 36P/Whipple
