= 110 Lydia =

Main-belt asteroid

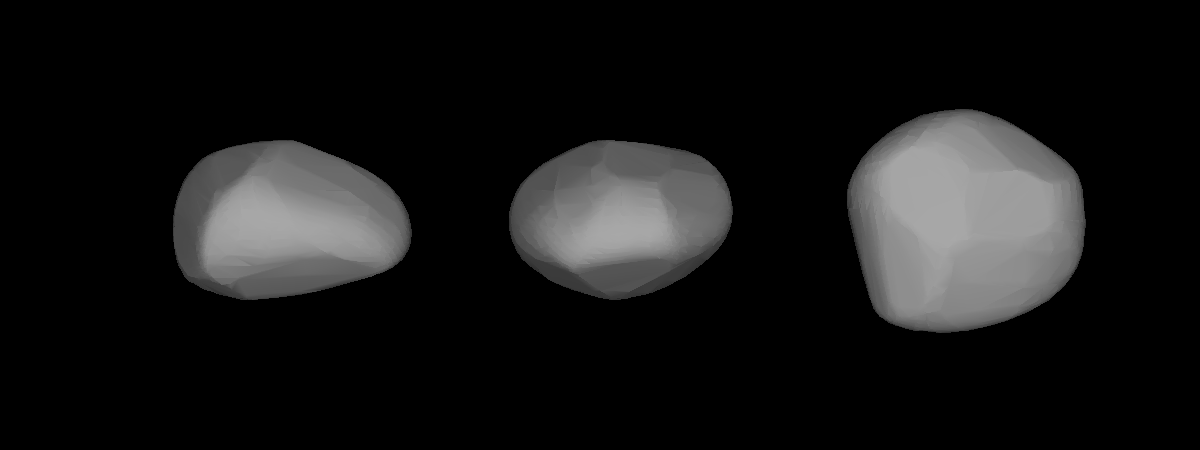
- Lightcurve-based 3D-model of Lydia

Discovery
- Discovered by: Alphonse Borrelly
- Discovery date: 19 April 1870

Designations
- Pronunciation: /ˈlɪdiə/
- Named after: Lydia
- Alternative designations: A870 HA; 1899 VA; 1972 YS_{1}
- Minor planet category: Main belt; Lydia family

Orbital characteristics
- Epoch 31 July 2016 (JD 2457600.5)
- Uncertainty parameter 0
- Observation arc: 145.80 yr (53,255 d)
- Aphelion: 2.9539 AU (441.90 Gm)
- Perihelion: 2.51115 AU (375.663 Gm)
- Semi-major axis: 2.7325 AU (408.78 Gm)
- Eccentricity: 0.081021
- Orbital period (sidereal): 4.52 yr (1649.9 d)
- Average orbital speed: 17.99 km/s
- Mean anomaly: 348.344°
- Mean motion: 0° 13^{m} 5.52^{s} / day
- Inclination: 5.9645°
- Longitude of ascending node: 56.871°
- Argument of perihelion: 283.499°
- T_{Jupiter}: 3.341

Physical characteristics
- Mean diameter: 78.5 ± 7.8 km (Note: Composite estimate.); 82 ± 10 km; 86.09±2.0 km; 86.090 km
- Mass: (1.483±0.015)×10^{18} kg (2025) (Note: Calculated from its standard gravitational parameter GM = 0.099±0.001 km^{3}/s^{2}.) (1.37±0.02)×10^{18} kg (2023)
- Mean density: 4.45 g/cm^{3} (2025) (Note: Assuming a diameter of 86.1 km.); 5.42±1.62 g/cm^{3} (2023) (Note: Assuming a diameter of 78.5 ± 7.8 km.)
- Equatorial surface gravity: 0.0134 m/s^{2}
- Equatorial escape velocity: 0.0480 km/s
- Synodic rotation period: 10.927 h (0.4553 d); 10.9258 hours
- Geometric albedo: 0.20 ± 0.02; 0.1808±0.009; 0.181
- Temperature: ~168 K
- Spectral type: M (Tholen); X (Bus); Xk (DeMeo et al.)
- Absolute magnitude (H): 7.83; 7.80

110 Lydia is a large belt asteroid with an M-type spectrum, and thus may be metallic in composition, consisting primarily of nickel-iron. It was discovered by French astronomer Alphonse Borrelly on 19 April 1870 and was named for Lydia, the Asia Minor country populated by Phrygians. The Lydia family of asteroids is named after it.

Observations made during 1958–1959 at the McDonald Observatory and in 1969 at the Kitt Peak National Observatory found an uneven light curve with a period of 10.9267 hours. In the late 1990s, a network of astronomers worldwide used light curves to derive spin states and shape models of 10 new asteroids, including (110) Lydia. They obtained a period of 10.92580 hours, with the brightness varying by no more than 0.2 in magnitude.

In the Tholen classification system, it is categorized as an M-type asteroid, while the Bus asteroid taxonomy system lists it as an Xk asteroid. Absorption features in the near infrared are attributed to low-iron, low-calcium orthopyroxene minerals. Water content on the surface is estimated at 0.14–0.27 by mass fraction (wt%). Measurements of the thermal inertia of 110 Lydia give a value between 70 and 200 J·m^{−2}·K^{−1}·s^{−1/2}, compared to 50 for lunar regolith and 400 for coarse sand in an atmosphere. It is a likely interloper in the Padua family of minor planets that share similar dynamic properties.

Lydia occulted a dim star on 18 September 1999.
