= Asterope =

Asterope may refer to:

- Asterope (mythology), several figures from Greek mythology, including:
  - Asterope (Hesperid), one of the Hesperides
  - Asterope (Pleiad), one of the Pleiades
- Asterope (butterfly), a butterfly genus
- Asterope, the IAU-approved proper name of the star 21 Tauri
- 233 Asterope, a main-belt asteroid
