= Baucis =

Baucis means several things:

- A character in the Greek legend of Baucis and Philemon
- Asteroid 172 Baucis
- Friend of the ancient Greek poet Erinna, apostrophized in her long poem The Distaff
- An ancient Greek wrestler from Troezen. According to Pausanias, Naucydes created a statue of Baucis.
- A fictional city in Italian novelist Italo Calvino's book Invisible Cities
