= IC 5145 =

Galaxy in the constellation Pegasus

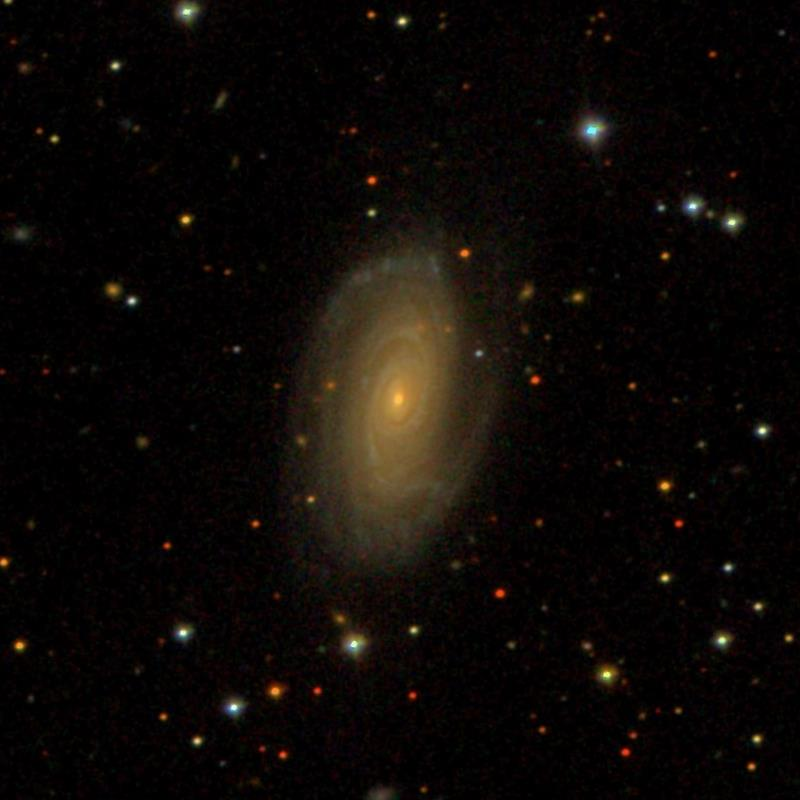
- IC 5145 imaged by SDSS

Observation data (J2000 epoch)
- Constellation: Pegasus
- Right ascension: 21^{h} 54^{m} 23.0673^{s}
- Declination: +15° 09′ 25.067″
- Redshift: 0.024594±0.000005
- Heliocentric radial velocity: 7,373±1 km/s
- Distance: 328.83 ± 15.36 Mly (100.820 ± 4.710 Mpc)
- Apparent magnitude (V): 14.30

Characteristics
- Type: Sab
- Size: ~186,700 ly (57.24 kpc) (estimated)
- Apparent size (V): 1.6′ × 0.9′

Other designations
- IRAS F21519+1455, 2MASS J21542306+1509249, 2MASX J21542304+1509244, UGC 11844, LEDA 67619, MCG +02-55-028, PGC 67619, CGCG 427-041, SDSS J215423.07+150924.9

IC 5145 is a type Sab spiral galaxy located in the constellation Pegasus. It is located about 328 million light-years from the Solar System. It was discovered by Edward Emerson Barnard, although the year he discovered it is unknown.

The luminosity class of IC 5145 is I-II and it has a broad H II region. Its dimensions measure 1.60 x 0.9 arcmin.

== Supernovae ==
Six supernovae have been discovered in IC 5145:

- SN 2002dn (Type Ic, mag. 18.6) was discovered by astronomer W. D. Li from University of California at Berkeley via unfiltered KAIT CCD images taken on June 15 and June 17, 2002. It was located 8".8 west and 18".3 north of the nucleus. A further inspection done by A. V. Filippenko, R. Chornock and R. J. Foley, using the Shane 3-m reflector at Lick Observatory confirmed SN 2002dn was Type Ic, which resembled SN 1987m.
- SN 2003hy (Type IIn, mag. 16.6) was discovered by British amateur astronomer Tom Boles on September 14, through unfiltered CCD images using a 0.35-m reflector as part of the course done by U.K. Nova/Supernova Patrol. SN 2003hy was also discovered by amateur astronomer Mark Armstrong who saw it on unfiltered CCD images taken with a 0.35m reflector. It was located 5".5 west and 12".5 north of the nucleus. A 14-minute exposure of SN 2003hy taken on December 28, 2003, shows it is much dimmer than 19.4 magnitude, which the dimmest stars are magnitude 20.
- SN 2010iq (Type Ic, mag. 18.2) was discovered by the Lick Observatory Supernova Search on October 11, 2010. It was reported by A. Narla, S. B. Cenko, W. Li and A. V. Filippenko from University of California, Berkeley through unfiltered CCD images. It was located 2".8 east and 4".4 south of the nucleus.
- PSN J21542359+1509224 was discovered by Bin Wang and Xing Gao on 13 May 2014. It was located 5".3 east and 0".9 south of the nucleus with a magnitude of 18.3. This supernova had an unknown type.
- SN 2020pkj (Type Ia, mag. 19.2) was discovered by the Zwicky Transient Facility on 15 July 2020.
- SN 2022lfa (Type Ic, mag. 19.21) was discovered by the Zwicky Transient Facility on 28 May 2022, using the Palomar 1.2m Oschin telescope on the behalf of K. De from Caltech. On 28 June 2022, astronomers classified it as Type Ic using the 3-m Shane telescope at Lick Observatory.
