= 173 Ino =

Main-belt asteroid

- VLT-SPHERE image of Ino

Discovery
- Discovered by: A. Borrelly
- Discovery site: Marseille
- Discovery date: 1 August 1877

Designations
- Pronunciation: /ˈaɪnoʊ/ EYE-noh
- Named after: Ἰνώ Īnṓ (Greek mythology)
- Alternative designations: A877 PA; 1922 SB
- Minor planet category: main-belt · (middle); Ino
- Adjectives: Inoan (/aɪˈnoʊən/ eye-NOH-ən)

Orbital characteristics
- Epoch 23 March 2018 (JD 2458200.5)
- Uncertainty parameter 0
- Observation arc: 138.75 yr (50,678 d)
- Aphelion: 3.3142 AU
- Perihelion: 2.1708 AU
- Semi-major axis: 2.7425 AU
- Eccentricity: 0.2085
- Orbital period (sidereal): 4.54 yr (1,659 d)
- Mean anomaly: 307.27°
- Mean motion: 0° 13^{m} 1.2^{s} / day
- Inclination: 14.197°
- Longitude of ascending node: 148.18°
- Argument of perihelion: 228.89°

Physical characteristics
- Dimensions: (162 × 152 × 123) ± 8 km
- Mean diameter: 145±3 km
- Mass: (3.01±0.16)×10^{18} kg (Note: Calculated from its standard gravitational parameter GM = 0.201±0.011 km^{3}/s^{2}.)
- Mean density: 1.89±0.16 g/cm^{3}
- Synodic rotation period: 6.110939±0.000001 h
- Axial tilt: 95°
- Pole ecliptic longitude: 28° ± 2°
- Pole ecliptic latitude: −17° ± 2°
- Geometric albedo: 0.061 (calculated); 0.059; 0.06±0.02; 0.0642±0.003; 0.07±0.05; 0.096±0.018
- Spectral type: Tholen = C SMASS = Xc/Xk; B–V = 0.705; U–B = 0.305
- Absolute magnitude (H): 7.80; 7.66; 7.91; 7.90

173 Ino is a large asteroid and the parent body of the Ino family, located in the central regions of the asteroid belt, approximately 150 kilometers (93 miles) in diameter. It was discovered on 1 August 1877, by French astronomer Alphonse Borrelly at Marseille Observatory in southern France, and named after the queen Ino from Greek mythology. The dark Xk-type asteroid has a rotation period of 6.15 hours.

== Orbit and classification ==
Ino is the parent body and namesake of the Ino family (522), an asteroid family in the intermediate main belt with nearly 500 known members. The adjectival form of the asteroid name is "Inoan".

It orbits the Sun in the central main-belt at a distance of 2.2–3.3 AU once every 4 years and 6 months (1,659 days; semi-major axis of 2.74 AU). Its orbit has an eccentricity of 0.21 and an inclination of 14° with respect to the ecliptic. The body's observation arc begins at Düsseldorf-Bilk Observatory in January 1879, five months after its official discovery observation at Marseilles.

== Physical characteristics ==
In the Tholen classification, Ino is a common carbonaceous C-type, while in the SMASS classification it is a Xk-subtype that transitions between the X-type and uncommon K-type asteroids.

Multiple photometric studies of this asteroid were performed between 1978 and 2002. The combined data gave an irregular, asymmetrical light curve with a period of 6.163 ± 0.005 hours and a brightness variation of 0.10–0.15 in magnitude. The asteroid is rotating in a slightly retrograde orientation.
