= 117 Lomia =

Main-belt asteroid

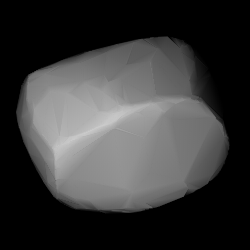
- 3D convex shape model of 117 Lomia

Discovery
- Discovered by: Alphonse Borrelly
- Discovery date: 12 September 1871

Designations
- Pronunciation: /ˈloʊmiə/
- Alternative designations: A871 RB;1900 DA; 1900 MC
- Minor planet category: Main belt
- Adjectives: Lomian

Orbital characteristics
- Epoch 31 July 2016 (JD 2457600.5)
- Uncertainty parameter 0
- Observation arc: 123.03 yr (44938 d)
- Aphelion: 3.0759 AU (460.15 Gm)
- Perihelion: 2.90810 AU (435.046 Gm)
- Semi-major axis: 2.99201 AU (447.598 Gm)
- Eccentricity: 0.028045
- Orbital period (sidereal): 5.18 yr (1890.4 d)
- Average orbital speed: 17.22 km/s
- Mean anomaly: 317.47°
- Mean motion: 0° 11^{m} 25.584^{s} / day
- Inclination: 14.902°
- Longitude of ascending node: 348.790°
- Argument of perihelion: 52.461°
- Earth MOID: 1.92459 AU (287.915 Gm)
- Jupiter MOID: 2.0407 AU (305.28 Gm)
- T_{Jupiter}: 3.204

Physical characteristics
- Dimensions: 148.71±6.6 km 146.78 ± 3.96 km (composite estimate)
- Mass: (6.08 ± 0.63) × 10^{18} kg (composite estimate) (3.15±0.58)×10^{18} kg (Note: Calculated from its standard gravitational parameter GM = 0.210±0.039 km^{3}/s^{2}.)
- Mean density: 3.67 ± 0.48 g/cm^{3} 0.66 g/cm^{3} (Note: Assuming a diameter of 209 km.)
- Equatorial surface gravity: 0.0416 m/s²
- Equatorial escape velocity: 0.0786 km/s
- Synodic rotation period: 9.127 h (0.3803 d)
- Geometric albedo: 0.0528±0.005; 0.053
- Temperature: ~161 K
- Spectral type: XC
- Absolute magnitude (H): 7.95

117 Lomia is a large main-belt asteroid that has a nearly circular orbit; the orbital eccentricity is 0.029. It was discovered by French astronomer Alphonse Borrelly on September 12, 1871, from the Marseilles Observatory. The preliminary orbital elements were published in the following year by German astronomer Friedrich Tietjen. The reason for the name is uncertain, but Lutz D. Schmadel believes it is most likely a misspelling of Lamia, the female demon of Greek mythology (the asteroid 248 Lameia is also named after this figure).

Photometric observations of this asteroid in 1985 gave a light curve with a period of 9.127±0.009 hours and a brightness variation of 0.29±0.03 in magnitude. The curve is symmetrical with a single maxima and minima. This object has a spectrum that matches an XC classification; occupying the transition range between an X-type and a C-type asteroid. It has an estimated cross-section diameter of ~148 km.

Eight occultations of stars by Lomia have so far been observed, between 2000 and 2018. Four of these events provided two or more chords across the asteroid, including a four-chord event in 2003.
