= NGC 2300 =

Galaxy in the constellation Cepheus

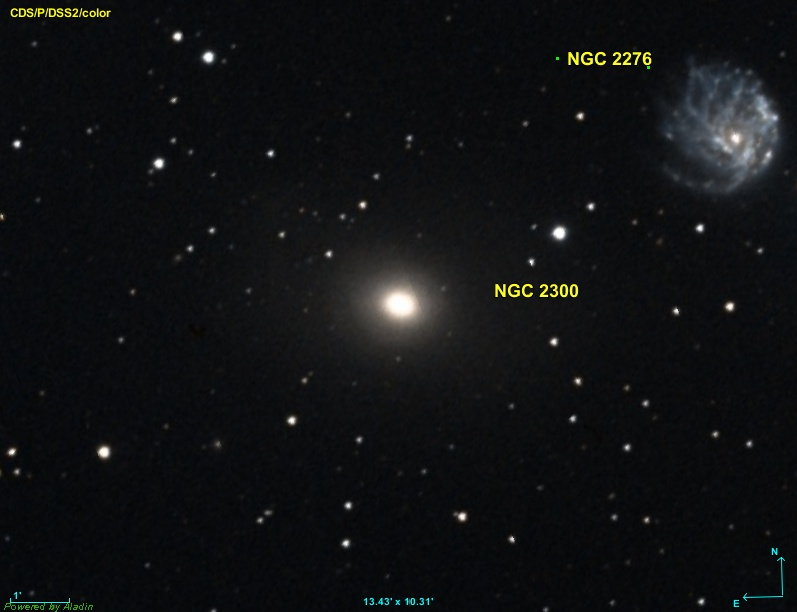
- NGC 2300 next to nearby galaxy NGC 2276

Observation data (J2000 epoch)
- Constellation: Cepheus
- Right ascension: 07^{h} 32^{m} 20.5^{s}
- Declination: +85° 42′ 31.9″
- Redshift: 0.00641
- Heliocentric radial velocity: 1,917 km/s
- Distance: 90.2 ± 6.3 Mly (27.67 ± 1.94 Mpc)
- Group or cluster: Arp 114
- Apparent magnitude (V): 10.76
- Absolute magnitude (V): −22.0

Characteristics
- Type: SA0^{0}

Other designations
- 2MASX J07322048+8542319, Arp 114, UGC 3798, MCG +14-04-031, PGC 21231

NGC 2300 is a lenticular galaxy in the constellation Cepheus. Its velocity with respect to the cosmic microwave background is 1876 ± 7 km/s, which corresponds to a Hubble distance of 90.2 ± 6.3 Mly (27.67 ± 1.94 Mpc). However, 11 non redshift measurements give a distance of 131.98 ± 21.75 Mly (40.464 ± 6.668 Mpc). The galaxy was discovered in 1871 by French astronomer Alphonse Borrelly using an 18 cm telescope.

NGC 2300 may be the closest discovered giant radio galaxy (GRG), it has large radio lobes that stretch roughly 3.5 million light years across. The radio lobes have an apparent size of 132 arcmin, the largest of any giant radio galaxy. However, the radio lobes host was not identified with certainty and they may be hosted by NGC 2276, but this is unlikely because it is a spiral galaxy.

According to the SIMBAD database, NGC 2300 is an Active Galaxy Nucleus Candidate, i.e. it has a compact region at the center of a galaxy that emits a significant amount of energy across the electromagnetic spectrum, with characteristics indicating that this luminosity is not produced by the stars.

Together with NGC 2276, they form the 114th object in Halton Arp's Atlas of Peculiar Galaxies.

== Supernova ==
One supernova has been observed in NGC 2300: SN 2024uai (type Ia-91bg-like, mag. 16.58).

== See also ==
- List of NGC objects
- List of NGC objects (2001–3000)
