= C/1907 L2 (Daniel) =

Non-periodic comet

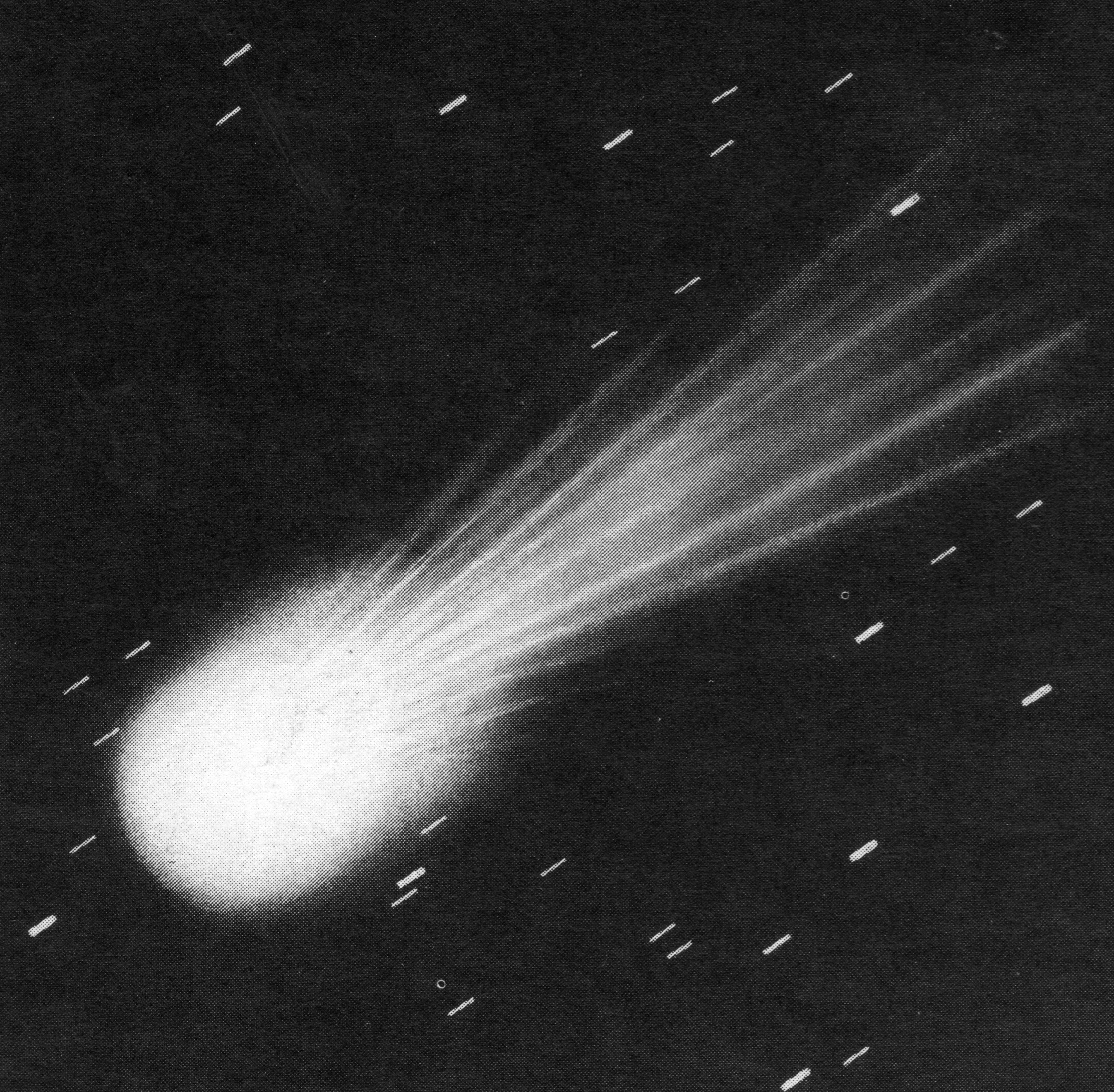
- Daniel's Comet photographed by Max Wolf on 4 August 1907

Discovery
- Discovered by: Zaccheus Daniel
- Discovery site: Princeton, New Jersey
- Discovery date: 10 June 1907

Designations
- Alternative designations: 1907 IV, 1907d

Orbital characteristics
- Epoch: 27 September 1907 (JD 2417845.5)
- Observation arc: 344 days
- Number of observations: 173
- Aphelion: 830.60 AU
- Perihelion: 0.512 AU
- Semi-major axis: 415.55 AU
- Eccentricity: 0.99877
- Orbital period: ~8,470 years (inbound); ~5,220 years (outbound)
- Inclination: 8.958°
- Longitude of ascending node: 144.27°
- Argument of periapsis: 294.47°
- Last perihelion: 4 September 1907
- T_{Jupiter}: 0.889
- Earth MOID: 0.058 AU
- Jupiter MOID: 0.417 AU

Physical characteristics
- Mean radius: 2.62 km (1.63 mi) (Note: Calculated mean radius using the formula: $\log_{10}\,(\,R\,)\ =\;0.9 +\;0.13 (\,H\,)$ Where $\,H\,$ is the comet's absolute total magnitude (M1))
- Comet total magnitude (M1): 3.7
- Comet nuclear magnitude (M2): 7.2
- Apparent magnitude: 2.6 (1907 apparition)

Daniel's Comet, formally known as C/1907 L2, is a non-periodic comet that became visible in the naked eye in 1907. It was the first of three comets discovered by American astronomer, Zaccheus Daniel.

== Discovery and observations ==
The comet was discovered by Zaccheus Daniel using a 15 cm (5.9 in) comet-seeker on the dawn of 10 June 1907, however its nature as a comet wasn't confirmed until two days later by William Robert Brooks. At the time, the object was located within the constellation Pisces. (Note: Reported initial position upon discovery was: α = 23^{h} 48.6^{m} , δ = –1° 08′)

The comet rapidly brightened as it slowly approached the Earth, and was closest at 0.757 AU (113.2 million km) on 2 August 1907. Edward E. Barnard made a series of photographic observations of the comet between 11 July and 8 September 1907, where he described the comet being visible to the naked eye for two months. At the same time, Edward C. Pickering also made several photographic observations between 12 July and 4 August 1907. J. Charles Duncan noted that the comet had reached magnitude 3.0 on 24 July 1907. Across the Atlantic, Max Wolf made extensive observations of the comet until 27 August.

It was last observed from the Chamberlin Observatory in Denver, Colorado, on the early morning of 30 June 1908.
