= 120 Lachesis =

Main-belt asteroid

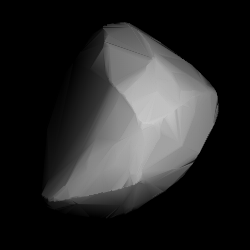
- 3D convex shape model of 120 Lachesis

Discovery
- Discovered by: Alphonse Borrelly
- Discovery date: 10 April 1872

Designations
- Pronunciation: /ˈlækɪsɪs/ LAK-iss-iss
- Named after: Lachesis
- Alternative designations: A872 GB; 1910 CF; 1918 UB
- Minor planet category: Main belt
- Adjectives: Lachesian (/læˈkiːʃ(i)ən, ləˈkiːʒən/ la-KEE-sh(ee-)ən, lə-KEE-zhən)

Orbital characteristics
- Epoch 31 July 2016 (JD 2457600.5)
- Uncertainty parameter 0
- Observation arc: 143.70 yr (52485 d)
- Aphelion: 3.2814 AU (490.89 Gm)
- Perihelion: 2.95390 AU (441.897 Gm)
- Semi-major axis: 3.11767 AU (466.397 Gm)
- Eccentricity: 0.052528
- Orbital period (sidereal): 5.50 yr (2010.7 d)
- Average orbital speed: 16.86 km/s
- Mean anomaly: 56.2095°
- Mean motion: 0° 10^{m} 44.558^{s} / day
- Inclination: 6.9643°
- Longitude of ascending node: 341.193°
- Argument of perihelion: 232.822°
- Earth MOID: 1.95464 AU (292.410 Gm)
- Jupiter MOID: 1.72275 AU (257.720 Gm)
- T_{Jupiter}: 3.204

Physical characteristics
- Dimensions: 155.132±1.133 km (IRAS)
- Mass: (4.27±0.36)×10^{18} kg (Note: Calculated from its standard gravitational parameter GM = 0.285±0.024 km^{3}/s^{2}.)
- Mean density: 2.18 g/cm^{3}
- Equatorial surface gravity: 0.0487 m/s^{2}
- Equatorial escape velocity: 0.0920 km/s
- Synodic rotation period: 46.551 h (1.9396 d)
- Geometric albedo: 0.0463±0.002
- Temperature: ~158 K
- Spectral type: C
- Absolute magnitude (H): 7.75

120 Lachesis is a large main-belt asteroid. It was discovered by French astronomer Alphonse Borrelly on April 10, 1872, and independently by German-American astronomer Christian Heinrich Friedrich Peters on April 11, 1872, then named after Lachesis, one of the Moirai, or Fates, in Greek mythology. A Lachesean occultation of a star occurred in 1999 and was confirmed visually by five observers and once photoelectrically, with the chords yielding an estimated elliptical cross-section of 184 × 144 km.

This body is orbiting the Sun with a period of 5.50 years and an eccentricity (ovalness) of 0.05. The orbital plane is inclined by 7° to the plane of the ecliptic. Photometric observations of this asteroid were made in early 2009 at the Organ Mesa Observatory in Las Cruces, New Mexico. The resulting light curve shows a synodic rotation period of 46.551 ± 0.002 hours with a brightness variation of 0.14 ± 0.02 in magnitude. It is a very slow rotator with the longest rotation period of an asteroid more than 150 km in diameter. As a primitive C-type asteroid it is probably composed of carbonaceous material.
