= NGC 2748 =

Galaxy in the constellation Camelopardalis

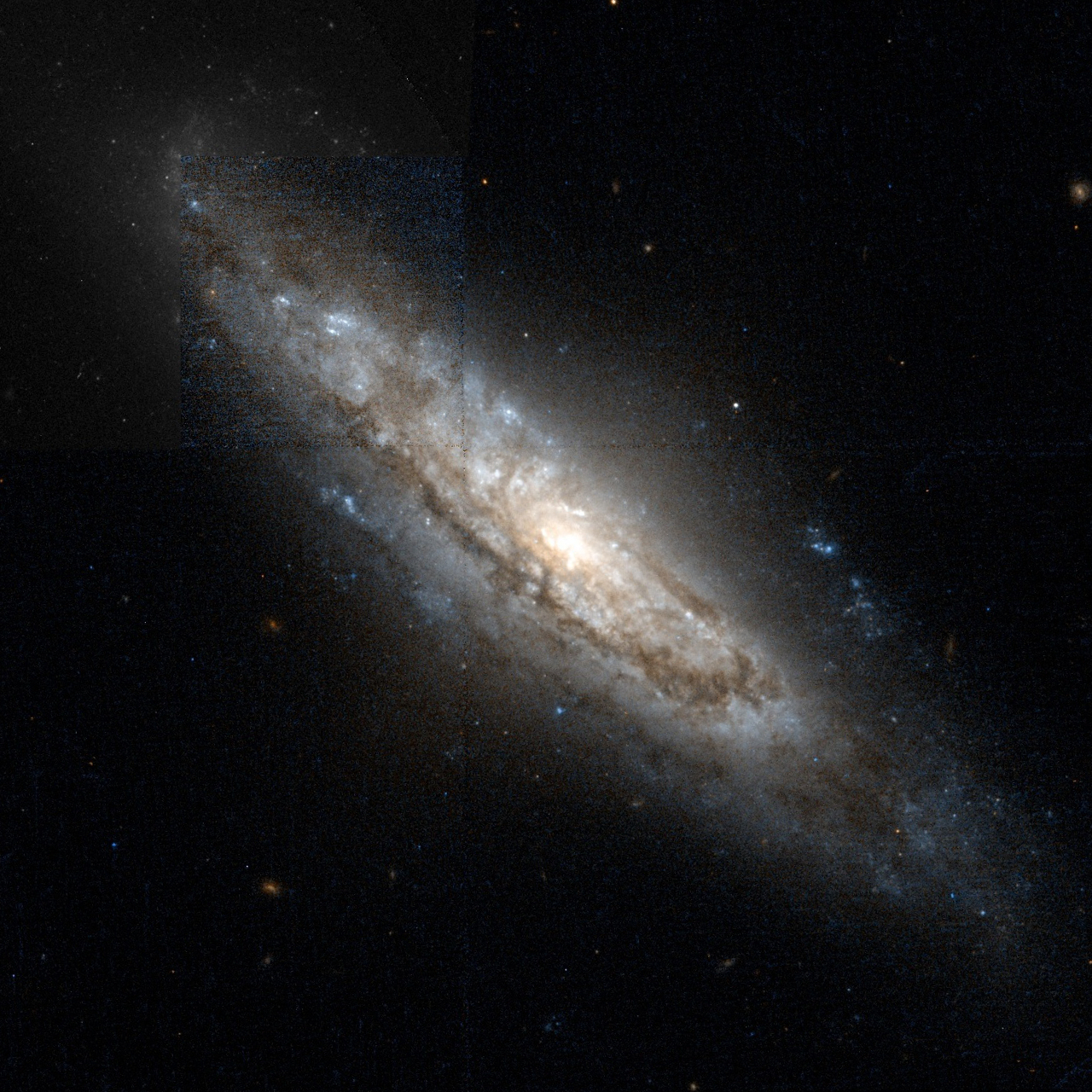
- NGC 2748 imaged by the Hubble Space Telescope

Observation data (J2000.0 epoch)
- Constellation: Camelopardalis
- Right ascension: 09^{h} 13^{m} 43.037^{s}
- Declination: +76° 28′ 31.23″
- Redshift: 0.004930
- Heliocentric radial velocity: 1,473 km/s
- Distance: 61.3 Mly (18.79 Mpc)
- Group or cluster: NGC 2655 group (LGG 165)
- Apparent magnitude (V): 11.7

Characteristics
- Type: SAbc
- Size: ~67,200 ly (20.61 kpc) (estimated)
- Apparent size (V): 2.250′ × 0.720′

Other designations
- IRAS 09080+7640, UGC 4825, MCG +13-07-019, PGC 26018, CGCG 350-014

NGC 2748 is a spiral galaxy in the northern circumpolar constellation of Camelopardalis, located at a distance of 61.3 megalight-years from the Milky Way. It was discovered September 2, 1828 by British astronomer John Herschel.

== Characteristics ==
The morphological classification of SAbc indicates NGC 2748 is an unbarred spiral with moderate to loosely-wound spiral arms. It is a disk-like peculiar galaxy with a stellar shell that is rotating about the main galactic axis. This shell was most likely formed through the capture and disruption of a dwarf companion. The galactic nucleus likely contains a supermassive black hole with a mass of 4.4+3.5
−3.6×10^{7} M_{☉}, or 44 million times the mass of the Sun.

== NGC 2655 group ==
NGC 2748 is part of the NGC 2655 group (also known as LGG 165). Other galaxies in this group are NGC 2591, NGC 2715, UGC 4466, UGC 4701, and UGC 4714.

== Supernovae and Luminous Red Nova ==
Four supernovae and one luminous red nova have been observed in NGC 2748.

- SN 1985A (Type Ia, mag. 14.5) was discovered by Thomas Schildknecht on January 25, 1985, located 3″ west and 10″ south of the galaxy's nucleus.
- SN 2013ff (Type Ic, mag. 16) was discovered by Raffaele Belligoli and Flavio Castellani on August 31, 2013. It was positioned 19″ west and 21″ north of the core of NGC 2748, and eventually reached magnitude 15.2.
- AT 2015fx (type LRN, mag. 18.3) was discovered by Kōichi Itagaki on 10 February 2015. The transient was originally classified as a luminous blue variable, a type of supernova impostor. Later analysis concluded that it was actually a luminous red nova.
- SN 2017gkk (Type IIb, mag. 14.7) was discovered by MASTER on 19 August 2017, and independently by Kōichi Itagaki on 31 August 2017.
- SN 2026yly (Type II, mag. 15.4) was discovered by Kōichi Itagaki on 9 August 2026.

== See also ==
- List of NGC objects (2001–3000)
