= 114 Kassandra =

Main-belt asteroid

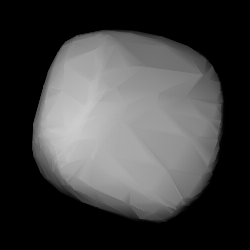
- 3D convex shape model of 114 Kassandra

Discovery
- Discovered by: Christian Heinrich Friedrich Peters
- Discovery date: 23 July 1871

Designations
- Pronunciation: /kəˈsændrə/
- Named after: Cassandra
- Alternative designations: A871 OA
- Minor planet category: Main belt

Orbital characteristics
- Epoch 31 July 2016 (JD 2457600.5)
- Uncertainty parameter 0
- Observation arc: 113.62 yr (41501 d)
- Aphelion: 3.0407 AU (454.88 Gm)
- Perihelion: 2.31581 AU (346.440 Gm)
- Semi-major axis: 2.67825 AU (400.660 Gm)
- Eccentricity: 0.13533
- Orbital period (sidereal): 4.38 yr (1600.9 d)
- Average orbital speed: 18.12 km/s
- Mean anomaly: 197.019°
- Mean motion: 0° 13^{m} 29.525^{s} / day
- Inclination: 4.9367°
- Longitude of ascending node: 164.222°
- Argument of perihelion: 352.208°
- Earth MOID: 1.3244 AU (198.13 Gm)
- Jupiter MOID: 1.94976 AU (291.680 Gm)
- T_{Jupiter}: 3.359

Physical characteristics
- Dimensions: 116 × 92 × 92 km ± 16%
- Mean diameter: 98±3 km
- Mass: (1.335 ± 0.597/0.264)×10^{18} kg (1.20±0.21)×10^{18} kg (Note: Calculated from its standard gravitational parameter GM = 0.080±0.014 km^{3}/s^{2}.)
- Mean density: 2.43/2.71 g/cm^{3} (calculated)
- Equatorial surface gravity: 0.0371 m/s²
- Equatorial escape velocity: 0.0603 km/s
- Synodic rotation period: 10.743552+0.000013 −0.000009 h
- Pole ecliptic longitude: 189°+4° −5° or 343°+6° −3°
- Pole ecliptic latitude: −64°+15° −6° or −69°+13° −11°
- Geometric albedo: 0.089±0.014; 0.0868 ± 0.0252
- Temperature: ~170 K
- Spectral type: T (Tholen)
- Absolute magnitude (H): 8.51, 8.275

114 Kassandra is a large and dark main-belt asteroid. It belongs to the class of rare T-type asteroids. It was discovered by C. H. F. Peters on July 23, 1871, and is named after Cassandra, the prophetess in the tales of the Trojan War.

This object is classified as a rare T-type asteroid, with parts of the spectrum displaying properties similar to the mineral troilite and to carbonaceous chondrite. The shape of the spectrum also appears similar to fine grain from the Ornans meteorite, which landed in France in 1868. The light curve for this asteroid displays a period of 10.758 ± 0.004 hours with a brightness variation of 0.25 ± 0.01 in magnitude.

In 2001, 114 Kassandra was observed by radar from the Arecibo Observatory. The return signal yielded a radar albedo of 0.12 ± 0.05.

== In popular media ==
The 2009 miniseries Meteor featured 114 Kassandra being sent on a collision course with Earth due to a comet impact and the effort by scientists to stop it.
