= NGC 2655 =

Galaxy in the constellation Camelopardalis

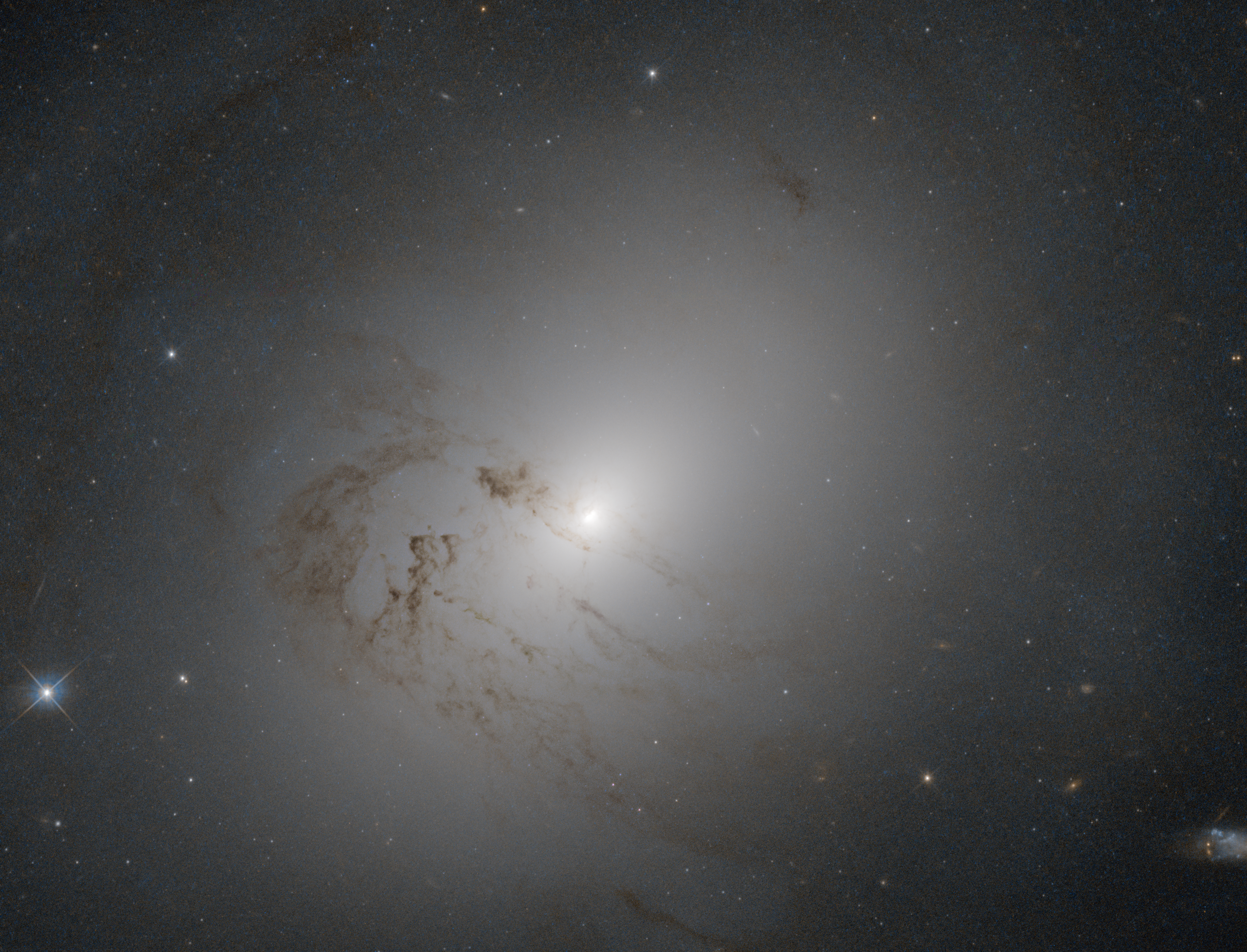
- The nucleus of NGC 2655 imaged by the Hubble Space Telescope

Observation data (J2000 epoch)
- Constellation: Camelopardalis
- Right ascension: 08^{h} 55^{m} 37.99277^{s}
- Declination: +78° 13′ 23.895″
- Redshift: 1,400±1 km/s
- Distance: 64 Mly (19.5 Mpc)
- Apparent magnitude (V): 10.1

Characteristics
- Type: SAB(s)0/a
- Apparent size (V): 4.9′ × 4.1′

Other designations
- IRAS 08491+7824, 2MASX J08553773+7813230, Arp 225, UGC 4637, MCG +13-07-010, PGC 25069, CGCG 349-033

NGC 2655 is a lenticular galaxy in the northern constellation of Camelopardalis. It is at a distance of 60 million light years from Earth. NGC 2655 is a Seyfert galaxy. The galaxy has asymmetric dust lanes in the centre of the galaxy, tidal arms and extended neutral hydrogen gas and may have recently experienced a merger. The complex dynamics of the HI and optical tails suggest the galaxy may have undergone more mergers in the past. A weak bar has been detected in infrared H band. The diameter of the disk of the galaxy is estimated to be 60 Kpc (195,000 ly).

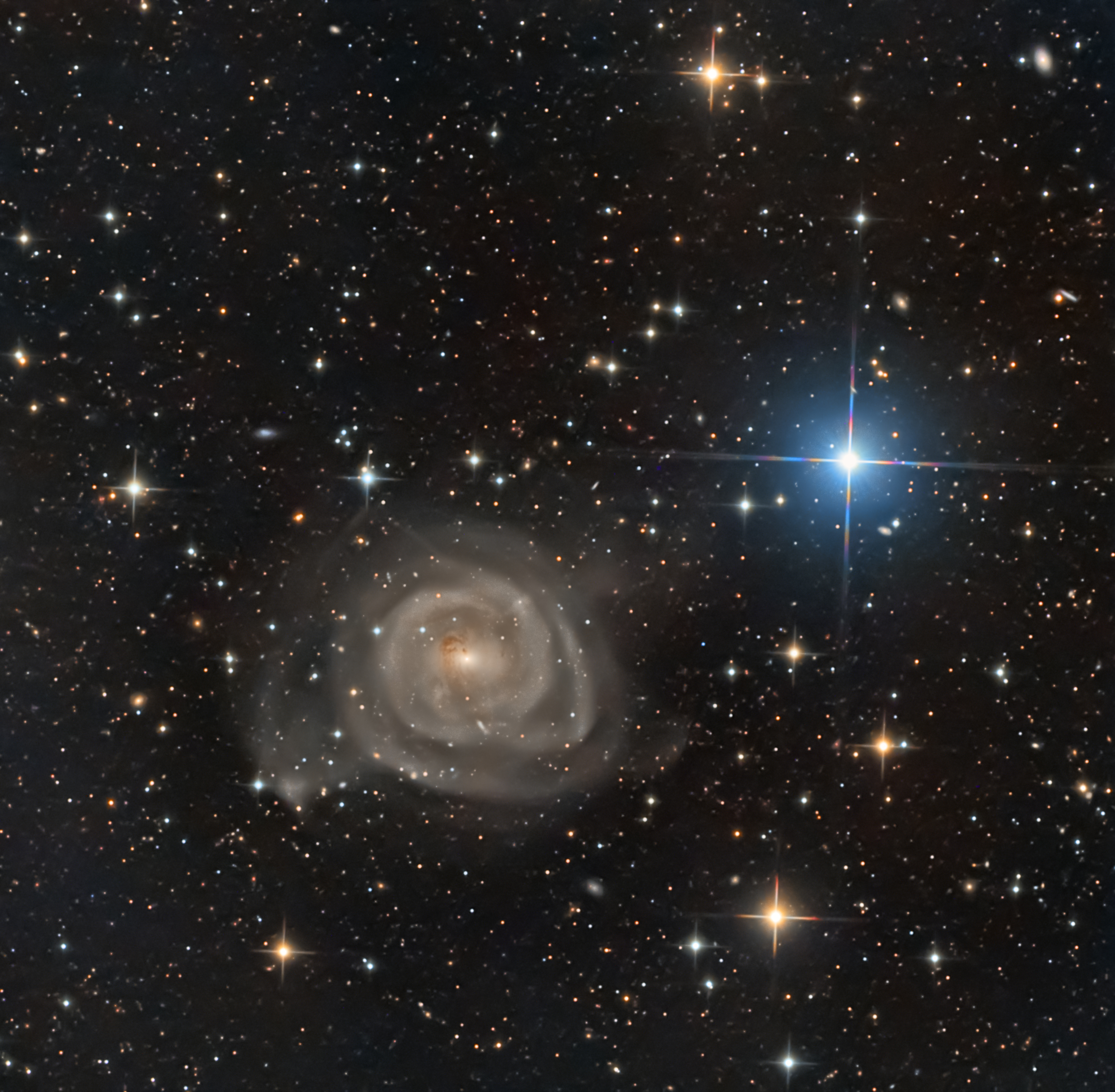
NGC 2655 from Planewave CDK24 in Julian, CA

William Herschel discovered NGC 2655 in September 26, 1802 and described it as very bright and considerably large. The galaxy can be glimpsed with a 4-inch telescope under dark skies nearly 10° from the north celestial pole.

NGC 2655 is the brightest member of the NGC 2655 group, which also contains the Sc galaxy NGC 2715, NGC 2591, and NGC 2748. One of the gas structures of NGC 2655 is trailing off toward the small galaxy UGC 4714.

== Supernova ==
One supernova has been observed in NGC 2655.

- SN 2011B (Type Ia, mag. 15.8) was discovered by Kōichi Itagaki and Masaki Tsuboi on 7 January 2011.
