= 1184 Gaea =

Asteroid

Discovery
- Discovered by: K. Reinmuth
- Discovery site: Heidelberg Obs.
- Discovery date: 5 September 1926

Designations
- Pronunciation: /ˈdʒiːə/
- Named after: Gaea (Gaia) (Greek mythology)
- Alternative designations: 1926 RE · 1930 OE; 1931 XG
- Minor planet category: main-belt · (middle); Aeria

Orbital characteristics
- Epoch 4 September 2017 (JD 2458000.5)
- Uncertainty parameter 0
- Observation arc: 91.06 yr (33,260 days)
- Aphelion: 2.8555 AU
- Perihelion: 2.4804 AU
- Semi-major axis: 2.6680 AU
- Eccentricity: 0.0703
- Orbital period (sidereal): 4.36 yr (1,592 days)
- Mean anomaly: 0.0836°
- Mean motion: 0° 13^{m} 34.32^{s} / day
- Inclination: 11.315°
- Longitude of ascending node: 355.75°
- Argument of perihelion: 311.34°

Physical characteristics
- Dimensions: 11.783±0.296 km 12.048±0.146 km 26.52 km (calculated)
- Synodic rotation period: 2.94±0.06 h
- Geometric albedo: 0.10 (assumed) (Note: Generic stony/carbonaceous composition with a compromise albedo of 0.10, for asteroids with an semi-major axis of 2.6–2.7 AU, according to LCDB's – 2. Taxonomic Class, orbital class, and albedo); 0.4512±0.0298; 0.462±0.061
- Spectral type: S/C (assumed)
- Absolute magnitude (H): 11.0 · 11.1 · 11.42±0.31

1184 Gaea, provisional designation 1926 RE, is an Aerian asteroid from the central regions of the asteroid belt, approximately 20 kilometers in diameter. It was discovered on 5 September 1926, by astronomer Karl Reinmuth at the Heidelberg-Königstuhl State Observatory in southwest Germany. The asteroid was named after the goddess of Earth, Gaea (Gaia), from Greek mythology.

== Orbit and classification ==
Gaea is a member of the small Aeria family (539), named after its parent body 369 Aeria. It orbits the Sun in the central main-belt at a distance of 2.5–2.9 AU once every 4 years and 4 months (1,592 days). Its orbit has an eccentricity of 0.07 and an inclination of 11° with respect to the ecliptic.

The body's observation arc begins at Heidelberg in November 1925, more than 2 months after its official discovery observation.

== Physical characteristics ==
The asteroid's spectral type is unknown. The LCDB assumes a stony (S) or carbonaceous (C) composition to be equally likely, while the overall spectral type for members of the Aeria family is that of an X-type. The high albedo figures obtained from observations with the WISE telescope do not agree with neither of these spectral types (see below).

=== Rotation period ===
In January 2011, a rotational lightcurve of Gaea was obtained from photometric observations by French amateur astronomer René Roy. Lightcurve analysis gave a short rotation period of 2.94 hours with a brightness amplitude of 0.09 magnitude (U=2). A low brightness amplitude also indicates that the body might have a spheroidal rather than an irregular shape.

=== Diameter and albedo ===
According to the survey carried out by the NEOWISE mission of NASA's Wide-field Infrared Survey Explorer, Gaea measures 11.783 and 12.048 kilometers in diameter and its surface has a high albedo of 0.462 and 0.4512, respectively.

The Collaborative Asteroid Lightcurve Link assumes an albedo of 0.10 – a compromise value between the stony (0.20) and carbonaceous (0.057) asteroids, both found abundantly in this region of the asteroid belt – and consequently calculates a much larger diameter of 26.52 kilometers based on an absolute magnitude of 11.0.

== Naming ==
This minor planet was named after Gaia (or Gaea), the goddess of Earth in Greek mythology. Her son and husband was Uranus, the god of the sky. Uranus and Gaia were the parents of the first generation of Titans (six males and six females), and the ancestors of most of the Greek gods. The asteroid's name was proposed by German ARI-astronomer Gustav Stracke after whom the asteroid 1019 Strackea was named.
