= 96 Aegle =

Main-belt asteroid

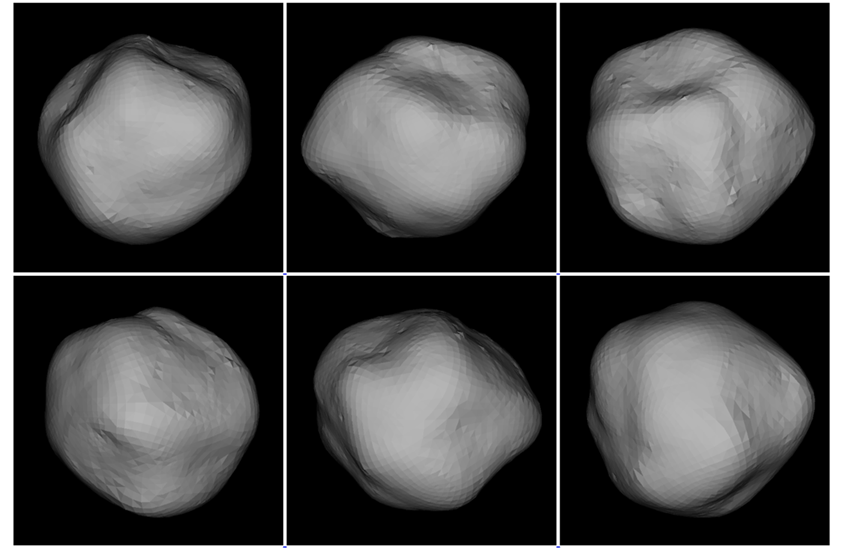
- Lightcurve-based 3D-model of 96 Aegle

Discovery
- Discovered by: J. Coggia
- Discovery site: Marseille Obs.
- Discovery date: 17 February 1868

Designations
- Pronunciation: /ˈɛɡliː/
- Named after: Aegle (Hesperid of Greek mythology) (Note: The Dictionary of Minor Planet Names cited in a previous edition: "Named after one of the Hesperides {see also planet (46)}. (H13).")
- Minor planet category: main-belt · (outer); Aegle
- Adjectives: Aeglean /ɛɡˈliːən/

Orbital characteristics
- Epoch 23 March 2018 (JD 2458200.5)
- Uncertainty parameter 0
- Observation arc: 149.92 yr (54,760 d)
- Aphelion: 3.4796 AU
- Perihelion: 2.6251 AU
- Semi-major axis: 3.0524 AU
- Eccentricity: 0.1400
- Orbital period (sidereal): 5.33 yr (1,948 d)
- Mean anomaly: 29.930°
- Mean motion: 0° 11^{m} 5.28^{s} / day
- Inclination: 15.963°
- Longitude of ascending node: 321.60°
- Argument of perihelion: 208.97°

Physical characteristics
- Dimensions: 178.7 km × 148.3 km (Note: Occultation by (96) Aegle on 5 January 2010. Occulted star: TYC 0572-01644-1. Derived asteroid dimension: 178.7 km × 148.3 km. Successful observations on the Sendai Space Hall.)
- Mean diameter: 167.92±5.49 km (composite estimate) Individual estimates: 156 km; 162.85 km (calculated); 164.77±2.54 km; 170.02±3.4 km; 177.77±1.54 km
- Mass: (4.55±0.43)×10^{18} kg (Note: Calculated from its standard gravitational parameter GM = 0.304±0.029 km^{3}/s^{2}.)
- Mean density: 1.55 g/cm^{3} (Note: Assuming a diameter of 178 km.)
- Synodic rotation period: 10 h (poor); 10.470 h (poor); 13.82±0.01 h 13.82±0.01 h 13.868±0.001 h (Note: Lightcurve plot of (96) Aegle, by Frederick Pilcher (2017) at the Organ Mesa Observatory (G50), with rotation period 13.868±0.001 hours. Quality code of 3. Summary figures at the LCDB and at Pilcher's ASLC project page.); 26.53±0.01 h (poor)
- Geometric albedo: 0.048±0.007; 0.0523±0.002; 0.056±0.002; 0.058 (assumed)
- Spectral type: Tholen = T SMASS = T Bus–DeMeo = T B–V = 0.775; U–B = 0.337
- Absolute magnitude (H): 7.54 · 7.65; 7.65±0.07; 7.67

96 Aegle is a carbonaceous asteroid and the namesake of the Aegle family located in the outer regions of the asteroid belt, approximately 170 kilometers (110 miles) in diameter. It was discovered on 17 February 1868, by French astronomer Jérôme Coggia at the Marseille Observatory in southeastern France. The rare T-type asteroid has a rotation period of 13.8 hours and has been observed several times during occultation events. It was named after Aegle ("brightness"), one of the Hesperides (nymphs of the evening) from Greek mythology.

== Orbit and classification ==
Aegle is the parent body of the Aegle family (630), a very small asteroid family of less than a hundred known members. It orbits the Sun in the outer asteroid belt at a distance of 2.6–3.5 AU once every 5 years and 4 months (1,948 days; semi-major axis of 3.05 AU). Its orbit has an eccentricity of 0.14 and an inclination of 16° with respect to the ecliptic. The body's observation arc begins at Litchfield Observatory (789) in August 1870, two and a half years after its official discovery observation at Marseille.

== Physical characteristics ==
In both the Tholen and SMASS classification as well as in the Bus–DeMeo taxonomy, Aegle is a rare, anhydrous T-type asteroid, while the overall spectral type for the Aegle family is typically that of a C- and X-type.

=== Rotation period ===
Photometric observations of the asteroid by American photometrist Frederick Pilcher from his Organ Mesa Observatory (G50) in New Mexico during 2016−17 showed an irregular lightcurve with a synodic rotation period of 13.868 hours and an amplitude of 0.11 in magnitude (U=3).

This result is in good agreement with two previous observations by Robert Stephens, and by Cyril Cavadore and Pierre Antonini who measured a period of 13.82 hours and a brightness variation of 0.12 and 0.05, respectively (U=3/2-). Other rotational lightcurves obtained by Alan Harris (10 h; 1980), by Italian (10.47 h; 2000), and Swiss/French astronomers (13.82 h; 2005), and at the Colgate University (26.53 h; 2001), are of poor quality (U=n.a./1/1/1).

=== Diameter and albedo ===
According to the surveys carried out by the Infrared Astronomical Satellite IRAS, the Japanese Akari satellite and the NEOWISE mission of NASA's Wide-field Infrared Survey Explorer, Aegle measures between 156 and 178 kilometers in diameter and its surface has a low albedo between 0.048 and 0.056. The Collaborative Asteroid Lightcurve Link assumes an albedo of 0.058 and calculates a diameter of 162.85 kilometers based on an absolute magnitude of 7.65. It has an estimated mass of (6.48±6.26)×10^{18} kg with a density of 2.61±2.53 g/cm^{3}.

=== Occultations ===
Aegle has been observed occulting stars several times. On 5 January 2010, it occulted the star TYC 0572-01644-1 as seen from Ibaraki, Japan, and allowed to determine a cross-section of 178.7 × 148.3 kilometers. In New Zealand, on 18 February 2002, it occulted the star TYC 7299-00684 in the constellation of Centaurus for approximately 12.7 seconds during which a drop of 2.1 in magnitude was to be expected. (Note: Occultation by (96) Aegle on 18 February 2002. Occulted star: TYC 7299-00684. Max duration 12.7 sec. Δmag 2.1. Diameter est. 168 km. Sourced from the Occultation Section of the Royal Astronomical Society of New Zealand (path prediction).)

== Naming ==
This minor planet was named after Aegle) one of the Hesperides in Greek mythology. The official naming citation was mentioned in The Names of the Minor Planets by Paul Herget in 1955 (H 13).
