= C/1909 L1 (Borrelly–Daniel) =

Non-periodic comet

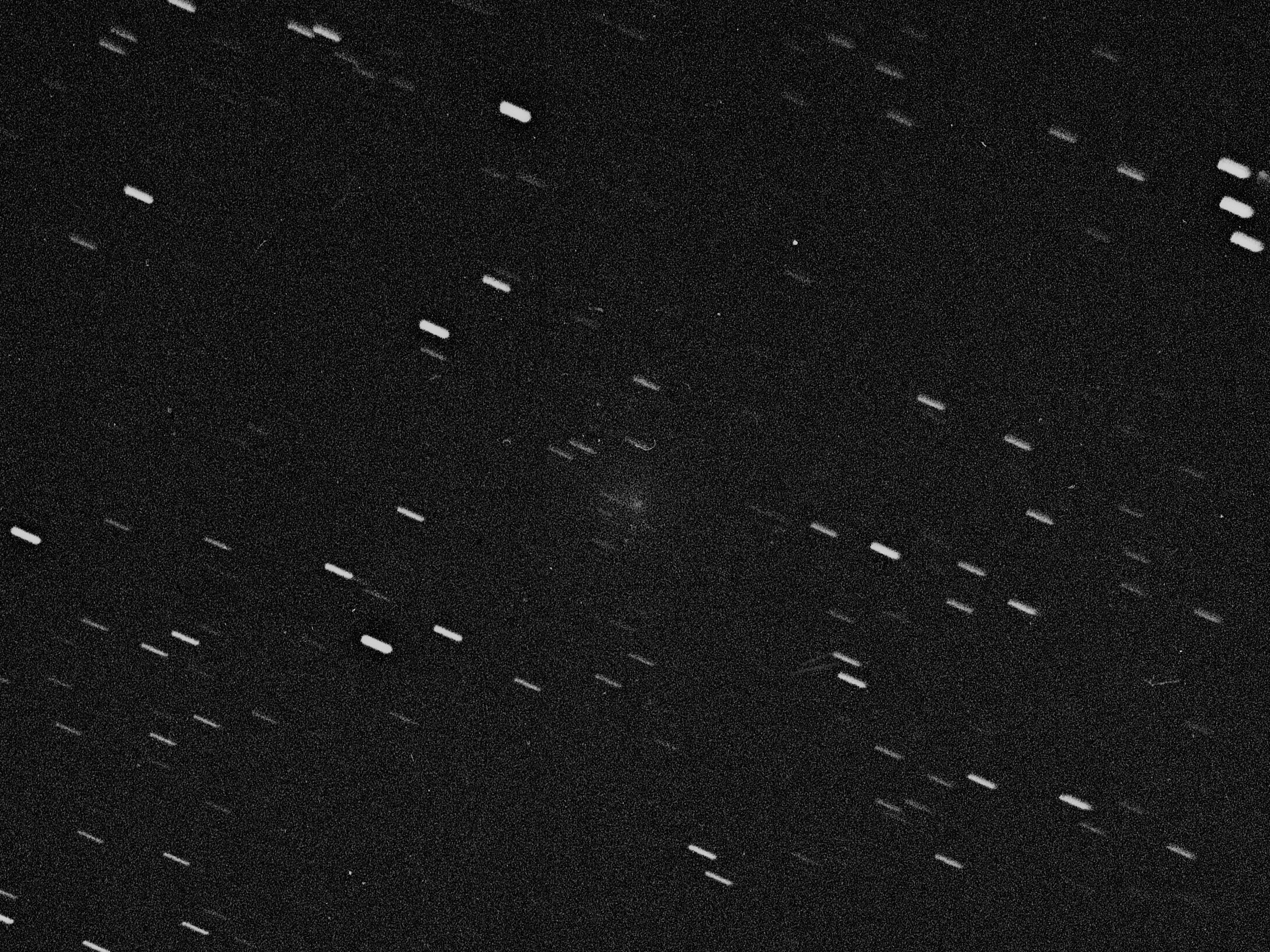
- Comet Borrelly–Daniel photographed by Max Planck from the Heidelberg Observatory on 9 March 1910

Discovery
- Discovered by: Alphonse Borrelly; Zaccheus Daniel
- Discovery site: Marseille, France; Princeton, USA
- Discovery date: 15–16 June 1909

Designations
- Alternative designations: 1909 I, 1909a

Orbital characteristics
- Epoch: 8 July 1909 (JD 2418495.5)
- Observation arc: 42 days
- Number of observations: 29
- Aphelion: ~350 AU
- Perihelion: 0.843 AU
- Semi-major axis: ~175 AU
- Eccentricity: 0.99519
- Orbital period: ~2,320 years
- Inclination: 52.081°
- Longitude of ascending node: 306.88°
- Argument of periapsis: 5.000°
- Mean anomaly: 0.014°
- Last perihelion: 5 June 1909
- T_{Jupiter}: 0.728
- Earth MOID: 0.171 AU
- Jupiter MOID: 2.861 AU

Physical characteristics
- Comet total magnitude (M1): 10.9
- Apparent magnitude: 9.0 (1909 apparition)

Comet Borrelly–Daniel, formally designated as C/1909 L1, is a non-periodic comet that was co-discovered by astronomers, Alphonse Borrelly and Zaccheus Daniel. It was the seventh comet discovery by Borrelly and the third one for Daniel. (Note: Coincidentally, this comet is also their final comet discovery.) About two weeks prior to discovery, the comet made its closest approach to Earth at a distance of 0.852 AU (127.5 million km) on 30 May 1909.
