= NGC 2276 =

Galaxy in the constellation Cepheus

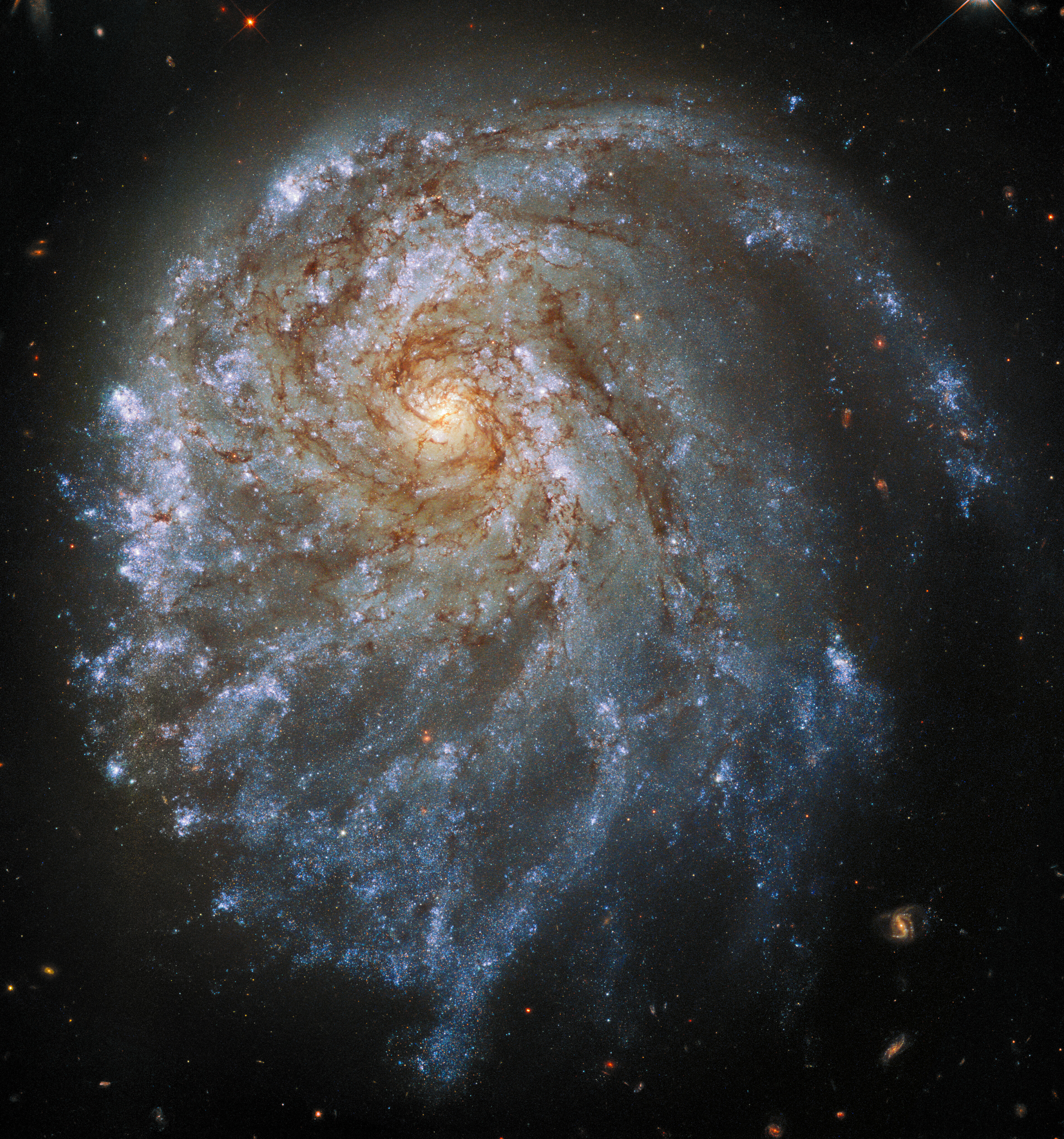
- NGC 2276 as imaged by Hubble

Observation data (J2000 epoch)
- Constellation: Cepheus
- Right ascension: 07^{h} 27^{m} 13.9755^{s}
- Declination: +85° 45′ 15.877″
- Redshift: 0.008062
- Heliocentric radial velocity: 2,417±1 km/s
- Distance: 120 Mly (36.8 Mpc)
- Group or cluster: NGC 2276 (LGG145)
- Apparent magnitude (V): 11.8

Characteristics
- Type: SAB(rs)c
- Size: ~57,100 ly (17.51 kpc) (estimated)
- Apparent size (V): 2.8′ × 2.7′

Other designations
- Arp 114, CGCG 363-027, IRAS 07101+8550, Arp 25, UGC 3740, MCG +14-04-028, PGC 21039, CGCG 362-042

NGC 2276 is an intermediate spiral galaxy in the constellation Cepheus. The galaxy lies 120 million light-years away from Earth. NGC 2276 has an asymmetrical appearance, most likely caused by gravitational interactions with its neighbor, elliptical galaxy NGC 2300. NGC 2276 is traveling with an orbital velocity of about 968 km/s relative to the NGC 2300 group of galaxies. Trailing NGC 2276 is a long tail of interstellar medium about 300,000 light-years (100,000 pc) long, formed by ram pressure stripping.

One of the many starburst spiral arms contains an intermediate mass black hole with 50,000 times the mass of the Sun, named NGC 2276-3c. NGC 2276-3c has produced two jets: a large-scale radio jet, approximately 2,000 light years long, and an "inner jet" about 6 light years long. The galaxy shows an enhanced rate of star formation that may have been triggered by a collision with a dwarf galaxy, or by the gravitational interaction with its neighbor compressing gas and dust.

NGC 2276 was discovered by Friedrich August Theodor Winnecke on 26 June 1876. In the Atlas of Peculiar Galaxies, the galaxy is mentioned twice, once as Arp 25, in the category spiral galaxies with one heavy arm, and with NGC 2300 as Arp 114, in the category elliptical galaxies close to and perturbing spiral galaxies.

== Supernovae ==
Six supernovae have been observed in NGC 2276:

- SN 1962Q (type unknown, mag. 16.9) was discovered by Shachbazian and Iskudarian on 25 February 1962.
- SN 1968V (Type II, mag. 15.7) was discovered by Shachbazian on 26 January 1968.
- SN 1968W (type unknown, mag. 16.6) was discovered by Iskudarian on 24 March 1968.
- SN 1993X (Type II, mag. 16.3) was discovered by the Leuschner Observatory Supernova Search on 22 August 1993.
- SN 2005dl (Type II, mag. 17.1) was discovered by Alessandro Dimai (bio-it) and Marco Migliardi on 25 August 2005.
- SN 2016gfy (Type II, mag. 16.3) was discovered by Alessandro Dimai on 13 September 2016.
