= 198 Ampella =

Main-belt asteroid

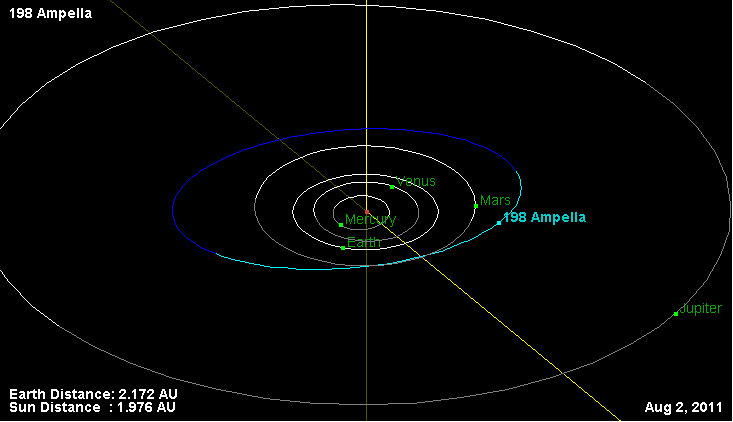
- Orbital diagram

Discovery
- Discovered by: A. Borrelly
- Discovery date: 13 June 1879

Designations
- Pronunciation: /æmˈpɛlə/
- Named after: Ampelos
- Alternative designations: A879 LA; 1957 YA_{1}
- Minor planet category: Main belt

Orbital characteristics
- Epoch 2026-Jun-09 (JD 2461200.5)
- Uncertainty parameter 0
- Observation arc: 131.26 yr (47944 d)
- Aphelion: 3.018 AU
- Perihelion: 1.901 AU
- Semi-major axis: 2.459 AU
- Eccentricity: 0.2271
- Orbital period (sidereal): 3.86 yr (1409 d)
- Mean anomaly: 331°
- Mean motion: 0° 15^{m} 20.196^{s} / day
- Inclination: 9.323°
- Longitude of ascending node: 268.2°
- Time of perihelion: 2026-Sep-30
- Argument of perihelion: 89.02°
- Earth MOID: 0.923 AU (138.1 million km; 85.8 million mi)
- Jupiter MOID: 2.52 AU
- T_{Jupiter}: 3.437

Physical characteristics
- Mean diameter: 54.323±0.343 km
- Mass: (2.62 ± 1.24/0.49)×10^{18} kg
- Mean density: 3.121 ± 1.477/0.588 g/cm^{3}
- Synodic rotation period: 10.379 h (0.4325 d)
- Geometric albedo: 0.268±0.035
- Spectral type: S
- Absolute magnitude (H): 8.58

198 Ampella is a main belt asteroid that was discovered by Alphonse Borrelly on June 13, 1879. The name seems to be the feminine form of Ampelos, a satyr and good friend of Dionysus in Greek mythology. It could also derive from the Ampelose (plural of Ampelos), a variety of hamadryad. It is an S-type asteroid.

So far Ampella has been observed occulting a star once, on November 8, 1991, from New South Wales, Australia.

This asteroid has been resolved by the W. M. Keck Observatory, resulting in a size estimate of 53 km. It is oblate in shape, with a size ratio of 1.22 between the major and minor axes. Measurements from the IRAS observatory gave a similar size estimate of 57 km. Photometric measurements made in 1993 give a rotation period of 10.38 hours.
