= Arduinna =

Celtic hunting goddess

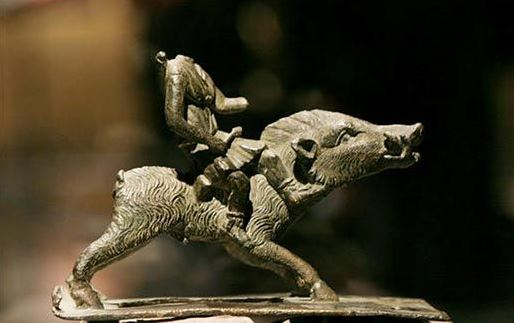
Bronze statuette of the Celtic goddess Arduinna riding a wild boar.

In Gallo-Roman religion, Arduinna (also Arduina, Arduinnae or Arduinne) was the eponymous tutelary goddess of the Ardennes Forest and region, thought to be represented as a huntress riding a boar (primarily in the present-day regions of Belgium and Luxembourg). Her cult originated in the Ardennes region of present-day Belgium, Luxembourg, and France. She was identified with the Roman goddess Diana.

== Depictions ==
In The Gods of the Celts, Miranda Green states that some depictions of Arduinna show her riding a boar. However, Simone Deyts notes that the bronze Gallo-Roman statue of a woman in a short belted tunic, riding a boar sidesaddle and holding a knife, conserved in the Musée des antiquités nationales, St-Germain-en-Laye, bears no inscription, and was simply assumed to be Arduinna by the 19th century antiquarian who discovered it—perhaps because the modern symbol of the Ardennes region is also a boar. Another such bronze, from the collection of Richard Payne Knight, has been in the British Museum since 1824; it is traditionally identified as "Diana". Both bronze statuettes are now headless.

== Inscriptions ==
Arduinna is directly attested from two inscriptions:

- Düren, Germany: deae Ardbinnae (CIL XIII, 07848; the object in question is an altar)
- Rome, Italy: Arduinne (CIL VI, 00046; this is an inscribed relief, on which the name Arduinne has also been read as Saturno)

== Etymology ==
The name Arduinna derives from the Gaulish arduo- meaning height. Also Latin: Ardua- steep. It is also found in several placenames, such as the Ardennes Woods (Arduenna silva) and the Forest of Arden in England, in personal names Arduunus and Arda — the latter from coinage of the Treveri — and the Galatian Αρδή. The name Arduenna silva for "wooded heights" was applied to several forested mountains, not just the modern Ardennes: it is found in the départements of Haute-Loire and Puy-de-Dôme and in the French commune of Alleuze.

It has also been suggested that the gemination -nn- is typical to a language of the Belgae, being different from Celtic and thus suggesting a Nordwestblock etymology, which, generally speaking, is also assumed to be closer to Germanic.

== Historical references ==
In 585, Walfroy (Wulfilaich) preached to the local population of Villers-devant-Orval in the Ardennes to persuade them to abandon the worship of Diana. On the hill near Margut, there was, according to Gregory of Tours, a large stone statue of Diana where people would worship. Worshippers would also sing chants in Diana's honour as they drank and feasted. After some difficulties, Walfroy and his followers succeeded in pulling down the statue, which they demolished with hammers.

== Legacy ==
The Main belt asteroid 394 Arduina, discovered on 19 November 1894, is named for Arduinna.

The French-Belgian television series Black Spot, set in the Ardennes, features a group of eco warriors named the Children of Arduinna (Les Enfants d'Arduinna).

== See also ==
- Cult of Artemis at Brauron
- Diana Nemorensis
- Potnia Theron
