= Alphonse Borrelly =

French astronomer

Alphonse Louis Nicolas Borrelly (December 8, 1842 – February 28, 1926) was a French astronomer born in Roquemaure, Gard.

He joined the Marseille Observatory in 1864. In the course of his career, he discovered a number of asteroids and comets, including the periodic comet 19P/Borrelly. He also discovered five NGC objects, all galaxies.

The French Academy of Sciences awarded him the Prix Valz for 1903 and the Prix Lalande for 1909. The asteroid 1539 Borrelly was named in his honor.

In 1913, he received the Prix Jules Janssen, the highest award of the Société astronomique de France, the French astronomical society.

== Discoveries ==
Asteroids discovered: 18
99 Dike	May 28, 1868
110 Lydia	April 19, 1870
117 Lomia	September 12, 1871
120 Lachesis	April 10, 1872
146 Lucina	June 8, 1875
157 Dejanira	December 1, 1875
171 Ophelia	January 13, 1877
172 Baucis	February 5, 1877
173 Ino	August 1, 1877
198 Ampella	June 13, 1879
233 Asterope	May 11, 1883
240 Vanadis	August 27, 1884
246 Asporina	March 6, 1885
268 Adorea	June 8, 1887
308 Polyxo	March 31, 1891
322 Phaeo	November 27, 1891
369 Aëria	July 4, 1893
394 Arduina	November 19, 1894

=== Comets discovered or co-discovered ===
The following is an incomplete list of comets discovered or co-discovered by Borrelly:

- C/1873 Q1 (Borrelly)
- C/1877 C1 (Borrelly)
- C/1877 G2 (Swift-Borrelly-Block)
- C/1889 X1 (Borrelly)
- C/1900 O1 (Borrelly–Brooks)
- 19P/Borrelly
- C/1909 L1 (Borrelly–Daniel)

NGC objects discovered (all in 1871)

- NGC 2268
- NGC 2300
- NGC 2715
- NGC 3933
- NGC 3934
