= 171 Ophelia =

Large main-belt asteroid

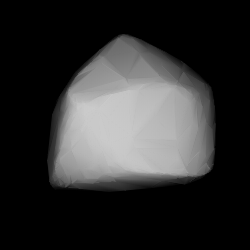
- 3D convex shape model of 171 Ophelia

Discovery
- Discovered by: A. Borrelly
- Discovery date: 13 January 1877

Designations
- Pronunciation: /oʊˈfiːliə/ oh-FEE-lee-ə
- Alternative designations: A877 AB
- Minor planet category: Main belt (Themis)
- Adjectives: Ophelian /ɒˈfiːliən/

Orbital characteristics
- Epoch 31 July 2016 (JD 2457600.5)
- Uncertainty parameter 0
- Observation arc: 122.15 yr (44615 d)
- Aphelion: 3.5476 AU (530.71 Gm)
- Perihelion: 2.7175 AU (406.53 Gm)
- Semi-major axis: 3.1326 AU (468.63 Gm)
- Eccentricity: 0.13249
- Orbital period (sidereal): 5.54 yr (2025.1 d)
- Mean anomaly: 11.164°
- Mean motion: 0° 10^{m} 39.972^{s} / day
- Inclination: 2.5461°
- Longitude of ascending node: 100.52°
- Argument of perihelion: 56.849°

Physical characteristics
- Mean diameter: 130.808±1.483 km
- Mass: (1.064 ± 0.535/0.351)×10^{18} kg (5.4±2.7)×10^{17} kg (Note: Calculated from its standard gravitational parameter GM = 0.036±0.018 km^{3}/s^{2}.)
- Mean density: 1.755 ± 0.883/0.579 g/cm^{3} (Note: Assuming a diameter of 105.01 ± 3.54 km.); 0.46 g/cm^{3}
- Synodic rotation period: 6.66535 h (0.277723 d)
- Geometric albedo: 0.0615±0.004
- Spectral type: C
- Absolute magnitude (H): 8.31

171 Ophelia is a large, dark Themistian asteroid that was discovered by French astronomer Alphonse Borrelly on 13 January 1877. It was named after Ophelia in Shakespeare's Hamlet. This object is orbiting the Sun at a distance of 3.13 AU with an eccentricity of 0.13 and an orbital period of 5.54 years. The orbital plane is inclined at an angle of 2.55° to the plane of the ecliptic.

This asteroid is a member of the Themis family of asteroids that share similar orbital elements. It probably has a primitive composition, similar to that of the carbonaceous chondrite meteorites. The body spans a diameter of 131 km. An analysis of 40 light curves in 2015 suggested it has a convex, elongated shape with one end smaller than the other.

A 1979 study of the Algol-like light curve produced by this asteroid concluded that it was possible to model the brightness variation by assuming a binary system with a circular orbit, a period of 13.146 hours, and an inclination of 15° to the line of sight from the Earth. Photometric observations of this asteroid at the Leura Observatory in Leura, Australia during 2006 gave a rotation period of 6.6666 ± 0.0002 hours and a brightness variation of 0.50 ± 0.02 in magnitude. This is in agreement with previous studies.

Ophelia is also the name of a moon of Uranus.
