= 394 Arduina =

Main-belt asteroid

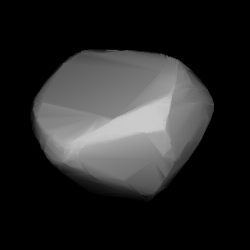
- Modelled shape of Arduina from its lightcurve

Discovery
- Discovered by: Alphonse Borrelly
- Discovery date: 19 November 1894

Designations
- Pronunciation: /ɑːrduˈiːnə/
- Named after: Arduinna
- Alternative designations: 1894 BH
- Minor planet category: Main belt

Orbital characteristics
- Epoch 31 July 2016 (JD 2457600.5)
- Uncertainty parameter 0
- Observation arc: 121.37 yr (44329 d)
- Aphelion: 3.39206 AU (507.445 Gm)
- Perihelion: 2.14064 AU (320.235 Gm)
- Semi-major axis: 2.76635 AU (413.840 Gm)
- Eccentricity: 0.22619
- Orbital period (sidereal): 4.60 yr (1680.6 d)
- Mean anomaly: 231.227°
- Mean motion: 0° 12^{m} 51.163^{s} / day
- Inclination: 6.21491°
- Longitude of ascending node: 66.9435°
- Argument of perihelion: 270.829°

Physical characteristics
- Dimensions: 31.32±1.8 km
- Synodic rotation period: 16.53 h (0.689 d)
- Geometric albedo: 0.2464±0.032
- Absolute magnitude (H): 9.66

394 Arduina (prov. designation: A894 WB or MPC-1894 BH) is an asteroid from the central regions of the asteroid belt. It was discovered by Alphonse Borrelly on 19 November 1894 in Marseille.
