= 268 Adorea =

Main-belt asteroid

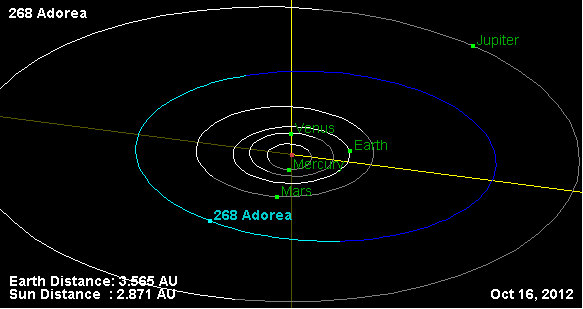
- Orbital diagram

Discovery
- Discovered by: Alphonse Borrelly
- Discovery date: 8 June 1887

Designations
- Pronunciation: /əˈdɔːriə/
- Named after: adorea liba (spelt cakes)
- Alternative designations: A887 LA
- Minor planet category: Main belt (Themis)
- Adjectives: Adorean /əˈdɔːriən/

Orbital characteristics
- Epoch 31 July 2016 (JD 2457600.5)
- Uncertainty parameter 0
- Observation arc: 39,920 d (109.3 yr)
- Aphelion: 3.515 AU (525.8 Gm)
- Perihelion: 2.668 AU (399.2 Gm)
- Semi-major axis: 3.092 AU (462.5 Gm)
- Eccentricity: 0.13689
- Orbital period (sidereal): 5.44 yr (1,985.5 d)
- Mean anomaly: 302.257°
- Mean motion: 0° 10^{m} 52.748^{s} / day
- Inclination: 2.44010°
- Longitude of ascending node: 120.914°
- Argument of perihelion: 69.5742°

Physical characteristics
- Mean diameter: 144.585±0.892 km 139.57±3.31 km
- Mass: (2.228 ± 0.919/0.718)×10^{18} kg (1.77±0.21)×10^{18} kg (Note: Calculated from its standard gravitational parameter GM = 0.118±0.014 km^{3}/s^{2}.)
- Mean density: 1.565 ± 0.645/0.505 g/cm^{3} 1.12 g/cm^{3} (Note: Assuming a diameter of 145 km.)
- Synodic rotation period: 7.80 h (0.325 d)
- Geometric albedo: 0.041±0.007
- Spectral type: FC
- Absolute magnitude (H): 8.67

268 Adorea is a very large main belt asteroid, about 140 km (87 mi) in width. It was discovered by Alphonse Borrelly on 8 June 1887 in Marseille. This asteroid is a member of the Themis family and is classified as a primitive carbonaceous F-type/C-type asteroid. It is orbiting the Sun at a distance of 3.09 AU with an orbital eccentricity (ovalness) of 0.14 and a period of 5.44 yr. The orbital plane is tilted at an angle of 2.44° to the plane of the ecliptic.

From 23 February until 2 March 2006, photometric measurements were taken of the asteroid. These were used to produce a light curve showing a rotation period of 7.80±0.02 h with a brightness variation of 0.16±0.03 in magnitude. This result is consistent with some, but not all previous results. Some studies had suggested a longer rotation period of 15.959 h; double the time measured. However, the new data is inconsistent with the longer period.

In May 1979, 268 Adorea was positioned in proximity of the galaxy NGC 4517 and as a bright new light source it was identified as a potential supernova. However, the light was missing from a second photographic plate taken ten days later, and the source was soon identified as the asteroid.

The name refers to adorea liba, the Latin name for spelt cakes produced from meal and salt offered by the Romans as a sacrifice; the name was controversial among astronomers, as all previous asteroids had been named for humans or mythological figures.
