= 33P/Daniel =

Periodic comet with 8 year orbit

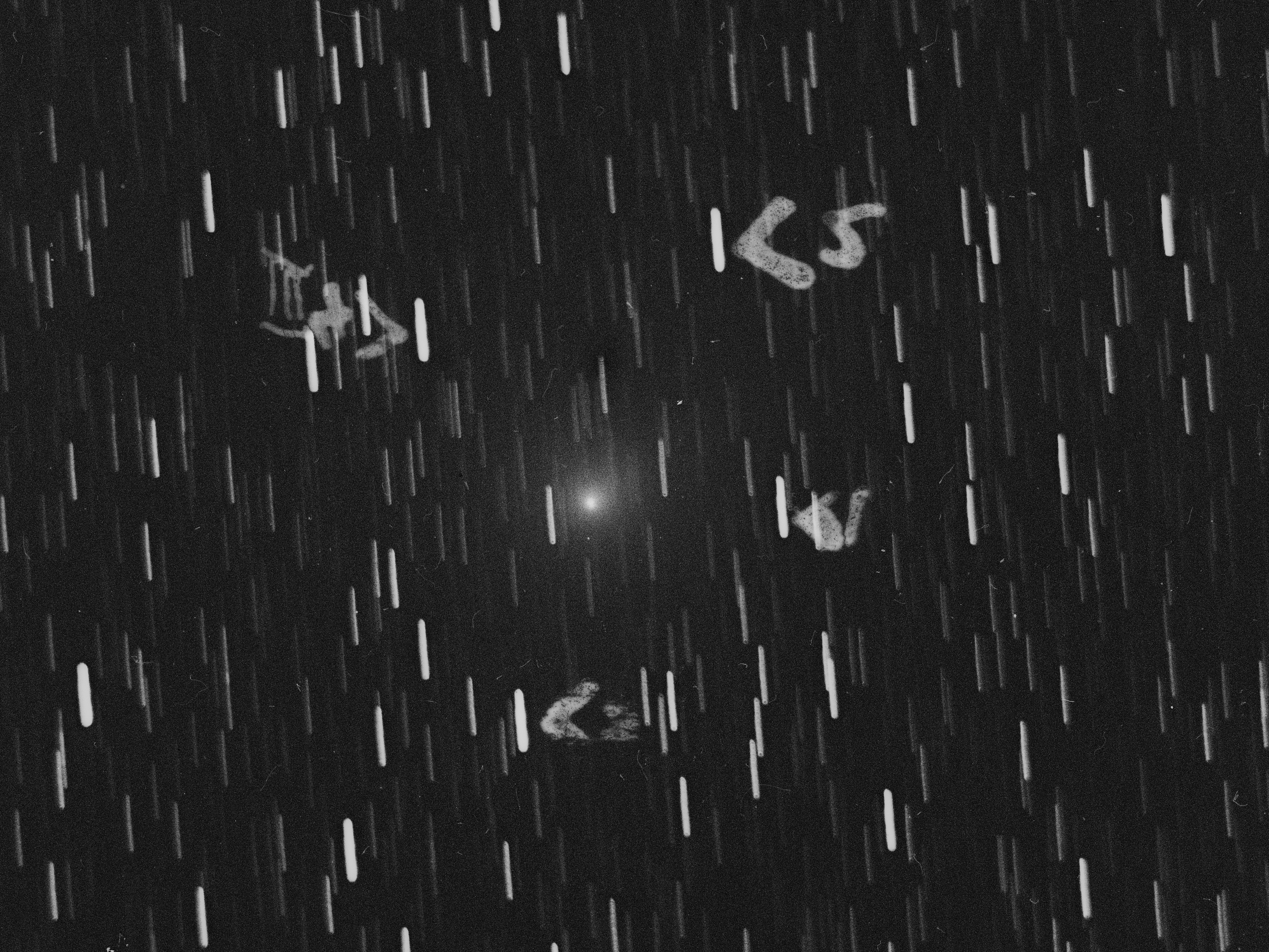
- Daniel's Comet photographed from the Heidelberg Observatory on 15 December 1909

Discovery
- Discovered by: Zaccheus Daniel
- Discovery site: Halsted Observatory
- Discovery date: 7 December 1909

Designations
- MPC designation: P/1909 X1, P/1937 B1
- Alternative designations: 1909 IV, 1937 I, 1943 IV; 1950 V, 1964 II, 1978 XII; 1985 XI, 1992 XXIII

Orbital characteristics
- Epoch: June 25, 2000
- Aphelion: 5.89 AU
- Perihelion: 2.157 AU
- Semi-major axis: 4.021 AU
- Eccentricity: 0.4635
- Orbital period: 8.065 a
- Inclination: 22.41°
- Last perihelion: 11 November 2024
- Next perihelion: 19 February 2033
- Jupiter MOID: 0.152 AU (22,700,000 km)

Physical characteristics
- Mean radius: 0.91 km (0.57 mi)
- Mean density: 580±90 kg/m^{3}

Perihelion distance at different epochs
Epoch	Perihelion (AU)
1903	1.38
1916	1.53
1964	1.66
2000	2.16
2041	2.25

Comet Daniel is a periodic comet in the Solar System discovered by Zaccheus Daniel (Halsted Observatory, Princeton University, New Jersey, United States) on December 7, 1909, estimated as magnitude 9.

Following its discovery, the returns for 1916, 1923, and 1930 were predicted but on each occasion, it was not recovered.

The 1937 return was recovered by Shin-ichi Shimizu (Simada, Japan) on January 31 after a calculation of the comet's orbit by Hidewo Hirose (Tokyo, Japan) after he took calculations for the 1923 return done by Alexander D. Dubiago and took into account perturbations from Jupiter.

Since then, all returns apart from 1957 and 1971 have been recovered.

Since its first discovery, this comet's orbital period has steadily increased due to repeated close encounters with Jupiter.

The comet nucleus is estimated to be 1.82 km (1.13 mi) in diameter.

At some point between 2009 January 11 and 30 the comet underwent an outburst of around 3 magnitudes, brightening from 18th to 15th magnitude.

Numbered comets
Previous; 32P/Comas Solá	33P/Daniel	Next; 34D/Gale
