= 369 Aëria =

Main-belt asteroid

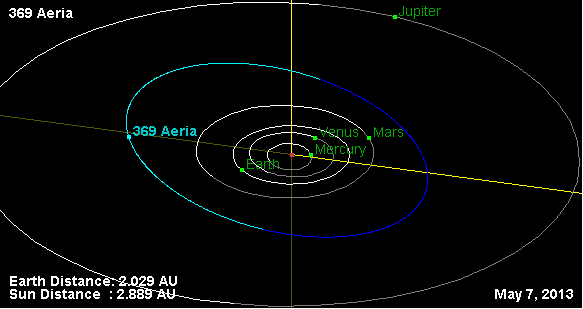
- Orbital diagram

Discovery
- Discovered by: A. Borrelly
- Discovery site: Marseille Obs.
- Discovery date: 4 July 1893

Designations
- Pronunciation: /eɪˈɪəriə/
- Named after: Air (classical element)
- Alternative designations: 1893 AE · 1949 MY; A894 WA
- Minor planet category: main-belt · middle Aeria

Orbital characteristics
- Epoch 4 September 2017 (JD 2458000.5)
- Uncertainty parameter 0
- Observation arc: 123.99 yr (45,288 days)
- Aphelion: 2.9068 AU
- Perihelion: 2.3952 AU
- Semi-major axis: 2.6510 AU
- Eccentricity: 0.0965
- Orbital period (sidereal): 4.32 yr (1,577 days)
- Mean anomaly: 205.45°
- Mean motion: 0° 13^{m} 41.88^{s} / day
- Inclination: 12.706°
- Longitude of ascending node: 94.209°
- Argument of perihelion: 268.82°

Physical characteristics
- Mean diameter: 60.00±1.2 km 65.39±0.72 km 70.798±2.087 km 73.767±1.072 km
- Mass: (4.88 ± 2.78/1.15)×10^{17} kg
- Mean density: 3.43 ± 1.951/0.809 g/cm^{3} (Note: Assuming a diameter of 64.78 ± 1.98 km.)
- Synodic rotation period: 4.774±0.001 h 4.7776±0.0002 h 4.7780±0.0005 h 4.787 h 4.82 h 14 h (poor)
- Geometric albedo: 0.127±0.018; 0.1378±0.0234; 0.163±0.004; 0.1919±0.008
- Spectral type: Tholen = M · M B–V = 0.711; U–B = 0.274
- Absolute magnitude (H): 8.52; 8.78±0.77; 8.65

369 Aëria provisional designation 1893 AE, is a metallic asteroid and the parent body of the Aeria family. It orbits in the central region of the asteroid belt, rotates every 4.778 hours and measures approximately 65 kilometers in diameter. The asteroid was discovered on 4 July 1893, by French astronomer Alphonse Borrelly at the Marseille Observatory in southeastern France. It was named for "Air", one of the four classical elements: earth, water, air and fire.

== Orbit and classification ==
Aëria is the parent body of the Aeria family (539), a small asteroid family of less than 300 known members, while the Lightcurve Data Base dynamically groups it to the much larger Eunomia family (502). Named members of the Aeria family include 1184 Gaea, 3324 Avsyuk, 130066 Timhaltigin and 144303 Mirellabreschi.

Aëria orbits the Sun in the central main-belt at a distance of 2.4–2.9 AU once every 4 years and 4 months (1,577 days). Its orbit has an eccentricity of 0.10 and an inclination of 13° with respect to the ecliptic. The body's observation arc begins at Marseille on 6 July 1893, two nights after its official discovery observation.

== Physical characteristics ==
In the Tholen classification, Aëria is a metallic M-type asteroid. This agrees with the more generic X-type, assigned to members of the Aeria family.

=== Rotation period ===
Several rotational lightcurves of Aëria have been obtained from photometric observations since 1984, when it was first observed at ESO's La Silla Observatory in Chile. Lightcurve analysis gave a consolidated rotation period of 4.778 hours with a brightness amplitude between 0.04 and 0.13 magnitude (U=2/2/3/2/1).

=== Diameter and albedo ===
According to the surveys carried out by the Infrared Astronomical Satellite IRAS, the Japanese Akari satellite and the NEOWISE mission of NASA's Wide-field Infrared Survey Explorer, Aëria measures between 60.00 and 73.77 kilometers in diameter and its surface has an albedo between 0.127 and 0.1919.

The Collaborative Asteroid Lightcurve Link adopts the results obtained by IRAS, that is, an albedo of 0.1919 and a diameter of 60.0 kilometers based on an absolute magnitude of 8.52.

=== Occultation events ===
Aëria has been observed by astronomers during at least two occultation events: the first in December 2015 and the other in February 2018. These provided information on the size and shape of the asteroid.

== Naming ==
This minor planet was named after "Air", one of the four classical elements: earth, water, air and fire. It is thought that the asteroid's name may have also been inspired by the two letters of its provisional designation, 1893 AE.
