= NGC 3934 =

Galaxy in the constellation Leo

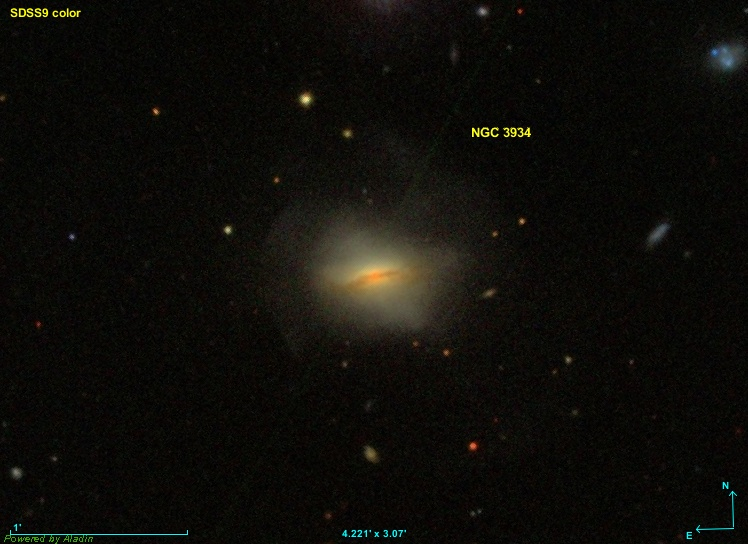
- SDSS image of NGC 3934

Observation data (J2000 epoch)
- Constellation: Leo
- Right ascension: 11^{h} 52^{m} 12.55^{s}
- Declination: +16° 51′ 05.29″
- Redshift: 0.012605
- Heliocentric radial velocity: 3779 ± 4 km/s
- Distance: 179.0 ± 12.5 Mly (54.89 ± 3.84 Mpc)
- Apparent magnitude (V): 14.0

Characteristics
- Type: S0/a
- Size: ~79,000 ly (24.1 kpc) (estimated)

Other designations
- UGC 6841, ECO 03134, CGCG 097-171, PGC 37170, SFRS 057, MCG +03-30-123

NGC 3934 is a spiral galaxy located in the constellation Leo. The redshift of the galaxy is (z) 0.012 and it was discovered by the French astronomer Alphonse Borrelly at an unknown date in 1871, who found it has a magnitude of 13. This object has also been classified as a possible polar ring galaxy and also a shell galaxy. It is a member of a compact group of galaxies, of which NGC 3933 is also a part of.

== Description ==
NGC 3934 is a peculiar disk galaxy. It contains evidence of a central dust lane shown as obscuring both inner and outer regions in an irregular pattern. There are also shell features in the inner and outer regions of the galaxy, suggesting it is the result of a wet galaxy merger. A study also detected near ultraviolet emission knots located within the ripple feature on the northwest side of the galaxy, supporting this merger theory. Despite the classification of it being a polar ring galaxy, there is no evidence of an inclined ring feature or any polar ring structures. The total star formation of the galaxy has been estimated as 4.6 M_{☉} per year. It is gas rich, with an estimated mass of around 5 × 10^{9} M_{☉}.

An X-shaped structure has been detected in NGC 3934. There is also evidence the galaxy contains molecular gas. When observed, the gas motions are incredibly complex with at least two velocity peaks at 3450 and 3800 kilometers per second, and each located on the dark ring feature and stellar body major axis of the galaxy. There are possible traces of H I emission located in a region that extends downwards to 3400 kilometers per seconds.
