= Zaccheus Daniel =

American astronomer (1874–1964)

- Born: 1874
- Died: June 30, 1964 (aged 89 or 90); Pittsburgh, Pennsylvania, U.S.
- Occupation: Astronomer
- Known for: C/1907 L2 (Daniel), Comet Daniel

Zaccheus Daniel (1874 - March 30, 1964) was an American astronomer known for the discovery of numerous comets.

== Education ==
Daniel pursued his degree at Princeton University starting in 1903. It was at Princeton's Halmsted Observatory on December 7, 1909, that he identified 33P. By this point, Daniel had already discovered two comets — C/1907 L2 (Daniel) and C/1909 L1 (Borrelly–Daniel) — which he discovered in June 1907 and June 1909 respectively. Starting in 1910, he began work at the Allegheny Observatory at the University of Pittsburgh. Daniel died on June 30, 1964.

== Awards and honors ==
In March 1910, Daniel was awarded the sixty-eighth Donohoe Comet Medal by the Astronomical Society of the Pacific.

The University of Pittsburgh maintains a fellowship program in Daniel's honor, accepting multiple students each year.

== See also ==
- 33P/Daniel
- C/1907 L2 (Daniel)
