= 34D/Gale =

Lost comet

Discovery
- Discovered by: Walter Frederick Gale
- Discovery date: June 7, 1927

Designations
- Alternative designations: 1927 L1, 1938 L1

Orbital characteristics
- Epoch: July 1, 1938
- Observation arc: Not observed in 88 years
- Number of observations: 47
- Aphelion: 8.7 AU
- Perihelion: 1.18 AU
- Semi-major axis: 4.94 AU
- Eccentricity: 0.76
- Orbital period: 10.99 a
- Inclination: 11.72 °
- Next perihelion: 25 August 2026? (Horizons); 18 November 2026? (Kinoshita)

Comet Gale is a periodic comet in the Solar System discovered by Walter Frederick Gale (Sydney, Australia) on June 7, 1927. It has not been observed in 88 years.

The second apparition was calculated for 1938, but Gale failed to find it; however, it was recalculated by Leland E. Cunningham who later recovered it for that year.

The 1949 apparition was never detected, and due to unfavourable conditions ever since it has never been recovered and it remains a lost comet.

For the 2026 perihelion passage, estimates vary by a difference of 85 days (from 25 August 2026 to 18 November 2026). 34D/Gale is part of the Unistellar citizen science tracking project in an effort to recover a surviving fragment in outburst.

Numbered comets
Previous; 33P/Daniel	34D/Gale	Next; 35P/Herschel–Rigollet
