= 99 Dike =

Main-belt asteroid

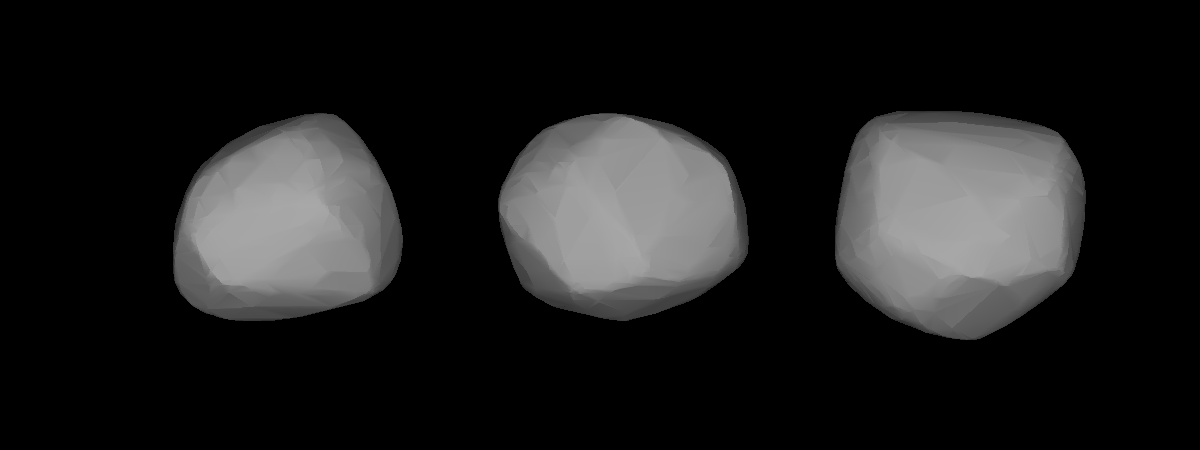
- Three-dimensional model of 99 Dike created based on its lightcurve

Discovery
- Discovered by: Alphonse Borrelly
- Discovery date: 28 May 1868

Designations
- Pronunciation: /ˈdaɪkiː/
- Named after: Dike
- Alternative designations: A915 BA; 1935 UC; 1935 YL; 1939 UT; 1948 UE; 1948 WC; 1961 XJ; 1974 VB
- Minor planet category: Main belt
- Adjectives: Dikean /daɪˈkiːən/

Orbital characteristics
- Epoch 31 July 2016 (JD 2457600.5)
- Uncertainty parameter 0
- Observation arc: 101.25 yr (36980 d)
- Aphelion: 3.18448 AU (476.391 Gm)
- Perihelion: 2.14561 AU (320.979 Gm)
- Semi-major axis: 2.66504 AU (398.684 Gm)
- Eccentricity: 0.19491
- Orbital period (sidereal): 4.35 yr (1589.1 d)
- Average orbital speed: 18.07 km/s
- Mean anomaly: 18.1950°
- Mean motion: 0° 13^{m} 35.551^{s} / day
- Inclination: 13.8487°
- Longitude of ascending node: 41.5307°
- Argument of perihelion: 195.413°
- Earth MOID: 1.13747 AU (170.163 Gm)
- Jupiter MOID: 1.82393 AU (272.856 Gm)
- T_{Jupiter}: 3.316

Physical characteristics
- Dimensions: 69.04±2.7 km
- Mass: ~3.9×10^{17} kg
- Mean density: 2.0? g/cm^{3}
- Equatorial surface gravity: ~0.0201 m/s^{2}
- Equatorial escape velocity: ~0.0380 km/s
- Synodic rotation period: 18.127 h (0.7553 d)
- Geometric albedo: 0.0627±0.005; 0.058
- Temperature: ~172 K
- Spectral type: C (Tholen); Xk (Bus)
- Absolute magnitude (H): 9.43

99 Dike (/ˈdaɪkiː/) is a quite large and dark main-belt asteroid. Dike was discovered by Alphonse Borrelly on May 28, 1868. It was his first asteroid discovery. This object is named after Dike, the Greek goddess of moral justice. Among the first hundred numbered minor planets, 99 Dike was considered anomalously faint for over a century. However, this was later found to be untrue.

This asteroid is orbiting the Sun with a period of 4.35 years and an eccentricity of 0.19. Its orbital plane is inclined by 13.8° to the plane of the ecliptic. The body spans a diameter of 69 km and it is classified as a C-type asteroid, which indicates it has a dark, carbonaceous surface. Based upon a light curve that was generated from photometric observations of this asteroid at Pulkovo Observatory, it has a rotation period of 18.127 ± 0.002 hours and varies in brightness by 0.22 ± 0.02 in magnitude. However, according to Shrindan E. (2009) the rotation period is rather of 10.360 ± 0.001 h.

The asteroid is located near the Juno clump of asteroids, but is most likely unrelated.
