= T-type asteroid =

Type of asteroid

T-type asteroids are rare inner-belt asteroids of unknown composition with dark, featureless and moderately red spectra, and a moderate absorption feature shortwards of 0.85 μm. No direct meteorite analog has been found to date. Thought to be anhydrous, they are considered to be related to P-types or D-types, or possibly a highly altered C-type.

Examples of T-type asteroids include 96 Aegle, 114 Kassandra, 233 Asterope, and 308 Polyxo. The infrared spectrum of the first three are similar to the mineral troilite, while 308 Polyxo is modified with hydration features.

In 2010, the asteroid 596 Scheila was impacted by a projectile. The impact changed its spectrum from T-type to D-type, likely by exposing fresh material that was not weathered.

== See also ==
- Asteroid spectral types
