= 363 Padua =

Main-belt asteroid

Discovery
- Discovered by: Auguste Charlois
- Discovery date: 17 March 1893

Designations
- Pronunciation: /ˈpædjuə/
- Named after: Padua
- Alternative designations: 1893 S
- Minor planet category: Main belt (Lydia)

Orbital characteristics
- Epoch 31 July 2016 (JD 2457600.5)
- Uncertainty parameter 0
- Observation arc: 121.80 yr (44489 d)
- Aphelion: 2.94211 AU (440.133 Gm)
- Perihelion: 2.55710 AU (382.537 Gm)
- Semi-major axis: 2.74960 AU (411.334 Gm)
- Eccentricity: 0.070012
- Orbital period (sidereal): 4.56 yr (1665.3 d)
- Mean anomaly: 193.817°
- Mean motion: 0° 12^{m} 58.219^{s} / day
- Inclination: 5.94381°
- Longitude of ascending node: 64.7678°
- Argument of perihelion: 295.490°

Physical characteristics
- Dimensions: 97 km
- Mass: (7.8±1.2)×10^{17} kg (Note: Calculated from its standard gravitational parameter GM = 0.052±0.008 km^{3}/s^{2}.)
- Mean density: 1.62 g/cm^{3}
- Synodic rotation period: 8.401 h (0.3500 d)
- Absolute magnitude (H): 9.01, 8.88

363 Padua is a main belt asteroid that was discovered by Auguste Charlois on 17 March 1893 in Nice. It was named after the city of Padua (Padova), Italy.

Richard P. Binzel and Schelte Bus further added to the knowledge about this asteroid in a lightwave survey published in 2003. This project was known as Small Main-belt Asteroid Spectroscopic Survey, Phase II or SMASSII, which built on a previous survey of the main-belt asteroids. The visible-wavelength (0.435-0.925 micrometre) spectra data was gathered between August 1993 and March 1999.

Lightcurve data has also been recorded by observers at the Antelope Hill Observatory, which has been designated as an official observatory by the Minor Planet Center.

It gives its name to the Padua family, a group of asteroids with similar orbital properties.
