= 157 Dejanira =

Main-belt asteroid

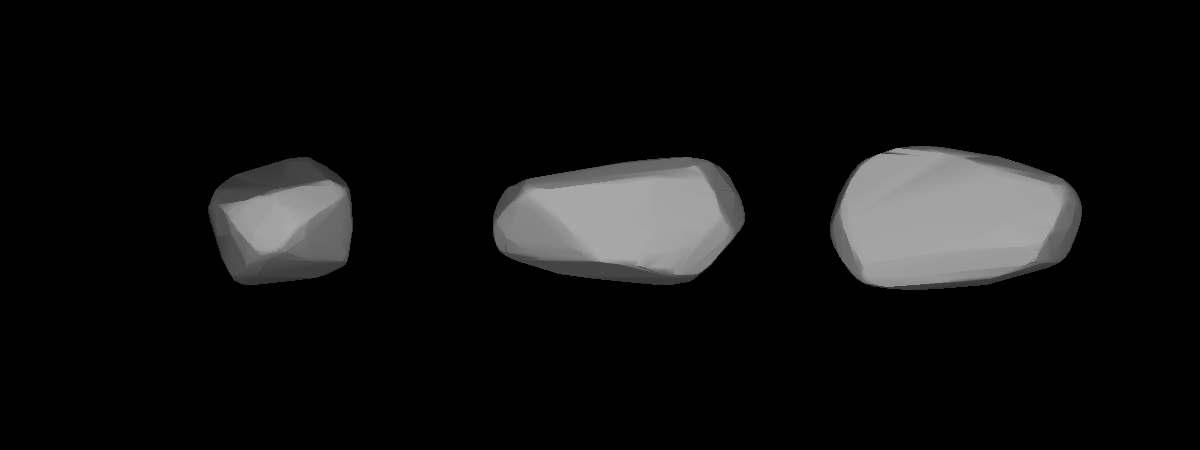
- A three-dimensional model of 157 Dejanira based on its lightcurve

Discovery
- Discovered by: A. Borrelly
- Discovery date: 1 December 1875

Designations
- Pronunciation: /dɛdʒəˈnaɪərə/
- Alternative designations: A875 XA; 1904 VB; 1978 TS_{1}
- Minor planet category: Main belt

Orbital characteristics
- Epoch 31 July 2016 (JD 2457600.5)
- Uncertainty parameter 0
- Observation arc: 111.13 yr (40590 d)
- Aphelion: 3.0852 AU (461.54 Gm)
- Perihelion: 2.07801 AU (310.866 Gm)
- Semi-major axis: 2.58161 AU (386.203 Gm)
- Eccentricity: 0.19507
- Orbital period (sidereal): 4.15 yr (1515.1 d)
- Average orbital speed: 18.36 km/s
- Mean anomaly: 312.135°
- Mean motion: 0° 14^{m} 15.396^{s} / day
- Inclination: 12.160°
- Longitude of ascending node: 62.070°
- Argument of perihelion: 46.282°
- Earth MOID: 1.11241 AU (166.414 Gm)
- Jupiter MOID: 2.16656 AU (324.113 Gm)
- T_{Jupiter}: 3.366

Physical characteristics
- Dimensions: 19.1 km
- Mass: 7.3×10^{15} kg
- Mean density: 2.0 g/cm^{3}
- Equatorial surface gravity: 0.0053 m/s²
- Equatorial escape velocity: 0.0101 km/s
- Synodic rotation period: 15.825 h (0.6594 d)
- Geometric albedo: 0.10
- Temperature: ~173 K
- Absolute magnitude (H): 11.2

157 Dejanira is a main belt asteroid that was discovered by Alphonse Borrelly on 1 December 1875, and named after the warlike princess Deianira in Greek mythology (Δηιάνειρα in Greek). The Dejanira family of asteroids is named after it.

Photometric observations of this asteroid were made in early 2009 at the Organ Mesa Observatory in Las Cruces, New Mexico. The resulting light curve shows a synodic rotation period of 15.825 ± 0.001 hours.
