= 233 Asterope =

Asteroid

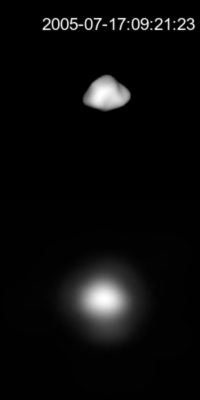
- Lightcurve-based 3D-model of Asterope on the top with an image of the asteroid on the bottom

Discovery
- Discovered by: A. Borrelly
- Discovery site: Marseille Obs.
- Discovery date: 11 May 1883

Designations
- Pronunciation: /əˈstɛrəpiː/
- Named after: Sterope
- Alternative designations: A883 JA
- Minor planet category: Main belt

Orbital characteristics
- Epoch 31 July 2016 (JD 2457600.5)
- Uncertainty parameter 0
- Observation arc: 118.65 yr (43337 d)
- Aphelion: 2.9271 AU (437.89 Gm)
- Perihelion: 2.3927 AU (357.94 Gm)
- Semi-major axis: 2.6599 AU (397.92 Gm)
- Eccentricity: 0.10044
- Orbital period (sidereal): 4.34 yr (1584.5 d)
- Mean anomaly: 138.789°
- Mean motion: 0° 13^{m} 37.92^{s} / day
- Inclination: 7.6832°
- Longitude of ascending node: 222.017°
- Argument of perihelion: 125.128°

Physical characteristics
- Mean diameter: 106±3 km
- Mass: (1.47±0.21)×10^{18} kg (Note: Calculated from its standard gravitational parameter GM = 0.098±0.014 km^{3}/s^{2}.)
- Mean density: 2.36±0.39 g/cm^{3}
- Synodic rotation period: 19.69803 h (0.820751 d)
- Pole ecliptic longitude: 316° ± 8°
- Pole ecliptic latitude: 58° ± 3°
- Geometric albedo: 0.0870±0.015
- Spectral type: Tholen = T SMASS = K
- Absolute magnitude (H): 8.21

233 Asterope is a large main-belt asteroid that was discovered on 11 May 1883, by French astronomer Alphonse Borrelly at Marseille Observatory in Marseille, France. The asteroid was named after Asterope (or Sterope), one of the Pleiades.

This asteroid is orbiting the Sun with a semimajor axis of 2.66 AU, a period of 4.34 years, and an eccentricity of 0.10. The orbital plane is inclined by 7.68° to the plane of the ecliptic. It is a rare T-type asteroid and has a relatively dark surface. The spectrum of 233 Asterope bears a resemblance to Troilite, a sulfurous iron mineral found in most iron meteorites.

Photometric observations during 1995 show a rotation period of 19.743 hours. Measurements made with the IRAS observatory give a diameter of 109.56 ± 5.04 km and a geometric albedo of 0.08 ± 0.01. By comparison, the MIPS photometer on the Spitzer Space Telescope gives a diameter of 97.54 ± 10.32 km and a geometric albedo of 0.10 ± 0.01.
