= 172 Baucis =

Asteroid

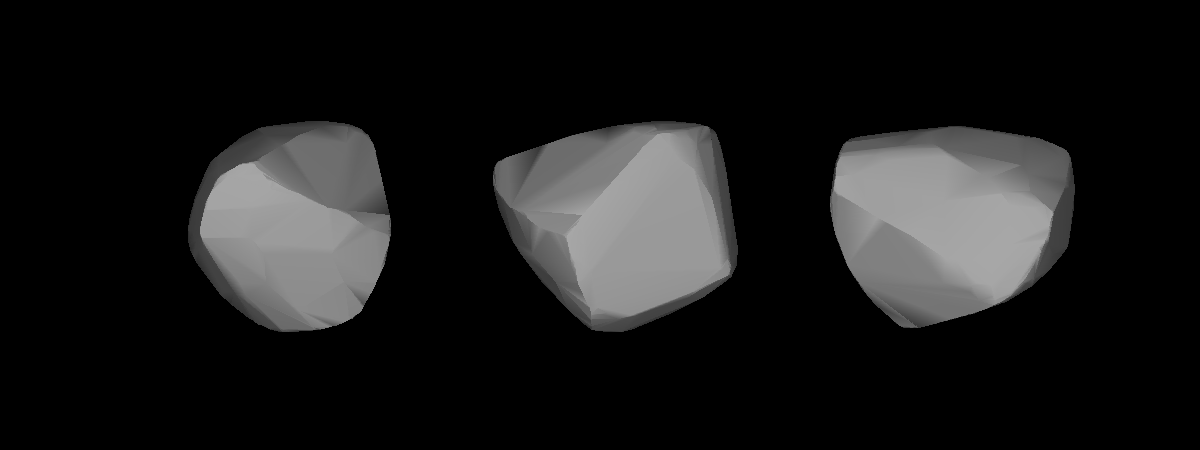
- Lightcurve-based 3D model of 172 Baucis

Discovery
- Discovered by: A. Borrelly
- Discovery date: 5 February 1877

Designations
- Pronunciation: /ˈbɔːsɪs/
- Named after: Baucis
- Alternative designations: A877 CA; 1921 EE
- Minor planet category: Main belt
- Adjectives: Baucidian

Orbital characteristics
- Epoch 31 July 2016 (JD 2457600.5)
- Uncertainty parameter 0
- Observation arc: 133.62 yr (48806 d)
- Aphelion: 2.6525 AU (396.81 Gm)
- Perihelion: 2.1073 AU (315.25 Gm)
- Semi-major axis: 2.3799 AU (356.03 Gm)
- Eccentricity: 0.11454
- Orbital period (sidereal): 3.67 yr (1341.0 d)
- Mean anomaly: 175.49°
- Mean motion: 0° 16^{m} 6.42^{s} / day
- Inclination: 10.028°
- Longitude of ascending node: 331.98°
- Argument of perihelion: 359.20°
- Earth MOID: 1.09593 AU (163.949 Gm)
- Jupiter MOID: 2.67257 AU (399.811 Gm)
- T_{Jupiter}: 3.510

Physical characteristics
- Mean radius: 31.215±0.6 km
- Synodic rotation period: 27.417 h (1.1424 d)
- Geometric albedo: 0.1382±0.006
- Spectral type: S
- Absolute magnitude (H): 8.79

172 Baucis is a large main belt asteroid that was discovered by French astronomer Alphonse Borrelly on February 5, 1877. It was named after a fictional character in the Greek legend of Baucis and Philemon. The adjectival form of the name is Baucidian.

This object is orbiting the Sun at a distance of 2.38 AU with an eccentricity of 0.11 and an orbital period of 3.67 years. The orbital plane is inclined at an angle of 10° to the plane of the ecliptic. Based on infrared measurements, it has a diameter of 62.43 km. It is classified as an S-type asteroid based upon its spectrum.

Photometric observations of this asteroid from the southern hemisphere during 2003 gave a light curve that indicated a slow synodic rotation period of 27.417 ± 0.013 hours and a brightness variation of 0.25 in magnitude.

Polarimetric study of this asteroid reveals anomalous properties that suggests the regolith consists of a mixture of low and high albedo material. This may have been caused by fragmentation of an asteroid substrate with the spectral properties of CO3/CV3 carbonaceous chondrites.
