= NGC 2715 =

Galaxy in the constellation Camelopardalis

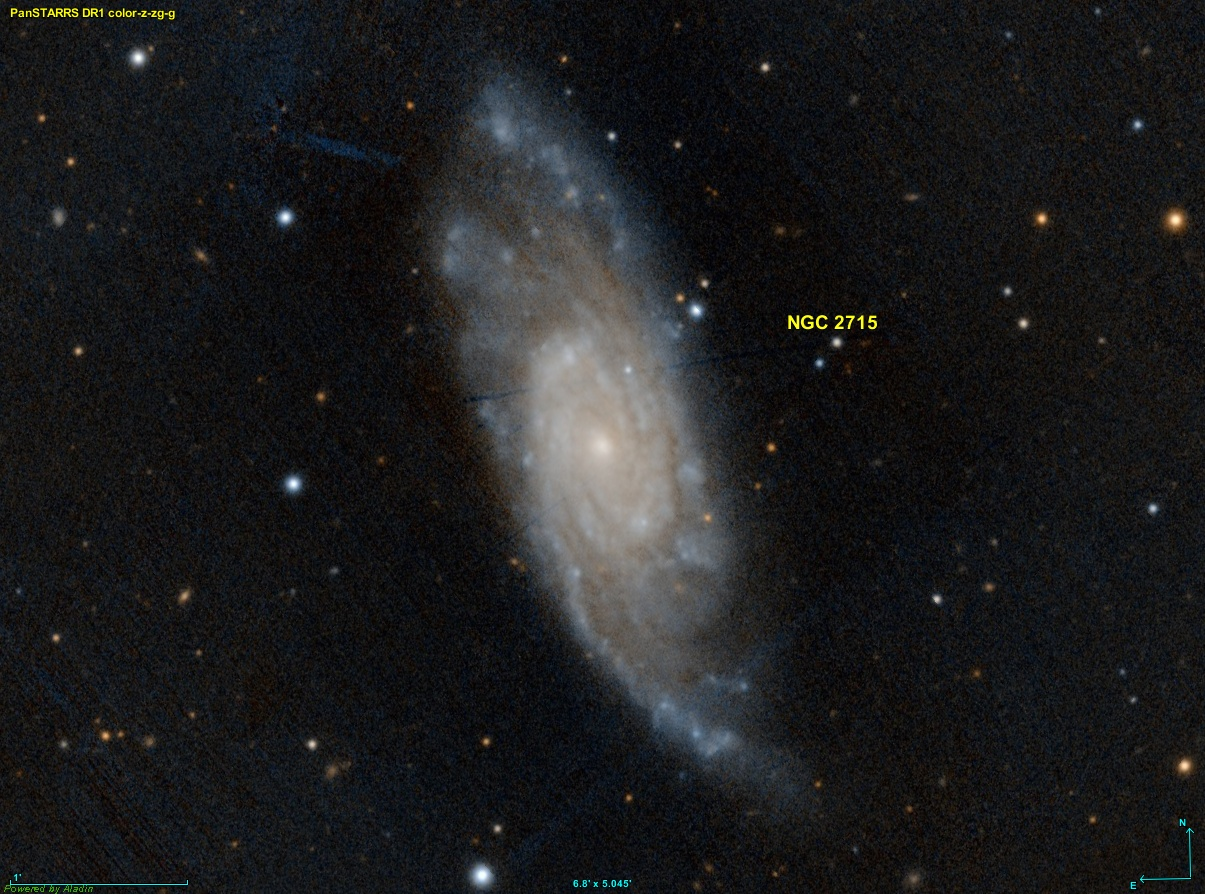
- Pan-STARRS image of NGC 2715

Observation data (J2000 epoch)
- Constellation: Camelopardalis
- Right ascension: 09^{h} 08^{m} 06.196^{s}
- Declination: +78° 05′ 06.57″
- Redshift: 0.004466
- Heliocentric radial velocity: 1339 km/s
- Distance: 67.35 ± 10.92 Mly (20.650 ± 3.347 Mpc)
- Group or cluster: NGC 2715 group (LGG 165)
- Apparent magnitude (V): 11.56
- Apparent magnitude (B): 11.79

Characteristics
- Type: SAB(rs)c
- Size: 98,000 ly (30,100 pc) (Note: RC3 D_{0} (blue) values used.)
- Apparent size (V): 4.9′ × 1.7′

Other designations
- IRAS 09018+7817, UGC 4759, PGC 25676, CGCG 350-012

NGC 2715 is an intermediate spiral galaxy in the constellation Camelopardalis. It was discovered in 1871 by Alphonse Borrelly. It is an intermediate spiral galaxy that is 4.9 arcminutes wide.

== NGC 2655 group ==
NGC 2715 is part of the NGC 2655 group (also known as LGG 165). Other galaxies in this group are NGC 2591, NGC 2748, UGC 4466, UGC 4701, and UGC 4714.

== Supernova ==
One supernova has been observed in NGC 2175:

- SN 1987M (Type Ib, mag. 15) was discovered by Miklós Lovas on 21 September 1987.

== See also ==
- List of NGC objects (2001–3000)
