= 308 Polyxo =

Main-belt asteroid

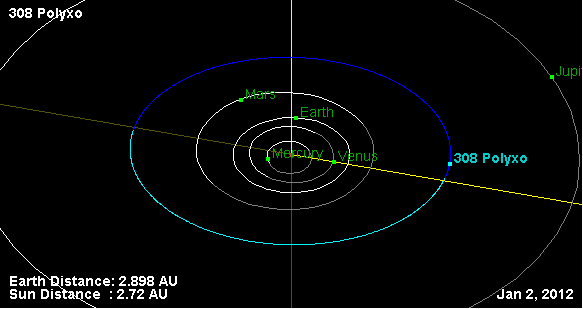
- Orbital diagram

Discovery
- Discovered by: Alphonse Borrelly
- Discovery date: 31 March 1891

Designations
- Pronunciation: /pəˈlɪksoʊ/
- Named after: Πολυξώ Polyxō
- Minor planet category: Main belt
- Adjectives: Polyxoian /pɒlɪkˈsoʊiən/

Orbital characteristics
- Epoch 31 July 2016 (JD 2457600.5)
- Uncertainty parameter 0
- Observation arc: 124.63 yr (45,521 d)
- Aphelion: 2.860 AU (427.8 Gm)
- Perihelion: 2.640 AU (394.9 Gm)
- Semi-major axis: 2.750 AU (411.4 Gm)
- Eccentricity: 0.040003
- Orbital period (sidereal): 4.56 yr (1,665.5 d)
- Mean anomaly: 70.4189°
- Mean motion: 0° 12^{m} 58.158^{s} / day
- Inclination: 4.36141°
- Longitude of ascending node: 181.727°
- Argument of perihelion: 115.501°

Physical characteristics
- Mean diameter: 125.4–133.5 km (LCI + occ); 139 km (thermophysical); 130 km (imaging)
- Mass: (2.50±0.16)×10^{18} kg (2025) (Note: Calculated from its standard gravitational parameter GM = 0.167±0.011 km^{3}/s^{2}.) (3.05±0.26)×10^{18} kg (2023)
- Mean density: 2.25 g/cm^{3} (2025) (Note: Assuming a diameter of 129 km.); 2.74±0.25 g/cm^{3} (2023) (Note: Assuming a diameter of 128.6 ± 1.6 km.)
- Synodic rotation period: 12.029587+0.000006 −0.000007 h
- Pole ecliptic longitude: 115°±2° or 295°+1° −2°
- Pole ecliptic latitude: 26°+5° −2° or 39°+4° −2°
- Geometric albedo: 0.043±0.002
- Spectral type: T (Tholen)
- Absolute magnitude (H): 8.17

308 Polyxo is a main-belt asteroid that was discovered by Alphonse Borrelly on 31 March 1891, in Marseille. It is orbiting the Sun at a distance of 2.75 AU with a low orbital eccentricity (ovalness) of 0.04 and a period of 4.56 yr. The orbital plane is tilted at an angle of 4.36° to the plane of the ecliptic.

308 Polyxo is classified as a rare T-type asteroid, with a spectrum that bears some similarity to the Tagish Lake meteorite. A spectral feature at a wavelength of 3.0 μm suggests aqueous alteration of some surface materials. Photometric measurements reported in 1983 give a rotation period of 12.03 hours and a brightness variation of 0.20 in magnitude. The adaptive optics instrument at the W. M. Keck Observatory shows an oblate object with a diameter of 130 km. The size ratio between the major and minor axes is 1.26 ± 0.11. Light curves for this object suggests it has a very irregular shape.

Stellar occultation events were observed for this asteroid during 2000 and 2004. The resulting chords provided cross-section diameter estimates of 144.4 and 117.1 km, respectively.
