= Leland Cunningham =

American astronomer

Minor planets discovered: 4
2211 Hanuman	November 26, 1951	list
6939 Lestone	September 22, 1952	list
(46512) 1951 QD	August 31, 1951	list
(99948) 1952 SU_{1}	September 23, 1952	list

Leland Erskin Cunningham (February 10, 1904, in Wiscasset, Maine – May 31, 1989, in Richmond, California) was an American astronomer and discoverer of minor planets. In a career spanning 50 years, he became an authority on orbit theory and on precise measurements of the orbits of comets, planets, satellites, and space probes. He was also an early authority on electronic digital computers and assisted in their construction and use in orbit calculations.

== Professional career ==
Cunningham began his career as an assistant to astronomer Fred Whipple at Harvard University. In this capacity, he became a driving force in using automated calculating methods for computing celestial orbits.

During World War II, Cunningham joined the Ballistics Research Laboratory (BRL) at Aberdeen Proving Ground in Aberdeen, Maryland, putting his expertise in number crunching toward the war effort. The computational needs of the BRL revolved around the compilation of artillery firing tables and bombing tables and employed a number of methods, human, analog, and digital; the backlog of computation jobs was so overwhelming that a satellite computation center was opened at the University of Pennsylvania's Moore School of Electrical Engineering in Philadelphia, and improved methods of automated computation were sought. Cunningham was present at the June 1943 meeting at which J. Presper Eckert, John Mauchly, and Lt. Herman Goldstine proposed the construction of the ENIAC; the program was agreed upon the same day. Initial plans for the machine called for it to have a precision of 5 decimal digits, but Cunningham's input compelled the inventors to design it with a precision of 10 decimal digits.

From 1945 to 1946, Cunningham served on the BRL's Computations Committee at Aberdeen Proving Grounds in Maryland, a group established as part of the Ballistics Research Laboratory to prepare the ENIAC for utilization following its completion the Moore School; the other Computations Committee members were Haskell Curry, Derrick Henry Lehmer, and Franz Alt. His duties included supervision of the laboratory's shop of IBM punched card calculating equipment, which was busy calculating ballistics trajectories, and writing sample problem specifications for benchmarking the ENIAC.

In 1946, Cunningham followed Lehmer to Berkeley where the latter was a professor, joining the Department of Astronomy at the University of California, Berkeley (a department that had 10 members in 1964–1965), and at one point serving as the department's chair. With Lehmer, Cunningham planned the construction of the California Digital Computer (CALDIC).

Working with the Leuschner Observatory in the 1950s and 1960s, Cunningham performed and published calculations of the orbits of comets. In particular, he showed that Comet Pereyra and Comet Ikeya–Seki were sungrazers similar to comets seen in 1668, 1843, 1880, and 1882.

== Death and honors ==
Cunningham died on May 31, 1989, at the age of 85. The comet C/1940 R2 is named Cunningham's comet. The minor planet 1754 Cunningham was named in his honor.

== See also ==
- List of minor planet discoverers § L. E. Cunningham
