= Ellen Harding Baker =

American astronomer and teacher (1847–1886)

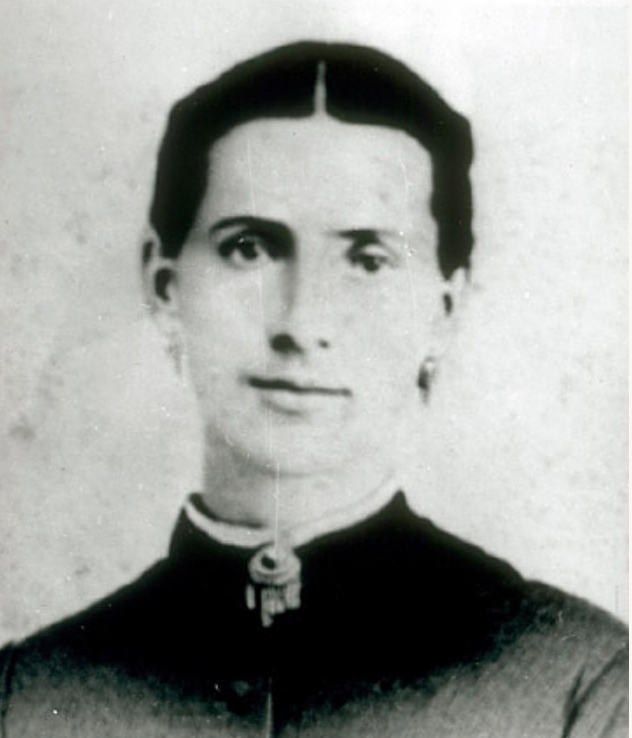
- Ellen Harding Baker
- Born: Sarah Ellen Harding; June 8, 1847
- Died: March 30, 1886 (aged 38); Lone Tree, Johnson County, Iowa, US
- Resting place: Lone Tree Cemetery, Lone Tree, Johnson County, Iowa, US
- Other name: Sarah Ellen Harding Baker
- Known for: Solar System Quilt
- Spouse: Marion Baker
- Children: 7
- Scientific career
- Fields: Astronomy

Ellen Harding Baker, née Sarah Ellen Harding (June 8, 1847 – March 30, 1886), was an American astronomer and a teacher. She is known for her Solar System Quilt, used as a teaching aid in her lectures on astronomy.

== Personal life ==
Sarah Ellen Harding married Marion Baker from Cedar County, Iowa on October 10, 1867. During the 1870s, the family moved to Lone Tree, Johnson County where Marion had a general merchandise business. The couple had seven children together.

== Death ==
Ellen Harding Baker succumbed to tuberculosis on March 30, 1886.

== Notable work ==
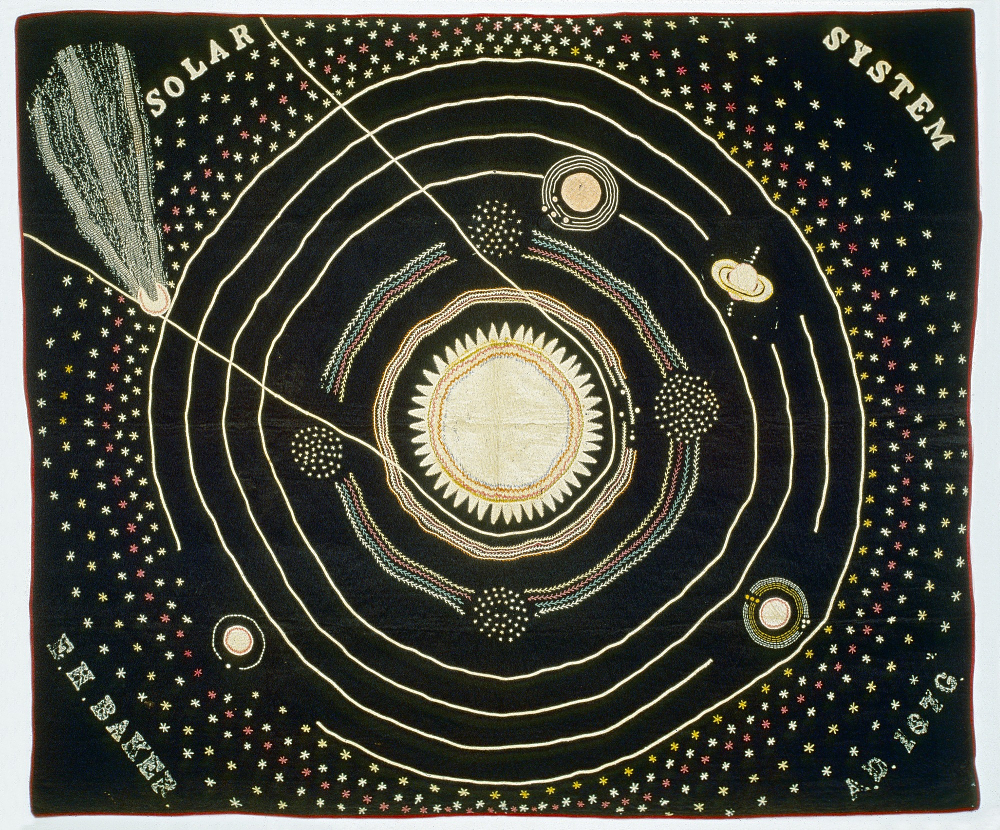
Created in 1876 by Ellen Harding Baker and used to assist with her astronomy lectures.

Ellen Harding Baker likely began creating the Solar System Quilt in 1876 as evidenced by the "A.D 1876" embroidered in the lower right corner. It apparently took her until 1883 to complete the project. In September of that year, The New York Times picked up a quote from an Iowa newspaper that "Mrs. M. Baker, of Lone Tree, has just finished a silk quilt which she has been seven years in making. It has the solar system worked in completely and accurately."

The quilt has a wool top embellished with wool-fabric applique, wool braid, and wool and silk embroidery. The design of the quilt resembles the illustrations found in astronomy books of that time period. The quilt shows the Sun at the center and the eight planets of the Solar System (with indicated orbits around the Sun), as well as the asteroid belt. The myriad of stars that exist beyond the Solar System are also shown. The Galilean moons of Jupiter, as well as moons of Earth, Saturn, Neptune and Uranus are included, as are Saturn's rings. The upper left of the quilt shows a large comet, which is likely C/1874 H1, discovered in 1874 by Jérôme Eugène Coggia.

The quilt measures 89 x 106 inches (225 cm x 269 cm). It is currently in possession at the Smithsonian Institution, National Museum of American History. It was donated to the museum by Patricia Hill McCloy and Kathryn Hill Meardon, who are descendants of Baker's daughter Carrie.

A fictionalized backstory of the creation of the Solar System Quilt is told in the children's book She Stitched The Stars: A Story Of Ellen Harding Baker's Solar System Quilt authored by Jennifer Harris.

== Inspiration ==
The article describing the completion of the Solar System Quilt reports that "the lady went to Chicago to view the comet and sun spots through the telescope that she might be very accurate." A telescope had been installed on the Interstate Industrial Exposition Building in Chicago to allow citizens and visitors a view of Coggia's Comet, discovered in 1874. The Great Comet of 1882 may also possibly have been the celestial object that Baker had travelled to Chicago to see.

Another source of inspiration may have been Maria Mitchell, an astronomy professor at Vassar College. In August 1869, Mitchell brought 4 of her female students to Burlington, Iowa to study a solar eclipse. Ironically, Mitchell condemned needlework as "the chain of woman, and has fettered her more than the laws of the country." However, she acknowledged that the attention to detail learned through that craft translates well to the study of astronomy when she wrote that "the eye that directs a needle in the delicate meshes of embroidery will equally well bisect a star with the spider web of the micrometer."
