= IC 4462 =

Galaxy in the constellation Boötes

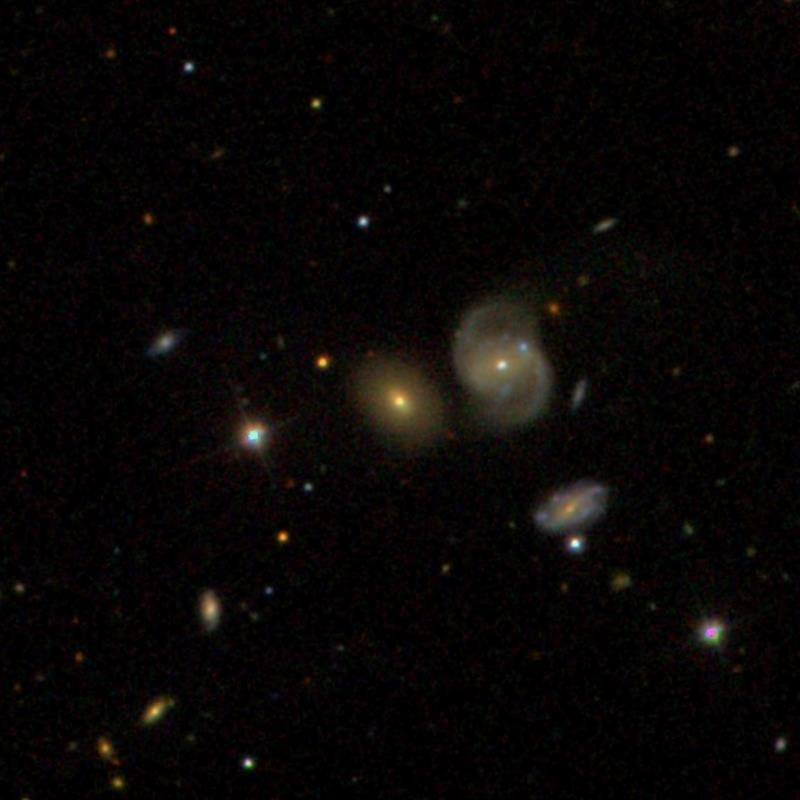

Observation data (J2000 epoch)
- Constellation: Boötes
- Right ascension: 14^{h} 35^{m} 04.1838^{s}
- Declination: +26° 32′ 27.201″
- Redshift: 0.03052 ± 0.00001
- Heliocentric radial velocity: 9,010 ± 3km/s
- Distance: 417 Mly
- Apparent magnitude (V): 12.37 0.042

Characteristics
- Type: E

Other designations
- PGC 52123, 2MASX J14350418+2632268, MCG +05-34-078, Arp 95

IC 4462 is an elliptical galaxy located in the constellation Boötes. It is located 417 million light-years away from the Solar System and was found by Stephane Javelle on June 22, 1895 the same day he discovered IC 4461, a spiral galaxy. It is gravitationally interacting with IC 4461 and possibly might merge with the latter in the future. Both galaxies form Arp 95, which they are classified under galaxies that have elliptical companions. Sometimes the galaxy is confused with IC 4461.
