= NGC 446 =

Lenticular galaxy in the constellation Pisces

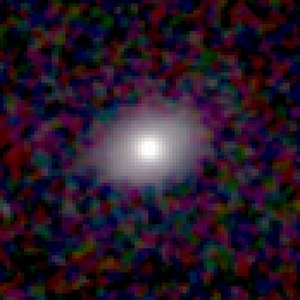
- NGC 446 as seen by 2MASS

Observation data (J2000 epoch)
- Constellation: Pisces
- Right ascension: 01^{h} 16^{m} 03.6^{s}
- Declination: +04° 17′ 39″
- Redshift: 0.018166
- Heliocentric radial velocity: 5,446 km/s
- Apparent magnitude (V): 13.35
- Absolute magnitude (V): -21.06

Characteristics
- Type: (R)SAB0^0
- Apparent size (V): 2.0' × 1.6'

Other designations
- UGC 00818, MRK 0565, CGCG 411-016, MCG +01-04-012, 2MASX J01160360+0417385, IRAS 01134+0401, PGC 4578, IC 89.

NGC 446 is a lenticular galaxy of type (R)SAB0^0 located in the constellation Pisces. It was first discovered on October 23, 1864, by Albert Marth (and later listed as NGC 446); it was also seen on August 20, 1892, by Stéphane Javelle (and later listed as IC 89). It was described by Dreyer as "faint, very small, stellar."

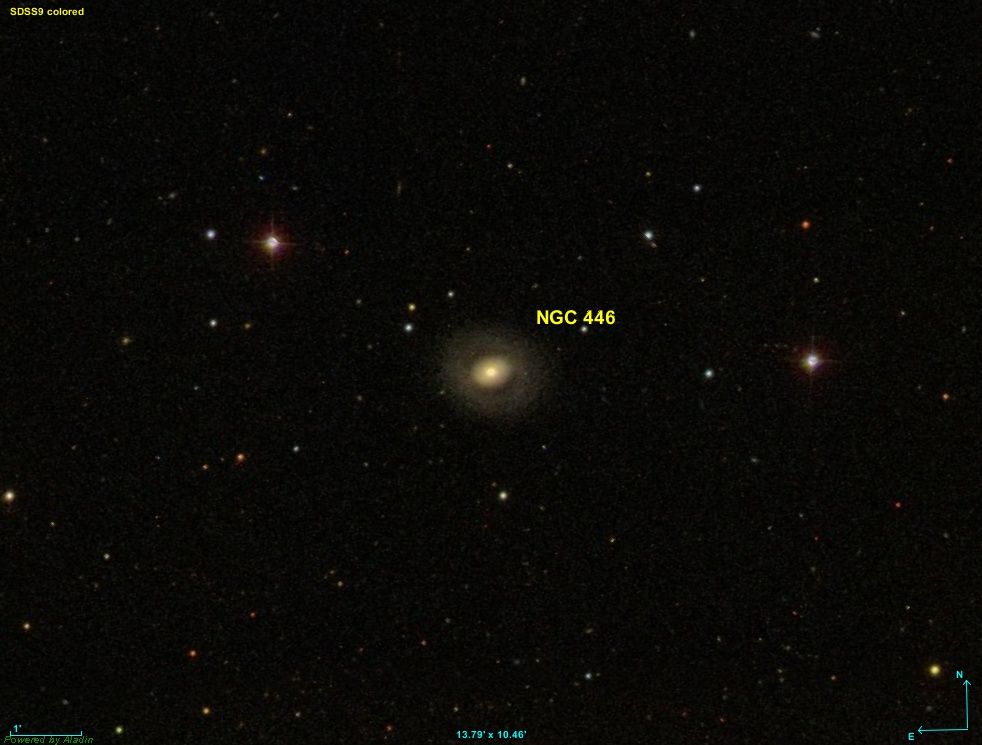
Image by the SDSS.
