= IC 1166 =

Pair of galaxies in Corona Borealis

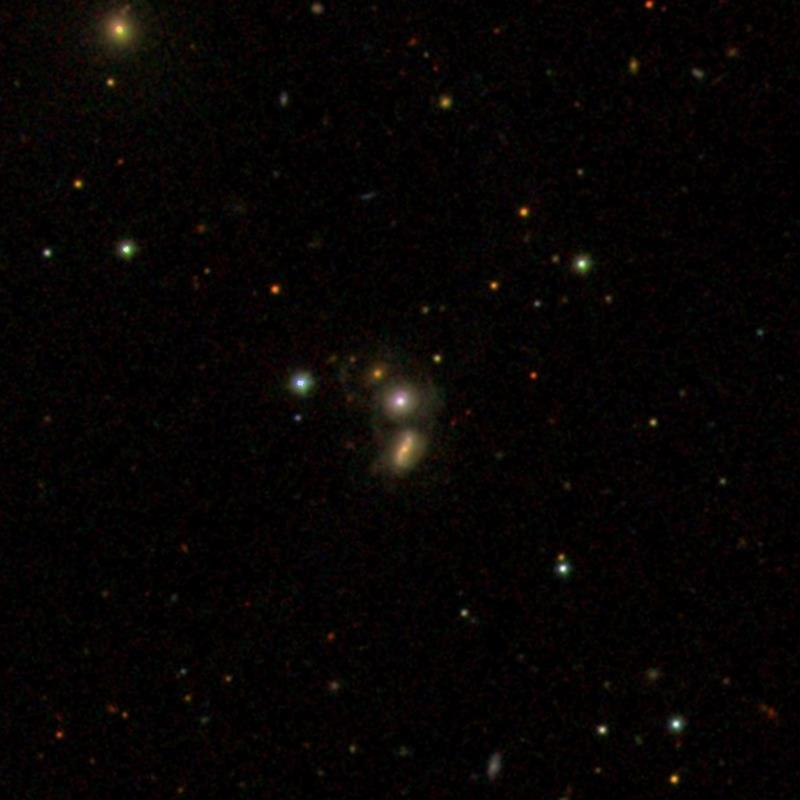
- Sloan Digital Sky Survey image of galaxy pair IC 1166

Observation data (J2000 epoch)
- Constellation: Corona Borealis
- Right ascension: 16h 02m 08.90s
- Declination: +26d 19m 38.0s
- Redshift: 0.072080
- Heliocentric radial velocity: 20,818 km/s
- Distance: 977 Mly (299.54 Mpc)
- Apparent magnitude (V): 16.77 and 19.08
- Surface brightness: 23 and 23.4 mag/arcsec

Characteristics
- Type: E and SBb
- Size: 110,000 ly and 160,000 ly
- Notable features: Interacting galaxy and Seyfert galaxy

Other designations
- IC 1166 NED01: PGC 56771, Mrk 867, 2MASX J16020888+2619456, SDSS J160208.91+261945.5, NVSS J160208+261942, KUG 1600+264, CGCG 137-018, IRAS 16000+2628, PGC 1772024, Mrk 867N IC 1166 NED02: PGC 1771884, UZC J160208.9+261929, 2MASX J16020881+2619316, SDSS J160208.82+261931.1, Mrk 867S

IC 1166 is a pair of galaxies in the constellation Corona Borealis comprising IC 1166 NED01 and IC 1166 NED02. They are located 977 million light-years from the Solar System and were discovered on July 28, 1892, by Stephane Javelle.

== Galaxies ==
IC 1166 NED01

IC 1166 NED01 or PGC 56771 is a type E elliptical galaxy. Located above IC 1166 NED02, it has a diameter of approximately 110,000 light-years. PGC 56771 has an active nucleus and it is classified as a Seyfert type 1 galaxy. It has a quasar-like appearance, but its host clearly seen and presents two sets of emission lines which are superimposed on each other. PGC 56771 is classified a Markarian galaxy (designated Mrk 867), because compared to other galaxies its nucleus emits excessive amounts of ultraviolet rays. It has a surface brightness of 23.2 magnitude and, located at right ascension (16:02:08.92) and declination (26:19:45.60) respectively.

IC 1166 NED02

IC 1166 NED02 or PGC 1771884 is a type SBbc spiral galaxy. Located below IC 1166 NED01, it has an approximate diameter of 160,000 light-years making it slightly larger compared to the other galaxy and does not have an active galactic nucleus. PGC 1771884 has a surface brightness of 23.4 magnitude and, a right ascension of (16:02:08.83) and declination (26:19:31.20).
