= 193 Ambrosia =

Asteroid in the main belt of asteroids

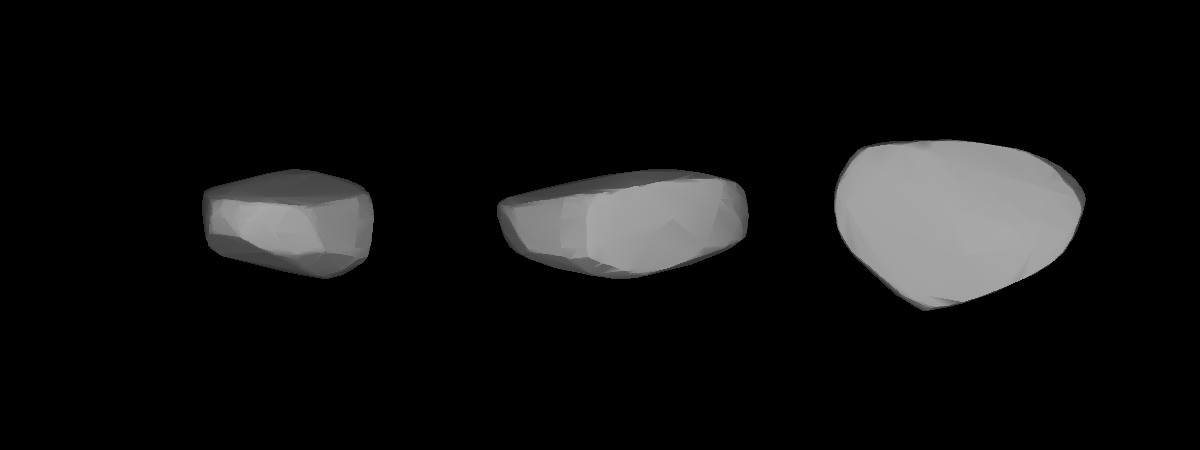
- A three-dimensional model of 193 Ambrosia based on its lightcurve

Discovery
- Discovered by: J. Coggia, 1879
- Discovery date: 28 February 1879

Designations
- Pronunciation: /æmˈbroʊʒiə/
- Alternative designations: A879 DB; 1915 RB
- Minor planet category: Main belt

Orbital characteristics
- Epoch 31 July 2016 (JD 2457600.5)
- Uncertainty parameter 0
- Observation arc: 100.12 yr (36569 d)
- Aphelion: 3.3720 AU (504.44 Gm)
- Perihelion: 1.8302 AU (273.79 Gm)
- Semi-major axis: 2.6011 AU (389.12 Gm)
- Eccentricity: 0.29638
- Orbital period (sidereal): 4.20 yr (1532.2 d)
- Mean anomaly: 331.40°
- Mean motion: 0° 14^{m} 5.82^{s} / day
- Inclination: 12.010°
- Longitude of ascending node: 349.97°
- Argument of perihelion: 81.365°

Physical characteristics
- Mean diameter: 26 km
- Synodic rotation period: 6.580 hours 6.581 h (0.2742 d)
- Geometric albedo: 0.10
- Absolute magnitude (H): 9.68

193 Ambrosia (Symbol:) is a main belt asteroid that was discovered by the Corsican-born French astronomer J. Coggia on February 28, 1879, and named after either Ambrosia, the food of the gods in Greek mythology, or Ambrosia, one of the Hyades. Lutz D. Schmadel argued that the second possibility was more likely, based on the fact that Coggia named another asteroid, 217 Eudora, after another of the Hyades.

In 2009, photometric observations of this asteroid were made at the Palmer Divide Observatory in Colorado Springs, Colorado. The resulting light curve shows a synodic rotation period of 6.580 ± 0.001 hours with a brightness variation of 0.11 ± 0.02 in magnitude. This result is consistent with an independent study performed in 1996.
