= IC 860 =

Galaxy in the constellation of Coma Berenices

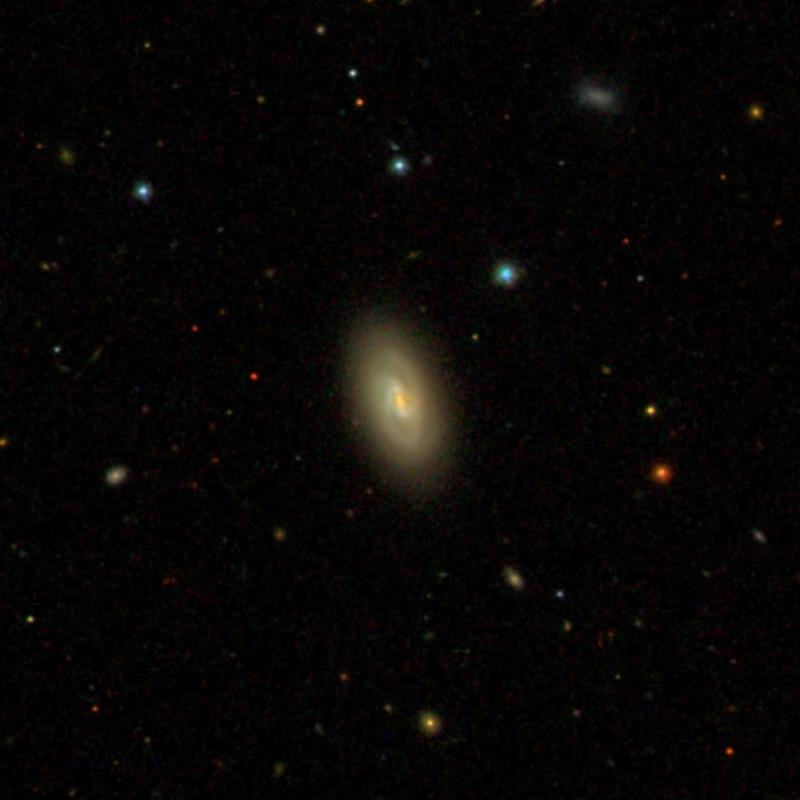
- SDSS image of IC 860

Observation data (J2000 epoch)
- Constellation: Coma Berenices
- Right ascension: 13^{h} 15^{m} 03.50^{s}
- Declination: +24° 37′ 07.79″
- Redshift: 0.012909
- Heliocentric radial velocity: 3,870 km/s
- Distance: 155 Mly (47.52 Mpc)
- Apparent magnitude (V): 0.044
- Apparent magnitude (B): 0.057

Characteristics
- Type: Sa, HII;LIRG
- Size: 35,000 ly
- Apparent size (V): 0.5' × 0.3'
- Notable features: luminous infrared galaxy

Other designations
- CGCG 130-023, IRAS 13126+2452, ECO 03976, MCG +04-31-015, PGC 46086

IC 860 is a barred spiral galaxy in the constellation of Coma Berenices. It is located 155 million light years away from Earth. It was discovered on June 16, 1892, by Stephan Javelle, a French astronomer. It is a peculiar galaxy.

IC 860 is classified a nearby post-starburst galaxy, in early stages of transforming into its quiescent state. It is also vibrationally excited HCN luminous infrared galaxy (LIRG) with L_{HCN} -_{VIB}/L_{IR} of 3.2 × 10^{−8}. It has a dust obscured nucleus making it hard to determine whether it is a starburst galaxy or an active galactic nucleus (AGN). In additional, the galaxy contains HI and OH absorption towards its central region. The galaxy has an implied mass of M_{SMBH} of 4 × 10^{7} M_{Θ} based on its velocity rotation of v_{rot} = 226 km s^{−1}. The Eddington luminosity of IC 860 is 2 × 10^{12} L_{Θ}.

According to low [C II] 157.7 μm-to-L_{FIR} ratios and by a mid-infrared silicate absorption, the findings suggest IC 860 does have a warm compact region. The region of the galaxy, is in a current phase of rapid evolution where inflows are accumulating column densities of interstellar dust and gas, sufficient to fuel its star formation or its AGN.

IC 860 was also observed in optical imaging. From the results, the galaxy has a massive V-shaped kiloparsec dust structure. As the nuclear gas only has an outflow velocity of v_{out} = 170 – 200 km s^{−1}, this makes it impossible to escape from the galaxy unless being accelerated.

In another study, IC 860 contains 4.83 GHz formaldehyde emission with a peak flux density of 2.0-2.2 mJy based from observations made by Arecibo Observatory. It is found to have three unique emission compartments centered between 3830 and 3990 km s^{−1}.
