= Lalande Prize =

Award for scientific advances in astronomy (1802–1970)

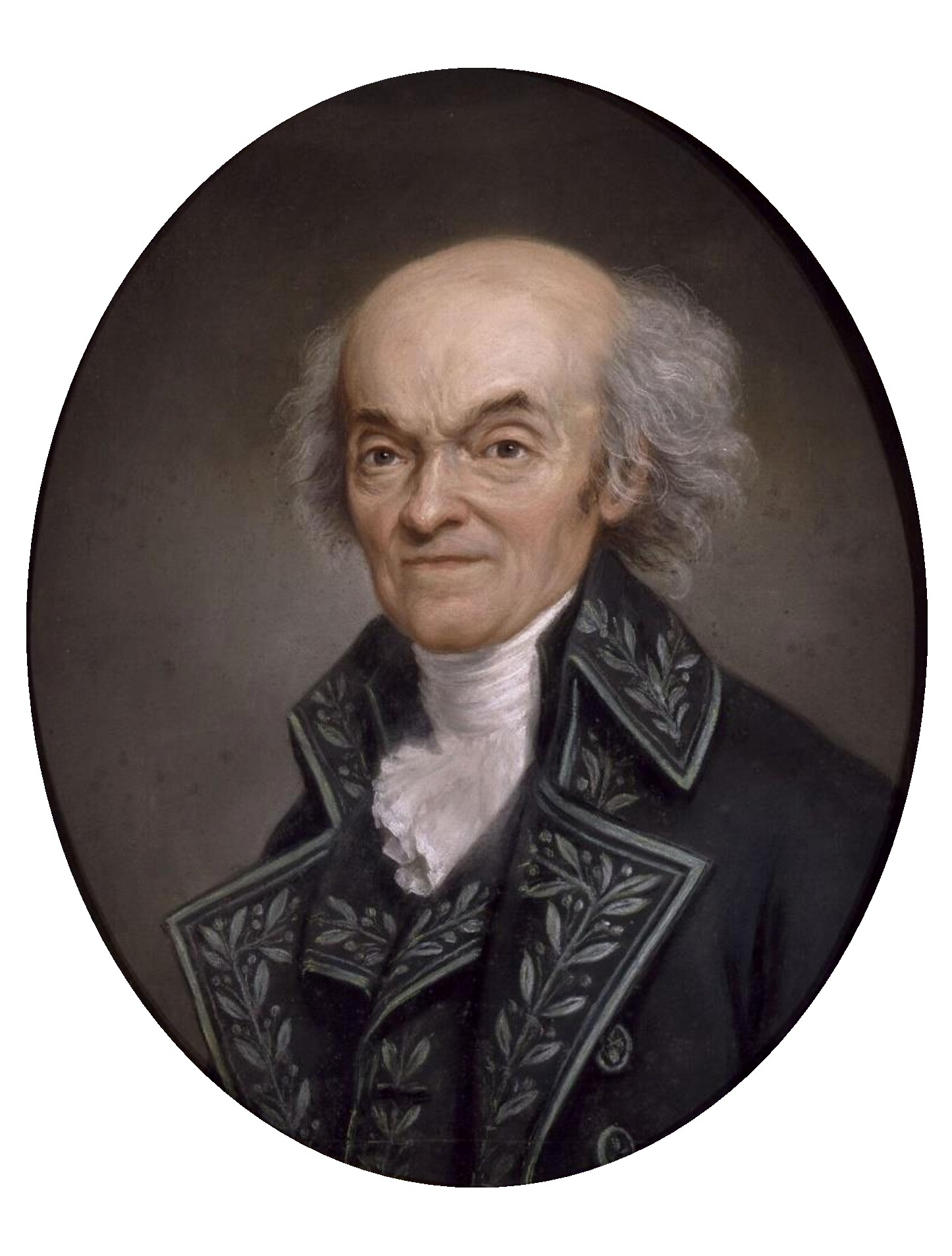
Jérôme Lalande

The Lalande Prize (French: Prix Lalande also known as Lalande Medal) was an award for scientific advances in astronomy, given from 1802 until 1970 by the French Academy of Sciences.

The prize was endowed by astronomer Jérôme Lalande in 1801, a few years before his death in 1807, to enable the Academy of Sciences to make an annual award "to the person who makes the most unusual observation or writes the most useful paper to further the progress of Astronomy, in France or elsewhere."

The awarded amount grew in time: in 1918 the amount awarded was 1000 Francs, and by 1950, it was 10,000 francs.

It was combined with the Valz Prize (Prix Valz) in 1970 to create the Lalande-Valz Prize and then with a further 122 foundation prizes in 1997, resulting in the establishment of the Grande Médaille. The Grande Medaille is not limited to the field of astronomy.

== Winners ==
- 1803: Wilhelm Olbers
- 1804: Giuseppe Piazzi
- 1805: Karl Ludwig Harding
- 1806: Jöns Svanberg
- 1807: Wilhelm Olbers
- 1808: Claude-Louis Mathieu
- 1809: Carl Friedrich Gauss
- 1810: Siméon Denis Poisson
- 1811: Jabbo Oltmanns, Friedrich Bessel
- 1812: Bernhard von Lindenau
- 1813: Pierre Daussy
- 1814: Giuseppe Piazzi
- 1815: Claude-Louis Mathieu
- 1816: Friedrich Bessel
- 1817: John Pond
- 1818: Jean-Louis Pons
- 1819: Joseph Nicollet, Johann Franz Encke
- 1820: Joseph Nicollet, Jean-Louis Pons
- 1821: no award
- 1822: no award
- 1823: Carl Ludwig Christian Rümker, Jean-Félix Adolphe Gambart
- 1824: Marie-Charles Damoiseau
- 1825: John Herschel, James South
- 1826: Edward Sabine
- 1827: Jean-Louis Pons, Jean-Félix Adolphe Gambart
- 1828: Francesco Carlini, Giovanni Plana
- 1829: no award
- 1830: Jean-Félix Adolphe Gambart, Henri Gambey, Louis-Frédéric Perrelet
- 1831: no award
- 1832: Jean-Félix Adolphe Gambart, Benjamin Valz
- 1833: John Herschel
- 1834: George Biddell Airy
- 1835: James Dunlop, Palon Heinrich Ludwig von Boguslawsky
- 1836: Wilhelm Beer, Johann Heinrich von Mädler
- 1837: Henri Guinand
- 1838: S. M. B. Brousseaud
- 1839: Johann Gottfried Galle
- 1840: Carl Bremiker
- 1841: no award
- 1842: Paul Auguste Ernest Laugier
- 1843: Victor Mauvais, Hervé Faye
- 1844: Francis de Vico, Heinrich Louis d'Arrest
- 1845: Karl Ludwig Hencke
- 1846: Johann Gottfried Galle
- 1847: John Russell Hind, Karl Ludwig Hencke
- 1848: Andrew Graham
- 1849: Annibale de Gasparis
- 1850: Annibale de Gasparis, John Russell Hind
- 1851: John Russell Hind, Annibale de Gasparis
- 1852: John Russell Hind, Annibale de Gasparis, Robert Luther, Jean Chacornac, Hermann Goldschmidt
- 1853: Annibale de Gasparis, Jean Chacornac, Robert Luther, John Russell Hind
- 1854: Robert Luther, Albert Marth, John Russell Hind, James Ferguson and Hermann Goldschmidt
- 1855: Jean Chacornac, Robert Luther and Hermann Goldschmidt
- 1856: Jean Chacornac and Norman Pogson
- 1857: Hermann Goldschmidt and Karl Christian Bruhns
- 1858: Joseph Jean Pierre Laurent, Hermann Goldschmidt, George Mary Searle, Horace Parnell Tuttle, August Winnecke and Giovanni Battista Donati
- 1859: Robert Luther
- 1860: Robert Luther, Hermann Goldschmidt, Jean Chacornac, James Ferguson, Wilhelm Julius Foerster and Oskar Lesser
- 1861: Ernst Wilhelm Tempel, Robert Luther and Hermann Goldschmidt
- 1862: Alvan Graham Clark
- 1863: Jean Chacornac
- 1864: Richard Christopher Carrington
- 1865: Warren de la Rue
- 1866: Thomas Maclear
- 1867: Giovanni Schiaparelli
- 1868: Pierre Jules Janssen
- 1869: James Craig Watson
- 1870: William Huggins
- 1871: Alphonse Borrelly
- 1872: Paul Henry and Prosper Henry
- 1873: Jérôme Eugène Coggia
- 1874: Amédée Mouchez, Jean Jacques Anatole Bouquet de La Grye, Georges-Ernest Fleuriais, Charles André, Héraud, Félix Tisserand
- 1875: Henri Perrotin
- 1876: Johann Palisa
- 1877: Asaph Hall
- 1878: Stanislas-Étienne Meunier
- 1879: Christian Heinrich Friedrich Peters
- 1880: Ormond Stone
- 1881: Lewis Swift
- 1882: Cyrille Souillart
- 1883: Jean Jacques Anatole Bouquet de La Grye, Octave de Bernardières, J. L. Courcelle-Seneuil, Georges-Ernest Fleuriais, Phillipe Hatt, Henri Perrotin, Jean Antoine Léon Bassot, Guillaume Bigourdan, Octave Callandreau
- 1884: Rodolphe Radau
- 1885: Louis Thollon
- 1886: Oskar Backlund
- 1887: Nils Christoffer Dunér
- 1888: Joseph Bossert
- 1889: François Gonnessiat
- 1890: Giovanni Schiaparelli
- 1891: Guillaume Bigourdan
- 1892: Edward Emerson Barnard, Max Wolf
- 1893: Léopold Schulhof
- 1894: Stéphane Javelle
- 1895: Maurice Hamy
- 1896: Pierre Puiseux
- 1897: Charles Dillon Perrine
- 1898: Seth Carlo Chandler
- 1899: William Robert Brooks
- 1900: Michel Giacobini
- 1901: John M. Thome
- 1902: Charles Trépied
- 1903: William Wallace Campbell
- 1904: Sherburne Wesley Burnham
- 1905: William Henry Pickering, for a nonexistent moon
- 1906: Robert Grant Aitken, William Hussey
- 1907: Thomas Crompton Lewis
- 1908: William Lewis Elkin, Frederick L. Chase, Mason F. Smith
- 1909: Alphonse Borrelly
- 1910: Philip Herbert Cowell, Andrew Crommelin
- 1911: Lewis Boss
- 1912: Hermann Kobold and Carl Wilhelm Wirtz
- 1913: Jean Bosler
- 1914: Joseph-Noël Guillaume
- 1915: Lucien d'Azambuja
- 1916: Jérôme Eugène Coggia
- 1917: Robert Jonckhèere
- 1918: Aristarkh Belopolsky
- 1919: Vesto Slipher
- 1920: Léopold Schulhof
- 1921: Paul Henri Strooband
- 1922: Henry Norris Russell
- 1924: Jules Baillaud
- 1925: Georges Fournier
- 1927: Vincent Nechville
- 1928: Bernard Ferdinand Lyot
- 1929: Alexandre Veronnet
- 1930: Nicolas Stoyko
- 1931: Irénée Lagarde
- 1932: Abel Porteau
- 1934: Daniel Barbier
- 1935: Lucien d'Azambuja
- 1936: Louis Boyer
- 1937: Michel Giacobini
- 1938: André Lallemand
- 1939: Marguerite Laugier
- 1940: Charles Bertaud
- 1941: Henri Grenat
- 1942: Henri Camichel
- 1943: Alexandre Schaumasse
- 1944: Not awarded
- 1945: Henry Berthomieu
- 1946-1947: Not awarded
- 1948: Maxime Nicolini
- 1949: Not awarded
- 1950: Charles Fehrenbach
- 1951-1959: Not awarded
- 1960: Marie Bloch
- 1961-1965: Not awarded
- 1968-1969: Not awarded
- 1970: Jean Jung

== See also ==
- List of astronomy awards
- List of Nobel laureates—Nobel Prizes
