= NGC 2804 =

Galaxy in the constellation Cancer

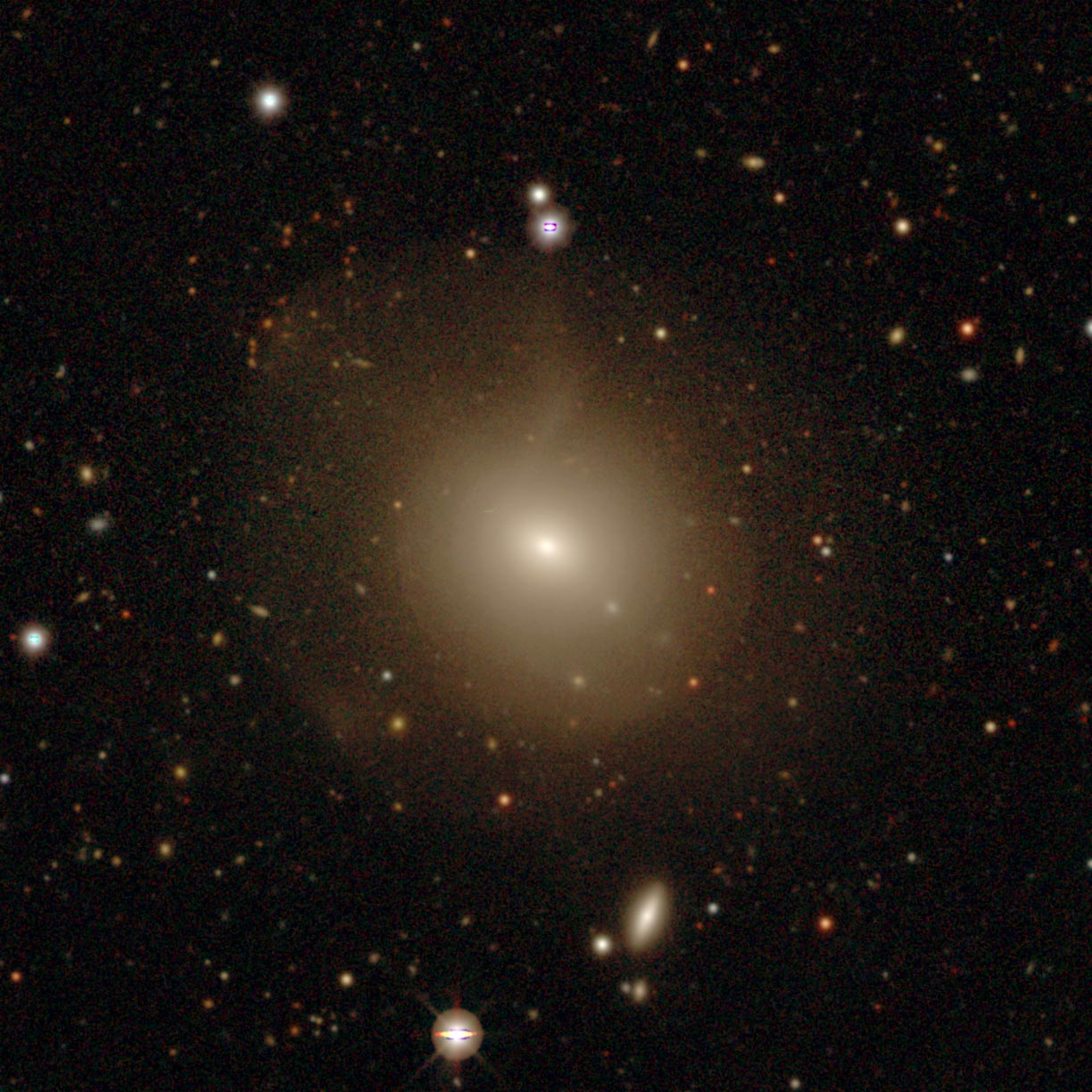
- NGC 2804 imaged by Legacy Surveys

Observation data (J2000 epoch)
- Constellation: Cancer
- Right ascension: 09^{h} 16^{m} 50.0173^{s}
- Declination: +20° 11′ 54.631″
- Redshift: 0.027662
- Heliocentric radial velocity: 8293 ± 3 km/s
- Distance: 412.8 ± 28.9 Mly (126.55 ± 8.86 Mpc)
- Apparent magnitude (V): 12.8

Characteristics
- Type: S0
- Size: ~226,100 ly (69.31 kpc) (estimated)
- Apparent size (V): 1.4′ × 1.2′

Other designations
- 2MASX J09165000+2011548, IC 2455, UGC 4901, MCG +03-24-028, PGC 26196, CGCG 091-047

NGC 2804 is a lenticular galaxy in the constellation of Cancer. Its velocity with respect to the cosmic microwave background is 8580 ± 20 km/s, which corresponds to a Hubble distance of 126.55 ± 8.86 Mpc (~413 million light-years). It was discovered by British astronomer John Herschel on 24 February 1827. This galaxy was also observed by the French astronomer Stéphane Javelle on 9 April 1896, and was later added to the Index Catalogue as IC 2455.

According to the SIMBAD database, NGC 2804 is a LINER galaxy, i.e. a galaxy whose nucleus has an emission spectrum characterized by broad lines of weakly ionized atoms.

One supernova has been observed in NGC 2804: SN 2023ftr (Type Ia, mag. 18.51) was discovered by the Zwicky Transient Facility on 16 April 2023.

== See also ==
- List of NGC objects (2001–3000)
