= Hamy =

Hamy is a French surname of Arabic origin. Notable people with this surname include:

- Ernest Hamy (1842–1908), French anthropologist and ethnologist
- Maurice Hamy (1861–1936), French astronomer
- Paul Hamy (born 1982), French actor and model
