= IC 4271 =

Spiral galaxy located in constellation Canes Venatici

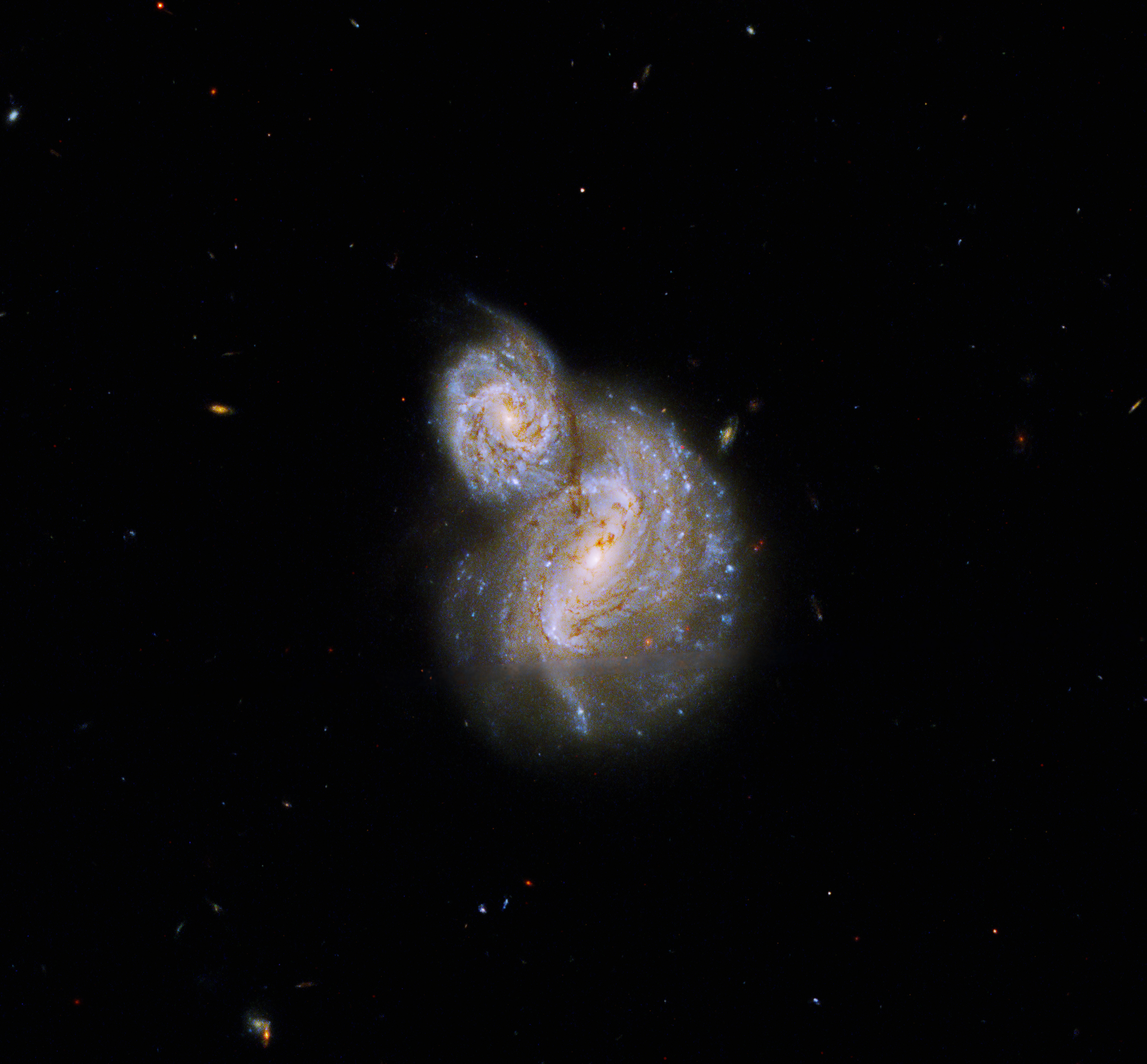
- IC 4271 captured by Hubble

Observation data (J2000 epoch)
- Constellation: Canes Venatici
- Right ascension: 13h 29m 21.40s
- Declination: +37d 24m 42.0s
- Redshift: 0.057000
- Heliocentric radial velocity: 16,625 km/s
- Distance: 800 Mly (245.3 Mpc)
- Apparent magnitude (V): 15 (15.3)
- Apparent magnitude (B): 15.8 (16.3)
- Surface brightness: 13.3 (12.5)

Characteristics
- Type: SBab? pec + Sc?
- Size: 157,000 ly (48.16 kpc)
- Apparent size (V): 0.8' x 0.5'

Other designations
- PGC 47334, Arp 40, NVSS J132921+372447, MCG +06-30-15, Z 190-12, VV 355

IC 4271 is a spiral galaxy located some 800 million light-years away in the constellation Canes Venatici. It is 157,000 light-years in diameter. IC 4271 was first located on July 10, 1896, by Stephane Javelle, a French astronomer. It hosts a Seyfert type 2 nucleus, containing an acceleration disc around its supermassive black hole which releases large amounts of radiation, hence its bright appearance. IC 4271 appears to be interacting with its smaller neighboring galaxy, PGC 3096774.

Both galaxies form Arp 40. In the Atlas of Peculiar Galaxies created by Halton Arp, they fall under spiral galaxies that have companions with low-surface-brightness.
