= IC 2431 =

Interacting galaxies in the constellation Cancer

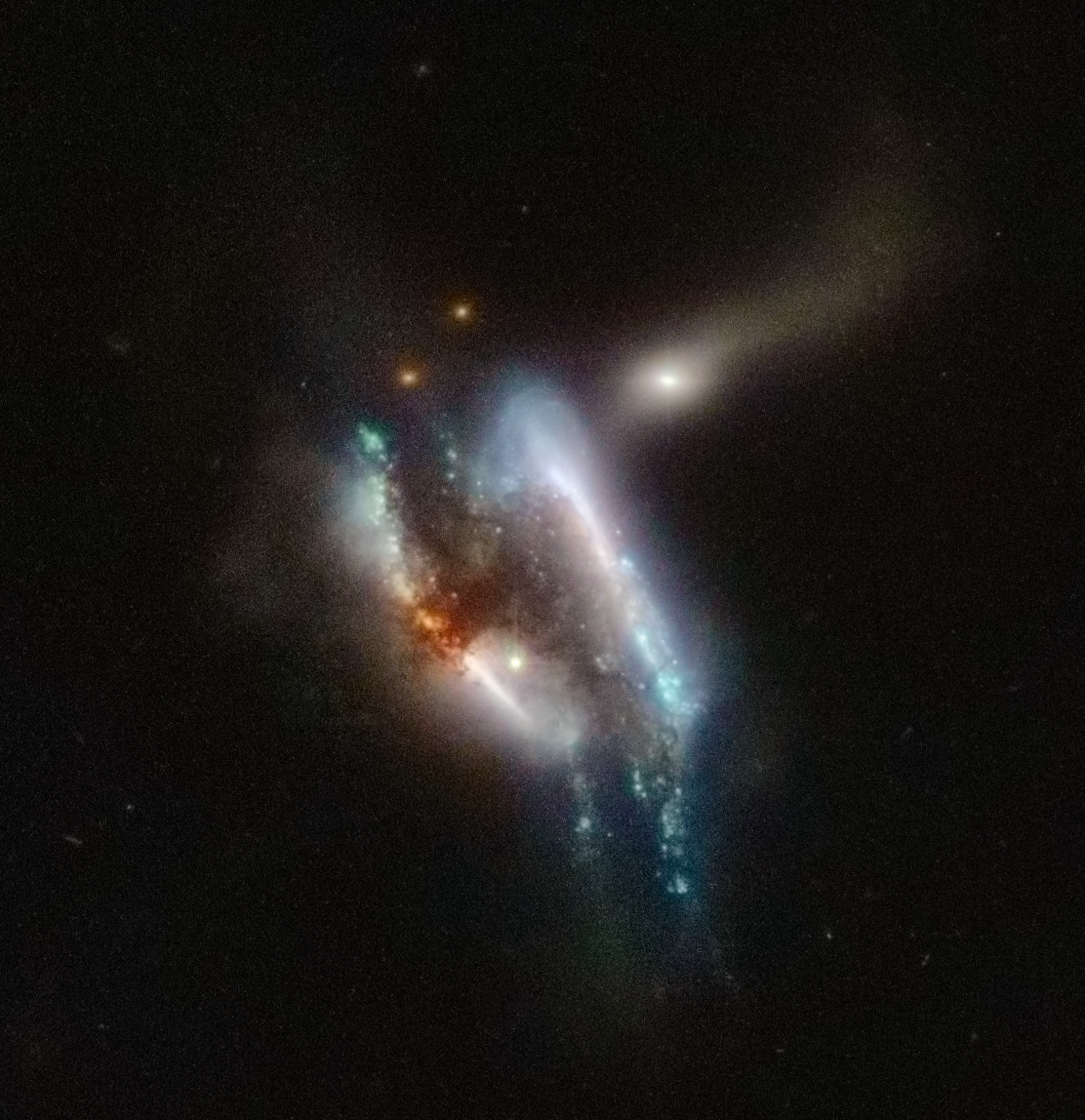
- Hubble Space Telescope and PAN-STARRS image of IC 2431

Observation data (J2000 epoch)
- Constellation: Cancer
- Right ascension: 09h 04m 35.35s
- Declination: +14d 35m 38.7s
- Redshift: 0.049700
- Heliocentric radial velocity: 14,579 km/s
- Distance: 684 Mly (209.71 Mpc)
- Apparent magnitude (V): 14.3

Characteristics
- Type: Group
- Notable features: Interacting galaxies

Other designations
- PGC 25476, CGCG 090-063, UGC 4756, Mrk 1224, IRAS 09018+1447, SFRS 040, MCG +03-23-030, NVSS J090434+143538, VV 645, LSBC D634-04, AKARI J0904345+143541, VLSS J0904.5+1435, TXS 0901+147, LEDA 25476

IC 2431 are a group of interacting galaxies in the constellation of Cancer. They are located 684 million light-years away from the Solar System and were discovered on February 24, 1896, by Stephane Javelle.

== Characteristics ==
There are at least three galaxies involved in the gravitational interaction. They are IC 2431 NED01 (known as PGC 200245), IC 2431 NED02 (known as NSA 135647) and IC 2431 NED03 (known as PGC 200246). Additionally, a fourth galaxy (PGC 200247) might also be involved in the interaction. As they draw closer to each other, the forces are causing them to tear each other apart. This is common in the universe and all large galaxies, including the Milky Way own their size to violent mergers.

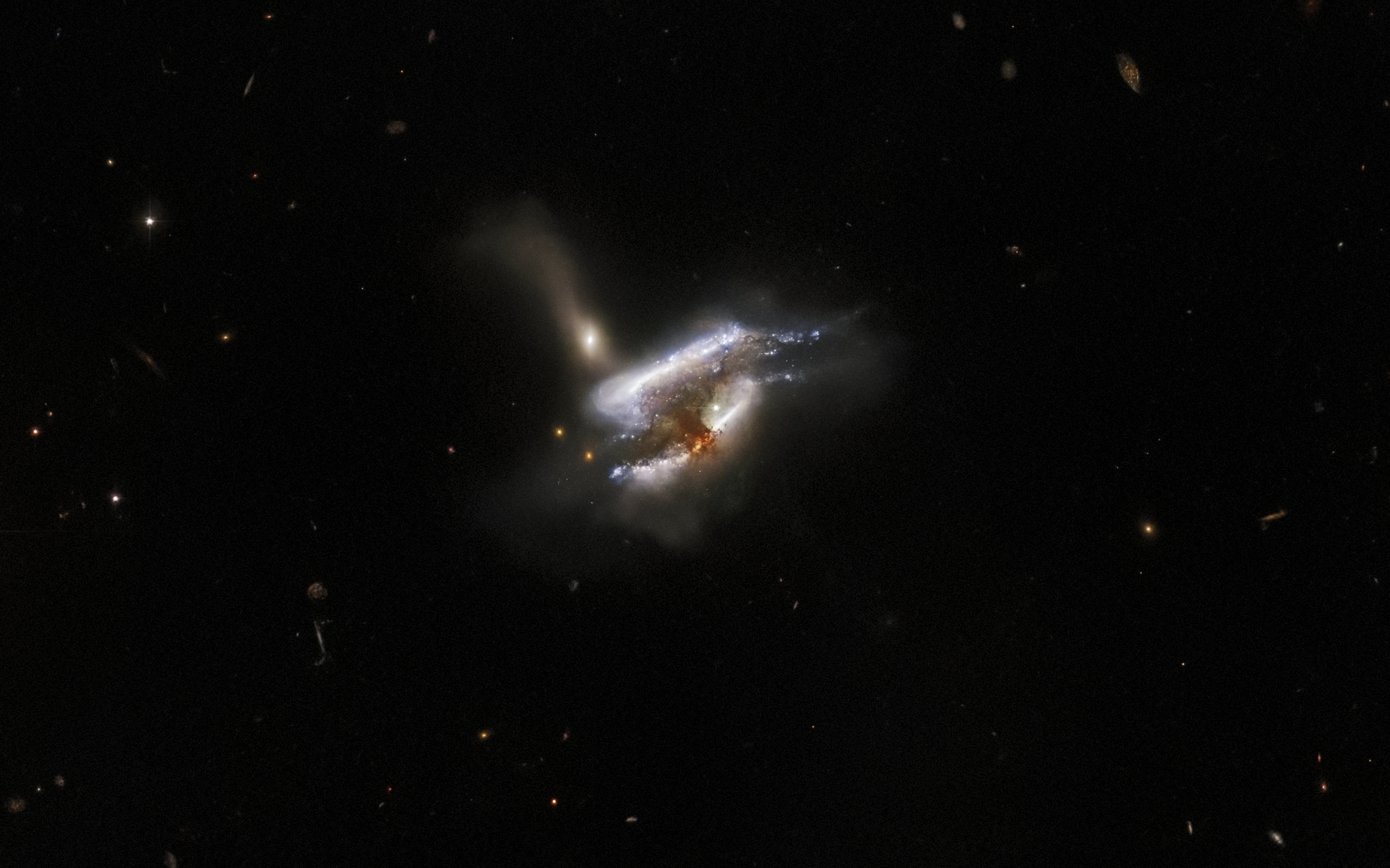
Hubble image of IC 2431

The galaxies are undergoing tumultuous mixture of star formation and tidal distortions which are caused by the interaction. In the center, a thick cloud of dust is seen obscuring, which light from a background galaxy is piercing its outer extremities. Also, they display a thermally-dominated X-ray emission which is much more in excess of expectations based on its own star formation rate.

The highest Star Formation Rate in IC 2431 is IC 2431 NED02, which has a SFR of 23.76 M⊙/yr and has a Stellar mass of 10.74 ± 0.07. In contrast, IC 2431 NED03 has a SFR of 0.5 M⊙/yr and a Stellar mass of 10.18 ± 0.07. Chandra X-ray Observatory detect IC 2431 as a X-ray luminous source. IC 2431 NED02 has a Astrophysical Plasma Emission Code (APEC) $L_X$ of $10^{41.99}$ and IC 2431 NED01 has a APEC $L_X$ of $10^{41.51}$. IC 2431 has a Astrophysical Plasma Emission Code of $10^{42.06}$.

IC 2431 falls under the category of Markarian Galaxies as Mrk 1224, in which its core shines bright in ultraviolet rays. It is possible that carbon monoxide might be present in the regions of the interacting galaxies, which can be determined by the fraction of interstellar gas and total mass in form of molecules. Not to mention, IC 2431 possibly contains an active nucleus which produces ionized gas outflows.

A Wolf–Rayet star (WR 563) has been identified in IC 2431. In the background of IC 2431, there are several galaxy groups has been identified (SDSS CGB 1991 and SDSS CGB 46392).

== Supernovae ==
- AT 2019yzs (type unknown, mag. 18.3) is a Supernovae in IC 2431 NED02 discovered by Automatic Learning for the Rapid Classification of Events (ALeRCE) and Zwicky Transient Facility.
