= Discovery of Neptune =

1846 discovery of Neptune through mathematically-predicted observation

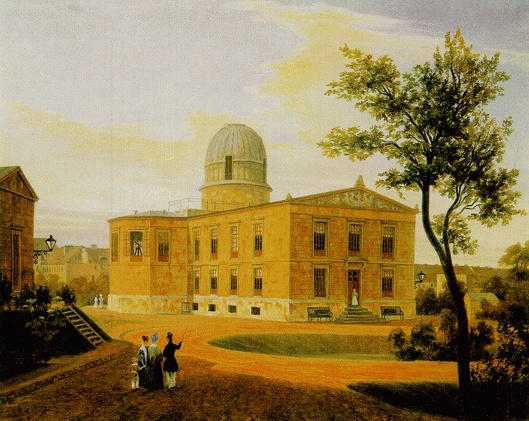
New Berlin Observatory at Linden Street, where Neptune was discovered observationally.

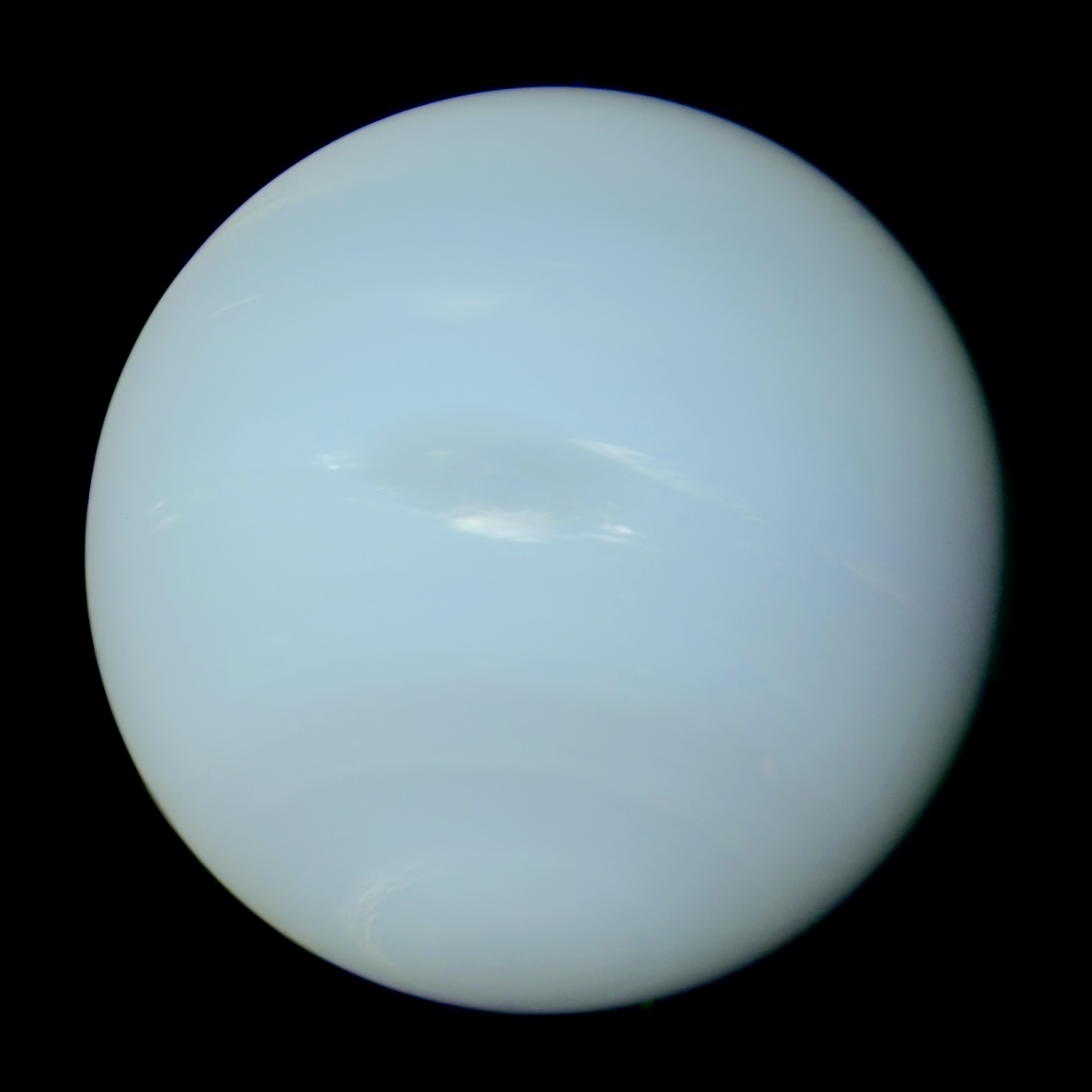
Neptune as imaged by the Voyager 2 probe in 1989

The planet Neptune was mathematically predicted before it was directly observed. With a prediction by Urbain Le Verrier, telescopic observations confirming the existence of a major planet were made on the night of September 23–24, autumnal equinox of 1846, at the Berlin Observatory, by astronomer Johann Gottfried Galle (assisted by Heinrich Louis d'Arrest), working from Le Verrier's calculations. It was a sensational moment of 19th-century science, and dramatic confirmation of Newtonian gravitational theory. In François Arago's apt phrase, Le Verrier had discovered a planet "with the point of his pen".

In retrospect, after it was discovered, it turned out it had been observed many times before but not recognized, and there were others who made calculations about its location which did not lead to its observation. By 1846, the planet Uranus had completed nearly one full orbit since its discovery by William Herschel in 1781, and astronomers had detected a series of irregularities in its path that could not be entirely explained by Newton's law of universal gravitation. These irregularities could, however, be resolved if the gravity of a farther, unknown planet were disturbing its path around the Sun.

In 1845, astronomers Urbain Le Verrier in Paris and John Couch Adams in Cambridge separately began calculations to determine the nature and position of such a planet. Le Verrier's success also led to a tense international dispute over priority, because shortly after the discovery, George Airy, at the time British Astronomer Royal, announced that Adams had also predicted the discovery of the planet. Nevertheless, the Royal Society awarded Le Verrier the Copley medal in 1846 for his achievement, without mention of Adams. The Royal Society, however, also awarded Adams the Copley medal in 1848.

The discovery of Neptune led to the discovery of its moon, Triton, by William Lassell just seventeen days later.

== Earlier observations ==
Neptune is too dim to be visible to the naked eye: its apparent magnitude is never brighter than 7.7. Therefore, the first observations of Neptune were only possible after the invention of the telescope. There is evidence that Neptune was seen and recorded by Galileo Galilei in 1613, Michel Lefrançois de Lalande in 1795, and John Herschel in 1830, but none are known to have recognized it as a planet at the time. These pre-discovery observations were important in accurately determining the orbit of Neptune. Neptune would appear prominently even in early telescopes so other pre-discovery observation records are likely.

Galileo's drawings show that he observed Neptune on December 28, 1612, and again on January 27, 1613; on both occasions, Galileo mistook Neptune for a fixed star when it appeared very close (in conjunction) to Jupiter in the night sky. Historically it was thought that he believed it to be a fixed blue star, and so he is not credited with its discovery. At the time of his first observation in December 1612, it was stationary in the sky because it had just turned retrograde that very day. This meant that Neptune's motion was too slight to be detected at that date, and its apparent size was too small to appear clearly as a planet in Galileo's small telescope. However, there is evidence that Galileo was aware there was something unusual about this "star". On January 28, Galileo recorded in his notebook that a background star (Neptune) had appeared to move, and drew Neptune's position with a dot in a different ink to the fixed stars. This suggests that Galileo had compared his 28 January observation to an earlier sketch drawn on the night of January 6, which would indicate a systematic search among his earlier observations. However, there is no clear evidence that he identified this moving object as a planet. Nor did he ever published these observations, or attempt to observe the moving source again.

In 1847, Sears C. Walker of the U.S. Naval Observatory searched historical records and surveys for possible prediscovery sightings of the planet Neptune. He found that observations made by Lalande's staff at the Paris Observatory in 1795 were in the direction of Neptune's position in the sky. In the catalog observations for May 8 and again on May 10 of 1795 a star was observed in the approximate position expected for Neptune. The uncertainty of the position was noted with a colon. This notation was also used to indicate an observation error so it was not until the original records of the observatory were reviewed that it was established with certainty that the object was Neptune and the position error in the observations made two nights apart was due to the planet's motion across the sky. The discovery of these records of Neptune's position in 1795 led to a better calculation of the planet's orbit.

John Herschel almost discovered Neptune the same way his father, William Herschel, had discovered Uranus in 1781: by chance observation. In an 1846 letter to Wilhelm Struve, John Herschel states that he observed Neptune during a sweep of the sky on July 14, 1830. Although his telescope was powerful enough to resolve Neptune into a small blue disk and show it to be a planet, he did not recognize it at the time and mistook it for a star.

== Irregularities in orbit of Uranus ==
In 1821, Alexis Bouvard had published astronomical tables of the orbit of Uranus, making predictions of future positions based on Newton's laws of motion and gravitation. Subsequent observations revealed substantial deviations from the tables, leading Bouvard to hypothesize some perturbing body. These irregularities, both in the planet's ecliptic longitude and in its radius vector (its distance from the Sun), could have been explained by several hypotheses: the effect of the Sun's gravity at such a great distance might differ from Newton's description; or the discrepancies might simply be observational error; or perhaps Uranus was being pulled, or perturbed, by an undiscovered planet.

At position b, Neptune gravitationally perturbs the orbit of Uranus, pulling it ahead of the predicted location. The reverse is true at a, where the perturbation retards the orbital motion of Uranus.

John Couch Adams learned of these irregularities while still an undergraduate and became convinced of the perturbation hypothesis. Adams believed that he could use the observed data on Uranus and Newton's law of gravitation to deduce the mass, position, and orbit of the perturbing body. After his final examinations in 1843, Adams was elected fellow of his college and spent the summer vacation in Cornwall beginning his calculations.

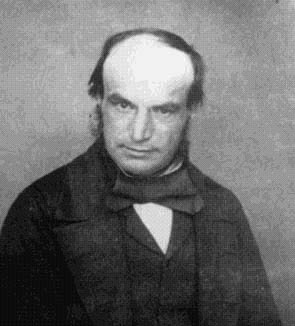
John Couch Adams

In modern terms, the problem is an inverse problem: an attempt to deduce the parameters of a mathematical model from observed data. Although the problem is a simple one for modern mathematics and electronic computers, at the time it involved much laborious manual calculation. Adams began by assuming a nominal position for the hypothesised body, using the empirical Bode's law. He then calculated the projected path of Uranus given the assumed position of the perturbing body and then computed the difference between his projected path and the recorded observations. He then adjusted the characteristics of the perturbing body based on these differences and repeated the process, essentially performing a regression analysis.

On 13 February 1844, James Challis, director of the Cambridge Observatory, contacted Astronomer Royal George Biddell Airy at the Royal Observatory, Greenwich, and requested data on the position of Uranus for Adams. Adams certainly completed some calculations on 18 September 1845.

Adams supposedly communicated his work to Challis in mid-September 1845, but there is some controversy as to how. The story and date of this communication only seem to have come to light in a letter from Challis to the Athenaeum dated 17 October 1846. However, no document was identified until 1904, when astronomer Ralph Allan Sampson found a note in Adams's papers that describes "the New Planet" and is endorsed, in handwriting that is not Adams's, with the note "Received in September 1845". Though this has often been taken to establish Adams's priority, some historians have disputed its authenticity on the basis that "the New Planet" was not a term current in 1845, and on the basis that the note is dated after the fact by someone other than Adams. Furthermore, the results of the calculations are different from those communicated to Airy a few weeks later. Adams certainly gave Challis no detailed calculations and Challis was unimpressed by the description of his method of successively approximating the position of the body, being disinclined to start a laborious observational programme at the observatory. Challis would ultimately remark that "while the labour was certain, success appeared to be so uncertain."

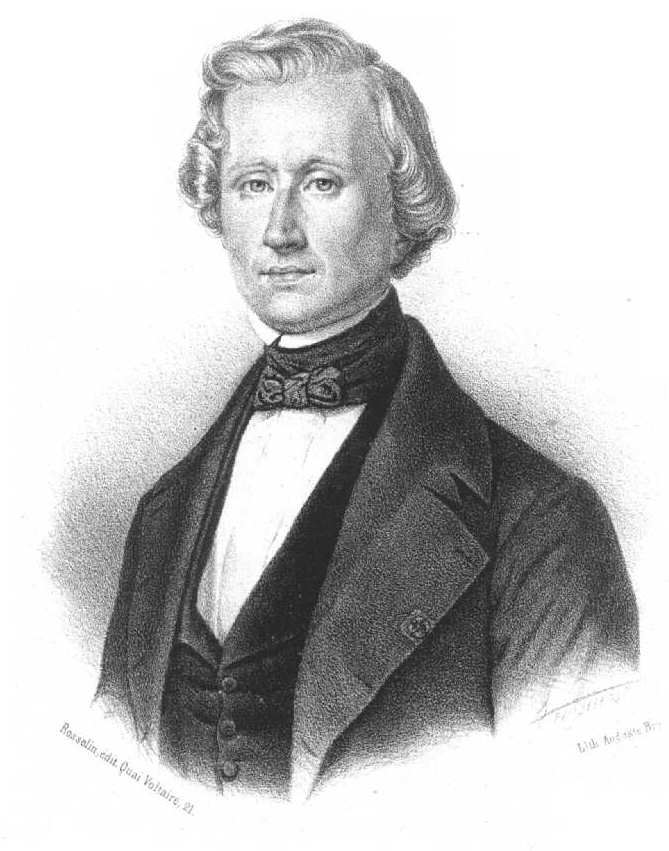
Urbain Jean-Joseph Le Verrier.

Meanwhile, on 10 November 1845, Urbain Le Verrier presented to the Académie des sciences in Paris a memoir on Uranus and showed that the pre-existing theory failed to account for its motion. Unaware of Adams's work, he attempted a similar investigation, and on 1 June 1846, in a second memoir presented to a public meeting of the Académie, he gave the position, but not the mass or orbit, of the proposed perturbing body. Le Verrier located Neptune within one degree of its discovery position.

== The search ==
Upon receiving in England the news of Le Verrier's June prediction, George Airy immediately recognized the similarity of Le Verrier's and Adams' solutions. Up until that moment, Adams' work had been little more than a curiosity, but independent confirmation from Le Verrier spurred Airy to organize a secret attempt to find the planet. At a July 1846 meeting of the Board of Visitors of the Greenwich Observatory, with Challis and Sir John Herschel present, Airy suggested that Challis urgently look for the planet with the Cambridge 11.25 inch equatorial telescope, "in the hope of rescuing the matter from a state which is ... almost desperate". The search was begun by a laborious method on 29 July. Adams continued to work on the problem, providing the British team with six solutions in 1845 and 1846 which sent Challis searching the wrong part of the sky. Only after the discovery of Neptune had been announced in Paris and Berlin did it become apparent that Neptune had been observed on August 8 and August 12 but because Challis lacked an up-to-date star-map, it was not recognized as a planet.

== Discovery observation: 24 September 1846 ==
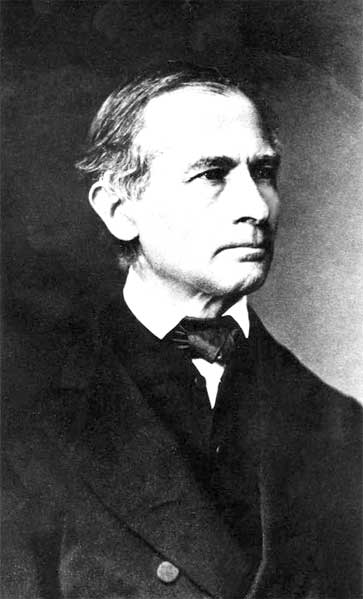
Johann Gottfried Galle, 1880

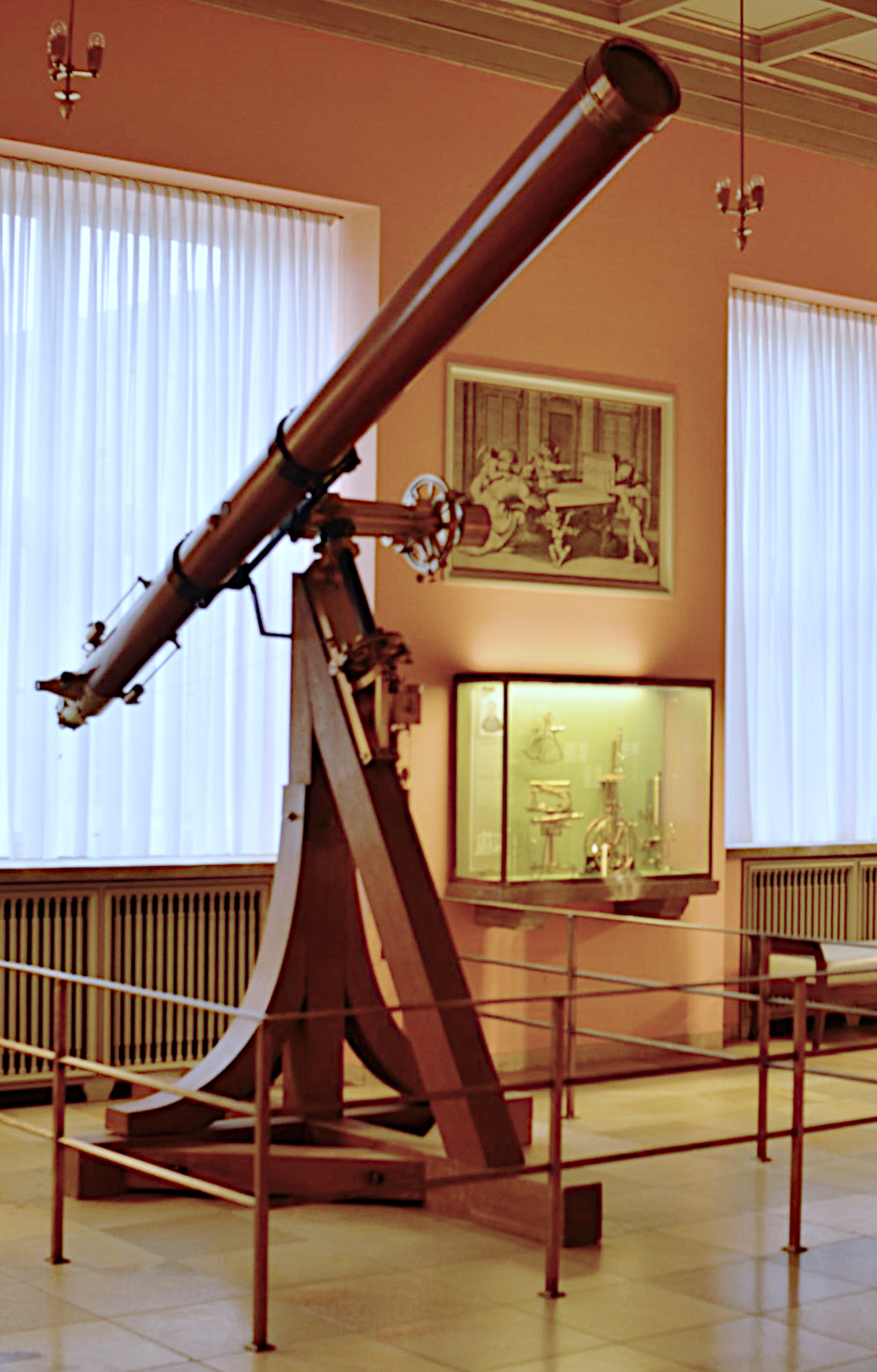
The 9" refractor which was used to discover Neptune is at Deutsches Museum in Munich today.

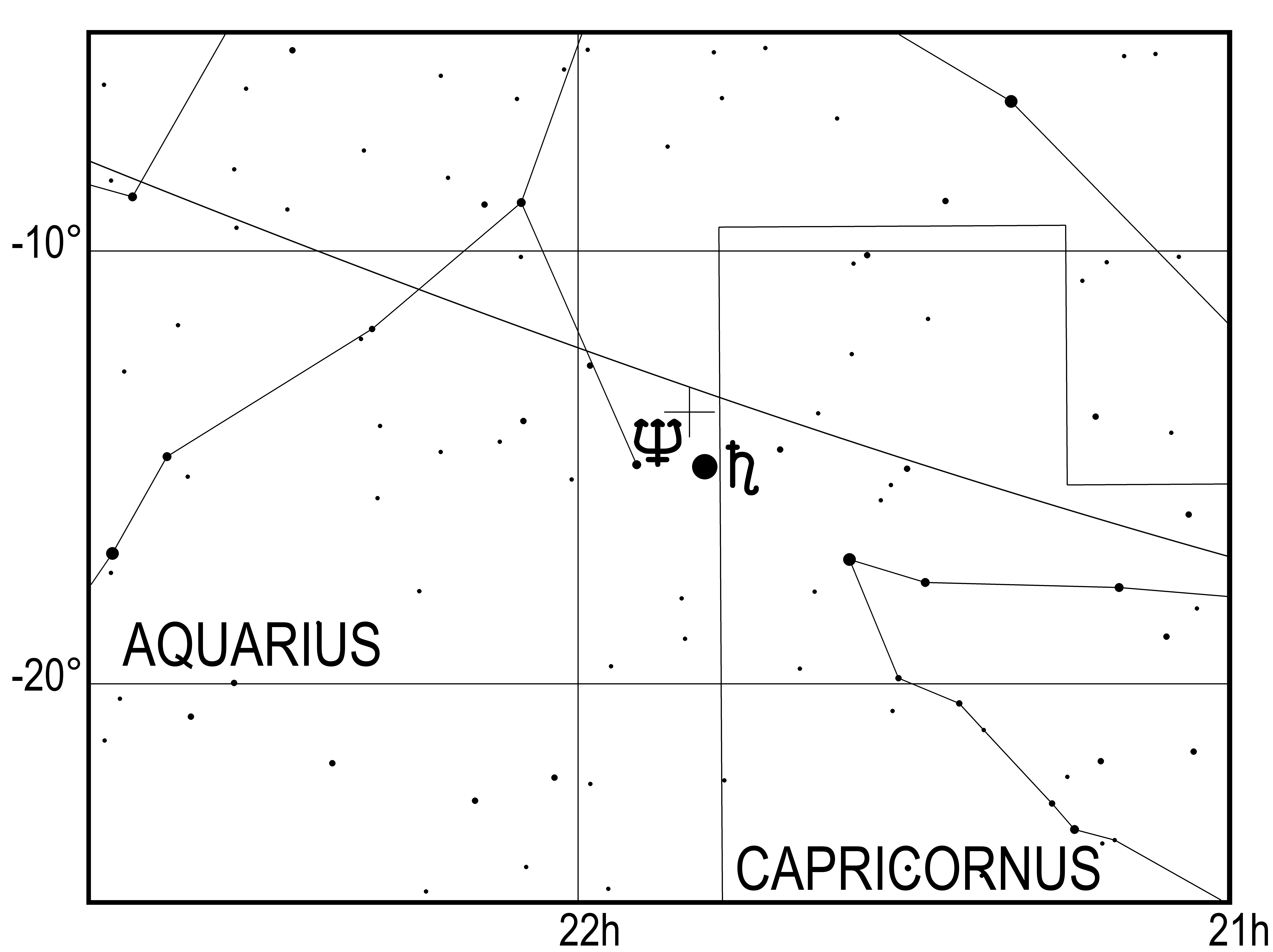
Position of Neptune (marked with a cross) on the date of its discovery, the September 23rd, 1846

Le Verrier was unaware that his public confirmation of Adams' private computations had set in motion a British search for the purported planet. On 31 August, Le Verrier presented a third memoir, now giving the mass and orbit of the new body. Having been unsuccessful in his efforts to interest any French astronomer in the problem, Le Verrier finally sent his results by post to Johann Gottfried Galle at the Berlin Observatory.

Galle received Le Verrier's letter in the morning of 23 September. Galle, an assistant at the Berlin Observatory, proceeded to ask the director of the observatory, Johann Franz Encke, to use their Fraunhofer telescope (aperture of 9 inches/24.4 cm). Encke celebrated his 55th birthday that day and permitted the use of the telescope. Galle's and Encke's conversation was overheard by Heinrich Louis d'Arrest, a student who was working at the observatory, who excitedly asked Galle for the permission to join the observations. Galle allowed d'Arrest to join and even asked him to conduct preparations. At first they followed Le Verrier's instructions to look for a disk on the sky but without success. They also used the standard sky chart but soon noticed that stars were missing from this sky chart. d'Arrest suggested that a recently published chart of the sky, Hora XXI, could be compared with the current sky to seek the displacement characteristic of a planet, as opposed to a stationary star. This map was part of a series, which was waiting for another map, which is why it was not distributed worldwide at this time. With the star map in their hands they returned to the Fraunhofer telescope. Galle was at the telescope reading the star positions while d'Arrest was sitting at a nearby table and checking the coordinates against the Hora XXI chart. It did not take long before d'Arrest exclaimed: "That star is not on the map!".

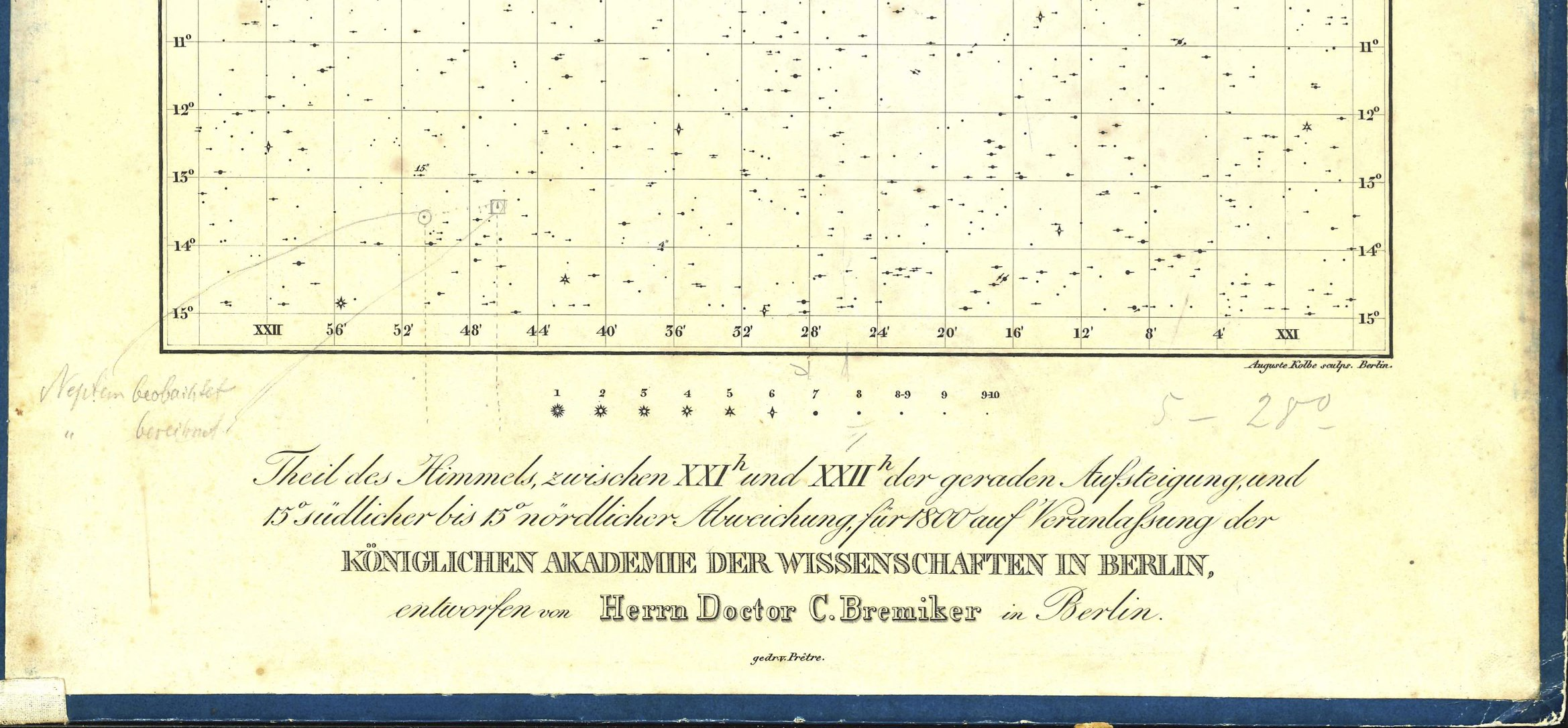
Excerpt from the Hora XXI sky chart of the Berlin Science Academy completed by Carl Bremiker. The predicted location (square) and the observed location (circle) were noted in pencil, allegedly by Galle, but at some time after the discovery.

The discovery was made thanks to the Hora XXI sky chart of the Berlin Science Academy completed by Carl Bremiker. Originally Bessel proposed a plan to create star charts to aid the discovery of comets and minor-planets. In this plan catalogues from Bradley, Lalande and Piazzi would be reduced according to a uniform scheme and collated with the zone catalogues within 15 degrees of the equator. The catalogued stars were to be supplemented by un-catalogued stars which could be seen in a 'comet-seeker'. Twenty four astronomers were to take part in the work, each taking an hour of right ascension. Work on the chart Hora XXI started in 1826, but was only completed in 1844 and printed in 1845.

Neptune was discovered just after midnight, after less than an hour of searching and less than 1 degree from the position Le Verrier had predicted, a remarkable match. After two further nights of observations in which its position and movement were verified, Galle replied to Le Verrier with astonishment: "the planet whose place you have [computed] really exists" (emphasis in original). The discovery telescope was an equatorial mounted achromatic refractor by Joseph Fraunhofer's firm Merz und Mahler.

== Aftermath ==
On the announcement of the discovery, Herschel, Challis, and Richard Sheepshanks, foreign secretary of the Royal Astronomical Society, announced that Adams had already calculated the planet's characteristics and position. Airy, at length, published an account of the circumstances, and Adams's memoir was printed as an appendix to the Nautical Almanac. However, it appears that the version published by Airy had been edited by the omission of a "crucial phase" to disguise the fact that Adams had quoted only mean longitude and not the orbital elements.

A keen controversy arose in France and England as to the merits of the two astronomers. There was much criticism of Airy in England. Adams was a diffident young man who was naturally reluctant to publish a result that would establish or ruin his career. Airy and Challis were criticised, particularly by James Glaisher, as failing to exercise their proper role as mentors of a young talent. Challis was contrite but Airy defended his own behaviour, claiming that the search for a planet was not the role of the Greenwich Observatory. On the whole, Airy has been defended by his biographers. In France the claims made for an unknown Englishman were resented as detracting from the credit due to Le Verrier's achievement.

The Royal Society awarded Le Verrier the Copley medal in 1846 for his achievement, without mention of Adams, but Adams's academic reputation at Cambridge, and in society, was assured. As the facts became known, some British astronomers pushed the view that the two astronomers had independently solved the problem of Neptune, and ascribed equal importance to each. But Adams himself publicly acknowledged Le Verrier's priority and credit (not forgetting to mention the role of Galle) in the paper that he gave to the Royal Astronomical Society in November 1846:

I mention these dates merely to show that my results were arrived at independently, and previously to the publication of those of M. Le Verrier, and not with the intention of interfering with his just claims to the honours of the discovery; for there is no doubt that his researches were first published to the world, and led to the actual discovery of the planet by Dr. Galle, so that the facts stated above cannot detract, in the slightest degree, from the credit due to M. Le Verrier.

— Adams (1846)

The criticism was soon afterwards made, that both Adams and Le Verrier had been over-optimistic in the precision they claimed for their calculations, and both had, by using Bode's law, greatly overestimated the planet's distance from the sun. Further, it was suggested that they both succeeded in getting the longitude almost right only because of a "fluke of orbital timing". This criticism was discussed in detail by Danjon (1946) who illustrated with a diagram and discussion that while hypothetical orbits calculated by both Le Verrier and Adams for the new planet were indeed of very different size on the whole from that of the real Neptune (and actually similar to each other), they were both much closer to the real Neptune over that crucial segment of orbit covering the interval of years for which the observations and calculations were made, than they were for the rest of the calculated orbits. So the fact that both the calculators used a much larger orbital major axis than the reality was shown to be not so important, and not the most relevant parameter.

The new planet, at first called "Le Verrier" by François Arago, received by consensus the neutral name of Neptune. Its mathematical prediction was a great intellectual feat, but it showed also that Newton's law of gravitation, which Airy had almost called in question, prevailed even at the limits of the Solar System.

Adams held no bitterness towards Challis or Airy and acknowledged his own failure to convince the astronomical world:

I could not expect however that practical astronomers, who were already fully occupied with important labours, would feel as much confidence in the results of my investigations, as I myself did.

By contrast, Le Verrier was arrogant and assertive, enabling the British scientific establishment to close ranks behind Adams while the French, in general, found little sympathy with Le Verrier. In 1874–1876, Adams was President of the Royal Astronomical Society when it fell to him to present the RAS Gold Medal of the year to Le Verrier.

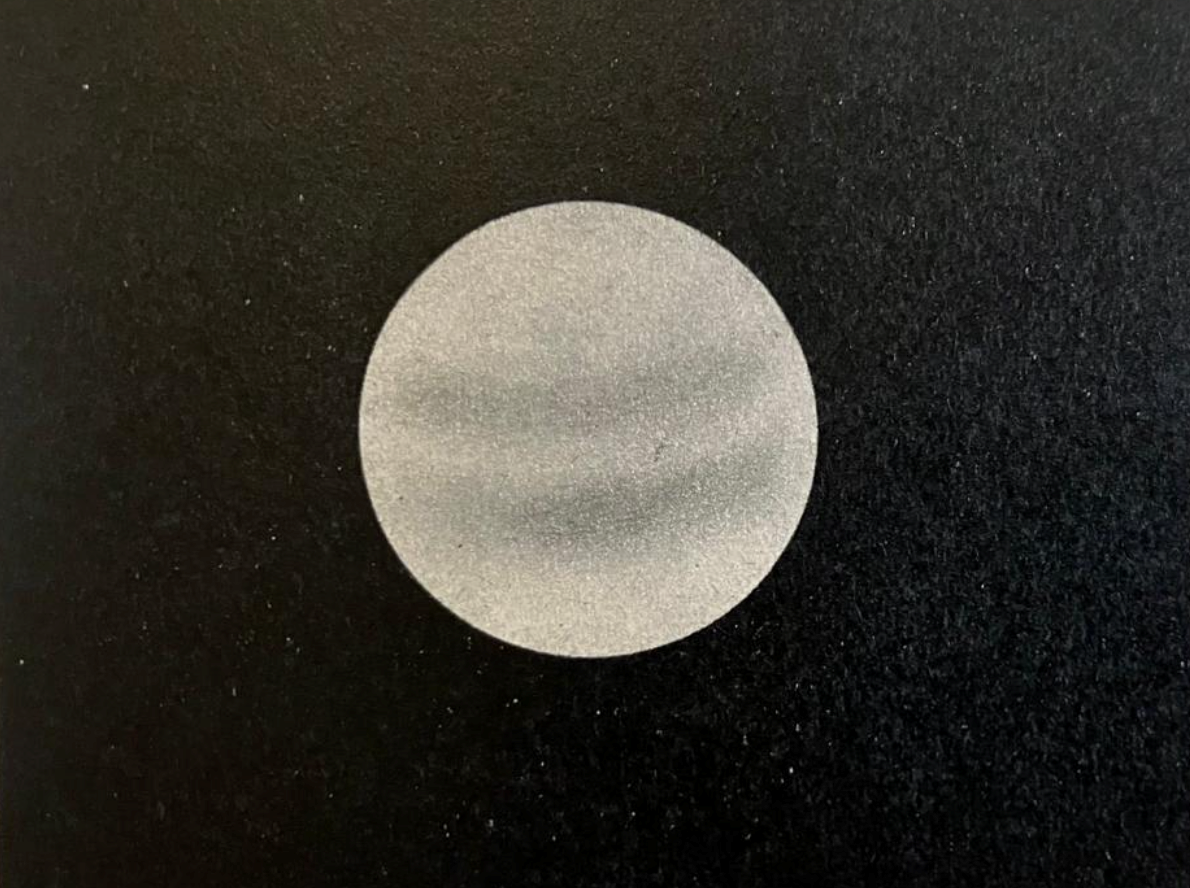
Neptune in 1919 (illustration) based on the observation by T.J. See

== Later analysis ==
The conventional wisdom that Neptune's discovery should be "credited to both Adams and Le Verrier" has recently been challenged putting in doubt the accounts of Airy, Challis and Adams in 1846.

In 1999, Adams's correspondence with Airy, which had been lost by the Royal Greenwich Observatory, was rediscovered in Chile among the possessions of astronomer Olin J. Eggen after his death. In an interview in 2003, historian Nicholas Kollerstrom concluded that Adams's claim to Neptune was far weaker than had been suggested, as he had vacillated repeatedly over the planet's exact location, with estimates ranging across 20 degrees of arc. Airy's role as the hidebound superior willfully ignoring the upstart young intellect was, according to Kollerstrom, largely constructed after the planet was found, in order to boost Adams's, and therefore Britain's, credit for the discovery. A later Scientific American article by Sheehan, Kollerstrom and Waff claimed more boldly "The Brits Stole Neptune" and concluded "The achievement was Le Verrier's alone."

== Beyond Neptune ==
Even before Neptune's discovery, some speculated that one planet alone was not enough to explain the discrepancy in Uranus' orbit. On 17 November 1834, the British amateur astronomer the Reverend Thomas John Hussey reported to Airy a conversation he had had with Bouvard. Hussey reported that when he suggested to Bouvard that the unusual motion of Uranus might be due to the gravitational influence of an undiscovered planet, Bouvard replied that the idea had occurred to him, and that he had corresponded with Peter Andreas Hansen, director of the Seeberg Observatory in Gotha, about the subject. Hansen's opinion was that a single body could not adequately explain the motion of Uranus, and postulated that two planets lay beyond Uranus.

In 1848, Jacques Babinet raised an objection to Le Verrier's calculations, claiming that Neptune's observed mass was smaller and its orbit larger than Le Verrier had initially predicted. He postulated, based largely on simple subtraction from Le Verrier's calculations, that another planet of roughly 12 Earth masses, which he named "Hyperion", must exist beyond Neptune. Le Verrier denounced Babinet's hypothesis, saying, "[There is] absolutely nothing by which one could determine the position of another planet, barring hypotheses in which imagination played too large a part."

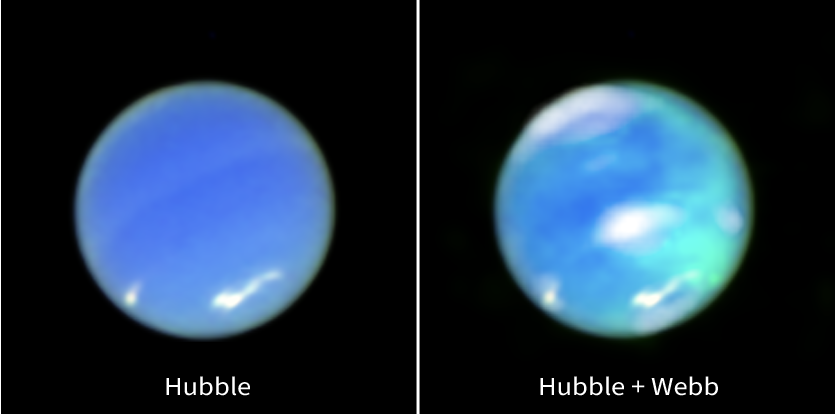
This image compares a color enhanced image of Neptune from the Hubble Space Telescope with the same image enhanced using data from the James Webb Space Telescope

As of 2026, no large planet has been found beyond Neptune that would explain any alleged discrepancy, despite the discovery of trans-Neptunian objects (most notably, Pluto). While the astronomical community widely agrees that "Planet X", as originally envisioned, does not exist, the concept of an as-yet-unobserved planet has been revived by a number of astronomers to explain other anomalies observed in the outer Solar System.

== Neptune discovery telescope ==
The telescope, at New Berlin Observatory (1835–1913), that discovered Neptune was an achromatic refractor with an aperture of 9 Paris inches (9.6 English inches, or 24.4 cm). Made by the late Joseph Fraunhofer's firm, Merz und Mahler, it was a high-performance telescope of its era, with one of the largest achromatic doublets available and a finely made equatorial mount, with a clock drive to move the 4 m (13.4′) main tube at the same rate as Earth's rotation. Eventually the telescope was moved to the Deutsches Museum in Munich, Germany, where it can still be seen as an exhibit.

== See also ==
- Planets beyond Neptune
- Planet Nine
- Vulcan

== Bibliography ==
- Airy, G.B. (1847). "Account of some circumstances historically connected with the discovery of the planet exterior to Uranus". Memoirs of the Royal Astronomical Society. 16: 385–414. Bibcode:1847MmRAS..16..385A.
- Airy, W., ed. (1896). The Autobiography of Sir George Biddell Airy. Cambridge University Press. from Project Gutenberg
- [Anon.] (2001) "Bouvard, Alexis", Encyclopædia Britannica, Deluxe CDROM edition
- Baum, R.; Sheehan, W. (1997). In Search of Planet Vulcan: The Ghost in Newton's Clockwork Universe. Plenum. ISBN 978-0-306-45567-4.
- Bouvard, Alexis (1821). Tables astronomiques publiees par le Bureau des Longitudes de France. Paris, FR: Bachelier. Bibcode:1821tapp.book.....B.
- Chambers, John; Mitton, Jacqueline (2014). From dust to life : the origin and evolution of our solar system. Princeton, New Jersey: Princeton University Press. ISBN 978-0-691-14522-8. OCLC 859181634.
- Chapman, A. (1988). "Private research and public duty: George Biddell Airy and the search for Neptune". Journal for the History of Astronomy. 19 (2): 121–139. Bibcode:1988JHA....19..121C. doi:10.1177/002182868801900204. S2CID 126074998.
- Dieke, S. (1970). "Heinrich Louis D' Arrest". Dictionary of Scientific Biography. Vol. 1. New York: Charles Scribner's Sons. pp. 295–296. ISBN 978-0-684-10114-9.
- Doggett, L. E. (1997). "Celestial mechanics". In Lankford, J. (ed.). History of Astronomy, an Encyclopedia. Taylor & Francis. pp. 131–140. ISBN 9780815303220.
- Dreyer, J.L.E.; Turner, H.H., eds. (1987) [1923]. History of the Royal Astronomical Society [1]: 1820–1920. Palo Alto, Calif: Reprinted for the Society by Blackwell Scientific Publications. pp. 161–162. ISBN 978-0-632-02175-8.
- Grosser, M. (1979) [1962]. The Discovery of Neptune. Dover Publications/Harvard University Press. ISBN 0-486-23726-5.
- Grosser, M. (1970). "Adams, John Couch". Dictionary of Scientific Biography. Vol. 1. New York: Charles Scribner's Sons. pp. 53–54. ISBN 978-0-684-10114-9.
- Harrison, H.M. (1994). Voyager in Time and Space: The Life of John Couch Adams, Cambridge Astronomer. Lewes: Book Guild, ISBN 0-86332-918-7
- Hughes, D.W. (1996). "J.C. Adams, Cambridge and Neptune". Notes and Records of the Royal Society. 50 (2): 245–248. doi:10.1098/rsnr.1996.0027. S2CID 146396595.
- Hutchins, R. (2004) "Adams, John Couch (1819–1892)", Oxford Dictionary of National Biography, Oxford University Press, accessed 23 August 2007 (subscription, Wikipedia Library access or UK public library membership required)
- J.W.L.G. [J.W.L. Glaisher] (March 1882). "James Challis". Monthly Notices of the Royal Astronomical Society. 43 (4): 160–179. Bibcode:1883MNRAS..43..160.. doi:10.1093/mnras/43.4.160.
- Kollerstrom, Nick (2001). "Neptune's Discovery. The British Case for Co-Prediction". Unuiversity College London. Archived from the original on 2005-11-11.
- Moore, P. (1996). The Planet Neptune: An Historical Survey before Voyager. Praxis. ISBN 978-0-471-96015-7.
- Nichol, J.P. (1855). The Planet Neptune: An Exposition and History. Edinburgh: James Nichol.
- O'Connor, J.J.; Robertson, E.F. (1996). "Mathematical discovery of planets". MacTutor History of Mathematics archive. University of St. Andrews.
- Rawlins, Dennis (1992). "The Neptune Conspiracy" (PDF). DIO, the International Journal of Scientific History. 2 (3): 115–142.
- Rawlins, Dennis (1994). "Theft of the Neptune papers" (PDF). DIO, the International Journal of Scientific History. 4 (2): 92–102. Bibcode:1994DIO.....4...92R.
- Rawlins, Dennis (1999). "British Neptune Disaster File Recovered" (PDF). DIO, the International Journal of Scientific History. 9 (1): 3–25.
- Sampson, R.A. (1904). "A description of Adams's manuscripts on the perturbations of Uranus". Memoirs of the Royal Astronomical Society. 54: 143–161. Bibcode:1904MmRAS..54..143S.
- Sheehan, W.; Baum, R. (September 1996). "Neptune's Discovery 150 Years Later". Astronomy. 24 (9): 42–49. Bibcode:1996Ast....24...42S.
- Sheehan, W.; Thurber, S. (2007). "John Couch Adams's Asperger syndrome and the British non-discovery of Neptune". Notes and Records of the Royal Society. 61 (3): 285–299. doi:10.1098/rsnr.2007.0187. S2CID 146702903.
- Sheehan, W; et al. (2004). "The Case of the Pilfered Planet — Did the British steal Neptune?". Scientific American. 291 (6): 92–99. doi:10.1038/scientificamerican1204-92. PMID 15597985.
- Smart, W.M. (1946). "John Couch Adams and the discovery of Neptune". Nature. 158 (4019): 648–652. Bibcode:1946Natur.158..648S. doi:10.1038/158648a0. S2CID 4074284.
- Smart, W.M. (1947). "John Couch Adams and the discovery of Neptune". Occasional Notes of the Royal Astronomical Society. 2: 33–88.
- Smith, R.W. (1989). "The Cambridge network in action: the discovery of Neptune". Isis. 80 (303): 395–422. doi:10.1086/355082. S2CID 144191212.
- Standage, T. (2000). The Neptune File. Penguin Press.
- Unknown (October 11, 1980). "Did Galileo See Neptune?". Science News. 118 (15): 231. doi:10.2307/3965133. JSTOR 3965133.
