= IC 4461 =

Galaxy in the constellation Boötes

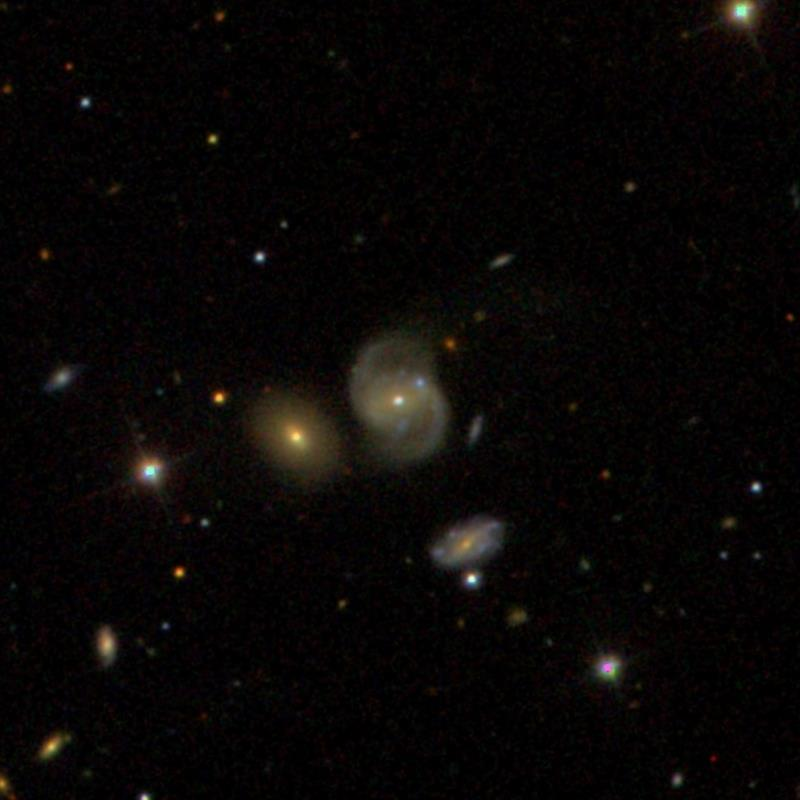

Observation data (J2000 epoch)
- Constellation: Boötes
- Right ascension: 14^{h} 35^{m} 01.88015^{s}
- Declination: +26° 32′ 38.4003″
- Redshift: 0.03070
- Heliocentric radial velocity: 9,118 km/s
- Distance: 417 Mly
- Apparent magnitude (V): 12.797 0.049

Characteristics
- Type: Sb

Other designations
- PGC 52119, 2MASX J14350187+2632378, UGC 9384, MCG+05-34-077, Z163-85, Arp 95

IC 4461 is a spiral galaxy located in the constellation Boötes, located at distance of 417 million light-years from both the Milky Way and Andromeda Galaxy.

The galaxy was first discovered by Stephane Javelle on June 22, 1895 who found it as a faint and round object. It is listed as PGC 52119 by Javelle. Together with IC 4462, they make up Arp 95 in the Atlas of Peculiar Galaxies, which they fall under galaxies with elliptical companions. IC 4461 is sometimes confused with another spiral galaxy PGC 52120, which lies at a much further distance of 855 million light-years.
