= Aymar de la Baume Pluvinel =

French astronomer (1860–1938)

Aymar Eugène de la Baume Pluvinel
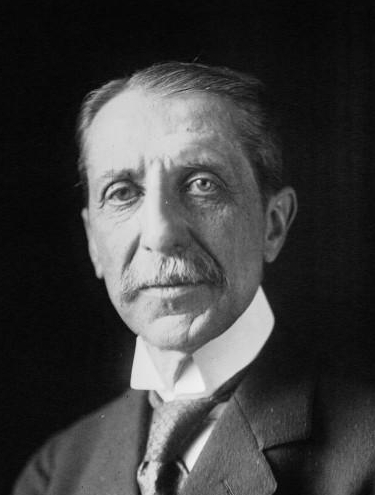
- Pluvinel in 1921
- Born: 6 November 1860
- Died: 18 July 1938 (aged 77)
- Awards: Valz Prize; Prix Jules Janssen
- Scientific career
- Fields: Astronomy

Count Aymar Eugène de la Baume Pluvinel (6 November 1860 – 18 July 1938) was a French astronomer and professor in the Grandes écoles SupOptique (École supérieure d'optique). He belonged to an old noble family, whose most famous descendant was Antoine de Pluvinel, King Louis XIII's master of equitation.

He was a pioneer of astrophotography on the French expedition to Haiti to observe the transit of Venus in 1882 and on several French expeditions to observer solar eclipses.

He was a member of the Société Astronomique de France from 1889 and its president from 1913 to 1919. He was awarded the Valz Prize in 1909 by the French Academy of Sciences. In 1923, he received the Prix Jules Janssen, the highest award of the Société astronomique de France, the French astronomical society.

Pluvinel at the Fourth Conference International Union for Cooperation in Solar Research at Mount Wilson Observatory, 1910
