= Valz Prize =

French astronomy prize

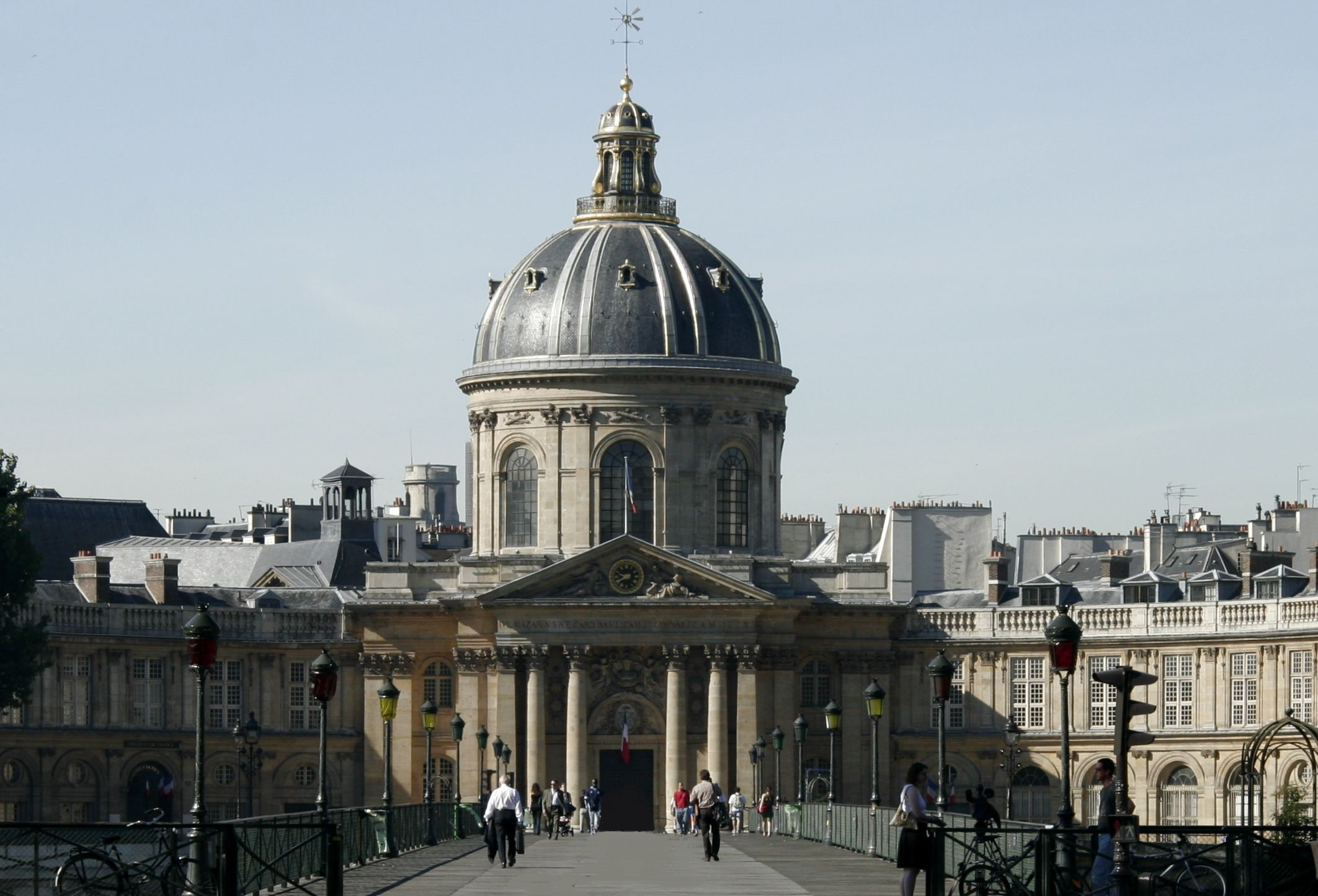
The Institut de France in Paris, home of the French Academy of Sciences.

The Valz Prize (Prix Valz) was awarded by the French Academy of Sciences, from 1877 through 1970, to honor advances in astronomy.

== History ==
The Valz Prize was established in June 1874 when the widow of astronomer Benjamin Valz, Marie Madeleine Julie Malhian, donated 10,000 francs to establish a prize in honor of her late husband. The Valz Prize was to be awarded for work of similar stature as that honored by the pre-existing Lalande Prize. The first Valz Prize was awarded in 1877 to brothers Paul and Prosper Henry, and was for the sum of 460 francs.

Save for 1924, the French Academy of Sciences awarded the Valz Prize annually from 1877 to 1943. After 1943, the prize was awarded only sporadically (only once per decade from 1950 to 1970). In 1970, the Valz Prize was combined with the Lalande Prize to create the Lalande-Valz Prize, which continued to be awarded through 1996. In 1997, that prize was combined with numerous other Academy prizes to create the Grande Médaille.

== List of Valz Prize winners ==
- 1877 – Paul Henry and Prosper Henry (joint award) – Charts to facilitate search for minor planets
- 1878 – Julius Schmidt – Selenographic work
- 1879 – Étienne Trouvelot – Work on Jupiter, Saturn, and Mars
- 1880 – Wilhelm Tempel – Discovery of twenty comets
- 1881 – David Gill – Work on the determination of the parallax of the Sun
- 1882 – William Huggins – Applications of photography to the study of the spectra of celestial bodies
- 1882 – Luiz Cruls – Spectral studies of the Great Comet of 1882
- 1883 – Édouard Jean-Marie Stephan – Discoveries of nebulae
- 1884 – Friedrich Karl Ginzel – Work on the eclipses of the Sun
- 1885 – Friedrich Wilhelm Gustav Spörer – Work on sunspots
- 1886 – Camille Guillaume Bigourdan – Research on the problem of personal error
- 1887 – Ernest Perigaud – Investigation of the meridian instruments of the Paris Observatory
- 1888 – Edward Charles Pickering – Photometric work on stellar magnitude
- 1889 – Auguste Charlois – Astronomical work on orbits of seven asteroids
- 1890 – S. de Glasenapp – Study on the double stars appearing in the Pulkovo Catalog
- 1891 – Hermann Carl Vogel – Research in spectroscopy
- 1892 – Pierre Puiseux – Entirety of his work, including that on the constant of aberration
- 1893 – Adolf Berberich – Calculations of orbits of double stars, comets, and planets
- 1894 – Jean Coniel – Calculations of asteroid orbits
- 1895 – William Frederick Denning – Work on meteors and discoveries of comets
- 1896 – Joseph Bossert – Catalog of 3,950 stars
- 1897 – Louis Fabry – Research on orbits of comets
- 1898 – Élie Colin – Research on astronomy and geodesy, especially latitude
- 1899 – Magnus Nyrén – Sidereal astronomy and observations on the meridian
- 1900 – Aloys Verschaffel – Meridian observations and catalog
- 1901 – Charles André – Treatise on Traite d'Astronomie Stellaire
- 1902 – Ernst Hartwig – Heliometer observations and work on variable stars
- 1903 – Alphonse Borrelly – Discoveries of comets
- 1904 – Campos Rodrigues – Determination of solar parallax by means of the asteroid Eros
- 1905 – Michel Giacobini – discovery of ten comets
- 1906 – Johann Palisa – Entirety of his astronomical research
- 1907 – Michel Giacobini – Astronomical work
- 1908 – Michel Luizet – Work on variable stars
- 1909 – Aymar de la Baume Pluvinel – Entirety of his astronomical work
- 1910 – Stéphane Javelle – Works on nebulae and comets
- 1911 – Charlemagne Rambaud – Astronomical work
- 1912 – Alexandre Schaumasse – Comet discoveries
- 1913 – Alfred Fowler – Work on the principal series of hydrogen lines
- 1914 – Pierre Salet – Research on polarization phenomena
- 1914 – Stanislas Chevalier – Research on the Sun
- 1915 – Armand Lambert – Work as an observer and in applied mathematics
- 1916 – Giovanni Boccardi – Research on variation of latitude; discovery of a sensible inequality in the semi-lunar period
- 1917 – Alexandre Schaumasse – Discovery of comet 1917b (C/1917 H1)
- 1918 – Frédéric Sy – Entirety of his astronomical work
- 1919 – Felix Boquet – Entirety of his scientific work
- 1920 – Ernest Maubant – Calculation of perturbations of Tempel-Swift Comet
- 1921 – Jean Trousset – Research on double stars, the errors of divided circles, and studies of Jupiter's moon, Pasiphae
- 1922 – Jean François Chazy – Papers on the three-body problem
- 1923 – Walter Sydney Adams – Work on Solar and stellar spectroscopy
- 1924 – no award
- 1925 – Vojislav Michkovitch (or Vojislav Mišković) – Work on Stellar statistics
- 1926 – Frank Schlesinger – Astronomical work, especially for work on the stellar parallax
- 1927 – Lucien d'Azambuja – Work on sunspots, solar flares, and the solar chromosphere
- 1928 – George Van Biesbroeck – Entirety of his astronomical work
- 1929 – Louis Dominique Joseph Armand Dunoyer de Segonzac – Research on spirit levels and on photoelectric cells
- 1930 – Gilbert Rougier – Work on photoelectric cells
- 1931 – Henri Chretien – Invention of the anamorphic lens
- 1932 – Jean Dufay – Work on astronomical photometry
- 1933 – Henri Labrouste – Research into periodic solar phenomena
- 1934 – Ferdinand Quenisset – Observations on comets
- 1935 – Raymond Tremblot – For the entirety of his astronomical work
- 1936 – André Couder – Work on optical instruments
- 1937 – Maurice Burgaud – Work in Shanghai, China on terrestrial magnetism
- 1938 – Pierre Lacroute – Work in physical astronomy
- 1938 – Rene Bernard – Work in "the light of the night sky"
- 1940 – Jeanne Clavier – Work on a photographic map of the heavens
- 1941 – Junior Gauzit – Research in physical astronomy
- 1942 – Jean Rösch – Work in physical astronomy
- 1943 – Rose Sainturier (née Rose Bonnet) – Work on double stars
- 1944-1945 – Not awarded
- 1946 – Raoul Goudey – Work on gravity
- 1947-1948 – Not awarded
- 1949 – Jean Delhaye – Work in stellar statistics
- 1950-1958 – Not awarded
- 1959 – Fernan Nahon – Work on stellar statistics and dynamics
- 1960-1968 – Not awarded (Note: No documentation can be found for 1966 and 1967.)
- 1969 – André Baranne – Work on optical astronomy
- 1970 – Not awarded

== See also ==
- List of astronomy awards
