= Joseph Bossert =

French astronomer

Joseph François Bossert
- Born: November 30, 1851; Blandy, Seine-et-Marne
- Died: June 21, 1906 (aged 54)
- Scientific career
- Fields: astronomy

Joseph François Bossert (30 November 1851 – 21 June 1906) was a French astronomer.

Bossert began study at age fifteen at the Paris Observatory. He calculated the orbits of asteroids and comets. He was the main author of three star catalogues:

- Catalogue de 3950 étoiles dont les coordononnés moyennes sont ramenées à l'équinoxe de 1800,0 (1892)
- Catalogue des movements propres de 2641 étoiles (1895)
- Catalogue des étoiles brillantes destiné aux astronomes, voyaguers, ingénieurs et marins (1906)

He was also one of the main contributors to the Astrographic Catalogue project initiated by Mouchez in 1887.

Bossert won the Lalande Prize of the French Academy of Sciences in 1888 and the Valz Prize in 1896.
