= 444 Gyptis =

Main-belt asteroid

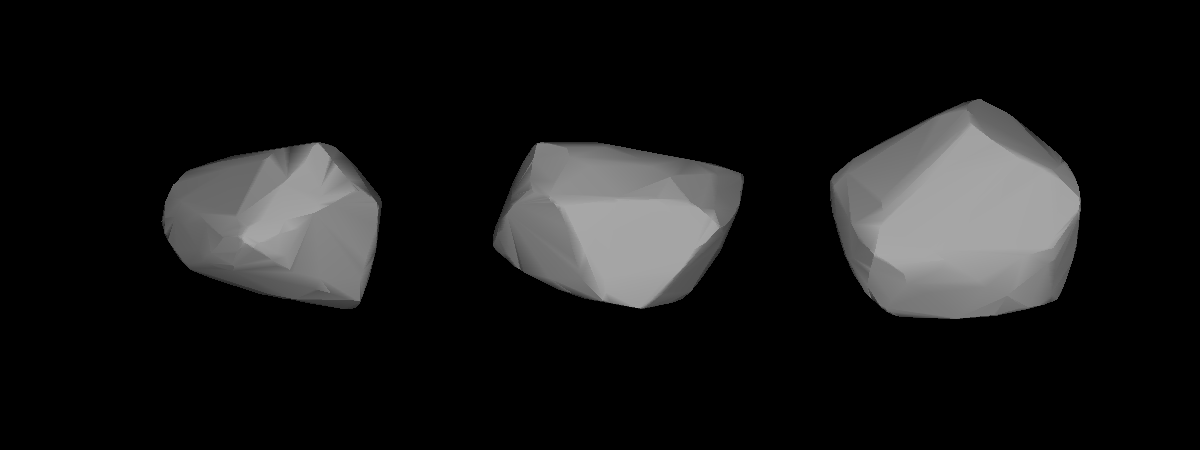
- Lightcurve-base 3D-model of 444 Gyptis.

Discovery
- Discovered by: Jérôme Eugène Coggia
- Discovery date: 31 March 1899

Designations
- Pronunciation: /ˈdʒɪptɪs/
- Named after: Gyptis
- Alternative designations: 1899 EL
- Minor planet category: Main belt
- Adjectives: Gyptidian

Orbital characteristics
- Epoch 31 July 2016 (JD 2457600.5)
- Uncertainty parameter 0
- Observation arc: 116.54 yr (42568 d)
- Aphelion: 3.25674 AU (487.201 Gm)
- Perihelion: 2.28337 AU (341.587 Gm)
- Semi-major axis: 2.77005 AU (414.394 Gm)
- Eccentricity: 0.17569
- Orbital period (sidereal): 4.61 yr (1684.0 d)
- Mean anomaly: 11.8852°
- Mean motion: 0° 12^{m} 49.615^{s} / day
- Inclination: 10.2775°
- Longitude of ascending node: 195.716°
- Argument of perihelion: 154.984°

Physical characteristics
- Dimensions: 179×150 km
- Mean diameter: 164.63±2.60 km (composite estimate); 159.331±0.490 km
- Mass: (1.06±0.28)×10^{19} kg (composite estimate) (2.61±0.36)×10^{18} kg (Note: Calculated from its standard gravitational parameter GM = 0.174±0.024 km^{3}/s^{2}.)
- Mean density: 4.55±1.23 g/cm^{3} 1.23 g/cm^{3} (Note: Assuming a diameter of 159 km.)
- Synodic rotation period: 6.214 h (0.2589 d)
- Geometric albedo: 0.051±0.008
- Spectral type: C
- Absolute magnitude (H): 8.07

444 Gyptis is a main-belt asteroid that was discovered by French astronomer Jérôme Eugène Coggia on March 31, 1899, in Marseille. It is orbiting the Sun at a distance of 2.77 AU with a moderate eccentricity of 0.176 and an orbital period of 4.61 years. The orbital plane is inclined at an angle of 10.3°. It is spinning with a rotation period of 6.214 hours.

This is classified as a C-type asteroid and is probably composed of carbonaceous material. The spectra of the asteroid displays evidence of aqueous alteration. In 2004, Kochetova estimated Gyptis to have a mass of 1.25×10^{19} kg with a high density of 5.53±1.46 g/cm^{3}. In 2012 Carry estimated the mass as (1.06±0.28)×10^{19} kg with a high density of 4.55±1.23 g/cm^{3}.

The adaptive optics instrument at the W. M. Keck Observatory showed an object with a diameter of 129 km, which is much smaller than the estimate of 160 km from the IRAS observatory measurements, indicating an irregular shape. The size ratio between the major and minor axes is estimated at 1.40. Observations of an occultation on October 14, 2007, produced six chords indicating a cross-section ellipsoid of 179×150 km.

Between 1990 and 2021, 444 Gyptis has been observed to occult 17 stars.
