= Louis Dunoyer de Segonzac =

French physicist

Louis Dominique Joseph Armand Dunoyer de Segonzac (14 November 1880 – 27 August 1963) was a French physicist. He was awarded the Valz Prize by the French Academy of Sciences in 1929 for research on spirit levels and on photoelectric cells as applied to astronomy.

== Honors and awards ==
Knight of the Order of Legion of Honour
