= Lucien Henri d'Azambuja =

French solar astronomer (1884–1970)

Lucien d'Azambuja
- Born: Lucien Henri d'Azambuja; 28 January 1884; Paris, France
- Died: 18 July 1970 (aged 86); Salies-de-Béarn, Pyrénées-Atlantiques, France
- Education: University of Paris
- Known for: Cartes synoptiques de la chromosphère Systematic solar observations at Meudon
- Spouse: Marguerite d'Azambuja
- Awards: Lalande Prize (1915, 1935); Janssen Medal (1943); Prix Jules Janssen (1948); Officer of the Legion of Honour
- Scientific career
- Fields: Astronomy
- Workplaces: Meudon Observatory
- Thesis: Recherches sur la structure de la chromosphère solaire (1930)

Lucien Henri d'Azambuja (28 January 1884, Paris – 18 July 1970, Salies-de-Béarn) was a French astronomer who specialised in the study of the Sun. He spent his entire career at the Meudon observatory, where he organised the systematic programme of solar observations and compiled the Cartes synoptiques de la chromosphère.

== Biography ==
D'Azambuja was born in the 10th arrondissement of Paris on 28 January 1884. The death of his father, a physician, obliged him to break off his schooling and take employment; recommended to Henri Deslandres by one of his teachers, he entered the Meudon observatory on 24 April 1899 at the age of fifteen, when its staff numbered only five people. He was mobilised from 4 August 1914 to 10 March 1919 and was slightly wounded in Lorraine, obtaining his licence ès sciences in March 1920.

== Solar research ==
Working with Deslandres, d'Azambuja helped to construct the large spectroheliograph at Meudon.

Systematic observations of the full solar disc in the Ca II K line of singly ionised calcium began in 1908 and were joined in 1909 by observations in Hα. The observing service was organised by d'Azambuja and has continued to the present day, producing one of the longest available collections of solar images. On his return to Meudon after the war he began to compile the Cartes synoptiques de la chromosphère, carrying out the daily observations and their analysis alone for several years until he was assisted from 1926 by Grenat and by Marguerite Roumens, whom he married on 4 July 1935.

He presented his doctoral thesis, Recherches sur la structure de la chromosphère solaire, at the Sorbonne in 1930, using the large seven-metre spectroheliograph for the research. Together with his wife, he published an extensive memoir in 1948 on solar filaments and prominences, based on the Meudon spectroheliograms.

== Positions and honours ==
D'Azambuja was appointed aide-astronome on 1 January 1908, astronome adjoint on 1 January 1928 and astronome titulaire on 1 March 1938. After the First World War, he was responsible for the daily running of the Meudon observatory, a responsibility that was raised to an implicitly acknowledged quasi-directorship after Deslandres left in 1929. At the General Assembly of the International Astronomical Union held at Cambridge, Massachusetts, in 1932 he was appointed president of the Commission on Chromospheric Phenomena, a position he relinquished only in 1958, and he also presided over the Mixed Commission on Solar-Terrestrial Relations from its creation until the end of his career.

He served as president of the Société astronomique de France from 1950 to 1952 and was an Officer of the Legion of Honour.

The French Academy of Sciences awarded him the Lalande Prize in 1915, when he was an assistant astronomer at Meudon, for his contribution to the daily recording of the upper solar atmosphere and to the recognition of the effect of magnetic fields on band spectra. It awarded him the Valz Prize in 1927 for his work on sunspots, solar prominences and the solar chromosphere, the Lalande Prize a second time in 1935 for his work as a whole, and its Janssen Medal in 1943 for his work on the Sun. In 1948 he received the Prix Jules Janssen, the highest award of the Société astronomique de France.

== Later life ==
D'Azambuja reached retirement age on 1 October 1954 while his wife was still in post, and continued to work until the two of them left the observatory in 1959. He prepared a second edition of Georges Bruhat's book Le Soleil, published by the Presses universitaires de France in 1951.

== Death ==
D'Azambuja died at Salies-de-Béarn in the Pyrénées-Atlantiques on 18 July 1970.
