= C/1874 H1 (Coggia) =

Great Comet of 1874

C/1874 H1 (Coggia) (Great Comet of 1874)
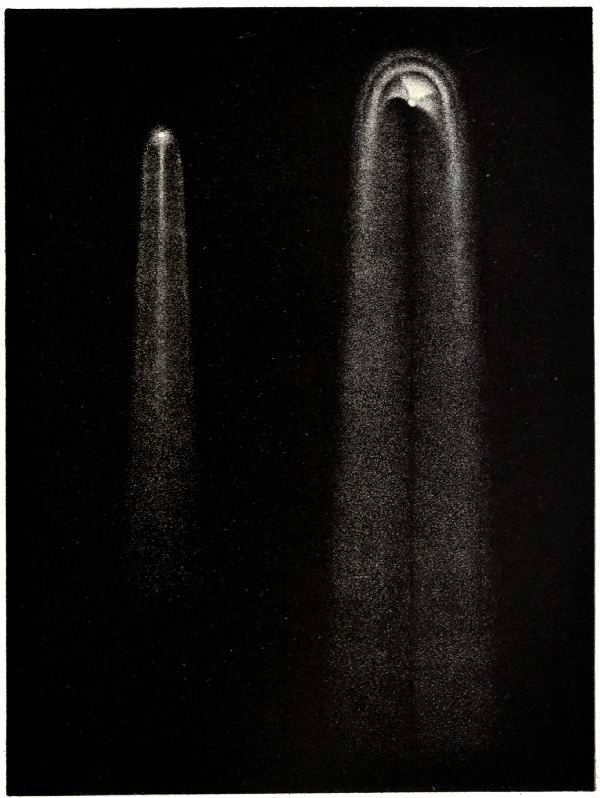
- Drawing of Coggia's Comet as seen between 10 June and 9 July 1874.

Discovery
- Discovered by: Jérôme Eugène Coggia
- Discovery site: Marseille Observatory
- Discovery date: 17 April 1874

Designations
- Alternative designations: 1874 III, 1874c

Orbital characteristics
- Epoch: 16 July 1874 (JD 2405720.5)
- Observation arc: 185 days
- Number of observations: 638
- Aphelion: ~620 AU (inbound); ~1,100 AU (outbound)
- Perihelion: 0.676 AU
- Semi-major axis: ~312 AU (inbound); ~551 AU (outbound)
- Eccentricity: 0.99882
- Orbital period: ~5,510 years (inbound); ~12,950 years (outbound)
- Inclination: 66.344°
- Longitude of ascending node: 120.49°
- Argument of periapsis: 152.38°
- Mean anomaly: 0.0005°
- Last perihelion: 9 July 1874
- T_{Jupiter}: 0.418

Physical characteristics
- Synodic rotation period: 9.2 hours
- Comet total magnitude (M1): 5.7
- Apparent magnitude: 0.0–1.0 (1874 apparition)

C/1874 H1 (Coggia) is a non-periodic comet, which in the summer of 1874 could be seen by the naked eye. On the basis of its brightness, the comet has been called the Great Comet of 1874; on July 13 of that year its apparent magnitude peaked at between 0 and 1.

== Discovery and observations ==
The astronomer Jérôme Eugène Coggia discovered this comet on 17 April 1874 at the Marseille Observatory. During the remainder of April and in May the comet was closely observed by many astronomers, including Winnecke in Straßburg, Tempel in Arcetri, Rayet in Paris, Schulhof in Vienna, Rümker in Hamburg, Schmidt in Athens, Bruhns in Leipzig, Christie in Greenwich and Dreyer in Copenhagen. In mid-May telescopes revealed the development of a faint tail.

In early June the comet became visible to the naked eye and by the end of June its brightness reached magnitude 4. By the beginning of July the tail had grown to 6° and by the 16th of July to 45°. The tail was straight and narrow, stretching across from 1° to 2° of the sky at the tail's end.

According to David A. J. Seargent,

"Without doubt, C/1874 H1 (Coggia) was a beauty; a true great comet. At its brightest, it probably exceeded the first magnitude and displayed a series of envelopes within its coma that astronomers compared with Donati's Comet 16 years earlier. Suitably placed observers also noted maximum naked-eye tail lengths reaching 70 degrees as the comet passed near Earth in July."

From 16 July to 23 July, the comet accelerated and moved rapidly southward in the observer's sky, making the comet more difficult to observe in the northern hemisphere. Reports indicate that the tail length was about 60° to 70°; the tail was at least 63°. On 23 July in Athens, Schmidt made the last observation of the comet from the northern hemisphere.

On July 27, the comet became visible in the southern hemisphere, (Note: July 26.—Coggia's comet first seen in Victoria from Wilson's Promontory, Point Lonsdale, and the suburbs of Melbourne.) with observations made in South Africa and by Robert L. J. Ellery in Australia. According to a newspaper report from pre-dawn observations by H. C. Russell on July 29, "The nucleus was as bright as a first magnitude star, and the head about half the diameter of the moon." John Tebbutt in Windsor, New South Wales made observations of the comet from 1 August to 7 October. On 19 October, John M. Thome at Córdoba, Argentina made the last observation of Comet Coggia.

== Undulations in the tail ==
On the evening of July 21 with a first quarter moon and a very clear sky, Trouvelot observed undulations in the comet's tail. Trouvelot wrote that he "... saw the comet's tail shortening and extending, lightening up and extinguishing like the rays of certain auroras. Extended undulations, rapid vibrations, ran along it in succession from the horizon to its extremity, giving it the appearance of a fine gauze wavering in a strong breeze. The pulsations and waves of light were of unequal duration; some being rapid, while others lasted a longer time. For over one hour, the comet's tail kindled and extinguished more than one hundred times; the extinction being sometimes so complete that it was impossible to see any trace of the comet; while sometimes it became so bright that, in spite of the light of the moon, it could be distinguished easily in all its contours, even to its very extremity, which was then a little to the south of γ Ursa Minoris..."

== Scientific analysis ==
From May to July 1874, Huggins, Secchi, Lockyer, Rayet and Wolf made spectrographic observations of the comet. At first only a continuum was found, but by mid-June the three typical comet spectral bands were found. According to Huggins, Comet Coggia was "the first bright comet which has appeared since the spectroscope has become an instrument of scientific research."

== Orbit ==
Using 638 observations of Comet Coggia made over a period of 185 days, Josef von Hepperger in 1882 calculated an elliptical orbit inclined about 66° to the ecliptic. On 9 July 1874, the comet reached perihelion at about 0.676 AU (101.1 million km) from the Sun. On 23 July, the comet made its closest approach to planet Earth at about 0.29 AU (43 million km).

== Literature ==
Gerard Manley Hopkins wrote on 13 July 1874 a journal entry concerning Coggia's comet.

The public scare regarding the comet was satirized by Mark Twain in his short story "A Curious Pleasure Excursion."

The comet was observed by members of the 1874 Black Hills Expedition to South Dakota, which was led by Lt. Col. George Armstrong Custer. It was observed for 3 or 4 days by white and Native American members of the expedition ending July 2. Accounts of the observations were included in the diary of James Calhoun and in a newspaper article in the New York World. Lieutenant Calhoun was Custer's brother-in-law and acting adjutant on the expedition and later died at the Little Big Horn.
