= Maurice Hamy =

French astronomer (1861–1936)

Hamy at the Fourth Conference International Union for Cooperation in Solar Research at Mount Wilson Observatory, 1910

Maurice Théodore Adolphe Hamy (31 October 1861, Boulogne-sur-Mer – 9 April 1936, Paris) was a French astronomer.

He obtained in 1887 a doctorate from the Faculté des sciences de Paris with dissertation Étude sur la figure des corps célestes. In the 1890s he applied his method of interference fringes to an analysis of errors made in astronomical observations using meridian circles. He used his interference method to confirm Barnard's measurement of the apparent diameter of Venus. Hamy participated in the creation of l'Institut d'optique théorique et appliquée (SupOptique).

He won the prix Lalande in 1895. Filling the empty chair created by the death of Jules Janssen, Hamy was elected in 1908 a member of l'Académie des sciences and then in 1928 its president. He was also elected a member of the Bureau des longitudes.

He is a nephew of Ernest Hamy.
