= Louis Thollon =

French astronomer (1829–1887)

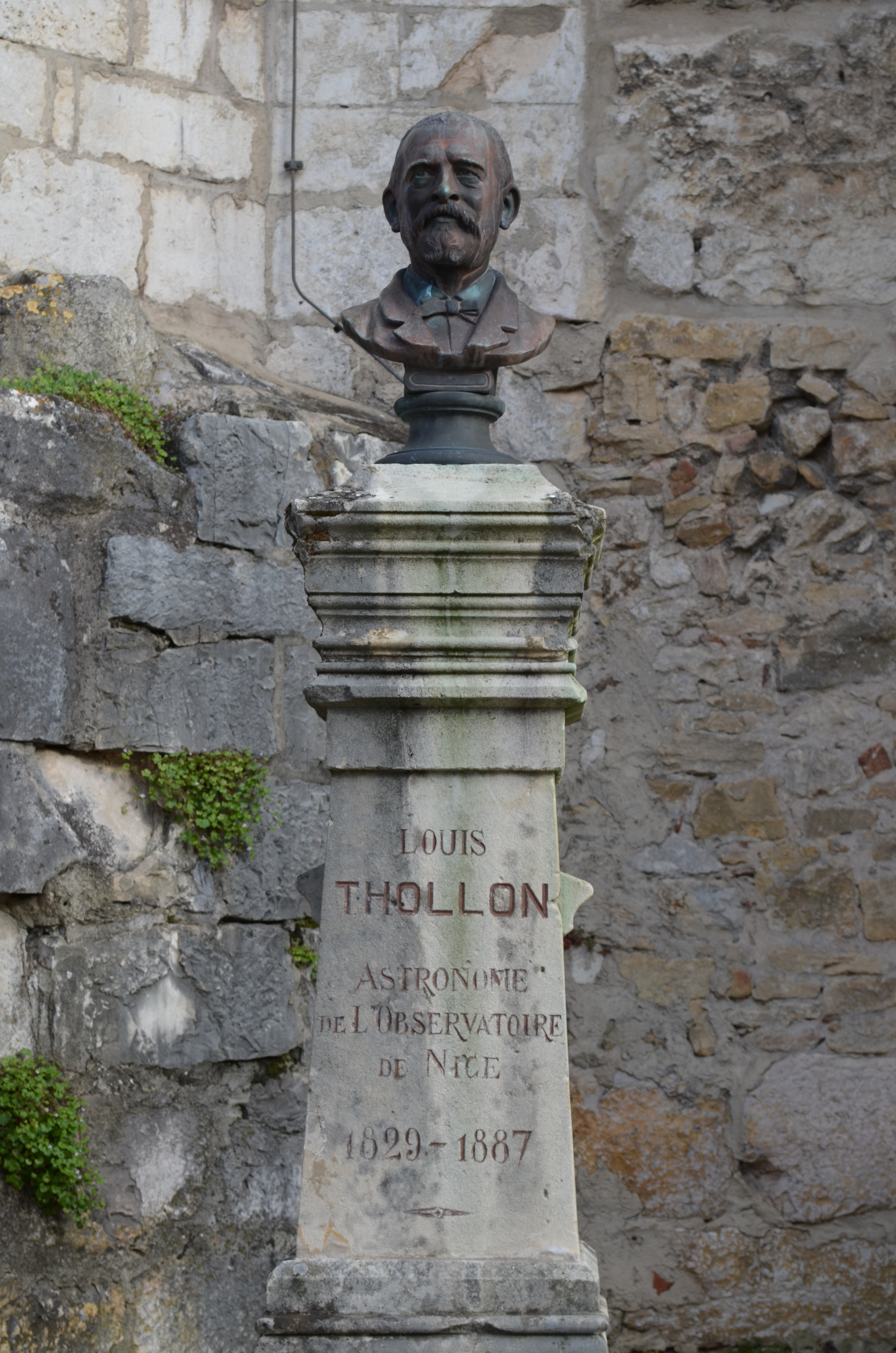

Louis Thollon (2 May 1829 – 8 April 1887) was a French astronomer.

He was born in Ambronay, France. Beginning in 1881, Thollon joined the staff of the new Nice Observatory where he undertook a long-term observation program of the Sun using a spectroscope of his own design. In the process, he recorded a solar spectrum consisting of 3,000 absorption lines in the optical band.

In 1882, he joined André Puiseux on an expedition to Egypt to observe the solar eclipse on 17 May. The same year he traveled to Portugal to watch the Venus transit, but was met with disappointment due to poor weather. He was awarded the Prix Lalande in 1885 for his large map of the Solar System, which was not published until after his death in 1890. During the 1886 Mars opposition, he assisted the observatory director, Henri Perrotin, in observing the planet with a 15 in (38 cm) reflecting telescope. Both men reported that they spotted canali on the surface of the planet, apparently confirming the 1877 discovery of these features by Italian astronomer Giovanni Schiaparelli. Thollon died at age 57 in Lyon, France.
