= John M. Thome =

American-Argentine astronomer

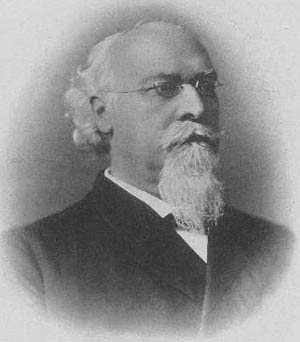
John Macon Thome

John Macon Thome (August 22, 1843 – September 27, 1908) was an American-Argentine astronomer. Some sources say John Macom Thome. He is sometimes known as Juan M. Thome.

He was born in Palmyra, Pennsylvania, and attended Lehigh University.

He came to the Argentine National Observatory (today Observatorio Astronómico de Córdoba) in 1870, working as the senior assistant of the director Benjamin A. Gould. He succeeded Gould as director in 1885.

Under his initiative, the Cordoba Durchmusterung star catalogue began to be compiled in 1892, although he did not live to see its completion.

He won the Lalande Prize for astronomy from the French Academy of Sciences in 1901. Thome died in Córdoba and was succeeded as director of the observatory by Charles Dillon Perrine.
