= Carl Bremiker =

German astronomer and geodesist

Carl Bremiker (23 February 1804, Hagen, Westphalia – 26 March 1877, Berlin) was a German astronomer and geodesist.

First educated as a surveyor, Bremiker worked on the Rhenish-Westphalia survey until 1835. He earned a doctorate and was an assistant to Johann Franz Encke. On 26 October 1840 Bremiker discovered a comet, which is now designated as C/1840 U1 (Bremiker). For this discovery he won the Lalande Prize in 1840. He made entries and revisions for five of the star charts of the Berlin Academy and collaborated on the Berliner Astronomisches Jahrbuch.

In 1852 Bremiker published a new edition of Baron Jurij Vega's Thesaurus Logarithmorum Completus (a famous table of logarithms). The new table was published in Latin under the title Logarithmorum VI decimalium nova tabula berolinensis, auctore Carola Bremiker. In 1860 the table was published in German under the title Logarithmisch-trigonometrische Tafeln mit sechs Decimalstellen bearbeitet. Bremiker’s table went through dozens of editions in German and English. He was from 1850 to 1877 an editor for the Nautisches Jahrbuch and also an editor for the French Annuaire nautique. Bremiker was an Inspector of the Plan Room in the Prussian Ministry of Trade. From 1868 he was the Departmental Director of the Royal Prussian Geodetical Institute.

== Sources ==
- Ernst Milkutat (1955). "Bremiker, Carl". Neue Deutsche Biographie (in German). Vol. 2. Berlin: Duncker & Humblot. pp. 582–582. (full text online).
