= 217 Eudora =

Main-belt asteroid

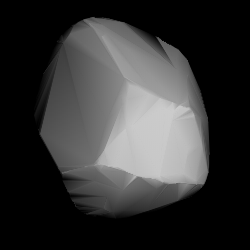
- 3D model based on lightcurve data

Discovery
- Discovered by: J. Coggia
- Discovery date: 30 August 1880

Designations
- Pronunciation: /juːˈdɔːrə/
- Named after: Eudora
- Alternative designations: A880 QA, 1914 RA
- Minor planet category: Main belt

Orbital characteristics
- Epoch 31 July 2016 (JD 2457600.5)
- Uncertainty parameter 0
- Observation arc: 130.48 yr (47657 d)
- Aphelion: 3.75541 AU (561.801 Gm)
- Perihelion: 1.98080 AU (296.323 Gm)
- Semi-major axis: 2.86811 AU (429.063 Gm)
- Eccentricity: 0.30937
- Orbital period (sidereal): 4.86 yr (1774.2 d)
- Average orbital speed: 17.57 km/s
- Mean anomaly: 349.290°
- Mean motion: 0° 12^{m} 10.49^{s} / day
- Inclination: 10.5165°
- Longitude of ascending node: 162.594°
- Argument of perihelion: 155.320°

Physical characteristics
- Dimensions: 68.62 ± 1.41 km (composite estimate); 66.24±2.3 km
- Mass: (1.65±0.75)×10^{17} kg (Note: Calculated from its standard gravitational parameter GM = 0.011±0.005 km^{3}/s^{2}.)
- Mean density: 1.13 g/cm^{3} (Note: Assuming a diameter of 65.4 km.)
- Synodic rotation period: 25.272 h (1.0530 d); 25.253 ± 0.003 hr
- Geometric albedo: 0.0484±0.004
- Spectral type: C
- Absolute magnitude (H): 9.80

217 Eudora is a large main belt asteroid. It was discovered by French (Corsican) astronomer Jérôme Eugène Coggia on August 30, 1880, in Marseille, France. It was his fourth asteroid discovery and is probably named after Eudora, one of the Hyades in Greek mythology.

It probably has a composition similar to carbonaceous chondrites. In 2007, a study showed it rotates every 25.253 ± 0.003 hours, based on lightcurve data. A light curve generated from photometric observations at Pulkovo Observatory, give a matching rotation period of 25.253 ± 0.002 hours and a brightness variation of 0.22 ± 0.04 in magnitude.

== See also ==
- List of minor planets: 1–1000
