= Jérôme Eugène Coggia =

French astronomer (1849–1919)

Minor planets discovered: 5
96 Aegle	17 February 1868	MPC
187 Lamberta	11 April 1878	MPC
193 Ambrosia	28 February 1879	MPC
217 Eudora	30 August 1880	MPC
444 Gyptis	31 March 1899	MPC

Jérôme Eugène Coggia (18 February 1849 – 15 January 1919) was a 19th-century French astronomer and discoverer of asteroids and comets, who was born in the Corsican town of Ajaccio.

Working at the Marseille Observatory from 1866 to 1917, Coggia discovered a number of comets, including the bright "Coggia's Comet" (C/1874 H1). The periodic comet 27P/Crommelin was previously called "Comet Pons-Coggia-Winnecke-Forbes". He is also credited by the Minor Planet Center with the discovery of 5 asteroids at Marseille between 1868 and 1899.

Coggia was awarded by the French Academy of Sciences its Lalande Prize for 1873 and again for 1916.

== Comets discovered or co-discovered ==
- C/1870 Q1 (Coggia)
- 27P/Crommelin
- C/1874 H1 (Coggia)
- C/1874 Q1 (Coggia)
- C/1877 R1 (Coggia)
- C/1890 O1 (Coggia)
