= Stéphane Javelle =

French astronomer (1864–1917)

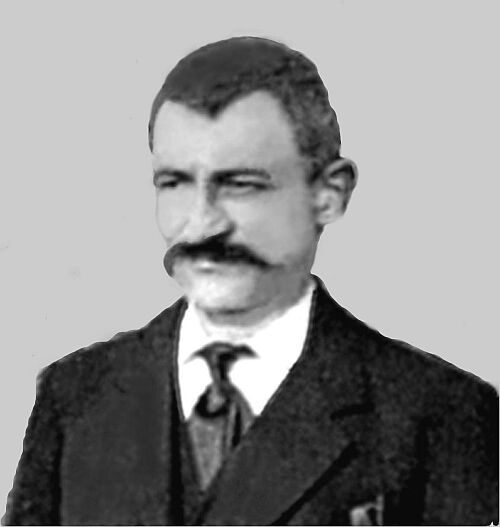
Stéphane Javelle

Stéphane Javelle (Lyon, 16 November 1864 – 3 August 1917) was a French astronomer. Since 1888 he worked assisting Henri Perrotin at the Nice Observatory, and observed 1431 objects published in the Index Catalogue. He initially worked as an accountant before his employer's friend, Louis Thollon recommended him to Perrotin. He was awarded the Valz Prize in 1910 by the French Academy of Sciences.
