= Mayhew (name) =

Mayhew is a surname of English, Norman French or biblical origins. It is also sometimes a given name. Notable people with the name include:

== Surname ==
=== People ===
- Abby Shaw Mayhew (1864–1954), American physical educator
- Augustus Mayhew (1826–1875), English journalist and author
- Christopher Mayhew (1915–1997), British politician
- Cicely Mayhew (1924–2016), British diplomat
- Clarence W. W. Mayhew (1906–1994), American architect
- David R. Mayhew (born 1937), American political scientist
- David Mayhew (racing driver) (born 1982), American racing driver
- Diane Youdale Mayhew (born 1970), English television personality
- Donna Mayhew (born 1960), American javelin thrower
- Edward Mayhew (1569–1625), English Benedictine
- Experience Mayhew (1673–1758), New England missionary
- Gerry Mayhew (born 1969), British air marshal
- Helen Mayhew, British radio presenter and producer
- Henry Mayhew (1812–1887), English social researcher and reforming journalist
- Horace Mayhew (1845–1926), British mining engineer
- Horace Mayhew (journalist) (1816–1872), English journalist
- John Mayhew (disambiguation), various people
- Jonathan Mayhew (1720–1766), American clergyman
- Judith Mayhew Jonas (born 1948), New Zealand-born British lawyer and academic
- Kenneth Mayhew (1917–2021), British Army veteran
- Lauren Mayhew (born 1985), American singer and actress
- Matthew Mayhew (1648–1710), Governor and Chief Magistrate of Martha's Vineyard
- Martin Mayhew (born 1965), American football player and executive
- Nell Brooker Mayhew (1875–1940), American artist
- Patrick Mayhew (1929–2016), British barrister and politician
- Peter Mayhew (1944–2019), English-born American actor
- Robert Mayhew (1880–1971), Canadian politician and diplomat
- Robert Mayhew (curler) (born 1993), Canadian curler
- Sara Mayhew (born 1984), Canadian writer and graphic artist
- Thomas Mayhew (1593–1682), Governor of Massachusetts who established the first English settlement of Martha's Vineyard in 1642
- Wilbur Waldo Mayhew (1920–2014), American zoologist

=== Fictional characters ===
- Alexander Mayhew, in the video game 007: Nightfire
- Benjamin Mayhew IX and Michael Mayhew (Honorverse), in David Weber's science fiction Honorverse series
- Brandon "Badger" Mayhew, in Breaking Bad and El Camino
- Dexter Mayhew, in One Day (TV series)
- Richard Mayhew, in Neil Gaiman's Neverwhere

== Given name ==
- Mayhew Beckwith (1798–1871), merchant and politician in Nova Scotia (in present-day Canada)
- Mayhew Folger (1774–1828), American whaler who rediscovered the Pitcairn Islands
- Mayhew Foster (1911–2011), American soldier
