= IC 3528 =

Galaxy in the constellation Coma Berenices

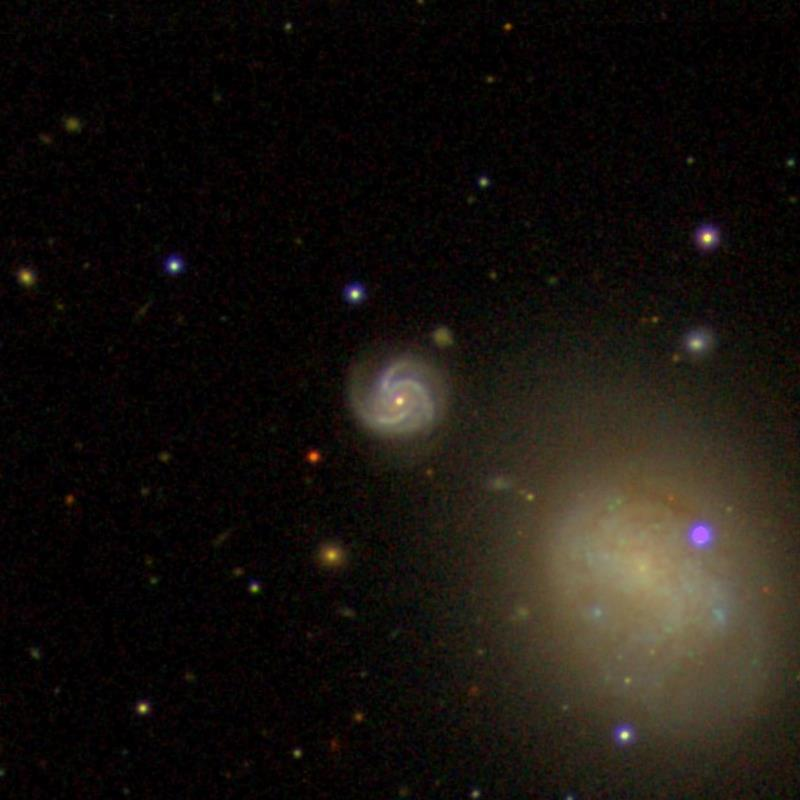
- SDSS image of IC 3528. Below the image is NGC 4540

Observation data (J2000 epoch)
- Constellation: Coma Berenices
- Right ascension: 12^{h} 34^{m} 55.90^{s}
- Declination: +15° 33′ 56.2″
- Redshift: 0.04582 0.00004
- Heliocentric radial velocity: 13,773 km/s
- Distance: 657 Mly (201.43 Mpc)
- Apparent magnitude (V): 14.6
- Apparent magnitude (B): 15.4

Characteristics
- Type: SAB(r)b, Sy 1.5
- Size: 0.40' x 0.4'
- Notable features: Seyfert Galaxy

Other designations
- PGC 41882, GSC 01446-00639, 2MASX J12345592+1533561, VCC 1593, Z 99-95, NVSS B123244+155026, ALFALFA 1-358, AGC 220811, SDSS J123455.90+153356.2, FAUST 3256, [HB91] 1232+158, LEDA 41882

IC 3528 is spiral galaxy located 660 million light-years away in the constellation of Coma Berenices. It lies near to another spiral galaxy NGC 4540, although the two of them are quite far. The object was discovered by Royal Harwood Frost on May 7, 1904. Although listed as a member in the Virgo Cluster Catalogue as VCC 1593, it is not a member of the Virgo cluster but a background galaxy.

== Physical characteristics ==
IC 3528 is classified a narrow-line Seyfert 1.5 type galaxy. Containing X-ray emission, the galaxy shows strong evidence of non-gravitational outflow kinematics in its [O III] λ5007 emission feature. In addition, IC 4528 contains broad emission lines with widths measuring Hβ FWHM ≤ 2000 km s^{−1} and is a type-1 active galactic nucleus (AGN) hosted inside a lower-luminosity galaxy that is found having a higher incidence of pseudo-bulges, with barred morphology, and considered less disturbed. This suggests narrow-line Type 1 AGNs like in the case of IC 3528, experiences a more quiescent evolutionary history that is driven primarily by internal secular evolution rather than external dynamical perturbations.

=== Starburst activity ===
IC 3528 has an estimated star formation rate of ≳6 M☉ yr^{−1} It is a dusty starburst galaxy exhibiting a strong Hδ line in absorption and modest [O II] emission, whom researchers found the galaxy is affected by reddening. Based on star formation rates derived from the FIR luminosities with the estimates based on the Hα line, they found the values obtained from these optical emission lines in IC 3528 are a factor of 10-70 (Hα) and 20-140 ([O II]) lower than the FIR estimates (50-300 M_{solar} yr^{−1}).

=== Metallicity ===
IC 3528 has a low gas fraction and higher oxygen abundance, making a it gas-poor galaxy and metal-rich, which demonstrates the idea that removal of gas from the outskirts of spirals increases the observed average metallicity by ~0.1 dex.

== Supernova ==
SN 2001Z, a Type II supernova was discovered in IC 3528 by astronomers Modjaz and Li, whom they saw it on an unfiltered image taken with KAIT on Mar. 3.5 UT. The supernova was located at R.A. = 12^{h} 34^{m} 55.87^{s}, Decl. = +15° 34′ 07.5″ (equinox 2000.0), which was located 0".5 west and 11".2 north of the nucleus. SN 2001Z was also captured by other astronomers named Phillips, Martin and Valladares who obtained its spectrum on Mar. 5.37 UT with the Baade telescope. They found the spectrum has a weak, relatively narrow H-alpha and H-beta emission lines on a strong, blue continuum and consistent with a type-II supernova caught at a very early epoch. The redshift of the emission lines is z = 0.045.

== Black hole ==
Initially having an estimated range of 10^{5.1} to 10^{10.3} M_{☉} with an Eddington ratio varying from −3.3 to 1.3 in logarithmic scale, IC 3528 has a low-mass black hole (BH) of BH masses M_{BH} ~10^{6} to 10^{8} M_{☉}, powered by accretion matter. Similar to IC 750, the budge-mass and stellar mass is found to be (7.3±2.7)×10^{8} M_{☉} and 1.4×10^{10} M_{☉} respectively, which the mass upper limit of the BH decreases by two orders of magnitude below the MBH-σ* relation and roughly one order of magnitude below the MBH-MBulge and MBH-M* relations. This is found larger than the relations' intrinsic scatters of 0.58±0.09 dex, 0.69 dex, and 0.65±0.09 dex.
