= IC 4687 =

Spiral galaxy in the constellation Pavo

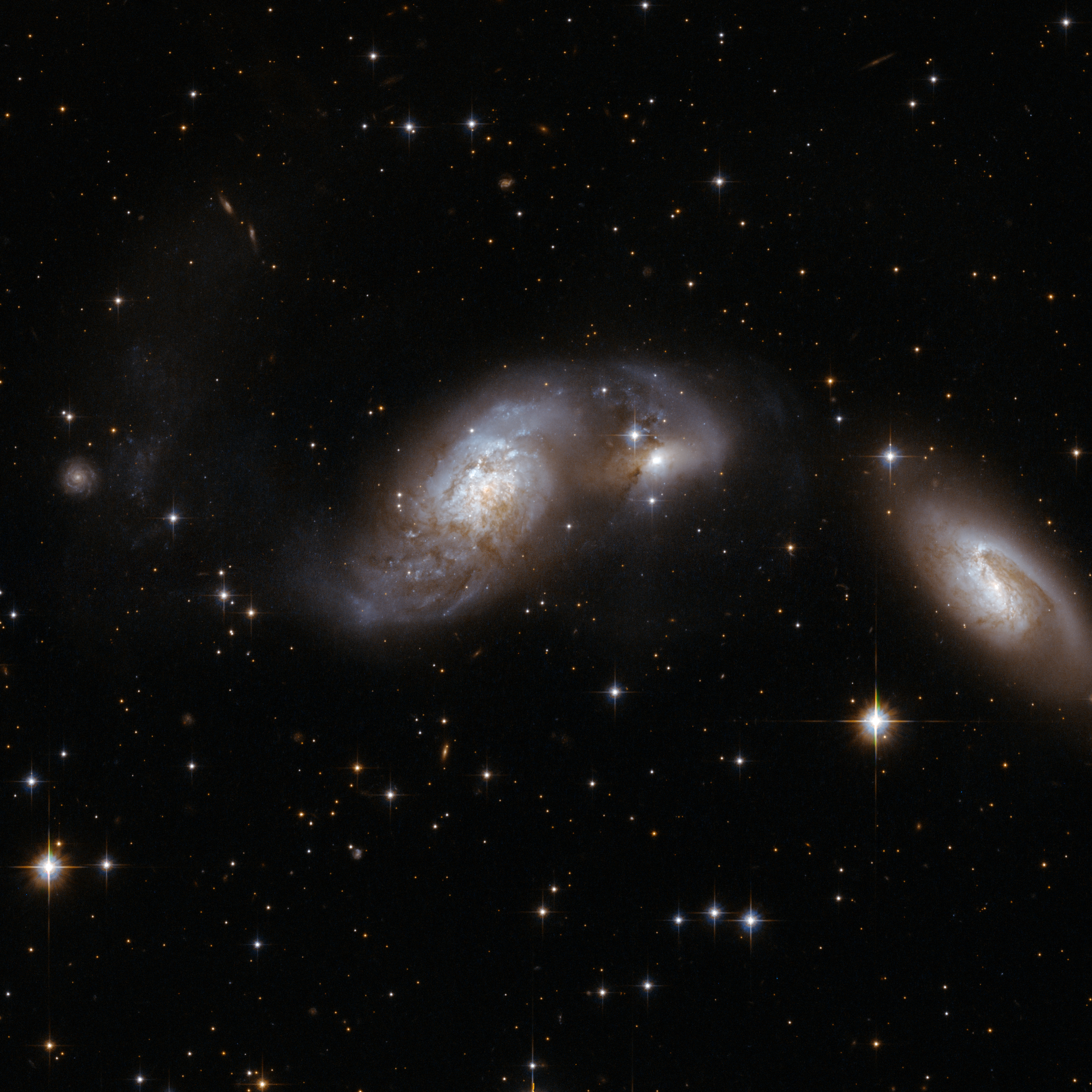
- HST image of IC 4687 (center).

Observation data (J2000 epoch)
- Constellation: Pavo
- Right ascension: 18^{h} 13^{m} 39.70^{s}
- Declination: −57° 43′ 30.97″
- Redshift: 0.017345
- Heliocentric radial velocity: 5,200 km/s
- Distance: 253 Mly (76.95 Mpc)
- Apparent magnitude (V): 0.33
- Apparent magnitude (B): 0.43

Characteristics
- Type: Sb, Sd, HI;LIRG
- Size: 70,000 ly (estimated)
- Apparent size (V): 1.3' x 0.9'

Other designations
- ESO 140-IG10, IRAS 18093-5744, PGC 61602, FAIRALL 045

IC 4687 known as IRAS 18093-5744 or F18093-5744, is an Sb spiral galaxy located in the constellation of Pavo. It is located 250 million light years from Earth and was discovered by Royal Harwood Frost on August 1, 1904, who described the object "as brighter middle with magnitude of 14. It has a surface brightness of 12.5.

== Characteristics ==
IC 4687 is classified as a luminous infrared galaxy. It has an infrared-luminosity of 10^{11.3} L_{Θ}, compatible with a star formation rate of 30 M_{Θ} yr^{−1}. Through it has an energy output dominated by its star formation, the galaxy has a weak active galactic nucleus.

The regions of IC 4687 are also known to contain high amounts of molecular gas surface densities of log Σ_{H2} (M_{Θ} pc^{−2}) = 2.9 ± 0.2. In additional, the galaxy is known to produce stars at a rapid rate when compared to normal star forming galaxies with the regions having log Σ_{SFR} (M_{Θ} yr^{−1} kpc^{−2}) = 0.7 ± 0.4. This units are considered ~ 10 factor higher when compared to extreme values of nearby galaxies. Not to mention, IC 4687 has a velocity field mainly controlled by rotation. It also has a defined kinematic center that is synchronous with its nucleus.

IC 4687 forms an interacting galaxy trio with two other galaxies, IC 4686 and IC 4689. Both of these galaxies are located ~ 10 and ~ 20 kiloparsecs away from IC 4687 and are classified as spiral-like with their velocity fields influenced by kinematic and rotation centers. Because of its close merger with IC 4686, a starburst and wolf-raynet galaxy, IC 4687 appears distorted. The Hubble images shows the galaxy has a distorted morphology with interstellar dust and gas apparently obscuring its companion. Not to mention, IC 4687 has large curly tidal tail as a result of the merger. It is possible the weak interaction from IC 4686 might triggered its starburst.
