= IC 3505 =

Galaxy in the constellation Coma Berenices

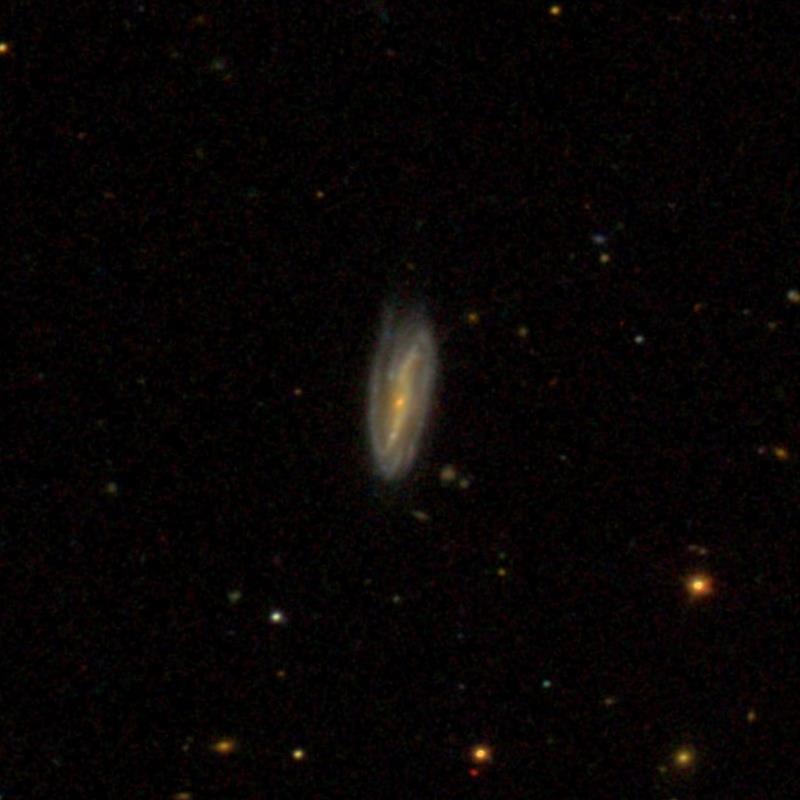
- IC 3505 captured by Sloan Digital Sky Survey

Observation data (J2000 epoch)
- Constellation: Coma Berenices
- Right ascension: 12^{h} 34^{m} 10.31^{s}
- Declination: +15° 58′ 05.60″
- Redshift: 0.046090
- Heliocentric radial velocity: 13,843 km/s
- Distance: 645 Mly (197.8 Mpc)
- Apparent magnitude (V): 12.412

Characteristics
- Type: SBc
- Size: 170,000 ly
- Apparent size (V): 1.01' x 0.41'

Other designations
- IRAS 12316+1614, MCG+03-032-070, PGC 41792, 2MASX J12341031+1558058, VCC 1542, GASS 30439, ALFAFFA 1-349, AGC 220790, NVSS J123410+155803, LEDA 41792

IC 3505 is a barred spiral galaxy located 640 million light-years away from the Solar System in the constellation Coma Berenices. With an apparent size of 0.95 by 0.35 arcmin, IC 3505 has an estimated diameter of 170,000 light-years, making it slightly larger compared to the Milky Way. It is categorized as a LINER galaxy with an active galactic nucleus emitting weak emission-lines.

IC 3505 was discovered by Royal Harwood Frost on May 7, 1904. According to Frost when he saw the object for the first time, he listed it as a type SBc at right ascension "12 34 10.3" and declination "+15 58 07". Despite being listed in the Virgo Cluster catalogue as VCC 1542, it is not part of the Virgo Cluster but a background galaxy.

Two supernovae have been discovered in IC 3505. SN 2019iaz (Type Ia, mag: 19.6) was discovered on June 21, 2019, by C. Fremling from Caltech on behalf on Zwicky Transient Facility (ZTF) and AT 2023gpz (unknown, mag: 20.2) which was discovered by K. De (also from ZTF) on April 21, 2023.
