= Matthew Mayhew =

English settler & governor (1644/48–1710)

Governor Matthew Mayhew (1644 or 1648 – 1710) was son of Thomas Mayhew Jr., and grandson of Thomas Mayhew Sr., an early settler of Martha's Vineyard, and a governor of the Vineyard, Nantucket and adjacent islands. Matthew succeeded his grandfather as Governor and Chief Magistrate in 1681/2, and occasionally preached to the Indians. He was appointed judge of the Court of Common Pleas for Dukes county in 1697, and remained on the bench until 1700. He was judge of probate from 1696 to 1710. He died in 1710.

Matthew's father Thomas Mayhew Junior had accompanied Thomas Mayhew Senior to New England in 1631/2 and was educated in the town schools of Medford and Watertown. He was tutored in the classics as a means of preparing for a ministerial career, but he never proceeded to university. He move to Martha's Vineyard with his father around 1641 and there became interested in the welfare of the Native Americans on the island. He learned their language and was soon preaching to them.

Thomas Mayhew Jr. is probably a more recognized missionary than his father as he was the first Englishman to conduct missionary work to the native Indians, three years before John Eliot. By 1651 he had converted close to two hundred. Visitors who were impressed with his work, as well as with the missionary efforts of John Eliot on the Mainland, solicited support for his efforts. Unfortunately, the younger Mayhew was lost at sea during a voyage back to England but the missionary cause was upheld by his father. Large numbers of Indians were converted during Mayhew Sr.’s time as Governor and the Indians gained the reputation as being the most civilized and christianized in America, with the first church being made in 1670. Even during King Philip’s War, they remained entirely loyal to the English cause. Mayhew would die on Martha’s Vineyard in 1682 but began a five generation line of Mayhews on the islands, all of which continued the missionary work.

Matthew was the third missionary on the island: after Thomas Junior's early death at sea in 1657, Thomas Senior took over the mission until his grandsons were of age. Initially, Matthew Mayhew, the oldest grandson, succeeded his father and grandfather as head missionary of the island. He studied at Harvard College, Cambridge, mastered the Wôpanâak language, and wrote a tract explaining the third generation of the Vineyard mission: A brief narrative of the success which the Gospel Hath Had, among the Indians, of Martha's Vineyard (1694): he discusses the language, political system and religion of the Wampanoags and includes several letters by missionaries from other parts of New England. But, ministry was not Matthew Mayhew's true calling; thus, from the age of twenty-one until his death, Rev. John Mayhew--- Matthew's younger brother and Experience Mayhew's father---took Matthew's place and became the minister to both the white population of Tisbury and the Wampanoags. Matthew went on to manage the family's estate.

"March 25, 1682: Governor for Life Thomas Mayhew died, and his position of control over Martha’s Vineyard and Nantucket Island passed to his grandson Matthew Mayhew. The grandson, an astute observer, would forsake titles such as “Governor for Life” and get himself appointed Chief Magistrate — a position in which he would be able to exercise nearly as total an authority as had his grandfather without nearly so much of a hassle."
