= 505 Cava =

Main-belt asteroid

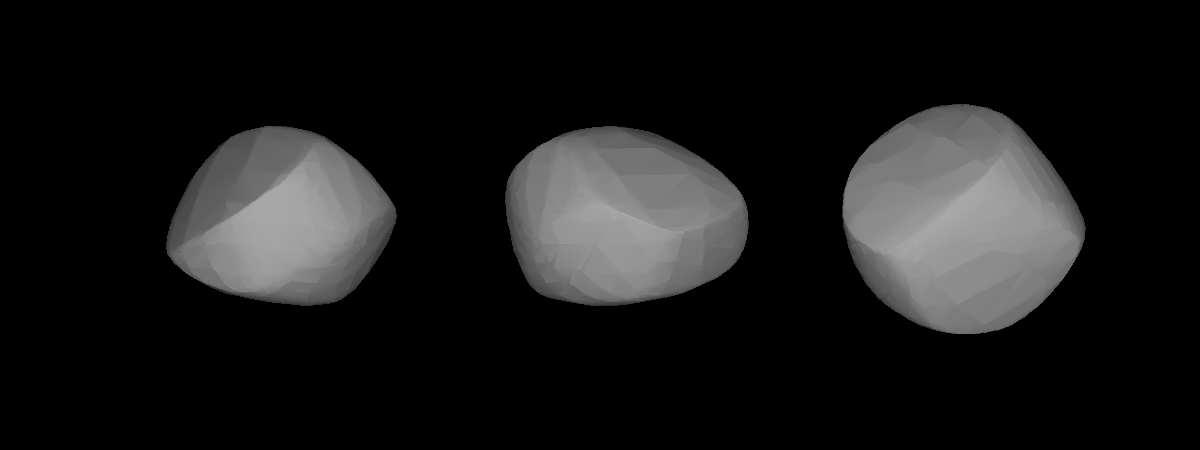
- A three-dimensional model of 505 Cava based on its light curve

Discovery
- Discovered by: R. H. Frost
- Discovery site: Arequipa
- Discovery date: 21 August 1902

Designations
- Named after: Mama Qawa, third queen of the Kingdom of Cuzco
- Alternative designations: 1902 LL

Orbital characteristics
- Epoch 31 July 2016 (JD 2457600.5)
- Uncertainty parameter 0
- Observation arc: 112.24 yr (40994 d)
- Aphelion: 3.3432 AU (500.14 Gm)
- Perihelion: 2.0229 AU (302.62 Gm)
- Semi-major axis: 2.6831 AU (401.39 Gm)
- Eccentricity: 0.24604
- Orbital period (sidereal): 4.40 yr (1605.3 d)
- Mean anomaly: 219.54°
- Mean motion: 0° 13^{m} 27.336^{s} / day
- Inclination: 9.8406°
- Longitude of ascending node: 90.876°
- Argument of perihelion: 337.156°

Physical characteristics
- Dimensions: 101.51 ± 1.83 km (composite estimate); 115 km
- Mass: (1.15±0.28)×10^{18} kg (Note: Calculated from its standard gravitational parameter GM = 0.077±0.019 km^{3}/s^{2}.)
- Mean density: 1.45 g/cm^{3} (Note: Assuming a diameter of 115 km.)
- Synodic rotation period: 8.1789 h (0.34079 d)
- Geometric albedo: 0.040
- Absolute magnitude (H): 8.61

505 Cava is a minor planet orbiting the Sun.

In 2001, the asteroid was detected by radar from the Arecibo Observatory at a distance of 1.18 AU. The resulting data yielded an effective diameter of 105 ± 17 km.
