= Ying Mei Chun =

Chinese educator

- 陳英梅
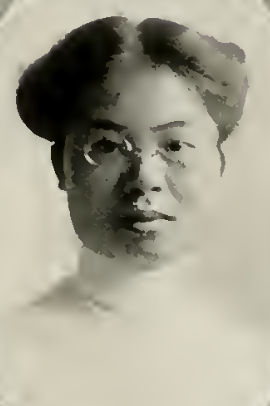
- Ying Mei Chun, from the 1913 yearbook of Wellesley College
- Born: about 1890; Hong Kong
- Died: August 17, 1938; Canton, China
- Other names: Ying Mei Chen, Ying Mei Lin, Chen Yingmei
- Occupation: Educator
- Relatives: Meyer Kupferman (son-in-law)

Ying Mei Chun (Chinese: 陳英梅; pinyin: Chén Yīngméi; c. 1890 – August 17, 1938) was a Chinese physical educator, based in Shanghai.

== Early life and education ==
Chun was from Hong Kong. She attended the McTyeire School in Shanghai, and graduated from Wellesley College in 1913. She took additional certification training in physical education in New York. Chun was chair of the woman's department of the Chinese Student Christian Association in North America in 1911. She was secretary of the Wellesley Alumnae Association chapter in Shanghai.

== Career ==
After graduating from college in the United States, Chun was director of the physical department of the Shanghai YWCA. She taught in the physical education program at Ginling College. and at "eight or ten girls' schools" in Shanghai, working as co-teacher and translator with American missionary educators Henrietta Thomson and Abby Shaw Mayhew. "Never have I seen such a living dynamo of energy as Miss Chun in the class-room," wrote fellow Wellesley College alumna Sophie Chantal Hart in 1919. "Her girls worked so joyously with such concentration and zest that it set your blood racing to watch them." She used dances and games to organize exercise activities, according to former students. She left teaching to marry.

While in the United States for school, Chun attended the Silver Bay conference of the YWCA. In 1915, she attended an international YWCA conference in Los Angeles. Another Wellesley alumna, Edith Stratton Platt, visited Chun and her family in 1922.

== Publications ==
- "A Wedding in South China" (1912)

== Personal life ==
In 1918, Chun married Dao Dan Yang Lin, a forestry professor at Nanking University. They had three children, including daughter Lin Peifen (also known as Peifen Kupferman or Peggy Lin), a choreographer and dance educator who married American composer Meyer Kupferman. Chun died in 1938, in Canton, in her late forties.
