= Sophie Chantal Hart =

American college professor

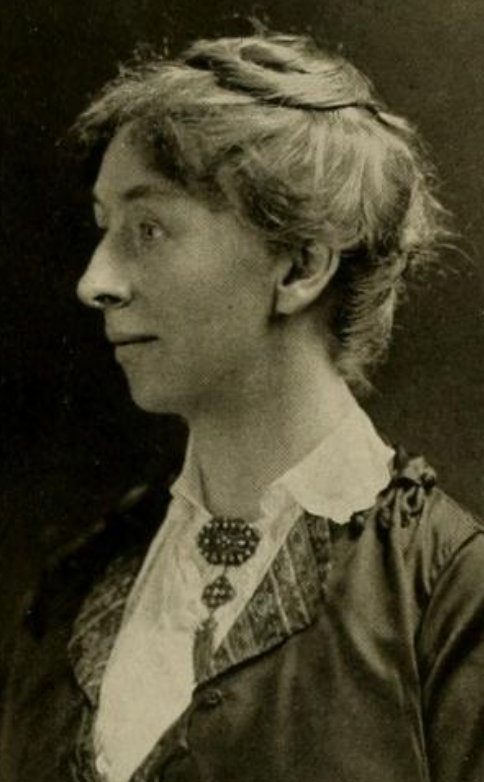
- Sophie Chantal Hart, from a 1915 yearbook
- Born: August 20, 1868; Waltham, Massachusetts
- Died: December 4, 1948; Tucson, Arizona
- Occupation: College professor

Sophie Chantal Hart (August 20, 1868 – December 4, 1948) was an American professor of English composition and head of the English department at Wellesley College from 1906 to 1936.

== Early life ==
Hart was born in Waltham, Massachusetts, the daughter of Eugene Hart and Ann McCormick Hart. She lived in San Francisco as a girl, after her widowed mother remarried. She earned a bachelor's degree at Harvard Annex (later Radcliffe College) in 1892, in the same small class as astronomer Henrietta Swan Leavitt. She earned a master's degree at the University of Michigan in 1898.

== Career ==
Hart taught English Composition at Wellesley College from 1892 to 1937, and head of the English department from 1906 to 1936. She edited and annotated editions of Tennyson's Gareth and Lynette, Lancelot and Elaine and The passing of Arthur (1903), and Nicholas Rowe's The Fair Penitent and Jane Shore (1907).

During World War I, Hart led the college's successful fundraising effort to provide an ambulance for the Red Cross in Paris. In addition to her studies in England, she took study and service trips to Russia, China, India, Turkey, and Japan. She was feared in danger after the 1923 Great Kantō earthquake. She knew Gandhi from her interest in the peace movement, and was a friend to Wellesley alumnae Ying Mei Chun and Mei-ling Soong. She retired from Wellesley in 1937; the following year, the school established a named chair and a lecture series in her honor.

Hart participated in the women's suffrage movement in Boston, and while visiting in England. She was also active in the American Association of University Women, the Modern Language Association, the YWCA and the Women's International League for Peace and Freedom in the 1920s. In 1933, Marjory Stoneman Douglas hosted her as a speaker at her studio in Florida. In retirement, she was president of the Tucson branch of the National League of American Pen Women.

== Personal life ==
Hart became guardian of three Japanese women students in the 1910s, bringing them from Japan to the United States for schooling. Hart retired to Tucson, Arizona, and died there in 1948, aged 80.
