= Massachusett dialects =

Algonquian language family dialects

The Massachusett dialects, as well as all the Southern New England Algonquian (SNEA) languages, could be dialects of a common SNEA language just as Danish, Swedish and Norwegian are mutually intelligible languages that essentially exist in a dialect continuum and three national standards. With the exception of Massachusett, which was adopted as the lingua franca of Christian Indian proselytes and survives in hundreds of manuscripts written by native speakers as well as several extensive missionary works and translations, most of the other SNEA languages are only known from fragmentary evidence, such as place names. Quinnipiac (Quiripey) is only attested in a rough translation of the Lord's Prayer and a bilingual catechism by the English missionary Abraham Pierson in 1658. Coweset is only attested in a handful of lexical items that bear clear dialectal variation after thorough linguistic review of Roger Williams' A Key into the Language of America and place names, but most of the languages are only known from local place names and passing mention of the Native peoples in local historical documents.

Within what is usually regarded as Massachusett, there were certainly dialects as it was spoken by several different peoples across a broad region, and widely adopted as a second language over most of New England and Long Island. The use of the dialect of the Massachusett—specifically the speech of the Praying town of Natick, with some Nipmuc influences—in the Bible led to it assuming the role of a de facto standard and prestige variant, especially in regards to writing. The spoken language was also highly influenced by the speech of Natick since a large number of the Indian missionaries, teachers and clerks included many men from prestigious, chiefly families from or with kinship connections there or had spent several years there in training before going on to serve other Indian communities. The Indians adopted literacy with the orthography of Eliot's Bible, and even began to adjust their speech, leading to dialect leveling across the region. By 1722, only fifty-nine years after the publication Eliot's Bible translation, Experience Mayhew remarked on the leveling effects on Martha's Vineyard, where the local speech was quite distinct, '... most of the little differences betwixt them have been happily Lost, and our Indians Speak, but especially write much as the Natick do.

Some vestiges of dialects continued even with leveling, and Martha's Vineyard islanders continued to use variant forms such as ohkuh instead of ohke (ahkee) /ahkiː/ 'earth' or 'land,' and ummenaweankanut, 'in his posterity,' instead of uppommetuwonkkanit (upumeetyuwôkanut) /əpəmiːtʲəwãkanət/ Occasional variation in spelling seems to indicate some dialectal interference. Syncopation, relatively rare in Natick speech, was a spreading feature and seems to have been an obligatory feature of late-stage SNEA languages, possibly an influence from the Abenakian languages. Thus, kuts, 'cormorant,' and ꝏsqheonk, 'his blood,' but more generally these words are found as non-syncopated kuttis (kutuhs) /kətəhs/ and wusqueheonk (wusqeeheôk) /wəskʷiːhiːjᵊãk/, respectively, that appeared in the Bible. Nevertheless, most of the surviving manuscripts and documents that do demonstrate dialectal variation are often of uncertain geographical and ethnic origin.

Daniel Gookin, who had traveled with John Eliot on his missions, brought the Indians under the jurisdiction of the colonial government and was responsible for bringing the Indians under English laws and governance. He noted that the Pawtucket, Massachusett and Pokanoket (Wampanoag) all spoke the same language, and may have considered the separate peoples to have spoken distinct dialects. Ives Goddard proposed the dialects of Natick, North Shore (Pawtucket), Wampanoag, Nauset and Coweset, produced somewhat similarly below, and is mostly grouped according to the various peoples known in history that are believed to have spoken the language.

== Massachusett ==
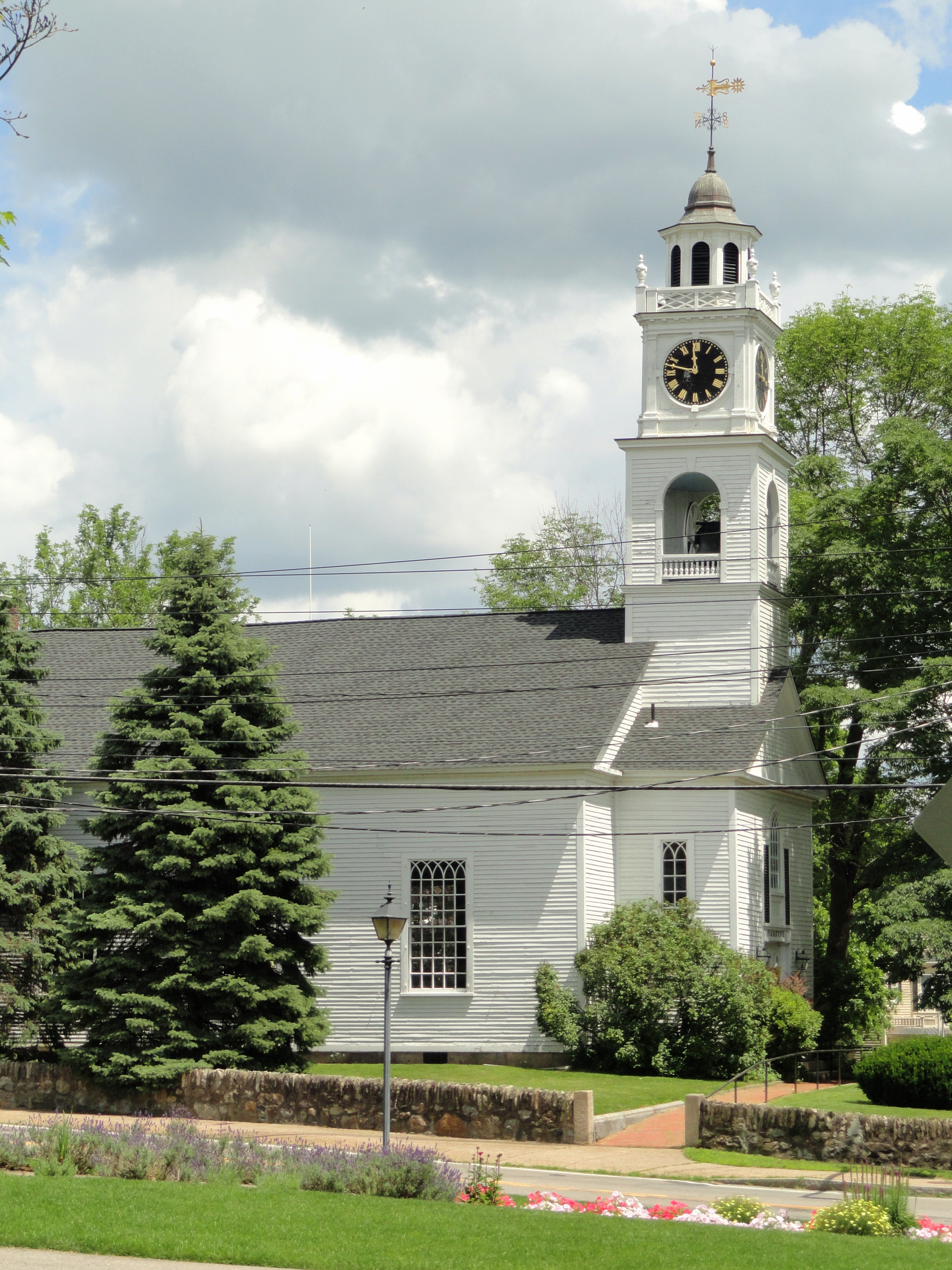
The Church of South Natick built over the original church in 1828. Services were conducted by Indian congregants in Massachusee unnontꝏwaonk well into the mid-18th century.

The dialect specific to the Massachusett people was likely a prestigious dialect. Elderly converts in Natick informed Eliot and Gookin that the Massachusett leaders were able to exert political influence and exact tribute over most of the other Massachusett-speaking peoples and all the tribes as far west as the Pioneer Valley, such as the Nipmuc, Nashaway and Pocomtuc, before weakened by epidemics that greatly reduced the population, warfare with enemy tribes and competition with English settlers. As a practical feature, the Massachusett were centrally located between other Massachusett speakers, thus it was understood over a broader region of the dialect continuum.

The dialect was likely the basis of Massachusett Pidgin, adopted as a regional language of commerce and intertribal communication over most of New England and Long Island. The Natick variety was used by Eliot as the basis of the written language used in his translations of the Bible and other works, thus making it an unofficial standard language of writing, and also prestigious variety because of the pronounced role of Natick and its people in the mission to the Indians. The influence caused significant dialect leveling as speakers adjusted their speech, thus the Natick variety greatly influenced dialects enough to erase many of the differences.

From place name and document evidence, Massachusett seems to prefer the locative suffix -et/-it/-ut /ət/ over the older form /ək/ form that generally appears elsewhere, and many place names were 'standardized' to Massachusett spellings and norms across the region. Although the latter form still appears in Massachusett written sources of Natick until a late period, in place names, it is not found in traditional Massachusett or Narragansett place names and had varying mixtures of usage elsewhere. The dialect of the Massachusett also seems to have resisted syncope, which is obligatory in many late-stage SNEA languages, which may have been prevented in Massachusett due to fossilization as a written language.

Massachusett people historically ranged over much of the Greater Boston region, lining the shores of Boston Harbor and extending west towards the fall line, corresponding roughly to the 128 beltway, and much of the South Shore almost as far south as Plymouth. They were later confined to the Praying towns of Natick and Ponkapoag, in Natick and Canton, and Titicut and Mattakeesett, corresponding to Bridgewater and Pembroke, Massachusetts.

As the Massachusett were mainly confined to the Praying towns and adjusted to the written language, it is uncertain if there was any internal diversity. Natick was originally settled by Massachusett people from Nonantum, later joined by the Nipmuc that lived west of Natick. Although the community remained a Massachusett-speaking one, it is quite possible that Nipmuc influenced it to some extent. Titicut and Mattakeesett were near Wampanoag areas, and many of the Praying Indians in those communities were close to and had kinship relations with Wampanoag just to the south. The language survived until the 1740s when the Indians were reduced to colonial wards under appointed guardians and large portions of the town were either sold or rented to English settlers. Only one speaker could be found in 1798, and the language likely went extinct in the dawning years of the nineteenth century. Although no speakers remain today, the two state-recognized Massachusett tribes of Natick and of Ponkapoag continue to use the language in its colonial orthography for cultural, sacred and liturgical purposes. Both of these tribes have state recognition under the Massachusetts Commission on Indian Affairs.

The written language survives in the records of Natick until 1721, when administrative control of the town passed into the hands of English settlers. In addition, it is essentially the language of all of Eliot's translations of the Bible and several other religious works by other Christian missionaries and some personal letters from Natick.

== Wampanoag (Pokanoket) ==
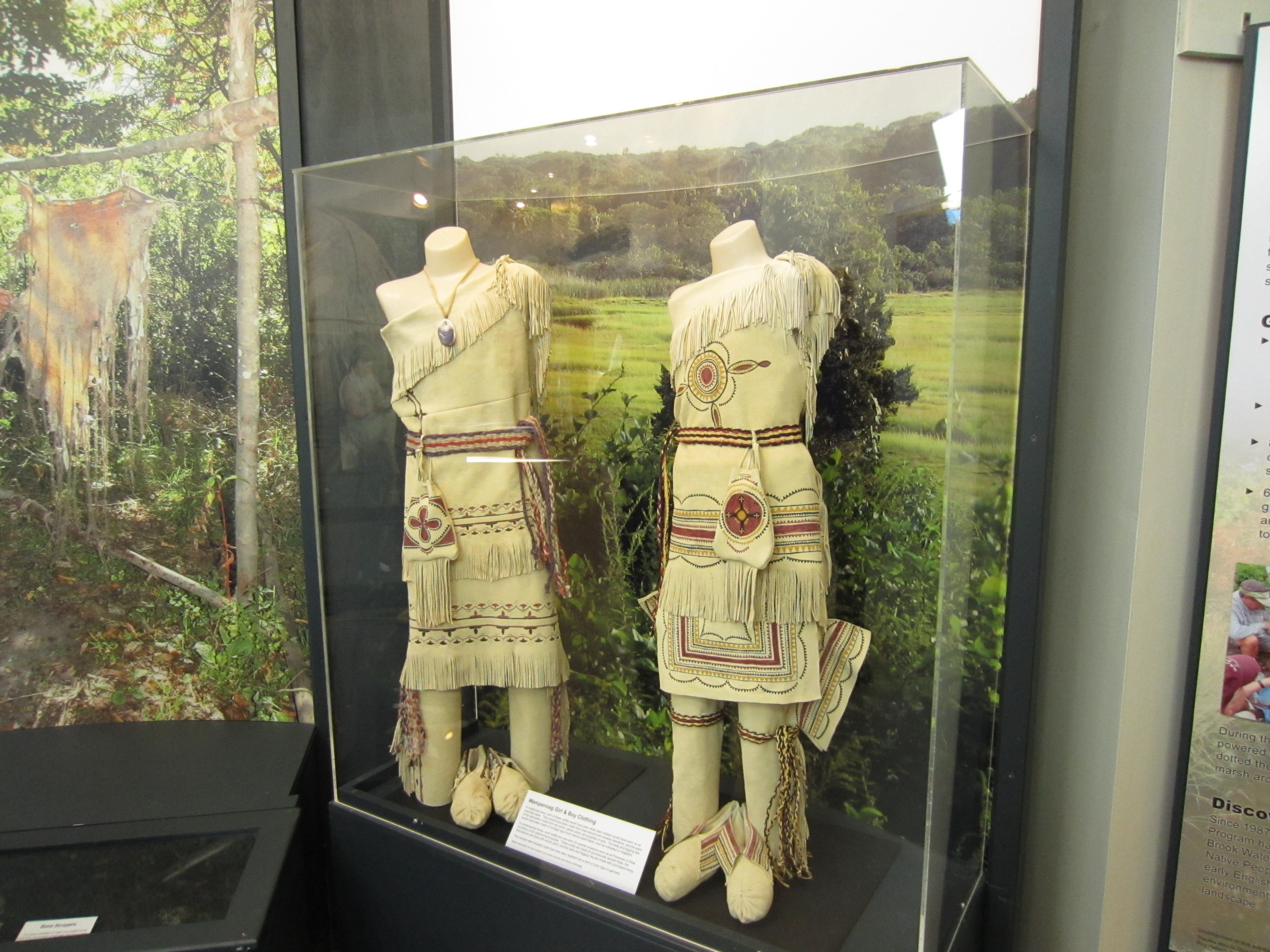
Customary Wampanoag clothing at the Cape Cod Museum. The Wampanoag were able to preserve much of their culture and identity, and as of 1993, are reviving their language.

The Wampanoag language (Wôpanâôt8âôk) /wãpanaːãtuːaːãk/, spoken by Wampanoag people also called Pokanoket, had historical variation due to the insular regions. The Wampanoag mainly lived in southeastern Massachusetts, with more historical communities on Cape Cod, the Elizabeth Islands, Martha's Vineyard, and Nantucket. Wampanoag also historically inhabited much of southeastern Rhode Island. The name of the people refers to the "east" or "dawn," from Massachusett wompan- (wôpan-) /wãpan/. Contemporary speakers of the Massachusett language speak a revived Wampanoag dialect of the Wôpanâak Language Reclamation Project.

The isolation of islanders from the mainland led to dialectal diversity. John Cotton Sr. (1639–1699), a missionary from Martha's Vineyard, told his son, a missionary to the Wampanoag just south of Plymouth, on the mainland, the following to describe mutual intelligibility:

Mat woh nummissohhamꝏ͝un asuh matta newahĭteo webe yeu noowahteauun yeug Indiansog mat wahtanooog uag Indiansog ut nishnoh kuttooonganit.

I can't tell or don't know, only this I know, that these Indians don't understand every word of them Indians.'

The island regions of Nantucket, Martha's Vineyard, and the Elizabeth Islands all shared some common features that kept them distinct from the mainland but were distinct from each other. Martha's Vineyard was the most divergent speech, difficult for off-islanders from the mainland or other islands. Despite dialect leveling that helped erase these features, the written documents continue to have a small set of divergent vocabulary that persists in Native documents produced by Martha's Vineyard islanders. For example, nehpuk, "my blood," continues in use despite the standard form nusqeheonk (nusqeeheôk) /nəskʷiːhjãk/. The continued variant forms in writing probably was a legacy of the separate network of missionaries and missionary schools. The Wampanoag on the mainland often accepted ministers and literate Indians from or who had trained in Natick, whereas the Martha's Vineyard Wampanoag were administered by the Mayhew family, with several generations of bilingual ministers working the mission and providing instruction and establishment of Indian schools which may have reinforced local features.

The Wampanoag on Cape Cod and the Islands were fortunate to have been isolated from the ravages of King Philip's War and for having the trust of neighboring English settlers, and these Wampanoag tribes emerged from the war relatively unscathed. The population of Wampanoag increased after the war as many Indians joined the larger settlements, where the English settlers were more tolerant, land was still ample, proximity to seaports where men could find work on whaling vessels and ability to find Indian spouses, and by the early 18th century, it is estimated that 70 percent of the Indians in Massachusetts were Wampanoag or had assimilated into the Wampanoag community. As a result, the spoken language was able to cling on as the dominant language until the 1770s, but the fluent first-language speakers died in Martha's Vineyard sometime in the late 19th century. Those that knew bits of the language were recorded by Frank Speck and Gladys Tantaquidgeon in the 1920s, but Gordon Day was able to record some vocabulary from a Wampanoag as late as the 1960s.

The documents from the Wampanoag make up the majority of surviving written records, such as the marriage, baptism, and death records of Indian churches; deeds and land sales; petitions to the court; personal letters; marginalia on the edges of books, letters, and other records. In addition, the Wampanoag dialect influenced the second publication of the Massachusett-language Bible, edited with the help of John Cotton Sr. and the five contributions of Experience Mayhew to Indian missionary literature, including the most widespread primer for teaching Indians to read and write in the first quarter of the eighteenth century. Both John Cotton Sr. and Experience Mayhew spoke the Martha's Vineyard dialect fluently.

With the current success of the language by the WLRP, there is a growing L2 community of 15 (Wôpanâôt8âôk) Wampanoag speakers and students from the participating Mashpee, Aquinnah, Herring Pond and Assonet tribes and new records in the revived orthography such as complete teaching materials for pre-school through high school, a dictionary, a grammar and numerous other didactic publications. There are just under 3,000 Wampanoag people split between the federally recognized tribes of Mashpee and Aquinnah (Gay Head), as well as the Assonet, Pocasset, Herring Pond, Chappaquiddick and Seaconke tribes. A total of 6,427 people claimed Wampanoag ancestry in the 2010 U.S. census.

== Pawtucket ==
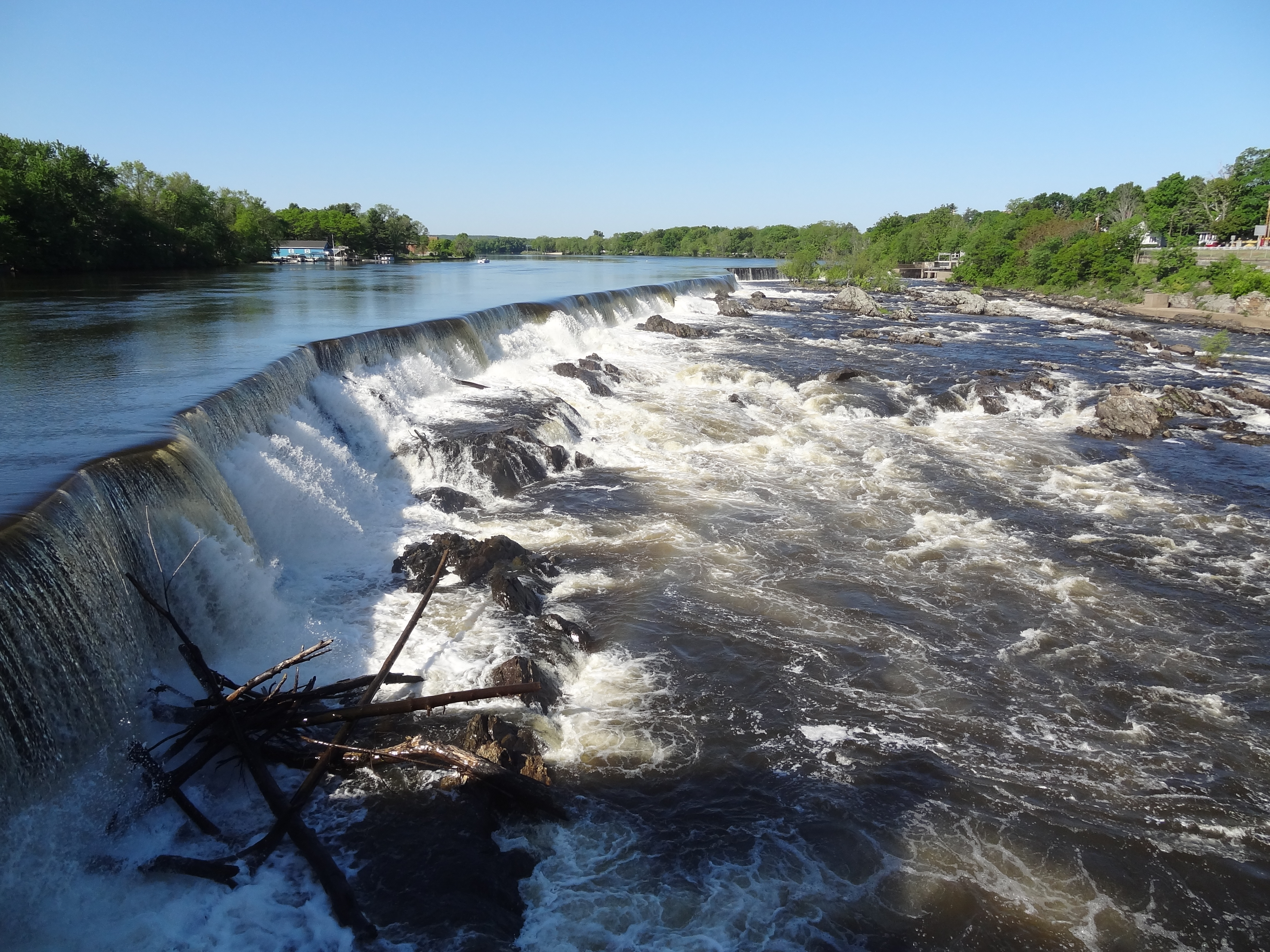
The Pawtucket Falls. This is close to the site of the former Praying Town of Wamesit, but the Pawtucket fled north to join the Pennacook and Abenaki after Metacomet's Rebellion.

The Pawtucket were a collection of tribes living north of the Massachusett, corresponding to the regions of the North Shore, Cape Ann, the northern third of Central Massachusetts and the lower Merrimack Valley and its tributaries. It includes the Naumkeag, Agawam and Aberginian peoples listed in early colonial sources. Prior to English settlement, the Pawtucket were likely part of the Massachusett Confederacy, but as the Massachusett were weakened by disease, loss of land, attacks from enemy tribes and competition from English settlers, most of the tribes fell under the influence of the Pennacook, an Abenakian people that traditionally inhabited the Merrimack Valley of southern and central New Hampshire, extending into northern areas of Central Massachusetts. The name derives from pawtucket, a common place name in New England which seems to be a contraction of pentucket (punuhtukut) /pənəhtəkət/ and signifies 'at the waterfall,' specifically Pawtucket Falls, a major waterfall on the Merrimack in the city of Lowell, Massachusetts.

The dialect of the Pawtucket is mainly known from a vocabulary of roughly three hundred words in William Wood's 1634 New-Englands Prospect as well as place names. The vocabulary is too small to provide clear information about the Pawtucket dialect, but it does demonstrate that the Pawtucket, at least along the coast, essentially spoke the same language as the Massachusett. What might appear as dialectal differences are often because many words seem to be suffixed with the obviative or diminutive endings, but some might vocabulary might have Abenakian influence, as the Pawtucket occupied the SNEA frontier with Abenakian languages, but even Gookin and Eliot considered the Pawtucket to have spoken essentially the same language as the Massachusett.

The dialect was likely extinct by the early eighteenth century if not earlier. Most of the Pawtucket had fled north and joined the Pennacook due to usurpation of their lands, but some came under the influence of Eliot's mission to the Indians, settling with Pennacook and Nipmuc in the Praying town of Wamesit and the Nipmuc and Massachusett in the Praying town of Okommakamesitt (Marlborough, Massachusetts) where these Indians may have fallen under the influence of the Massachusett dialect of Natick as used in writing. After King Philip's War, those that returned to Wamesit and Okommakamesitt faced harassment, vandalized property, retaliatory attacks and continuous challenges to their land. Under threats and pressure, Wamesit was sold by 1685, with its people following the Merrimack north with other peoples to seek shelter with the Pennacook, who in turn, later merged into the Abenaki of northern New England and Canada. Okommakamesitt was sold in 1686 by the General Court with a false deed produced by the English settlers on the edges of the Praying town. All but a handful of Indians retained their lands in Marlborough until they too were dispossessed in 1716, with most resettling in Natick, joining relatives up north or quietly assimilating into the surrounding community. The Pawtucket are extinct as a tribe today, but a handful of people in the Greater Lowell region and southern New Hampshire trace their ancestry back to the Pawtucket associated with Wamesit.

== Nauset ==
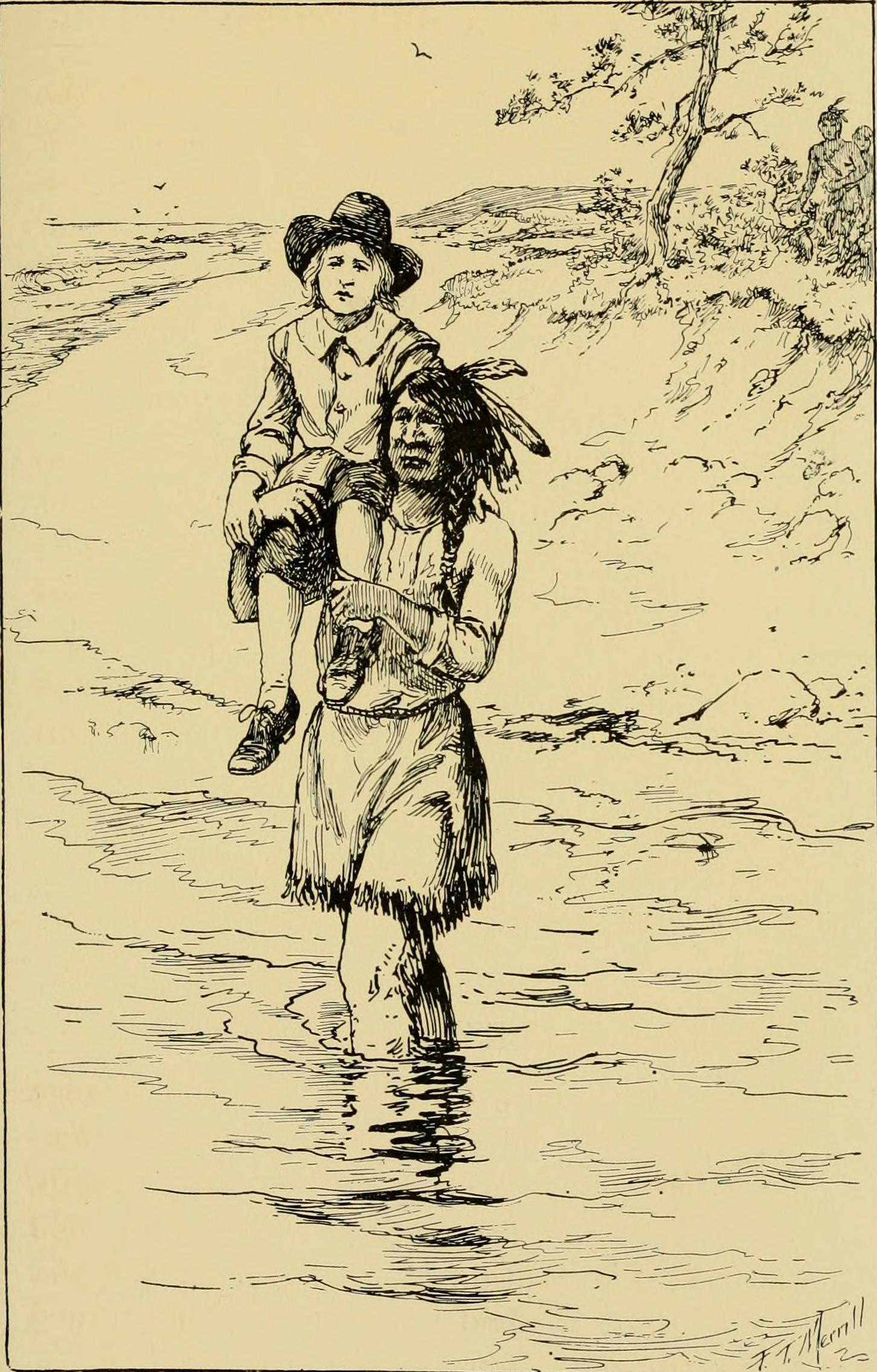
Illustration of Sachem Iyannough bringing the lost boy, John Billington, back to Plymouth.

The Nauset dialect was supposed to have been spoken by the Nauset people, traditionally inhabiting all the lands of 'Mid Cape' and 'Outer' or 'Lower Cape' regions of the Cape Cod Peninsula, roughly coinciding with all the portions of the peninsula east of the Bass River, including the sharp bend north from Chatham to Provincetown, and associated islands such as Monomoy Island. The Nauset may have also had outposts or settled parts of Nantucket. The name may derive from nashw- (nuhshw-) /nəhʃw/, 'three' but also used in the sense of 'between' as in 'third between two others,' due to the location of their principal settlement between two harbors, but probably derives from nôset (nôw[ee]sut) /nãw[iː]sət/, referring to a 'place of small distance' probably referring to the narrowness of the Cape Cod peninsula.

There is little known about the dialect of the Nauset, as it only exists in place names. It is uncertain if the Nauset were a separate entity. Despite a somewhat difference of culture, due to salty and sandy soils that forced a heavier reliance on exploitation of resources from the sea, the Nauset were likely a tribe of Wampanoag and therefore consideration of their speech as a separate dialect is probably because of their listing in historical, and many current, sources that list the Nauset as a separate people. However, the Nauset could have been a separate entity, given their isolation on the edge of the narrows of the Outer Cape and their resistance to joining the Pokanoket Confederacy, which governed all the Wampanoag tribes, at various points in history.

The Nauset are extinct as a people today. The Nauset were able to survive the ravages of King Philip's War unscathed due to their isolation, trust of the local English settlers and neutrality. Most of the Nauset relocated to Mashpee where they joined the local Wampanoag when it was established as a Praying town of the Plymouth Colony, and thus, many Mashpee Wampanoag likely have significant Nauset ancestry in their Native bloodlines. The unique features of the speech of the Wampanoag remembers from Mashpee recorded by Speck may be due to Nauset features but could just as easily be considered dialectal variation, late-stage language usage and incorrect 'remembering' of the language as it was recorded from elders that did not speak the language.

== Coweset dialect (Narragansett?) ==
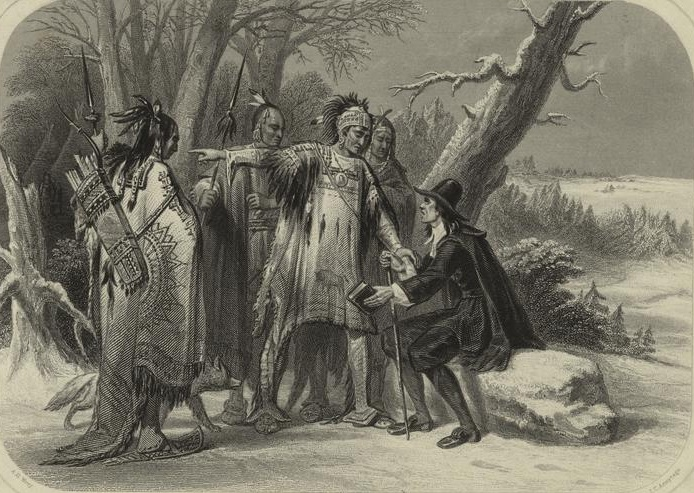
Engraving of Roger Williams meeting with members of the Narragansett. In addition to many words of Narragansett and Massachusett origin, Williams recorded some terms of Coweset in his 1643 A Key into the Language of America.

The Coweset people inhabited much of what is now central and northern Rhode Island, wedged between the Nipmuc to the north and north-west and the Narragansett (Nanhigganeuck), with the town of Woonsocket, Rhode Island purchased by Roger Williams from local Nipmuc and Coweset peoples. The Coweset were sometimes considered a tribe of Nipmuc, but they seem to have spoken an N-dialect, akin to Massachusett, and came under the political control of the Narragansett until they were able to shake off Narragansett domination in the late seventeenth century. The name derives from Massachusett kꝏwaset (*k8wasut) /kuːwasət/, 'small pine place.'

Very little is known about the dialect of the Coweset. From place names, the language was an N-dialect, like Massachusett, but was wedged in a transitional area Massachusett to the north and north-east, L-dialect Nipmuc to the north-west and the Narragansett Y-dialect to the south. It is only attested in dialectal variation that appear in doublets and triplets in Roger Williams' A Key into the Language of America. By Williams' own accounts, most of his time in Rhode Island was spent with the Coweset, and the Narragansett were Y-dialect speakers, yet most of the vocabulary of the Key features N-dialect vocabulary.

The majority of vocabulary in the Key is essentially Massachusett with the idiosyncratic system Williams used to write Algonquian words, followed by Y-dialect words. A small subset include N-dialect words with pronounced features of Y-dialects. For instance, the word to refer to the animal 'deer' is listed by Williams as attuck, cognate to Massachusett attuck (ahtuq') /ahtək/ and nóonatch, which seems to be related to Mohegan-Pequot Y-dialect noyuhc /nuːjəhtʃ/. In another instance, the PSNEA verb *ərāyəw, 'it is so,' appears in a cognate Massachusett form nni, related to Massachusett unnai (unây) /ənaːj/, Y-dialect eîu */əjaːjəw/ and transitional N-dialect nnîu */[ə]naːjəw/, which preserves the final /-əw/ that was seldom used in Massachusett.

As Narragansett is a Y-dialect, as seen in the short word list recorded by Ezra Stiles in 1769 from an elderly Narragansett women near Aquidneck (Newport, Rhode Island) and twenty words extracted by Alfred Gatschet from a Narragansett-language 'rememberer' in Pôcasset (Providence, Rhode Island), it is clear that the language spoken near the end was unambiguously a Y-dialect. However, this may be because the Narragansett were greatly reduced by King Philip's War and survivors joined the Eastern Niantic, who also spoke a Y-dialect, so that most Narragansett after the war have significant Eastern Niantic ancestry and this may have re-enforced Y-dialect features. It is the position of Ives Goddard and David Costa that the N-dialect vocabulary identical to Massachusett is Massachusett, since Williams spent his formative years in the New World bouncing between the Massachusetts Bay and Plymouth colonies; the N-dialect with Y-dialect features represents a transitional dialect that Coweset would likely have been due to its location and Y-dialect vocabulary that represents Narragansett or possibly Eastern Niantic.

The Coweset are extinct as a people today. It is likely that many Coweset joined the Narragansett in seeking refuge with the Eastern Niantic and have distant descendants in current members of the Narragansett. Many Coweset likely fled and joined the Stockbridge-Munsee, Schaghticoke in northwestern Connecticut, the Abenaki in Canada or the Brothertown tribe, which together with the Stockbridge-Munsee, were removed to Wisconsin.

== Other dialects and dialect comparison ==
The Aquidneck Indian Council, a Rhode Island-recognized educational and cultural institution for Native Americans, re-translated the Algonquian content of Roger Williams' Key into the Language of America, in an effort to better document and revive the Narragansett language, using comparisons with the Massachusett-language corpus as well as reconstructions based on evolutionary patterns of linguistic change from PA to SNEA. This, however, would be considered by other specialists, such as Goddard and Costa, as conflation of the mixed dialects found in the Key. However, even if only using Y-dialect material to reconstruct Narragansett would still produce a language similar still similar to other SNEA languages, which were most likely as related to each other as the dialects of the Nordic languages whose speakers can communicate, using their respective languages, and still understand and be understood by other parties, with difficulties increasing with distance and certain aberrant dialects.

The Massachusett language also spread, with the majority of Eliot's Praying towns established in Nipmuc country as well as a few located near the confluence of Nipmuc, Pawtucket, Massachusett and Pennacook influence, such as Wamesit, but possibly also possibly Nashoba (Littleton, Massachusetts) as well as other missionary communities such as Washacum (Sterling, Massachusetts) and Nashaway (Lancaster, Massachusetts). The Nipmuc also came to settle Natick, with James Printer said to be the most prolific translator as well as printer of Eliot's Indian Bible. The Indians that chose to stay away likely preserved their languages. For instance, a French missionary priest near Montreal, Quebec recorded a language sometime in the mid-eighteenth century that was most similar to Massachusett, complete with numerous loan words from English but was clearly an L-dialect, so may represent the original Nipmuc language removed from the standardizing effects of the prestigious Massachusett used by the literate Indians or a related but unknown language of New England's central interior.

Dialect Comparison
English	Natick	Wôpanâak (Revived)	Wôpanâak (Plymouth)	North Shore (Pawtucket)	Narragansett (Coweset?)	Loup (Nipmuc?)
'fox'	wonksis^{1}	(wôquhs) /wãkʷəhs/	wonkqǔssis^{1}	peqwas, whauksis^{1}	wonkis	
'my mother'	nꝏkas	(n8kas) /nuːkas/	nookas, nutookasin, nútchēhwau	nitka	nókace, nitchwhaw	nȣkass
'one'	nequt	(nuqut) /nəkʷət/	nequt	aquit	nquít	
'duck'	quasseps	(seehseep), /siːhsiːp/	sesep, qunŭsseps	seaseap	quequécum	
'boy'	nonkomp	(nôkôp) /nãkãp/	nonkomp	nonkompees^{1}	núckquachucks	langanbasis^{1}
'deer'	ahtuck	(ahtuhq) /ahtəhk/	attŭk	ottucke	attuck	
'to kill'	nush	(nuhsh) /nəhʃ/	nish	cram	niss	nissen
'shoe'	mokis	(mahkus) /mahkəs/	mohkis	mawcus	mockuss	makissin /mahkəsən/
'head'	muhpuhkuk	(mupuhkuk) /məpəhkək/	muppuhkuk	boquoquo	uppaquóntap	metep
'bear'	mosq	(masq) /mask/	mashq		mosq, paukúnawaw	
'canoe'	mishꝏn	(muhsh8n) /məhʃuːn/	muhshoon		mishòon	amizȣl /aməhsuːl/
'it is white'	wompi	(wôpây) /wãpaːj/	wompi	wompey	wómpi	ȣanbai /wãpaːj/
'man'	woskétop	(waskeetôp) /waskiːtãp/	wosketop		wosketomp	
'chief'	sachem, sontim	(sôtyum) /sãtʲəm/	sachem	sachem	sâchem	sancheman /sãtʲəmã/
'my father'	nꝏshe	(n8hsh) /nuːhʃ/	noosh	noeshow^{2}	nòsh	nȣs */nuːhs/

- ^1 Seems to have the diminutive suffix -ees appended.
- ^2 Seems to have the obviative suffix -oh (-ah) appended.
