= Joseph Mayhew =

Eldest son of Deacon Simon and Ruth Mayhew

Joseph Mayhew (1709/10 – 1782) was the Chief Justice of Dukes County, Massachusetts. The eldest son of Deacon Simon and Ruth Mayhew, Mayhew graduated from Harvard in 1730. His career included being a tutor of John Adams at Harvard and a Preacher.

Joseph Mayhew was a lineal descendant of Thomas Mayhew, Governor of Martha's Vineyard. His father Simon Mayhew was the youngest brother of Rev. Experience Mayhew, a noted preacher to the Indians in his day. Simon might not have sent Joseph to College if Harvard had not in 1723 forced an honorary M.A. on Uncle Experience Mayhew in recognition of his work as a missionary to the Indians. Joseph graduated at Harvard College 1730 in the class with Chief Justice Peter Oliver and Hon. Stephen Minot.

Mayhew had served as Tutor at Harvard since 1739 and Fellow of the Corporation since 1742. He administered John Adams' examination to Harvard, as described in a famous and charming passage in John Adams' diary and autobiography. He was first the Latin tutor of John Adams. Adams later took all of his courses under him. One of John Adams' favorite subjects with Mayhew was rhetoric.

Joseph Mayhew resigned in July 1755 and returned to Martha's Vineyard. He never married but was a leader of the patriots in the American Revolution. He died in 1782 and is buried in Abel's Hill Cemetery on Martha's Vineyard near the grave of his uncle Experience Mayhew.
