= Thomas Mayhew =

American colonist (1593–1682)

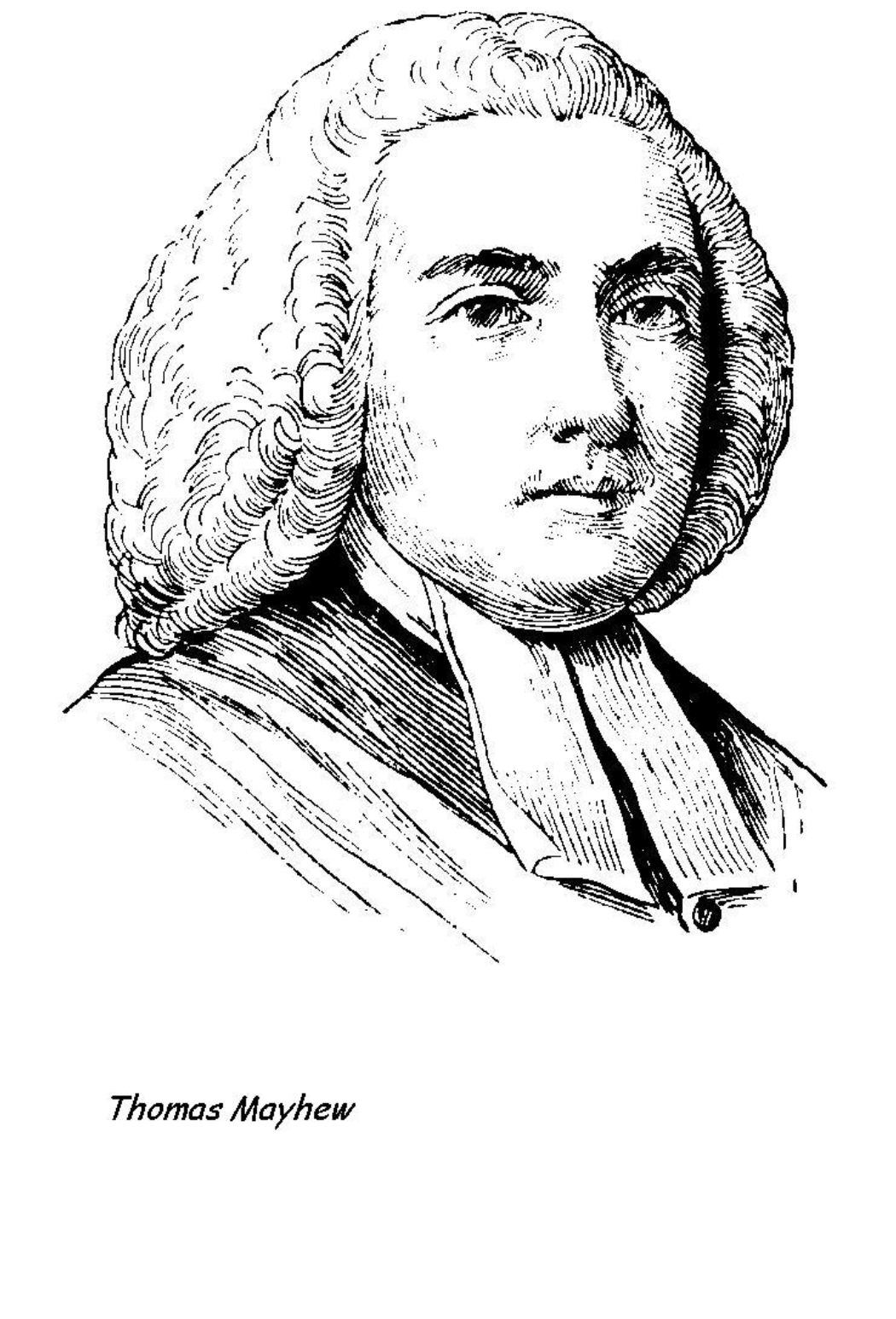
- Born: April 1, 1593; Tisbury, Wiltshire, England
- Died: March 25, 1682 (aged 88); Edgartown, Massachusetts, US

Governor Thomas Mayhew, the Elder (April 1, 1593 – March 25, 1682) established the first European settlement on Martha's Vineyard, Nantucket, and adjacent islands in 1642. He is one of the editors of the Bay Psalm Book, the first book published in the Thirteen Colonies. His assistant Peter Foulger was the grandfather of Benjamin Franklin.

== Biography ==
Coat of Arms of Thomas Mayhew

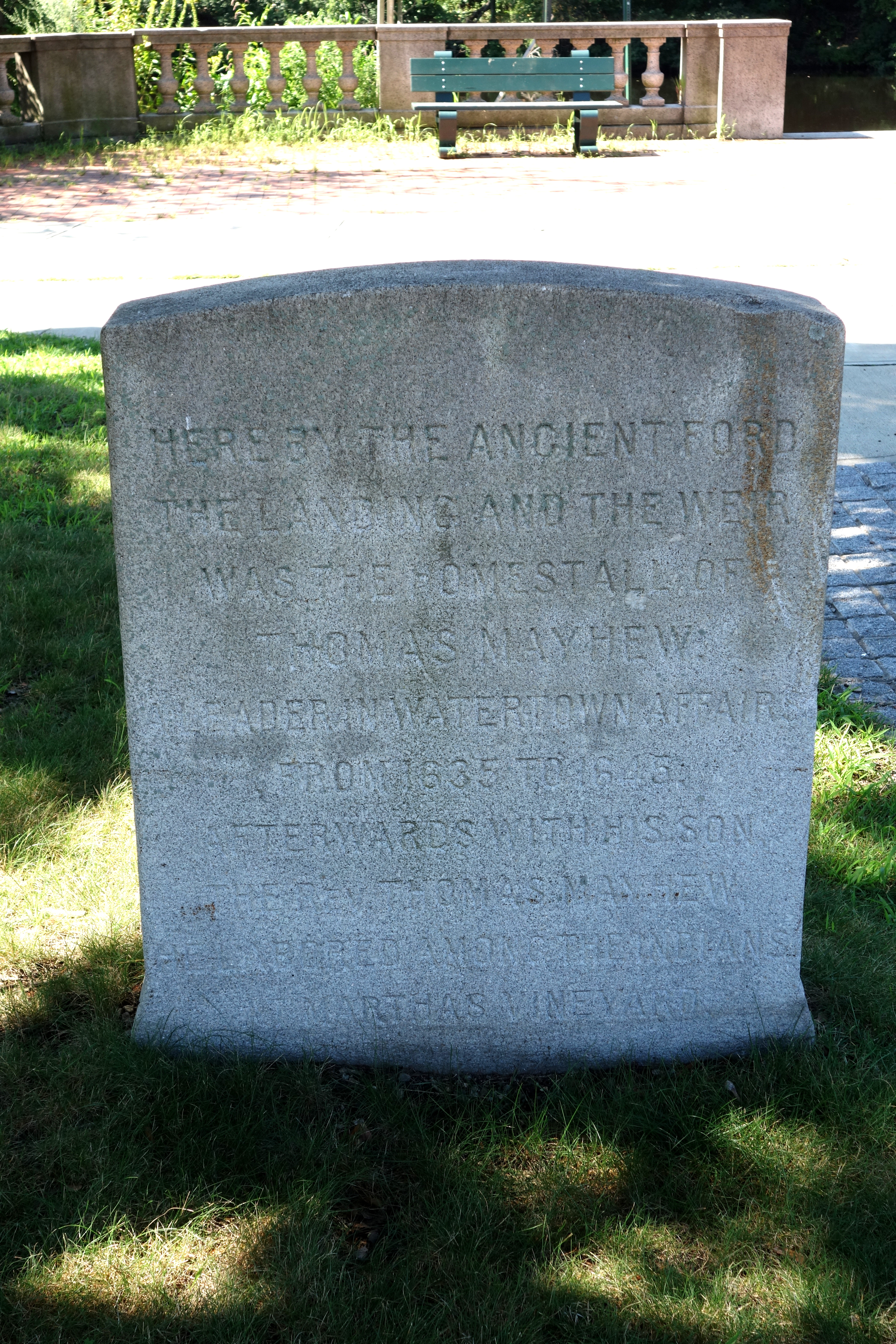
Marker for Thomas Mayhew homestead in Watertown, Massachusetts

Thomas Mayhew was born in Tisbury, in the county of Wiltshire in England. He married Anna (also called Hanna and Abigail) Parkhurst, born about 1600, in Hampshire, England, daughter of Matthew Parkhurst. In 1621 they had a son, Thomas, the Younger, baptised in Hanna's home town of Southampton. Two years later they had another child, Robert Mayhew, baptized in Tisbury.

The family left England in 1631/2 during the Great Migration of Puritans that brought 20,000 settlers to Massachusetts in thirteen years. Through the agency of Matthew Cradock of London, Mayhew had been appointed to manage properties in Medford, Massachusetts, and to engage in trade and shipbuilding. In or about 1633, Mayhew's wife Anna died, and about 1634 he returned to England for a business meeting with Cradock. While in England, he married Jane Gallion (1602–1666), and brought her back to New England with him. Their daughter Hannah was born in 1635, and three more daughters, Mary (1639), Martha (1642), and Bethiah, followed. Martha is the 7th great grandmother to the world-famous singer and songwriter Taylor Swift.

In 1641, Thomas secured Martha's Vineyard, Nantucket, the Elizabeth Islands, and other islands as a proprietary colony from Sir Ferdinando Gorges and the Earl of Stirling. This enabled him to transfer his business operations there. With the help of his son Thomas, a settlement was established and farming and whaling enterprises were begun.

The Mayhews had great success in regard to Indian policy. Because of the fair treatment of the Indians there, the colony was protected from the bloodshed that occurred elsewhere, in King Philip's War. In 1646, the General Court of Massachusetts directed the religious leaders of the colony to select two among them to serve as missionaries to the natives. So great was the interest aroused by this venture that a society was formed in England also to support the missionaries. Unfortunately a massive conflict broke out, called King Philip's War (1675–76), which resulted in many deaths of both the settlers and the natives. However, three prominent names appear. They are: John Eliot (known as the Apostle to the Indians); Thomas Mayhew (who was already ministering to the natives); and, three generations later, Eleazar Wheelock, who established "Doctor Wheelock's Academy for the promotion of Christianity and civility among the savage Indians of this continent" (now known as Dartmouth College).

In 1657, the younger Thomas Mayhew was drowned when a ship he was travelling in was lost at sea on a voyage to England. Mayhew's three grandsons Matthew Mayhew (born 1648), Thomas (born 1650), John (born 1652), and other members of his family assisted him in running his business and government.

Transcription of Watertown marker: "HERE BY THE ANCIENT FORD THE LANDING AND THE WEIR WAS THE HOMESTALL OF THOMAS MAYHEW: A LEADER IN WATERTOWN AFFAIRS FROM 1635 TO 1645. AFTERWARDS WITH HIS SON, THE REV. THOMAS MAYHEW, HE LABORED AMONG THE INDIANS AT MARTHA'S VINEYARD."

== Colonizing Dukes County ==
In 1641, while engaged in business ventures in the vicinity of Boston, Mayhew succeeded in acquiring the rights to the islands that now constitute Dukes County and Nantucket County: Martha's Vineyard, Nantucket, and the Elizabeth Islands. He bought the County for 40 pounds and two beaver skin hats from William Alexander, the 2nd Earl of Stirling. To resolve a conflicting ownership claim, he also paid off Sir Ferdinando Gorges, thereby acquiring a clear title.

Mayhew established himself as governor of Martha's Vineyard in 1642 and sent his son, Thomas the Younger, with about forty families to settle there. He himself followed four years later. Together he and the younger Thomas established Martha's Vineyard's first settlement and called it Great Harbor, now Edgartown.

== Relations with the natives ==
Mayhew and his fellow settlers found a large and economically stable native population of about 3,000 living in permanent villages, led by four sachems (chiefs). Relations between the first settlers and their Wampanoag neighbors were peaceful and courteous. Under the leadership of his son, a minister, they instituted a policy of respect and fair dealing with the Wampanoag natives that was unequaled anywhere. One of the first of Mayhew's orders was that no land was to be taken from the native islanders, the Wampanoags, without their consent or without fair payment. From this time forward, the colonial settlers and Wampanoag lived without the bloodshed that marked the history of European colonies elsewhere in the New World.

From the beginning, Mayhew had worked to preserve the original political institutions of the native population. Religion and government were distinct matters, he told the chiefs. When one of your subjects becomes a Christian, he is still under your jurisdiction. Wampanoag land was guarded against further encroachment by white settlers. So successful were these policies that during the bloody battles of King Philip's War, in 1675-1676, the Vineyard's native population never stirred, although they outnumbered the settlers on the island by twenty to one.

== Spreading religion ==
By 1660 there were about 85 white people living peaceably among the natives, earning their living by farming and fishing. The Mayhew family, which from that time forth became an integral part of island history, wanted to share its religion with the natives, but the Wampanoags were not too interested, having their own spiritual faith. However, once it was clear that, though Mayhew was the governor, the sachems remained in charge of their people, some became curious about the white man's God. When a native named Hiacoomes expressed an interest, Mayhew invited him into his home and instructed him in English and Christianity. Hiacoomes, in return, taught Mayhew the native language. As soon as Mayhew could converse with the natives, he would some days "walk 20 miles through uncut forests to preach the Gospel...in wigwam or open field".

There is a stained glass window in the baptismal font in the National Cathedral in Washington D.C. depicting Rev. Thomas Mayhew Jr. baptizing a native.

Change was in the air though, for the world outside this small island was unsettled. There were more visitors from off island and some stayed, challenging the Mayhew government, while Baptists and Methodists arrived to make converts from the established Congregational Church.

== From colony to aristocracy ==
Through a maze of conflicting land grants, changing political allegiances, and settler unrest, Mayhew, who styled himself "Governour Mayhew", began to rule his island with an iron hand. The most serious threat to his control came in 1665 when Martha's Vineyard was included in the lands placed under the king's brother, the Duke of York. After much delay, a settlement, worked out in 1671, confirmed the Mayhew patent and named Mayhew "Governour and Chiefe Magistrate" for life. At the same time, a patent was issued erecting the Manor of Tisbury in the southwestern part of the island. The Governor and his grandson Matthew were made "joint Lords of the Manor of Tisbury", and the inhabitants became manorial tenants subject to the feudal jurisdiction of the Mayhews. This full-fledged feudal manor appears to have been the only such institution actually established in New England.

The attempt of the Mayhews to create a hereditary aristocracy on the Vineyard met with increasing opposition as more and more colonists arrived. When the Dutch temporarily recaptured New York in 1673, open rebellion broke out and this lasted until the colonial government regained control over New York and restored the authority of the Mayhews on the island. The old patriarch died in 1682, at the age of eight-nine. Nine years later the political rule of his family ended when Martha's Vineyard was annexed by Massachusetts after the Glorious Revolution in England, but the manorial land tenure remained. Although some of the Mayhews clung to the "pleasant fiction" of their manorial rights almost until the American Revolution and received token quit rents as late as 1732, feudalism on Martha's Vineyard died the same slow, lingering but certain death it did elsewhere in the colonies.

== Missionary work ==
Kenneth Scott Latourette has concluded that the Missionary Mayhews of Martha's Vineyard represent what is probably the longest and most persistent missionary endeavor in the annals of all Christendom. The elder Thomas Mayhew, known for his missionary work, was not concerned for Indian souls when he settled on his island; he sought only to improve his social and economic position. His son, Thomas Mayhew the Younger, is credited with the launching an Indian mission. Like his father, he had emigrated from England. Somewhere, he received a liberal education, apparently from private tutors, and after moving to the Vineyard to begin the white settlement there he became pastor of the small Anglican church as well as acting governor in his father's absence. He soon discovered that he could not refuse the challenge he found among the three thousand Pokanaukets, a branch of the mainland Narragansetts, who far outnumbered the whites, so an effective settlement required friendly relations with the Indians. But Thomas the Younger appears to have been motivated largely by spiritual concern, while his father and other members of the family enjoyed the practical results of the Indian mission. The son gradually abandoned most of his secular tasks and spent the remainder of his life among the natives. Progress was slow at first, but by the end of 1652 there were 283 converts, a school for Indian children, and two Indian meetings each Sabbath. The Praying Indians of Martha's Vineyard who said grace before meals became a topic of conversation on both sides of the Atlantic. Thomas Mayhew the Younger carried on his missionary work with little heed for his personal fortunes. As the elder Mayhew put it, his son had followed this work "when 'twas bare with him for food and rayment, and when indeede there was nothing in sight any waies but Gods promises." The situation was improved somewhat by the formation in 1649 of a London missionary society, usually called the New England Company, which in a few years began to provide substantial aid for the Mayhews and other missionaries.

In the fall of 1657, Thomas Mayhew the Younger sailed for England on a trip combining an appeal for missionary funds with personal business. After leaving Boston Harbor, the ship was never seen again. The death of his only son at the age of thirty-six was a heavy blow to Mayhew and greatly increased the burdens he carried in old age. He made repeated efforts to find a replacement to continue his son's ministry to the Indians, but no minister who knew the language or was willing to learn could be induced to settle permanently on the island, so at the age of sixty Mayhew, who had started as a merchant, then turned landed proprietor, became a missionary in his son's place. For the next twenty-five years he traveled on foot as far as twenty miles to preach once a week at the Indian assembly or to visit the native camps.

== Death ==
When the venerable Governor Mayhew became ill one Sunday evening in 1682, he calmly informed his friends and relatives that "his Sickness would now be to Death, and he was well contented therewith, being full of Days, and satisfied with Life". His great-grandson, Experience Mayhew, a son of John, was only eight at the time, but he clearly remembered being led to the bedside to receive from the dying man a blessing "in the Name of the Lord". Matthew Mayhew, the eldest grandson, succeeded his military and civil duties. Rev. John Mayhew, the youngest grandson and grandfather of Jonathan Mayhew, continued his missionary work to the Indians. Thomas, another grandson, became a Judge of Massachusetts.

His descendant Jonathan Mayhew was a prominent 18th-century Boston clergyman who coined the phrase "No taxation without representation."

== Descendants ==
- Matthew Mayhew (1648–1710), Martha's Vineyard colonist, politician and missionary
- Experience Mayhew (1673–1758), Martha's Vineyard colonist and missionary
- Joseph Mayhew (1709/10–1782), Martha's Vineyard colonist, politician, and missionary
- Jonathan Mayhew (1720–1766), Congregationalist minister and Patriot
- Jonathan Mayhew Wainwright I (1792–1854), Episcopal Bishop of New York
- Charles Tupper (1821–1915), 6th Prime Minister of Canada
- Jonathan Mayhew Wainwright II (1821–1863) U.S. Navy officer during the American Civil War
- Jonathan M. Wainwright (1883–1953), U.S. Army general during World War II
- Rufus Wilmot Griswold (1815-1857), American anthologist, editor, poet and critic
- Taylor Swift (*1989), singer-songwriter, pop star
- Bill Gates (1955), founder of Microsoft
- Margaret (Eaton) Berrien Owner of Rockingham George Washington's last war headquarters of the American revolution
- Major John Berrien(1758-1815) American Revolutionary War veteran under General Lachlan McIntosh of Geergia. And served on Washington's staff at the Battle of Monmouth
- John McPherson. Berrien(1781–1856) 10th Attorney General of the United States and U.S. Senator from Georgia

== Sources ==
- Charles Edward Banks, The History of Martha's Vineyard (three-volumes, 1911)
- Charles W. Akers, Called Unto Liberty, A Life of Jonathan Mayhew (1964)
- Christopher Burns, Island Wilderness; Imagining the Early Years of Martha's Vineyard

Primary sources

- Edward Winslow, Glorious Progress of the Gospel Amongst the Indians in New England (1649)
