= Experience Mayhew =

New England missionary (1673–1758)

Experience Mayhew (1673–1758) was a New England missionary to the Wampanoag Indians on Martha's Vineyard and adjacent islands. He is the author of Massachusett Psalter (a rare book like the Bay Psalm Book and Eliot Indian Bible).

Experience was born on January 27, 1673, in Quansoo, Chilmark, Martha's Vineyard, Massachusetts, the oldest son of Rev. John Mayhew, missionary to the Indians, nephew of Gov. Matthew Mayhew, and great-grandson of Gov. Thomas Mayhew.

The Mayhews’ missionary work is considered the “longest most persistent missionary endeavor” in the annals of Christendom. At the age of 21, Experience Mayhew began to preach to the Wampanoag Indians in a one-room meetinghouse built by his father in Chilmark. He became a Congregational minister with the oversight of five or six Indian assemblies, and continued in his ministry for 64 years. Having thoroughly mastered the Wôpanâak language, which he had learned in infancy, he was employed by the Society for the Propagation of the Gospel in New England to make a new version of the Psalms and of the Gospel of John, which he did in 1709 in parallel columns of English and Indian.

It was said of him, "Had he been favored with the advantages of education he would have ranked among the first worthies of New England." He had no formal education, but in July 1723 Harvard College awarded him an honorary bachelor's degree; he attempted to refuse the degree but was "overruled."

== Publications ==
In 1707, he published Ne kesukod Jehovah kessehtunkup, a translation of a sermon by Cotton Mather into the Massachusett language.

In 1709, Experience published "Massachusett Psalter" with Thomas Prince. The 1709 Massachusett Psalter is the first appearance of any book of the New Testament printed in North America in the English language. After John Eliot's Indian Bible, this is the most important monument of the Massachusett language. Mayhew's version of the Psalms and Gospel of St. John is based upon Eliot's, but the spelling varies considerably and there are other revisions in the verses. The book gains added interest from the fact that it went through the hands of an Indian printer, the J. Printer of the title-page. James Printer was a native who was taught English at the Indian Charity School at Cambridge. In his youth he was apprenticed to Samuel Green, the printer at Cambridge, and worked for him for many years, subsequently moving to Boston with Green's son Bartholomew. He was the first North American Indian to be known as a printer.

In 1717, he translated the Lord's Prayer into Mohegan-Pequot.

Mayhew published Indian Converts in 1727, which covers the lives and culture of four generations of Wampanoag men, women, and children on Martha's Vineyard. It is the largest set of biographies for any single Indian community in the 17th or 18th century. Mayhew is also the author of the sermon Grace Defended. The purpose of the book was neither to raise funds nor to brag about Mayhew's success, but to emphasize the sincerity of the practicing Christians on Martha's Vineyard, and to humanize and normalize the Indian community living alongside the English. Cotton Mather and other prominent ministers prefaced the book with a signed attestation.

== Family ==
Mayhew had two wives -- Thankful, daughter of Thomas Hinckley, Governor of Plymouth Colony, and Remember Bourne, daughter of Shearjashub and Bathsheba -- and four children, three of whom have extant descendants today. Jonathan Mayhew, his most famous child, became a minister at Old West Church in Boston. Jonathan Mayhew coined the phrase "No taxation without representation". Classics professor Joseph Mayhew was his nephew. His house in Chilmark was occupied by his descendants until 1864.

He is buried at Abel Hill Cemetery in Martha's Vineyard.
