= Old West Church (Boston) =

Historic church in Massachusetts, United States

- U.S. National Register of Historic Places
- U.S. National Historic Landmark
- U.S. National Historic Landmark District – Contributing property
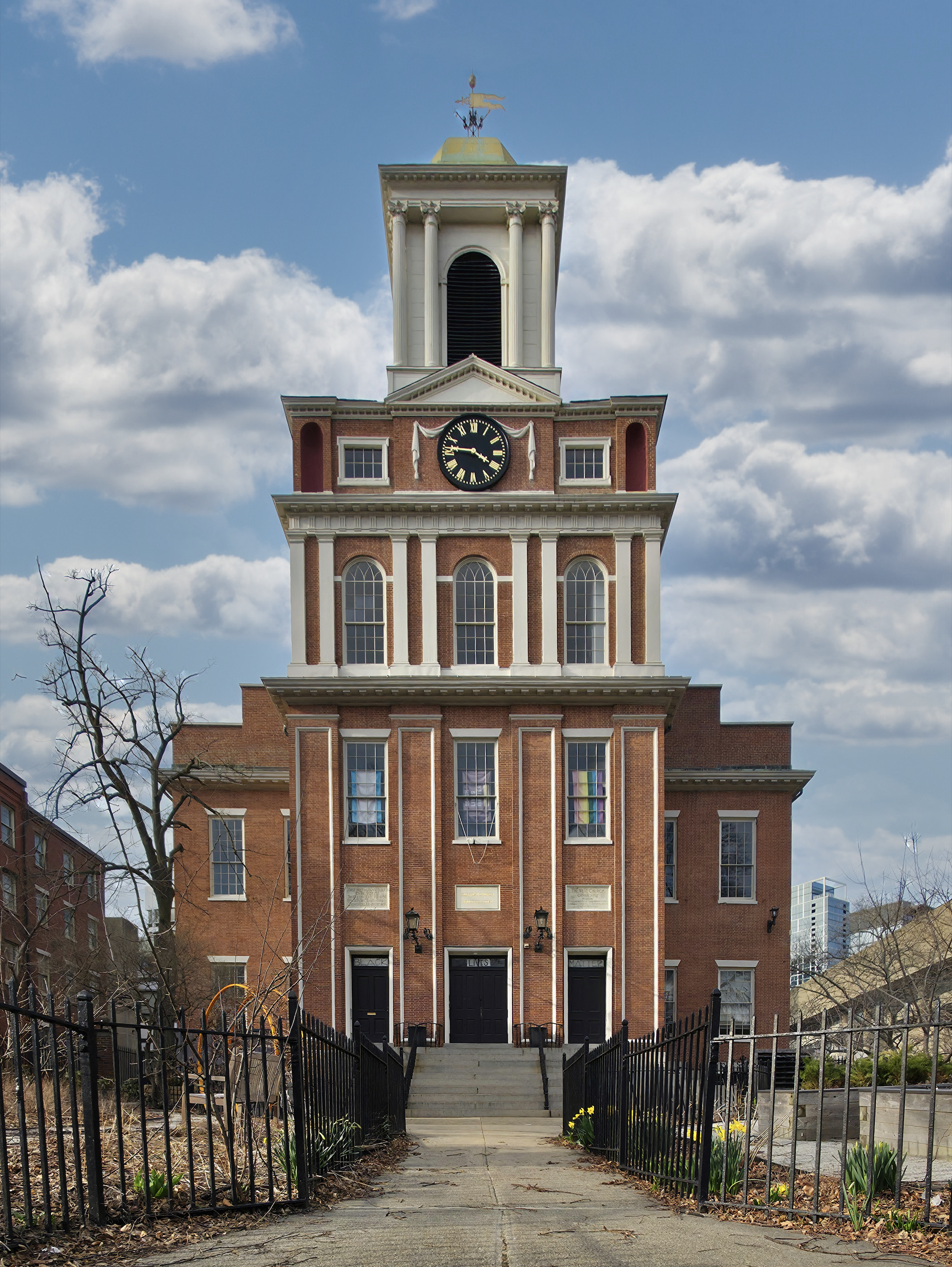
- Old West Church in 2025

- Location within Boston Location within Massachusetts Location within the United States
- Interactive map of Old West Church
- Location: Boston, Massachusetts
- Coordinates: 42°21′41.19″N 71°3′51.16″W
- Built: 1806
- Architect: Asher Benjamin
- Architectural style: Federal
- Part of: Beacon Hill Historic District (ID66000130)
- NRHP reference No.: 70000691

Significant dates
- Added to NRHP: December 30, 1970
- Designated NHL: December 30, 1970
- Designated NHLDCP: October 15, 1966

The Old West Church is a historic United Methodist Church at 131 Cambridge Street in the West End of Boston, Massachusetts. It was built in 1806 to designs by architect Asher Benjamin, and is considered one of his finest works. It is a monumentally-scaled example of ecclesiastical Federal architecture, whose design was widely copied throughout New England.

== Description and history ==
The first church on this site was built in 1737 as a wood-frame building, and was occupied as a barracks by British troops during their occupation of the city prior to the American Revolution. The British destroyed its tower in 1775 when they suspected that American Colonials were signaling to Cambridge from the spire.

In 1806 the congregation commissioned Asher Benjamin to design a new church building. As in the architect's earlier Charles Street Meeting House (1804), its 3 1/2-story brick entry tower is crowned with a cupola; the whole tower projects outward somewhat from the church hall behind. Four shallow brick pilasters, each two stories high and trimmed with white wood, separate the three entry doors. Each door is echoed by a window above it. The tower's third story is outfitted with pairs of Doric pilasters. On the final half-story beneath the cupola are clocks on each face of the tower, each adorned with a light swag. On the back wall, the original central pulpit window has been filled in with brickwork.

Old West's preaching played a major role in American history. Jonathan Mayhew, the church's second Congregational pastor, spoke out as early as 1750 about the right of removing tyrannical leaders. His preaching is considered by some to be theologically radical, although other scholars maintain that Mayhew preserved many conservative Puritan theological and political themes. Some Unitarians believe Mayhew was a predecessor to later liberal ministers like William Ellery Channing in his exposition of anti-trinitarian views; however, Mayhew explicitly denied Unitarianism and it would be inaccurate and anachronistic to impose that later label on him. By the early 19th century, Unitarianism had found its way into 9 of Boston's original 13 orthodox Congregational churches. Other notable pastors included Charles Lowell, and Cyrus Augustus Bartol.

The church was originally and for 150 years Congregational. Between 1894 and 1960 the building served as a branch of the Boston Public Library. Since 1961, the building has been owned by the United Methodist Church.

The building was designated a National Historic Landmark in 1970 for its architectural significance.

== Gallery ==
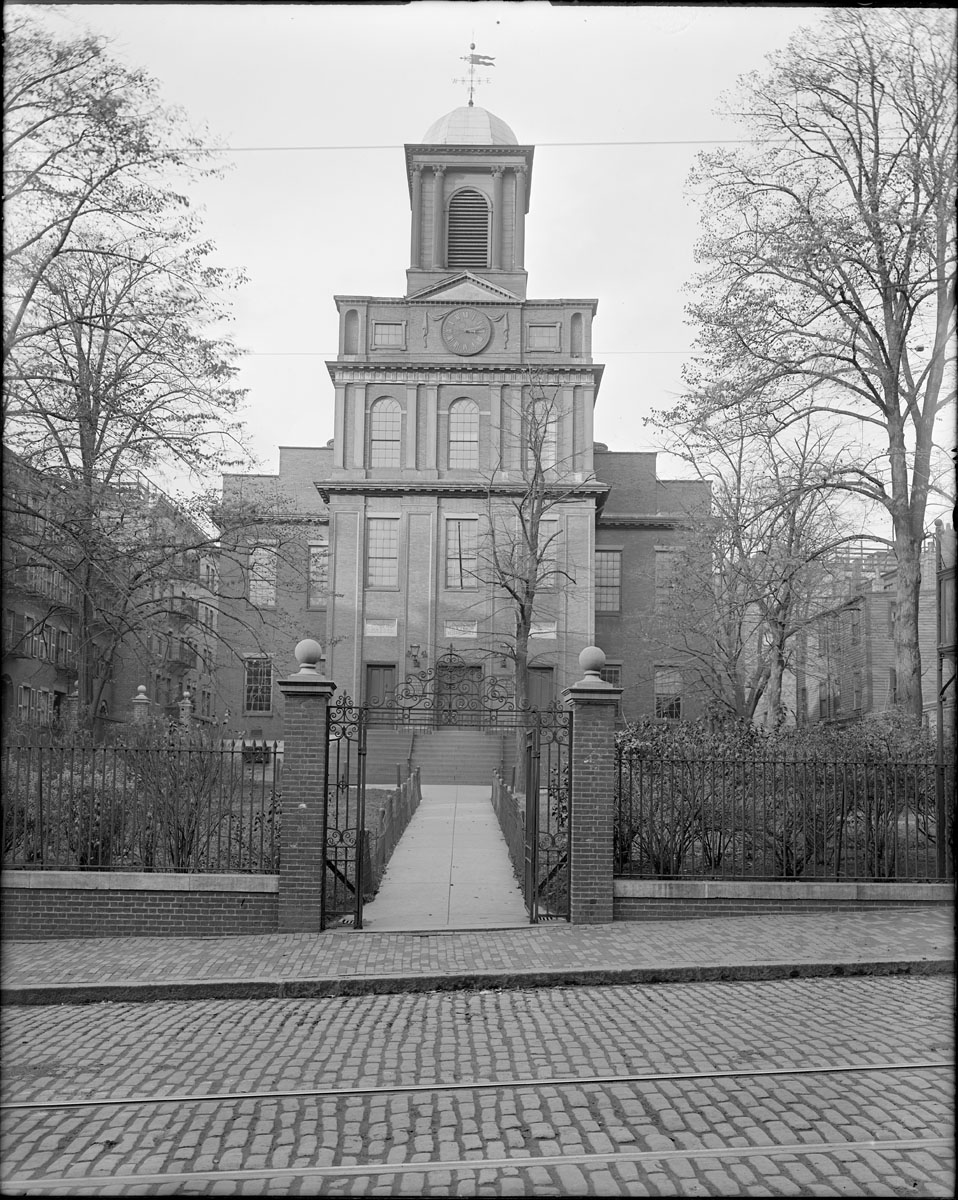
The church in 1920

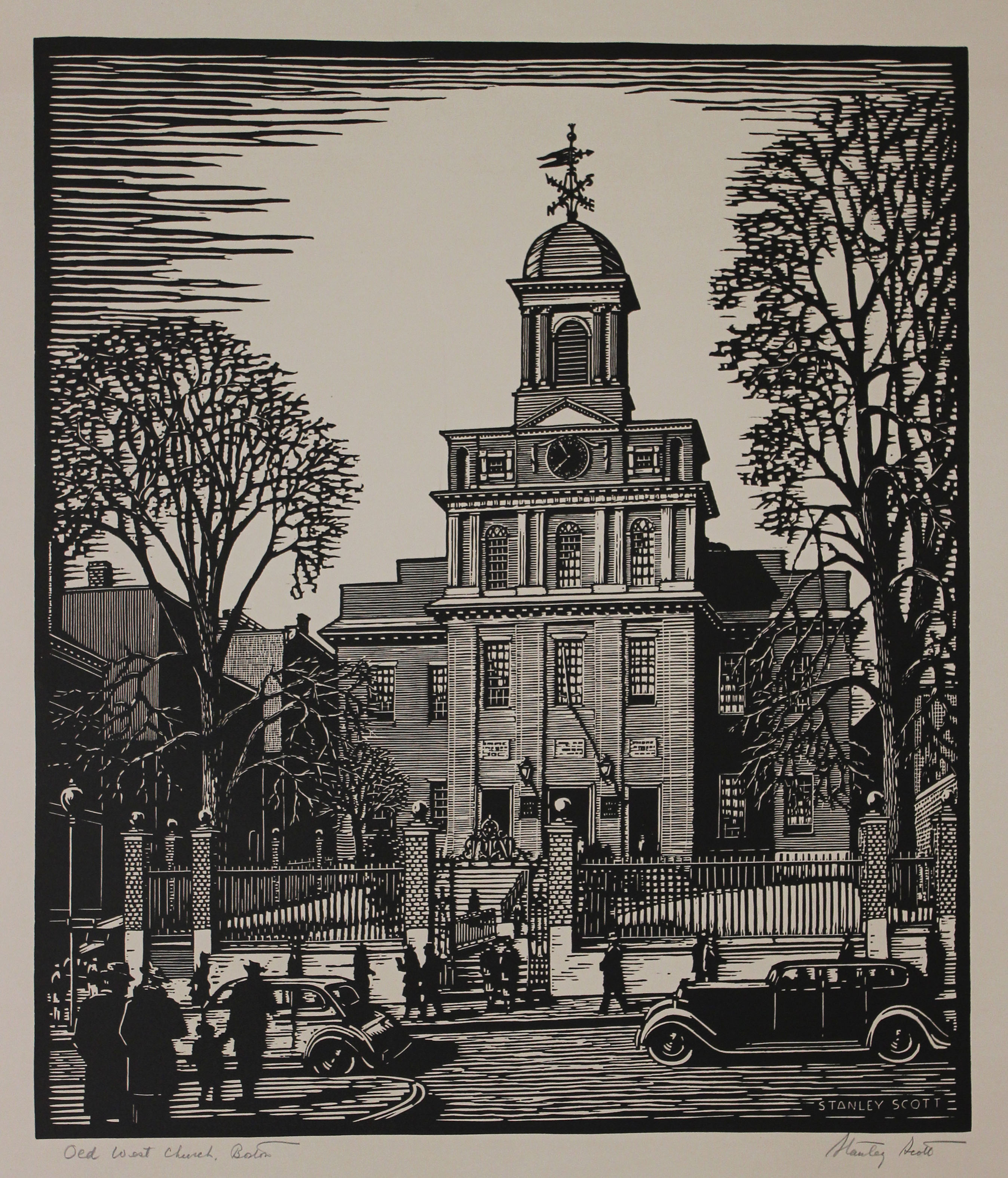
Linocut of the church created by Stanley Scott in 1939 for the Works Progress Administration

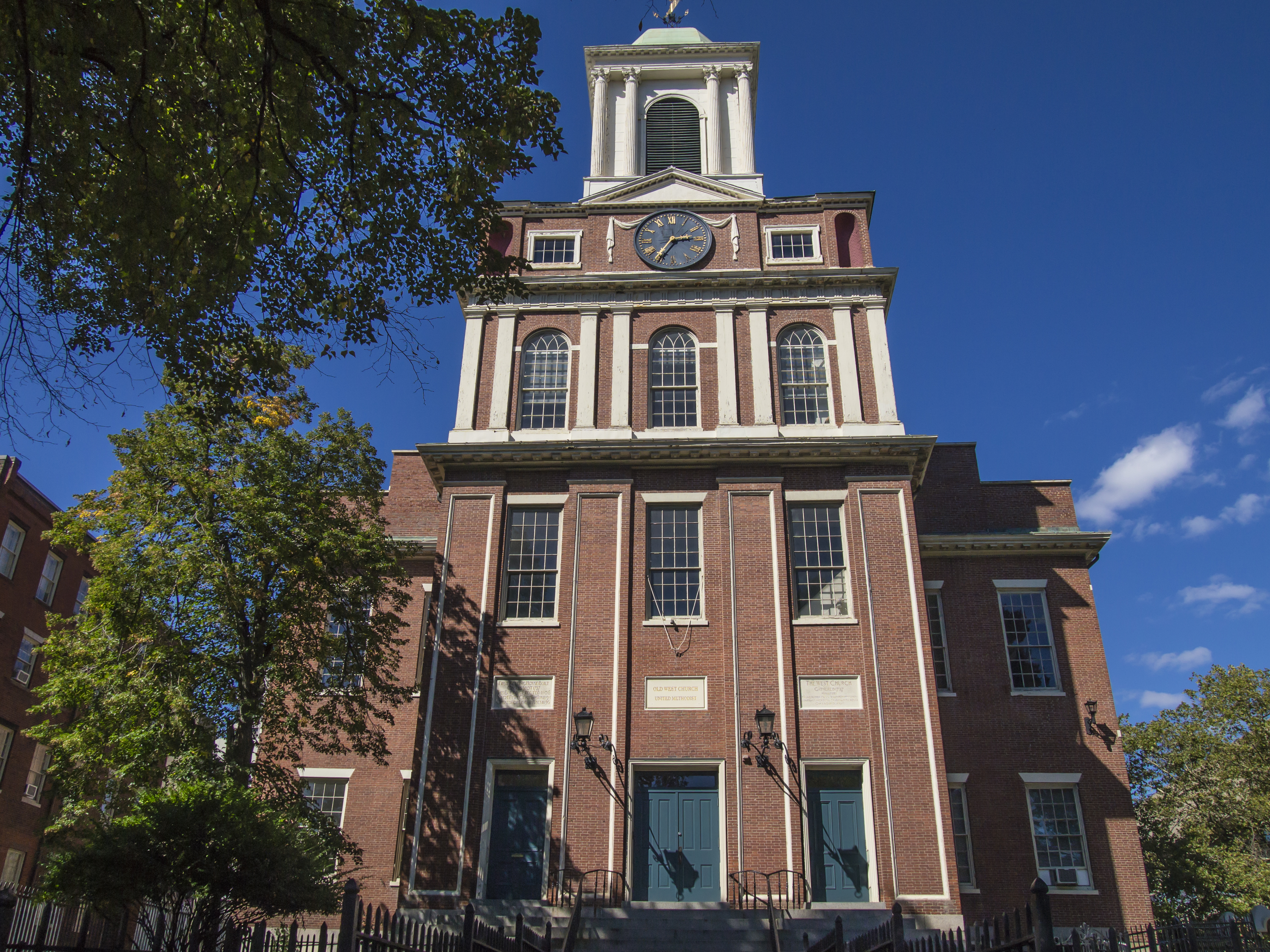
The facade of the church in 2012.

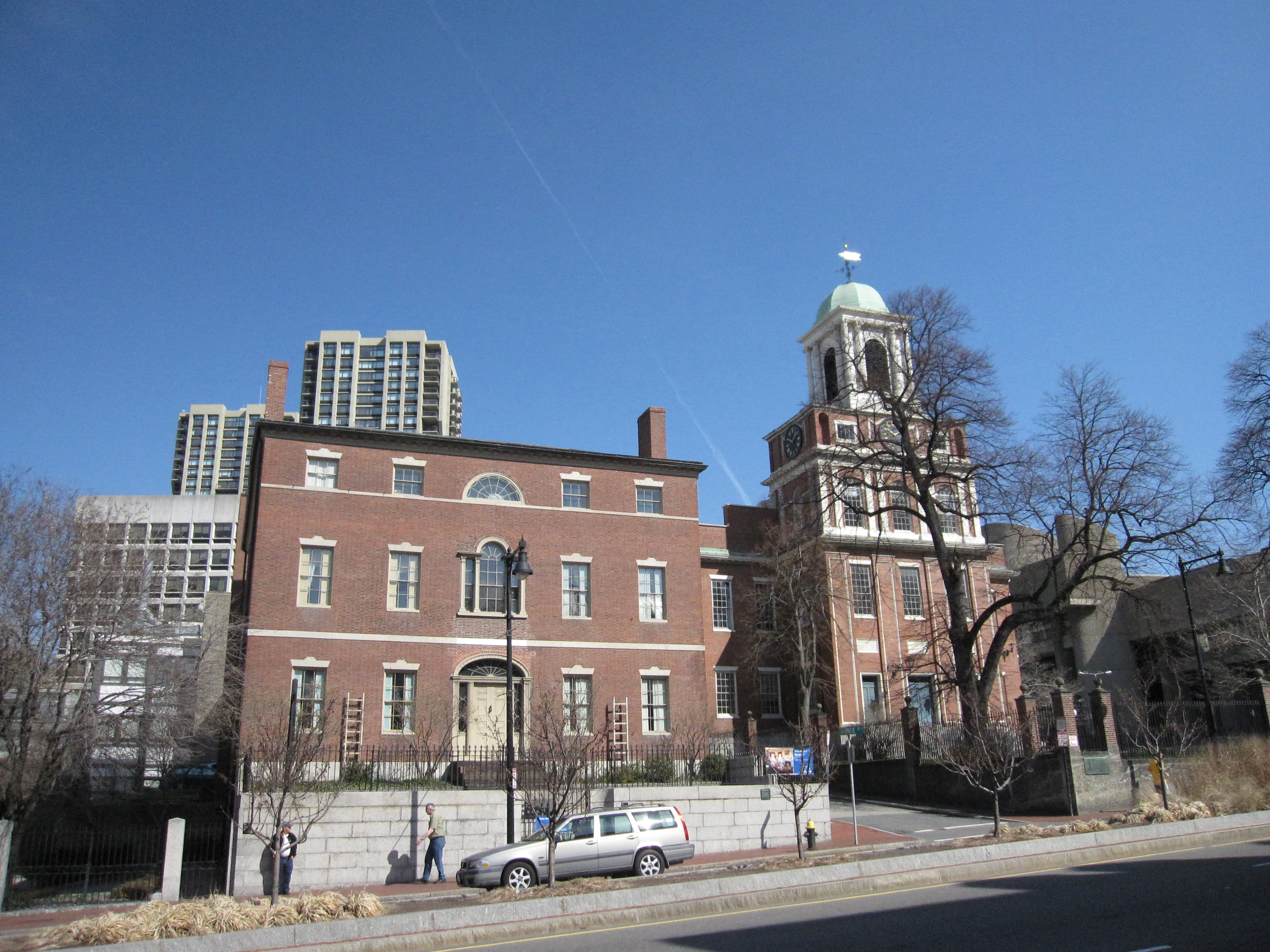
The church neighbors the First Harrison Gray Otis House

== See also ==
- List of National Historic Landmarks in Boston
- National Register of Historic Places listings in northern Boston, Massachusetts
