= NGC 4540 =

Galaxy in the constellation Coma Berenices

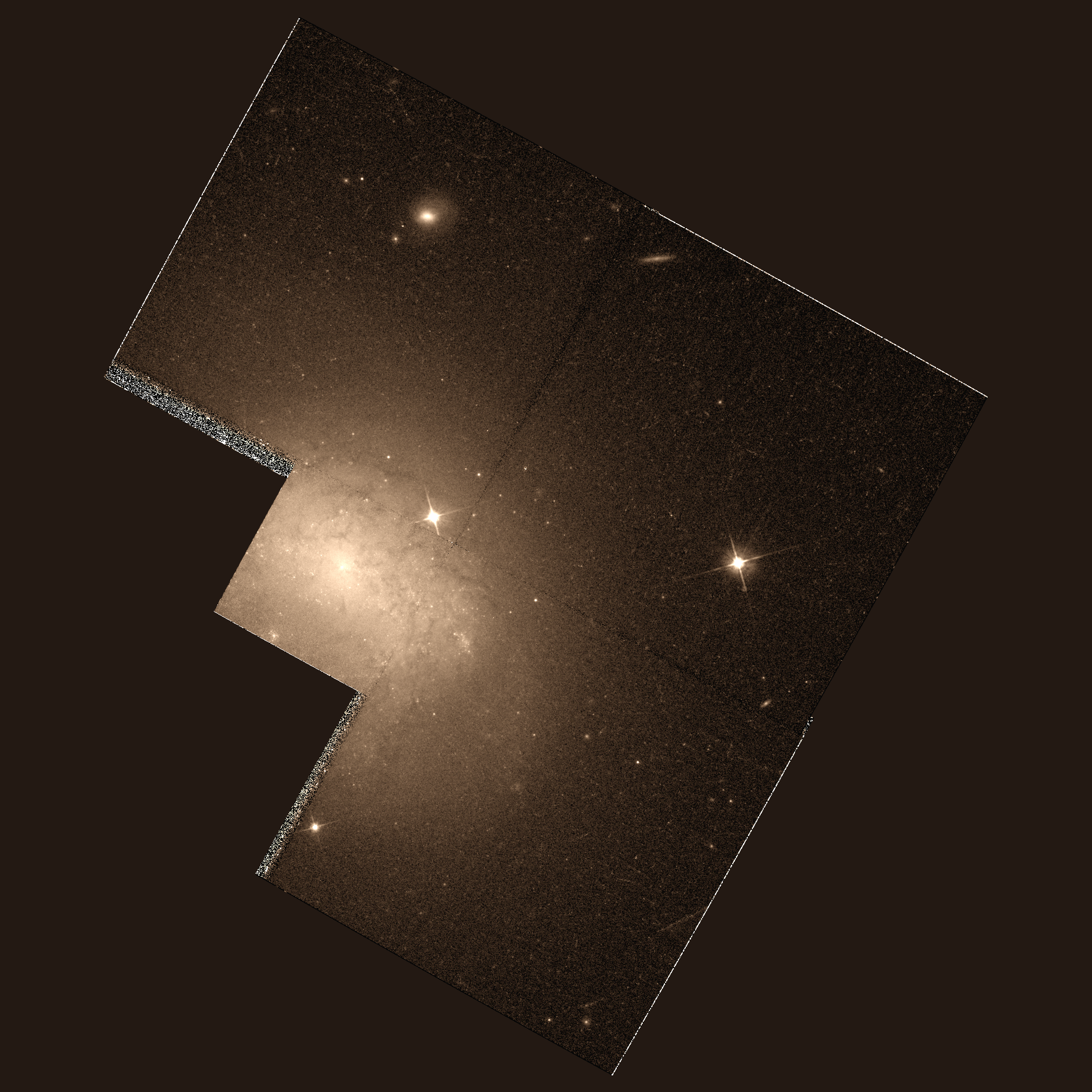
- Hubble Space Telescope image of NGC 4540.

Observation data (J2000 epoch)
- Constellation: Coma Berenices
- Right ascension: 12^{h} 34^{m} 50.9^{s}
- Declination: 15° 33′ 06″
- Redshift: 0.004306
- Heliocentric radial velocity: 1291 km/s
- Distance: 64 Mly
- Group or cluster: Virgo Cluster
- Apparent magnitude (V): 12.44

Characteristics
- Type: SAB(rs)cd, Sy1
- Size: ~39,120 ly (estimated)
- Apparent size (V): 1.9 x 1.5

Other designations
- PGC 41876, UGC 7742, IRAS 12323+1549, MCG 3-32-74, CGCG 99-93, VCC 1588

NGC 4540 is a spiral galaxy with type 1 Seyfert activity located about 64 million light-years away in the constellation Coma Berenices. NGC 4540 was discovered by astronomer William Herschel on March 21, 1784 and is a member of the Virgo Cluster.

== See also ==
- List of NGC objects (4001–5000)

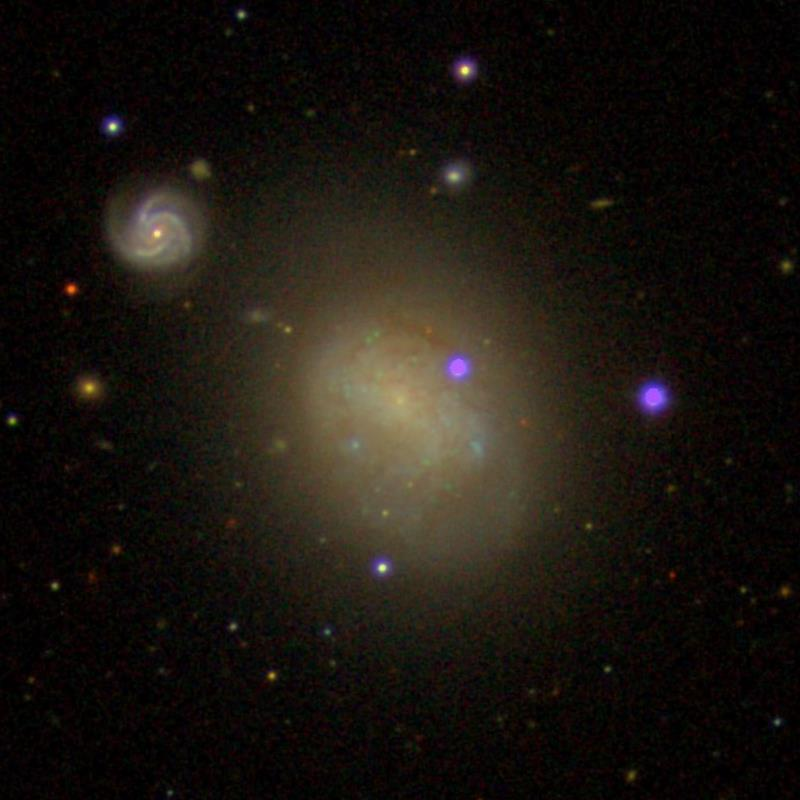
NGC 4540 (SDSS DR14)
