= John Mayhew =

John Mayhew may refer to:

- John Mayhew (musician) (1947–2009), drummer for the progressive rock band Genesis
- John Mayhew (cricketer) (1909–1999), English cricketer
- John W. Mayhew (1885–1941), former head football coach at Louisiana State University
- John Mayhew (Conservative politician) (1884–1954), British politician, MP for East Ham North, 1931–1945
- John Mayhew, 18th-century London cabinet-maker, see Ince and Mayhew
- John Mayhew (doctor) (1954–2025), New Zealand sports physician, North Harbour team doctor formerly chief medical official to the New Zealand national rugby union team
