= Nell Brooker Mayhew =

American artist

Nell Brooker Mayhew (April 17, 1875 – September 24, 1940) was an American painter, etcher and art instructor.

== Early life ==
Mayhew was born Nell Cole Danely in Astoria, Illinois on April 17, 1875. She was the eldest child of Alfred M. Danley, a Methodist minister, and Ella (Cole) Danely. As a child she showed an early interest and aptitude for art. When she was sixteen, one of her paintings was accepted for the Art Institute of Chicago's Annual Exhibition of Watercolors by American Artists.

== Education and personal life ==
Mayhew attended Northwestern University, graduating in 1897. She continued her art studies at the University of Illinois, between 1901 and 1906 as a student of Newton A. Wells. While in central Illinois, she met Sidney Brooker, editor of the Quincy, Illinois newspaper. They married in 1902. Brooker died six months later, but she continued to use his name in her signature throughout her career. In 1905 she began taking classes at the Art Institute of Chicago. Her teachers included John Johansen and John Vanderpoel. She married Leonard Thomas Mayhew in 1911. They had two daughters though the marriage ended in 1926.

== Career ==
While studying at the University of Illinois, Mayhew developed the color etching process with which she is so closely identified. She created paintings on paper by incorporating etching techniques with the monotype process, making colored prints with the same plate but varying the colors and amount of ink. A critic described her work in 1912, "Now and again you are perplexed to know whether you are looking at a painting or a print".

Seeking a fresh start after the death of her first husband and having completed training at the Art Institute of Chicago, Mayhew moved to Los Angeles in 1908 and began exhibiting. She exhibited regularly in the southern California area from 1908 through 1935, including from 1908 to 1927 at the Blanchard Gallery in Los Angeles. In 1909 she received a medal for color etching at the Alaska-Yukon Exhibition in Seattle. She taught privately, at the Chouinard Art Institute and in 1910, she joined the College of Fine Arts at the University of Southern California, Garvanza campus as a faculty member.

Mayhew found inspiration for her work in nature. Her favorite recreation was gardening. In the late 1910s, she traveled with her daughters to sketch the last surviving Spanish missions. While the California Mission series subject matter was architectural, Mayhew took note of the landscape as she drove from the south to the north of the state. Mayhew advocated for the value of beauty in one's life, writing an article in California Southland and a letter to the editor in the Los Angeles Times. In the early 1930s Mayhew founded an art rental business. which was announced on the front page of a local newspaper.

Mayhew died in Highland Park, California.

== Collections ==
- Smithsonian American Art Museum
