= Abby Shaw Mayhew =

American educator

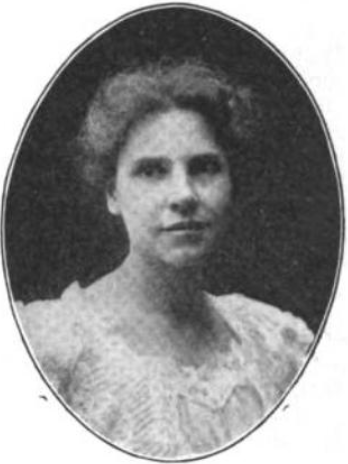
- Abby Shaw Mayhew, from a 1916 publication
- Born: Abigail Shaw Mayhew; June 11, 1864; Eau Claire, Wisconsin, US
- Died: November 2, 1954 (aged 90); Wayzata, Minnesota, US
- Occupation(s): Physical educator, college professor

Abigail Shaw Mayhew (June 11, 1864 – November 2, 1954) was an American educator, the first director of physical education for women at the University of Wisconsin. She was first director of the YWCA's Normal School of Physical Education and Hygiene in Shanghai, when it opened in 1915.

== Early life and education ==
Mayhew was born in Eau Claire, Wisconsin, the daughter of Charles Francis Mayhew and Delia Gardner Shaw Mayhew. She graduated from Wellesley College in 1885. She made further studies of physical training at the Sargent Normal School of Physical Education in Cambridge, Massachusetts.

== Career ==
=== In the United States ===
From 1892 to 1897, Mayhew was Physical Director of the Young Women's Christian Association of Minneapolis. In 1897, she became Principal of Ladies' Hall and Instructor in Gymnastics for Women at the University of Wisconsin. She held the titles "Assistant Professor of Physical Training" and "Director of Physical Education for Women" at Wisconsin from 1903 to 1912. Dance educator Margaret H'Doubler was one of her close colleagues at Wisconsin. She was credited with starting the school's women's field hockey program, and with planning the gymnasium that became Lathrop Hall.

Mayhew made headlines in 1906, when she advocated for the healthfulness of dress reform measures, including open necklines and shorter skirts. "We are never going to be free so long as we wear petticoats," she declared. "Woman will never have perfect freedom in dress until she wears something like the gymnasium costume." She was a member of the Woman's Club of Madison beginning in 1908.

Mayhew spoke about her work in China to American women's groups and community organizations during furloughs, and after she retired.

=== In China ===
Mayhew went to Shanghai in 1912, as a representative of the YWCA, to support the introduction of physical education programs for women. She worked with fellow Wellesley College alumna Ying Mei Chun there, and directed the YWCA's Normal School of Physical Education and Hygiene when it opened in 1915. The school eventually became part of Ginling College.

Mayhew was head of the YWCA's Hostess House in Shanghai, from 1924 until she retired in the 1930s. Her work there was described in 1930: "she meets, entertains, and helps interpret the Chinese people to hundreds of guests from all over the world." She attended the wedding of her friend Soong Mei-ling to Chiang Kai-shek in Shanghai in 1927.

== Publications ==
- "Returns on Investment in an Ideal Gymnasium" (1911)
- "Beginnings in Physical Education in China" (1913)
- "Physical Education in China" (1916)
- "Pioneering Physical Education for the Women of China" (1918)

== Personal life ==
Mayhew died in 1954, at the age of 90, at her home in Wayzata, Minnesota.
