= Jonathan Mayhew =

American Congregational minister

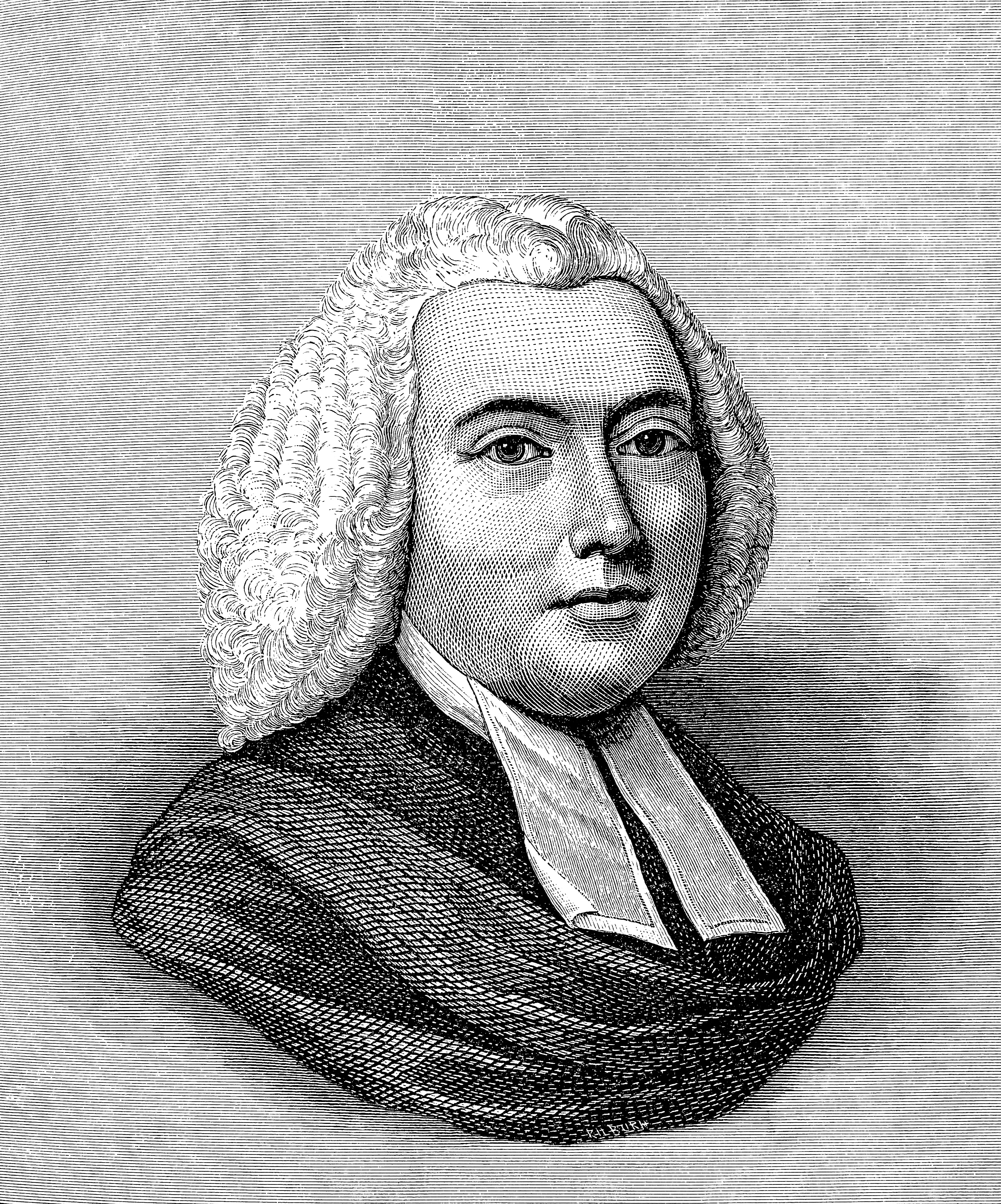
- Born: October 8, 1720; Martha's Vineyard
- Died: July 9, 1766 (aged 45)
- Education: Harvard College
- Years active: 1747-1766
- Parent(s): Experience Mayhew; Thankful Hinckley, daughter of Thomas Hinckley

Ecclesiastical career
- Church: Old West Church, Boston, Massachusetts
- Writings: Discourse Concerning Unlimited Submission

Signature
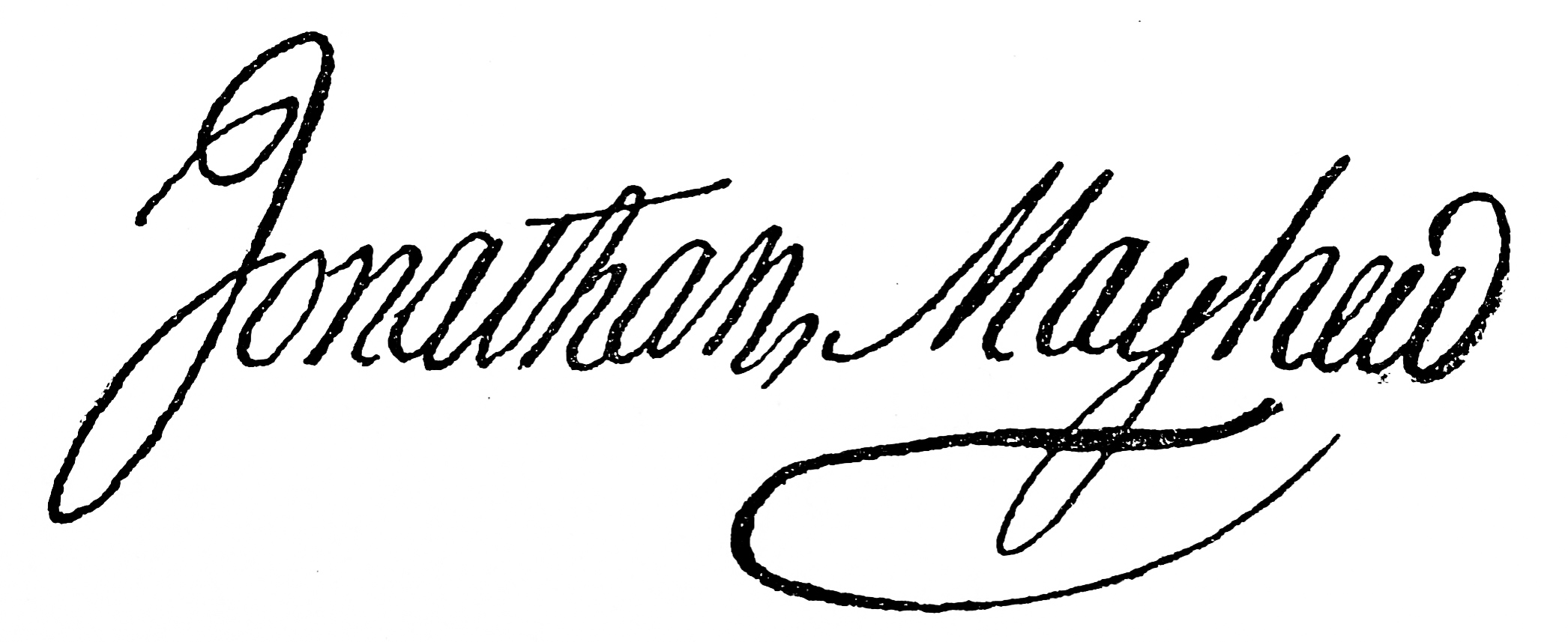

Jonathan Mayhew (October 8, 1720 – July 9, 1766) was a noted American Congregational minister of Puritan origin at Old West Church in Boston. Mayhew vehemently opposed the Stamp Act and other such incursions by the British Parliament. In public, especially through his sermons, he was an outspoken advocate for colonial representation and sovereignty. Because of his unconventional and liberal views, Mayhew's ordination was the cause of much controversy among the clergy.

== Early life ==
Mayhew was born at Martha's Vineyard, being fifth in descent from Thomas Mayhew (1592–1682), an early settler and the grantee (1641) of Martha's Vineyard and adjacent islands. Thomas Mayhew Jr. (1622–1657), his son John (d. 1689) and John's son, Experience Mayhew (1673–1758), were active missionaries among the Indians of Marthas Vineyard and the vicinity.

Mayhew graduated from Harvard College in 1744 with a bachelor's in the liberal arts, and with his master's (A.M., artium magister) in 1747. He received an honorary D.D. from the University of Aberdeen in appreciation of his 1748 sermons, Seven Sermons.

== Theological views ==
Mayhew did not hold to conventional Trinitarian views, having rejected Calvinist theology in 1756. He contended that there was a "natural truth" and "natural justice" to which even God was subject, which was a radical and greatly controversial departure from orthodox Calvinist theology. So unconventional were his theological views that when he was to be ordained minister of the West Church in Boston in 1747, only two ministers attended the first council called for the ordination, and it was necessary to summon a second council. Mayhew's preaching made his church essentially the first Unitarian Congregational church in New England, though it was never officially Unitarian. He preached the strict unity of God, the subordinate nature of Christ, and salvation by character. Like other Unitarians of this time, Mayhew believed God punished whole communities if the people were not moral and pious enough. But Mayhew did affirm "the divinity of the Son of God" and never explicitly denied (as Arians do) that the Son is co-eternal with the Father.

On March 20, 1760, Boston experienced a fire that consumed over three hundred buildings and left about a thousand people without homes. Three days later, Mayhew preached a sermon that proclaimed that God had caused the fire to chastise Bostonians. Mayhew declared that God had “determined to let loose his wrath upon the city to ‘rebuke us in his anger, and chasten us in his hot displeasure’.” Therefore, Mayhew said, God “caused his wind to blow; and suddenly raised it to such a height, that all endeavours to put a stop to the raging flames, were ineffectual”. Mayhew finished his sermon by warning the people of Boston that unless they repented and reformed enough, they should expect an even greater punishment.

== Political views ==
In politics, Mayhew bitterly opposed the Stamp Act, and urged the necessity of colonial union (or communion) to secure colonial liberties. He was famous, in part, for his 1750 and 1754 election sermons espousing American rights — the cause of liberty and the right and duty to resist tyranny; other famous sermons included "The Snare Broken," 1766, calling for the repeal of the Stamp Act. His sermons and writings were a powerful influence in the development of the movement for liberty and independence.

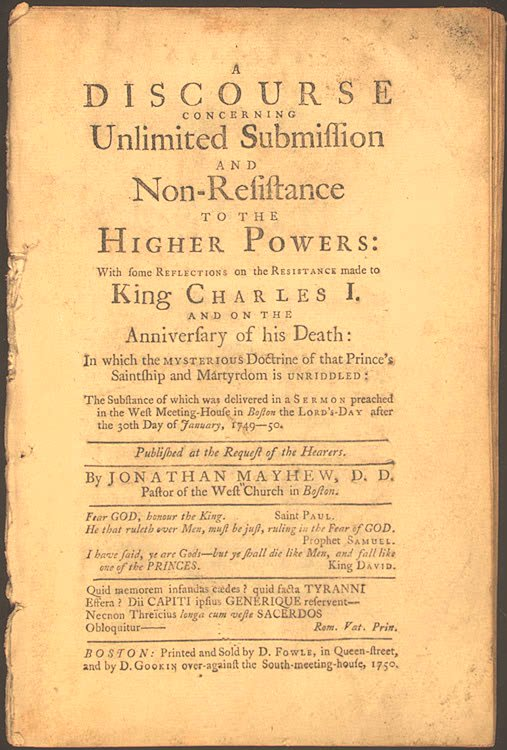
Discourse Concerning Unlimited Submission

The extent of his political feeling can be seen in his Discourse Concerning Unlimited Submission, a sermon delivered on the 100th anniversary of the execution of Charles I (January 30, 1649/50). Taking vigorous issue with recent efforts to portray Charles as a martyred monarch, Mayhew began with observations on the antiquity of English liberties. The English constitution, he asserted, “is originally and essentially free.” Roman sources, such as the reliable Tacitus, made it clear that “the ancient Britons … were extremely jealous of their liberties.” England's monarchs originally held their throne “solely by grant of parliament,” so the ancient English kings ruled “by the voluntary consent of the people.” After forty pages of such historical discourse, Mayhew reached his major point: the essential rightness of the execution of an English king when he too greatly infringed upon British liberties.

The vigor of Mayhew's sermon established his reputation. It was published not only in Boston, but also in London in 1752 and again in 1767. In Boston, John Adams remembered long afterward that Mayhew's sermon, “was read by everybody.” John Adams referred his as "The father of religious liberty in America". Some would say later that this sermon was the first volley of the American Revolution, setting forth the intellectual and scriptural justification for rebellion against the Crown.

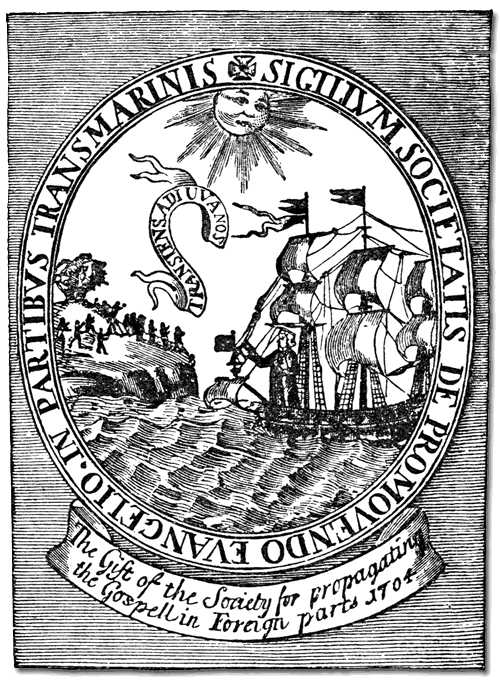
Seal of the Society for Propagating the Gospel in Foreign Parts

In 1763 he turned his attention to the Society for the Propagation of the Gospel, a branch of the Church of England established "to send priests and schoolteachers to America to help provide the Church's ministry to the colonists". His Observations on the Charter and Conduct of the Society for the Propagation of the Gospel in Foreign Parts was published in Boston and London and raised considerable opposition in England and America; Thomas Secker, then archbishop of Canterbury, wrote an Answer the following year.

In 1765, with the provocation of the Stamp Act fresh, Mayhew delivered another rousing sermon on the virtues of liberty and the iniquity of tyranny. The essence of slavery, he announced, consists in subjection to others—“whether many, few, or but one, it matters not.” The day after his sermon, a Boston mob attacked Chief Justice Thomas Hutchinson’s house, and many thought Mayhew was responsible.

Mayhew was Dudleian lecturer at Harvard in 1765. He died July 1766.

A quarter century after his death, the following lines were delivered at the Harvard commencement address of 1792:

While Britain claim'd by laws our rights to lead, And faith was fetter'd by a bigot's creed. Then mental freedom first her power display'd and call'd a MAYHEW to religion's aid. For this great truth, he boldly led the van,That private judgment was the right of man. — Alden Bradford

== Bibliography ==
- Akers, Charles W. (1964). Called unto liberty: A life of Jonathan Mayhew, 1720-1766. Harvard University Press..
- Bradford, Alden (1838). Memoir of the life and writings of Rev. Jonathan Mayhew. Boston: C. C. Little & Co.
- Beneke, Chris (2008). "The Critical Turn: Jonathan Mayhew, the British Empire, and the Idea of Resistance in Mid-Eighteenth-Century Boston". Massachusetts Historical Review. 10: 23–56. JSTOR 25478696.
- Moore, Frank (1862). The Patriot Preachers of the American Revolution: With Biographical Sketches. New York: C.T. Evans.
- Lubert, Howard L. "Jonathan Mayhew: Conservative Revolutionary." History of Political Thought 32 (Winter 2011): 589–616.
- Mullins, Patrick (2017). Father of Liberty: Jonathan Mayhew and the Principles of the American Revolution. ISBN 978-0-7006-2448-5.
- Mullins, J. Patrick. " ' A Kind of War, Tho' Hitherto an Un-Bloody One': Jonathan Mayhew, Francis Bernard, and the Indian Affair." Massachusetts Historical Review 11#1 (2009): 27–56. online
- Rossiter, Clinton (October 1950). "The Life and Mind of Jonathan Mayhew". The William and Mary Quarterly. 7 (4): 531–558. JSTOR 1917045.
- Sandoz, Ellis (1991). Political sermons of the American founding era, 1730-1805. Indianapolis: LibertyPress. ISBN 9780865971776.

=== Writings ===
- Jonathan Mayhew (1749). Seven Sermons. Boston: Rogers and Fowle in Queen-Street.
- —— (1750). A Discourse Concerning Unlimited Submission and Non-resistance to the Higher Powers: With Some Reflections on the Resistance Made to King Charles I, and on the Anniversary of His Death. Boston: D. Fowle in Queen-Street; and by D. Gookin over against the South meeting-house.
- —— (1754). A Sermon Preach'd in the Audience of His Excellency William Shirley. Boston printed: London, reprinted for G. Woodfall.
- —— (1759). Two Discourses Delivered October 25th. 1759. Richard Draper, in Newbury-Street; Edes & Gill, in Queen-Street; and Thomas & John Fleet, in Cornhill.
- —— (1763). Christian Sobriety: Being Eight Sermons on Titus II.6. Boston: R. & S. Draper.
- —— (1763). Sermons on the Nature, Extent and Perfection of the Divine Goodness. Boston, N. E.: C & J Kneeland.
- —— (1763). Observations on the Charter and Conduct of the Society for the Propagation of the Gospel in Foreign Parts: Designed to Shew Their Non-conformity to Each Other. Boston, in New-England, printed: London, reprinted for W. Nicoll.
- —— (1764). A Defence of the Observations on the Charter and Conduct of the Society for the Propagation of the Gospel in Foreign Parts: Against an Anonymous Pamphlet Falsly Intitled, A Candid Examination of Dr. Mayhew's Observations. Boston printed: London reprinted for W. Nicoll.
- —— (1766). The Snare Broken; a Thanksgiving Discourse; Preached in Boston, N.E., May 23, 1766: Occasioned by the Repeal of the Stamp-Act. Boston, N. E. ISBN 9780608411958.
