= Royal Harwood Frost =

American astronomer (1879–1950)

Asteroids discovered: 1
505 Cava	21 August 1902

Royal Harwood Frost (25 February 1879 – 11 May 1950) was an American astronomer, born in Salem, Massachusetts to Albinus Finney Frost and Emma Jane Richardson, the fourth son of a family of ten.

He married Caroline Eliza Mayhew with whom he had three daughters (Caroline Frost, Martha Richardson Frost and Barbara Frost) and two sons (Royal Harwood Frost Jr. and William Mayhew Frost).

Frost was an astronomical assistant at the Harvard College Observatory from 1896 to 1908, under the directorship of Edward Charles Pickering. From 1902 to 1905 he worked at the Arequipa station in Peru using the 24-inch f/5.6 Bruce photographic refractor, made by Alvan Clark & Sons and completed in 1893. His observations of nebulae (following DeLisle Stewart) using four-hour plates were published in the Harv. Ann. 60, 179 (1908). He discovered 454 new objects, included in the IC II (Second Index Catalogue of Nebulae Found in the Years 1895 to 1907; with Notes and Corrections to the New General Catalogue and to the Index Catalogue for 1888 to 1894, Mem. Roy. Astron. Soc., Vol. 59, Part 2, p. 105, 1908).After leaving the observatory, Royal started a dairy farm in Tingo, Peru.

He later returned to Ft. Worth, Texas, to work for an oil company doing accounting. Later still he moved to Shreveport, Louisiana. He is buried in the Forest Park Cemetery at Shreveport, Louisiana.
