= Meanings of minor-planet names: 10001–11000 =

As minor planet discoveries are confirmed, they are given a permanent number by the IAU's Minor Planet Center (MPC), and the discoverers can then submit names for them, following the IAU's naming conventions. The list below concerns those minor planets in the specified number-range that have received names, and explains the meanings of those names.

Official naming citations of newly named small Solar System bodies are approved and published in a bulletin by IAU's Working Group for Small Bodies Nomenclature (WGSBN). Before May 2021, citations were published in MPC's Minor Planet Circulars for many decades. Recent citations can also be found on the JPL Small-Body Database (SBDB). Until his death in 2016, German astronomer Lutz D. Schmadel compiled these citations into the Dictionary of Minor Planet Names (DMP) and regularly updated the collection.

Based on Paul Herget's The Names of the Minor Planets, Schmadel also researched the unclear origin of numerous asteroids, most of which had been named prior to World War II. This article incorporates text from this source, which is in the public domain: SBDB New namings may only be added to this list below after official publication as the preannouncement of names is condemned. The WGSBN publishes a comprehensive guideline for the naming rules of non-cometary small Solar System bodies.

== 10001–10100 ==
Named minor planet	Provisional	This minor planet was named for...	Ref · Catalog
10001 Palermo	1969 TM_{1}	The city of Palermo, Italy, where the Palermo Observatory located, at which Giuseppe Piazzi discovered 1 Ceres in 1801 (see naming for 1 Ceres and 1000 Piazzia)	JPL · 10001
10002 Bagdasarian	1969 TQ_{1}	Aleksandr Sergeevich Bagdasaryan (born 1946), a radio and electronics engineer and director of a Moscow-based research corporation	JPL · 10002
10003 Caryhuang	1971 UD_{1}	Cary Huang (born 1997) is an animator and YouTuber known for co-creating the animated web series Battle for Dream Island and The Scale of the Universe along with his twin brother, Michael. He is also known for making edutainment and data visualization videos on his YouTube channel "jacknjellify".	JPL · 10003
10004 Igormakarov	1975 VV_{2}	Igor' Mikhajlovich Makarov (born 1927) is known for his research on nonlinear and adaptive systems, artificial intelligence and the choice and acceptance of decisions. He was chief scientific secretary of the Russian Academy of Sciences during 1988–1996.	JPL · 10004
10005 Chernega	1976 SS_{2}	Nikolaj Akimovich Chernega (born 1923), a specialist in astrometry and the compilation of catalogues of highly precise stellar coordinates.	JPL · 10005
10006 Sessai	1976 UR_{15}	Nishiyama Sessai (1735–1798), a Confucian scholar in the Edo period, born at Kamogata, Okayama prefecture.	JPL · 10006
10007 Malytheatre	1976 YF_{3}	Maly Theatre, Moscow (a.k.a. Ostrovsky's house and "The Second Moscow University"), the oldest Russian theater (founded in 1756)	JPL · 10007
10008 Raisanyo	1977 DT_{2}	Rai San'yō (1780–1832), a Confucian scholar in the Edo period, born at Takehara, Hiroshima prefecture.	JPL · 10008
10009 Hirosetanso	1977 EA_{6}	Hirose Tansō (1782–1856), a Confucian scholar in the Edo period, born at Hita, Oita prefecture.	JPL · 10009
10010 Rudruna	1978 PW_{3}	RUDruNa, or Rossijskij Universitet Druzhby Narodov, is the Russian University of Friendship of Nations.	JPL · 10010
10011 Avidzba	1978 QY_{1}	Anatolij Mkanovich Avidzba (born 1951), an orchardist and viticulturist.	JPL · 10011
10012 Tmutarakania	1978 RE_{3}	Tmutarakania, a Russian principality in the Tamanian peninsula from the tenth to the twelfth centuries.	JPL · 10012
10013 Stenholm	1978 RR_{8}	Björn Stenholm, Swedish astronomer at Lund Observatory has for many years worked on outreach activities in astronomy, notably as editor of the Swedish journal Populär Astronomi (IAU).	JPL · 10013
10014 Shaim	1978 SE_{3}	Shaim, a town in the Tyumen province of the Russian Federation. In its environs the first oil field in western Siberia was discovered in 1959.	JPL · 10014
10015 Valenlebedev	1978 SA_{5}	Valentin Lebedev (born 1942), Russian cosmonaut and author, founder and director of the Scientific Geoinformation Center of the Russian Academy of Sciences	JPL · 10015
10016 Yugan	1978 SW_{7}	Yugan is the shortened name of Nefteyugansk, a town in western Siberia that is the center of the drilling operations of Ust'-Balyk and other oil fields.	JPL · 10016
10017 Jaotsungi	1978 UP_{2}	Jao Tsung-I, (1917-2018), a world-renowned sinologist, painter and calligrapher	JPL · 10017
10018 Lykawka	1979 MG_{4}	Patryk Sofia Lykawka (born 1976) is a Brazilian-Italian planetary scientist and dynamicist whose contributions include modeling Edgeworth-Kuiper Belt formation and the dynamical evolution processes of mean motion resonances.	JPL · 10018
10019 Wesleyfraser	1979 MK_{7}	Wesley C. Fraser (born 1981) is a researcher at Queen's University Belfast whose studies include the size distribution of Kuiper Belt objects to better constrain their formation.	JPL · 10019
10020 Bagenal	1979 OQ_{5}	Frances Bagenal (born 1954), a planetary scientist and professor at the University of Colorado, who has been a science team member for the Voyager, Galileo and New Horizons missions.	JPL · 10020
10021 Henja	1979 QC_{1}	Karin Henja is a prolific constructor of the Swedish form of crossword puzzles.	JPL · 10021
10022 Zubov	1979 SU_{2}	Vladimir Ivanovich Zubov (1930–2000), a Russian mathematician and mechanician.	JPL · 10022
10023 Vladifedorov	1979 WX_{3}	Vladimir Dmitrievich Fedorov (born 1933), an outstanding Russian surgeon, scientist and professor.	JPL · 10023
10024 Marthahazen	1980 EB	Martha L. Hazen (born 1931), American astronomer who maintained Harvard's photographic plate archive and edited the Harvard Announcement Cards precursors of IAU's CBATs	JPL · 10024
10025 Rauer	1980 FO_{1}	Heike Rauer (born 1961), a German planetary astronomer, is known for her observational work on cometary comae, in particular that of comet C/1995 O1 (Hale-Bopp). She is currently working at the Institute of Space Sensor Technology and Planetary Exploration in Berlin on a project to search for extrasolar planetary systems.	JPL · 10025
10026 Sophiexeon	1980 RE_{1}	Sophie Xeon (1986–2021), known as SOPHIE, was a highly influential English singer, songwriter, and producer.	IAU · 10026
10027 Perozzi	1981 FL	Ettore Perozzi (born 1957), works on solar-system dynamics, planetary science and mission analysis. He has been involved in the Cassini/Huygens mission and in proposals for missions to comets and minor planets.	JPL · 10027
10028 Bonus	1981 JM_{2}	Shelley R. Bonus, American astronomer, creator of the "Janet Planet" and "Space E. Tracy" astronomy shows and lectures, assisted in organizing the photographic glass plate archive of the 1.2-m Schmidt Oschin Telescope at Palomar Observatory	JPL · 10028
10029 Hiramperkins	1981 QF	Hiram Perkins (1833–1924), a professor of mathematics and astronomy at the Ohio Wesleyan University from 1857 to 1907.	JPL · 10029
10030 Philkeenan	1981 QG	Philip Keenan (1908–2000), a professor of astronomy with the Ohio State University at Perkins Observatory from 1946 until his death.	JPL · 10030
10031 Vladarnolda	1981 RB_{2}	Vladimir Arnold (born 1937), a Russian mathematician. The name was suggested by V. J. Judovich.	JPL · 10031
10032 Hans-Ulrich	1981 RF_{7}	Hans-Ulrich Auster (born 1959) is Head of the Space Magnetometer Laboratory at Braunschweig Technical University, known for research and development of magnetometers aboard multiple spacecraft, including Rosetta's Philae lander.	JPL · 10032
10033 Bodewits	1981 UJ_{23}	Dennis Bodewits (born 1979) is a research scientist at the University of Maryland who performs observational studies of the activity and evolution of comets and active asteroids using the Swift gamma-ray burst space observatory.	JPL · 10033
10034 Birlan	1981 YG	Mirel Birlan (born 1963), Romanian astronomer at Paris Observatory, began his career in 1991 as an astronomer at the Bucharest Observatory. He has conducted observing campaigns on minor Solar-System bodies and has been involved in groundbased science of Rosetta mission asteroid targets. The name was suggested by M. A. Barucci.	JPL · 10034
10035 Davidgheesling	1982 DC_{2}	David Gheesling (1967–2020), of Roswell, GA (USA), was an astronomy and meteorite enthusiast, author, public speaker, and a member of the Board of Director of the International Meteorite Collectors Association. H	IAU · 10035
10036 McGaha	1982 OF	James E. McGaha (born 1946), a Tucson astronomer, lecturer, U.S. Air Force pilot and skeptic, actively promotes science and the refutation of pseudoscience.	JPL · 10036
10037 Raypickard	1984 BQ	Ray Pickard (born 1967), of Bathurst, NSW (Australia), is a teacher and academic.	IAU · 10037
10038 Tanaro	1984 HO_{1}	Tanaro, longest river of Piedmont, Italy.	JPL · 10038
10039 Keet Seel	1984 LK	Keet Seel, a prehistoric cliff dwelling located in Tsegi Canyon, in what is now the Navajo National Monument in northern Arizona; the name is from a Navajo phrase "kits'iil" or "kin ts'iil" meaning "houses that have been left behind" (1998 Flagstaff Festival of Science asteroid naming contest winner). The name was suggested by M. T. Gibson.	JPL · 10039
10040 Ghillar	1984 QM	Ghillar Michael Anderson (born 1951), of Goodooga, NSW (Australia), is an Aboriginal elder, Senior Law Man, and leader of the Euahlayi people bordering northern New South Wales and southern Queensland.	IAU · 10040
10041 Parkinson	1985 HS_{1}	Bradford Parkinson (born 1935) is an American engineer and inventor who led a team that developed the Global Positioning System with revolutionary tracking technology.	JPL · 10041
10042 Budstewart	1985 PL	L. R. ("Bud") Stewart (1903–1979), a cofounder of the Columbus Astronomical Society in 1947 and its first president.	JPL · 10042
10043 Janegann	1985 PN	Jane Gann (1910–1994), a cofounder and first female president of the Columbus Astronomical Society.	JPL · 10043
10044 Squyres	1985 RU	Steven W. Squyres (born 1956), a professor of astronomy at Cornell University.	JPL · 10044
10045 Dorarussell	1985 RJ_{3}	Dora Oake Russell (1913–1986) was a Canadian writer and educator, who, in 1965, co-founded the St. John's Centre branch of the Royal Astronomical Society of Canada (RASC) in Newfoundland. She was awarded the Queen Elizabeth II Silver Jubilee Medal and the RASC Service Award in 1977, and wrote a weekly column on astronomy in The Evening Telegram.	IAU · 10045
10046 Creighton	1986 JC	James M. Creighton (1856–1946), an American architect who designed "Old Main" at the University of Arizona	JPL · 10046
10047 Davidchapman	1986 QK_{2}	David Chapman (born 1953) is a Canadian amateur astronomer and former underwater acoustician at the Defence Research and Development Canada, who was honored with the Simon Newcomb Award and the Service award of the Royal Astronomical Society of Canada (RASC) in 1986 and 2015, respectively. He was made a Fellow of the RASC IN 2020.	IAU · 10047
10048 Grönbech	1986 TQ	Danish observational astronomer Bent Grönbech (1947–1977) was known for the Grönbech-Olsen catalogues of complete Strömgren photometry of southern bright stars and for his research on eclipsing binaries, comets and minor planets. He published 36 scientific papers	JPL · 10048
10049 Vorovich	1986 TZ_{11}	Izrailevich Vorovich (born 1920), an academician of the Russian Academy of Sciences Iosif.	JPL · 10049
10050 Rayman	1987 MA_{1}	Marc D. Rayman (born 1956) is Chief Engineer for Mission Operations and Science at NASA's Jet Propulsion Laboratory.	JPL · 10050
10051 Albee	1987 QG_{6}	Arden L. Albee (born 1928), a Caltech professor of geology and planetary sciences.	JPL · 10051
10052 Nason	1987 SM_{12}	Jymme Curtis (Curt) Nason (born 1953), co-founder of the Royal Astronomical Society of Canada New Brunswick Centre in 2000	IAU · 10052
10053 Noeldetilly	1987 SR_{12}	Rolland Noël de Tilly (1906–1983), long-time leader of the Royal Astronomical Society of Canada, Centre de Montréal	IAU · 10053
10054 Solomin	1987 SQ_{17}	Yurij Mefodievich Solomin (1935–2024), a Russian actor.	JPL · 10054
10055 Silcher	1987 YC_{1}	German composer Friedrich Silcher (1789–1860)	MPC · 10055
10056 Johnschroer	1988 BX_{3}	John A. Schroer IV (1956–2014) was a planetarium and space science educator for the Michigan Science Center in Detroit. He was also former president of the Great Lakes Planetarium Association and an amateur radio operator.	JPL · 10056
10057 L'Obel	1988 CO_{1}	Matthias de l'Obel (Lobelius, 1538–1616), a Flemish physician and botanist.	JPL · 10057
10058 Ikwilliamson	1988 DD_{5}	Isabel K. Williamson (1908–2000), was a Canadian observer of aurora and meteors, who won the Royal Astronomical Society of Canada's Chant Medal in 1948	IAU · 10058
10059 McCullough	1988 FS_{2}	Brian McCullough (born 1953) former president and vice president of the Ottawa Centre branch of the Royal Astronomical Society of Canada (RASC), and an active science communicator at the Canada Science and Technology Museum in Ottawa.	IAU · 10059
10060 Amymilne	1988 GL	Named for Amy Rae Milne (born 1982), a Canadian environmentalist	JPL · 10060
10061 Ndolaprata	1988 PG_{1}	Ndola de Jesus Veiga Prata (born 1965), Angolan medical doctor and public health expert and lecturer	JPL · 10061
10062 Kimhay	1988 RV_{4}	Kimberley Dawn Hay (born 1959), a North American sketch artist and amateur astronomer, observer of sunspots and meteor showers, and contributor to AMS, AAVSO, ALPO, as well as the RASC.	IAU · 10062
10063 Erinleeryan	1988 SZ_{2}	Erin Lee Ryan (born 1981) is a research scientist with the SETI Institute whose work includes spectral and lightcurve observations of the Hilda asteroids.	JPL · 10063
10064 Hirosetamotsu	1988 UO	Tamotsu Hirose (born 1931) is known as an astronomical leader throughout the four prefectures of the island of Shikoku. He began observing sunspots with a heliostat in 1949, after which he built his own private observatory for the continuous observation of sunspots.	JPL · 10064
10065 Greglisk	1988 XK	Greg Lisk (born 1963) Canadian amateur astronomer and president and organizer at RASC's Belleville Centre. In 2014, he was honored with the RASC Service Award (Src).	IAU · 10065
10066 Pihack	1988 XV_{2}	Brian Pihack (born 1956), a Canadian chiropractor, amateur astronomer and president at RASC's Niagara Centre, where he has been giving astronomy lectures to the public of southern Ontario.	IAU · 10066
10067 Bertuch	1989 AL_{6}	Friedrich Justin Bertuch (1747–1822), a German author and bookseller.	JPL · 10067
10068 Dodoens	1989 CT_{2}	Rembertus Dodonaeus (1516–1585), a Flemish physician and botanist.	JPL · 10068
10069 Fontenelle	1989 CW_{2}	Bernard Le Bovier, sieur de Fontenelle (1657–1757), known for his work Entretiens sur la pluralité des mondes (1686).	JPL · 10069
10070 Liuzongli	1989 CB_{8}	Liu Zongli (born 1937), a professor of astronomy and astronomer at Beijing National Observatory.	JPL · 10070
10071 Paraguay	1989 EZ_{2}	Paraguay, a South American country bordered by Bolivia, Brazil and Argentina.	JPL · 10071
10072 Uruguay	1989 GF_{1}	Uruguay, a country in the south eastern region of South America, bordered on the east by the Atlantic Ocean.	JPL · 10072
10073 Peterhiscocks	1989 GJ_{2}	Peter Hiscocks (1945–2018) was a Canadian amateur astronomer and electrical engineer at Ryerson University, Toronto, and an expert in light pollution abatement at RASC's Toronto Centre.	IAU · 10073
10074 Van den Berghe	1989 GH_{4}	Frits Van den Berghe (1883–1939), a Belgian painter	JPL · 10074
10075 Campeche	1989 GR_{4}	The Bay of Campeche is surrounded by the Mexican states of Campeche, Tabasco and Veracrux.	JPL · 10075
10076 Rogerhill	1989 PK	Roger Hill (born 1955), 6 time past president, newsletter editor for 12 years and member of the RASC's Hamilton Centre for over 50 years.	IAU · 10076
10077 Raykoenig	1989 UL_{1}	Raymond Koenig (1930–2007) was a Canadian physicist and astronomer, and a founding member of the RASC's Kitchener-Waterloo Centre.	IAU · 10077
10078 Stanthorpe	1989 UJ_{3}	Stanthorpe, Queensland's wine capital, Australia	JPL · 10078
10079 Meunier	1989 XD_{2}	Constantin Meunier (1831–1905), a Belgian sculptor and painter.	JPL · 10079
10080 Macevans	1990 OF_{1}	William MacDonald Evans (born 1942), a Canadian electrical engineer and former president of the Canadian Space Agency (1994–2001), recipient of NASA's Distinguished Public Service Medal, and a Member of the Order of Canada. He was born in Sarnia, Canada, completed his undergraduate studies at Queen's University, and received his Master of Science from the University of Birmingham.	IAU · 10080
10081 Dantaylor	1990 OW_{1}	Daniel Taylor (born 1958) a Canadian amateur astronomer from Ontario, and former president of RASC's Windsor Centre, who is active in the abatement of light pollution on a national level.	IAU · 10081
10082 Bronson	1990 OF_{2}	Ted Arthur Bronson (born 1952), a Canadian amateur astronomer and former president of RASC's Thunder Bay Centre. In 2006, he received a RASC Service Award.	IAU · 10082
10083 Gordonanderson	1990 QE_{2}	Gordon "Jay" Anderson (born 1947), a former meteorologist, eclipsophile, and author, who served as Editor of the Journal of the Royal Astronomical Society of Canada for 10 years.	IAU · 10083
10084 Rossparker	1990 QC_{5}	Ross Parker (born 1959), a Canadian amateur astronomer and historian, who is a member of RASC's Regina Centre.	IAU · 10084
10085 Jekennedy	1990 QF_{5}	John Edward Kennedy (1916–1999), a Canadian physicist who was a charter member of the Canadian Astronomical Society (CASCA).	IAU · 10085
10086 McCurdy	1990 SZ	Bruce Jefferson McCurdy (born 1955) a Canadian amateur astronomer in Edmonton, who was honored with the 2007 Service Award of the Royal Astronomical Society of Canada (RASC) for his contributions to community outreach and his publications.	IAU · 10086
10087 Dechesne	1990 SG_{3}	Roland George Dechesne (born 1960), a Canadian amateur astronomer, former president of the Ottawa Centre branch of the Royal Astronomical Society of Canada (RASC), organizer of the "Barbecue Under the Stars" event in Calgary, and a leading member of RASC's Light Pollution Abatement Committee, who was honored with the Fellowship of the Royal Astronomical Society of Canada in 2021 for his lifetime of service to the Society.	IAU · 10087
10088 Digne	1990 SG_{8}	Digne, a town in southern France	JPL · 10088
10089 Turgot	1990 SS_{9}	Anne Robert Jacques Turgot (1727–1781), a French economist.	JPL · 10089
10090 Sikorsky	1990 TK_{15}	Igor Sikorsky (1889–1972), an aircraft designer.	JPL · 10090
10091 Bandaisan	1990 VD_{3}	Mount Bandai, Japanese active volcano in Fukushima prefecture	JPL · 10091
10092 Sasaki	1990 VD_{4}	Katsuhiro Sasaki (born 1941), the director of the Department of Science and Engineering, National Science Museum, Tokyo.	JPL · 10092
10093 Diesel	1990 WX_{1}	Rudolf Diesel (1858–1913), a German thermal engineer and inventor of the diesel engine.	JPL · 10093
10094 Eijikato	1991 DK	Eiji Kato (born 1942)	JPL · 10094
10095 Carlloewe	1991 RP_{2}	Carl Loewe (1796–1869), a German composer was an organist and director of the Pomeranian music festivals in Stettin.	MPC · 10095
10096 Colleenohare	1991 RK_{5}	Colleen O'Hare (born 1955), member of the Okanagan Centre branch of the Royal Astronomical Society of Canada (RASC), who won the 2012 Qilak Award and the RASC Service Award in 2018.	IAU · 10096
10097 Humbroncos	1991 RV_{16}	In memory of the sixteen people killed in the Humboldt Broncos bus crash near Armley, Saskatchewan, Canada, in 2018.	IAU · 10097
10098 Jaymiematthews	1991 SC_{1}	Jaymie Matthews (born 1958), a Canadian astrophysicist, asteroseismologist, and a principal investigator for the MOST spacecraft. He is a member of the University of British Columbia and was made an Officer of the Order of Canada.	IAU · 10098
10099 Glazebrook	1991 VB_{9}	Karl Glazebrook (born 1965), an astronomer at Johns Hopkins University.	JPL · 10099
10100 Bürgel	1991 XH_{1}	Bruno H. Bürgel (1875–1948), a German shoemaker and astronomical writer	JPL · 10100

== 10101–10200 ==
back to top

Named minor planet	Provisional	This minor planet was named for...	Ref · Catalog
10101 Fourier	1992 BM_{2}	Joseph Fourier (1768–1830), a French mathematician who exerted a strong influence on mathematical physics through his Théorie analytique de la chaleur (1822), wherein he showed that the conduction of heat in solid bodies may be analyzed in terms of infinite mathematical series, the so-called "Fourier series". In 1798 he accompanied Napoleon to Egypt, where he was engaged, until 1801, in extensive research on Egyptian antiquities.	JPL · 10101
10102 Digerhuvud	1992 DA_{6}	Digerhuvud, a place on the island of Gotland, Sweden, where seastacks are most common.	JPL · 10102
10103 Jungfrun	1992 DB_{9}	Jungfrun, largest stack on Gotland island, Sweden	JPL · 10103
10104 Hoburgsgubben	1992 EY_{9}	Hoburgsgubben is a seastack on southern Gotland, Sweden, looking like an old man watching the sea.	JPL · 10104
10105 Holmhällar	1992 EM_{12}	Holmhällar a place on the island of Gotland, Sweden, contains an unusual area of seastacks. One of the expeditions from the Uppsala Observatory to the total solar eclipse on 1954 June 30 was based there.	JPL · 10105
10106 Lergrav	1992 EV_{15}	Lergrav, a settlement with stacks on the island of Gotland, Sweden.	JPL · 10106
10107 Kenny	1992 FW_{1}	Kenneth Robert Steel (1929–), the father of British discoverer Duncan Steel	JPL · 10107
10108 Tomlinson	1992 HM	Ray Tomlinson (1941–2016) an American computer programmer who implemented the first email program on the ARPANET system, the precursor to the Internet, in 1971	JPL · 10108
10109 Sidhu	1992 KQ	Jaskarn Singh "Sid" Sidhu (born 1938), member of the Victoria Centre branch of the Royal Astronomical Society of Canada (RASC), who received the RASC President's Award in 2010.	IAU · 10109
10110 Jameshead	1992 LJ	James W. Head (born 1941) is an American geologist who has been involved in geological and surface exploration of solar-system bodies since the Apollo era. He participated in the selection of Apollo landing sites, trained astronaut crews in geology and surface exploration, planned experiments deployed on the Moon, and analyzed returned lunar samples.	IAU · 10110
10111 Fresnel	1992 OO_{1}	Augustin-Jean Fresnel (1788–1827), French physicist who constructed the so-called "Fresnel lens".	JPL · 10111
10112 Skookumjim	1992 OP_{1}	Keish (c. 1855–1916), known as Skookum Jim Mason, was a Tagish adventurer and prospector in Canada's Yukon Territory who shared the Discovery Claim that initiated the Klondike Gold Rush. A trust fund he established helped provide medical care for aboriginals in the Yukon, and his house in Carcross is an interpretative centre today for Yukon culture.	IAU · 10112
10113 Alantitle	1992 PX_{2}	Alan M. Title (born 1938) is an American physicist who participated in the Apollo Telescope Mount investigation on Skylab 2 in 1973. He developed solar telescopes and has served the COSPAR solar-physics and Earth-science communities, contributing to the Space Weather and the Small Satellite COSPAR roadmaps.	IAU · 10113
10114 Greifswald	1992 RZ	Greifswald	JPL · 10114
10116 Robertfranz	1992 SJ_{2}	Robert Franz (1815–1892), a German composer	MPC · 10116
10117 Tanikawa	1992 TW	Kiyotaka Tanikawa (born 1944) is an associate professor at the National Astronomical Observatory of Japan who specializes in the study of the three-body problem	JPL · 10117
10118 Jiwu	1992 UK_{1}	Ji Wu (born 1958) is a Chinese physicist who has promoted collaboration between China, Europe, Russia and the United States. He was a key player in developing Double Star, the first Chinese space-science mission, and he coordinates collaboration between the Double Star program and the ESA Cluster mission.	IAU · 10118
10119 Remarque	1992 YC_{1}	Erich Maria Remarque (1898–1970) German novelist, chiefly known for his Im Westen nichts Neues ("All Quiet on the Western Front", 1929).	JPL · 10119
10120 Ypres	1992 YH_{2}	The Belgian city of Ypres, with Bruges and Ghent, controlled Flanders in the 13th century. Within the bulge of the British lines during World War I, Ypres was completely destroyed, subsequently to be rebuilt in its original style.	JPL · 10120
10121 Arzamas	1993 BS_{4}	Arzamas, Russia, on the Tesha River	JPL · 10121
10122 Fröding	1993 BC_{5}	Gustav Fröding, 19th-century Swedish poet and journalist, several of whose poems were set to music by Sibelius	JPL · 10122
10123 Fideöja	1993 FJ_{16}	Fide and Öja, two small towns on the Swedish island of Gotland. The church in Öja hosts a crucifix from the thirteenth century.	JPL · 10123
10124 Hemse	1993 FE_{23}	Hemse, the second largest town on the Swedish island of Gotland, is the central node of the southern region.	JPL · 10124
10125 Stenkyrka	1993 FB_{24}	Stenkyrka, a coastal parish on Gotland, Sweden. It hosts one of the largest church towers on the island. In the church can be found the oldest dated gravestone on the island, from the year 1200.	JPL · 10125
10126 Lärbro	1993 FW_{24}	Lärbro, a village on the island of Gotland, Sweden.	JPL · 10126
10127 Fröjel	1993 FF_{26}	Fröjel, a small parish on the island of Gotland, Sweden.	JPL · 10127
10128 Bro	1993 FT_{31}	Bro, is a small parish on the island of Gotland, Sweden, where an old cairn from the Bronze Age is found, said to be the burial site of Baldur.	JPL · 10128
10129 Fole	1993 FO_{40}	Fole, is a small parish on the island of Gotland, Sweden.	JPL · 10129
10130 Ardre	1993 FJ_{50}	Ardre is a small parish on the eastern side of the island of Gotland, Sweden.	JPL · 10130
10131 Stånga	1993 FP_{73}	Stånga, a place on the island of Gotland, Sweden, where annual summer games have been held since 1924	JPL · 10131
10132 Lummelunda	1993 FL_{84}	Lummelunda, a place north of Visby, on the island of Gotland, Sweden.	JPL · 10132
10133 Gerdahorneck	1993 GC_{1}	Gerda Horneck (born 1939) is a German astrobiologist who has pioneered space-biology experiments since the beginning of the space age. She has investigated the effects of space-environment exposure on a broad range of samples of living biota. Horneck was PI for astrobiology experiments from Spacelab 1 to the ISS.	IAU · 10133
10134 Joycepenner	1993 HL_{6}	Joyce E. Penner (born 1948) is an American atmospheric physicist and a leader in identifying the diversity of atmospheric aerosols associated with human activities, and how these aerosols drive climate change.	IAU · 10134
10135 Wimhermsen	1993 LZ_{1}	Wim Hermsen (born 1947) is a Dutch physicist who has served COSPAR since 1988. He has become involved in almost all aspects of COSPAR’s activities, including the Publications Committee, the Finance Committee and Scientific Commission E. Hermsen initiated and has supported Capacity Building workshops.	IAU · 10135
10136 Gauguin	1993 OM_{3}	Paul Gauguin (1848–1903)	JPL · 10136
10137 Thucydides	1993 PV_{6}	Thucydides (ca. 460-400 BC)	JPL · 10137
10138 Ohtanihiroshi	1993 SS_{1}	Hiroshi Ohtani (born 1939) is a professor in the department of astronomy at Kyoto University. His research themes include observational and theoretical studies of interstellar matter and observational study of active galaxies, especially of Seyfert and related galaxies.	JPL · 10138
10139 Ronsard	1993 ST_{4}	Pierre de Ronsard (1524–1585)	JPL · 10139
10140 Villon	1993 SX_{4}	François Villon (1431–1463)	JPL · 10140
10141 Gotenba	1993 VE	Gotenba is a city at the foot of Mt. Fuji. Every year it is the site of a star party that promotes astronomical activities in cooperation with amateur astronomers to spread astronomy to the public	JPL · 10141
10142 Sakka	1993 VG_{1}	Kazuyuki Sakka (born 1943), the director of the Kyoto School of Computer Science, studied spectroscopic properties of galaxies and emission nebulae. He has also created software for astronomy education and popularization	JPL · 10142
10143 Kamogawa	1994 AP_{1}	Kamogawa, a famous river in Japan, flows through the center of Kyoto city. Kamogawa has often appeared in Japanese literature and art	JPL · 10143
10144 Bernardbigot	1994 AB_{2}	Bernard Bigot (1950–2022), a French chemist.	IAU · 10144
10146 Mukaitadashi	1994 CV_{1}	Tadashi Mukai (born 1945), a professor in the department of earth and planetary sciences at Kobe University, is known for studies of near-earth objects	JPL · 10146
10147 Mizugatsuka	1994 CK_{2}	Mizugatsuka is a Japanese park in the middle of the southern trail of Mount Fuji. The clear air makes it a mecca for amateur astronomers.	JPL · 10147
10148 Shirase	1994 GR_{9}	The adventurer Nobu Shirase (1861–1946) was the first Japanese person to explore Antarctica, reaching latitude -80\rm o05' on 1912 Jan. 28	JPL · 10148
10149 Cavagna	1994 PA	Marco Cavagna (born 1958), an Italian amateur astronomer. He began observing comets, variable stars and occultations at an early age. In 1989 he was one of the promoters of the follow-up program, with special interest in NEOs, at Sormano Observatory. Cavagna introduced the discoverers to the Italian astrometric community during its first meeting, held in Verona in 1991.	JPL · 10149
10151 Rubens	1994 PF_{22}	Peter Paul Rubens (1577–1640)	JPL · 10151
10152 Ukichiro	1994 RJ_{11}	Ukichiro Nakaya (1900–1962), professor of physics at Hokkaido University, studied the crystalline structure of snow and in 1935 succeeded in making artificial snow for the first time	JPL · 10152
10153 Goldman	1994 UB	Stuart J. Goldman (born 1963), associate editor of Sky & Telescope	JPL · 10153
10154 Tanuki	1994 UH	Lake Tanuki is an artificial pond to the east of Mt. Fuji. Amateur astronomers gather at its shores for observation	JPL · 10154
10155 Numaguti	1994 VZ_{2}	Atusi Numaguti (1963–2001), an associate professor at Hokkaido University, was actively involved in research on the earth's hydrological cycle. The Atmospheric General Circulation Model he established is now used as a standard in Asia. He founded a summer school for young meteorologists	JPL · 10155
10156 Darnley	1994 VQ_{7}	Matthew Darnley (b. 1978), an English astrophysicist.	IAU · 10156
10157 Asagiri	1994 WE_{1}	Asagiri Highlands are located at the west side of Mt. Fuji in Shizuoka prefecture.	JPL · 10157
10158 Taroubou	1994 XK	Tarobou Highland is located at the west side of Mt. Fuji, in Gotenba City, Shizuoka prefecture.	JPL · 10158
10159 Tokara	1994 XS_{4}	The Tokara Islands form an archipelago in southern Japan. It includes seven inhabited and five uninhabited islands	JPL · 10159
10160 Totoro	1994 YQ_{1}	Hayao Miyazaki produced the animated movie My Neighbor Totoro in 1988	JPL · 10160
10161 Nakanoshima	1994 YZ_{1}	Nakanoshima, largest island in the Tokara Islands, Japan, containing Mount Ontake (Tokara Fuji)	JPL · 10161
10162 Issunboushi	1995 AL	The extraordinarily small character Issunboushi---Issun means about 3 cm in old Japanese---was the hero of many old Japanese tales. Born the size of a bean, he defeated ogres, succeeded in a stratagem that got him a beautiful bride, and shook a mallet that instantly transformed him into a normal young man	JPL · 10162
10163 Onomichi	1995 BH_{1}	The Japanese city of Onomichi near Hiroshima	MPC · 10163
10164 Akusekijima	1995 BS_{1}	Akusekijima, an island in the Tokara Islands, Japan, known for its hot spring. The dense subtropical forest is believed to be the home of the gods that guard the mountainous island, and many shrines have been built to worship the gods.	JPL · 10164
10166 Takarajima	1995 BN_{3}	Takarajima, southernmost inhabited island of the Tokara Islands, Japan, famous as the model of Robert Louis Stevenson's Treasure Island.	JPL · 10166
10167 Yoshiwatiso	1995 BQ_{15}	Yoshikazu Watanabe (born 1953; Iso was his mother's maiden name) was a leading meteor observer in Japan. He is a council member of the Oriental Astronomical Association and a successful surveyor of historical records of comets and meteors in the modern Japanese era. The name was suggested by the discoverer and I. Hasegawa.	JPL · 10167
10168 Stony Ridge	1995 CN	The founders of the Stony Ridge Observatory, the amateur astronomers Anthony L. Bland, Norman L. Boltz, Charles Buzzetti, George A. Carroll, Roy R. Cook, Alvin E. Cram, Roy K. Ensign, W. H. Griffith, Harold J. Ireland, J. George Moyen, Norris A. Roberts, Easy Sloman, John Sousa, John Terlep and Dave Thomas. The observatory is located near Los Angeles in the United States. Starting in 1964, the observatory was used by the Aeronautical Chart and Information Center in St. Louis to map potential landing sites for the Apollo space program.	JPL · 10168
10169 Ogasawara	1995 DK	Located in the Pacific Ocean 1000 km south of Tokyo, the Ogasawara Islands (Bonin Islands), with their extraordinary natural environment, are dubbed the "Galapagos of the Orient". On the Titi-jima Island is the National Astronomical Observatory's Ogasawara Station of VERA (VLBI Exploration of Radio Astrometry)	JPL · 10169
10170 Petrjakeš	1995 DA_{1}	Petr Jakeš, Czech geologist and geochemist †	MPC · 10170
10171 Takaotengu	1995 EE_{8}	Takaotengu, legendary supernatural creature of Mount Takao, Japan.	JPL · 10171
10172 Humphreys	1995 FW_{19}	Minnesota astronomer Roberta M. Humphreys (born 1944) is a leader in studies of physical properties of massive stars in the Milky Way and in nearby galaxies. She headed the Automated Plate Scanner Project to digitize the Palomar Sky Survey and make a publicly available database of a billion stars and several million galaxies	JPL · 10172
10173 Hanzelkazikmund	1995 HA	Miroslav Zikmund (born 1920) and Jiří Hanzelka (born 1919).	JPL · 10173
10174 Emička	1995 JD	Ema Moravcová (born 1999), is the daughter of the discoverer, Zdeněk Moravec.	MPC · 10174
10175 Aenona	1996 CR_{1}	Aenona, now the Croatian city of Nin is the Roman name of the first capital of the old Croatian kingdom. It is located on the east coast of the Adriatic Sea. The world's smallest cathedral, used as an observatory for establishing the local calendar, is located there.	JPL · 10175
10176 Gaiavettori	1996 CW_{7}	Gaia Vettori (born 1999) is the daughter of Vincenzo Vettori, an amateur astronomer in the Montelupo Group	JPL · 10176
10177 Ellison	1996 CK_{9}	Harlan Ellison (1934–2018) was an American science-fiction author.	JPL · 10177
10178 Iriki	1996 DD	Iriki, a historical town in the Satsuma area, Kagoshima prefecture, Japan (now merged into Satsumasendai, Kagoshima) Here on the Mt. Yaeyama highland are the National Astronomical Observatory's Iriki Station of VERA (VLBI Exploration of Radio Astrometry), as well as the Kagoshima University's 1-m optical-infrared telescope.	JPL · 10178
10179 Ishigaki	1996 DE	The picturesque Ishigakijima is the largest of the Yaeyama Islands, Okinawa prefecture. Installed in this island is the National Astronomical Observatory's Ishigaki Station of VERA (VLBI Exploration of Radio Astrometry)	JPL · 10179
10181 Davidacomba	1996 FP_{3}	Davida H. Comba (born 1928), wife of American amateur astronomer Paul G. Comba, who discovered this minor planet.	JPL · 10181
10182 Junkobiwaki	1996 FL_{5}	Junko Biwaki (born 1914) was a teacher of elementary and junior high-school in Yamaguchi prefecture for 43 years beginning in 1933.	JPL · 10182
10183 Ampère	1996 GV_{20}	André-Marie Ampère (1775–1836), French physicist who founded the science of electromagnetism. In 1820 he formulated a law that mathematically describes the phenomenon of deflection of a magnetic needle near a current-carrying wire. A full account of his theories has been given in his Mémoire sur la théorie mathématique des phénomènes électrodynamique (1827).	JPL · 10183
10184 Galvani	1996 HC_{19}	Luigi Galvani (1737–1798), Italian physician and physicist who conceived the electrical nature of nerve impulses. His discoveries led to the invention of the voltaic pile. His findings have been published in De viribus electricitatis in motu musculari commentarius (1791).	JPL · 10184
10185 Gaudi	1996 HD_{21}	Antoni Gaudí (1852–1926), a Spanish architect	JPL · 10185
10186 Albéniz	1996 HD_{24}	Spanish composer and pianist Isaac Albéniz (1860–1909)	JPL · 10186
10188 Yasuoyoneda	1996 JY	Yasuo Yoneda (born 1942), the first director of "Tenkyukan", the Dynic Astronomical Observatory, is an amateur astronomer who observes sunspots. He contributes to the spread of astronomy and to the support of amateur astronomers.	JPL · 10188
10189 Normanrockwell	1996 JK_{16}	Norman Rockwell (1894–1978)	JPL · 10189
10190 Suzannedodd	1996 NC	Suzanne "Suzy" Dodd (born 1961), director of the Interplanetary Network Directorate at the Jet Propulsion Laboratory.	JPL · 10190
10191 Scottbolton	1996 NU_{1}	Scott J. Bolton (born 1958), American space physicist and an associate vice president of the Southwest Research Institute's Space Science and Engineering Division.	JPL · 10191
10192 Wanglizhe	1996 OQ_{1}	Wang Lizhe, Chinese scientist and professor at Tsinghua University.	IAU · 10192
10193 Nishimoto	1996 PR_{1}	Physicist Daron L. Nishimoto (born 1966) has worked at AMOS since 1988.	JPL · 10193
10194 Tonygeorge	1996 QN_{1}	Tony George (b. 1947), an American contributor to occultation astronomy	IAU · 10194
10195 Nebraska	1996 RS_{5}	The U.S. state of Nebraska. This minor planet has been the first one to be discovered in this state.	MPC · 10195
10196 Akiraarai	1996 TJ_{15}	Akira Arai (b. 1981), a Japanese astronomer.	IAU · 10196
10197 Senigalliesi	1996 UO	Italian amateur astronomer Paolo Senigalliesi (1936–1986)	JPL · 10197
10198 Pinelli	1996 XN_{26}	Paolo Pinelli (born 1954) is an amateur astronomer of the Montelupo group. He was the first to propose the construction of a public observatory in the city of Montelupo	JPL · 10198
10199 Chariklo	1997 CU_{26}	Chariclo (Chariklo), from Greek mythology, a female centaur and the wife of Chiron, sometimes described as a sea nymph. Together they are said to have had as many as five children, and she is also sometimes said to have been the mother of Tiresias, the famous seer.	JPL · 10199
10200 Quadri	1997 NZ_{2}	Ulisse Quadri (born 1953), an Italian teacher, amateur astronomer, discoverer of minor planets and author of articles and texts on science and mathematics for children.	JPL · 10200

== 10201–10300 ==
back to top

Named minor planet	Provisional	This minor planet was named for...	Ref · Catalog
10201 Korado	1997 NL_{6}	Korado Korlević (born 1958), a Croatian astronomer	JPL · 10201
10202 Mioaramandea	1997 PE	Mioara Mandea (born 1958), Romanian-French geophysicist and head of the Science Coordination department at the Centre national d'études spatiales.	JPL · 10202
10203 Flinders	1997 PQ	Matthew Flinders (1774–1814), British navigator and explorer, or his grandson the archaeologist and Egyptologist Flinders Petrie	MPC · 10203
10204 Turing	1997 PK_{1}	Alan Turing (1912–1954), British mathematician, logician, cryptographer, and computer scientist	MPC · 10204
10205 Pokorný	1997 PX_{1}	Zdeněk Pokorný (born 1947), a Czech astronomer	MPC · 10205
10207 Comeniana	1997 QA	Bratislava's Comenius University (Universitas Comeniana in Latin)	JPL · 10207
10208 Germanicus	1997 QN_{1}	Germanicus (15 B.C.–19 A.D.)	JPL · 10208
10209 Izanaki	1997 QY_{1}	Izanagi, from Japanese mythology, is the god who descended to the island Onogoro with the goddess Izanami and created the land there, including the island of Awaji.	JPL · 10209
10210 Nathues	1997 QV_{3}	Andreas Nathues (born 1967), a German geophysicist who studied the physical properties of the Eunomia family of minor planets at the German Aerospace Center (DLR), Berlin	JPL · 10210
10211 La Spezia	1997 RG_{3}	La Spezia is an Italian town near the Monte Viseggi Observatory.	JPL · 10211
10213 Koukolík	1997 RK_{7}	František Koukolík (born 1941), Czech neuropathologist and popularizer of science	MPC · 10213
10215 Lavilledemirmont	1997 SQ	Jean de la Ville de Mirmont (1864–1914) a French writer	JPL · 10215
10216 Popastro	1997 SN_{3}	Society for Popular Astronomy (SPA), a national astronomical society based in the United Kingdom, celebrates its fiftieth anniversary in 2003. It was established as the Junior Astronomical Society to promote astronomy as a hobby, particularly among beginners. The SPA is one of three national societies for astronomy in the U.K	JPL · 10216
10217 Richardcook	1997 SN_{4}	Richard Cook (born 1965) was the Mars Pathfinder Flight Operations Manager and was responsible for running the day-to-day operations of the Mars Pathfinder spacecraft during launch, the landing phase and surface operations on Mars	JPL · 10217
10218 Bierstadt	1997 SJ_{23}	Albert Bierstadt (1830–1902)	JPL · 10218
10219 Penco	1997 UJ_{5}	Umberto Penco, an Italian physicist at the University of Pisa.	JPL · 10219
10220 Pigott	1997 UG_{7}	Edward Pigott (1753–1825), an English astronomer and discoverer of variable stars and comets	MPC · 10220
10221 Kubrick	1997 UM_{9}	Stanley Kubrick (1928–1999), American film director	MPC · 10221
10222 Klotz	1997 UV_{10}	Alain Klotz (born 1947), a French amateur astronomer at the Centres d´Etudes Spatiales du Rayonnement in Toulouse. He is currently president of AUDE, the French electronic detectors users association.	JPL · 10222
10223 Zashikiwarashi	1997 UD_{11}	Taking the form of a child with bobbed hair, Zashikiwarashi is a traditional spirit of the people of the Tohoku district. It haunts the Japanese-style rooms of old families. It is said that a family would be wealthy while the spirit lives and become poor when it leaves	JPL · 10223
10224 Hisashi	1997 UK_{22}	Hisashi Hirabayashi (born 1943), Japanese senior chief officer of JAXA Space Education and director of the Space Education Center, who led the Very Long Baseline Interferometer and Space Observatory Program with the radio satellite HALCA that successfully revealed active galactic nuclei.	JPL · 10224
10226 Seishika	1997 VK_{5}	Seishika is a thin purple flower specified as an endangered plant. It lives only in the Yaeyama Islands area, Okinawa prefecture. The flower blooms around April on Mt. Banna-take near the VERA Ishigakijima Station	JPL · 10226
10227 Izanami	1997 VO_{6}	Izanami-no-mikoto is the mythical goddess who descended to the island Onogoro with the god Izanaki and various other gods. After her death she was also called Yomotsu-ookami in the land of the dead	JPL · 10227
10230 Andrewnorton	1997 WU_{35}	Andrew Norton, English astrophysicist at the Open University where he led major teaching and outreach initiatives, and carried out research into the time-domain astrophysics of compact binary stars.	IAU · 10230
10231 Penrose	1997 WQ_{37}	Roger Penrose, English mathematician, mathematical physicist, and philosopher of science.	IAU · 10231
10233 Le Creusot	1997 XQ_{2}	The French town of Le Creusot, location of the Le Creusot Observatory (504) and home of the discoverer Jean-Claude Merlin	MPC · 10233
10234 Sixtygarden	1997 YB_{8}	60 Garden Street is the street address of the Harvard-Smithsonian Center for Astrophysics.	JPL · 10234
10236 Aayushkaran	1998 QA_{93}	Aayush Karan (b. 2001) was a finalist in the 2019 Regeneron Science Talent Search (STS), a science competition for high school seniors, for his mathematics project. He attended the University School of Milwaukee, Milwaukee, Wisconsin.	IAU · 10236
10237 Adzic	1998 SJ_{119}	Vladislav Adzic (born 1984), 2002 Intel ISEF finalist. He attended the Ward Melville High School, East Setauket, New York, U.S.A	JPL · 10237
10238 Ananyakarthik	1998 SO_{140}	Ananya Karthik (b. 2001) was a finalist in the 2019 Regeneron Science Talent Search (STS), a science competition for high school seniors, for her materials science project. She attended the Saint Francis High School, Mountain View, California.	IAU · 10238
10239 Hermann	1998 TY_{30}	Shawn M. Hermann (born 1975), now at Raytheon Corporation, Tucson, was one of the first observers for LONEOS. During 1998–1999 he discovered two Apollos, an Amor and a comet, 275P/Hermann.	JPL · 10239
10241 Miličević	1999 AU_{6}	Nikola Miličević (1887–1963), Croatian astronomer and last administrator of Blaca hermitage (or Pustinja Blaca – Blaca monastery) on Brač, Croatia	JPL · 10241
10242 Wasserkuppe	2808 P-L	Wasserkuppe, high plateau, the highest peak in the Rhön Mountains, in the German state of Hesse. At 950 m, is the highest peak in the Rhön. The area is used for glider training.	JPL · 10242
10243 Hohe Meissner	3553 P-L	Hohe Meissner, (750 m) is a volcano north of the Rhön between the Werra and Fulda rivers, southeast of the city of Kassel, Germany. The basalt quarry is still used. The two rivers Werra and Fulda flow together near the city of Münden and form the Weser river.	JPL · 10243
10244 Thüringer Wald	4668 P-L	Thuringian Forest, a German mountain range east of the Werra river, flowing from northwest to southeast. The summits are the Inselsberg (900 m) and the Beerberg (980 m).	JPL · 10244
10245 Inselsberg	6071 P-L	Großer Inselsberg at 900 m, is one of the peaks of the Thuringian Forest mountain range, Germany.	JPL · 10245
10246 Frankenwald	6381 P-L	The Franconian Forest, Germany, forms the continuation of the Thüringer Wald mountains to the southeast up to the Fichtel Mountains.	JPL · 10246
10247 Amphiaraos	6629 P-L	Amphiaraus (Amphiaraos), from Greek mythology. The Greek seer took part in the campaign of the Argonauts and the "Seven against Thebes".	JPL · 10247
10248 Fichtelgebirge	7639 P-L	Fichtel Mountains, a compact German mountain range east of the city of Bayreuth. The highest mountain is the Schneeberg (1050 m). It is a popular skiing area.	JPL · 10248
10249 Harz	9515 P-L	The Harz, is the northernmost and highest medium-high compact mountain range of Germany. The silver mines were used until the twentieth century, and other ores have been found here.	JPL · 10249
10250 Hellahaasse	1252 T-1	Hella S. Haasse, Dutch novelist	JPL · 10250
10251 Mulisch	3089 T-1	Harry Mulisch, Dutch writer	JPL · 10251
10252 Heidigraf	4164 T-1	Heidi Graf (born 1941), former Head of ESTEC Communications Office (1977–2006) at ESA; "founding mother" of permanent exhibition Space Expo in Noordwijk, Netherlands (since 1990)	MPC · 10252
10253 Westerwald	2116 T-2	Westerwald, in Germany. It is a low mountain range with some volcanoes, blending into the "Siebengebirge", a range of seven extinct volcanic mountains.	JPL · 10253
10254 Hunsrück	2314 T-2	The Hunsrück is a German mountain range, located west of the Rhine between the rivers Nahe and Mosel. In the southern part many semiprecious stones are found, helping create a jewelry industry.	JPL · 10254
10255 Taunus	3398 T-3	The Taunus, a German mountain range, is the continuation of the Hundsrück at the eastern side of the Rhine. Its highest mountain, at 880 m, is called "Feldberg in the Taunus". As in the Schwarzwald, there are many thermal springs.	JPL · 10255
10256 Vredevoogd	4157 T-3	Loek Vredevoogd, chairman of the Board of Governors of Leiden University during 1994–2002.	MPC · 10256
10257 Garecynthia	4333 T-3	The marriage of Gareth Williams, associate director of the Minor Planet Center, and Cynthia Marsden, daughter of the director, Brian G. Marsden, in Lexington, Massachusetts, on 1 October 2002.	JPL · 10257
10258 Sárneczky	1940 AB	Krisztián Sárneczky (born 1974) is a Hungarian asteroid and comet researcher at Konkoly Observatory, who discovered 363 numbered asteroids and five supernovae. He is the leader of the Comet Section of the Hungarian Astronomical Association.	JPL · 10258
10259 Osipovyurij	1972 HL	Yury Osipov (born 1936) is a Russian mathematician and mechanician. Since 1991 he has been president of the Russian Academy of Sciences	JPL · 10259
10260 Stellaseitz	1972 TC	Stella Seitz, German astronomer.	IAU · 10260
10261 Nikdollezhalʹ	1974 QF_{1}	Nikolay Dollezhal (1899–2000), Russian expert in power engineering, was the chief designer of the reactor for the world's first atomic power station, located in Obninsk, some 120 km southwest of Moscow	JPL · 10261
10262 Samoilov	1975 TQ_{3}	Evgenij Valerianovich Samoilov (born 1912) is a Russian dramatic actor and People's Artist of the former U.S.S.R. He performs at the State Academic Maly Theatre in Moscow	JPL · 10262
10263 Vadimsimona	1976 SE_{5}	Russian physicist Vadim Aleksandrovich Simonenko is deputy director of the Russian Scientific Research Institute of Technical Physics at Snezhinsk. He is known for his work on the hazards of near-earth objects and the protection of the earth	JPL · 10263
10264 Marov	1978 PH_{3}	Mikhail Yakovlevich Marov (born 1933), professor and head of the planetary department at Keldysh Institute of Applied Mathematics. He is also currently the president of IAU Division III.	JPL · 10264
10265 Gunnarsson	1978 RY_{6}	Marcus Gunnarsson (born 1971), a planetary scientist at Uppsala Astronomical Observatory	MPC · 10265
10266 Vladishukhov	1978 SA_{7}	Vladimir Shukhov (1853–1939), Russian engineer and inventor of the water-tube boiler	MPC · 10266
10267 Giuppone	1978 VD_{7}	Cristian Giuppone (born 1979) is an Argentine astronomer at the Cordoba Astronomical Observatory investigating the co-orbital three-body problem with dissipation, with applications to planetary and small bodies dynamics.	JPL · 10267
10269 Tusi	1979 SU_{11}	Nasīr al-Dīn al-Tūsī †	MPC · 10269
10270 Skoglöv	1980 FX_{3}	Erik Skoglöv (born 1968), a Swedish astronomer at Uppsala Observatory	MPC · 10270
10271 Dymond	1980 TV_{2}	Garrett (Garry) Dymond (b. 1956), an amateur astronomer with RASC St. John's Centre in Newfoundland who won an RASC Service Award in 1994.	IAU · 10271
10272 Yuko	1981 EF_{13}	Yuko Kimura (born 1981) is an administrative associate at the National Astronomical Observatory of Japan who organizes international collaboration programs promoting studies of asteroids.	JPL · 10272
10273 Katvolk	1981 ED_{14}	Kathryn Volk (born 1985) completed her PhD at the University of Arizona investigating the long-term dynamical evolution of Centaur asteroids and the Kuiper Belt.	JPL · 10273
10274 Larryevans	1981 ET_{15}	Larry Evans (born 1943) is an expert in gamma-ray, x-ray and neutron spectroscopy, including the analysis and interpretation of data collected by the NEAR mission to (433) Eros.	JPL · 10274
10275 Nathankaib	1981 EC_{16}	Nathan Kaib (born 1980) is a professor at the University of Oklahoma who specializes in the formation and evolution of planetary systems, in particular the outer solar system.	JPL · 10275
10276 Matney	1981 EK_{23}	Mark Matney (born 1963) is a scientist at the Johnson Space Center.	JPL · 10276
10277 Micheli	1981 EC_{27}	Marco Micheli (born 1983), an Italian discoverer of minor planets, researcher at ESA's SSA programme NEO Coordination Centre and a member of the Pan-STARRS1 survey's NEO search team studying meteor streams	JPL · 10277
10278 Virkki	1981 EW_{30}	Anne Virkki (born 1988) is a postdoctoral scholar at the Arecibo Observatory who studies near-Earth asteroids, specializing in understanding the properties of asteroid surfaces and regolith using radar scattering measurements.	JPL · 10278
10279 Rhiannonblaauw	1981 ET_{42}	Rhiannon Blaauw (born 1986) is a scientist working at the NASA Meteoroid Environment Office.	JPL · 10279
10280 Yequanzhi	1981 EA_{43}	Ye Quan-Zhi (born 1988), a Chinese postdoctoral researcher at Caltech and discoverer of minor planets, who studies the transitions between asteroids and comets and associated meteor streams.	JPL · 10280
10281 Libourel	1981 EE_{45}	Guy Libourel (born 1956) is a cosmochemist at Observatoire de la Côte d´Azur (France) whose research includes the petrology and formation of chondrules.	JPL · 10281
10282 Emilykramer	1981 ET_{46}	Emily Kramer (born 1986) is a postdoctoral researcher at the Jet Propulsion Laboratory who uses visible and thermal wavelength measurements to estimate the amount of mass shed by comets throughout their orbits.	JPL · 10282
10283 Cromer	1981 JE_{2}	Teachers Michael (born 1941) and Sarah (born 1945) Cromer, of Flagstaff, Arizona	JPL · 10283
10284 Damienlemay	1981 QY_{2}	Damien Lemay (b. 1943) earned an undergraduate degree in physics from Laval University in Quebec, Canada, and worked as a telecommunications engineer. He founded a local astronomy club in Rimouski and served a term as RASC national President. He won the RASC Chant Medal, mainly for a photographic atlas of the northern sky, made with a 0.14-m Schmidt camera.	IAU · 10284
10285 Renémichelsen	1982 QX_{1}	René Michelsen, a Danish astronomer and discoverer of minor planets	MPC · 10285
10286 Shnollia	1982 SM_{6}	Simon Shnoll, Russian biophysicist	MPC · 10286
10287 Smale	1982 UK_{7}	American mathematician Stephen Smale (born 1930) is a member of the National Academy of Sciences.	JPL · 10287
10288 Saville	1983 WN	Curt Saville (1946–2001) was an avid ocean and arctic explorer. He rowed across both the Atlantic and Pacific oceans. Saville also worked to encourage scientific exploration of the Earth and space. The name was suggested by P. C. Thomas	JPL · 10288
10289 Geoffperry	1984 QS	Geoffrey Perry (1927–2000), a physics teacher at Kettering Grammar School, England, taught his students to monitor radio signals from Soviet satellites. His group of students discovered the Plesetsk launch site and became the most reliable public source of space information during the Cold War.	JPL · 10289
10290 Kettering	1985 SR	Kettering Group, the satellite tracking group established by Geoffrey Perry at the school at which he taught. The group monitored and analyzed radio transmissions from Soviet satellites, often scooping official news media.	JPL · 10290
10293 Pribina	1986 TU_{6}	Pribina (c. 800–861), a Slavic prince and first Slavic ruler to build a Christian church on Slavic territory in Nitra	JPL · 10293
10295 Hippolyta	1988 GB	Hippolyta, from Greek mythology, was one of the greatest queens of the Amazons. She wore a beautiful golden girdle, a gift from her father Ares, the war-god, as a symbol of her Amazonian queenship. Heracles was sent by the Greeks to acquire the girdle, a battle took place, and beautiful Hippolyta died.	JPL · 10295
10296 Rominadisisto	1988 RQ_{12}	Romina Paula Di Sisto (born 1970) is an astronomer at the La Plata University of Argentina whose research includes the dynamics and collisional evolution of Centaurs, Jupiter family comets, and Hilda and Trojan asteroids.	JPL · 10296
10297 Lynnejones	1988 RJ_{13}	Rhiannon Lynne Allen (R. Lynne Jones) (born 1973) is a researcher at the University of Washington working to optimize the performance of the Large Synoptic Survey Telescope for solar system science.	JPL · 10297
10298 Jiangchuanhuang	1988 SU_{2}	Jiangchuan Huang (born 1961) served as the chief designer of the Chang'e 2 satellite, which in 2008 executed a fly-by of (4179) Toutatis.	JPL · 10298
10300 Tanakadate	1989 EG_{1}	Tanakadate Aikitsu (1856–1952), a Japanese geophysicist and founder of the International Latitude Observatory at Mizusawa, Iwate	JPL · 10300

== 10301–10400 ==
back to top

Named minor planet	Provisional	This minor planet was named for...	Ref · Catalog
10301 Kataoka	1989 FH	Yoshiko Kataoka (born 1927), an amateur astronomer in Takarazuka, Hyogo prefecture, is a director of the Oriental Astronomical Association.	JPL · 10301
10303 Fréret	1989 RD_{2}	French historian Nicolas Fréret (1688–1749)	JPL · 10303
10304 Iwaki	1989 SY	Masae Iwaki (born 1933), an amateur astronomer in Oita, is the winner of the Vega Prize for distinguished women amateur astronomers.	JPL · 10304
10305 Grignard	1989 YP_{5}	Fernand (Ferre) Grignard (1939–1982)	JPL · 10305
10306 Pagnol	1990 QY	Marcel Pagnol (1895–1974) was a French writer.	JPL · 10306
10307 Carlschmidt	1990 QX_{1}	Carl A. Schmidt, American planetary scientist at Boston University.	IAU · 10307
10310 Delacroix	1990 QZ_{8}	Eugène Delacroix (1798–1863), a French painter.	JPL · 10310
10311 Fantin-Latour	1990 QL_{9}	Henri Fantin-Latour (1836–1904), a French painter, was known for his still-life paintings with flowers and later for his lithographs.	JPL · 10311
10313 Vanessa-Mae	1990 QW_{17}	Vanessa-Mae (born 1978), a Singaporean-British violinist, created a "bridge between classical and popular music". Her debut album in 1995 sold two million copies.	JPL · 10313
10315 Brewster	1990 SC_{4}	Stephen Singer-Brewster (born 1945), a former member of the Palomar Planet Crossing Asteroid Survey, has had a long fascination with astronomy. He is a member of the Outer Planets project at the Jet Propulsion Laboratory and a member of the board of trustees of Stony Ridge Observatory. He discovered comet 105P.	JPL · 10315
10316 Williamturner	1990 SF_{9}	William Turner (1508–1568), British ornithologist and "Father of English Botany", is best known for his book A New Herball.	JPL · 10316
10318 Sumaura	1990 TX	Sumaura Elementary School, established in 1902, is the oldest private elementary school in Kobe.	JPL · 10318
10319 Toshiharu	1990 TB_{1}	Toshiharu Hatanaka (born 1962), a research associate in the department of information and knowledge engineering at Tottori University, is president of the Tottori Society of Astronomy	JPL · 10319
10320 Reiland	1990 TR_{1}	Charles Thomas Reiland (born 1946), for many years president of the Amateur Astronomers Association of Pittsburgh, initiated the Wagman Observatory, observed in the Allegheny Observatory's astrometry program and promoted public interest in astronomy.	JPL · 10320
10321 Rampo	1990 UN_{2}	Rampo Edogawa (Hirai Taro, 1894–1965), born in Nabari city, Mie prefecture, was a writer who specialized in Japan's mystery genre. He was popular with young readers, and one of his best-known novels is The Boy Detectives Club.	JPL · 10321
10322 Mayuminarita	1990 VT_{1}	Mayumi Narita (born 1970) is a Japanese swimmer who is a paraplegic. At the Paralympic Games in Sydney in 2000, she won six gold medals and one silver medal. She also won two gold, two silver and one bronze in Atlanta in 1996	JPL · 10322
10323 Frazer	1990 VW_{6}	James George Frazer (1854–1941) is best remembered for The Golden Bough, a study in comparative religion (in 12 volumes).	JPL · 10323
10324 Vladimirov	1990 VB_{14}	Vladimir Alekseevich Vladimirov (born 1951) is an authority on stability theory in hydrodynamics and biophysical hydrodynamics. He is a professor of applied mathematics at the University of York. The name was suggested by V. J. Judovich	JPL · 10324
10325 Bexa	1990 WB_{2}	The iceberg B10A, which measures some 80 km by 40 km, broke off from the Thwaites glacier in Antarctica in 1992. Having taken hundreds of thousands of years to form, B10A now drifts in the South Atlantic driven by marine currents and wind	JPL · 10325
10326 Kuragano	1990 WS_{2}	Sukehikro Kuragano (born 1933) is a member of Kawasaki Astronomical Association and has been an amateur observer of variable stars for about half a century. He independently discovered Comet C/1957 P1 (Mrkos) while he was climbing Mt. Fuji	JPL · 10326
10327 Batens	1990 WQ_{6}	Diderik Batens (born 1944) is a member of the philosophy department at the University of Ghent.	JPL · 10327
10330 Durkheim	1991 GH_{3}	Émile Durkheim (1858–1917), a French sociologist, was convinced that ethical and social structures were endangered by the advent of technology and mechanization.	JPL · 10330
10331 Peterbluhm	1991 GM_{10}	Peter Bluhm (1942–1997), a German Computer specialist, was known for his efforts in electronic communication among amateur astronomers in Germany since the early 1980s. In 1987 he founded the first Astronomical Bulletin Board System in Dahlenburg. The name was suggested by A. Doppler.	JPL · 10331
10332 Défi	1991 JT_{1}	Défi Corporatif Canderel is a fundraising event for cancer research programs at universities in Montreal. Founded by Jonathan Wener, the event has been directed by Gerald Levy since its inception in 1990. It features a costumed run through the streets of Montreal and has raised more than three million dollars.	JPL · 10332
10333 Portnoff	1991 NZ_{6}	Morrie Portnoff (born 1957) was President (2014–2020) of the RASC Montreal Centre.	IAU · 10333
10334 Gibbon	1991 PG_{5}	Edward Gibbon (1737–1794), a British historian.	JPL · 10334
10340 Jostjahn	1991 RT_{40}	Jost Jahn (born 1959), German amateur astronomer and discoverer of minor planets	MPC · 10340
10343 Church	1991 VW_{8}	Frederic Edwin Church (1826–1900), an American painter, one of several artists of the Hudson River School.	JPL · 10343
10344 Llanodelhato	1992 CA_{2}	Llano del Hato, a village located in the Venezuelan Andes.	IAU · 10344
10346 Triathlon	1992 GA_{1}	Since Pam Truty founded the Burn Lake Triathlon in Las Cruces, New Mexico, in 1984, the relay team of Wendee Wallach-Levy, Laura Wright and Barbara Pardo has won medals every year, including 14 golds. Laura has also done more than 30 years volunteer work for the American Red Cross.	JPL · 10346
10347 Murom	1992 HG_{4}	Murom, Russia, on the left bank of the Oka river	JPL · 10347
10348 Poelchau	1992 HL_{4}	Harald Poelchau (1903–1972), a German theologian, socialist and humanist.	JPL · 10348
10350 Spallanzani	1992 OG_{2}	Lazzaro Spallanzani (1729–1799), an Italian biologist, was known for his research on the spontaneous generation of cellular life. He also proved that microbes come from the air, paving the way for Pasteur.	JPL · 10350
10351 Seiichisato	1992 SE_{1}	Seiichi Sato (born 1930) is a member of Kawasaki Astronomical Association.	JPL · 10351
10352 Kawamura	1992 UO_{3}	Mikio Kawamura (born 1931) is a member of Kawasaki Astronomical Association. He is a mechanical engineer by profession and has published five books on telescope-making.	JPL · 10352
10353 Momotaro	1992 YS_{2}	In a Japanese folk tale Momotaro, the Peach Boy, came out of a big peach and fought off ogres with his partners---a dog, a monkey and a pheasant	JPL · 10353
10354 Guillaumebudé	1993 BU_{5}	Guillaume Budé (1468–1540) was one of the first philologists in France to teach himself classical Greek.	JPL · 10354
10355 Kojiroharada	1993 EQ	Kojiro Harada (born 1926), mechanical engineer, is a member of Kawasaki Astronomical Association.	JPL · 10355
10356 Rudolfsteiner	1993 RQ_{4}	Rudolf Steiner (1861–1925), Austrian thinker, who was the editor of the scientific works of Wolfgang Goethe.	JPL · 10356
10358 Kirchhoff	1993 TH_{32}	Gustav Kirchhoff (1824–1887) was a German physicist who, together with Robert Bunsen, founded the discipline of spectrum analysis. They demonstrated that an element gives off a characteristic colored light when heated to incandescence.	JPL · 10358
10361 Bunsen	1994 PR_{20}	Robert Bunsen (1811–1899) was a German chemist who discovered the alkali-group metals cesium and rubidium. He also found an antidote to arsenic poisoning (1834) and invented the carbon-zinc electric cell (1841). He is also remembered for the development of the Bunsen burner.	JPL · 10361
10364 Tainai	1994 VR_{1}	Tainai-Daira is a hilly district in Kurokawa Village, north of Niigata prefecture. Since 1984, the village has become the venue of the "Tainai Hoshi Matsuri".	JPL · 10364
10365 Kurokawa	1994 WL_{1}	Kurokawa is a small village with a mere 1800 population, located in northern Niigata prefecture.	JPL · 10365
10366 Shozosato	1994 WD_{4}	Shozo Sato (born 1943) is a maker and repairman of art clocks. He is an experienced lunar photographer.	JPL · 10366
10367 Sayo	1994 YL_{1}	Sayo is a town in Hyogo prefecture where the Nishi-Harima Astronomical Observatory is situated. The town was declared the Town of Stars in 1990	JPL · 10367
10368 Kozuki	1995 CM_{1}	Kozuki is a town in Hyogo prefecture where the Nishi-Harima Astronomical Observatory is situated. The emblem of Kozuki Town is the waning moon	JPL · 10368
10369 Sinden	1995 CE_{2}	David Sinden (born 1932), as chief optician for Grubb-Parsons of Newcastle upon Tyne, was responsible for the optical components of the Isaac Newton, Anglo-Australian and U.K. Schmidt telescopes. In 1979, he founded the Sinden Optical Company, which in 2003 restored Thomas Grubb's first reflector (1834)	JPL · 10369
10370 Hylonome	1995 DW_{2}	In Greek myth, Hylonome was in love with Cyllaros, who was accidentally killed by a javelin thrown at a wedding. On witnessing this, Hylonome threw herself on the javelin and died.	JPL · 10370
10371 Gigli	1995 DU_{3}	Paolo Gigli, Italian astronomer and co-founder of the Pian dei Termini Observatory. Early on, Gigli's main interests concerned the study of variable stars and the observation of the Sun. Later he became a speaker on astronomy at the observatory.	JPL · 10371
10372 Moran	1995 FO_{10}	Landscape artist Thomas Moran (1837–1926) focused his work on the American frontier, from the shores of Lake Superior to the "Grand Canyon of the Yellowstone". His illustrations of the west appeared in Harper's Weekly and The Aldine, among others. He participated in John Wesley Powell's 1873 expedition to the Grand Canyon	JPL · 10372
10373 MacRobert	1996 ER	Alan MacRobert (born 1951) is an editor of Sky & Telescope.	JPL · 10373
10374 Etampes	1996 GN_{19}	Étampes, France	JPL · 10374
10375 Michiokuga	1996 HM_{1}	Michio Kuga (1927–1999), high school teacher and from 1971 to 1982 curator at the Yamaguchi Museum.	JPL · 10375
10376 Chiarini	1996 KW	Francesca (born 1981) and Gabriele (born 1986) Chiarini are grandchildren of Giorgio Sassi, co-founder of Osservatorio San Vittore.	JPL · 10376
10377 Kilimanjaro	1996 NN_{4}	Kilimanjaro, a dormant volcano and the highest mountain in Africa	JPL · 10377
10378 Ingmarbergman	1996 NE_{5}	Ingmar Bergman (1918–2007), a Swedish theatre and film director who has achieved fame with films such as The Seventh Seal (1956) and Wild Strawberries (1957).	JPL · 10378
10379 Lake Placid	1996 OH	Lake Placid is a town in northern New York State in the U.S. that hosted the 1932 and 1980 Olympic Winter Games, Lake Placid is also the birthplace of the discoverer.	JPL · 10379
10380 Berwald	1996 PY_{7}	Franz Berwald (1796–1868), a Swedish composer.	JPL · 10380
10381 Malinsmith	1996 RB	Konrad Malin-Smith (born 1934), a retired science teacher.	JPL · 10381
10382 Hadamard	1996 RJ_{3}	Jacques Hadamard (1865–1963), French mathematician, who made major contributions to the theory of functions of a complex variable and the study of the partial differential equations of mathematical physics. In 1896 he gave a proof of the prime number theorem that defines the frequency of prime numbers among the integers (also see Hadamard transform).	JPL · 10382
10385 Amaterasu	1996 TL_{12}	Amaterasu-oomikami, the mythical Japanese goddess of the sun, was born from the left eye of the god Izanaki and ruled the world of the heaven Takamagahara. To protest the misconduct of her younger brother, the god Susanoo, she hid in the cave called Ama-no-iwayado, and the world fell into complete darkness	JPL · 10385
10386 Romulus	1996 TS_{15}	Romulus, first king of Rome, reigned from 753 to 716 BC. Legend has it that the twins Romulus and Remus were saved from the Tiber river by the wolf that raised them. In the first year of this reign Romulus founded the city. He was deified as Quirinus.	JPL · 10386
10387 Bepicolombo	1996 UQ	Giuseppe (Bepi) Colombo (1920–1984), an Italian mathematician and astronomer at the University of Padova.	JPL · 10387
10388 Zhuguangya	1996 YH_{3}	Chinese nuclear scientist Zhu Guangya (born 1924) made many contributions to nuclear physics and atomic energy technologies and helped develop China's atomic energy program	JPL · 10388
10389 Robmanning	1997 LD	Rob Manning (born 1958) was the Flight System Chief Engineer for the successful Mars Pathfinder mission at JPL. He was responsible for all technical aspects of the Pathfinder spacecraft. He also led the team that designed, developed, tested and operated Pathfinder's entry, descent and landing system	JPL · 10389
10390 Lenka	1997 QD_{1}	Lenka Šarounová (born 1973), an astronomer at the Ondřejov Observatory.	JPL · 10390
10392 Brace	1997 RP_{7}	DeWitt Bristol Brace (1858–1905), who founded the department of physics and astronomy at the University of Nebraska in 1888.	JPL · 10392
10395 Jirkahorn	1997 SZ_{1}	Jiří Horn (1941–1994), an astronomer at the Ondřejov Observatory. He worked in stellar astrophysics, observational astronomy and data reduction.	JPL · 10395
10399 Nishiharima	1997 UZ_{8}	Nishiharima is the southwestern area of Hyogo prefecture and site of the Nishi-Harima Astronomical Observatory	JPL · 10399
10400 Hakkaisan	1997 VX	Hakkaisan is a sacred mountain in Niigata prefecture, where religious training is carried out. The astronomical observatory of Nihon University has been located on the hillside since 1992	JPL · 10400

== 10401–10500 ==
back to top

Named minor planet	Provisional	This minor planet was named for...	Ref · Catalog
10401 Masakoba	1997 VD_{3}	Masateru Kobayashi (born 1953) is a Japanese amateur astronomer and the chairperson of the Astronomical Society of Yamaguchi prefecture. He has served as a guide at numerous stargazing meetings, and has planned and conducted many total solar eclipse tours.	IAU · 10401
10403 Marcelgrün	1997 WU_{3}	Marcel Grün (born 1946), Czech astronomer and director of the Prague Planetarium	MPC · 10403
10404 McCall	1997 WP_{14}	Robert T. McCall (1919–2010). His works include murals at the National Air and Space Museum and illustrations for 2001: A Space Odyssey.	JPL · 10404
10405 Yoshiaki	1997 WT_{23}	Yoshiaki Mogami (1546–1614), a military commander during the Japanese feudal period.	JPL · 10405
10410 Yangguanghua	1997 XR_{9}	Yang Guanghua (1923–2006) was a chemical engineer and an educationalist.	JPL · 10410
10412 Tsukuyomi	1997 YO_{4}	Tsukuyomi-no-mikoto, the Japanese god of night and the moon, was born from the right eye of the god Izanami no kami (Izanaki). It is said that he made his older sister, the goddess Amaterasu, very angry and caused the separate appearance of the sun in the day and the moon at night.	JPL · 10412
10413 Pansecchi	1997 YG_{20}	Luigi Pansecchi (born 1940).	JPL · 10413
10415 Mali Lošinj	1998 UT_{15}	Mali Lošinj, Croatian island and city, known for its nautical school and the Leo Brenner Astronomical Society	JPL · 10415
10416 Kottler	1998 VA_{32}	Herbert Kottler (born 1939), MIT Lincoln Laboratory associate director in 1984–1996.	JPL · 10416
10421 Dalmatin	1999 AY_{6}	Herman Dalmatin (Hermanus Dalmata), 12th-century Croatian translator of astronomical and mathematical Arabic books	JPL · 10421
10423 Dajčić	1999 BB	Mario Dajčić (1923–1991), Croatian amateur astronomer, telescope builder and educator, founder of the Astronomical Society of Pula	JPL · 10423
10424 Gaillard	1999 BD_{5}	Boris Gaillard (born 1976) is an amateur astronomer and software engineer.	JPL · 10424
10425 Landfermann	1999 BE_{6}	Dietrich Wilhelm Landfermann (1800–1882), a German educator.	JPL · 10425
10426 Charlierouse	1999 BB_{27}	Charles (Charlie) Rouse (1924–1988), an American jazz tenor saxophonist.	JPL · 10426
10427 Klinkenberg	2017 P-L	Dirk Klinkenberg, Dutch mathematician and astronomer, discoverer of several comets †	MPC · 10427
10428 Wanders	2073 P-L	Adriaan Wanders (1903–1984), Dutch astronomer, author, and researcher of sunspots.	MPC · 10428
10429 van Woerden	2546 P-L	Hugo van Woerden (born 1926), Dutch astronomer who studied neutral hydrogen in galaxies	MPC · 10429
10430 Martschmidt	4030 P-L	Maarten Schmidt (1929–2022), Dutch-born American astronomer	MPC · 10430
10431 Pottasch	4042 P-L	Stuart R. Pottasch (born 1932), American astrophysics professor and expert on planetary nebulae	MPC · 10431
10432 Ullischwarz	4623 P-L	Ulrich Schwarz (born 1932), Dutch radio astronomer	MPC · 10432
10433 Ponsen	4716 P-L	Jaap Ponsen (1931–1961), Dutch astronomer on variable stars, who observed at the Leiden Southern Station in South Africa	MPC · 10433
10434 Tinbergen	4722 P-L	Jaap Tinbergen (born 1934), Dutch radio astronomer	MPC · 10434
10435 Tjeerd	6064 P-L	Tjeerd van Albada (born 1936), Dutch astronomer	MPC · 10435
10436 Janwillempel	6073 P-L	Jan Willem Pel (born 1943), Dutch astronomer and photometrist, project leader for a spectrograph on the VLT	MPC · 10436
10437 van der Kruit	6085 P-L	Pieter van der Kruit (born 1944), Dutch radio astronomer	MPC · 10437
10438 Ludolph	6615 P-L	Ludolph van Ceulen (1540–1610), Dutch mathematician who calculated the value of Pi to 35 decimal places	MPC · 10438
10439 van Schooten	6676 P-L	Frans van Schooten (1615–1660), Dutch mathematician	MPC · 10439
10440 van Swinden	7636 P-L	Jean Henri van Swinden (1746–1823), Dutch mathematician and physicist	MPC · 10440
10441 van Rijckevorsel	9076 P-L	Elie van Rijckevorsel (1845–1928), who collaborated on the first geomagnetic survey in the Netherlands	MPC · 10441
10442 Biezenzo	4062 T-1	Cornelis Biezenzo (1888–1975), Dutch physicist	MPC · 10442
10443 van der Pol	1045 T-2	Balthasar van der Pol, Dutch experimental physicist †	MPC · 10443
10444 de Hevesy	3290 T-2	George de Hevesy, Hungarian chemist †	MPC · 10444
10445 Coster	4090 T-2	Dirk Coster, Dutch chemist and co-discoverer of the element Hafnium †	MPC · 10445
10446 Siegbahn	3006 T-3	Kai Siegbahn, Swedish physicist, winner of the 1981 Nobel Prize in physics.	JPL · 10446
10447 Bloembergen	3357 T-3	Nicolaas Bloembergen, Dutch physicist, winner of the 1981 Nobel Prize in physics †	MPC · 10447
10448 Schawlow	4314 T-3	Arthur Leonard Schawlow, American physicist, winner of the 1981 Nobel Prize in Physics.	JPL · 10448
10449 Takuma	1936 UD	Hitoshi Takuma (born 1949), an active solar observer in Japan.	JPL · 10449
10450 Girard	1967 JQ	Terrence Girard (born 1957), American astronomer	JPL · 10450
10452 Zuev	1976 SQ_{7}	Vladimir Evseevich Zuev (born 1925), a professor at Tomsk University, is a scientist in the field of atmospheric physics.	JPL · 10452
10453 Banzan	1977 DY_{3}	Kumazawa Banzan (1619–1691), a Confucian scholar in the Edo period.	JPL · 10453
10454 Vallenar	1978 NY	Vallenar, capital of the Chilean province of Huasco, is located some 90 km north of the La Silla observatory site.	JPL · 10454
10455 Donnison	1978 NU_{3}	John Donnison (born 1948), British astronomer	MPC · 10455
10456 Anechka	1978 PS_{2}	Anya (Anechka) Ivanchenko (1987–1999), daughter of a friend of the discoverer Nikolai Chernykh	JPL · 10456
10457 Suminov	1978 QE_{2}	Vyacheslav Mikhailovich Suminov (born 1932), a professor and head of the faculty at the Moscow Aviation-Technological Institute.	JPL · 10457
10458 Sfranke	1978 RM_{7}	Sigbrit Franke (born 1942), Swedish educator	MPC · 10458
10459 Vladichaika	1978 SJ_{5}	Vladimir Dmitrievich Chaika, Ukrainian naval architect	JPL · 10459
10460 Correa-Otto	1978 VK_{8}	Jorge Correa-Otto (born 1981) is an Argentine astronomer at San Juan National University.	JPL · 10460
10461 Dawilliams	1978 XU	David Allen Williams (born 1966), an associate research professor in Earth & Space Exploration at Arizona State University	MPC · 10461
10462 Saxogrammaticus	1979 KM	Saxo Grammaticus (c.1150–1220) was secretary to Bishop Absalon, the founder of Copenhagen. He is the author of the comprehensive Gesta Danorum (Deeds of the Danes).	JPL · 10462
10463 Bannister	1979 MB_{9}	Michele Bannister (born 1986) is a postdoctoral research fellow at Queen's University Belfast whose work includes surveys to discover and characterize trans-Neptunian objects.	JPL · 10463
10464 Jessie	1979 SC	Jessica Lynne Peterson, from Harvard MA, (1994–2009).	JPL · 10464
10465 Olkin	1980 WE_{5}	Catherine B. Olkin (born 1966) is a researcher at Southwest Research Institute (Boulder, Colorado), Deputy Project Scientist for the New Horizons mission and Deputy Principal Investigator for the Lucy mission. Her studies include stellar occultations, color compositional analysis of the Pluto system, and the study of Trojans.	JPL · 10465
10466 Marius-Ioan	1981 ET_{7}	Marius-Ioan Piso (born 1954) is President of the Romanian Space Agency (ROSA) and a leading advocate for space research in Romania.	JPL · 10466
10467 Peterbus	1981 EZ_{7}	Peter Bus (1951–2016) was a Dutch amateur astronomer and founding member of the Dutch Comet Section of the Royal Dutch Association for Meteorology and Astronomy.	JPL · 10467
10468 Itacuruba	1981 EH_{9}	Itacuruba (Nova Itacuruba), a town in Pernambuco, Brazil, and location of the Observatório Astronômico do Sertão de Itaparica (OASI). The original city was flooded in 1988 in forming Itaparica Lake.	JPL · 10468
10469 Krohn	1981 EE_{14}	Katrin Krohn (born 1984) is a researcher at the German Aerospace Center (DLR-Berlin) studying cryogenic flow features and cryovolcanism on Ceres using Dawn spacecraft data.	JPL · 10469
10470 Bartczak	1981 EW_{18}	Przemysł aw Bartczak (born 1974) is a researcher at the Astronomical Observatory of the Adam Mickiewic University in Poznan, Poland who studies asteroid lightcurve inversion techniques that yield both convex and non-convex shape and spin solutions.	JPL · 10470
10471 Marciniak	1981 EH_{20}	Anna Marciniak (born 1979) is a Polish researcher at the Poznań Observatory (047) of the Adam Mickiewicz University in Poznań, studying the spin and shape properties of long-period main-belt asteroids.	JPL · 10471
10472 Santana-Ros	1981 EO_{20}	Toni Santana-Ros (born 1984) is a postdoctoral researcher at the Astronomical Observatory of the Adam Mickiewic University in Poznan, Poland where he performs photometric measurements of small bodies in support of the Gaia mission.	JPL · 10472
10473 Thirouin	1981 EL_{21}	Audrey Thirouin (born 1984) is a researcher at the Lowell Observatory who performs photometric measurements of trans-Neptunian objects investigating differences in binary and non-binary populations.	JPL · 10473
10474 Pecina	1981 EJ_{23}	Petr Pecina (born 1950) is a retired astronomer from the Czech Academy of Sciences.	JPL · 10474
10475 Maxpoilâne	1981 EX_{28}	Max Poilâne (born 1941) is a Parisian baker.	JPL · 10475
10476 Los Molinos	1981 EY_{38}	The Los Molinos Observatory located north of Montevideo, Uruguay. It is actively involved in follow-up observations of asteroids and comets.	JPL · 10476
10477 Lacumparsita	1981 ET_{41}	The song La cumparsita	JPL · 10477
10478 Alsabti	1981 WO	Abdul Athem Alsabti (born 1945), astrophysicist who introduced astronomy teaching into Iraq in 1970 and founded the Iraqi Astronomical Society.	JPL · 10478
10479 Yiqunchen	1982 HJ	Yiqun Chen (born 1968) is a Chinese artist.	JPL · 10479
10480 Jennyblue	1982 JB_{2}	Jennifer S. Blue (born 1954), of the U.S. Geological Survey, Flagstaff, Arizona, has been the sine qua non of the IAU Working Group on Planetary System Nomenclature since 1995, serving both as its secretary and as the keeper of the Gazetteer of Planetary Nomenclature	JPL · 10480
10481 Esipov	1982 QK_{3}	Valentin Feodorovich Esipov (born 1933), head of the radioastronomy department at the Sternberg Astronomical Institute, Moscow University.	JPL · 10481
10482 Dangrieser	1983 RG_{2}	Daniel Grieser (1926–1999), an optical engineer with Battelle Memorial Institute in Columbus, Ohio.	JPL · 10482
10483 Tomburns	1983 RP_{2}	Tom Burns (born 1952) was the Director of Perkins Observatory.	JPL · 10483
10484 Hecht	1983 WM	Martin D. Hecht (born 1926), a volunteer to help organize the Lowell Observatory's archives.	JPL · 10484
10485 Sarahyeomans	1984 SY_{5}	Sarah Katherine Yeomans (born 1974) received her Ph.D. from the University of Southern California in 2021 with a thesis on Roman civic medicine.	IAU · 10485
10486 Teron	1985 CS_{2}	Chris Teron (b. 1957), a Canadian architect and amateur astronomer	IAU · 10486
10487 Danpeterson	1985 GP_{1}	Dan Peterson (born 1949) was a smokejumper and is now a juvenile probation director.	JPL · 10487
10489 Keinonen	1985 TJ_{1}	Juhani Keinonen (born 1946) was a professor at the Department of Physics, University of Helsinki.	JPL · 10489
10491 Chou	1986 QS_{1}	B. Ralph Chou (b. 1951), Professor of optometry at the University of Waterloo and an authority on solar-eclipse eye safety.	IAU · 10491
10492 Mizzi	1986 QZ_{1}	Edward Michael Mizzi (b. 1953), a retired teacher and amateur astronomer who served as President of RASC Hamilton Centre.	IAU · 10492
10493 Pulliah	1986 QH_{2}	Linda (née Robins) Pulliah (1956–2022) worked as a nurse and was an outreach volunteer with the RASC Sudbury Centre. She created a sense of wonder under starry skies in Northern Ontario’s parks for all ages and excelled in explaining complex science with analogies and engaging activities. She inspired colleagues locally and nationally to promote astronomy.	IAU · 10493
10494 Jenniferwest	1986 QO_{3}	Jennifer West (b. 1979) earned her PhD in Astronomy at the University of Manitoba in Winnipeg and joined the Dunlap Institute at the University of Toronto in 2016. She received the Dark Sky Defender Award from the International Dark Sky Association in 2011 and the RASC's Ken Chilton Prize in 2010 for her contributions to astronomy education and outreach.	IAU · 10494
10498 Bobgent	1986 RG_{3}	Robert Gent (born 1947) was a U.S. Air Force space systems officer,.	JPL · 10498
10499 Sarty	1986 RN_{5}	Gordon Eric Sarty (b. 1960) is an astronomer who has lectured in physics, mathematics, and statistics at the University of Saskatchewan.	IAU · 10499
10500 Nishi-koen	1987 GA	Nishi-koen park is the location of the Sendai Astronomical Observatory.	JPL · 10500

== 10501–10600 ==
back to top

Named minor planet	Provisional	This minor planet was named for...	Ref · Catalog
10501 Ardmacha	1987 OT	The Irish Gaelic name of the city of Armagh in Northern Ireland †	MPC · 10501
10502 Armaghobs	1987 QF_{6}	Armagh Observatory, Ireland †	MPC · 10502
10503 Johnmarks	1987 SG_{13}	John D. Marks (born 1943), an American political writer, founder and former president of Search for Common Ground (SFCG), an international non-profit organization.	IAU · 10503
10504 Doga	1987 UF_{5}	Eugenij Dmitrievich Doga (born 1937), a Russian composer.	JPL · 10504
10505 Johnnycash	1988 BN_{4}	Johnny Cash (1932–2003), an American singer, songwriter, musician, and actor, nicknamed "The Man in Black" for his trademark all-black stage wardrobe.	IAU · 10505
10506 Rydberg	1988 CW_{4}	Johannes Rydberg, 19th–20th-century Swedish physicist, after whom the Rydberg constant is named	JPL · 10506
10508 Haughey	1988 RM_{4}	Ronald Haughey (b. 1962), a Canadian amateur astronomer	IAU · 10508
10509 Heinrichkayser	1989 GD_{4}	Heinrich Gustav Johannes Kayser, 19th–20th-century German physicist who demonstrated the presence of helium in the Earth's atmosphere	JPL · 10509
10510 Maxschreier	1989 GQ_{4}	Max Schreier (1907–1997), Austrian-born Bolivian astronomer, founder of observatories in Santa Ana and Patacamaya, and author of Einstein desde los Andes de Bolivia	JPL · 10510
10512 Yamandu	1989 TP_{11}	Yamandu Alejandro Fernandez (1927–2010)	JPL · 10512
10513 Mackie	1989 TJ_{14}	Guy Thomas Mackie (b. 1955), an amateur astronomer in British Columbia, Canada.	IAU · 10513
10514 Harlow	1989 TD_{16}	Scott Harlow (1963–2020), an amateur astronomer in British Columbia, Canada.	IAU · 10514
10515 Old Joe	1989 UB_{3}	"Old Joe" is the students' name for the Joseph Chamberlain Clock Tower at the University of Birmingham.	JPL · 10515
10516 Sakurajima	1989 VQ	Mount Sakurajima, a volcano on the southern tip of Kyūshū, Kagoshima prefecture, Japan.	MPC · 10516
10521 Jeremyhansen	1990 RW_{7}	Jeremy Roger Hansen (b. 1976), a Canadian astronaut.	IAU · 10521
10523 D'Haveloose	1990 SM_{6}	José D´Haveloose (1922–1996), a surgeon in the West Flanders town of Tielt.	JPL · 10523
10524 Maniewski	1990 SZ_{7}	Jan Maniewski (born 1933), a medical doctor in Antwerp.	JPL · 10524
10526 Ginkogino	1990 UK_{1}	Ginko Ogino (1851–1913) was a Japanese physician, who became the first registered woman doctor in Japan.	JPL · 10526
10529 Giessenburg	1990 WQ_{4}	Rudolf Charles d'Ablaing van Giessenburg (1826–1904), a Dutch writer, freemason and editor.	JPL · 10529
10538 Torode	1991 VP_{2}	In a 1992 study of 170 astrolabes, British industrial chemist Roland K. E. Torode (1923-2012) measured the ecliptic longitudes of the stars depicted and thereby determined, with allowance for precession, the ages of the instruments. He was also secretary of the Kidderminster Astronomical Society for several years.	JPL · 10538
10540 Hachigoroh	1991 VP_{4}	Hachigoroh Kikuchi (1926–1999) was the executive committee chief of the Haramura star party.	JPL · 10540
10541 Malesherbes	1991 YX	Guillaume-Chrétien de Lamoignon de Malesherbes (1721–1794), a botanist and a French statesman. He was guillotined for his defense of King Louis XVI.	JPL · 10541
10542 Ruckers	1992 CN_{3}	Hans Ruckers (1555–1623), a harpischord maker.	JPL · 10542
10543 Klee	1992 DL_{4}	Paul Klee (1879–1940), a Swiss painter and graphic artist.	JPL · 10543
10544 Hörsnebara	1992 DA_{9}	Hörsne and Bara Gotland parishes, Sweden, joined to become a single parish in 1883	JPL · 10544
10545 Källunge	1992 EQ_{9}	Källunge is a small parish on Gotland.	JPL · 10545
10546 Nakanomakoto	1992 FS_{1}	Makoto Nakano (born 1956), an associate professor in the Faculty of Education and Welfare Science at Oita University.	JPL · 10546
10547 Yosakoi	1992 JF	Yosakoi, a popular Japanese folk song about the forbidden love between a monk and a girl	JPL · 10547
10549 Helsingborg	1992 RM_{2}	Helsingborg, Sweden.	JPL · 10549
10550 Malmö	1992 RK_{7}	Malmö, Sweden.	JPL · 10550
10551 Göteborg	1992 YL_{2}	Gothenburg, Sweden.	JPL · 10551
10552 Stockholm	1993 BH_{13}	Stockholm, Sweden.	JPL · 10552
10553 Stenkumla	1993 FZ_{4}	Stenkumla is a small parish on the island Gotland.	JPL · 10553
10554 Västerhejde	1993 FO_{34}	Västerhejde socken on Gotland, Sweden.	JPL · 10554
10555 Tagaharue	1993 HH	Harue Taga (born 1951), astronomy curator of Chiba Municipal Planetarium.	JPL · 10555
10557 Rowland	1993 RL_{5}	Henry Augustus Rowland (1848–1901), American astronomer and first president of the American Physical Society.	JPL · 10557
10558 Karlstad	1993 RB_{7}	Karlstad, Sweden.	JPL · 10558
10559 Yukihisa	1993 SJ_{1}	Yukihisa Matsumoto (born 1962), a former researcher of the Nishi Mino Observatory.	JPL · 10559
10560 Michinari	1993 TN	Michinari Yamamoto (born 1970), a researcher at Ayabe City Observatory.	JPL · 10560
10561 Shimizumasahiro	1993 TE_{2}	Masahiro Shimizu (born 1956), the president of the Shimizu Clinic.	JPL · 10561
10563 Izhdubar	1993 WD	Izhdubar, an ancient Chaldean sun-god.	JPL · 10563
10566 Zabadak	1994 AZ_{2}	Zabadak is a name of a Japanese music group that is led by Tomohiko Kira. JPL	MPC · 10566
10567 Francobressan	1994 CV	Franco Bressan (born 1947), an Italian mathematics teacher and amateur astronomer.	JPL · 10567
10568 Yoshitanaka	1994 CF_{1}	Yoshiji Tanaka (1948–2003), a Japanese science magazine editor.	JPL · 10568
10569 Kinoshitamasao	1994 GQ	[Masao Kinoshita (born 1949) discovered that the number of radio-meteor echoes decreases as the radiant approaches the meridian. This is widely known as the Kinoshita effect.	JPL · 10569
10570 Shibayasuo	1994 GT	Yasuo Shiba (born 1961), a Japanese data manager of the Japan Meteor Society, specializing in fireballs	JPL · 10570
10572 Kominejo	1994 VO_{7}	Kominejo castle, in Shirakawa city	JPL · 10572
10573 Piani	1994 WU_{1}	Franco Piani (born 1955), Italian amateur astronomer.	JPL · 10573
10577 Jihčesmuzeum	1995 JC	Jihočeské muzeum (The South Bohemian Museum) was established in České Budějovice in 1877.	JPL · 10577
10579 Diluca	1995 OE	Roberto Di Luca (born 1959), amateur observer of lunar and asteroidal occultations, is network manager at the Astronomical Observatory of the University of Bologna. As a member of the Associazione Astrofili Bolognesi, he often collaborates with the group at the Osservatorio San Vittore in Bologna.	JPL · 10579
10581 Jeníkhollan	1995 OD_{1}	Jeník Hollan (born 1955), a Czech astronomer and environmentalist at the Brno Observatory.	JPL · 10581
10582 Harumi	1995 TG	Harumi Ikari (born 1957), wife of Japanese astronomer Yasukazu Ikari, who discovered the minor planet.	JPL · 10582
10583 Kanetugu	1995 WC_{4}	Kanetugu Naoe (1560–1619) was a Japanese military commander during the Japanese feudal period.	JPL · 10583
10584 Ferrini	1996 GJ_{2}	Federico Ferrini, Italian physicist and professor of astronomical techniques at the University of Pisa. He has published more than 100 scientific papers in major astronomical journals. These cover many subjects in modern theoretical astrophysics, among them planetology, star formation, the interstellar medium, galactic evolution and its cosmological effects. He is responsible for the Italian light pollution commission and is coordinator of the Mediterranean Astronomical Network.	JPL · 10584
10585 Wabi-Sabi	1996 GD_{21}	Wabi-sabi is a Japanese aesthetic centered around imperfection.	JPL · 10585
10586 Jansteen	1996 KY_{4}	Jan Havickszoon Steen (1626–1679) was a Dutch genre painter during the Dutch Golden Age. The name was suggested by W. Fröger.	JPL · 10586
10587 Strindberg	1996 NF_{3}	August Strindberg (1849–1912), a Swedish playwright and novelist. His works include Röda Rummet ("The Red Room", 1879), Fröken Julie ("Miss Julie", 1888) and Dödsdansen ("The Dance of Death", 1900).	JPL · 10587
10588 Adamcrandall	1996 OE	Adam Crandall Rees (born 1960), stepson of the discoverer, Paul G. Comba.	JPL · 10588
10589 Giusimicela	1996 OM_{2}	Giuseppina Micela (born 1959), an Italian astrophysicist and former Director of the Palermo Astronomical Observatory.	JPL · 10589
10590 Ragazzoni	1996 OP_{2}	Roberto Ragazzoni (born 1966), professor of astronomy at the university of Padua and member of the Accademia dei Lincei. He specialized in the design of optical instruments and innovative telescopes.	JPL · 10590
10591 Caverni	1996 PD_{3}	Raffaello Caverni (1837–1900), an Italian priest born in Montelupo.	JPL · 10591
10592 Chakrabarty	1996 PN_{5}	Prosanta Chakrabarty, American professor and Director and Curator of Fishes at the Museum of Natural Science at Louisiana State University.	IAU · 10592
10593 Susannesandra	1996 QQ_{1}	Susanne Sandness (born 1956), wife of American amateur astronomer Robert G. Sandness, who discovered the minor planet.	MPC · 10593
10596 Stevensimpson	1996 TS	Steven Simpson (born 1958).	JPL · 10596
10598 Markrees	1996 TT_{11}	Mark B. Rees (born 1963), stepson of the discoverer, Paul G. Comba	JPL · 10598

== 10601–10700 ==
back to top

Named minor planet	Provisional	This minor planet was named for...	Ref · Catalog
10601 Hiwatashi	1996 UC	Kenji Hiwatashi, electrical engineer at NHK (Japan Broadcasting Corporation) from 1947 to 1979.	JPL · 10601
10602 Masakazu	1996 UG_{3}	Masakazu Kusakabe (born 1946) is a ceramic artist, known for his design of the Smokeless Wood Fire Kiln.	JPL · 10602
10604 Susanoo	1996 VJ	Susanoo-no-mikoto is the Japanese god of heroes and the ancestor soul and a younger brother of the goddess Amaterasu.	JPL · 10604
10605 Guidoni	1996 VC_{1}	Umberto Guidoni, Italian astronaut †	MPC · 10605
10606 Crocco	1996 VD_{1}	Gaetano Arturo Crocco, Italian pioneer of aeronautics and space science †	MPC · 10606
10607 Amandahatton	1996 VQ_{6}	Amanda H. Hatton, the discoverer's stepdaughter.	JPL · 10607
10608 Mameta	1996 VB_{9}	Katsuhiko Mameta (born 1958), secretary of the Astronomical Society of Hyogo since 2000.	JPL · 10608
10609 Hirai	1996 WC_{3}	Yuzo Hirai, a professor at the Institute of Information Sciences and Electronics.	JPL · 10609
10611 Yanjici	1997 BB_{1}	Yan Jici (1901–1996)	JPL · 10611
10612 Houffalize	1997 JR_{17}	Houffalize, Belgium, on the Ourthe River	JPL · 10612
10613 Kushinadahime	1997 RO_{3}	Kushinadahime, the mythical empress of the god Susanoo-no-mikoto, was offered as a sacrifice to the giant snake Yamata-no-orochi but was saved by the god Susanoo.	JPL · 10613
10616 Inouetakeshi	1997 UW_{8}	Takeshi Inoue (born 1969) is the astronomy curator of Akashi Municipal Planetarium.	JPL · 10616
10617 Takumi	1997 UK_{24}	Amateur astronomer Takumi Takahata (born 1941) has created many computer programs that are used for astronomical calculations.	JPL · 10617
10619 Ninigi	1997 WO_{13}	According to the Japanese myth, the god Ninigi-no-mikoto is a grandson of the goddess Amaterasu. By the order of Amaterasu he descended from the heaven Takamagahara to the peak Takachiho to dominate the land	JPL · 10619
10626 Zajíc	1998 AP_{8}	Jan Zajíc (born 1910), founder and director of the observatory in Vlašim.	JPL · 10626
10627 Ookuninushi	1998 BW_{2}	The mythical Japanese god Ookuninushi-no-mikoto created the land, together with the god Sukunabikona-no-mikoto. The name means "king of great land" and is frequently referenced in literature and folklore. A well-known story is that he helped a white rabbit skinned by a shark as retribution for trickery	JPL · 10627
10628 Feuerbacher	1998 BD_{5}	Berndt Feuerbacher (born 1940), a German physicist, was for two decades head of the Institute of Space Simulation at the German Aerospace Center in Cologne.	JPL · 10628
10629 Krishnamani	1998 BK_{11}	Preeti Sai Krishnamani (b. 2001) was a finalist in the 2019 Regeneron Science Talent Search, a science competition for high school seniors, for her plant sciences project. She attended the Charter School of Wilmington, Wilmington, Delaware	IAU · 10629
10631 Koppes	1998 BM_{15}	Michele Koppes, Canadian professor of geography at the University of British Columbia.	IAU · 10631
10633 Akimasa	1998 DP_{1}	Akimasa Nakamura (born 1961) is a Japanese observer of minor planets and comets.	JPL · 10633
10634 Pepibican	1998 GM_{1}	Josef "Pepi" Bican (1913–2001), a Czech footballer who represented Austria in 19 and Czechoslovakia in 14 international matches and scored more than 5000 goals in his career. He is considered one of the best center-forward of the century by the International Federation of Soccer Historians and Statisticians. After retirement, Bican developed an interest in astronomy.	JPL · 10634
10635 Chiragkumar	1998 QH_{8}	Chirag Kumar (b. 2001) was a finalist in the 2019 Regeneron Science Talent Search, a science competition for high school seniors, for his earth and planetary project. He attended the Horace Greeley High School, Chappaqua, New York.	IAU · 10635
10637 Heimlich	1998 QP_{104}	Henry J. Heimlich is an American surgeon who in the early 1970s devised the "Heimlich maneuver", a potentially life-saving procedure for propelling food or other foreign objects up and out of the throat	JPL · 10637
10638 McGlothlin	1998 SV_{54}	Gerald R. McGlothlin (born 1952) was responsible for refurbishing much of the LONEOS dome, turning a photographic darkroom into a modern control room and computer room.	JPL · 10638
10639 Gleason	1998 VV_{41}	Arianna Gleason (born 1980) is a student observer with the Spacewatch Project.	JPL · 10639
10640 Varunkumar	1998 WU_{19}	Varun Kumar (b. 2001) was a finalist in the 2019 Regeneron Science Talent Search, a science competition for high school seniors, for his medicine and health project. He attended the Bergen County Academies, Hackensack, New Jersey.	IAU · 10640
10642 Charmaine	1999 BF_{8}	Charmaine Wilkerson (born 1962), wife of the first discoverer, Andrea Boattini, is an American-born writer and broadcaster. She has produced numerous reports on astronomical phenomena and missions.	JPL · 10642
10645 Brač	1999 ES_{4}	Brač island, Croatia, home of the Pustinja Blaca Observatory ("Blaca Desert" Observatory)	JPL · 10645
10646 Machielalberts	2077 P-L	Machiel Alberts (1909–) was the first astronomer in The Netherlands to succeed, with a home-built camera, to capture a meteor on film. He was actively engaged in meteor observations, as well as in building appliances and instruments for amateur astronomers to enable meteor photography and other types of meteor observation.	MPC · 10646
10647 Meesters	3074 P-L	P. G. Meesters (1887–1964) was a Dutch amateur astronomer.	JPL · 10647
10648 Plancius	4089 P-L	Petrus Plancius (1552–1622) was a Dutch theologian, astronomer, navigator and appointed cartographer to the new Dutch East India Company. Plancius depicted the 12 new southern constellations on a globe he constructed in 1598.	JPL · 10648
10649 VOC	4098 P-L	Verenigde Oostindische Compagnie, Dutch for Dutch East India Company †	MPC · 10649
10650 Houtman	4110 P-L	Frederick de Houtman, Dutch navigator who travelled to the East Indies in 1595 as assistant to Pieter Dirkszoon Keyser †	MPC · 10650
10651 van Linschoten	4522 P-L	Jan Huyghen van Linschoten, Dutch cartographer and spy for the Dutch East India Company †	MPC · 10651
10652 Blaeu	4599 P-L	Willem Janszoon Blaeu, Dutch cartographer and hydrographer for the Dutch East India Company †	MPC · 10652
10653 Witsen	6030 P-L	Nicolaas Witsen, Dutch mayor of Amsterdam and member of the board of the Dutch East India Company †	MPC · 10653
10654 Bontekoe	6673 P-L	Willem Ysbrandtszoon Bontekoe	MPC · 10654
10655 Pietkeyser	9535 P-L	Pieter Dirkszoon Keyser, Dutch navigator who travelled to the East Indies in 1595 with Frederik de Houtman as his assistant †	MPC · 10655
10656 Albrecht	2213 T-1	Carl Theodor Albrecht (1843–1915), German astronomer and geodesist, first director of the International Latitude Service.	JPL · 10656
10657 Wanach	2251 T-1	Bernhard Karl Wanach (1867–1928), a Latvian-born astronomer and geodesist.	JPL · 10657
10658 Gretadevries	2281 T-1	Greta de Vries (1967–2006) was the assistant to the director of the Kapteyn Astronomical Institute in Groningen.	JPL · 10658
10659 Sauerland	3266 T-1	The Sauerland, a German rural region, has fairly high mountains, such as Kahler Asten at 840 m, and is partly a nature reserve. It lies just east of the German industrial Rhine-Ruhr region. The area is frequented by hikers during summer and by skiers and tobogganers during winter.	JPL · 10659
10660 Felixhormuth	4348 T-1	Felix Hormuth (born 1975), German astronomer	JPL · 10660
10661 Teutoburgerwald	1211 T-2	The Teutoburg Forest of Germany, where Varus was defeated by Arminius, chief of the Cherusci, a Teutonic tribe.	JPL · 10661
10662 Peterwisse	3201 T-2	Peter Wisse, Dutch curator of the "Museon", the Dutch Center for educational exhibitions	JPL · 10662
10663 Schwarzwald	4283 T-2	The Black Forest (Schwarzwald) in Germany. It lies east of the Rhine river and extends from Basel as far as the city of Baden-Baden. Up to the timber line at about 1200 m, its vegetation consists mainly of fir and spruce.	JPL · 10663
10664 Phemios	5187 T-2	Phemios, a character in The Oddysey	JPL · 10664
10665 Ortigão	3019 T-3	Catarina Ortigão (born 1974) is a Portuguese-born scientist working in the field of medical physics.	JPL · 10665
10666 Feldberg	4171 T-3	The Feldberg is the highest mountain (1490 m) of the Schwarzwald.	JPL · 10666
10667 van Marxveldt	1975 UA	Cissy van Marxveldt (Setske de Haan), 19th–20th-century Dutch writer, author of the humorous Joop ter Heul novels for teenage girls; Anne Frank addressed her diary letters to an imaginary friend based on one of van Marxveldt's characters	JPL · 10667
10668 Plansos	1976 UB_{1}	The discoverer's grandchildren: Pandora Mae Honiara (born 2000), Noël Richard (born 2000), Alexander Richard (born 2001), Orlando Harry Tengis (born 2002), Samuel Philip (born 2004), Salomé Olivia Lindsay (born 2005), Lidia Philipa (born 2007). The name is an anagram of the first name initials.	JPL · 10668
10669 Herfordia	1977 FN	Herford, a town in what is sometimes called "Eastern Westfalia".	JPL · 10669
10670 Seminozhenko	1977 PP_{1}	Ukrainian physicist Vladimir Petrovich Seminozhenko (born 1950) is known for his research on the kinetics of excitation in superconductors and semiconductors and on high-temperature superconductivity	JPL · 10670
10671 Mazurova	1977 RR_{6}	Ekaterina Yakovlevna Mazurova (1900–1995) was a Russian actress who worked in Moscow theaters and played many roles in films.	JPL · 10671
10672 Kostyukova	1978 QE	Tatiana Andreevna Kostyukova (born 1957) is a botanist and cultivator of flowers in Kyiv. Her collection of flowers won a diploma at the 2001 Moscow Autumn Flower Show	JPL · 10672
10673 Berezhnoy	1978 VU_{5}	Alexey A. Berezhnoy (born 1972) is a Russian chemist and astronomer at Moscow State University studying chemical processes during the interaction of meteoroids with planetary atmospheres and surfaces, including the lunar exosphere.	JPL · 10673
10674 de Elía	1978 VT_{10}	Gonzalo Carlos de Elía (born 1977) is an Argentine astronomer at La Plata National University who studies the formation and evolution of planetary systems.	JPL · 10674
10675 Kharlamov	1978 VE_{15}	Valerij Borisovich Kharlamov (1948–1981), Russian ice hockey player.	JPL · 10675
10676 Jamesmcdanell	1979 MD_{2}	James P. McDanell (born 1937) spent nearly three decades with the Jet Propulsion Laboratory before retiring in 1999. He was the Voyager Navigation Team Chief during the successful encounters with Saturn and its satellites. He subsequently became manager of the Navigation Systems Section	JPL · 10676
10677 Colucci	1979 MN_{3}	Adrian Rodriguez Colucci (born 1978) is an astronomer at the Valongo Observatory of Rio de Janeiro, Brazil. He is a specialist in tidal evolution of planets and small bodies.	JPL · 10677
10678 Alilagoa	1979 MG_{6}	Victor Alí-Lagoa (born 1983) is a Spanish astronomer whose PhD research at the Instituto de Astrofísica de Canarias focused on the thermal properties of small bodies.	JPL · 10678
10679 Chankaochang	1979 MH_{6}	Chan-Kao "Rex" Chang (born 1976) is a researcher at the National Central University of Taiwan whose work includes searching for fast-rotating asteroids in Palomar Transient Factory survey data and rotation rate distribution studies.	JPL · 10679
10680 Ermakov	1979 ME_{8}	Anton Ermakov (born 1988) is a postdoctoral researcher at the California Institute of Technology who studies the gravity and interior structures of Vesta and Ceres using Dawn spacecraft data.	JPL · 10680
10681 Khture	1979 TH_{2}	The Kharkiv Technical University of Radioelectronics, founded in 1930.	JPL · 10681
10682 Kutryk	1980 KK	Joshua Kutryk (b. 1982), a Canadian mechanical engineer	IAU · 10682
10683 Carter	1980 LY	Carter Worth Roberts (born 1946), president of the Eastbay Astronomical Society. He collaborated on a safe solar-eclipse-viewing booklet and helped restore "Rachel", the 0.5-m Brashear refractor for the Chabot Space and Science Center	JPL · 10683
10684 Babkina	1980 RV_{2}	Nadezhda Georgievna Babkina (born 1950)	JPL · 10684
10685 Kharkivuniver	1980 VO	V. N. Karazin Kharkiv National University (В. Н. Каразіна Харківський Національний Університет) of Ukraine	MPC · 10685
10686 Kaluna	1980 VX_{2}	Heather Kaluna (born 1984) is a researcher at the University of Hawaii studying the evolution of water in carbonaceous asteroids as well as space weathering processes.	JPL · 10686
10688 Haghighipour	1981 DK	Nader Haghighipour (born 1967) is a professor at the University of Hawaii specializing in solar system dynamics as well as extrasolar planets.	JPL · 10688
10689 Pinillaalonso	1981 DZ_{1}	Noemi Pinilla-Alonso (born 1971) is a planetary scientist at the Florida Space Institute who specializes in the study of surface compositions of minor solar system bodies using observational techniques and modeling.	JPL · 10689
10690 Massera	1981 DO_{3}	José Luis Massera (1915–2002), a Uruguayan mathematician who studied the stability of differential equations. Massera's Lemma solves the equilibrium stability problem in nonlinear differential equations in terms of the Lyapunov function.	JPL · 10690
10691 Sans	1981 EJ_{19}	Juan Diego Sans (1922–2005) was a Uruguayan professor and public communicator of astronomy at the Universidad de la Republica. He was co-founder of the Asociación de Aficionados a la Astronomía and president of the Sociedad Uruguaya de Astronomía.	JPL · 10691
10692 Opeil	1981 EK_{19}	Cyril P. Opeil SJ (born 1960) is a professor at Boston College studying the thermal properties of meteorites to improve understanding of orbital and rotational changes caused by the re-radiation of solar flux.	JPL · 10692
10693 Zangari	1981 ES_{20}	Amanda M. Zangari (born 1986) is a postdoctoral researcher at Southwest Research Institute (Boulder, Colorado) whose studies include photometry and stellar occultations of the Pluto system and other Kuiper belt objects.	JPL · 10693
10694 Lacerda	1981 EH_{21}	Pedro Lacerda (born 1975) is a lecturer at Queen's University Belfast whose work includes analyzing rotational lightcurves to infer physical properties of trans-Neptunian objects and other small solar system bodies.	JPL · 10694
10695 Yasunorifujiwara	1981 ER_{21}	Yasunori Fujiwara (born 1957) is known for his study of the Leonid meteor stream.	JPL · 10695
10696 Giuliattiwinter	1981 EO_{24}	Silvia Maria Giuliatti Winter (born 1965) is a Brazilian astronomer at the São Paulo State University working on ring dynamics and the dynamics of the Pluto system.	JPL · 10696
10697 Othonwinter	1981 EO_{40}	Othon Cabo Winter (born 1963) is a Brazilian astronomer at the São Paulo State University researching orbital dynamics with application to the stability of multiple asteroid systems.	JPL · 10697
10698 Singer	1981 EJ_{43}	Kelsi N. Singer (born 1984) is a postdoctoral researcher at Southwest Research Institute (Boulder, Colorado) studying outer solar system icy satellites and the Kuiper belt population through the crater size distribution revealed by the New Horizons mission to the Pluto system.	JPL · 10698
10699 Calabrese	1981 ES_{43}	Pietro Calabrese (1944–2010) was editor of the Italian newspapers Il Messaggero and La Gazzetta dello Sport. He was interested in communicating with extraterrestrial intelligence.	JPL · 10699
10700 Juanangelviera	1981 ET_{47}	Juan Angel Viera (1925–2012) was an amateur astronomer, high-school teacher in astronomy and a communicator in Uruguay. He was Honorary President and co-founder of the Asociación de Aficionados a la Astronomía.	JPL · 10700

== 10701–10800 ==
back to top

Named minor planet	Provisional	This minor planet was named for...	Ref · Catalog
10701 Marilynsimons	1981 PF	Marilyn Hawrys Simons (born 1951) is an American economist and philanthropist.	JPL · 10701
10702 Arizorcas	1981 QD	The Arizona Orchestra Association represents Arizona's forty-one orchestras.	JPL · 10702
10703 Saint-Jacques	1981 QU_{3}	David Saint-Jacques (b. 1970), a Canadian physician and astronaut.	IAU · 10703
10704 Sidey	1981 RQ_{1}	Jennifer (Jenni) Anne MacKinnon Sidey-Gibbons (b. 1988) studied at McGill University and earned her PhD from the University of Cambridge, where she continued on as assistant professor and lecturer in engineering. Her research related to combustion and the complex processes involved. In 2017, she was selected as an astronaut by the Canadian Space Agency.	IAU · 10704
10707 Prunariu	1981 UV_{23}	Dumitru Prunariu (born 1952) became the first Romanian cosmonaut flying in 1981 aboard Soyuz 40 to the Salyut 6 space laboratory. He is one of the proposal initiators for International Asteroid Day (June 30) declared by the UN General Assembly.	JPL · 10707
10708 Richardspalding	1981 UE_{26}	Richard Spalding (born 1935) is an engineer at Sandia National Laboratories whose satellite projects include the detection of Gamma Ray Bursts and transient atmospheric phenomena generated by lightning and meteors.	JPL · 10708
10709 Ottofranz	1982 BE_{1}	Otto G. Franz (born 1931), a Lowell Observatory astronomer.	JPL · 10709
10711 Pskov	1982 TT_{2}	Pskov, a Russian city on the Velikaya River near the Estonian border	JPL · 10711
10712 Malashchuk	1982 UE_{6}	Valentina Mikhailovna Malashchuk (born 1947), accountant general of the Crimean Astrophysical Observatory	JPL · 10712
10713 Limorenko	1982 UZ_{9}	Leonid Pavlovich Limorenko (born 1951), assistant director of the Crimean Astrophysical Observatory.	JPL · 10713
10715 Nagler	1983 RL_{4}	Al Nagler (1935–2025), an optical designer involved in NASA's Gemini and Apollo missions	JPL · 10715
10716 Olivermorton	1983 WQ	Oliver Morton (born 1965).	JPL · 10716
10717 Dickwalker	1983 XC	Richard Walker (a.k.a. Dick Walker; 1938–2005), American astronomer at USNO and discoverer of Epimetheus	JPL · 10717
10718 Samusʹ	1985 QM_{5}	Nikolaj Nikolaevich Samusʹ (born 1949) is a scientist in stellar astrophysics at the Institute of Astronomy of the Russian Academy of Sciences and Moscow University.	JPL · 10718
10719 Andamar	1985 TW	Anne Marren (born 1944) and David Marren (born 1953), friends of American discoverer Edward L. G. Bowell	JPL · 10719
10720 Danzl	1986 GY	Nichole M. Danzl, American amateur astronomer, former Spacewatch Observer and discoverer of minor planets	JPL · 10720
10721 Tuterov	1986 QO_{4}	Vladimir Lukich Tuterov (born 1960).	JPL · 10721
10722 Monari	1986 TB	Luisa Monari (born 1961), wife of Italian co-discoverer Ermes Colombini	JPL · 10722
10723 Tobiashinse	1986 TH	Tobias Cornelius Hinse (b. 1975), a German astronomer.	IAU · 10723
10724 Carolraymond	1986 VR_{5}	Carol A. Raymond (born 1960), a scientist at the Jet Propulsion Laboratory	JPL · 10724
10725 Sukunabikona	1986 WB	Sukunabikona, the Japanese god of a naughty character	JPL · 10725
10726 Elodie	1987 BS_{2}	Élodie Bouteille (born 1990), a French student at the Lycée Diderot	JPL · 10726
10727 Akitsushima	1987 DN	Jinmu (Akitsushima), the first emperor of Japan according to legend	JPL · 10727
10728 Vladimirfock	1987 RT_{5}	Vladimir Fock (1898–1974), a Russian physicist	JPL · 10728
10729 Tsvetkova	1987 RU_{5}	Valentina Petrovna Tsvetkova (1917–2007), a Russian artist	JPL · 10729
10730 White	1987 SU	Nathaniel Miller White (born 1941), American astronomer at Lowell Observatory	JPL · 10730
10731 Dollyparton	1988 BL_{3}	Dolly Rebecca Parton (1946–2026) was a musician, entrepreneur, and philanthropist. She has composed thousands of songs, including megahits "Jolene", "I Will Always Love You” and "9 to 5".	IAU · 10731
10733 Georgesand	1988 CP_{1}	George Sand (1804–1876), French writer.	JPL · 10733
10734 Wieck	1988 CT_{4}	Clara Josephine Wieck (1819–1896).	JPL · 10734
10735 Seine	1988 CF_{6}	The Seine, a major river in France, which passes the cities of Troyes, Paris and Rouen, before ending at the English Channel near Le Havre	JPL · 10735
10736 Marybrück	1988 DD_{3}	Mary Brück (1925–2011), an Irish astronomer.	JPL · 10736
10737 Brück	1988 DZ_{4}	Hermann Brück (1905–2000), a German-born astronomer in the UK	JPL · 10737
10738 Marcoaldo	1988 FW_{2}	Marco Aldo Ferreri (born 1981), son of Italian discoverer Walter Ferreri	JPL · 10738
10739 Lowman	1988 JB_{1}	Margaret D. Lowman (born 1953).	JPL · 10739
10740 Fallersleben	1988 RX_{2}	August Heinrich Hoffmann von Fallersleben (1798–1874), a German poet and philologist	JPL · 10740
10741 Valeriocarruba	1988 SF_{3}	Valerio Carruba (born 1970) is an astronomer at the São Paulo State University in Brazil whose research includes the dynamics and identification of asteroid families and the effect of non-linear secular resonances in the asteroid belt.	JPL · 10741
10744 Tsuruta	1988 XO	Masatoshi Tsuruta (born 1938), president of the Saga Astronomical Society since 1998.	JPL · 10744
10745 Arnstadt	1989 AK_{6}	Arnstadt, a town in Thuringia with a 1300-year history.	JPL · 10745
10746 Mühlhausen	1989 CE_{6}	Mühlhausen	JPL · 10746
10747 Köthen	1989 CW_{7}	Köthen, a German town in Saxony-Anhalt	JPL · 10747
10749 Musäus	1989 GH_{8}	Johann Karl August Musäus (1735–1787), a private tutor at the court of Weimar.	JPL · 10749
10753 van de Velde	1989 WU_{4}	Henry van de Velde (1863–1957), a Belgian painter, architect and interior designer	JPL · 10753
10758 Aldoushuxley	1990 SM_{7}	Aldous Leonard Huxley (1894–1963), an English writer	JPL · 10758
10760 Ozeki	1990 TJ_{3}	Takaaki Ozeki (born 1952), previously a teacher of science, is now astronomy curator of the Hoshinoko Yakata Observatory.	JPL · 10760
10761 Lyubimets	1990 TB_{4}	Grigorij (born 2000), grandson of the Crimean astronomer Lyudmila Karachkina.	JPL · 10761
10762 von Laue	1990 TC_{4}	Max von Laue (1879–1960), student of Planck, discovered the diffraction of x-rays in crystals, thereby permitting their structural analysis. For this he received the 1914 Nobel Prize in physics.	JPL · 10762
10763 Hlawka	1990 TH_{13}	Edmund Hlawka (1916–2009), Austrian mathematician.	JPL · 10763
10764 Rübezahl	1990 TK_{13}	Rübezahl, a fairy tale figure in German, Polish, and Czech folklore	JPL · 10764
10767 Toyomasu	1990 UF_{1}	Shinji Toyomasu (born 1967) is a research fellow of the Misato Observatory.	JPL · 10767
10768 Sarutahiko	1990 UZ_{1}	Sarutahiko Ōkami, a Japanese Shinto deity and guardian of Earth	JPL · 10768
10769 Minas Gerais	1990 UJ_{5}	Minas Gerais, a Brazilian state	JPL · 10769
10770 Belo Horizonte	1990 VU_{5}	Belo Horizonte, capital city of the Brazilian state of Minas Gerais	JPL · 10770
10771 Ouro Prêto	1990 VK_{6}	Ouro Preto, ancient capital of the Brazilian state of Minas Gerais	JPL · 10771
10773 Jamespaton	1991 AK_{2}	James Paton (1903–1973), a Scottish meteorologist.	JPL · 10773
10774 Eisenach	1991 AS_{2}	Eisenach a town in Thuringia, Germany .	JPL · 10774
10775 Leipzig	1991 AV_{2}	Leipzig, largest city of Saxony, Germany	JPL · 10775
10776 Musashitomiyo	1991 CP_{1}	Musashitomiyo ("Musashi ninespine stickleback"; Pungitius nakamurai), a rare freshwater fish, seen only in Kumagaya, Saitama, Japan.	JPL · 10776
10778 Marcks	1991 GN_{10}	Gerhard Marcks (1889–1981), sculptor and graphic artist.	JPL · 10778
10780 Apollinaire	1991 PB_{2}	Guillaume Apollinaire (1880–1918), a French poet	JPL · 10780
10781 Ritter	1991 PV_{31}	Johann Wilhelm Ritter (1776–1810), German chemist, physicist and philosopher	JPL · 10781
10782 Hittmair	1991 RH_{4}	Otto Hittmair (born 1924), an Austrian theoretical physicist.	JPL · 10782
10784 Noailles	1991 RQ_{11}	Anna de Noailles (1876–1933), the daughter of a Romanian prince and granddaughter of a Turkish pasha.	JPL · 10784
10785 Dejaiffe	1991 RD_{12}	René Dejaiffe (born 1940), a Belgian astronomer	JPL · 10785
10786 Robertmayer	1991 TC_{3}	Julius Robert Mayer (1814–1878), a German doctor and naturalist.	JPL · 10786
10787 Ottoburkard	1991 TL_{3}	Otto M. Burkard (born 1908), an Austrian professor emeritus of meteorology and geophysics of the University of Graz	JPL · 10787
10789 Mikeread	1991 VL_{10}	Michael T. Read (born 1978) is a student working as an observer and engineer at Spacewatch. He discovered comets 238P/Read and 344P/Read.	JPL · 10789
10791 Uson	1992 CS	Uson Morishita (1890–1965), born in Sagawa, Kochi prefecture.	JPL · 10791
10792 Ecuador	1992 CQ_{2}	Ecuador, the South American country.	JPL · 10792
10793 Quito	1992 CU_{2}	Quito, the capital city of Ecuador.	JPL · 10793
10794 Vänge	1992 DW_{5}	Vänge, a settlement on the Swedish island of Gotland.	JPL · 10794
10795 Babben	1992 EB_{5}	Babben Larsson (born 1956), a Swedish actress, singer and comedian.	JPL · 10795
10796 Sollerman	1992 EB_{8}	Jesper Sollerman (born 1968), a Swedish astronomer at Stockholm University, who researches supernovae, pulsars, and gamma-ray bursts.	JPL · 10796
10797 Guatemala	1992 GO_{4}	Guatemala, the Central American country.	JPL · 10797
10799 Yucatán	1992 OY_{2}	The Mexican Yucatán Peninsula.	JPL · 10799

== 10801–10900 ==
back to top

Named minor planet	Provisional	This minor planet was named for...	Ref · Catalog
10801 Lüneburg	1992 SK_{26}	Lüneburg, one of the richest Hanse towns, more than 1000 years old.	JPL · 10801
10802 Masamifuruya	1992 UL_{6}	Masami Furuya (born 1973), a research fellow at the Kawabe Observatory of Kawabe Cosmic Park.	JPL · 10802
10803 Caléyo	1992 UK_{9}	Jose M. Caréyo (born 1938), a jazz composer living in Havana.	JPL · 10803
10804 Amenouzume	1992 WN_{3}	Amenouzume is the mythical Japanese goddess who managed to free the goddess Amaterasu by dancing in front of the rock door when she shut herself up in the cave Ama-no-iwayado. After that Amenouzume descended from heaven, following the god Ninigi-no-mikoto.	JPL · 10804
10805 Iwano	1992 WG_{5}	Hisaka Iwano (born 1957), an engineer and amateur astronomer in Japan	JPL · 10805
10806 Mexico	1993 FA_{2}	Mexico, a country in the southern part of North America	JPL · 10806
10807 Uggarde	1993 FT_{4}	Uggarde rojr, cairn on Gotland island, Sweden	MPC · 10807
10808 Digerrojr	1993 FT_{5}	Digerrojr, cairn on Gotland island, Sweden	MPC · 10808
10809 Majsterrojr	1993 FS_{14}	Majsterrojr, cairn on Gotland island, Sweden	MPC · 10809
10810 Lejsturojr	1993 FL_{15}	Lejstu rojr, cairn on Gotland island, Sweden	MPC · 10810
10811 Lau	1993 FM_{19}	Lau, Gotland, socken on southern Gotland island, Sweden	JPL · 10811
10812 Grötlingbo	1993 FZ_{25}	Grötlingbo, socken on Gotland island, Sweden	JPL · 10812
10813 Mästerby	1993 FE_{31}	Mästerby, socken on Gotland island, Sweden	JPL · 10813
10814 Gnisvärd	1993 FW_{31}	Gnisvärd is a small fishing village on Gotland.	JPL · 10814
10815 Östergarn	1993 FU_{32}	Östergarn	JPL · 10815
10819 Mahakala	1993 HG	Mahakala, or "Great Time", is one of the destructive aspects of Shiva in Vedic Hinduism †	MPC · 10819
10820 Offenbach	1993 QN_{4}	Jacques Offenbach (1819–1880), a German-French composer.	JPL · 10820
10821 Kimuratakeshi	1993 SZ	Takeshi Kimura (born 1943).	JPL · 10821
10822 Yasunori	1993 SK_{1}	Yasunori Harada (born 1971), a research engineer and amateur astronomer in Japan.	JPL · 10822
10823 Sakaguchi	1993 SM_{1}	Naoto Sakaguchi (born 1962), an amateur astronomer.	JPL · 10823
10825 Augusthermann	1993 SF_{4}	August Hermann Francke (1663–1727), a German theologian and pedagogue.	JPL · 10825
10827 Doikazunori	1993 TC_{3}	azunori Doi (born 1952), a Japanese architect and amateur astronomer.	JPL · 10827
10828 Tomjones	1993 TE_{5}	Thomas D. Jones (born 1955), a planetary scientist.	JPL · 10828
10829 Matsuobasho	1993 UU	Matsuo Basho (1644–1694).	JPL · 10829
10830 Desforges	1993 UT_{6}	Jacques Desforges^{(fr)} (1723–1791), a French priest at Étampes	JPL · 10830
10831 Takamagahara	1993 VM_{2}	Takamagahara was the heaven that appears in Japanese ancient myth. The place was ruled by the goddess Amaterasu.	JPL · 10831
10832 Hazamashigetomi	1993 VN_{2}	Hazama Shigetomi (1756–1816), an astronomer in the Japanese Edo period who studied positional astronomy.	JPL · 10832
10834 Zembsch-Schreve	1993 VU_{5}	Guido Zembsch-Schreve (born 1916), a Dutch secret agent.	JPL · 10834
10835 Fröbel	1993 VB_{8}	Friedrich Fröbel (1782–1852), a Thuringian pedagogue. In 1839 he founded the first nursery school, which he named Kindergarten.	JPL · 10835
10837 Yuyakekoyake	1994 EJ_{1}	Yuyakekoyake, popular Japanese nursery rhyme	JPL · 10837
10838 Lebon	1994 EH_{7}	Gustave Le Bon (1841–1931), a French social psychologist.	JPL · 10838
10839 Hufeland	1994 GY_{9}	Christoph Wilhelm Hufeland, German physician.	JPL · 10839
10841 Ericforbes	1994 PP_{1}	Eric Gray Forbes (1933–1984), a professor and director of the History of Medicine and Science Unit at Edinburgh University.	JPL · 10841
10847 Koch	1995 AV_{4}	Heinrich Hermann Robert Koch, German physician and Nobelist.	JPL · 10847
10849 Onigiri	1995 BO_{1}	Onigiri is a palm-sized portable food that has been eaten in Japan for more than 500 years.	IAU · 10849
10850 Denso	1995 BU_{4}	Named for Denso Corporation, for which the discoverer worked for eight years as an electrical engineer.	JPL · 10850
10853 Aimoto	1995 CW	Minoru Aimoto (born 1965), a senior researcher at Saji Observatory, is in charge of astronomical exhibitions and astronomical lectures for visitors to the observatory.	JPL · 10853
10856 Bechstein	1995 EG_{8}	Carl Bechstein (1826–1900), born in the Thuringian town of Gotha, founded a piano factory in Berlin in 1853.	JPL · 10856
10857 Blüthner	1995 EZ_{8}	Julius Blüthner (1824–1910) founded a piano factory in Leipzig in 1853.	JPL · 10857
10861 Ciske	1995 MG_{1}	Ciske Staring was a courier in Amsterdam for the Dutch resistance during World War II.	MPC · 10861
10863 Oye	1995 QJ_{3}	Jacob and Martha Oye are the grandparents of Paul Kervin, AMOS technical director.	JPL · 10863
10864 Yamagatashi	1995 QS_{3}	The city of Yamagata, in the center of Yamagata prefecture.	JPL · 10864
10865 Thelmaruby	1995 SO_{33}	Thelma Ruby is a British actress.	JPL · 10865
10866 Peru	1996 NB_{4}	Peru, on the west coast of South America.	JPL · 10866
10867 Lima	1996 NX_{4}	Lima, Peru.	JPL · 10867
10870 Gwendolen	1996 SY_{4}	Mary Gwendolen Ellery Read Aikman, the discoverer's mother †	MPC · 10870
10872 Vaculík	1996 TJ_{9}	Ludvík Vaculík, Czech writer and journalist †	MPC · 10872
10874 Locatelli	1996 TN_{19}	Pietro Antonio Locatelli, Italian violinist and composer †	MPC · 10874
10875 Veracini	1996 TG_{28}	Francesco Maria Veracini, Italian violinist and composer †	MPC · 10875
10877 Jiangnan Tianchi	1996 UR	Jiang Nan Tian Chi, an observation station in Eastern China.	JPL · 10877
10878 Moriyama	1996 VV	Moriyama, a city on east side of Lake Biwa, the largest lake in Japan, in Shiga Prefecture.	JPL · 10878
10880 Kaguya	1996 VN_{4}	SELENE, a lunar explorer developed by the Japan Aerospace Exploration Agency (JAXA), nicknamed Kaguya after a Japanese folktale character	JPL · 10880
10882 Shinonaga	1996 VG_{5}	Kouji Shinonaga (born 1952), the director of Kamagari Observatory since 1991.	JPL · 10882
10884 Tsuboimasaki	1996 VD_{9}	Masaki Tsuboi (born 1954), the president of the Hiroshima Astronomical Society and a leader of the amateur astronomy community in western Japan.	JPL · 10884
10885 Horimasato	1996 VE_{9}	Masato Hori (born 1957), is a specialist in civil engineering and a member of the Hiroshima Astronomical Society.	JPL · 10885
10886 Mitsuroohba	1996 VR_{30}	Mitsuro Ohba, Japanese polar adventurer.	JPL · 10886
10888 Yamatano-orochi	1996 XT_{30}	Yamatano-orochi is a giant snake appearing in Japanese ancient mythology. The snake had eight heads and eight tails and was long enough to cover eight valleys and eight peaks. It was defeated by the god Susanoo-no-mikoto.	JPL · 10888
10891 Fink	1997 QR_{3}	Uwe Fink (born 1939)	JPL · 10891
10892 Gianna	1997 SX_{2}	Gianna Petean (born 1958).	IAU · 10892
10894 Nakai	1997 SE_{30}	R. Carlos Nakai, musician and cultural anthropologist of Navajo-Ute descent †	MPC · 10894
10895 Aynrand	1997 TC_{18}	Ayn Rand (1905–1982), Russian-born philosopher and writer, emigrated to the United States at age 21. She was the author of several novels and books, including The Fountainhead (1943) and Atlas Shrugged (1957)	JPL · 10895
10900 Folkner	1997 WF_{21}	William Folkner (born 1956), a principal scientist at the Jet Propulsion Laboratory, is a recognized authority on the planetary ephemerides.	JPL · 10900

== 10901–11000 ==
back to top

Named minor planet	Provisional	This minor planet was named for...	Ref · Catalog
10902 Hebeishida	1997 WB_{22}	Hebei Normal University (Hebeishida), a key provincial university in Hebei Province, China.	IAU · 10902
10907 Savalle	1997 XG_{5}	Renaud Savalle (born 1971), an astronomical software programmer, wrote the CCD acquisition system used by the Asteroid Survey at Caussols that allowed this minor planet to be discovered.	JPL · 10907
10908 Kallestroetzel	1997 XH_{9}	Karl-Heinz Stroetzel (born 1935)	JPL · 10908
10911 Ziqiangbuxi	1997 YC_{1}	Originated from I Ching (the Book of Changes), "Zi Qiang Bu Xi" are the Chinese characters for "Unremittingly practicing self-improvement".	JPL · 10911
10914 Tucker	1997 YQ_{14}	Roy Tucker (born 1951), an instrumentalist at Kitt Peak National Observatory, is the owner and chief observer of southern Arizona's Goodricke-Pigott Observatory.	JPL · 10914
10916 Okina-Ouna	1997 YB_{17}	Okina and Ouna are the two small lunar explorers developed by the Japan Aerospace Exploration Agency. They were separated from the main orbiter of the lunar explorer "KAGUYA (SELENE)" in Oct. 2007. Okina and Ouna are also the foster parents of Kaguya in the old Japanese story Kaguya-hime	JPL · 10916
10918 Kodaly	1998 AS_{1}	Zoltán Kodály (1882–1967), Hungarian composer	MPC · 10918
10919 Pepíkzicha	1998 AQ_{8}	Josef Zicha (1939-2024) was the head engineer for the 2m telescope at Ondřejov.	JPL · 10919
10921 Romanozen	1998 BC_{2}	Romano Zen (born 1946), known for his optical instruments.	JPL · 10921
10922 Thomaslam	1998 BG_{2}	Thomas Lam (b. 2001) was a finalist in the 2019 Regeneron Science Talent Search, a science competition for high school seniors, for his mathematics project. He attended the Syosset High School, Syosset, New York.	IAU · 10922
10923 Gabrielleliu	1998 BU_{12}	Gabrielle Kaili-May Liu (born 2001) was awarded first place in the 2019 Intel International Science and Engineering Fair (ISEF) for her systems software project. She was awarded third place in the 2017 Siemens Competition for her math project and was a finalist in the 2019 Regeneron Science Talent Search (STS), a science competition for high school seniors, for her computer science project. She was named a 2018 RSI Scholar. She attended the Ravenwood High School, Brentwood, Tennessee, USA and the Massachusetts Institute of Technology, Cambridge, Massachusetts, USA.	JPL · 10923
10924 Mariagriffin	1998 BU_{25}	Maria Anna Griffin (born 1962), wife of the discoverer, Ian P. Griffin	JPL · 10924
10925 Ventoux	1998 BK_{30}	Mont Ventoux (1909 m) in the French département of Vaucluse (Provence).	JPL · 10925
10926 Hayeri	1998 BF_{41}	Kiana Hayeri, Iranian-Canadian photographer	IAU · 10926
10927 Vaucluse	1998 BB_{42}	Vaucluse is a French département.	JPL · 10927
10928 Caprara	1998 BW_{43}	Giovanni Caprara (born 1948) is the science and space editor of Il Corriere della Sera.	JPL · 10928
10929 Chenfangyun	1998 CF_{1}	Chen Fangyun (1916–2000).	JPL · 10929
10930 Jinyong	1998 CR_{2}	Jin Yong (pen-name of Louis Cha), Chinese writer	JPL · 10930
10931 Ceccano	1998 DA	Ceccano, where the discovery observations of this minor planet were made.	JPL · 10931
10932 Rebentrost	1998 DL_{1}	David Rebentrost (1614–1703), a vicar, doctor and herbalist in Drebach.	JPL · 10932
10934 Pauldelvaux	1998 DN_{34}	Paul Delvaux (1897–1994) was a Belgian Surrealist painter.	JPL · 10934
10937 Ferris	1998 QW_{54}	William D. Ferris (born 1961), a video producer-director at Northern Arizona University.	JPL · 10937
10938 Lorenzalevy	1998 SW_{60}	Lorenza Levy (born 1976), an observer for LONEOS since mid–1999.	JPL · 10938
10939 Maheshwari	1999 CJ_{19}	Eish Maheshwari (b. 2002) was a finalist in the 2019 Regeneron Science Talent Search, a science competition for high school seniors, for his medicine and health project. He attended the Herricks High School, New Hyde Park, New York.	IAU · 10939
10941 Mamidala	1999 CD_{79}	Sai Preethi Mamidala (b. 2001) was a finalist in the 2019 Regeneron Science Talent Search, a science competition for high school seniors, for her chemistry project. She attended the Garnet Valley High School, Glen Mills, Pennsylvania.	IAU · 10941
10942 Natashamaniar	1999 CN_{83}	Natasha M. Maniar (b. 2001) was a finalist in the 2019 Regeneron Science Talent Search, a science competition for high school seniors, for her computational biology and bioinformatics project. She attended the Harker School, San Jose, California.	IAU · 10942
10943 Brunier	1999 FY_{6}	Serge Brunier (born 1958).	JPL · 10943
10946 Guyidong	1999 HR_{2}	Gu Yidong, an expert in space science and an Academician of the Chinese Academy of Sciences.	IAU · 10946
10947 Kaiserstuhl	2061 P-L	The Kaiserstuhl (570 m) is an old volcanic mountain range between the Schwarzwald and the Rhine river. It has one of the mildest climates in Germany. Since Roman times the slopes of the mountains have been covered with vineyards, producing the well-known wine "Kaiserstühler".	JPL · 10947
10948 Odenwald	2207 P-L	The Odenwald is a mountain range in Germany between the Main and Neckar rivers, east of the Rhine river. Heidelberg is located in the southern part of the Odenwald. Its summits are Königstuhl and Melibokus.	JPL · 10948
10949 Königstuhl	3066 P-L	The Königstuhl, second highest mountain of the Odenwald range of Germany, site of the Landessternwarte Heidelberg-Königstuhl and the Max-Planck-Institut für Astronomie	JPL · 10949
10950 Albertjansen	4049 P-L	Albert Jansen (1940–2004)	JPL · 10950
10951 Spessart	4050 P-L	The Spessart, a small chain of mountains surrounded by the river Main on three sides in Germany. It is part of the mountains east of the Rhine, which extend from Basel in the south to Frankfurt in the north.	JPL · 10951
10952 Vogelsberg	4152 P-L	Vogelsberg Mountains, a volcanic mountain range in German	MPC · 10952
10953 Gerdatschira	4276 P-L	Gerda Tschira (born 1943), German founder and director of the Carl Bosch museum, Heidelberg	JPL · 10953
10954 Spiegel	4545 P-L	Beate Spiegel (born 1960), German head of the office of the Klaus Tschira Foundation	JPL · 10954
10955 Harig	5011 P-L	Ludwig Harig (born 1927) is a German writer.	JPL · 10955
10956 Vosges	5023 P-L	The Vosges (1420 m) mountain range extends west of the Rhine in France, opposite the German Schwarzwald mountains.	JPL · 10956
10957 Alps	6068 P-L	The Alps form a mountain chain stretching from the Mediterranean Sea between southern France and Italy through Switzerland to eastern Austria.	JPL · 10957
10958 Mont Blanc	6188 P-L	Mont Blanc (4800 m), in the French-Italian Alps, is the highest mountain in Europe.	JPL · 10958
10959 Appennino	6579 P-L	The Apennine Mountains is a mountain range that extends for the whole length of Italy, a 1400-km stretch from the Gulf of Genoa to the Strait of Messina.	JPL · 10959
10960 Gran Sasso	6580 P-L	Gran Sasso (2910 m) is the highest mountain of the Apennines, Italy.	MPC · 10960
10961 Buysballot	6809 P-L	C. H. D. Buys Ballot (1817–1890), Dutch meteorologist, described Buys Ballot's law describing the turning of the winds in northern and southern hemispheres. He founded the Astronomical Institute at the University of Utrecht (Sonnenborgh) in 1853 and the Royal Netherlands Meteorological Institute in 1854.	JPL · 10961
10962 Sonnenborgh	9530 P-L	Sonnenborgh Observatory in Utrecht, founded in 1853 by Buys Ballot, specializes in the study of the sun.	JPL · 10962
10963 van der Brugge	2088 T-1	Aad H. van der Brugge, a Dutch amateur astronomer and member of the Royal Netherlands Association for Meteorology and Astronomy	MPC · 10963
10964 Degraaff	3216 T-1	Willem de Graaff (1923–2004), was a Dutch astronomical researcher and lecturer at Utrecht University.	JPL · 10964
10965 van Leverink	3297 T-1	Simon van Leverink (born 1947), member of the Working Group on Meteors of the Royal Netherlands Meteorological and Astronomical Society.	MPC · 10965
10966 van der Hucht	3308 T-1	Karel A. van der Hucht (born 1946), a Dutch astronomer who was appointed Assistant General Secretary of the International Astronomical Union in 2003	JPL · 10966
10967 Billallen	4349 T-1	William H. Allen (born 1939), a New Zealand amateur astronomer and electrical engineer.	JPL · 10967
10968 Sterken	4393 T-1	Christiaan Sterken (born 1946), a Belgian astronomer, Research Director of the Belgian Fund For Scientific Research, and co-founder of the Journal of Astronomical Data	JPL · 10968
10969 Perryman	4827 T-1	Michael Perryman (born 1954), British project scientist and scientific leader of the HIPPARCOS and GAIA astrometry missions of the European Space Agency	JPL · 10969
10970 de Zeeuw	1079 T-2	Tim de Zeeuw (born 1956), a Dutch astronomer at Leiden Observatory and Director General of the European Southern Observatory (ESO) since 2007. He is the husband of Ewine van Dishoeck (see (10971))	JPL · 10970
10971 van Dishoeck	1179 T-2	Ewine van Dishoeck (born 1955), a Dutch astronomer at Leiden Observatory	JPL · 10971
10972 Merbold	1188 T-2	Ulf Merbold (born 1941), a German astronaut and Spacelab module specialists of the U.S. Space Shuttle	JPL · 10972
10973 Thomasreiter	1210 T-2	Thomas Reiter (born 1958), a German astronaut who stayed on both the Russian Mir Space Station and the ISS	JPL · 10973
10974 Carolalbert	2225 T-2	Carol Handahl and Albert O. Grender, aunt and uncle of D. W. E. Green, who made the identifications involving this object.	JPL · 10974
10975 Schelderode	2246 T-2	Schelderode is an agrarian village founded in the tenth century and located along the river Schelde in Flanders, Belgium. It has been the workplace and residence of Belgian astronomer Christiaan Sterken for more than three decades.	JPL · 10975
10976 Wubbena	2287 T-2	Eltjo Wubbena (born 1947) was president of the NVWS, the Dutch popular-astronomy society, from 1975 to 1985.	JPL · 10976
10977 Mathlener	3177 T-2	Edwin Mathlener (born 1962), Dutch astronomy amateur, director of Dutch astronomy information center "De Koepel" and editor of its magazine "Zenit" and almanac "Sterrengids".	JPL · 10977
10978 Bärbchen	4095 T-2	Barbara Börngen ("Bärbchen"; 1934–2010) wife of German astronomer and discoverer of minor planets, Freimut Börngen	JPL · 10978
10979 Fristephenson	4171 T-2	Francis Richard Stephenson (born 1941), a British historian of astronomy.	JPL · 10979
10980 Breimer	4294 T-2	Douwe Breimer (born 1943), a Dutch pharmacologist and President of Leiden University	JPL · 10980
10981 Fransaris	1148 T-3	Frans Saris (born 1942), a Dutch atomic and molecular physicist, dean of sciences at Leiden University	JPL · 10981
10982 Poerink	2672 T-3	Urijan Poerink (born 1953), Dutch meteor researcher	JPL · 10982
10983 Smolders	3196 T-3	Petrus L. L. Smolders (born 1940), Dutch scientist, writer and journalist, spaceflight and astronomy popularizer	JPL · 10983
10984 Gispen	3507 T-3	Willem Hendrik Gispen (born 1943), a Dutch neuroscientist who contributed to the establishment of the Sonnenborgh museum and observatory.	JPL · 10984
10985 Feast	4017 T-3	Michael Feast (1926–), a South African astronomer	JPL · 10985
10986 Govert	4313 T-3	Govert Schilling (born 1956), Dutch amateur astronomer and science writer, journalist, and astronomy popularizer.	JPL · 10986
10988 Feinstein	1968 OL	Alejandro Feinstein (born 1928), an Argentinian astronomer at La Plata Observatory and co-founder of the Argentinian Astronomical Association (Asociación Argentina de Astronomía)	JPL · 10988
10989 Dolios	1973 SL_{1}	Dolios, the faithful servant of Laertes at Ithaca.	JPL · 10989
10990 Okunev	1973 SF_{6}	Boris Nikolaevich Okunev (1897–1961), professor at the D. F. Ustinov Mechanical Institute in Leningrad, was a scientist in theoretical mechanics and ballistics.	MPC · 10990
10991 Dulov	1974 RY_{1}	Viktor Georgievich Dulov (1929–2001), a Russian professor who was known for his work in theoretical gas dynamics and applied mathematics	JPL · 10991
10992 Veryuslaviya	1974 SF	The Chubenko family: Vera Ivanovna (born 1951) and her sons Vyacheslav (born 1973), an astronomer and fanciful writer, and Yury (born 1978).	JPL · 10992
10994 Fouchard	1978 EU_{9}	Marc Fouchard (born 1972) is a professor at the Laboratoire d´Astronomie de Université Lille and collaborator at the Institut de Mécanique Céleste et de Calcul des Éphémérides (IMCCE) (France), specializing in the dynamics of long-period comets.	JPL · 10994
10996 Armandspitz	1978 NX_{7}	Armand Spitz (1904–1971), was an American planetarium designer.	JPL · 10996
10997 Gahm	1978 RX_{7}	Gösta Gahm (born 1942), Swedish astronomer at Stockholm Observatory	MPC · 10997
10999 Braga-Ribas	1978 VC_{6}	Felipe Braga-Ribas (born 1982) is a professor at the Federal Technological University of Paraná, Curitiba (Brazil) specializing in predictions and observations of stellar occultations, including the detection of rings around the centaur (10199) Chariklo.	JPL · 10999

back to top

Preceded by 9,001–10,000	Meanings of minor-planet names List of minor planets: 10,001–11,000	Succeeded by 11,001–12,000
