= Heike Rauer =

German exoplanet researcher (born 1961)

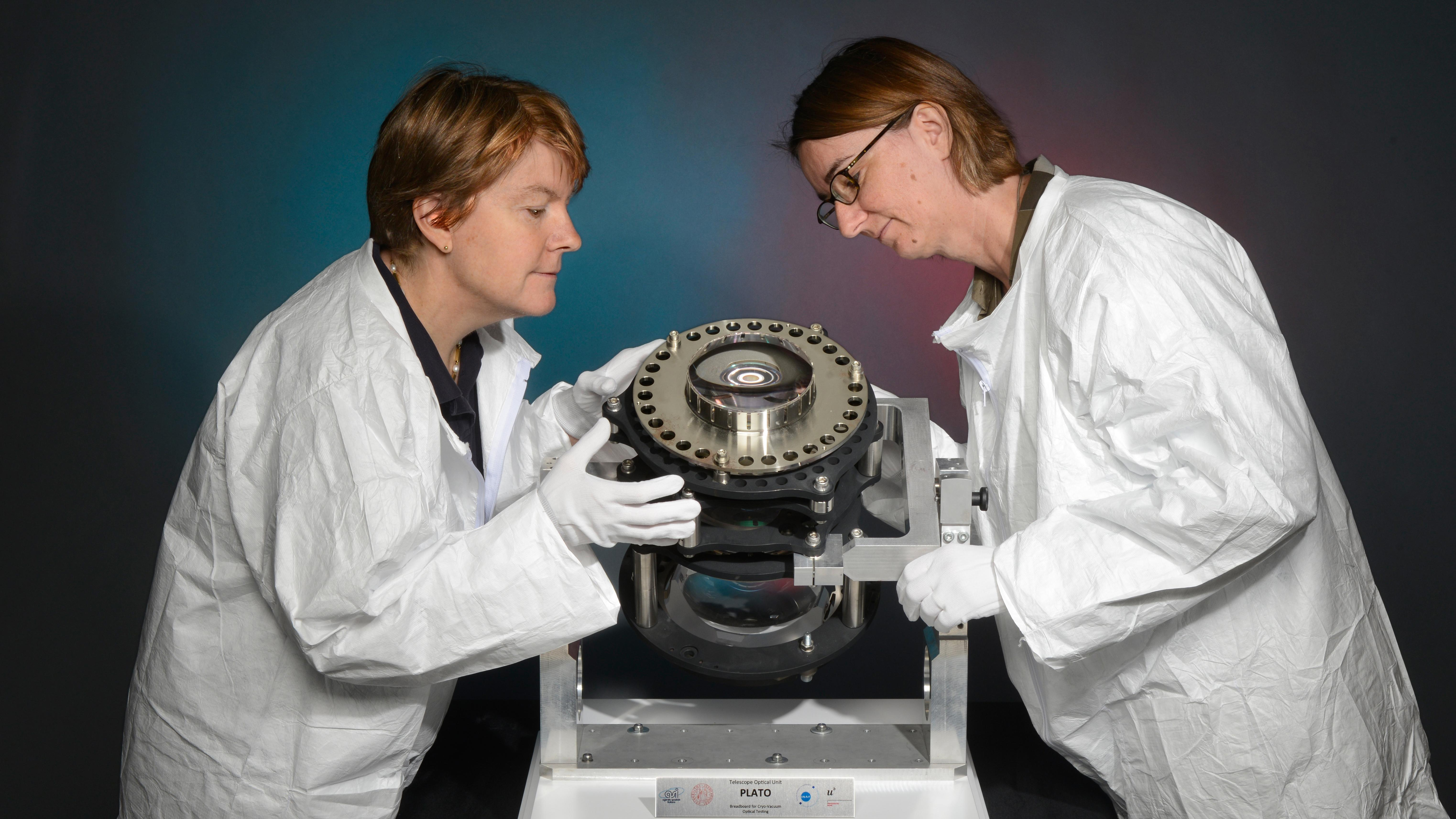
Heike Rauer (r.) with Ruth Titz-Weider

Heike Rauer (born 18 June 1961) is a German astronomer specializing in exoplanets and their detection methods. Rauer has been the Head of the Institute of Planetary Research at the German Aerospace Center since November 2017. She is also the head of the instrument consortium for the European Space Agency's PLATO space telescope, which set to launch in 2026. Previously, she is a member of CoRoT, Rosetta's MIRO spectrometer and the Next Generation Transit Survey collaborations.

Rauer said that her inspiration to follow space science came from the Apollo program, though later in life, due to her dislike of physics in school, she applied to an art college and got rejected. By the next year, that art college accepted Rauer's application, but she declined the offer to study physics in the University of Hanover. Her doctorate thesis is about plasma comet tails. Her name is on one of the minor planets, 10025 Rauer.
