= List of named minor planets: H =

This is a partial list of named minor planets, containing all those starting with the letter H, as of 28 September 2026. It is ordered in a case-insensitive, alphabetical manner and contains a total of 1,219 entries. Grey minor planets have no article and redirect to the list of minor planets instead (see List of minor planets § Main index).

== H ==
- 4066 Haapavesi
- 3853 Haas
- 23804 Haber
- 333005 Haberle
- 59390 Habermas
- 207666 Habibula
- 5037 Habing
- 85199 Habsburg
- 32614 Hacegarcia
- 10540 Hachigoroh
- 11108 Hachimantai
- 6200 Hachinohe
- 6612 Hachioji
- 34399 Hachiojihigashi
- 8558 Hack
- 549107 Hackitamás
- 55397 Hackman
- 10382 Hadamard
- 39799 Hadano
- 14143 Hadfield
- 24051 Hadinger
- 7446 Hadrianus
- 2151 Hadwiger
- 193158 Haechan
- 12323 Haeckel
- 13064 Haemhouts
- 12610 Hãfez
- 1894 Haffner
- 199838 Hafili
- 30188 Hafsasaeed
- 682 Hagar
- 92300 Hagelin
- 19091 Hagen
- 7279 Hagfors
- 10688 Haghighipour
- 11127 Hagi
- 1971 Hagihara
- 12802 Hagino
- 8929 Haginoshinji
- 55838 Hagongda
- 3676 Hahn
- 368 Haidea
- 22413 Haifu
- 17746 Haigha
- 135268 Haigneré
- 12477 Haiku
- 28582 Haileyosborn
- 3024 Hainan
- 26879 Haines
- 160215 Haines-Stiles
- 69869 Haining
- 7316 Hajdú
- 9822 Hajduková
- 1995 Hajek
- 58495 Hajin
- 33390 Hajlasz
- 164268 Hajmási
- 151242 Hajós
- 247652 Hajossy
- 21403 Haken
- 10400 Hakkaisan
- 11107 Hakkoda
- 18469 Hakodate
- 1483 Hakoila
- 1098 Hakone
- 82346 Hakos
- 4812 Hakuhou
- 29337 Hakurojo
- 46689 Hakuryuko
- 9000 Hal
- 5028 Halaesus
- 238710 Halassy
- 518 Halawe
- 30372 Halback
- 7915 Halbrook
- 7368 Haldancohn
- 36061 Haldane
- 1024 Hale
- 171183 Haleakala
- 368116 Half-Moon
- 117384 Halharrison
- 345868 Halicarnassus
- 23331 Halimzeidan
- 12974 Halitherses
- 3299 Hall
- 32608 Hallas
- 85196 Halle
- 1308 Halleria
- 15071 Hallerstein
- 2688 Halley
- 3944 Halliday
- 32006 Hallisey
- 2640 Hällström
- 343444 Halluzinelle
- 541627 Halmospál
- 29208 Halorentz
- 20274 Halperin
- 15146 Halpov
- 15904 Halstead
- 1460 Haltia
- 24059 Halverson
- 5720 Halweaver
- 7486 Hamabe
- 21966 Hamadori
- 9053 Hamamelis
- 15736 Hamanasu
- 29373 Hamanowa
- 5468 Hamatonbetsu
- 120460 Hambach
- 301949 Hambálek
- 449 Hamburga
- 2535 Hämeenlinna
- 110026 Hamill
- 452 Hamiltonia
- 2733 Hamina
- 3530 Hammel
- 6044 Hammer-Purgstall
- 7917 Hammergren
- 723 Hammonia
- 7207 Hammurabi
- 18961 Hampfreeman
- 16255 Hampton
- 9373 Hamra
- 24156 Hamsasridhar
- 5838 Hamsun
- 14226 Hamura
- 109097 Hamuy
- 543302 Hamvasbéla
- 20856 Hamzabari
- 127196 Hanaceplechová
- 15556 Hanafy
- 5777 Hanaki
- 11282 Hanakusa
- 6418 Hanamigahara
- 11878 Hanamiyama
- 75058 Hanau
- 19307 Hanayama
- 15387 Hanazukayama
- 3731 Hancock
- 2166 Handahl
- 3826 Handel
- 2718 Handley
- 22939 Handlin
- 24210 Handsberry
- 23504 Haneda
- 7902 Hanff
- 48700 Hanggao
- 35313 Hangtianyuan
- 24541 Hangzou
- 15583 Hanick
- 333571 Hanish
- 34267 Haniya
- 4582 Hank
- 239792 Hankakováčová
- 13943 Hankgreen
- 2299 Hanko
- 26605 Hanley
- 1668 Hanna
- 38020 Hannadam
- 100027 Hannaharendt
- 34128 Hannahbrown
- 12885 Hannahguan
- 33834 Hannahkaplan
- 28571 Hannahlarson
- 72993 Hannahlivsey
- 117614 Hannahmclain
- 13246 Hannahshu
- 28742 Hannahsteele
- 21695 Hannahwolf
- 429031 Hannavonhoerner
- 266051 Hannawieser
- 4664 Hanner
- 2152 Hannibal
- 85119 Hannieschaft
- 12249 Hannorein
- 295565 Hannover
- 250164 Hannsruder
- 2573 Hannu Olavi
- 7816 Hanoi
- 10032 Hans-Ulrich
- 480 Hansa
- 20123 Hansamundsen
- 359822 Hansboesgaard
- 11245 Hansderijk
- 4775 Hansen
- 34678 Hansenestruch
- 8988 Hansenkoharcheck
- 12134 Hansfriedeman
- 201308 Hansgrade
- 95782 Hansgraf
- 29328 Hanshintigers
- 310652 Hansjörgdittus
- 5475 Hanskennedy
- 454419 Hansklausreif
- 190139 Hansküng
- 1118 Hanskya
- 182674 Hanslmeier
- 243109 Hansludwig
- 52308 Hanspeterröser
- 11019 Hansrott
- 13177 Hansschmidt
- 4991 Hansuess
- 495253 Hanszimmer
- 588255 Hantang
- 2211 Hanuman
- 27986 Hanuš
- 10173 Hanzelkazikmund
- 3257 Hanzlík
- 25683 Haochenhong
- 27407 Haodo
- 154004 Haolei
- 31904 Haoruochen
- 34714 Haozhang
- 28206 Haozhongning
- 724 Hapag
- 3549 Hapke
- 578 Happelia
- 7345 Happer
- 27332 Happritchard
- 4640 Hara
- 6399 Harada
- 37669 Haragentaro
- 17933 Haraguchi
- 353677 Harald
- 196035 Haraldbill
- 35357 Haraldlesch
- 7143 Haramura
- 580619 Harangiszabolcs
- 495287 Harari
- 2851 Harbin
- 25374 Harbrucker
- 9251 Harch
- 28077 Hard
- 14308 Hardeman
- 8140 Hardersen
- 2003 Harding
- 24062 Hardister
- 2866 Hardy
- 20279 Harel
- 1372 Haremari
- 192155 Hargittai
- 11777 Hargrave
- 10955 Harig
- 2582 Harimaya-Bashi
- 35143 Harimoto
- 24944 Harish-Chandra
- 33609 Harishpalani
- 333183 Harishswabhash
- 25836 Harishvemuri
- 7101 Haritina
- 202599 Harkányi
- 3842 Harlansmith
- 22570 Harleyzhang
- 47002 Harlingten
- 10514 Harlow
- 100292 Harmandir
- 40 Harmonia
- 114096 Haroldbier
- 6761 Haroldconnolly
- 95980 Haroldhill
- 44117 Haroldlarson
- 6443 Harpalion
- 16254 Harper
- 11715 Harperclark
- 19482 Harperlee
- 1744 Harriet
- 3216 Harrington
- 30483 Harringtonpinto
- 2929 Harris
- 4149 Harrison
- 28821 Harryanselmo
- 5972 Harryatkinson
- 6907 Harryford
- 185560 Harrykroto
- 31588 Harrypaul
- 293926 Harrystine
- 423433 Harsányi
- 26586 Harshaw
- 1914 Hartbeespoortdam
- 27963 Hartkopf
- 4768 Hartley
- 3341 Hartmann
- 1531 Hartmut
- 223685 Hartopp
- 81915 Hartwick
- 9319 Hartzell
- 28174 Harue
- 10582 Harumi
- 12734 Haruna
- 18177 Harunaga
- 6423 Harunasan
- 24910 Haruoando
- 5286 Haruomukai
- 5848 Harutoriko
- 114023 Harvanek
- 736 Harvard
- 4278 Harvey
- 2853 Harvill
- 12143 Harwit
- 7040 Harwood
- 90328 Haryou
- 10249 Harz
- 48631 Hasantufan
- 9408 Haseakira
- 7240 Hasebe
- 8431 Haseda
- 3227 Hasegawa
- 32272 Hasegawayuya
- 2734 Hašek
- 100691 Hasetoshitsuka
- 8301 Haseyuji
- 145062 Hashikami
- 11545 Hashimoto
- 7611 Hashitatsu
- 18110 HASI
- 417978 Haslehner
- 37939 Hašler
- 210213 Hasler-Gloor
- 365131 Hassberge
- 7478 Hasse
- 11265 Hasselmann
- 13014 Hasslacher
- 333613 Hasten
- 16589 Hastrup
- 389293 Hasubick
- 6887 Hasuo
- 23809 Haswell
- 18472 Hatada
- 9114 Hatakeyama
- 4051 Hatanaka
- 2340 Hathor
- 15303 Hatoyamamachi
- 2436 Hatshepsut
- 9112 Hatsulars
- 17759 Hatta
- 7308 Hattori
- 18779 Hattyhong
- 2407 Haug
- 10508 Haughey
- 302652 Hauke
- 612787 Haumannpéter
- 136108 Haumea
- 2870 Haupt
- 8381 Hauptmann
- 24947 Hausdorff
- 14068 Hauserová
- 16100 Hausknecht
- 16524 Hausmann
- 552727 Hauszmann
- 7755 Haute-Provence
- 15705 Hautot
- 11095 Havana
- 28342 Haverhals
- 30126 Haviland
- 362 Havnia
- 48575 Hawaii
- 17945 Hawass
- 3452 Hawke
- 7672 Hawking
- 8710 Hawley
- 1824 Haworth
- 3125 Hay
- 17656 Hayabusa
- 11129 Hayachine
- 4773 Hayakawa
- 6880 Hayamiyu
- 11324 Hayamizu
- 4771 Hayashi
- 30886 Hayashitadashi
- 22874 Haydeephelps
- 25462 Haydenmetsky
- 3941 Haydn
- 347016 Haydnhuntley
- 10926 Hayeri
- 28788 Hayes-Gehrke
- 139028 Haynald
- 8082 Haynes
- 11718 Hayward
- 10832 Hazamashigetomi
- 9305 Hazard
- 3846 Hazel
- 31863 Hazelcoffman
- 8462 Hazelsears
- 548690 Hazucha
- 27480 Heablonsky
- 70718 HEAF
- 66479 Healy
- 3023 Heard
- 5207 Hearnshaw
- 14564 Heasley
- 8110 Heath
- 3922 Heather
- 130090 Heatherbowles
- 41661 Heathercraig
- 154554 Heatherelliott
- 18679 Heatherenae
- 27495 Heatherfennell
- 22599 Heatherhall
- 22873 Heatherholt
- 47219 Heatherkoehler
- 25765 Heatherlynne
- 21856 Heathermaria
- 32201 Heathermckay
- 133850 Heatherroper
- 198110 Heathrhoades
- 6 Hebe
- 2505 Hebei
- 10902 Hebeishida
- 271763 Hebrewu
- 9857 Hecamede
- 10484 Hecht
- 1650 Heckmann
- 19156 Heco
- 108 Hecuba
- 20282 Hedberg
- 207 Hedda
- 15050 Heddal
- 1251 Hedera
- 5837 Hedin
- 476 Hedwig
- 32442 Heejaelee
- 34143 Heeric
- 26842 Hefele
- 19423 Hefter
- 34184 Hegde
- 220229 Hegedüs
- 14845 Hegel
- 31380 Hegyesi
- 200002 Hehe
- 207661 Hehuanshan
- 7023 Heiankyo
- 325 Heidelberga
- 218987 Heidenhain
- 2521 Heidi
- 10252 Heidigraf
- 27084 Heidilarson
- 18152 Heidimanning
- 392120 Heidiursula
- 1732 Heike
- 104020 Heilbronn
- 2380 Heilongjiang
- 3990 Heimdal
- 10637 Heimlich
- 549744 Heimpál
- 17447 Heindl
- 7109 Heine
- 2016 Heinemann
- 264045 Heinerklinkrad
- 6371 Heinlein
- 12654 Heinofalcke
- 2943 Heinrich
- 322510 Heinrichgrüber
- 10509 Heinrichkayser
- 249515 Heinrichsen
- 721154 Heinz
- 663271 Heinzreinhardt
- 4290 Heisei
- 13149 Heisenberg
- 5287 Heishu
- 2379 Heiskanen
- 22291 Heitifer
- 4014 Heizman
- 100 Hekate
- 2245 Hekatostos
- 80184 Hekigoto
- 85095 Hekla
- 624 Hektor
- 949 Hel
- 699 Hela
- 16969 Helamuda
- 8479 Held
- 101 Helena
- 28994 Helenabates
- 16186 Helenajiang
- 69756 Hélènecourtois
- 6333 Helenejacq
- 219286 Helenewinters
- 162978 Helenhart
- 433763 Helenkirk
- 590464 Helenlawson
- 32277 Helenliu
- 33737 Helenlyons
- 111696 Helenorman
- 1872 Helenos
- 78432 Helensailer
- 9038 Helensteel
- 24422 Helentressa
- 28137 Helenyao
- 123818 Helenzier
- 1845 Helewalda
- 8067 Helfenstein
- 2290 Helffrich
- 522 Helga
- 6305 Helgoland
- 8980 Heliaca
- 21392 Helibrochier
- 30942 Helicaon
- 1075 Helina
- 895 Helio
- 967 Helionape
- 1370 Hella
- 10250 Hellahaasse
- 26301 Hellawillis
- 276975 Heller
- 31502 Hellerstein
- 1273 Helma
- 11573 Helmholtz
- 183635 Helmi
- 29250 Helmutmoritz
- 13331 Helos
- 10549 Helsingborg
- 1495 Helsinki
- 113390 Helvetia
- 6972 Helvetius
- 801 Helwerthia
- 26739 Hemaeberhart
- 25022 Hemalibatra
- 9671 Hemera
- 9615 Hemerijckx
- 3656 Hemingway
- 12354 Hemmerechts
- 21449 Hemmick
- 9820 Hempel
- 10124 Hemse
- 2085 Henan
- 99915 Henarejos
- 2005 Hencke
- 33529 Henden
- 121479 Hendershot
- 3077 Henderson
- 6066 Hendricks
- 20317 Hendrickson
- 4506 Hendrie
- 7840 Hendrika
- 12954 Hendrikcasimir
- 724875 Hengchun
- 10021 Henja
- 12643 Henkolthof
- 154378 Hennessy
- 14164 Hennigar
- 11012 Henning
- 7005 Henninghaack
- 20589 Hennyadmoni
- 12635 Hennylamers
- 6122 Henrard
- 225 Henrietta
- 26183 Henrigodard
- 826 Henrika
- 260886 Henritudor
- 1516 Henry
- 4384 Henrybuhl
- 27365 Henryfitz
- 18979 Henryfong
- 254422 Henrykent
- 29658 Henrylin
- 19454 Henrymarr
- 9016 Henrymoore
- 193736 Henrythroop
- 27710 Henseling
- 60532 Henson
- 139233 Henych
- 1365 Henyey
- 6642 Henze
- 72059 Heojun
- 2212 Hephaistos
- 14080 Heppenheim
- 103 Hera
- 5143 Heracles
- 5204 Herakleitos
- 3696 Herald
- 880 Herba
- 4481 Herbelin
- 23774 Herbelliott
- 1363 Herberta
- 678300 Herbertcouriol
- 634981 Herbertgrice
- 583418 Herbertgush
- 295471 Herbertnitsch
- 7378 Herbertpalme
- 9931 Herbhauptman
- 11754 Herbig
- 16117 Herbst
- 26300 Herbweiss
- 20156 Herbwindolf
- 532 Herculina
- 458 Hercynia
- 549185 Herczeg
- 8158 Herder
- 6843 Heremon
- 1885 Herero
- 10669 Herfordia
- 1652 Hergé
- 3099 Hergenrother
- 1751 Herget
- 3234 Hergiani
- 211473 Herin
- 33704 Herinkang
- 923 Herluga
- 21544 Hermainkhan
- 215089 Hermanfrid
- 10239 Hermann
- 8818 Hermannbondi
- 23889 Hermanngrassmann
- 9762 Hermannhesse
- 32267 Hermannweyl
- 190504 Hermanottó
- 260824 Hermanus
- 346 Hermentaria
- 69230 Hermes
- 685 Hermia
- 27984 Herminefranz
- 121 Hermione
- 4758 Hermitage
- 392952 Hermitageshelter
- 24998 Hermite
- 2630 Hermod
- 19079 Hernández
- 13292 Hernandezmon
- 545839 Hernánletelier
- 6686 Hernius
- 546 Herodias
- 3092 Herodotus
- 3970 Herrán
- 198673 Herrero
- 12567 Herreweghe
- 1579 Herrick
- 127030 Herrington
- 4124 Herriot
- 2000 Herschel
- 6153 Hershey
- 206 Hersilia
- 31203 Hersman
- 706882 Hertageßner
- 135 Hertha
- 16761 Hertz
- 1693 Hertzsprung
- 355029 Herve
- 3316 Herzberg
- 3052 Herzen
- 1952 Hesburgh
- 8550 Hesiodos
- 69 Hesperia
- 34101 Hesrivastava
- 2844 Hess
- 5846 Hessen
- 46 Hestia
- 15971 Hestroffer
- 6127 Hetherington
- 82232 Heuberger
- 4602 Heudier
- 4133 Heureka
- 21075 Heussinger
- 5703 Hevelius
- 375067 Hewins
- 79286 Hexiantu
- 24168 Hexlein
- 2473 Heyerdahl
- 28295 Heyizheng
- 5446 Heyler
- 7738 Heyman
- 3069 Heyrovský
- 3746 Heyuan
- 291633 Heyun
- 91035 Hezehui
- 21118 Hezimmermann
- 185577 Hhaihao
- 8762 Hiaticula
- 20467 Hibbitts
- 2441 Hibbs
- 11494 Hibiki
- 11719 Hicklen
- 2220 Hicks
- 33896 Hickson
- 944 Hidalgo
- 14901 Hidatakayama
- 12176 Hidayat
- 23173 Hideaki
- 9081 Hideakianno
- 15248 Hidekazu
- 46727 Hidekimatsuyama
- 6345 Hideo
- 6902 Hideoasada
- 12047 Hideomitani
- 4948 Hideonishimura
- 90953 Hideosaitou
- 12003 Hideosugai
- 6459 Hidesan
- 49699 Hidetakasato
- 9964 Hideyonoguchi
- 39726 Hideyukitezuka
- 6731 Hiei
- 8579 Hieizan
- 7119 Hiera
- 24999 Hieronymus
- 26811 Hiesinger
- 14606 Hifleischer
- 14316 Higashichichibu
- 29157 Higashinihon
- 32229 Higashino
- 19210 Higayoshihiro
- 103739 Higginbotham
- 6552 Higginson
- 29470 Higgs
- 3025 Higson
- 97582 Hijikawa
- 20114 Hikage
- 5564 Hikari
- 44475 Hikarumasai
- 29404 Hikarusato
- 20381 Hikaruyabuta
- 58084 Hiketaon
- 6329 Hikonejyo
- 13315 Hilana
- 242529 Hilaomar
- 996 Hilaritas
- 5573 Hilarydownes
- 12022 Hilbert
- 153 Hilda
- 149951 Hildakowalski
- 684 Hildburg
- 5661 Hildebrand
- 898 Hildegard
- 7311 Hildehan
- 241368 Hildjózsef
- 928 Hildrun
- 236785 Hilendàrski
- 1642 Hill
- 3130 Hillary
- 19500 Hillaryfultz
- 18803 Hillaryoas
- 6395 Hilliard
- 342431 Hilo
- 4924 Hiltner
- 17657 Himawari
- 29199 Himeji
- 11933 Himuka
- 25608 Hincapie
- 1897 Hind
- 5157 Hindemith
- 3404 Hinderer
- 48447 Hingley
- 18948 Hinkle
- 37565 Hinoki
- 5072 Hioki
- 21521 Hippalgaonkar
- 4000 Hipparchus
- 17492 Hippasos
- 426 Hippo
- 9054 Hippocastanum
- 5085 Hippocrene
- 692 Hippodamia
- 30698 Hippokoon
- 14367 Hippokrates
- 129137 Hippolochos
- 10295 Hippolyta
- 134419 Hippothous
- 24128 Hipsman
- 6390 Hirabayashi
- 22277 Hirado
- 8144 Hiragagennai
- 10609 Hirai
- 9333 Hiraimasa
- 29249 Hiraizumi
- 43908 Hiraku
- 10029 Hiramperkins
- 11072 Hiraoka
- 4799 Hirasawa
- 1999 Hirayama
- 65635 Hirayamashin
- 6975 Hiroaki
- 8410 Hiroakiohno
- 110743 Hirobumi
- 55875 Hirohatagaoka
- 7264 Hirohatanaka
- 9323 Hirohisasato
- 8931 Hirokimatsuo
- 6225 Hiroko
- 29394 Hirokohamanowa
- 9986 Hirokun
- 4905 Hiromi
- 6709 Hiromiyuki
- 6978 Hironaka
- 9437 Hironari
- 2356 Hirons
- 189261 Hiroo
- 1612 Hirose
- 10064 Hirosetamotsu
- 10009 Hirosetanso
- 4677 Hiroshi
- 15840 Hiroshiendou
- 30879 Hiroshikanai
- 2247 Hiroshima
- 54237 Hiroshimanabe
- 20382 Hiroshinaraoka
- 9424 Hiroshinishiyama
- 26123 Hiroshiyoshida
- 20383 Hirotakasawada
- 124844 Hirotamasao
- 14214 Hirsch
- 3172 Hirst
- 30944 Hiruma
- 706 Hirundo
- 7493 Hirzo
- 28173 Hisakichi
- 6094 Hisako
- 15238 Hisaohori
- 10224 Hisashi
- 5354 Hisayo
- 17520 Hisayukiyoshio
- 804 Hispania
- 2746 Hissao
- 14491 Hitachiomiya
- 73857 Hitaneichi
- 7032 Hitchcock
- 57901 Hitchens
- 9386 Hitomi
- 11457 Hitomikobayashi
- 30838 Hitomiyamasaki
- 9411 Hitomiyamoto
- 11317 Hitoshi
- 7235 Hitsuzan
- 10782 Hittmair
- 6883 Hiuchigatake
- 13978 Hiwasa
- 10601 Hiwatashi
- 20427 Hjalmar
- 8868 Hjorter
- 6119 Hjorth
- 73704 Hladiuk
- 10763 Hlawka
- 67019 Hlohovec
- 15960 Hluboká
- 27595 Hnath
- 3225 Hoag
- 4225 Hobart
- 7012 Hobbes
- 97472 Hobby
- 4774 Hobetsu
- 18777 Hobson
- 10104 Hoburgsgubben
- 16544 Hochlehnert
- 14203 Hocking
- 338284 Hodál
- 4669 Høder
- 14466 Hodge
- 5422 Hodgkin
- 2888 Hodgson
- 21047 Hodierna
- 22222 Hodios
- 17486 Hodler
- 120153 Hoekenga
- 8111 Hoepli
- 1662 Hoffmann
- 1726 Hoffmeister
- 347020 Hofheim
- 180857 Hofigéza
- 8057 Hofmannsthal
- 13301 Hofsteen
- 25109 Hofving
- 185744 Hogan
- 12613 Hogarth
- 156542 Hogg
- 526997 Hohai
- 10243 Hohe Meissner
- 788 Hohensteina
- 85215 Hohenzollern
- 14872 Hoher List
- 72060 Hohhot
- 9661 Hohmann
- 273836 Hoijyusek
- 552855 Hoitsy
- 13473 Hokema
- 3720 Hokkaido
- 64296 Hokoon
- 14566 Hōkūleʻa
- 12614 Hokusai
- 9191 Hokuto
- 5374 Hokutosei
- 6064 Holašovice
- 6956 Holbach
- 3033 Holbaek
- 8122 Holbein
- 45512 Holcomb
- 872 Holda
- 2974 Holden
- 9189 Hölderlin
- 14835 Holdridge
- 313384 Holetschek
- 4431 Holeungholee
- 9266 Holger
- 60006 Holgermandel
- 38238 Holíč
- 365443 Holiday
- 1132 Hollandia
- 46280 Hollar
- 28057 Hollars
- 30534 Holler
- 31557 Holleybakich
- 18193 Hollilydrury
- 6711 Holliman
- 4084 Hollis
- 9144 Hollisjohnson
- 12113 Hollows
- 19955 Hollý
- 17145 Hollycheng
- 28953 Hollyerickson
- 433512 Hollyholman
- 30174 Hollyjackson
- 117563 Hollyoscarson
- 3666 Holman
- 3573 Holmberg
- 5477 Holmes
- 3764 Holmesacourt
- 587299 Holmgren
- 10105 Holmhällar
- 378 Holmia
- 20360 Holsapple
- 3590 Holst
- 6402 Holstein
- 4435 Holt
- 4277 Holubov
- 71282 Holuby
- 51261 Holuša
- 13421 Holvorcem
- 5700 Homerus
- 22952 Hommasachi
- 25074 Honami
- 3904 Honda
- 457248 Hondius
- 11055 Honduras
- 27846 Honegger
- 5536 Honeycutt
- 15627 Hong
- 3297 Hong Kong
- 94400 Hongdaeyong
- 211077 Hongkang
- 42112 Hongkyumoon
- 20384 Hongsuhyim
- 32633 Honguyang
- 51983 Hönig
- 1699 Honkasalo
- 33761 Honoranavid
- 236 Honoria
- 233893 Honthyhanna
- 29484 Honzaveselý
- 35355 Honzík
- 6072 Hooghoudt
- 3514 Hooke
- 932 Hooveria
- 17020 Hopemeraengus
- 25142 Hopf
- 2938 Hopi
- 17954 Hopkins
- 1985 Hopmann
- 3499 Hoppe
- 5773 Hopper
- 5423 Horahořejš
- 44530 Horáková
- 6822 Horálek
- 164701 Horanyi
- 4294 Horatius
- 17941 Horbatt
- 2435 Horemheb
- 574691 Horgerantal
- 23718 Horgos
- 8500 Hori
- 7844 Horikawa
- 10885 Horimasato
- 20385 Horiuchi
- 11409 Horkheimer
- 3137 Horky
- 805 Hormuthia
- 3744 Horn-d'Arturo
- 11132 Horne
- 22414 Hornschemeier
- 6712 Hornstein
- 11720 Horodyskyj
- 8374 Horohata
- 6176 Horrigan
- 3078 Horrocks
- 10544 Hörsnebara
- 30281 Horstman
- 2913 Horta
- 13116 Hortensia
- 84996 Hortobágy
- 21527 Horton
- 8966 Hortulana
- 4323 Hortulus
- 1924 Horus
- 14447 Hosakakanai
- 6300 Hosamu
- 2909 Hoshi-no-ie
- 3814 Hoshi-no-mura
- 14926 Hoshide
- 6088 Hoshigakubo
- 7429 Hoshikawa
- 3828 Hoshino
- 4971 Hoshinohiroba
- 6989 Hoshinosato
- 17567 Hoshinoyakata
- 15786 Hoshioka
- 7693 Hoshitakuhai
- 90875 Hoshitori
- 719612 Hoshizaki
- 16624 Hoshizawa
- 12793 Hosinokokai
- 12223 Hoskin
- 46631 Hosoikatsumasa
- 29251 Hosokawa
- 16648 Hossi
- 483454 Hosszúkatinka
- 8218 Hosty
- 11138 Hotakadake
- 3705 Hotellasilla
- 290156 Houde
- 361450 Houellebecq
- 10612 Houffalize
- 48047 Houghten
- 17673 Houkidaisen
- 8407 Houlahan
- 309295 Hourenzhi
- 4950 House
- 16259 Housinger
- 2550 Houssay
- 3031 Houston
- 9690 Houtgast
- 10650 Houtman
- 236845 Houxianglin
- 181829 Houyunde
- 2534 Houzeau
- 20998 Houzeaudelehaie
- 24945 Houziaux
- 9069 Hovland
- 34871 Howaiho
- 12561 Howard
- 28210 Howardfeng
- 15396 Howardmoore
- 217492 Howardtaylor
- 15091 Howell
- 327989 Howieglatter
- 5045 Hoyin
- 8077 Hoyle
- 96254 Hoyo
- 3888 Hoyt
- 4112 Hrabal
- 74024 Hrabě
- 13804 Hrazany
- 225238 Hristobotev
- 90368 Hristopavlov
- 25688 Hritzo
- 24862 Hromec
- 5946 Hrozný
- 12006 Hruschka
- 18841 Hruška
- 31374 Hruskova
- 179221 Hrvojebožić
- 168234 Hsi Ching
- 349785 Hsiaotejen
- 17857 Hsieh
- 34792 Hsiehcheching
- 212631 Hsinchu
- 21633 Hsingpenyuan
- 11462 Hsingwenlin
- 611070 Hsurueron
- 37163 Huachucaclub
- 246504 Hualien
- 364875 Hualookeng
- 777018 Huangchunming
- 23098 Huanghuang
- 215023 Huangjiqing
- 48636 Huangkun
- 49466 Huanglin
- 3502 Huangpu
- 120569 Huangrunqian
- 79316 Huangshan
- 3014 Huangsushu
- 20179 Huangtianyi
- 652223 Huangtushui
- 20132 Huangwei
- 21634 Huangweikang
- 31360 Huangyihsuan
- 52487 Huazhongkejida
- 4331 Hubbard
- 2069 Hubble
- 65657 Hube
- 2547 Hubei
- 6126 Hubelmatt
- 321673 Huber
- 260 Huberta
- 49384 Hubertnaudot
- 9631 Hubertreeves
- 12641 Hubertushenrichs
- 301511 Hubinon
- 8847 Huch
- 4656 Huchra
- 21258 Huckins
- 75972 Huddleston
- 15399 Hudec
- 562964 Hudin
- 5723 Hudson
- 7921 Huebner
- 379 Huenna
- 333626 Huerta
- 21636 Huertas
- 10839 Hufeland
- 2635 Huggins
- 71000 Hughdowns
- 1878 Hughes
- 341361 Hughespack
- 20789 Hughgrant
- 154005 Hughharris
- 14146 Hughmaclean
- 8899 Hughmiller
- 32079 Hughsavoldelli
- 2106 Hugo
- 12381 Hugoclaus
- 287693 Hugonnaivilma
- 215809 Hugoschwarz
- 5177 Hugowolf
- 33573 Hugrace
- 20149 Huh
- 34778 Huhunglick
- 9488 Huia
- 5390 Huichiming
- 23669 Huihuifan
- 333384 Huikang
- 88297 Huikilolani
- 51166 Huimanto
- 17022 Huisjen
- 52387 Huitzilopochtli
- 169834 Hujie
- 236683 Hujingyao
- 30844 Hukeller
- 37279 Hukvaldy
- 34738 Hulbert
- 4285 Hulkower
- 3988 Huma
- 2070 Humason
- 4877 Humboldt
- 10097 Humbroncos
- 7009 Hume
- 12050 Humecronyn
- 22415 Humeivey
- 7705 Humeln
- 32144 Humes
- 196476 Humfernández
- 16398 Hummel
- 9913 Humperdinck
- 10172 Humphreys
- 17627 Humptydumpty
- 28536 Hunaiwen
- 2592 Hunan
- 6231 Hundertwasser
- 231368 Hunfalvy
- 6834 Hunfeld
- 434 Hungaria
- 534390 Huningsheng
- 19788 Hunker
- 1452 Hunnia
- 10254 Hunsrück
- 171429 Hunstead
- 23041 Hunt
- 9122 Hunten
- 34677 Hunterwilliams
- 7225 Huntress
- 129060 Huntskretsch
- 161913 Hunyadi
- 3730 Hurban
- 3434 Hurless
- 16929 Hurník
- 3939 Huruhata
- 3425 Hurukawa
- 29472 Hurvínek
- 25237 Hurwitz
- 1840 Hus
- 15544 Hushicheng
- 30228 Hushoucun
- 7528 Huskvarna
- 315012 Hutchings
- 5308 Hutchison
- 3203 Huth
- 117572 Hutsebaut
- 6130 Hutton
- 38628 Huya
- 2801 Huygens
- 22530 Huynh-Le
- 4143 Huziak
- 12124 Hvar
- 1678 Hveen
- 3980 Hviezdoslav
- 24844 Hwanginjoon
- 8516 Hyakkai
- 15740 Hyakumangoku
- 100433 Hyakusyuko
- 7291 Hyakutake
- 221628 Hyatt
- 430 Hybris
- 22857 Hyde
- 14605 Hyeyeonchoi
- 10 Hygiea
- 12155 Hyginus
- 27433 Hylak
- 32152 Hyland
- 10370 Hylonome
- 1842 Hynek
- 23562 Hyodokenichi
- 6879 Hyogo
- 8552 Hyoichi
- 23733 Hyojiyun
- 238 Hypatia
- 15502 Hypeirochus
- 1309 Hyperborea
- 18228 Hyperenor
- 216368 Hypnomys
- 14827 Hypnos
- 7352 Hypsenor
- 587 Hypsipyle
- 9590 Hyria
- 6210 Hyunseop
back to top

== See also ==
- List of minor planet discoverers
- List of observatory codes
- Meanings of minor planet names § Index
