= Halleria =

Halleria may refer to:

- 1308 Halleria, an asteroid
- Halleria (plant), a plant genus
- Halleria, a genus of mites, now treated as a synonym of Freyana
