= Oriola =

Oriola may stand for:

- Oriola (grape), another name for the French wine grape Uva Rara
- Orihuela or Oriola, a city in the province of Alicante, Spain
- Oriola (Portugal), a parish in the municipality of Portel, Portugal
- 701 Oriola, an asteroid discovered by Joseph Helffrich
- Bukola Oriola (born 1976), Nigerian American journalist
- Christian D'Oriola (1928–2007), French foil fencer
- Oriola Marashi (born 1996), Albanian fashion model and singer
