= 2005 Hencke =

Main-belt asteroid

Discovery
- Discovered by: P. Wild
- Discovery site: Zimmerwald Obs.
- Discovery date: 2 September 1973

Designations
- Named after: Karl Ludwig Hencke (German astronomer)
- Alternative designations: 1973 RA
- Minor planet category: main-belt · Eunomia

Orbital characteristics
- Epoch 4 September 2017 (JD 2458000.5)
- Uncertainty parameter 0
- Observation arc: 43.26 yr (15,802 days)
- Aphelion: 3.0590 AU
- Perihelion: 2.1826 AU
- Semi-major axis: 2.6208 AU
- Eccentricity: 0.1672
- Orbital period (sidereal): 4.24 yr (1,550 days)
- Mean anomaly: 91.087°
- Mean motion: 0° 13^{m} 56.28^{s} / day
- Inclination: 12.220°
- Longitude of ascending node: 291.09°
- Argument of perihelion: 110.87°

Physical characteristics
- Dimensions: 9.369±0.174 km 10.53 km (calculated)
- Synodic rotation period: 10.186±0.006 h
- Geometric albedo: 0.21 (assumed); 0.265±0.023
- Spectral type: S
- Absolute magnitude (H): 12.2 · 12.40±0.32

2005 Hencke, provisional designation 1973 RA, is a stony Eunomia asteroid from the middle region of the asteroid belt, approximately 10 kilometers in diameter. It was discovered by Swiss astronomer Paul Wild at Zimmerwald Observatory near Bern, Switzerland, on 2 September 1973. The asteroid was named after German amateur astronomer Karl Ludwig Hencke.

== Orbit and classification ==
The asteroid is a member of the Eunomia family, a large group of S-type asteroids and the most prominent family in the intermediate main-belt. It orbits the Sun in the central main-belt at a distance of 2.2–3.1 AU once every 4 years and 3 months (1,550 days). Its orbit has an eccentricity of 0.17 and an inclination of 12° with respect to the ecliptic. As no precoveries were taken, the asteroid's observation arc begins with its discovery in 1973.

== Physical characteristics ==
=== Rotation period ===
In October 2007, a rotational lightcurve was obtained for this asteroid from photometric observations taken by U.S. astronomer James W. Brinsfield at the Via Capote Observatory in Thousand Oaks, California (G69). The lightcurve gave a rotation period of 10.186±0.006 hours with a brightness amplitude of 0.08 in magnitude (U=2).

=== Diameter and albedo ===
According to the survey carried out by the NEOWISE mission of NASA's Wide-field Infrared Survey Explorer, the asteroid measures 9.4 kilometers in diameter and its surface has an albedo of 0.27, while the Collaborative Asteroid Lightcurve Link assumes an albedo of 0.21, derived from the family's largest member and namesake, 15 Eunomia, and calculates a diameter of 10.5 kilometers.

== Naming ==
This minor planet was named in honor of German amateur astronomer Karl Ludwig Hencke (1793–1866), a postmaster by profession, who discovered the main-belt asteroids 5 Astraea and 6 Hebe in 1845 and 1847, respectively. The official naming citation was published by the Minor Planet Center on 15 October 1977 (M.P.C. 4238).
