= Joseph Helffrich =

German astronomer

Asteroids discovered: 13
697 Galilea	February 14, 1910
698 Ernestina	March 5, 1910
699 Hela	June 5, 1910
700 Auravictrix	June 5, 1910
701 Oriola	July 12, 1910
702 Alauda	July 16, 1910
706 Hirundo	October 9, 1910
708 Raphaela	February 3, 1911
709 Fringilla	February 3, 1911
713 Luscinia	April 18, 1911
714 Ulula	May 18, 1911
2056 Nancy	October 15, 1909
3861 Lorenz	March 30, 1910

Joseph Helffrich (12 January 1890 in Mannheim, Baden – 1971) was a German astronomer.

He did his Ph.D. dissertation in 1913 at the Landessternwarte Heidelberg-Königstuhl (Königstuhl Observatory, near Heidelberg) at the University of Heidelberg .

At the time, the observatory at Heidelberg was a center for asteroid discovery under the direction of Max Wolf, and during his time there Helffrich discovered a number of asteroids.
