= Karl Ludwig Hencke =

German astronomer (1793–1866)

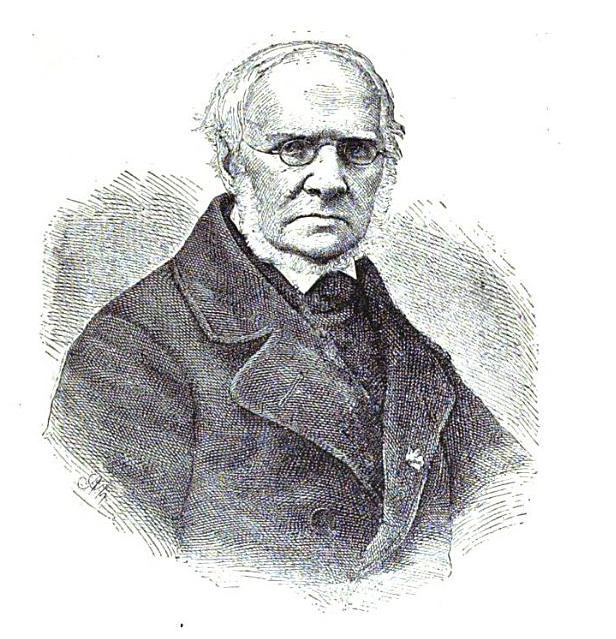
- Born: 8 April 1793; Driesen, Brandenburg (now Drezdenko, Poland)
- Died: 21 September 1866 (aged 73); Marienwerder, Prussia (now Kwidzyn)
- Known for: discovering minor planets

Karl Ludwig Hencke (8 April 1793 – 21 September 1866) was a German amateur astronomer and discoverer of minor planets. He is sometimes confused with Johann Franz Encke, another German astronomer.

== Biography ==
Hencke was born in Driesen, Brandenburg (later Drezdenko, Poland). He volunteered in the Wars of Liberation (Befreiungskriege) for Prussia and was wounded at Lützen. Thereafter he served as post official at various places and finally was elected post master. After his retirement at age 45 for health reasons he lived in his city of birth where he served as city court judge.

He discovered two asteroids from his private observatory at #9, Kietz (later #43, Kietzerstraße), Driesen, by comparing star maps with the sky seen through his telescope. The first, 5 Astraea, was the first asteroid discovered after the long gap that followed 4 Vesta, which was discovered in 1807. Other astronomers had abandoned their searches for more asteroids, convinced that there were only four. However, Hencke began searching in 1830, and fifteen years later met with success. Two years later he discovered his second asteroid 6 Hebe. He also worked on the improvement of star maps.

He died at the age of 73 in the Prussian town of Marienwerder. The asteroid 2005 Hencke – a main-belt asteroid of the Eunomia family, discovered by Swiss astronomer Paul Wild in 1973, was named in his memory (M.P.C. 4238).

Asteroids discovered: 2
5 Astraea	8 December 1845
6 Hebe	1 July 1847
