= 709 Fringilla =

Main-belt asteroid

Discovery
- Discovered by: J. Helffrich
- Discovery site: Heidelberg Obs.
- Discovery date: 3 February 1911

Designations
- Pronunciation: /frɪnˈdʒɪlə/
- Alternative designations: 1911 LK

Orbital characteristics
- Epoch 31 July 2016 (JD 2457600.5)
- Uncertainty parameter 0
- Observation arc: 110.15 yr (40234 d)
- Aphelion: 3.2439 AU (485.28 Gm)
- Perihelion: 2.5923 AU (387.80 Gm)
- Semi-major axis: 2.9181 AU (436.54 Gm)
- Eccentricity: 0.11165
- Orbital period (sidereal): 4.98 yr (1820.7 d)
- Mean anomaly: 215.54°
- Mean motion: 0° 11^{m} 51.792^{s} / day
- Inclination: 16.267°
- Longitude of ascending node: 324.454°
- Argument of perihelion: 18.534°

Physical characteristics
- Mean radius: 48.28±1.7 km
- Mass: (1.51±0.36)×10^{18} kg (Note: Calculated from its standard gravitational parameter GM = 0.101±0.024 km^{3}/s^{2}.)
- Mean density: 3.35 g/cm^{3} (Note: Assuming a diameter of 95.2 km.)
- Synodic rotation period: 52.4 h (2.18 d)
- Geometric albedo: 0.0459±0.003
- Absolute magnitude (H): 9.04

709 Fringilla is a minor planet orbiting the Sun, it is named after the bird genus Fringilla.
