= 700 Auravictrix =

Main-belt asteroid

Discovery
- Discovered by: J. Helffrich
- Discovery site: Heidelberg
- Discovery date: 5 June 1910

Designations
- Pronunciation: /ɔːrəˈvɪktrɪks/
- Alternative designations: 1910 KE; A893 FB; 1951 VE

Orbital characteristics
- Epoch 31 July 2016 (JD 2457600.5)
- Uncertainty parameter 0
- Observation arc: 105.84 yr (38657 d)
- Aphelion: 2.4617 AU (368.27 Gm)
- Perihelion: 1.9979 AU (298.88 Gm)
- Semi-major axis: 2.2298 AU (333.57 Gm)
- Eccentricity: 0.10399
- Orbital period (sidereal): 3.33 yr (1216.2 d)
- Mean anomaly: 2.54071°
- Mean motion: 0° 17^{m} 45.636^{s} / day
- Inclination: 6.7892°
- Longitude of ascending node: 96.829°
- Argument of perihelion: 101.737°

Physical characteristics
- Mean radius: 7.72±0.45 km
- Synodic rotation period: 6.075 ± 0.001 h (0.2531 ± 4.167×10^{−5} d)
- Geometric albedo: 0.2455±0.031
- Absolute magnitude (H): 11.1

700 Auravictrix is an asteroid belonging to the Flora family in the Main Belt. Its diameter is about 15 km and it has an albedo of 0.246. Its rotation period is 6.075 hours.
