= 695 Bella =

Main-belt asteroid

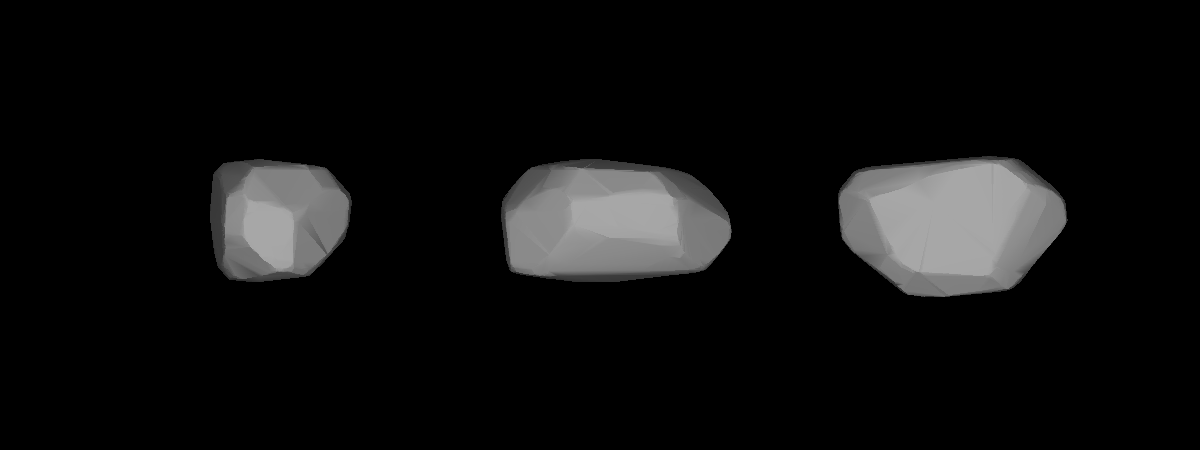
- A three-dimensional model of 695 Bella based on its light curve

Discovery
- Discovered by: Joel Hastings Metcalf
- Discovery site: Taunton, Massachusetts
- Discovery date: 7 November 1909

Designations
- Alternative designations: 1909 JB

Orbital characteristics
- Epoch 31 July 2016 (JD 2457600.5)
- Uncertainty parameter 0
- Observation arc: 102.48 yr (37432 d)
- Aphelion: 2.9457 AU (440.67 Gm)
- Perihelion: 2.1375 AU (319.77 Gm)
- Semi-major axis: 2.5416 AU (380.22 Gm)
- Eccentricity: 0.15900
- Orbital period (sidereal): 4.05 yr (1480.0 d)
- Mean anomaly: 183.825°
- Mean motion: 0° 14^{m} 35.7^{s} / day
- Inclination: 13.838°
- Longitude of ascending node: 275.632°
- Argument of perihelion: 79.589°

Physical characteristics
- Mean radius: 24.09±0.75 km
- Synodic rotation period: 14.222 h (0.5926 d)
- Geometric albedo: 0.1450±0.009
- Absolute magnitude (H): 9.30

695 Bella is a minor planet orbiting the Sun.

Although this asteroid has dynamic properties that make it a candidate for the Maria family, the spectral properties of the object indicate it is most likely an interloper. Instead, it may have been spalled off from 6 Hebe or its parent body. 695 Bella and 6 Hebe orbit on opposite sides of the 3:1 Kirkwood gap, and the two have similar orbital elements.
