= 697 Galilea =

Main-belt asteroid

Discovery
- Discovered by: J. Helffrich
- Discovery site: Heidelberg
- Discovery date: 14 February 1910

Designations
- Pronunciation: /ɡælɪˈliːə/
- Alternative designations: 1910 JO

Orbital characteristics
- Epoch 31 July 2016 (JD 2457600.5)
- Uncertainty parameter 0
- Observation arc: 106.00 yr (38717 d)
- Aphelion: 3.3305 AU (498.24 Gm)
- Perihelion: 2.4292 AU (363.40 Gm)
- Semi-major axis: 2.8799 AU (430.83 Gm)
- Eccentricity: 0.15648
- Orbital period (sidereal): 4.89 yr (1785.1 d)
- Mean anomaly: 62.6388°
- Mean motion: 0° 12^{m} 6.012^{s} / day
- Inclination: 15.143°
- Longitude of ascending node: 15.542°
- Argument of perihelion: 333.222°

Physical characteristics
- Mean radius: 40.07±0.85 km
- Synodic rotation period: 16.538 h (0.6891 d)
- Geometric albedo: 0.0387±0.002
- Absolute magnitude (H): 9.63

697 Galilea is a minor planet orbiting the Sun. It was named in honor of Galileo Galilei, as it was discovered just after the 300th anniversary of his discovery of the Galilean moons.
