= 714 Ulula =

Main-belt asteroid

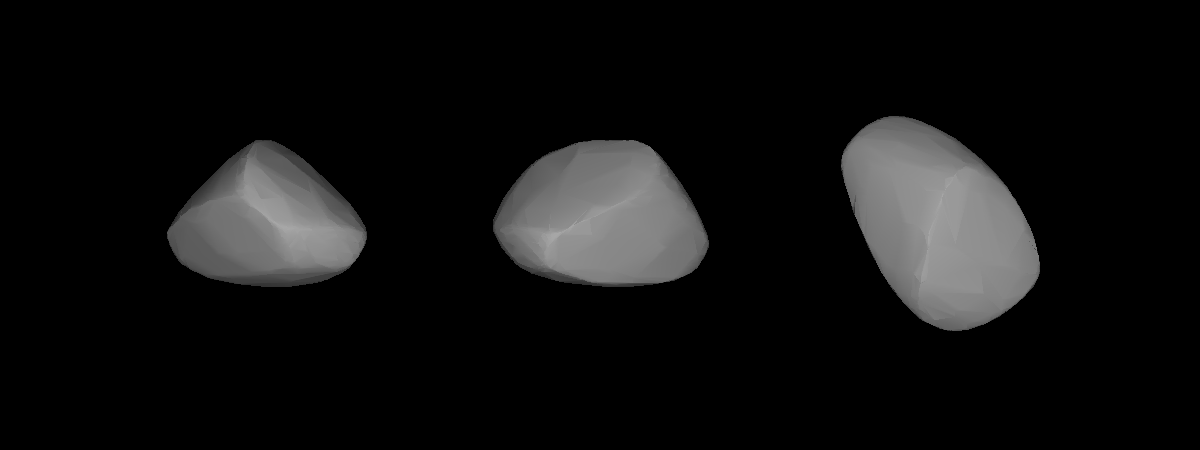
- A three-dimensional model of 714 Ulula based on its light curve

Discovery
- Discovered by: J. Helffrich
- Discovery site: Heidelberg Obs.
- Discovery date: 18 May 1911

Designations
- Pronunciation: /ˈʌljʊlə/
- Alternative designations: 1911 LW

Orbital characteristics
- Epoch 31 July 2016 (JD 2457600.5)
- Uncertainty parameter 0
- Observation arc: 104.92 yr (38323 d)
- Aphelion: 2.6801 AU (400.94 Gm)
- Perihelion: 2.3892 AU (357.42 Gm)
- Semi-major axis: 2.5347 AU (379.19 Gm)
- Eccentricity: 0.057381
- Orbital period (sidereal): 4.04 yr (1474.0 d)
- Mean anomaly: 128.475°
- Mean motion: 0° 14^{m} 39.264^{s} / day
- Inclination: 14.271°
- Longitude of ascending node: 233.847°
- Argument of perihelion: 232.003°

Physical characteristics
- Mean radius: 19.59±1.2 km
- Synodic rotation period: 6.998 h (0.2916 d)
- Geometric albedo: 0.2711±0.037
- Absolute magnitude (H): 9.1

714 Ulula is a main belt asteroid. It is orbiting the Sun near the 3:1 Kirkwood Gap with a period of 4.04 years and an eccentricity of 0.057. It was discovered by German astronomer J. Helffrich on 18 May 1911 from the Heidelberg Observatory and was named after an order of owls. The asteroid has a mean radius of 20 km and is spinning with a rotation period of seven hours. Its pole of rotation lies just 4–14° away from the plane of the ecliptic. The surface spectrum shows a pyroxene chemistry and is consistent with mesosiderites/HED meteorites.
