= List of former planets =

This is a list of astronomical objects formerly widely considered planets under any of the various definitions of this word in the history of astronomy. As the definition of planet has evolved, the de facto and de jure definitions of planet have changed over the millennia. As of 2024, there are eight official planets in the Solar System per the International Astronomical Union (IAU), which has also established a definition for exoplanets. Several objects formerly considered exoplanets have been found actually to be stars or brown dwarfs.

== Background ==
Throughout antiquity, several astronomical objects were considered classical planets, meaning "wandering stars", not all of which are now considered planets. The moons discovered around Jupiter, Saturn and Uranus after the advent of the telescope were also initially considered planets by some. The development of more powerful telescopes resulted in the discovery of the asteroids, which were initially considered planets. Then Pluto, the first trans-Neptunian object, was discovered. More trans-Neptunian objects of the Kuiper belt were found with the help of electronic imaging. One of these, Eris, was widely hailed as a "new planet", which prompted the 2006 recategorization of Solar System bodies.

Some planetary scientists reject the 2006 definition of planet, and thus would still consider some of the objects on this list to be planets under a geophysical definition. See the list of gravitationally rounded objects of the Solar System for a list of geophysical planets.

== List ==
Former planets of the Solar System
| Astrological and astronomical symbol | Former planet | Discovery | Removal | Current status | Images | Notes | references |
|---|---|---|---|---|---|---|---|
| | The Morning Star | Antiquity | Antiquity | Aspects of Venus | | "Phosphorus", the Morning Star of Greek antiquity (Eosphorus, the Dawn-Bringer; called "Lucifer" by the Romans), and "Hesperus", the Evening Star (called "Vesper" by the Romans), were later identified as a single planet, Venus (Aphrodite). | |
| | The Evening Star | Antiquity | Antiquity | Aspects of Venus | | "Phosphorus", the Morning Star of Greek antiquity (Eosphorus, the Dawn-Bringer; called "Lucifer" by the Romans), and "Hesperus", the Evening Star (called "Vesper" by the Romans), were later identified as a single planet, Venus (Aphrodite). | |
| | Apollo | Antiquity | 400s BC | Aspect of Mercury | | Like the Morning and Evening Stars, Mercury was deemed to be a distinct planet when it was visible during daytime, and dedicated to Apollo by the Greeks. Eventually, in the 4th century BC, Mercury and Apollo were found to be one and the same. | |
| ☉ | Sun | Antiquity | 1543 | Star | | In antiquity, it was believed that the Sun and all the planets orbited the Earth. Thus the Sun was categorised as a planet. Following the acceptance of the Copernican model, it was recognized that the planets (including Earth) orbit the Sun, and it was no longer regarded as a planet. Subsequent discoveries showed that the Sun is a star. | |
| ☾ | Moon | Antiquity | 1543 | Moon of Earth | | Following the acceptance of the Copernican model, planets were defined as objects which orbit the Sun. Since the Moon can be said to orbit the Earth, it was no longer regarded as a planet, but this is debated; see double planet. | |
| | Io | 1610 | 1700s | Moons of Jupiter | | Originally presented as satellite planets orbiting the planet Jupiter. Planetary status later rescinded, leaving them only as satellites. Ganymede is the largest satellite in the Solar System, and is slightly larger than Mercury, but is about half as massive. | |
| | Europa | 1610 | 1700s | Moons of Jupiter | | Originally presented as satellite planets orbiting the planet Jupiter. Planetary status later rescinded, leaving them only as satellites. Ganymede is the largest satellite in the Solar System, and is slightly larger than Mercury, but is about half as massive. | |
| | Ganymede | 1610 | 1700s | Moons of Jupiter | | Originally presented as satellite planets orbiting the planet Jupiter. Planetary status later rescinded, leaving them only as satellites. Ganymede is the largest satellite in the Solar System, and is slightly larger than Mercury, but is about half as massive. | |
| | Callisto | 1610 | 1700s | Moons of Jupiter | | Originally presented as satellite planets orbiting the planet Jupiter. Planetary status later rescinded, leaving them only as satellites. Ganymede is the largest satellite in the Solar System, and is slightly larger than Mercury, but is about half as massive. | |
| | Titan | 1656 | 1700s | Moons of Saturn | | Originally presented as satellite planets orbiting the planet Saturn. Planetary status later rescinded, leaving them only as satellites. Titan is the second largest satellite in the Solar System, and is slightly larger than Mercury, but less massive. | |
| | Iapetus | 1671 | 1700s | Moons of Saturn | | Originally presented as satellite planets orbiting the planet Saturn. Planetary status later rescinded, leaving them only as satellites. Titan is the second largest satellite in the Solar System, and is slightly larger than Mercury, but less massive. | |
| | Rhea | 1672 | 1700s | Moons of Saturn | | Originally presented as satellite planets orbiting the planet Saturn. Planetary status later rescinded, leaving them only as satellites. Titan is the second largest satellite in the Solar System, and is slightly larger than Mercury, but less massive. | |
| | Tethys | 1684 | 1700s | Moons of Saturn | | Originally presented as satellite planets orbiting the planet Saturn. Planetary status later rescinded, leaving them only as satellites. Titan is the second largest satellite in the Solar System, and is slightly larger than Mercury, but less massive. | |
| | Dione | 1684 | 1700s | Moons of Saturn | | Originally presented as satellite planets orbiting the planet Saturn. Planetary status later rescinded, leaving them only as satellites. Titan is the second largest satellite in the Solar System, and is slightly larger than Mercury, but less massive. | |
| | Titania | 1787 | 1700s | Moons of Uranus | | Originally presented as satellite planets orbiting the planet Uranus. Planetary status later rescinded, leaving them only as satellites. | |
| | Oberon | 1787 | 1700s | Moons of Uranus | | Originally presented as satellite planets orbiting the planet Uranus. Planetary status later rescinded, leaving them only as satellites. | |
| ⚳ | Ceres | 1801 | 1867 | Asteroid and dwarf planet | | The first asteroids to be discovered were accepted as planets in the Copernican system, since they directly orbited the Sun. By 1855 the number of known bodies in the asteroid belt had grown to 15, at which point astronomers started distinguishing these from the eight known major planets. The 1867 edition of Berliner Astronomisches Jahrbuch placed all the new bodies in the asteroid belt into a separate category as 'minor planets' or 'asteroids', by which point almost 100 asteroids had been observed. | |
| ⚴ | Pallas | 1802 | 1867 | Asteroid | | | |
| ⚵ | Juno | 1804 | 1867 | Asteroid | | | |
| | Vesta | 1807 | 1867 | Asteroid | | | |
| | Astraea | 1845 | 1867 | Asteroid | | | |
| | Hebe | 1847 | 1867 | Asteroid | | | |
| | Iris | 1847 | 1867 | Asteroid | | | |
| ⚷ | Chiron | 1977 | 1980 | Centaur | | The discovery of Chiron was hailed by the press and astrologers as that of a new planet. Astronomically, it was different from any other planets, asteroids and comets known at the time, and it was classified as unique at that time. Later it was called an asteroid, and then was found to exhibit characteristics of a comet, leading to multiple classifications. Later it was placed into its own category of centaurs, and many other centaurs have been discovered subsequently. | |
| ♇ ⯓ | Pluto | 1930 | 2006 | Dwarf planet | | Following its discovery in 1930, Pluto was considered the ninth planet. Numerous scientific discoveries in the 1990s and early 2000s placed doubt on this classification, and after the discovery of Eris, which was thought to be larger than Pluto, the International Astronomical Union met to determine a definition of a planet. Like the asteroids before them, Pluto was grouped with Eris and similar bodies as members of a group of smaller objects designated as dwarf planets. | |
| ⯕ | Charon | 1978 | 2006 | Moon of Pluto | | When discovered, Charon, the moon of Pluto, was found to be very large, leading to the declaration by many that the Pluto-Charon system was a double planet (binary planet). The 2006 IAU redefinition of planet excludes the possibility of double planets. | |
| | 15760 Albion | 1992 | unknown | Trans-Neptunian object | | When discovered, these bodies were briefly hailed as the tenth and eleventh planets by the press, but it was then decided that 15760 Albion was the prototype of trans-Neptunian objects or cubewanos. | |
| | (181708) 1993 FW | 1992 | unknown | Trans-Neptunian object | | When discovered, these bodies were briefly hailed as the tenth and eleventh planets by the press, but it was then decided that 15760 Albion was the prototype of trans-Neptunian objects or cubewanos. | |
| ⯰ | Eris | 2005 | 2006 | Dwarf planet | | The discovery of Eris, hailed worldwide by the press as the tenth planet, prompted the International Astronomical Union to meet and establish a new definition of planet. It was recategorised as a dwarf planet, together with Pluto and numerous other objects. | |

== See also ==
- List of gravitationally rounded objects of the Solar System
- List of possible dwarf planets
- List of hypothetical Solar System objects
