= 698 Ernestina =

Background asteroid

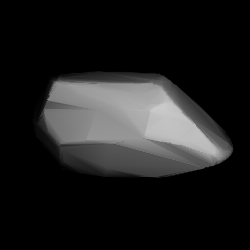
- Modelled shape of Ernestina from its lightcurve

Discovery
- Discovered by: J. Helffrich
- Discovery site: Heidelberg Obs.
- Discovery date: 5 March 1910

Designations
- Named after: Ernst Wolf (son of Max Wolf)
- Alternative designations: A910 ED · A908 WB; 1910 JX
- Minor planet category: main-belt · (outer) background

Orbital characteristics
- Epoch 31 May 2020 (JD 2459000.5)
- Uncertainty parameter 0
- Observation arc: 111.16 yr (40,601 d)
- Aphelion: 3.1847 AU
- Perihelion: 2.5490 AU
- Semi-major axis: 2.8669 AU
- Eccentricity: 0.1109
- Orbital period (sidereal): 4.85 yr (1,773 d)
- Mean anomaly: 269.92°
- Mean motion: 0° 12^{m} 10.8^{s} / day
- Inclination: 11.532°
- Longitude of ascending node: 40.630°
- Argument of perihelion: 98.687°

Physical characteristics
- Mean diameter: 26.74±0.63 km; 27.03±1.2 km; 29.804±0.438 km
- Synodic rotation period: 5.0363±0.0005 h
- Pole ecliptic latitude: (213.0°, −66.0°) (λ_{1}/β_{1}); (76.0°, −49.0°) (λ_{2}/β_{2})
- Geometric albedo: 0.095±0.016; 0.1269±0.012; 0.130±0.007
- Spectral type: C (assumed); Cgx, undef. (MOVIS)
- Absolute magnitude (H): 10.70; 10.80; 10.9

698 Ernestina (prov. designation: A910 ED or 1910 JX) is a background asteroid, approximately 27 kilometers (17 miles) in diameter, located in the outer regions of the asteroid belt. It was discovered on 5 March 1910, by German astronomer Joseph Helffrich at the Heidelberg-Königstuhl State Observatory. The presumed carbonaceous C-type asteroid has a rotation period of 5.0 hours. It was named after Ernst Wolf, son of German astronomer and prolific discoverer of minor planets, Max Wolf.

== Orbit and classification ==
Ernestina is a non-family asteroid of the main belt's background population when applying the hierarchical clustering method to its proper orbital elements. It orbits the Sun in the outer asteroid belt at a distance of 2.5–3.2 AU once every 4 years and 10 months (1,773 days; semi-major axis of 2.87 AU). Its orbit has an eccentricity of 0.11 and an inclination of 12° with respect to the ecliptic. The asteroid was first observed as 1908 WB at Heidelberg Observatory on 28 November 1908. The body's observation arc begins with its official discovery observation on 5 March 1910.

== Naming ==
This minor planet was named after Ernst Wolf, son of German astronomer Max Wolf (1863–1932), who has discovered many asteroids at Heidelberg including some of the first near-Earth objects and Jupiter trojans. The naming citation was mentioned in The Names of the Minor Planets by Paul Herget in 1955 (H 71).

== Physical characteristics ==
Ernestina is an assumed carbonaceous C-type asteroid. In a taxonomic classification based on MOVIS near-infrared colors, the asteroid's preliminary determined Cgx-type was ultimately rejected and its final class changed to "undefined" (U). MOVIS data has been obtained by the VISTA Hemisphere Survey using the VISTA telescope at Paranal Observatory in Chile.

=== Rotation period ===
In October 2005, a rotational lightcurve of Ernestina was obtained from photometric observations by an international collaboration led by Donald Pray at Carbuncle Hill Observatory (912). Lightcurve analysis gave a well-defined rotation period of 5.0363±0.0005 hours with a brightness variation of 0.30±0.02 magnitude (U=3). Alternative period determinations in ascending order include: 5.00±0.05 h by Gordana Apostolovska in 2011 (U=2), 5.03654±0.00004 h by Laurent Bernasconi in 2002 (U=3), 5.037±0.0008 h by astronomers at the Palomar Transient Factory in 2010 (U=2), 5.0415±0.0006 h by René Roy in 2017 (U=3), 5.0431±0.0002 h by David Polishook in 2005 (U=3), and 5.07 h by Violeta Ivanova in 2002 (U=3).

=== Poles ===
Two lightcurves, published in 2016, using modeled photometric data from the Lowell Photometric Database (LPD) and other sources, gave a concurring sidereal period of (5.03660±0.00005) and (5.03661±0.00001) hours, respectively. Each modeled lightcurve also determined two spin axes of (213.0°, −66.0°) and (76.0°, −49.0°), as well as (282.0°, −79.0°) and (114.0°, −45.0°) in ecliptic coordinates (λ, β), respectively.

=== Diameter and albedo ===
According to the surveys carried out by the Japanese Akari satellite, the Infrared Astronomical Satellite IRAS and the NEOWISE mission of NASA's Wide-field Infrared Survey Explorer (WISE), Ernestina measures (26.74±0.63), (27.03±1.2) and (29.804±0.438) kilometers in diameter and its surface has an albedo of (0.130±0.007), (0.1269±0.012) and (0.095±0.016), respectively. The Collaborative Asteroid Lightcurve Link derives an albedo of 0.1064 and a diameter of 26.92 kilometers based on an absolute magnitude of 10.9. The WISE team also published an alternative mean-diameter (27.037±0.242 km) and an albedo of (0.116±0.022).
