= 2056 Nancy =

Main-belt asteroid

Discovery
- Discovered by: J. Helffrich
- Discovery site: Heidelberg Obs.
- Discovery date: 15 October 1909

Designations
- Named after: Nancy Lou Zissell Marsden (wife of Brian G. Marsden)
- Alternative designations: 1909 TB · 1929 VQ; 1942 RA_{1} · 1962 XE; 1972 VC_{1} · 1974 HL_{2}
- Minor planet category: main-belt · (inner) background

Orbital characteristics
- Epoch 23 March 2018 (JD 2458200.5)
- Uncertainty parameter 0
- Observation arc: 108.60 yr (39,665 d)
- Aphelion: 2.5253 AU
- Perihelion: 1.9098 AU
- Semi-major axis: 2.2175 AU
- Eccentricity: 0.1388
- Orbital period (sidereal): 3.30 yr (1,206 d)
- Mean anomaly: 303.73°
- Mean motion: 0° 17^{m} 54.6^{s} / day
- Inclination: 3.9361°
- Longitude of ascending node: 225.77°
- Argument of perihelion: 145.80°

Physical characteristics
- Mean diameter: 7.783±0.150 km 8.227±0.085 km 10.30 km (calculated); 11.19±2.42 km
- Synodic rotation period: 15.0 h (Note: Anonymous lightcurve: rotation period 15.0 hours with a brightness amplitude of 0.08 mag. Summary figures for (2056) Nancy at Collaborative Asteroid Lightcurve Link (CALL).)
- Geometric albedo: 0.16±0.08; 0.20 (assumed); 0.3164±0.0387; 0.351±0.056
- Spectral type: SMASS = S
- Absolute magnitude (H): 12.3; 12.62

2056 Nancy (provisional designation 1909 TB) is a stony background asteroid from the inner regions of the asteroid belt, approximately 10 kilometers (6 miles) in diameter. It was discovered on 15 October 1909, by German astronomer Joseph Helffrich at Heidelberg Observatory in southwest Germany. The S-type asteroid has a tentative rotation period of 15.0 hours. It was named for Nancy Marsden, wife of British astronomer Brian G. Marsden.

== Orbit and classification ==
Nancy is a non-family asteroid of the main belt's background population. It orbits the Sun in the inner asteroid belt at a distance of 1.9–2.5 AU once every 3 years and 4 months (1,206 days; semi-major axis of 2.22 AU). Its orbit has an eccentricity of 0.14 and an inclination of 4° with respect to the ecliptic. The asteroid's observation arc begins with its official discovery observation at Heidelberg in October 1909.

== Naming ==
This minor planet was named after Nancy Lou Zissell Marsden, wife of British astronomer Brian G. Marsden, who established the asteroid's identification, and after whom another minor planet, 1877 Marsden, was previously named. The official naming citation was published by the Minor Planet Center on 1 April 1978 (M.P.C. 4359).

== Physical characteristics ==
Nancy is a common S-type asteroid in the SMASS classification.

=== Lightcurves ===
As of 2018, only a single fragmentary lightcurve of Nancy has been obtained from photometric observation. Analysis of the rotational lightcurve gives a period of 15 hours with a brightness variation of 0.08 magnitude (U=1).

=== Diameter and albedo ===
According to the survey carried out by the NEOWISE mission of NASA's Wide-field Infrared Survey Explorer, Nancy measures between 7.783 and 11.19 kilometers in diameter and its surface has an albedo between 0.16 and 0.351. The Collaborative Asteroid Lightcurve Link assumes a standard albedo for stony asteroids of 0.20 and calculates a diameter of 10.30 kilometers based on an absolute magnitude of 12.3.
