= Freyanidae =

Scientific classification
- Kingdom: Animalia
- Phylum: Arthropoda
- Subphylum: Chelicerata
- Class: Arachnida
- Order: Sarcoptiformes
- Parvorder: Psoroptidia
- Family: Freyanidae

Family of mites

Freyanidae is a family of feather mites in the order Astigmata. There are more than 15 genera in Freyanidae.

== Genera ==
These genera belong to the family Freyanidae:

- Allofreyana Gaud and Atyeo, 1975
- Burhinacarus, Dubinin, 1956
- Cauralicola Gaud & Atyeo, 1981
- Cernyella, Gaud, 1968
- Diomedacarinae Gaud & Atyeo, 1981
- Diomedacarus, Dubinin, 1949
- Dobyella Gaud et Atyeo, 1975
- Freyana Haller, 1877
- Freyanomorpha, Gaud, 1957
- Freyanopsis Dubinin, 1950
- Michaelia Trouessart, 1884
- Morinyssus Gaud & Atyeo, 1982
- Parafreyana Cerny, 1969
- Pavlovskiana Dubinin, 1950
- Pelecymerus Gaud and Atyeo, 1975
- Sulanyssus Dubinin, 1953
