= 1844 Susilva =

Stony Eoan asteroid

Discovery
- Discovered by: P. Wild
- Discovery site: Zimmerwald Obs.
- Discovery date: 30 October 1972

Designations
- Named after: Susi Petit–Pierre (friend of discoverer)
- Alternative designations: 1972 UB · 1943 EU; 1953 AA · 1959 GJ
- Minor planet category: main-belt · Eos

Orbital characteristics
- Epoch 4 September 2017 (JD 2458000.5)
- Uncertainty parameter 0
- Observation arc: 64.40 yr (23,521 days)
- Aphelion: 3.1714 AU
- Perihelion: 2.8587 AU
- Semi-major axis: 3.0150 AU
- Eccentricity: 0.0518
- Orbital period (sidereal): 5.24 yr (1,912 days)
- Mean anomaly: 70.711°
- Mean motion: 0° 11^{m} 17.88^{s} / day
- Inclination: 11.788°
- Longitude of ascending node: 99.365°
- Argument of perihelion: 73.564°

Physical characteristics
- Dimensions: 19.022±0.232 km 22.41 km (calculated); 26.800±0.321 km
- Geometric albedo: 0.118±0.011; 0.14 (assumed); 0.2358±0.0545
- Spectral type: S
- Absolute magnitude (H): 10.8 · 11.0 · 11.49±0.44

1844 Susilva, provisional designation 1972 UB, is a stony Eoan asteroid from the outer region of the asteroid belt, approximately 22 kilometers in diameter. It was discovered on 30 October 1972, by Swiss astronomer Paul Wild at Zimmerwald Observatory near Bern, Switzerland, and later named after a schoolfriend of the discoverer.

== Classification and orbit ==
Susilva is a member of the Eos family, a collisional group of more than 4,000 asteroids, which are well known for mostly being of silicaceous composition. It orbits the Sun in the outer main-belt at a distance of 2.9–3.2 AU once every 5 years and 3 months (1,912 days). Its orbit has an eccentricity of 0.05 and an inclination of 12° with respect to the ecliptic. First identified as 1943 EU at Turku Observatory, Susilva's first used observation was taken at Uccle Observatory in 1953, extending the body's observation arc by 19 years prior to its official discovery observation.

== Physical characteristics ==
According to the survey carried out by NASA's Wide-field Infrared Survey Explorer with its subsequent NEOWISE mission, the asteroid measures between 19.0 and 26.8 kilometers in diameter, and its surface has an albedo of 0.118 to 0.236. The Collaborative Asteroid Lightcurve Link assumes an albedo of 0.14, taken from 221 Eos, the family's largest member and namesake – and calculates a diameter of 22.4 kilometers based on an absolute magnitude of 11.0. Susilva's rotation period has not yet been measured.

== Naming ==
The discoverer named a pair of asteroids after two of his former schoolmates, Susi and Helen, both from the small village of Wald, Zürich in Switzerland. This one was dedicated to Susi Petit–Pierre, while the subsequently numbered asteroid, 1845 Helewalda, was given to Helen Gachnang. The official naming citation was published by the Minor Planet Center on 18 April 1977 (M.P.C. 4156).
