= 713 Luscinia =

Main-belt asteroid

Discovery
- Discovered by: J. Helffrich
- Discovery site: Heidelberg Obs.
- Discovery date: 18 April 1911

Designations
- Pronunciation: /luːˈsɪniə/
- Alternative designations: 1911 LS

Orbital characteristics
- Epoch 31 July 2016 (JD 2457600.5)
- Uncertainty parameter 0
- Observation arc: 105.00 yr (38350 d)
- Aphelion: 3.9473 AU (590.51 Gm)
- Perihelion: 2.8350 AU (424.11 Gm)
- Semi-major axis: 3.3912 AU (507.32 Gm)
- Eccentricity: 0.16400
- Orbital period (sidereal): 6.24 yr (2281.0 d)
- Mean anomaly: 133.98°
- Mean motion: 0° 9^{m} 28.188^{s} / day
- Inclination: 10.359°
- Longitude of ascending node: 217.687°
- Argument of perihelion: 137.252°

Physical characteristics
- Mean radius: 52.76±1.55 km
- Mass: (9.0±9.0)×10^{17} kg (Note: Calculated from its standard gravitational parameter GM = 0.06±0.06 km^{3}/s^{2}.) (SB441)
- Mean density: 1.5±1.5 g/cm^{3} (calculated)
- Synodic rotation period: 9.9143 h (0.41310 d)
- Geometric albedo: 0.0410±0.003
- Absolute magnitude (H): 8.97

713 Luscinia is a large, main belt asteroid orbiting the Sun. It is a member of the Cybele asteroid group.
