= 708 Raphaela =

Minor planet orbiting the Sun

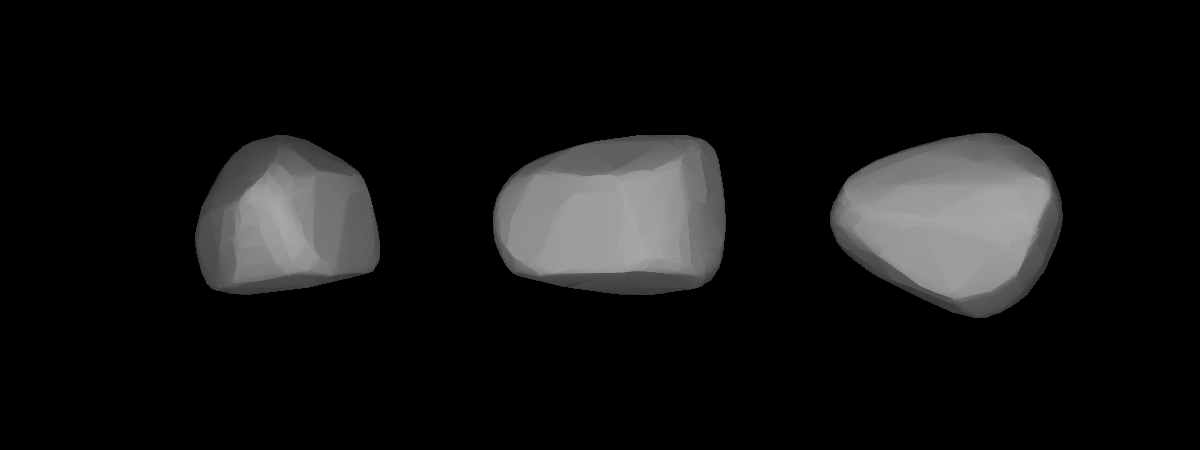
- A three-dimensional model of 708 Raphaela based on its light curve.

Discovery
- Discovered by: J. Helffrich
- Discovery site: Heidelberg
- Discovery date: 3 February 1911

Designations
- Pronunciation: /ræfeɪˈɛlə, -faɪ-/
- Alternative designations: 1911 LJ

Orbital characteristics
- Epoch 31 July 2016 (JD 2457600.5)
- Uncertainty parameter 0
- Observation arc: 123.34 yr (45049 d)
- Aphelion: 2.9024 AU (434.19 Gm)
- Perihelion: 2.4387 AU (364.82 Gm)
- Semi-major axis: 2.6705 AU (399.50 Gm)
- Eccentricity: 0.086818
- Orbital period (sidereal): 4.36 yr (1594.0 d)
- Mean anomaly: 9.02998°
- Mean motion: 0° 13^{m} 33.024^{s} / day
- Inclination: 3.4910°
- Longitude of ascending node: 355.202°
- Argument of perihelion: 197.104°
- Earth MOID: 1.43803 AU (215.126 Gm)
- Jupiter MOID: 2.06007 AU (308.182 Gm)
- T_{Jupiter}: 3.373

Physical characteristics
- Mean radius: 10.715±0.75 km
- Synodic rotation period: 20.918±0.005 h
- Geometric albedo: 0.2193±0.034
- Absolute magnitude (H): 10.61

708 Raphaela is a minor planet orbiting the Sun.

Observations performed at the Palmer Divide Observatory in Colorado Springs, Colorado during 2007 produced a light curve with a period of 20.918 hours with a brightness amplitude of 0.45 ± 0.02 in magnitude.
