= 706 Hirundo =

Elongated background asteroid

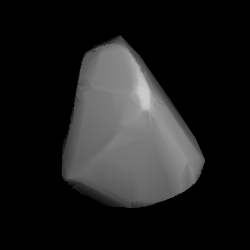
- Modelled shape of Hirundo from its lightcurve

Discovery
- Discovered by: J. Helffrich
- Discovery site: Heidelberg Obs.
- Discovery date: 9 October 1910

Designations
- Pronunciation: /hɪˈrʌndoʊ/
- Named after: Hirundo (swallows) (Genus of birds)
- Alternative designations: A910 TF · 1948 AE; 1957 DA · 1977 QB; A924 WD · 1910 KX
- Minor planet category: main-belt · (middle); background
- Adjectives: Hirundinian /hɪrənˈdɪniən/

Orbital characteristics
- Epoch 31 May 2020 (JD 2459000.5)
- Uncertainty parameter 0
- Observation arc: 109.55 yr (40,014 d)
- Aphelion: 3.2601 AU
- Perihelion: 2.1987 AU
- Semi-major axis: 2.7294 AU
- Eccentricity: 0.1944
- Orbital period (sidereal): 4.51 yr (1,647 d)
- Mean anomaly: 124.52°
- Mean motion: 0° 13^{m} 6.96^{s} / day
- Inclination: 14.431°
- Longitude of ascending node: 325.34°
- Argument of perihelion: 31.090°

Physical characteristics
- Mean diameter: 29.22±1.5 km; 29.36±0.79 km; 30.819±0.553 km
- Mass: (6.3±2.4)×10^{17} kg (Note: Calculated from its standard gravitational parameter GM = 0.042±0.016 km^{3}/s^{2}.)
- Mean density: 41.51 g/cm^{3} (Note: Assuming a diameter of 30.8 km.)
- Synodic rotation period: 22.027±0.005 h (Note: Lightcurve plot of 706 Hirundo, Palmer Divide Observatory (PDO), B. Warner (2000). Rotation period 22.027±0.005 hours with a brightness amplitude of 0.9±0.03 mag. Quality code is 3. Summary figures at the LCDB and PDO websites.)
- Pole ecliptic latitude: (92°, 66°) (λ_{1}/β_{1}); (244°, 54°) (λ_{2}/β_{2})
- Geometric albedo: 0.081±0.011; 0.172±0.011; 0.1721±0.019
- Spectral type: SMASS = Cgh
- Absolute magnitude (H): 10.20; 10.90; 11.0

706 Hirundo (prov. designation: A910 TF or 1910 KX) is an elongated background asteroid, located in the central region of the asteroid belt. It was discovered by German astronomer Joseph Helffrich at the Heidelberg Observatory on 9 October 1910. The carbonaceous C-type asteroid (Cgh) has a rotation period of 22.0 hours and measures approximately 30 kilometers (19 miles) in diameter. It was named after the bird genus Hirundo, commonly known as swallows.

== Orbit and classification ==
Orbit of 706 Hirundo (2000–2020) Earth · Mars · Jupiter

Hirundo is a non-family asteroid of the main belt's background population when applying the hierarchical clustering method to its proper orbital elements.

It orbits the Sun in the central asteroid belt at a distance of 2.2–3.3 AU once every 4 years and 6 months (1,647 days; semi-major axis of 2.73 AU). Its orbit has an eccentricity of 0.19 and an inclination of 14° with respect to the ecliptic. The body's observation arc begins at Vienna Observatory on 16 October 1910, or six nights after its official discovery observation by Joseph Helffrich at Heidelberg.

== Naming ==
This minor planet was named after bird genus Hirundo, a group of passerines in the family Hirundinidae (swallows and martins). "Hirundo" is the Latin word for swallow. The naming citation was mentioned in The Names of the Minor Planets by Paul Herget in 1955 (H 71).

== Physical characteristics ==
In both the Bus–Binzel (SMASS-II) and the Bus–DeMeo classification, Hirundo is a carbonaceous C-type asteroid (Cgh).

=== Rotation period and poles ===
In September 2000, a rotational lightcurve of Hirundo was obtained from photometric observations by American Brian Warner at the Palmer Divide Observatory (716) in Colorado. Lightcurve analysis gave a rotation period of 22.027±0.005 hours with a high brightness variation of 0.9±0.03 magnitude, indicative of an elongated shape (U=3). During the same opposition, Bill Holliday measures a period of (22.00±0.025 h) and an amplitude of (0.75±0.02) magnitude at his River Oaks Observatory (915) in New Braunfels, Texas (U=3). Further observations by René Roy (2011), Patrice Le Guen (2018), and Anaël Wünsche and Raoul Behrend (2020) determined a period of (22.002±0.003 h), (22.0±0.5 h) and (22.00248 h) with an amplitude of (0.39±0.01), (0.68±0.05) and (0.15±0.04) magnitude, respectively (U=3/2/n.a.).

Two lightcurves, published in 2016, using modeled photometric data from the Lowell Photometric Database (LPD) and other sources, gave a concurring period of (22.0160±0.0005) and (22.0161±0.0001) hours, respectively. Each modeled lightcurve also determined two spin axes of (92°, 66°) and (244°, 54°), as well as (91°, 70°) and (250°, 45°) in ecliptic coordinates (λ, β), respectively.

=== Diameter and albedo ===
According to the surveys carried out by the Infrared Astronomical Satellite IRAS, the Japanese Akari satellite and the NEOWISE mission of NASA's Wide-field Infrared Survey Explorer (WISE), Hirundo measures (29.22±1.5), (29.36±0.79) and (30.819±0.553) kilometers in diameter and its surface has an albedo of (0.1721±0.019), (0.172±0.011) and (0.081±0.011), respectively.

The Collaborative Asteroid Lightcurve Link derives an albedo of 0.0853 and a diameter of 28.70 kilometers based on an absolute magnitude of 11. The WISE-team also published two alternative mean-diameters of (24.44±8.42 km) and (24.72±4.69 km) with a corresponding albedos of (0.09±0.07) and (0.09±0.03).
