= 699 Hela =

Mars-crossing asteroid

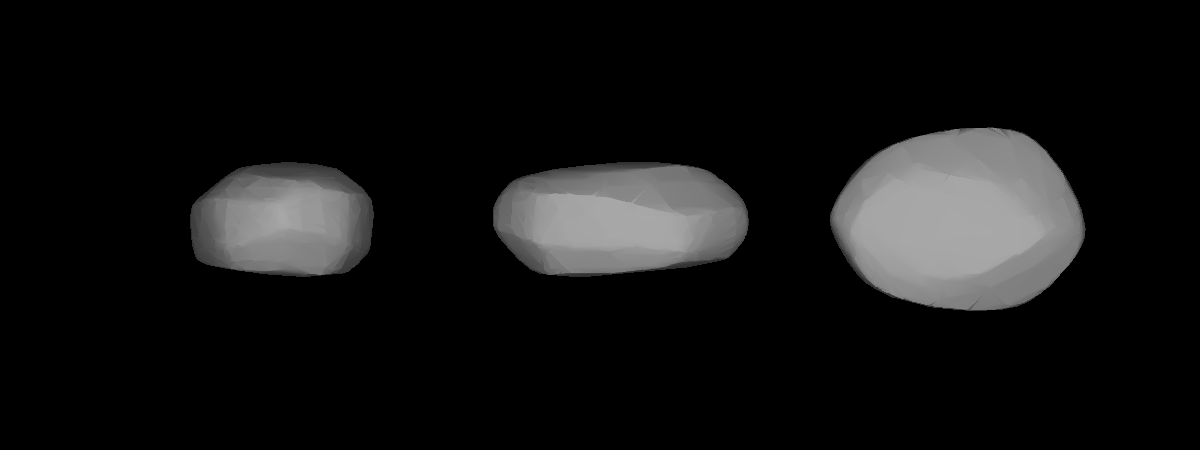
- Lightcurve-based 3D-model of Hela

Discovery
- Discovered by: J. Helffrich
- Discovery site: Heidelberg
- Discovery date: 5 June 1910

Designations
- Pronunciation: /ˈhiːlə/
- Alternative designations: 1902 WE · 1910 LC · 1923 TB · 1948 KD · 1957 WX_{1} (Note: JPL's Small-Body Database (SBDB) Lookup notates Hela's retroactive new-style designations as A902 WE, A910 LC, and A923 TB. Its old-style designations were 1902 KD, 1902 KQ, and 1923 OZ.)
- Minor planet category: Mars crosser

Orbital characteristics
- Epoch 31 July 2016 (JD 2457600.5)
- Uncertainty parameter 0
- Observation arc: 113.38 yr (41,411 d)
- Aphelion: 3.6831 AU (550.98 Gm)
- Perihelion: 1.5414 AU (230.59 Gm)
- Semi-major axis: 2.6123 AU (390.79 Gm)
- Eccentricity: 0.40995
- Orbital period (sidereal): 4.22 yr (1,542.1 d)
- Mean anomaly: 3.93957°
- Mean motion: 0° 14^{m} 0.384^{s} / day
- Inclination: 15.297°
- Longitude of ascending node: 242.548°
- Argument of perihelion: 91.479°
- Earth MOID: 0.62609 AU (93.662 Gm)
- Mars MOID: 0.4063 AU (60.78 Gm)
- Jupiter MOID: 2.10581 AU (315.025 Gm)
- T_{Jupiter}: 3.239

Physical characteristics
- Dimensions: 12–27 km
- Synodic rotation period: 3.3962 h (0.14151 d)
- Absolute magnitude (H): 11.72

699 Hela is a Mars crossing asteroid. It was discovered on 5 June 1910 at Heidelberg Observatory by German astronomer Joseph Helffrich, and may have been named after Hel, the Norse ruler of the underworld. This asteroid is orbiting the Sun at a distance of 2.61 astronomical units (AU) with a period of 4.22 years and an eccentricity of 0.41. The orbital plane is inclined at an angle of 15.3° to the plane of the ecliptic.

== History and naming ==
Hela was discovered on 5 June 1910 in photographs taken by German astronomer Joseph Helffrich on 5–6 June at Heidelberg Observatory. It was reported in the journal Astronomische Nachrichten on 11 June under the old-style provisional designation 1910 KD. The asteroid was later named Hela, possibly after the Norse goddess of the dead Hel, ruler of the underworld.

Subsequent observations of Hela were conducted by Johann Palisa in Vienna on 10 and 14 June and 2, 4, and 5 July. Helffrich and Palisa's observations were unfavorably distributed, preventing the calculation of Hela's orbit. Nevertheless, its high eccentricity was already noticed by astronomers. In 1911, astronomer Adolf Berberich identified the lost asteroid 1902 KQ with Hela; by that time, Hela had been assigned the number (699). 1902 KQ was observed from Heidelberg Observatory on 21 November 1902, making these observations the earliest precoveries of Hela identified.

In 1925, the style of minor planet provisional designations was changed from a rotating system from AA to ZZ to one tied to half-months and days of the month. This system is currently in use, and was retroactively extended to minor planets discovered before 1925. Thus, Hela's designations for its official discovery and earliest precovery were changed from 1910 KD and 1902 KQ to 1910 LC and 1902 WE, respectively.

== Orbit ==
Hela orbits the Sun with an average distance, or semi-major axis, of 2.61 astronomical units (AU), taking 4.23 years to complete one orbit. Due to its high orbital eccentricity of 0.41, its distance from the Sun varies from 3.69 AU at aphelion to 1.54 AU at perihelion, crossing the orbit of Mars. It has an orbital inclination of 15.29° with respect to the ecliptic plane.

== Physical characteristics ==
With an absolute magnitude of 11.7, the asteroid is about 12–27 km in diameter. It is classified as a stony Sk or Sq-type asteroid in the SMASS taxonomy. Photometry data used to produce light curves provide a rotation period of 3.39624±0.00006 h. The lightcurve inversion method was used to build a shape model with a rounded form and an equatorial bulge.
