= 10249 Harz =

Main-belt asteroid

Discovery
- Discovered by: C. J. van Houten; I. van Houten-G. T. Gehrels
- Discovery site: Palomar Obs.
- Discovery date: 17 October 1960

Designations
- Named after: Harz (German mountain range)
- Alternative designations: 9515 P-L · 1985 TY
- Minor planet category: main-belt · (middle) background

Orbital characteristics
- Epoch 23 March 2018 (JD 2458200.5)
- Uncertainty parameter 0
- Observation arc: 55.64 yr (20,323 d)
- Aphelion: 2.8174 AU
- Perihelion: 2.3354 AU
- Semi-major axis: 2.5764 AU
- Eccentricity: 0.0935
- Orbital period (sidereal): 4.14 yr (1,510 d)
- Mean anomaly: 291.52°
- Mean motion: 0° 14^{m} 17.88^{s} / day
- Inclination: 3.6347°
- Longitude of ascending node: 51.878°
- Argument of perihelion: 342.89°

Physical characteristics
- Mean diameter: 3.15 km (calculated); 3.59±0.26 km
- Synodic rotation period: 3.631±0.0006 h 3.64±0.01 h
- Geometric albedo: 0.20 (assumed); 0.261±0.070
- Spectral type: S (assumed)
- Absolute magnitude (H): 14.30; 14.4; 14.41±0.17 (R); 14.426±0.003 (R); 14.82±0.25; 14.88

10249 Harz, provisional designation 9515 P-L, is a background asteroid from the central regions of the asteroid belt, approximately 3.5 kilometers (2.2 miles) in diameter. It was discovered on 17 October 1960, by Ingrid and Cornelis van Houten at Leiden, and Tom Gehrels at Palomar Observatory in California, United States. The assumed S-type asteroid is likely elongated and has a short rotation period of 3.63 hours. It was named after the German mountain range Harz.

== Orbit and classification ==
Harz is a non-family asteroid from the main belt's background population. It orbits the Sun in the central main-belt at a distance of 2.3–2.8 AU once every 4 years and 2 months (1,510 days; semi-major axis of 2.58 AU). Its orbit has an eccentricity of 0.09 and an inclination of 4° with respect to the ecliptic. The body's observation arc begins with its official discovery observation at Palomar in October 1960.

=== Palomar–Leiden survey ===
The survey designation "P-L" stands for Palomar–Leiden, named after Palomar Observatory and Leiden Observatory, which collaborated on the fruitful Palomar–Leiden survey in the 1960s. Gehrels used Palomar's Samuel Oschin telescope (also known as the 48-inch Schmidt Telescope), and shipped the photographic plates to Ingrid and Cornelis van Houten at Leiden Observatory where astrometry was carried out. The trio are credited with the discovery of several thousand asteroid discoveries.

== Physical characteristics ==
Harz is an assumed S-type asteroid, which agrees with the measured albedo (see below) by the Wide-field Infrared Survey Explorer (WISE).

=== Rotation period ===
In October 2010, and December 2014, two rotational lightcurves of Harz were obtained from photometric observations in the R-band by astronomers at the Palomar Transient Factory in California. Lightcurve analysis gave a rotation period of 3.631 and 3.64 hours with a brightness amplitude of 0.47 and 0.52 magnitude, respectively, indicating that the body has an elongated shape (U=2/2).

=== Diameter and albedo ===
According to the survey carried out by the NEOWISE mission of NASA's WISE telescope, Harz measures between 3.59 kilometers in diameter and its surface has an albedo of 0.26, while the Collaborative Asteroid Lightcurve Link assumes a standard albedo for stony asteroids of 0.20 and calculates a diameter of 3.15 kilometers based on an absolute magnitude of 14.88.

== Naming ==
This minor planet was named after the Harz mountains, an old German mountain range where silver was mined until the last century. Legend has it that the witches gathered on their broomsticks on a plateau in the Harz mountains on the first day of May. The legendary place where the witches danced is known as Hexentanzplatz. The official naming citation was published by the Minor Planet Center on 1 May 2003 (M.P.C. 48390).
