= 378 Holmia =

Main-belt asteroid

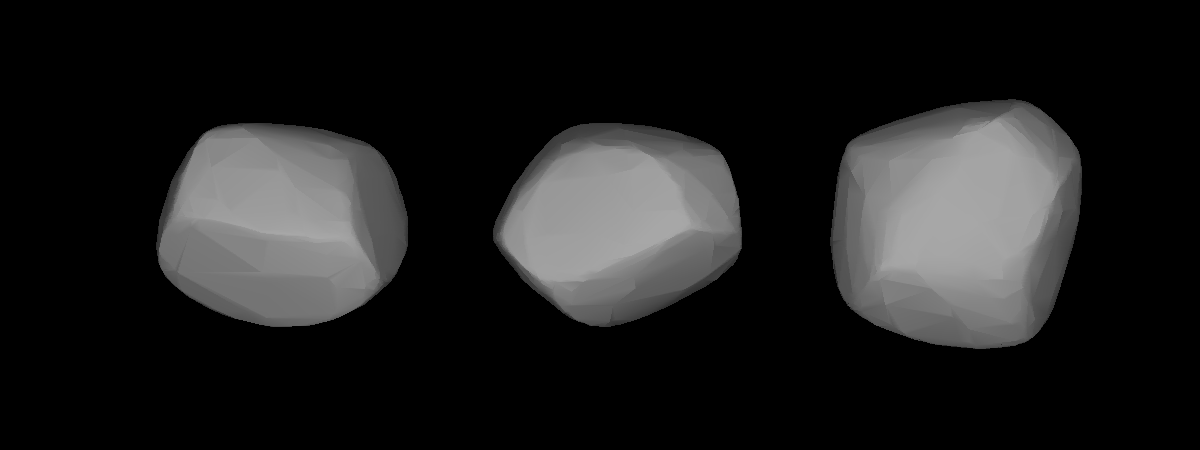
- A three-dimensional model of 378 Holmia based on its light curve

Discovery
- Discovered by: Auguste Charlois
- Discovery date: 6 December 1893

Designations
- Pronunciation: /ˈhoʊ(l)miə/
- Named after: Stockholm
- Alternative designations: A893 XA · 1953 XS_{1} · 1960 FJ · 1962 TP · 1962 UC · 1979 KP_{1} (Note: The MPC notates Holmia's retroactive new-style designation as 1893 XA. Its old-style designation was 1893 AP.)
- Minor planet category: Main belt

Orbital characteristics
- Epoch 21 November 2025 (JD 2461000.5)
- Uncertainty parameter 0
- Observation arc: 131.53 yr (48040 d)
- Aphelion: 3.1363 AU (469.18 Gm)
- Perihelion: 2.4170 AU (361.58 Gm)
- Semi-major axis: 2.7767 AU (415.39 Gm)
- Eccentricity: 0.1295
- Orbital period (sidereal): 4.6269 yr (1690.0 d)
- Average orbital speed: 17.88 km/s
- Mean anomaly: 217.667°
- Mean motion: 0° 12^{m} 46.8^{s} / day
- Inclination: 7.0123°
- Longitude of ascending node: 232.356°
- Argument of perihelion: 156.671°
- Jupiter MOID: 2.3037 AU
- T_{Jupiter}: 3.312

Physical characteristics
- Dimensions: 27.831 km
- Sidereal rotation period: 4.440 ± 0.009 h (0.18500 ± 0.00038 d)
- Geometric albedo: 0.339
- Spectral type: S-type
- Absolute magnitude (H): 9.81

378 Holmia is a stony asteroid located in the main asteroid belt. It was discovered on 6 December 1893 by French astronomer Auguste Charlois at Nice Observatory. Its name comes from the Holmia, the Latin name for Stockholm, the capital of Sweden. It is irregular in shape and 27.831 kilometres (17.293 mi) in diameter, rotating once every 4.44 hours.

== Discovery and naming ==
Holmia was discovered by French astronomer Auguste Charlois on 6 December 1893 at Nice Observatory. It was given the provisional designation 1893 AP and assigned the number (378), and its discovery was announced in the journal Astronomische Nachrichten on 13 December. The asteroid is named after the Latin form of Sweden's capital, Stockholm—Holmia. This etymology is shared with element 67, holmium.

In 1925, the old-style scheme for minor planet provisional designations was replaced by the scheme currently in use. The Minor Planet Center (MPC) has since retroactively applied the new-style scheme to pre-1925 designations. Thus, Holmia's provisional designation given upon its discovery was changed to A893 XA.

== Orbit ==
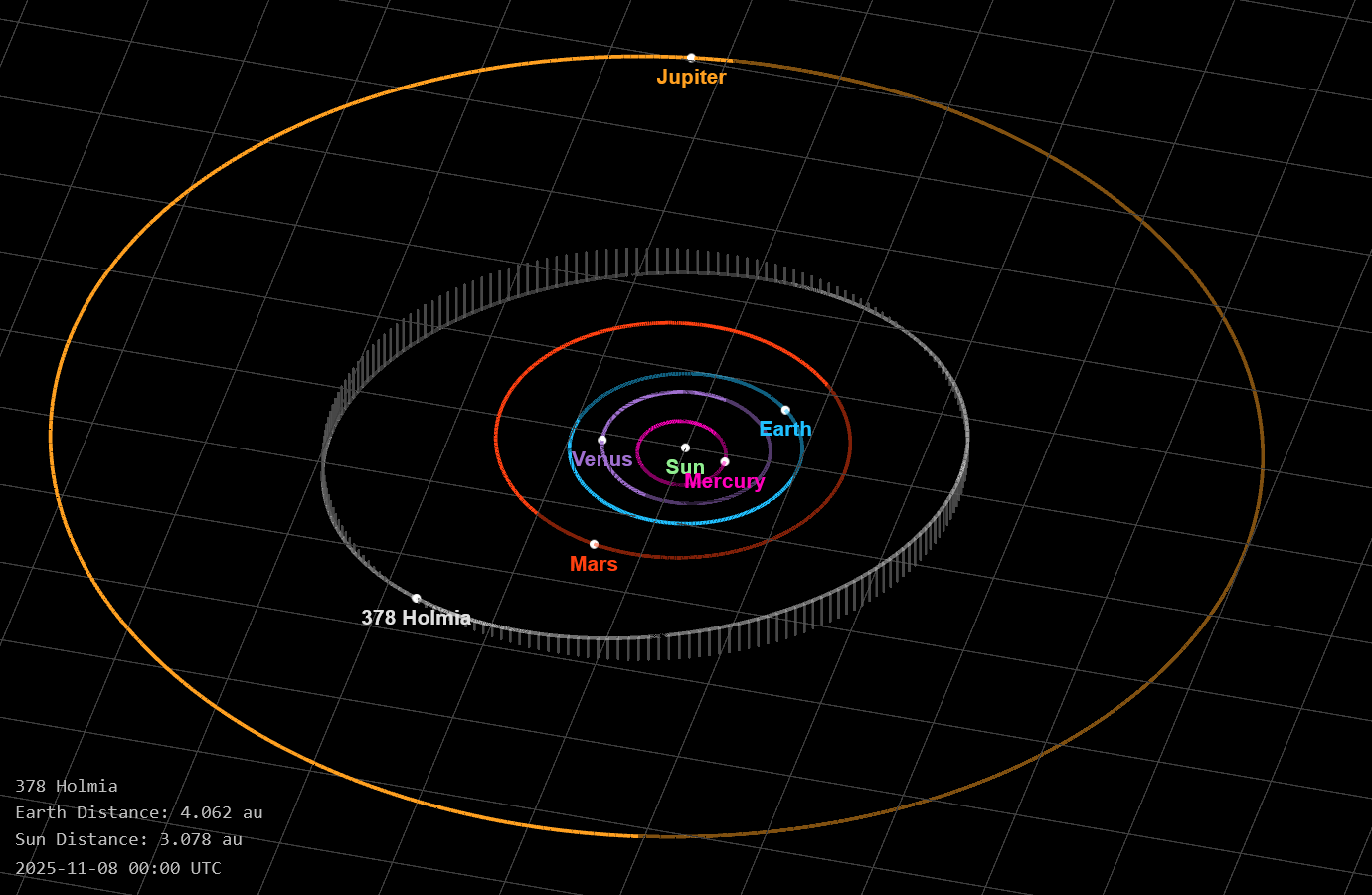
An orbital diagram of 378 Holmia, located between Mars and Jupiter. The grid of the ecliptic plane is shown.

Holmia orbits the Sun at an average distance—its semi-major axis—of 2.78 astronomical units (AU), placing it in the main asteroid belt. Along its 4.63 year long orbit, its distance from the Sun varies from 2.42 AU at perihelion to 3.14 AU at aphelion due to its orbital eccentricity of 0.13. Its orbit is inclined by 7.01° with respect to the ecliptic plane. It is classified as a background asteroid, as it does not belong to any known asteroid family.

== Physical characteristics ==
Holmia has an estimated diameter of 27.831 kilometres (17.293 mi). Under the Tholen classification scheme, it is categorized as an S-type asteroid, and it has a geometric albedo of 0.339. Analysis of its lightcurve, or variations in its observed brightness, suggests that it has a rotation period of 4.44 hours. Its lightcurve also indicates that it is irregular in shape, with flat features near its equator.
