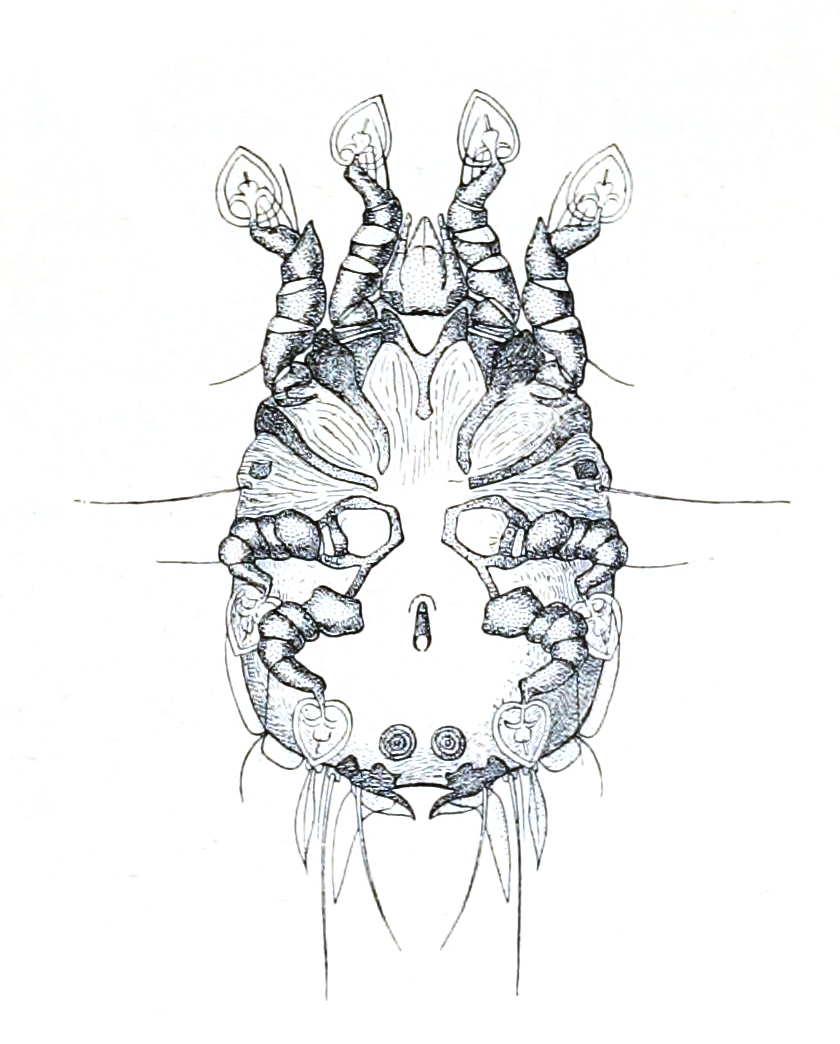
- Freyana anatina

Scientific classification
- Kingdom: Animalia
- Phylum: Arthropoda
- Subphylum: Chelicerata
- Class: Arachnida
- Order: Sarcoptiformes
- Family: Freyanidae
- Genus: Freyana; Haller, 1877

= Freyana =

Genus of spiders

Freyana is a genus of mites belonging to the family Freyanidae.

The species of this genus are found in Asia and Northern America.

Species:

- Freyana anatina (Koch, 1844)
- Freyana anserina Megnin & Trouessart, 1884
