= 1845 Helewalda =

Carbonaceous Eoan asteroid

Discovery
- Discovered by: P. Wild
- Discovery site: Zimmerwald Obs.
- Discovery date: 30 October 1972

Designations
- Named after: Helen Gachnang (friend of discoverer)
- Alternative designations: 1972 UC · 1931 VC_{1} 1954 GG · 1971 OR; 1971 QX_{2}
- Minor planet category: main-belt · (outer); Eos

Orbital characteristics
- Epoch 4 September 2017 (JD 2458000.5)
- Uncertainty parameter 0
- Observation arc: 85.50 yr (31,229 days)
- Aphelion: 3.1371 AU
- Perihelion: 2.8001 AU
- Semi-major axis: 2.9686 AU
- Eccentricity: 0.0568
- Orbital period (sidereal): 5.11 yr (1,868 days)
- Mean anomaly: 210.23°
- Mean motion: 0° 11^{m} 33.72^{s} / day
- Inclination: 10.720°
- Longitude of ascending node: 142.61°
- Argument of perihelion: 325.05°

Physical characteristics
- Dimensions: 19.930±0.377; 20.426±0.147 km 32.03 km (calculated)
- Synodic rotation period: 7.2786±0.0002 h 7.3985±0.0098 h 7.399±0.004 h 7.4±0.1 h
- Geometric albedo: 0.057 (assumed); 0.1289±0.0185; 0.134±0.014
- Spectral type: C (assumed)
- Absolute magnitude (H): 11.193±0.002 · 11.2 · 11.3 · 11.60±0.98

1845 Helewalda (provisional designation 1972 UC) is a carbonaceous Eoan asteroid in the outer regions of the asteroid belt, approximately 20 kilometers in diameter. It was discovered by Swiss astronomer Paul Wild at Zimmerwald Observatory near Bern, Switzerland, on 30 October 1972. The asteroid was named after Helen Gachnang, a friend of the discoverer.

== Orbit and classification ==
Helewalda is a member of the Eos family (606), the largest asteroid family in the outer main belt consisting of nearly 10,000 asteroids. It orbits the Sun in the outer main-belt at a distance of 2.8–3.1 AU once every 5 years and 1 month (1,868 days). Its orbit has an eccentricity of 0.06 and an inclination of 11° with respect to the ecliptic. The first precovery was taken at Lowell Observatory in 1931, extending the asteroid's observation arc by 41 years prior to its discovery.

== Physical characteristics ==
Helewalda is an assumed carbonaceous C-type asteroid.

=== Rotation period ===
Based on observations made by French astronomer René Roy in March 2010, Helewalda has a well-determined rotation period of 7.2786±0.0002 hours with a brightness variation of 0.26 in magnitude (U=3-).

Between 2009 and 2015, other lightcurves were obtained at the Oakley Southern Sky Observatory in Australia (E09), the Via Capote Observatory at Thousand Oaks, California (G69), and the Palomar Transient Factory at Palomar Observatory. They gave a similar period of 7.399±0.004, 7.4±0.1 and 7.3985±0.0098 hours with a corresponding amplitude of 0.20, 0.28 and 0.15, respectively (U=2/2+/2).

=== Diameter and albedo ===
The Collaborative Asteroid Lightcurve Link calculates a diameter of 32.0 kilometers, based on an assumed standard albedo for carbonaceous C-type asteroids of 0.057, while the NEOWISE mission of NASA's Wide-field Infrared Survey Explorer measured a higher albedo of 0.134 and 0.129 and a corresponding diameter of 19.9 and 20.4 kilometers in diameter, respectively.

== Naming ==
The discoverer, Paul Wild, named a pair of asteroids after two of his former schoolmates, Susi and Helen, both from the small village of Wald, Zürich in Switzerland. This one was dedicated to Helen Gachnang, while the previously numbered asteroid 1844 Susilva was given to Susi Petit-Pierre. The official naming citation was published by the Minor Planet Center on 18 April 1977 (M.P.C. 4156).
