= 426 Hippo =

Main-belt asteroid

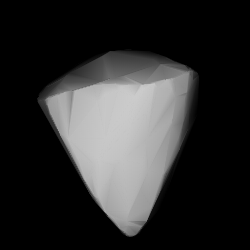
- Modelled shape of Hippo from its lightcurve

Discovery
- Discovered by: Auguste Charlois
- Discovery date: 25 August 1897

Designations
- Pronunciation: /ˈhɪpoʊ/
- Named after: Hippo Regius (Ἱππών Hippōn)
- Alternative designations: 1897 DH
- Minor planet category: Main belt
- Adjectives: Hipponian /hɪˈpoʊniən/

Orbital characteristics
- Epoch 31 July 2016 (JD 2457600.5)
- Uncertainty parameter 0
- Observation arc: 112.19 yr (40977 d)
- Aphelion: 3.1893 AU (477.11 Gm)
- Perihelion: 2.5893 AU (387.35 Gm)
- Semi-major axis: 2.8893 AU (432.23 Gm)
- Eccentricity: 0.10384
- Orbital period (sidereal): 4.91 yr (1793.8 d)
- Mean anomaly: 247.692°
- Mean motion: 0° 12^{m} 2.484^{s} / day
- Inclination: 19.4771°
- Longitude of ascending node: 311.419°
- Argument of perihelion: 222.319°

Proper orbital elements
- Proper semi-major axis: 2.88928 AU
- Proper eccentricity: 0.179526
- Proper inclination: 20.3798°
- Proper mean motion: 73.2862 deg / yr
- Proper orbital period: 4.91225 yr (1794.199 d)
- Precession of perihelion long.: 32.8357 arcsec / yr
- Precession of asc. node: −59.8571 arcsec / yr

Physical characteristics
- Mean diameter: 122 ± 4 km 129+19 −8 km (alternate pole solution)
- Mass: (1.86±0.57)×10^{18} kg (Note: Calculated from its standard gravitational parameter GM = 0.124±0.038 km^{3}/s^{2}.)
- Mean density: 1.65–1.95 g/cm^{3} (calculated)
- Synodic rotation period: 69.5041 ± 0.0005 h 69.5038 ± 0.0005 h (alternate pole solution)
- Pole ecliptic longitude: 223° ± 80° 62° ± 55° (alternate pole solution)
- Pole ecliptic latitude: −89° ± 17° −49° ± 20° (alternate pole solution)
- Geometric albedo: 0.0469±0.003
- Temperature: 154-171 K
- Spectral type: F
- Absolute magnitude (H): 8.42

426 Hippo is a rather large main-belt asteroid. It was discovered by Auguste Charlois on August 25, 1897, in Nice. In the 22nd century, it will come closer than 6,000,000 km (0.04 AU) to the larger asteroids 65 Cybele and 511 Davida.

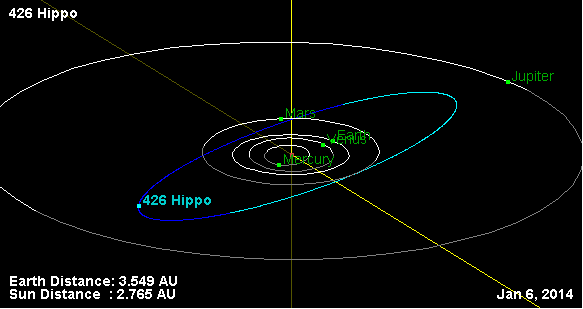
Orbital diagram of Hippo
