= 10252 Heidigraf =

Koronian asteroid from the outer regions of the asteroid belt

Discovery
- Discovered by: C. J. van Houten; I. van Houten-G. T. Gehrels
- Discovery site: Palomar Obs.
- Discovery date: 26 March 1971

Designations
- Named after: Heidi Graf (ESA manager)
- Alternative designations: 4164 T-1 · 1978 VX_{15}
- Minor planet category: main-belt · (outer); Koronis

Orbital characteristics
- Epoch 23 March 2018 (JD 2458200.5)
- Uncertainty parameter 0
- Observation arc: 46.83 yr (17,106 d)
- Aphelion: 3.0525 AU
- Perihelion: 2.6524 AU
- Semi-major axis: 2.8524 AU
- Eccentricity: 0.0701
- Orbital period (sidereal): 4.82 yr (1,760 d)
- Mean anomaly: 138.89°
- Mean motion: 0° 12^{m} 16.56^{s} / day
- Inclination: 2.2591°
- Longitude of ascending node: 33.300°
- Argument of perihelion: 289.53°

Physical characteristics
- Mean diameter: 5.15 km (calculated); 5.782±0.203 km
- Geometric albedo: 0.24 (assumed); 0.331±0.057; 0.4007±0.1010
- Spectral type: S (assumed)
- Absolute magnitude (H): 12.8; 13.160±0.190 (R); 13.2; 13.61

10252 Heidigraf, provisional designation 4164 T-1, is a Koronian asteroid from the outer regions of the asteroid belt, approximately 6 kilometers (3.7 miles) in diameter. It was discovered during the Palomar–Leiden Trojan survey on 26 March 1971, by Ingrid and Cornelis van Houten at Leiden, and Tom Gehrels at Palomar Observatory in California, United States. The likely elongated S-type asteroid has a brightness variation of 0.56 magnitude. It was named after Heidi Graf, a former Head of the ESTEC Communications Office.

== Orbit and classification ==
Heidigraf is a core member of the Koronis family (605), a very large outer asteroid family of six thousand known members with nearly co-planar ecliptical orbits. It orbits the Sun in the outer main-belt at a distance of 2.7–3.1 AU once every 4 years and 10 months (1,760 days; semi-major axis of 2.85 AU). Its orbit has an eccentricity of 0.07 and an inclination of 2° with respect to the ecliptic. The body's observation arc begins at Palomar on 24 March 1971, two nights prior to its official discovery observation.

=== Palomar–Leiden Trojan survey ===
The survey designation "T-1" stands for the first Palomar–Leiden Trojan survey, named after the fruitful collaboration of the Palomar and Leiden Observatory in the 1960s and 1970s. Gehrels used Palomar's Samuel Oschin telescope (also known as the 48-inch Schmidt Telescope), and shipped the photographic plates to Ingrid and Cornelis van Houten at Leiden Observatory where astrometry was carried out. The trio are credited with the discovery of several thousand asteroid discoveries.

== Physical characteristics ==
Heidigraf is an assumed stony S-type asteroid, which is the overall spectral type of the Koronis family.

=== Rotation period ===
In January 2014, astronomers at the Palomar Transient Factory observed Heidigraf photometrically in the R-band during which it showed a brightness amplitude of 0.56 magnitude, indicative for a non-spheroidal shape. However no rotational lightcurve could be constructed and its rotation period remains unknown.

=== Diameter and albedo ===
According to the survey carried out by the NEOWISE mission of NASA's Wide-field Infrared Survey Explorer, Heidigraf measures 5.782 kilometers in diameter and its surface has an albedo of 0.331 and 0.4007, respectively. The Collaborative Asteroid Lightcurve Link assumes an albedo of 0.24 and calculates a diameter of 5.15 kilometers based on an absolute magnitude of 13.61.

== Naming ==
This minor planet was named after Heidi Graf (born 1941), former Head of the European Space Research and Technology Centre (ESTEC) Communications Office from 1977 to 2006 at the European Space Agency, ESA. The official naming citation was published by the Minor Planet Center on 9 November 2006 (M.P.C. 57950).
