= 5 Astraea =

Large asteroid

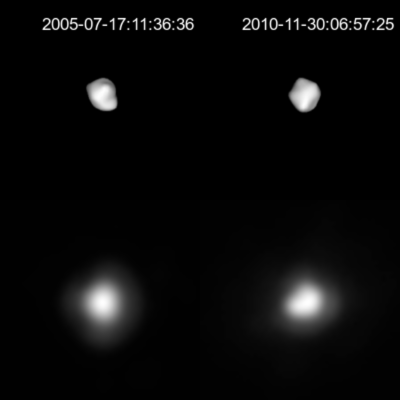
- Images of 5 Astraea (bottom) compared with 3D models based on lightcurve data (top)

Discovery
- Discovered by: K. L. Hencke
- Discovery site: Driesen Obs.
- Discovery date: 8 December 1845

Designations
- Pronunciation: /æˈstriːə/
- Named after: Astraea (Greek goddess)
- Alternative designations: 1969 SE
- Minor planet category: main-belt · (middle); Astraea
- Adjectives: Astraean
- Symbol: (historical astronomical) (modern astrological)

Orbital characteristics
- Epoch 23 March 2018 (JD 2458200.5)
- Uncertainty parameter 0
- Observation arc: 171.93 yr (62,799 d)
- Aphelion: 3.0659 AU
- Perihelion: 2.0810 AU
- Semi-major axis: 2.5735 AU
- Eccentricity: 0.1914
- Orbital period (sidereal): 4.13 yr (1,508 d)
- Mean anomaly: 186.83°
- Mean motion: 0° 14^{m} 19.32^{s} / day
- Inclination: 5.3677°
- Longitude of ascending node: 141.58°
- Time of perihelion: 2028-Jun-27
- Argument of perihelion: 358.75°

Proper orbital elements
- Proper semi-major axis: 2.5761849 AU
- Proper eccentricity: 0.1980486
- Proper inclination: 4.5118628°
- Proper mean motion: 87.046396 deg / yr
- Proper orbital period: 4.13573 yr (1510.574 d)
- Precession of perihelion long.: 52.210903 arcsec / yr
- Precession of asc. node: −57.357951 arcsec / yr

Physical characteristics
- Dimensions: 169 km × 125 km × 83 km
- Mean diameter: 114 ± 4 km
- Surface area: 48 900 km^{2} (Note: Calculated based on the known parameters)
- Volume: 920 000 km^{3}
- Mass: (2.29±0.13)×10^{18} kg (Note: Calculated from its standard gravitational parameter GM = 0.153±0.009 km^{3}/s^{2}.)
- Mean density: 2.95±0.36 g/cm^{3}
- Synodic rotation period: 16.80060 h (0.700025 d)
- Equatorial rotation velocity: 6.49 m/s
- Pole ecliptic longitude: 125° ± 3°
- Pole ecliptic latitude: 39° ± 3°
- Geometric albedo: 0.227
- Spectral type: S
- Apparent magnitude: 9.0 to 13.0
- Absolute magnitude (H): 6.85
- Angular diameter: 0.15" to 0.041"

5 Astraea (/æˈstriːə/) is an asteroid in the asteroid belt. This object is orbiting the Sun at a distance of 385 million kilometres (2.5735 AU) with a period of 4.13 yr and an orbital eccentricity of 0.19. The orbital plane is inclined at an angle of 5.37° to the plane of the ecliptic. It is spinning with a period of 16.8 h. The surface of Astraea is highly reflective and its composition is probably a mixture of nickel–iron with silicates of magnesium and iron. It is an S-type asteroid in the Tholen classification system.

== Discovery and name ==
Astraea was the fifth asteroid discovered, on 8 December 1845, by Karl Ludwig Hencke and named for Astraea, a Greek goddess of justice named after the stars. It was his first of two asteroid discoveries. The second was 6 Hebe. A German amateur astronomer and post office headmaster, Hencke was looking for 4 Vesta when he stumbled on Astraea. The King of Prussia awarded him an annual pension of 1200 marks for the discovery.

Hencke's symbol for Astraea is an inverted anchor, encoded in Unicode 17.0 as U+1F778 🝸, though given Astraea's role with justice and precision, it is perhaps a stylized set of scales, or a typographic substitute for one. This symbol is no longer used. The astrological symbol is a percent sign, encoded specifically at U+2BD9 ⯙, or a standard percent sign ("%") can also be used. The modern astronomical symbol is a simple encircled 5 (⑤).

For 38 years after the discovery of the fourth known asteroid, Vesta, in 1807, no further asteroids were discovered. After the discovery of Astraea, 8 more were discovered in the following 5 years, and 24 were found in the 5 years after that. The discovery of Astraea proved to be the starting point for the eventual reclassification of the four original asteroids (which were identified as planets at the time), as it became apparent that these were only the largest of a new type of celestial body with thousands of members.

== Characteristics ==
Photometry indicates prograde rotation, that the north pole points in the direction of ecliptic coordinates (125°, 39°), with a 3° uncertainty. This gives an axial tilt of about 33°. With an apparent magnitude of 8.7 (on a favorable opposition on 15 February 2016), it is only the seventeenth-brightest main-belt asteroid, and fainter than, for example, 192 Nausikaa or even 324 Bamberga (at rare near-perihelion oppositions).

A stellar occultation on 6 June 2008 allowed Astraea's diameter to be estimated; it was found to be 115 ± 6 km.

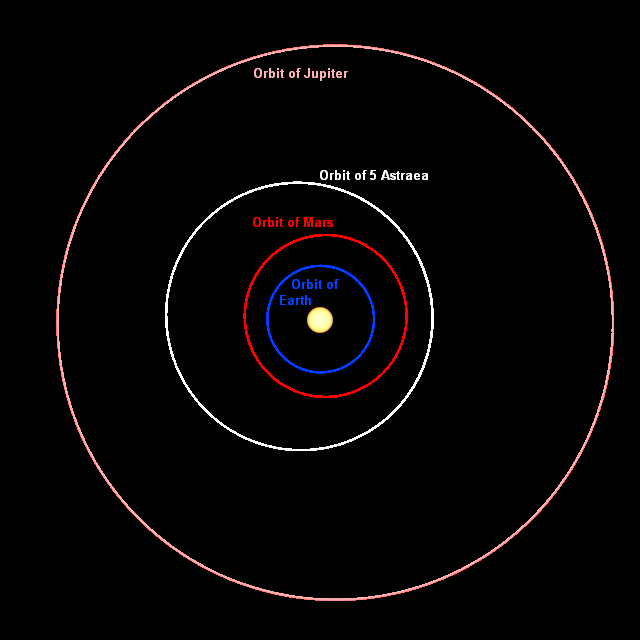
Left: A size comparison of the first 10 numbered asteroids profiled against Earth's Moon.
Right: The orbit of 5 Astraea in white compared with those of Earth, Mars and Jupiter.

== See also ==
- Former classification of planets
