= 701 Oriola =

Main-belt asteroid

Discovery
- Discovered by: J. Helffrich
- Discovery site: Heidelberg Observatory
- Discovery date: 12 July 1910

Designations
- Pronunciation: /ɒrˈraɪələ/
- Named after: oriole
- Alternative designations: A910 ND; 1946 KB; 1950 BN1; 1958 TC1; A899 LD; A906 TB
- Minor planet category: Main belt

Orbital characteristics
- Epoch 31 May 2020 (JD 2459000.5)
- Uncertainty parameter 0
- Observation arc: 113.68 yr (41522 d)
- Aphelion: 3.1248 AU (467.46 Gm)
- Perihelion: 2.9117 AU (435.58 Gm)
- Semi-major axis: 3.0183 AU (451.53 Gm)
- Eccentricity: 0.035303
- Orbital period (sidereal): 5.24 yr (1915.3 d)
- Mean anomaly: 75.376°
- Mean motion: 0° 11^{m} 16.656^{s} / day
- Inclination: 7.134°
- Longitude of ascending node: 243.703°
- Argument of perihelion: 328.166°

Physical characteristics
- Dimensions: 42.9 km
- Synodic rotation period: 9.090 h (0.3788 d)
- Geometric albedo: 0.191±0.020
- Spectral type: C
- Absolute magnitude (H): 9.2

701 Oriola /ɒrˈraɪələ/ is a main belt asteroid. This C-type asteroid shows possible broad absorption which may be explained by either magnesium-rich amorphous pyroxene or crystalline silicate. This likely accounts for the relatively high albedo as an outer-belt asteroid.
