= 6 Hebe =

Large main-belt asteroid

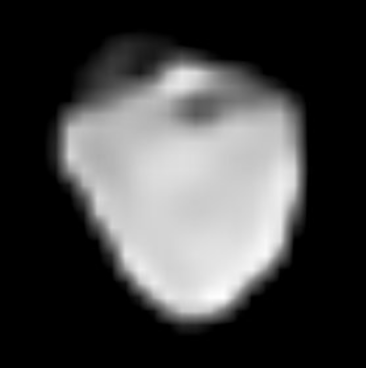
- Hebe imaged by the European Southern Observatory's Very Large Telescope

Discovery
- Discovered by: Karl Ludwig Hencke
- Discovery site: Driesen, Prussia
- Discovery date: 1 July 1847

Designations
- Pronunciation: /ˈhiːbiː/
- Named after: Hēbē
- Alternative designations: A847 NA; 1847 JB
- Minor planet category: Main belt
- Adjectives: Hebean /hiːˈbiːən/ (trad.)
- Symbol: (historical)

Orbital characteristics
- Epoch 13 September 2023 (JD 2453300.5)
- Uncertainty parameter 0
- Aphelion: 2.92 AU (437 million km)
- Perihelion: 1.93 AU (289 million km)
- Semi-major axis: 2.43 AU (364 million km)
- Eccentricity: 0.2027
- Orbital period (sidereal): 3.78 yr (1379.85 d)
- Average orbital speed: 18.93 km/s
- Mean anomaly: 144.0°
- Inclination: 14.736°
- Longitude of ascending node: 138.63°
- Time of perihelion: 19 December 2025
- Argument of perihelion: 239.59°
- Earth MOID: 0.97 AU (145 million km)

Proper orbital elements
- Proper semi-major axis: 2.4252710 AU
- Proper eccentricity: 0.1584864
- Proper inclination: 14.3511092°
- Proper mean motion: 95.303184 deg / yr
- Proper orbital period: 3.77742 yr (1379.702 d)
- Precession of perihelion long.: 31.568209 arcsec / yr
- Precession of asc. node: −41.829042 arcsec / yr

Physical characteristics
- Dimensions: (220±9 × 205±8 × 166±7) km (213.4 × 200.2 × 172.6) ± 6 km
- Mean diameter: 195±3 km 193±6 km
- Volume: (3.75±0.12)×10^{6} km^{3}
- Mass: (1.236±0.022)×10^{19} kg (Note: Calculated from its standard gravitational parameter GM = 0.825±0.015 km^{3}/s^{2}.)
- Mean density: 3.19±0.16 g/cm^{3}
- Equatorial surface gravity: ~0.079–0.096 m/s^{2}
- Equatorial escape velocity: ~0.127–0.134 km/s (457–482 km/h)
- Synodic rotation period: 7.274467±0.000001 h
- Axial tilt: 36°
- Pole ecliptic longitude: 342° ± 2°
- Pole ecliptic latitude: 50° ± 1°
- Geometric albedo: 0.24 ± 0.01; 0.268
- Temperature: 180–230 K
- Spectral type: S
- Apparent magnitude: 7.5 to 11.50
- Absolute magnitude (H): 5.71; 5.62
- Angular diameter: 0.26" to 0.065"

6 Hebe (/ˈhiːbiː/) is a large main-belt asteroid, containing around 0.5% of the mass of the belt. However, due to its apparently high bulk density (greater than that of the Moon), Hebe does not rank among the top twenty asteroids by volume. This high bulk density suggests an extremely solid body that has not been impacted by collisions, which is not typical of asteroids of its size – they tend to be loosely-bound rubble piles.

In brightness, Hebe is the fifth-brightest object in the asteroid belt after Vesta, Ceres, Iris, and Pallas. It has a mean opposition magnitude of +8.3, about equal to the mean brightness of Saturn's moon Titan, and can reach +7.5 at an opposition near perihelion.

Hebe may be the parent body of the H chondrite meteorites, which account for about 40% of all meteorites striking Earth.

== History ==
Hebe was discovered on 1 July 1847 by German astronomer Karl Ludwig Hencke in the town of Driesen, Brandenburg, Prussia (now Drezdenko, Poland). It is the sixth asteroid discovered. It was the second and final asteroid discovery by Hencke, after 5 Astraea. The name Hebe, after the Greek goddess of youth, was proposed by Carl Friedrich Gauss at Hencke's request. The first asteroids discovered had widely been considered planets by astronomers, but the rapid discoveries of several new asteroids in the late 1840s complicated the classification of asteroids. In the years following its discovery, Hebe was variously labelled as a planet, small planet, or asteroid. Eventually, throughout the latter half of the 19th century, the terms "asteroid" and "minor planet" became favored, although some astronomers continued referring to Hebe as a planet in this period.

Gauss chose a wineglass as Hebe's astronomical symbol. It was encoded in Unicode 17.0 as U+1CEC0 𜻀. As asteroids and their symbols grew in number, the practicality of assigning unique astronomical symbols to each asteroid was questioned. In 1851, astronomer Johann Franz Encke proposed a simpler system of a number—denoting the order of discovery—inscribed in a circle. For Hebe, this would be ⑥. This system was widely adopted by astronomers, though astronomers eventually switched to using parentheses enclosing the number—thus (6) Hebe or 6 Hebe in modern notation.

On 5 March 1977, Hebe occulted the star γ Ceti A (Kaffaljidhma).

== Orbit ==
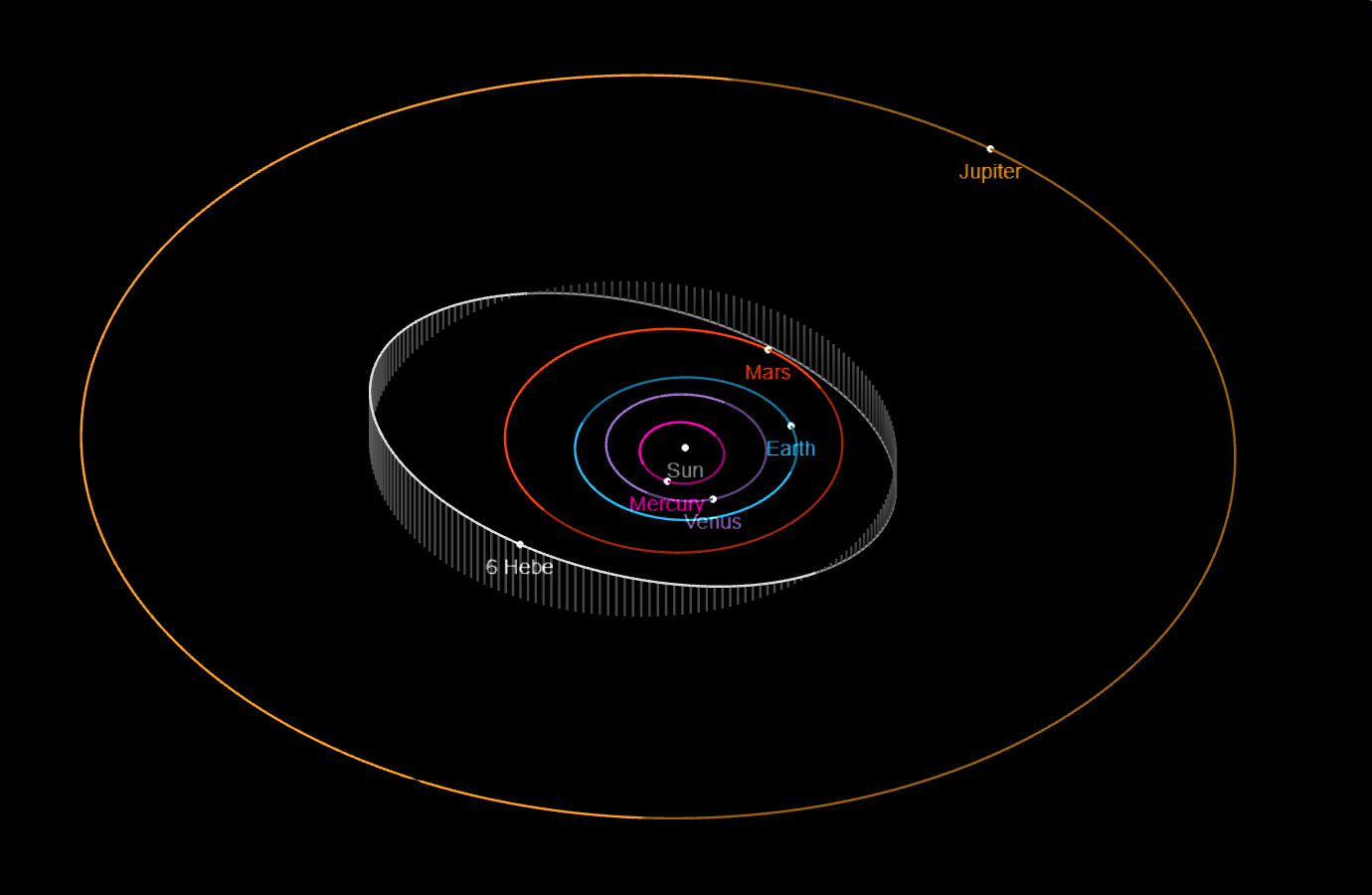
The orbit of 6 Hebe compared with the orbits of the inner planets and Jupiter

Hebe orbits the Sun with an average distance (or semi-major axis) of 2.426 astronomical units (AU), placing it in the inner section of the main asteroid belt. Its distance to the Sun varies from 1.935 AU at perihelion to 2.917 AU at aphelion due to its moderately elliptical orbit, indicated by its orbital eccentricity of 0.202. It has an orbital period of 3.778 Earth years, following an orbit inclined by 14.74° with respect to the ecliptic plane.

Hebe resides near but does not participate in several orbital resonances. It orbits close to the 3:1 mean-motion resonance (MMR) with Jupiter at approximately 2.50 AU. Asteroids caught in the 3:1 Jovian MMR have orbital periods one-third that of Jupiter's; their orbits are destabilized and they are eventually removed by encounters with the planets, creating the 3:1 Kirkwood gap. Hebe is also located near the destabilizing $\nu_{\rm 6}$ ($g = g_{\rm 6}$) secular resonance with Saturn, which at Hebe's average distance of 2.426 AU is located at 15–16° inclination.

== Possible Hebe family ==
In the 1990s, Hebe was identified as a possible source for H chondrites and IIE iron meteorites. Its location near the 3:1 Jovian MMR and the $\nu_{\rm 6}$ Saturnian secular resonance means that fragments created by impact events are easily destabilized into Earth-crossing orbits, where they could eventually impact Earth as meteorites. Indeed, the H chondritic surface compositions of two near-Earth objects—(4953) 1990 MU and 2007 LE—point towards Hebe as their parent body. Spectral observations of asteroids near the 3:1 Kirkwood gap in the early 2010s identified 695 Bella, 1166 Sakuntala, and 1607 Mavis as potential relatives of Hebe. However, they are located on the opposite side of the 3:1 Kirkwood gap, indicating that they jumped across the gap. In 2020, a study led by Sherry K. Fieber-Beyer identified nine additional candidate members of the tentative Hebe family, with some located on Hebe's side of the 3:1 Kirkwood gap.

== Physical characteristics ==
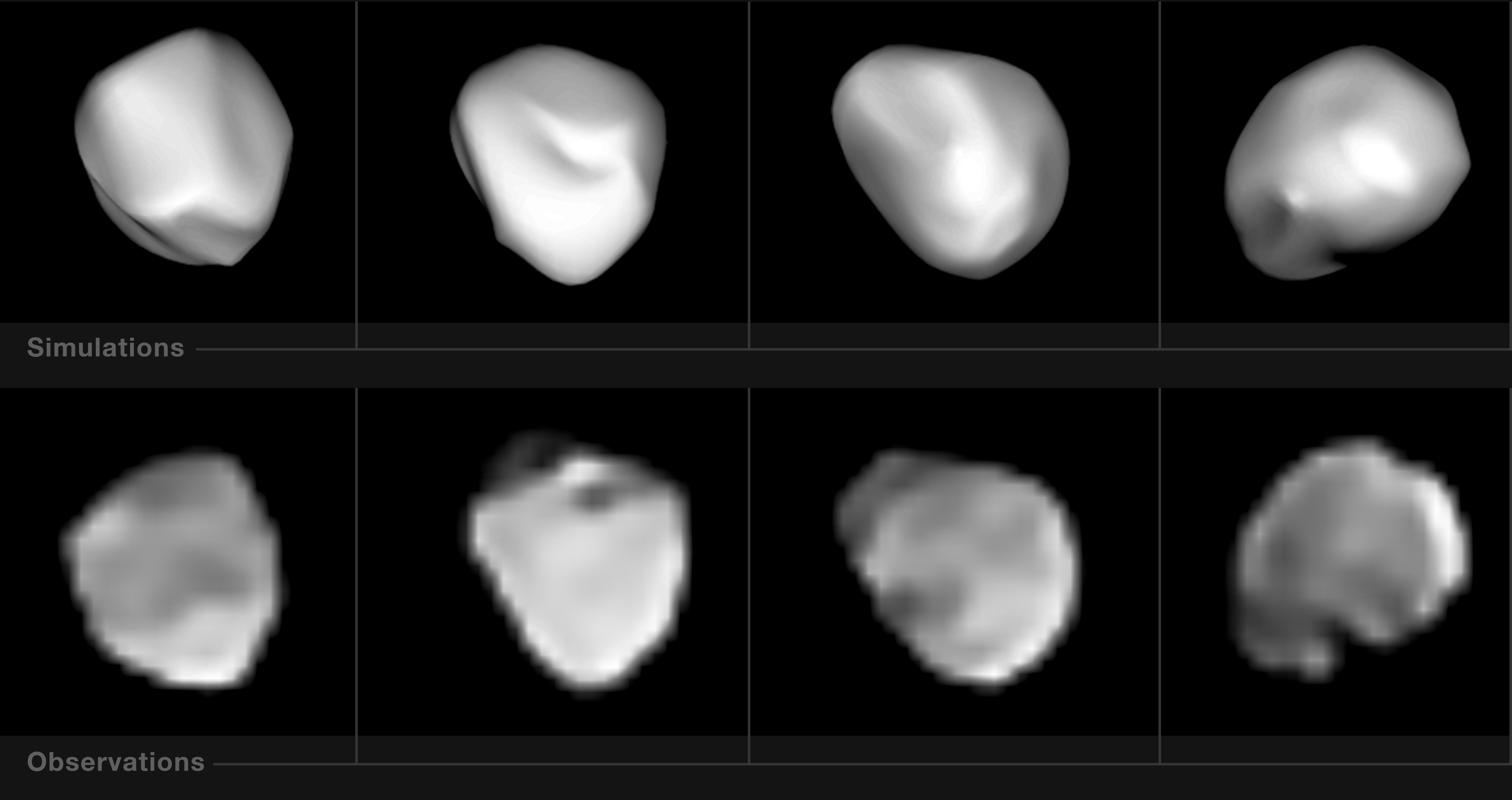
Simulations (top) and direct images (bottom) of 6 Hebe

Size comparison: the first 10 asteroids profiled against the Moon. Hebe is sixth from the left.

Hebe is a large asteroid, with a volume-equivalent spheroidal diameter of 193 ± 6 kilometres (119.9 ± 3.7 mi). Though Hebe's shape approximates an oblate spheroid, it hosts numerous extreme topographical features. Five large depressions have been identified on its surface, possibly representing deep impact craters. The depressions range from around 50 km (31 mi) to over 100 km (62 mi) in size, with depths between 7 and 18 kilometres (4.3 and 11.2 mi). Hebe additionally has a large, flattened face, giving it the appearance of a "lopped-off tooth". This large facet may represent a section of the asteroid that was blasted away into space by an ancient impact event.

Based on Hebe's lightcurve, or variations in its observed brightness, it rotates in a prograde (counterclockwise) direction with a rotation period of 7.27 hours. Its north pole points towards ecliptic coordinates (β, λ) = (50°, 342°) with a 1° or 2° uncertainty.

=== Spectrum and composition ===
Hebe is classified as an S-type asteroid under the Tholen classification scheme. Planetary scientist Michael James Gaffey further subdivided S-type asteroids into seven mineralogical subclasses, categorizing Hebe as an S(IV)-type asteroid. Hebe's S(IV) classification indicates its surface is silicate (or stony) in composition and undifferentiated or partially differentiated.

== See also ==
- List of former planets
