= 1308 Halleria =

Main-belt asteroid

Discovery
- Discovered by: K. Reinmuth
- Discovery site: Heidelberg Obs.
- Discovery date: 12 March 1931

Designations
- Named after: Albrecht von Haller (Swiss physiologist)
- Alternative designations: 1931 EB · 1933 SP; 1936 FU_{1} · 1938 SO_{1} 1938 SP_{1} · 1953 TT; 1963 VA · A901 DB
- Minor planet category: main-belt · (outer); Charis

Orbital characteristics
- Epoch 4 September 2017 (JD 2458000.5)
- Uncertainty parameter 0
- Observation arc: 116.76 yr (42,645 days)
- Aphelion: 2.9438 AU
- Perihelion: 2.8738 AU
- Semi-major axis: 2.9088 AU
- Eccentricity: 0.0120
- Orbital period (sidereal): 4.96 yr (1,812 days)
- Mean anomaly: 173.29°
- Mean motion: 0° 11^{m} 55.32^{s} / day
- Inclination: 5.5766°
- Longitude of ascending node: 354.14°
- Argument of perihelion: 164.00°

Physical characteristics
- Dimensions: 39.33±12.48 km 41.87±10.07 km 43.13 km (derived); 43.16±1.4 km 45.05±0.57 km 46.951±0.275 km 50.046±0.301 km
- Synodic rotation period: 6.013 h (Note: Pray (2011): rotation period 6.013 hours with a brightness amplitude of 0.14 mag. Quality code of 3. Summary figures for (1308) Halleria at the LCDB); 6.026±0.002 h 6.028±0.004 h
- Geometric albedo: 0.0338±0.0116; 0.038±0.009; 0.0415 (derived); 0.042±0.001; 0.0454±0.003; 0.05±0.06; 0.05±0.07
- Spectral type: C (assumed)
- Absolute magnitude (H): 10.80 · 10.9 · 10.95 · 10.97±0.28

1308 Halleria, provisional designation 1931 EB, is a carbonaceous Charis asteroid from the outer regions of the asteroid belt, approximately 43 kilometers in diameter. It was discovered on 12 March 1931, by German astronomer Karl Reinmuth at the Heidelberg-Königstuhl State Observatory. The asteroid was named after Albrecht von Haller a Swiss physician, botanist and poet.

== Orbit and classification ==
Halleria belongs to the carbonaceous Charis family (616), a family of more than 800 members, named after its parent body 627 Charis. It orbits the Sun in the outer main-belt at a distance of 2.87–2.94 AU once every 4 years and 12 months (1,812 days; semi-major axis 2.91 AU). Its orbit has an eccentricity of 0.01 and an inclination of 6° with respect to the ecliptic.

The asteroid was first observed as A901 DB at Heidelberg Observatory in February 1901. The body's observation arc begins with its official discovery observation in March 1931.

== Physical characteristics ==
Halleria is an assumed carbonaceous C-type asteroid, which agrees with the overall spectral type for members of the Charis family.

=== Rotation period ===
Between 2005 and 2011, three rotational lightcurves of Halleria were obtained from photometric observations by Donald Pray, René Roy, and Pierre Antonini (U=3/3-/3). Lightcurve analysis gave a consolidated rotation period of 6.028 hours with a brightness amplitude between 0.14 and 0.17 magnitude.

=== Diameter and albedo ===
According to the surveys carried out by the Infrared Astronomical Satellite IRAS, the Japanese Akari satellite and the NEOWISE mission of NASA's Wide-field Infrared Survey Explorer, Halleria measures between 39.33 and 50.046 kilometers in diameter and its surface has an albedo between 0.0338 and 0.05.

The Collaborative Asteroid Lightcurve Link derives an albedo of 0.0415 and a diameter of 43.13 kilometers based on an absolute magnitude of 10.9.

== Naming ==
This minor planet was named for Albrecht von Haller (1708–1777) a Swiss physician, botanist and poet. The naming took place during the 1935 meeting of the Astronomische Gesellschaft in Bern, Switzerland. The author of the Dictionary of Minor Planet Names learned about the naming circumstances from Dutch astronomer Ingrid van Houten-Groeneveld.
