= Meanings of minor-planet names: 52001–53000 =

As minor planet discoveries are confirmed, they are given a permanent number by the IAU's Minor Planet Center (MPC), and the discoverers can then submit names for them, following the IAU's naming conventions. The list below concerns those minor planets in the specified number-range that have received names, and explains the meanings of those names.

Official naming citations of newly named small Solar System bodies are approved and published in a bulletin by IAU's Working Group for Small Bodies Nomenclature (WGSBN). Before May 2021, citations were published in MPC's Minor Planet Circulars for many decades. Recent citations can also be found on the JPL Small-Body Database (SBDB). Until his death in 2016, German astronomer Lutz D. Schmadel compiled these citations into the Dictionary of Minor Planet Names (DMP) and regularly updated the collection.

Based on Paul Herget's The Names of the Minor Planets, Schmadel also researched the unclear origin of numerous asteroids, most of which had been named prior to World War II. This article incorporates text from this source, which is in the public domain: SBDB New namings may only be added to this list below after official publication as the preannouncement of names is condemned. The WGSBN publishes a comprehensive guideline for the naming rules of non-cometary small Solar System bodies.

== 52001–52100 ==
Named minor planet	Provisional	This minor planet was named for...	Ref · Catalog
52005 Maik	2002 CL_{13}	Maik Meyer (born 1970), German amateur astronomer	MPC · 52005
52008 Johnnaka	2002 EP_{111}	John Yoshio Naka (1914–2004), the preeminent American bonsai master of the late 20th century.	JPL · 52008
52030 Maxvasile	2002 PX_{33}	Massimiliano Vasile (born 1970) is a professor of Space Systems Engineering at the University of Strathclyde. He has developed innovative techniques for the design and optimization of space trajectories and is an astrodynamics expert. He is leader of the EuTN STARDUST project on asteroid and space debris monitoring and mitigation..	JPL · 52030
52057 Clarkhowell	2002 PS_{130}	Francis Clark Howell (1925–2007), generally known as "F. Clark Howell", was an American anthropologist.	JPL · 52057

== 52101–52200 ==
back to top

Named minor planet	Provisional	This minor planet was named for...	Ref · Catalog
There are no named minor planets in this number range

== 52201–52300 ==
back to top

Named minor planet	Provisional	This minor planet was named for...	Ref · Catalog
52225 Panchenko	1968 OF_{1}	Vladislav Yakovlevich Panchenko (born 1947), an authority in laser information technologies, scientific instrumentation technologies, non-linear optics and medical physics.	JPL · 52225
52226 Saenredam	1974 PA	Pieter Jansz. Saenredam (1597–1665), Dutch Baroque-era painter and engraver	JPL · 52226
52228 Protos	1977 RN	Greek word for "first", the discoverer's first minor planet detection	JPL · 52228
52231 Sitnik	1978 RX_{1}	Grigorij Fedorovich Sitnik (1911–1996), professor of the Moscow State University.	JPL · 52231
52242 Michelemaoret	1981 EX	Michele Maoret (born 1971), a mathematics teacher and president of the association of scientific education 'Luigi Lagrange', which is involved in the teaching of physics, mathematics and astronomy.	JPL · 52242
52246 Donaldjohanson	1981 EQ_{5}	Donald Johanson (born 1943), an American paleoanthropologist who discovered the fossil of a female hominin australopithecine known as "Lucy".	JPL · 52246
52260 Ureshino	1982 KA	Ureshino, a city located in Saga prefecture, Kyushu island, Japan	JPL · 52260
52261 Izumishikibu	1982 VL_{4}	Izumi Shikibu (born c. 976) was a Japanese poet from the 11th century Heian period. She wrote Izumi Shikibu Nikki, which was a notable diary containing waka poems about her affairs with the Imperial Prince. It is said that she was born in Shiroishi district and spent her younger days in Shiota in Saga Prefecture, Japan.	JPL · 52261
52263 Rustamov	1985 QD_{6}	Rustam B. Rustamov (born 1955), Azerbaijani scientist and researcher, is noted for his contributions to the development of Azerbaijan’s space industry and for his work in Remote Sensing and Geographic Information Systems, advancing applications of space technology and geospatial science.	JPL · 52263
52266 Van Flandern	1986 AD	Tom Van Flandern (1940–2009), astronomer and lunar occultations analylist at the U.S. Naval Observatory in the 1970s	JPL · 52266
52267 Rotarytorino	1986 EP_{2}	The "Rotary Club Torino", the third oldest Rotary Club in Italy and from its foundation in 1925 has contributed with its services to the development of science and technology, the most important enterprises in the Piedmont scientific and industrial area.	JPL · 52267
52270 Noamchomsky	1988 CH_{5}	Noam Chomsky (born 1928), an American linguist and philosopher.	JPL · 52270
52271 Lecorbusier	1988 RP_{3}	Le Corbusier (Charles-Edouard Jeanneret, 1887–1965), Swiss-French architect and city planner	JPL · 52271
52285 Kakurinji	1990 OX_{2}	Kakurinji, built by Prince Shotoku in AD 589, is a historically significant Buddhist temple complex in Kakogawa city, Hyogo prefecture.	JPL · 52285
52291 Mott	1990 TU_{1}	John R. Mott (1865–1955), American organizer of the modern ecumenical movement and Peace Prize Nobelist	JPL · 52291
52292 Kamdzhalov	1990 TB_{2}	Yordan Kamdzhalov (born 1980), Bulgarian conductor.	JPL · 52292
52293 Mommsen	1990 TQ_{3}	Theodor Mommsen (1817–1903), German classical historian, epigraphist, and Nobelist	JPL · 52293
52294 Detlef	1990 TJ_{4}	Detlef Ninnemann (born 1944), a German patent attorney and electrical engineer.	JPL · 52294
52295 Köppen	1990 VK_{4}	Wladimir Köppen (1846–1940), a Russian-German botanist-climatologist.	JPL · 52295

== 52301–52400 ==
back to top

Named minor planet	Provisional	This minor planet was named for...	Ref · Catalog
52301 Qumran	1991 RQ_{2}	Qumran, Palestine, where the Dead Sea Scrolls were found	JPL · 52301
52308 Hanspeterröser	1991 TE_{3}	Hans-Peter Röser (born 1949), director of the Institute of Space Studies at the University of Stuttgart.	JPL · 52308
52309 Philnicolai	1991 TQ_{7}	Philipp Nicolai, German Lutheran pastor and poet, author of the hymns Wachet auf, ruft uns die Stimme (Wake, awake! for night is flying) and Wie schön leuchtet der Morgenstern (How brightly beams the morning star!)	JPL · 52309
52316 Daveslater	1992 BD	David C. Slater (1957–2011), a U.S. physicist with Southwest Research Institute.	JPL · 52316
52334 Oberammergau	1992 FS_{3}	Oberammergau, Bavaria, Germany, festival place of a famous Passion Play	JPL · 52334
52337 Compton	1992 RS	Arthur Holly Compton, American physicist and Nobelist	JPL · 52337
52341 Ballmann	1992 SB_{2}	Helga Ballmann (born 1954), the personal assistant of the Director of the Astronomisches Rechen-Institut, Heidelberg. JPL	MPC · 52341
52344 Yehudimenuhin	1992 YM_{1}	Yehudi Menuhin (1916–1999), an American-born violinist and conductor, is considered one of the greatest violinists of the 20th century.	JPL · 52344
52384 Elenapanko	1993 HZ_{5}	Elena Alekseevna Panko (born 1958), a Ukrainian astronomer at Nikolaev State University	JPL · 52384
52387 Huitzilopochtli	1993 OM_{7}	Huitzilopochtli is an Aztec god associated with the Sun. His name, meaning "hummingbird of the south" came from the Aztec belief that the spirits of killed warriors followed the Sun through the sky during four subsequent years. Thereafter they were transformed into hummingbirds.	JPL · 52387

== 52401–52500 ==
back to top

Named minor planet	Provisional	This minor planet was named for...	Ref · Catalog
52421 Daihoji	1994 LA	Daihōji, north of Kumakōgen, Japan, 44th destination of the Shikoku Pilgrimage	JPL · 52421
52422 LPL	1994 LP	The University of Arizona's Lunar and Planetary Laboratory	JPL · 52422
52426 Ritaalessandro	1994 PF	Rita Alessandro (b. 1989), an Italian amateur astronomer.	IAU · 52426
52455 Masamika	1995 AD_{1}	Masa-aki Takanashi (1959–2001) and his wife Mika, Japanese amateur astronomers	JPL · 52455
52457 Enquist	1995 AE_{4}	Anna Enquist (born 1945), a Dutch author and poet, who studied psycho-analysis at Leiden and piano at the conservatory of Den Haag.	JPL · 52457
52480 Enzomora	1995 UM_{5}	Gian Vincenzo Mora, Italian amateur astronomer	JPL · 52480
52487 Huazhongkejida	1995 XO_{2}	The Chinese Huazhong University of Science and Technology (Huazhongkejida or HUST) is a research university located in Wuhan, Hubei province. It was the first university in central China to establish an Astronomy Department.	IAU · 52487
52500 Kanata	1996 DC_{1}	KANATA, Japanese for "Far Away", name of the new 1.5-m telescope of Hiroshima University	JPL · 52500

== 52501–52600 ==
back to top

Named minor planet	Provisional	This minor planet was named for...	Ref · Catalog
52524 Pikador	1996 PH	Pikador is a well-known local term from České Budějovice that has been used for over fifty years to describe a specific kind of hot dog.	IAU · 52524
52558 Pigafetta	1997 FR	Antonio Pigafetta (c. 1492—c. 1531) was an Italian navigator and geographer. He participated in the first circumnavigation of the globe from 1519 to 1522.	JPL · 52558
52570 Lauraco	1997 JC_{1}	Laura Colombini (born 1986), a European Languages and Cultures graduate of the University of Modena, Italy, is the first daughter of one of the co-discoverers of this minor planet.	IAU · 52570
52589 Montviloff	1997 PY_{3}	Nicolas Montviloff, French co-founder of the Observatoire des Pises, and current president of the Société astronomique de Montpellier, France	JPL · 52589

== 52601–52700 ==
back to top

Named minor planet	Provisional	This minor planet was named for...	Ref · Catalog
52601 Iwayaji	1997 SJ_{16}	Iwaya-ji, east of Kumakōgen, Japan, 45th destination of the Shikoku Pilgrimage	JPL · 52601
52602 Floriansignoret	1997 TY_{5}	Florian Signoret (b. 1983), a French computer scientist and amateur astronomer.	IAU · 52602
52604 Thomayer	1997 TZ_{9}	Josef Thomayer (1853–1927), Czech professor of internal medicine at the Charles University of Prague	JPL · 52604
52633 Turvey	1997 WL_{23}	Barry Sydney Turvey (born 1950) has devoted many years to the cause of popularizing astronomy in the UK, as Membership Secretary, Merchandising Manager and Council Member of the Society for Popular Astronomy.	JPL · 52633
52649 Chrismith	1997 YX_{11}	Christine Elizabeth Smith, American elementary school teacher	JPL · 52649
52655 Villermaux	1998 AF_{6}	Jacques Villermaux (1935–1997), a French amateur astronomer and Professor of Chemical Engineering.	IAU · 52655
52665 Brianmay	1998 BM_{30}	Brian May, British astrophysicist, chancellor of Liverpool John Moores University, and lead guitarist and songwriter for the rock group Queen	JPL · 52665
52670 Alby	1998 DC_{3}	Alberto ("Alby") Colombini (born 1989) is a graduate accountant, employed in a transport company, and an amateur soccer player. He is the second son of one of the co-discoverers of this minor planet.	IAU · 52670
52681 Kelleghan	1998 DK_{34}	Deirdre Kelleghan (born 1957) is an Irish astronomer, artist and educator. She invents, designs and enacts creative workshops to help children understand the Solar System through drawing. Her activities take place in schools, libraries, science centres and observatories throughout Ireland.	JPL · 52681
52691 Maryrobinettek	1998 FC_{6}	Mary Robinette Kowal (b. 1969), an American science fiction writer and puppeteer.	IAU · 52691
52692 Johnscalzi	1998 FO_{8}	John Michael Scalzi, American science fiction writer.	IAU · 52692

== 52701–52800 ==
back to top

Named minor planet	Provisional	This minor planet was named for...	Ref · Catalog
52703 Bernardleblanc	1998 FW_{72}	Bernard Leblanc (1941–2015), a French professor at the École nationale supérieure Louis-Lumière in Paris.	IAU · 52703
52767 Ophelestes	1998 MW_{41}	Ophelestes, a Trojan warrior, was killed by an arrow of Teucer, who was causing much havoc with his bow amongst the ranks of the Trojans.	JPL · 52767

== 52801–52900 ==
back to top

Named minor planet	Provisional	This minor planet was named for...	Ref · Catalog
52860 Méganediet	1998 SX	Mégane Diet (b. 1988), a French Optical Ground Station engineer at Centre National d'Études Spatiales, the French Space Agency.	IAU · 52860
52872 Okyrhoe	1998 SG_{35}	Okyrhoe, mythological daughter of Chiron and Chariklo	JPL · 52872
52873 Grootaerd	1998 SP_{35}	Jean-Pierre Grootaerd (born 1956), Belgian amateur astronomer.	JPL · 52873

== 52901–53000 ==
back to top

Named minor planet	Provisional	This minor planet was named for...	Ref · Catalog
52959 Danieladepaulis	1998 TY_{2}	Daniela de Paulis (b. 1969), a French media artist and Artist in Residence at the SETI Institute. Founder and Director of the global project A Sign in Space.	IAU · 52959
52963 Vercingetorix	1998 TB_{16}	Vercingetorix (ca. 82 BC – 46 BC) was a King of the Arverni and military leader of the Celtic people against the Roman invasion of Gaul (today's France). He beat Julius Caesar's forces at the Battle of Gergovia (52 BCE), but surrendered during the battle of Alesia, in part presumably because of superstitions related to the lunar eclipse of 26 Sep. 52 BCE.	JPL · 52963
52965 Laurencebentz	1998 TK_{17}	Laurence Bentz (b. 1958), a French medical doctor.	IAU · 52965
52975 Cyllarus	1998 TF_{35}	Cyllarus, mythological centaur.	JPL · 52975
52982 Marieclaire	1998 UY_{15}	Marie-Claire Hainaut (née Rouelle, b. 1965), a Belgian physicist and painter.	IAU · 52982

back to top

Preceded by 51,001–52,000	Meanings of minor-planet names List of minor planets: 52,001–53,000	Succeeded by 53,001–54,000
