= (33128) 1998 BU48 =

Trans-Neptunian object and centaur

(33128) 1998 BU_{48}
Discovery
- Discovered by: Nichole M. Danzl
- Discovery site: Kitt Peak
- Discovery date: 22 January 1998

Designations
- Minor planet category: TNO · centaur · distant

Orbital characteristics
- Epoch 17 October 2024
- Aphelion: 46.081 AU
- Perihelion: 20.405 AU
- Semi-major axis: 33.243 AU
- Eccentricity: 0.3861
- Orbital period (sidereal): 277.06 yr (70,004 d)
- Mean anomaly: 88.170°
- Mean motion: 0.000514°/d
- Inclination: 10°
- Longitude of ascending node: 132.72°
- Time of perihelion: 17 November 1977
- Argument of perihelion: 282.28°
- Earth MOID: 19.447 AU
- Jupiter MOID: 15.559 AU
- T_{Jupiter}: 4.676

Physical characteristics
- Mean diameter: 213 km
- Synodic rotation period: 12.6 h
- Geometric albedo: 0.052
- Spectral type: RR
- Absolute magnitude (H): 6.93

(33128) 1998 BU_{48} is a trans-Neptunian object and centaur from the outer Solar System. It has an aphelion of 46.081 AU and perihelion of 20.405 AU. It was discovered on 22 January 1998 by Nichole M. Danzl at Kitt Peak. It measures 213 km in diameter.

== See also ==
- (33001) 1997 CU29
- (33340) 1998 VG44
- (44594) 1999 OX3
- List of trans-Neptunian objects
