= Ronald Hellings =

American theoretical astrophysicist (1944–2022)

Ronald Wald Hellings
- Born: 23 January 1944; Los Angeles, California
- Died: 1 January 2022 (aged 77); Bozeman, Montana
- Education: Brigham Young University (BS); UCLA (MS); Montana State University (PhD)
- Occupations: Professor, research scientist
- Scientific career
- Fields: Theoretical astrophysics
- Workplaces: Southern Oregon University, UNLV, Cal Poly Pomona, Harvey Mudd, JPL, MSU

Ronald Ward Hellings (23 January 1944 – 1 January 2022) was an American theoretical astrophysicist at Jet Propulsion Laboratory and Montana State University, best known for the Hellings–Downs curve he co-derived with George Downs for detecting the stochastic gravitational wave background using pulsar timing arrays. Hellings' research focused on gravitational wave astronomy and astrophysical tests for modifications to general relativity.

== Career ==
In 1983, Hellings and George Downs derived the Hellings–Downs curve.

Hellings also sought to improve astrophysical constraints on deviations from general relativity. In response to a 1974 analysis of lunar motion by Tom Van Flandern which claimed to detect a decreasing gravitational constant, in 1983 Hellings led an analysis of Earth-Mars distance data from the Viking landers which found a null result in tension with Van Flandern. Hellings also used the Viking data to estimate the masses of Ceres, Pallas, and Vesta from their gravitational effects on Mars.

Hellings was the NASA program scientist for the Joint Dark Energy Mission proposal, which evolved into the Nancy Grace Roman Space Telescope.

== Selected publications ==
- Hellings, R. W.; Downs, G. S. (1983-02-01). "Upper limits on the isotropic gravitational radiation background from pulsar timing analysis". The Astrophysical Journal. 265: L39. doi:10.1086/183954.
- Backer, D. C.; Hellings, R. W. (1986). "Pulsar Timing and General Relativity". Annual Review of Astronomy and Astrophysics. 24. Annual Reviews: 537–575. doi:10.1146/annurev.aa.24.090186.002541.
