= Nichole M. Danzl =

American astronomer

Minor planets discovered: 6
see § List of discovered minor planets

Nichole M. Danzl is an American astronomer and biologist who has discovered several trans-Neptunian objects while working with the Spacewatch survey.

== Career ==
Danzl studied biology at the University of Arizona. She is a research scientist, at the Columbia University Medical Center. Between 1995 and 1998, she discovered a total of six minor planets, as part of her work on the Spacewatch program.

=== List of discovered minor planets ===
| (24835) 1995 SM55 | 19 September 1995 | list |
| (26181) 1996 GQ_{21} | 12 April 1996 | list |
| (26308) 1998 SM165 | 16 September 1998 | list |
| (33128) 1998 BU48 | 22 January 1998 | list |
| (33340) 1998 VG44 | 14 November 1998 | list^{[A]} |
| 52975 Cyllarus | 12 October 1998 | list |
Co-discovery made with: ^{A} J. A. Larsen and A. Gleason

== Honors and awards ==
Asteroid 10720 Danzl, discovered by astronomers with the Spacewatch survey at Kitt Peak Observatory in 1986, was named after her. The official naming citation was published by the Minor Planet Center on 9 May 2001 (M.P.C. 42671).

== Works ==
- Donlin, Laura T.; Danzl, Nichole M.; Wanjalla, Celestine; Alexandropoulos, Konstantina (December 15, 2005). "Deficiency in Expression of the Signaling Protein Sin/Efs Leads to T-Lymphocyte Activation and Mucosal Inflammation". Molecular and Cellular Biology. 25 (24). American Society for Microbiology: 11035–11046. doi:10.1128/mcb.25.24.11035-11046.2005. ISSN 0270-7306. PMC 1316950. PMID 16314525.
- PMC, Europe (2021). "Lymphohematopoietic graft-versus-host responses promote mixed chimerism in patients receiving intestinal transplantation". The Journal of Clinical Investigation. 131 (8) 141698. doi:10.1172/JCI141698. PMC 8062082. PMID 33630757.
- Larsen, Jeffrey A.; Gleason, Arianna E.; Danzl, Nichole M.; Descour, Anne S.; McMillan, Robert S.; Gehrels, Tom; Jedicke, Robert; Montani, Joseph L.; Scotti, James V. (2001). "The Spacewatch Wide-Area Survey for Bright Centaurs and Trans-Neptunian Objects". The Astronomical Journal. 121 (1). American Astronomical Society: 562–579. Bibcode:2001AJ....121..562L. doi:10.1086/318022. ISSN 0004-6256.
- "Tissue-Resident Memory T Cells Mediate Immune Homeostasis in the Human Pancreas through the PD-1/PD-L1 Pathway". clic. Archived from the original on October 26, 2021.
- Echeverria, Adriana P.; Cohn, Ian S.; Danko, David C.; Shanaj, Sara; Blair, Lily; Hollemon, Desiree; Carli, Alberto V.; Sculco, Peter K.; Ho, Carine; Meshulam-Simon, Galit; Mironenko, Christine (September 15, 2021). "Sequencing of Circulating Microbial Cell-Free DNA Can Identify Pathogens in Periprosthetic Joint Infections". The Journal of Bone and Joint Surgery. American Volume. 103 (18): 1705–1712. doi:10.2106/JBJS.20.02229. ISSN 1535-1386. PMID 34293751. S2CID 236199023.
