= (26308) 1998 SM165 =

Trans-Neptunian binary

(26308) 1998 SM_{165}
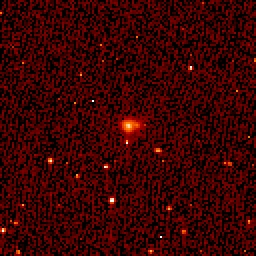
- Hubble Space Telescope image of 1998 SM_{165} and its companion, taken in December 2001

Discovery
- Discovered by: N. Danzl
- Discovery site: Kitt Peak Obs.
- Discovery date: 16 September 1998

Designations
- Minor planet category: TNO · twotino Kozai · distant

Orbital characteristics
- Epoch 4 September 2017 (JD 2458000.5)
- Uncertainty parameter 2
- Observation arc: 32.26 yr (11,784 days)
- Earliest precovery date: 12 October 1982
- Aphelion: 64.968 AU
- Perihelion: 29.866 AU
- Semi-major axis: 47.417 AU
- Eccentricity: 0.3701
- Orbital period (sidereal): 326.52 yr (119,261 days)
- Mean anomaly: 47.484°
- Mean motion: 0° 0^{m} 10.8^{s} / day
- Inclination: 13.521°
- Longitude of ascending node: 183.21°
- Argument of perihelion: 130.22°
- Known satellites: 1 (96±12 km in diameter)

Physical characteristics
- Dimensions: 268±28 km (derived); 287±36 km
- Mass: (6.87±0.018)×10^{18} kg
- Mean density: 0.51+0.29 −0.14 g/cm^{3}
- Synodic rotation period: 8.40±0.05 h
- Geometric albedo: 0.07±0.02
- Absolute magnitude (H): 5.7

(26308) 1998 SM_{165} is a resonant trans-Neptunian object and binary system from the Kuiper belt in the outermost regions of the Solar System. It was discovered on 16 September 1998, by American astronomer Nichole Danzl at the Kitt Peak National Observatory in Arizona. It is classified as a twotino and measures approximately 280 kilometers in diameter. Its minor-planet moon was discovered in 2001.

== Twotino ==
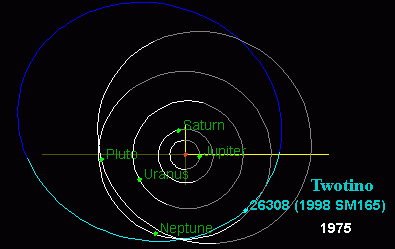
The orbit of 1998 SM_{165} compared to Pluto and Neptune

1998 SM_{165} has a semi-major axis (average distance from the Sun) near the edge of the classical belt. The Deep Ecliptic Survey (DES) list this trans-Neptunian object as a twotino that stays in a 1:2 orbital resonance with the planet Neptune (for every one orbit that a twotino makes, Neptune orbits twice).

== Physical characteristics ==
The observations with the infrared Spitzer Space Telescope combined with the orbits established using the Hubble Space Telescope allow the estimation of the density, assuming the components have an equal albedo.

The resulting estimate of 0.51+0.29
−0.14 g/cm^{3} is similar to the density of the binary plutino 47171 Lempo (0.3–0.8 g/cm^{3}) and Saturn's moon Hyperion (0.567±0.102 g/cm^{3}) Such a low density is indicative of a highly porous composition dominated by ice.

1998 SM_{165} is fairly red, with a color comparable to 79360 Sila–Nunam.

== Satellite ==
On 22 December 2001, a minor-planet moon was discovered by American astronomers Michael Brown and Chad Trujillo using the Hubble Space Telescope. The discovery was announced in January 2002. The satellite measures approximately 96 ± 12 km (59.7 ± 7.5 mi) in diameter and orbits its primary at a distance of 11,310 ± 110 km (7,028 ± 68 mi). Assuming a circular orbit, this takes 130.1±1 days to complete one orbit.

== Numbering and naming ==
This minor planet was numbered by the Minor Planet Center on 5 July 2001. As of 2025, it has not been named.
