= 52975 Cyllarus =

Very red centaur

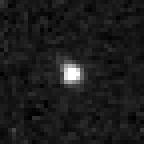
- Hubble Space Telescope image of Cyllarus taken in 2010

Discovery
- Discovered by: N. Danzl
- Discovery site: Kitt Peak National Obs.
- Discovery date: 12 October 1998

Designations
- Pronunciation: /ˈsɪlərəs/
- Named after: Cyllarus (Greek mythology)
- Alternative designations: 1998 TF_{35}
- Minor planet category: centaur · distant
- Symbol: (astrological)

Orbital characteristics
- Epoch 4 September 2017 (JD 2458000.5)
- Uncertainty parameter 4
- Observation arc: 9.95 yr (3,636 days)
- Aphelion: 35.971 AU
- Perihelion: 16.254 AU
- Semi-major axis: 26.113 AU
- Eccentricity: 0.3775
- Orbital period (sidereal): 133.44 yr (48,739 days)
- Mean anomaly: 75.673°
- Mean motion: 0° 0^{m} 26.64^{s} / day
- Inclination: 12.651°
- Longitude of ascending node: 52.073°
- Argument of perihelion: 300.77°
- T_{Jupiter}: 4.2470

Physical characteristics
- Dimensions: 62 km
- Geometric albedo: 0.115
- Spectral type: RR; B–V = 1.096±0.095; V–R = 0.680±0.085
- Apparent magnitude: 23.93
- Absolute magnitude (H): 9.4

52975 Cyllarus /ˈsɪlərəs/ (provisional designation 1998 TF_{35}) is a very red centaur, approximately 62 kilometers (39 miles) in diameter, orbiting the Sun in the outer Solar System. It was discovered on 12 October 1998, by American astronomer Nichole Danzl at the Kitt Peak National Observatory near Sells, Arizona, in the United States. It was later named after the mythological centaur Cyllarus.

== Orbit and classification ==
Cyllarus as seen by the Keck telescope at an apparent magnitude of 23

Cyllarus orbits the Sun in the outer main-belt at a distance of 16.3–36.0 AU once every 133 years and 5 months (48,739 days). Its orbit has an eccentricity of 0.38 and an inclination of 13° with respect to the ecliptic. Cyllarus came to perihelion in September 1989. The body's observation arc begins with its official discovery observation at Kitt Peak, as no precoveries were taken, and no prior identifications were made.

== Naming ==
This minor planet was named for the Cyllarus, a centaur of Greek mythology. The official naming citation was published by the Minor Planet Center on 14 June 2003 (M.P.C. 49102).

A symbol derived from that for 2060 Chiron,, was devised in the late 1990s by German astrologer Robert von Heeren. It replaces Chiron's K with a CY for Cyllarus.

== Physical characteristics ==
As of 2017, no rotational lightcurve has been obtained from photometric observations. The body's rotation period and shape, as well as its spectral type remains unknown. Cyllarus measures approximately 62 kilometers (39 miles) in diameter, for an albedo of 0.115. It is a red centaur with (RR), and has an absolute magnitude of 9.4.

== See also ==
- List of centaurs (small Solar System bodies) § 52975
