= (33340) 1998 VG44 =

Trans-Neptunian object

(33340) 1998 VG_{44}
- Orbit diagram of its orbit.

Discovery
- Discovered by: J. A. Larsen; N. Danzel; A. Gleason
- Discovery date: 14 November 1998

Designations
- Minor planet category: plutino

Orbital characteristics
- Epoch 9 June 2026 (JD 2461200.5)
- Uncertainty parameter 1
- Observation arc: 27.25 years
- Aphelion: 49.8 AU
- Perihelion: 29.38 AU
- Semi-major axis: 39.59 AU
- Eccentricity: 0.25786
- Orbital period (sidereal): 249.1 yr (90986 d)
- Mean anomaly: 17.74°
- Mean motion: 0° 0^{m} 14.357^{s} / day
- Inclination: 3.034°
- Longitude of ascending node: 127.96°
- Argument of perihelion: 324.79°
- Uranus MOID: 10.38 AU (1.55 billion km)
- Neptune MOID: 0.054 AU (8.08 million km) (Note: A strong 3:2 resonance with Neptune prevents 1998 VG_{44} from getting this close.)

Physical characteristics
- Dimensions: 248 km (assumed)
- Geometric albedo: 0.09 (assumed)
- Absolute magnitude (H): 6.4

(33340) 1998 VG_{44} is a trans-Neptunian object. It has a 2:3 orbital resonance with the planet Neptune, similar to Pluto, classifying it as a plutino. Its average distance from the Sun is 39.6 AU with a perihelion of 29.4 AU and an aphelion at 49.8 AU. Its orbit has an eccentricity of 0.26, and is inclined by 3°. The object is estimated to be about 248 km in diameter. It was discovered on 14 November 1998, by J. A. Larsen, Nicole M. Danzl and A. Gleason at the Steward Observatory.

Though it has a Neptune MOID of 0.054 AU (8.08 million km), it can not get that close to Neptune because of the 3:2 resonance with Neptune.

Neptune MOID at different epochs
Epoch	Neptune MOID
2024-10-17	0.0097 AU (1.45 million km)
2026-06-09	0.054 AU (8.08 million km)
