= Iwaya-ji, Ehime =

- 岩屋寺
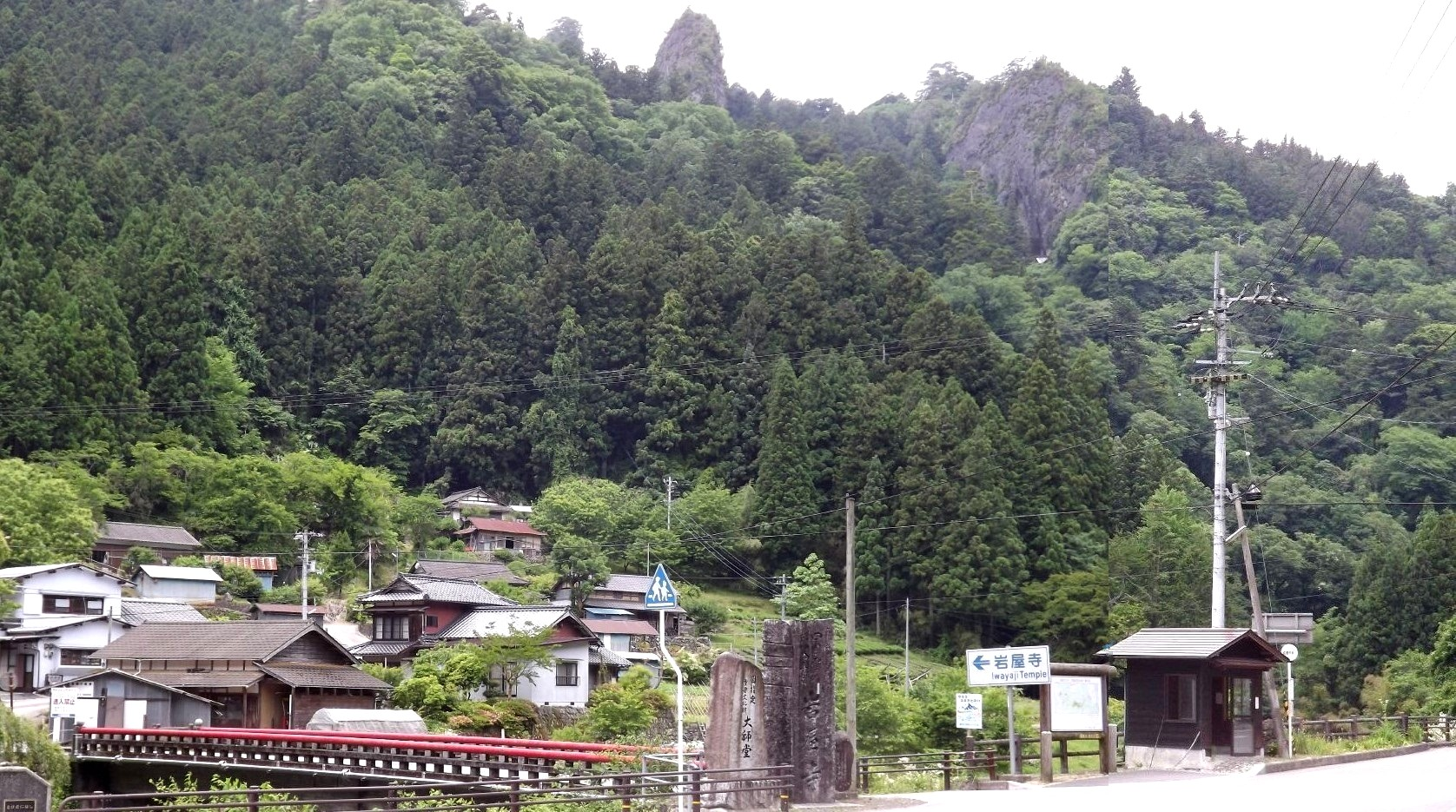
- View from the entrance to the prefectural road

Religion
- Affiliation: Buddhism
- Sect: Shingon-shū Buzan-ha
- Prefecture: Ehime Prefecture
- Deity: Fudō Myōō

Location
- Country: Japan
- Interactive map of Iwaya-ji, Ehime
- Prefecture: Ehime Prefecture

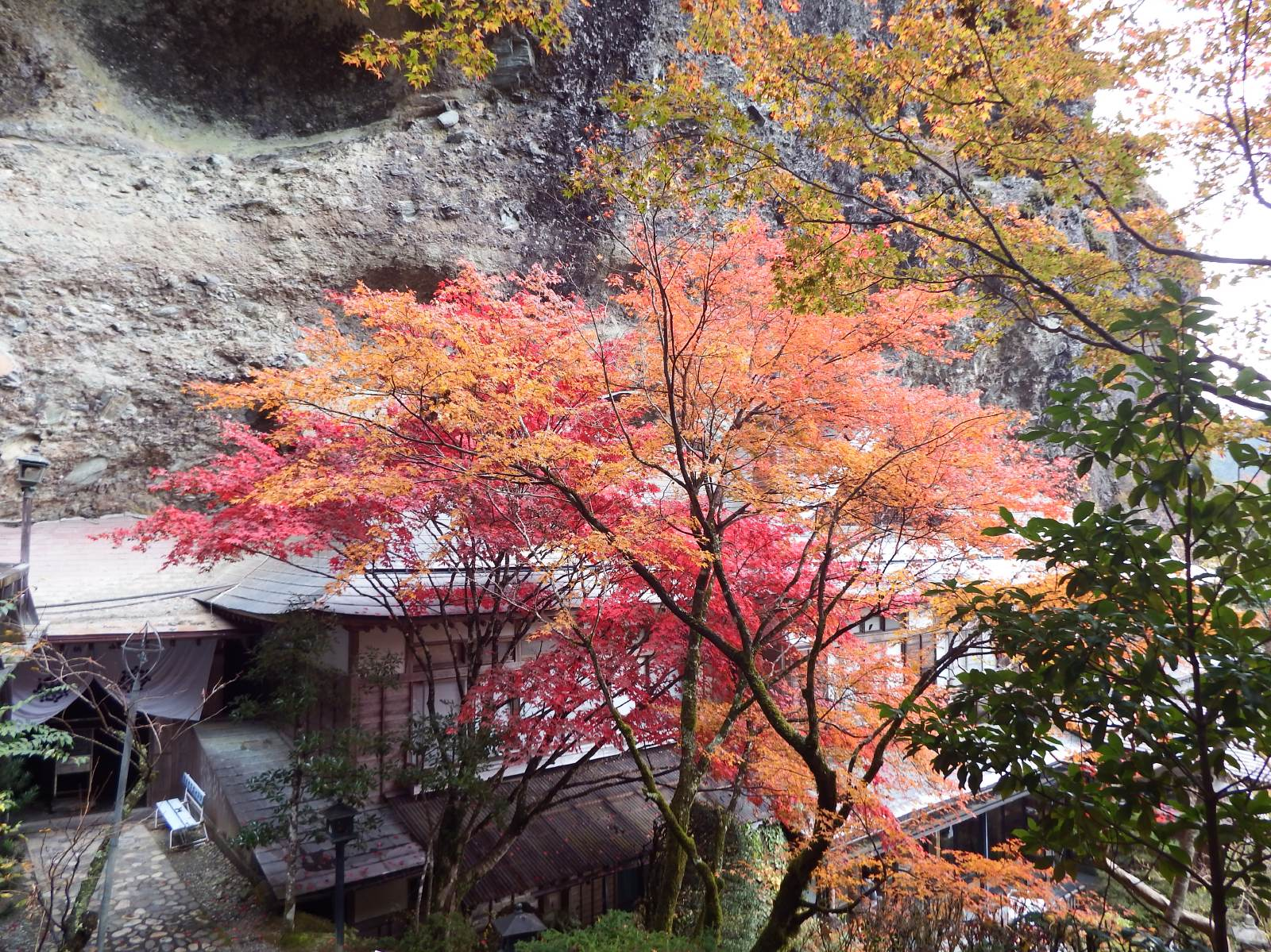
Main Priory

Iwaya-ji (Japanese: 岩屋寺) is a Buddhist temple belonging to the Shingon-shū Buzan-ha sect, located in Nanatori, Kumakogen Town, Kamiukena District, Ehime Prefecture. Its sangō (mountain name) is Kaiganzan. The principal deity is Fudō Myōō. It is the 45th temple on the Shikoku Pilgrimage of 88 Temples.

== Overview ==
The temple grounds are situated at an elevation of approximately 565 meters. In terms of the location of its Main Hall, it ranks as the fourth-highest among the 88 temples of the Shikoku Pilgrimage; consequently, it represents the greatest challenge for pilgrims traveling by car—even those who utilize vehicular transport to the fullest extent must still hike up the approach path for nearly 30 minutes to reach the site. Along the approach, countless stone Buddha statues are stacked one atop another. The temple precincts are flanked by towering conglomerate peaks—known as the Kongōkai Peak to the right (facing the mountain) and the Taizō Peak to the left—while the temple buildings themselves appear to be embedded directly into the face of a massive rock cliff, creating a sacred mountain sanctuary that evokes the atmosphere of a divine, ethereal realm. Notably, the Main Hall is smaller in size than the Daishi Hall (Founder's Hall) because the entire mountain itself is revered as the principal object of worship.

On the 21st day of the third lunar month, the temple observes its annual festival day. On this occasion, vehicular access is prohibited beyond the bridge leading from the prefectural road; instead, visitors must park in designated lots on the opposite side of the road, and the entire village community turns out to assist with the festivities. The event features *Goma* fire rituals, *Mikage-ku* memorial services, and a traditional *Mochi-maki* (rice cake scattering) ceremony. Additionally, the festival includes the ceremonial unveiling of the statue of Kōbō Daishi and the *Ana-zenjō Omizu Kuyō*—a ritual offering of water performed within the sacred cave sanctuary.

== Temple grounds ==
Listed in the order encountered when ascending from the direction of the private paid parking lot.

- Stone Pillar Gate: Small statues of the Kongō Rikishi (Nio Guardians) stand atop the stone pillars.
- Mountain Gate (Sanmon): Built in 1934 (Showa 9). Located partway up the steep approach path; stone steps continue further ahead.
- Statues of the "Welcoming Daishi" and Fudō Myōō: Pilgrims unable to reach the Main Hall may offer their prayers here and ask their companions to handle the *Nōkyō* (pilgrimage stamp book) registration on their behalf.
- Gokuraku Bridge
- Nozomi Miroku* (Maitreya of Hope) Stone Statue: Sheltered beneath a simple roof structure.
- Kokūzō Bosatsu Hall (Shrine): Built in 1747 (Enkyō 4).
- Stone Statues of the *Shusui Daishi*, the "Path-Opening" Fudō-son, and Benzaiten of the Cave.
- Bell Tower
- Mizuko Jizō-son (Cast-Bronze Statue): Sheltered beneath a simple roof structure.
- Haiku Monument: A stone monument inscribed with the haiku by Masaoka Shiki—"Summer mountains... Temple No. 45 is Iwaya-ji"—stands in front of the Nōkyō (pilgrimage registration) office.
- Ana-Zenjō (Water Offering Sanctuary): A cave approximately 20 meters deep lies directly beneath the Main Hall. Enshrined within its depths are stone statues of Jizō-son (for ancestral memorial services), *Kanaeru* Fudō (the Wish-Granting Fudō), and Kōbō Daishi; water springs forth from beneath the Jizō statue.
- Main Hall: Completed in 1927 (Showa 2). The principal image (*Honzon*) is a *Hibutsu* (secret Buddha) and is not on public display; however, visitors may view the *Maedachi* (stand-in image)—a seated statue of Fudō Myōō—as well as the flanking attendants: the red Seitaka Dōji and the white Kongara Dōji.
- Daishi Hall: An Important Cultural Property. (Refer to the "Cultural Properties" section for details.)
- Site of the *Hokke Sennin* Cave: Located at the top of a ladder situated to the right of the Main Hall.
- Amida Cave: Located further up and to the left of the *Sennin* Cave. It houses the "Flying Buddha" (a standing statue of Amida Nyorai—a bronze figure measuring just over four *shaku* in height—holding a small drum in its hand).
- Nio Gate: Located on the main approach path (Omote-sandō), facing pilgrims arriving via the *Hacchō-zaka pilgrimage trail. Completed in 1790 (Kansei 2). This structure was built to serve a dual purpose: as a bell tower and as a remote worship site for the Cave Amida Nyorai (the "Flying Buddha" mentioned above). When offering prayers from the inner right-hand corner—as viewed from the Daishido (Great Master's Hall)—one can obtain an excellent view of the Flying Buddha.

Regarding parking: A lot designated for microbuses, RVs, and larger vehicles is located on the side of the prefectural road opposite the temple (note that vehicles of this size cannot proceed past the bridge, as their roofs would strike the eaves of nearby private homes). For standard-sized cars and smaller vehicles, parking is available in two locations: one approximately 100 meters past the red bridge (which crosses from the prefectural road), and another approximately 50 meters further up the slope. From these lots, visitors ascend the stone steps of the approach path. After passing through the Sanmon (Mountain Gate) midway up the ascent, one encounters statues of Fudo Myoo and the Omukae Daishi (Welcoming Great Master). Those unable to climb any further may offer their prayers here and entrust the delivery of their Nokyo (sutra offering slips) to a companion. Continuing further up, past the red Gokuraku-bashi (Bridge of Paradise), the path becomes lined with countless stone Buddha statues; ascend a little further still, and the main temple precincts finally come into view overhead. Upon reaching the terrace of the Honbo (Main Priory), one finds the *Mizuko Jizo* (Guardian Deity of Departed Children), the Bell Tower, and a bio-toilet (installed in December 2001) on the left; on the right are the Temizuya (purification pavilion), the Kuri (temple kitchen/administrative office), and the Nokyo-jo (sutra offering office). A short climb further up leads to the Hondo (Main Hall), with the Daishido situated to its left. Passing the Daishido and proceeding through the Nio-mon (Guardian Gate) into the mountain forest, the path eventually leads to the Oku-no-in (Inner Sanctuary), which houses the Sanjuroku Doji Gyoba (Training Ground of the Thirty-Six Attendants), the Seriwari Zenjo (Cleft Meditation Site), and the Kusari Zenjo (Chain Meditation Site).

- Henjokaku (Hall for Lay Believers): Completed in 2014 (Heisei 26). The entrance features a statue of Kurikara Fudo, while the top floor houses a seated statue of Fudo Myoo, positioned with its back facing the temple precincts. Visitors can participate in experiential activities such as Ajikan meditation, sutra transcription (Shakyo), and Buddha image tracing (Shabutsu); please contact the temple directly for further details.
- Shukubo* (Temple Lodging): None available.

Parking: Capacity for 105 vehicles. Private parking lots charge 300 yen for standard-sized cars, while the lot adjacent to the prefectural road charges 200 yen.

=== Gallery ===
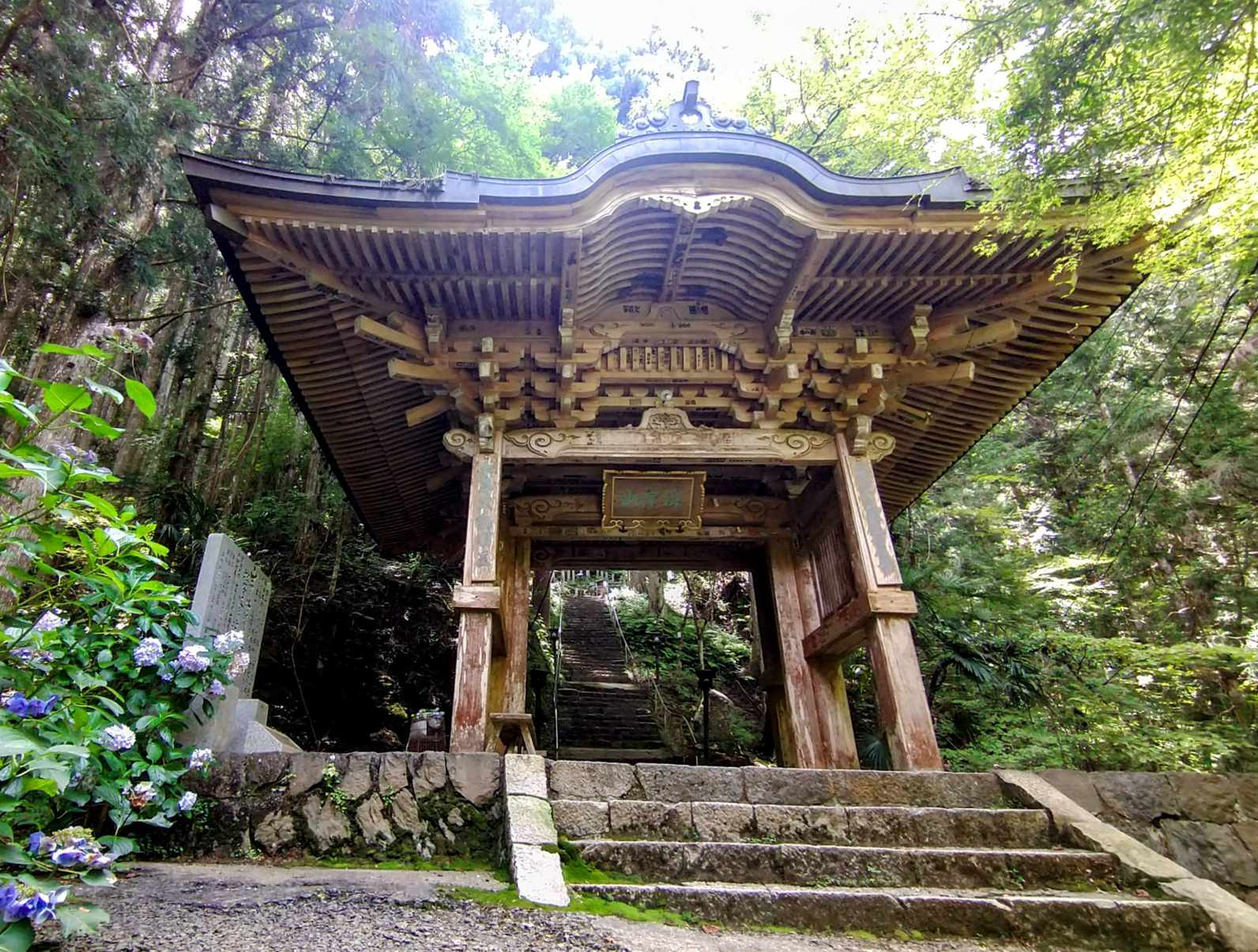
Main Gate

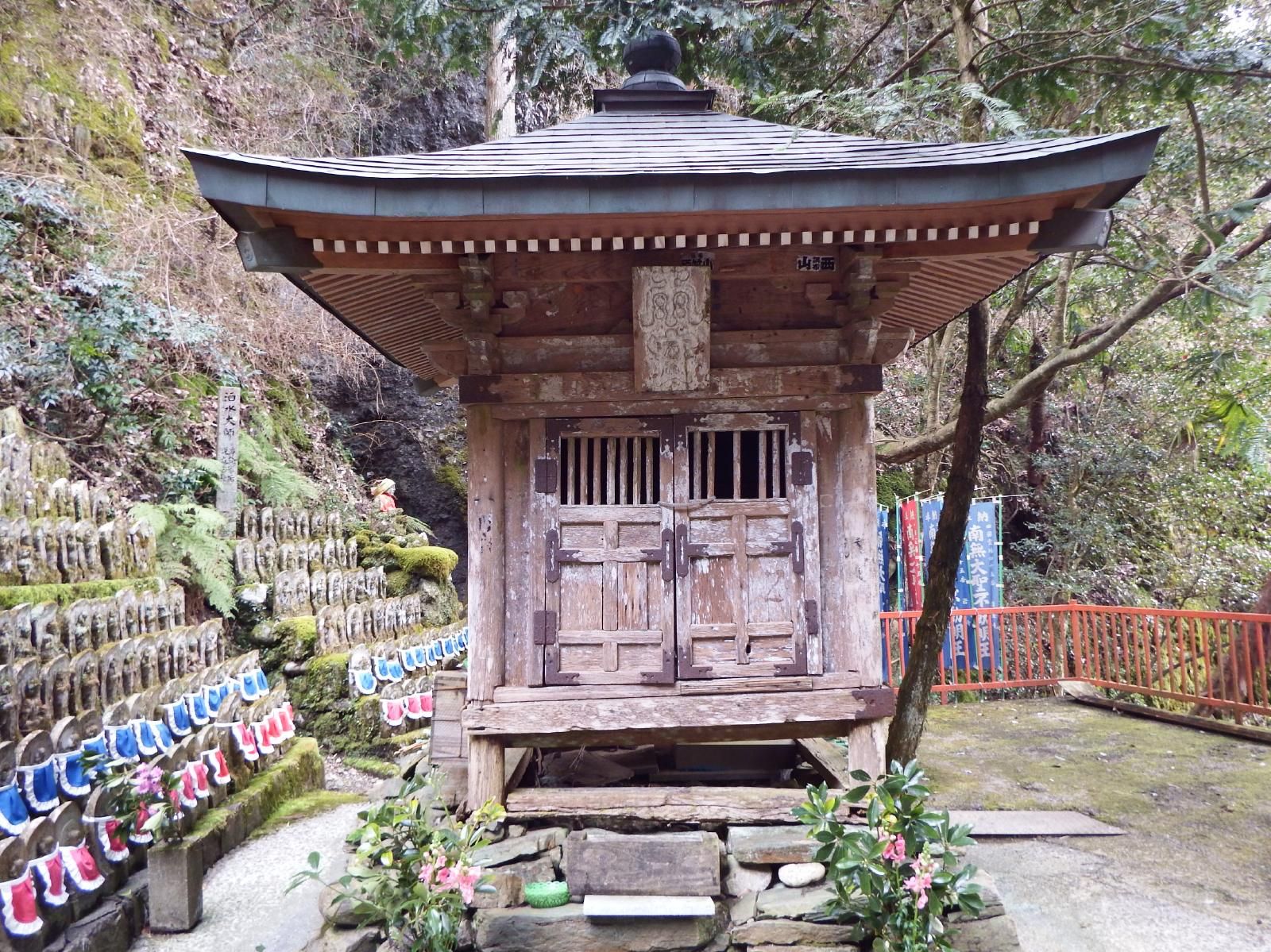
Hall of Kokūzō Bodhisattva

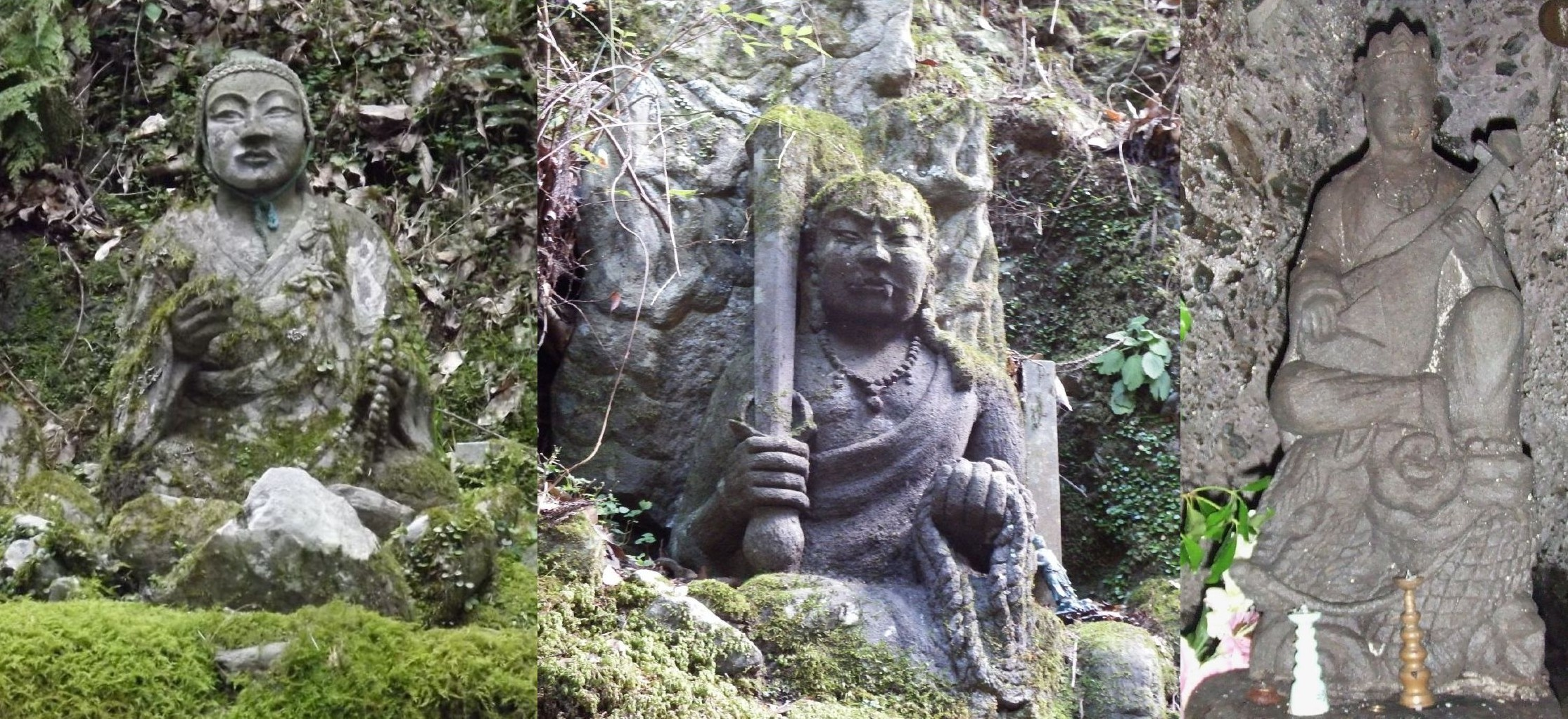
Shusui Daishi, Dōkai Fudō, and Benzaiten of the Grotto

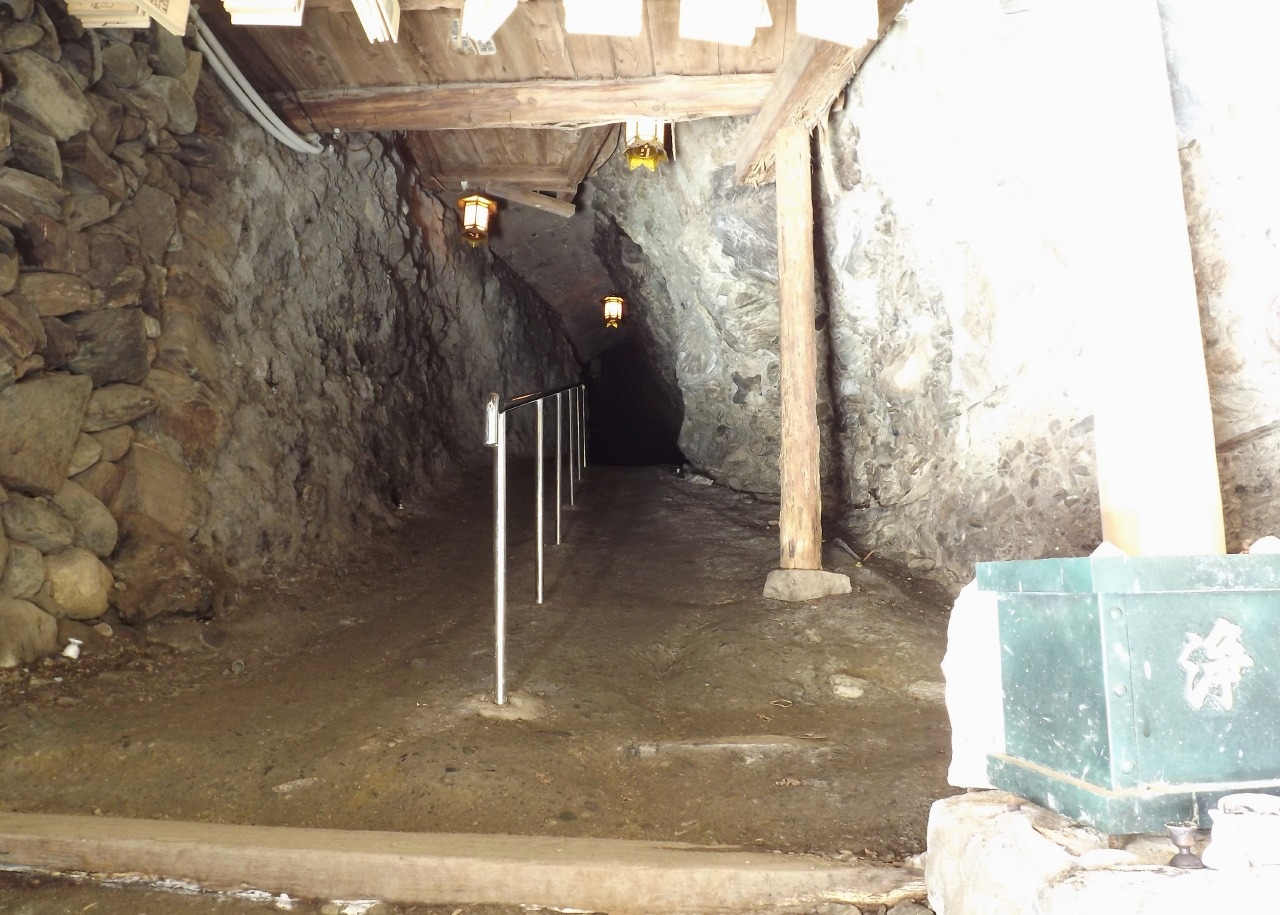
Anazenjō (Cave Meditation Site)

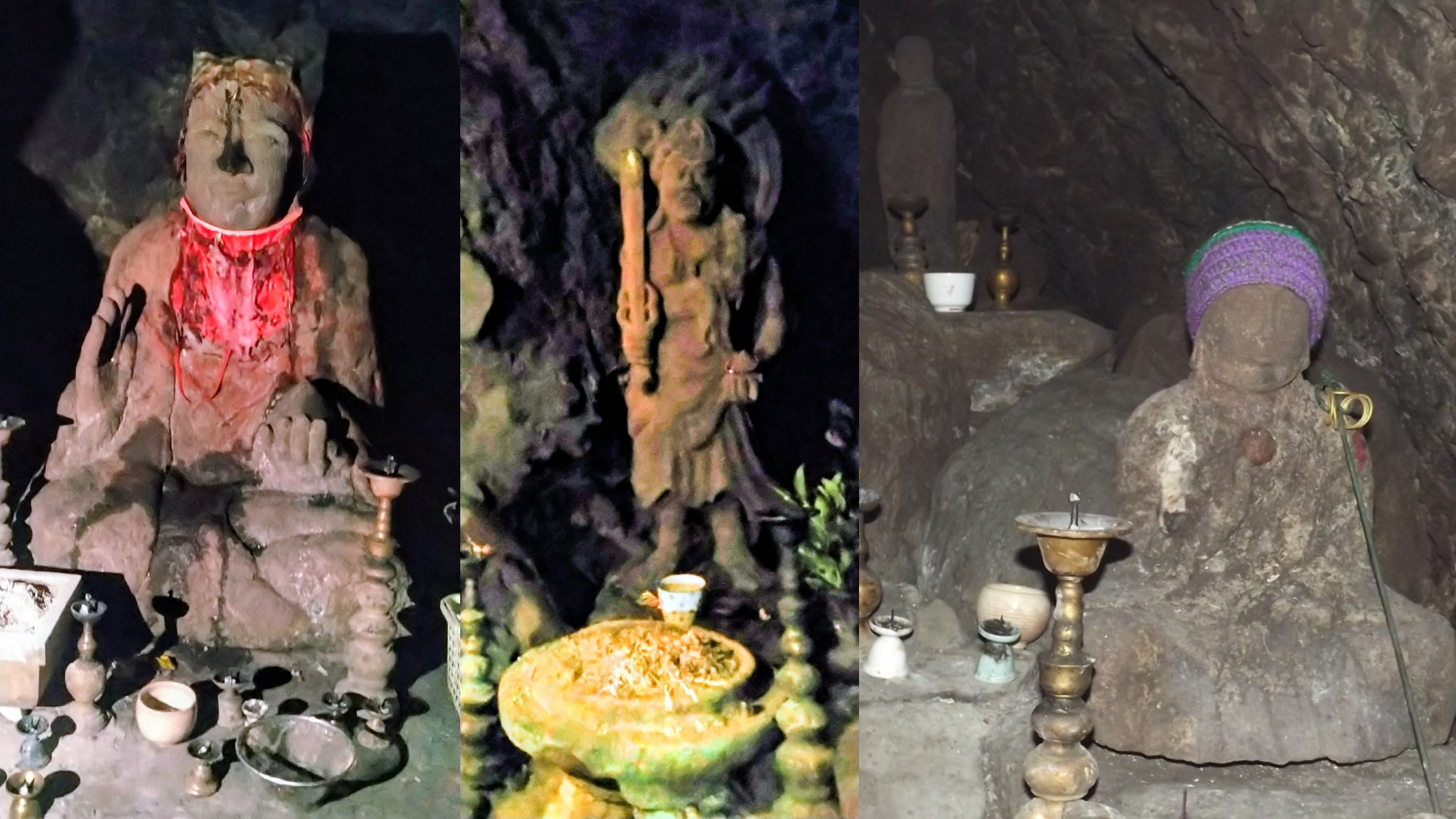
The Three Buddhas of Anazenjō

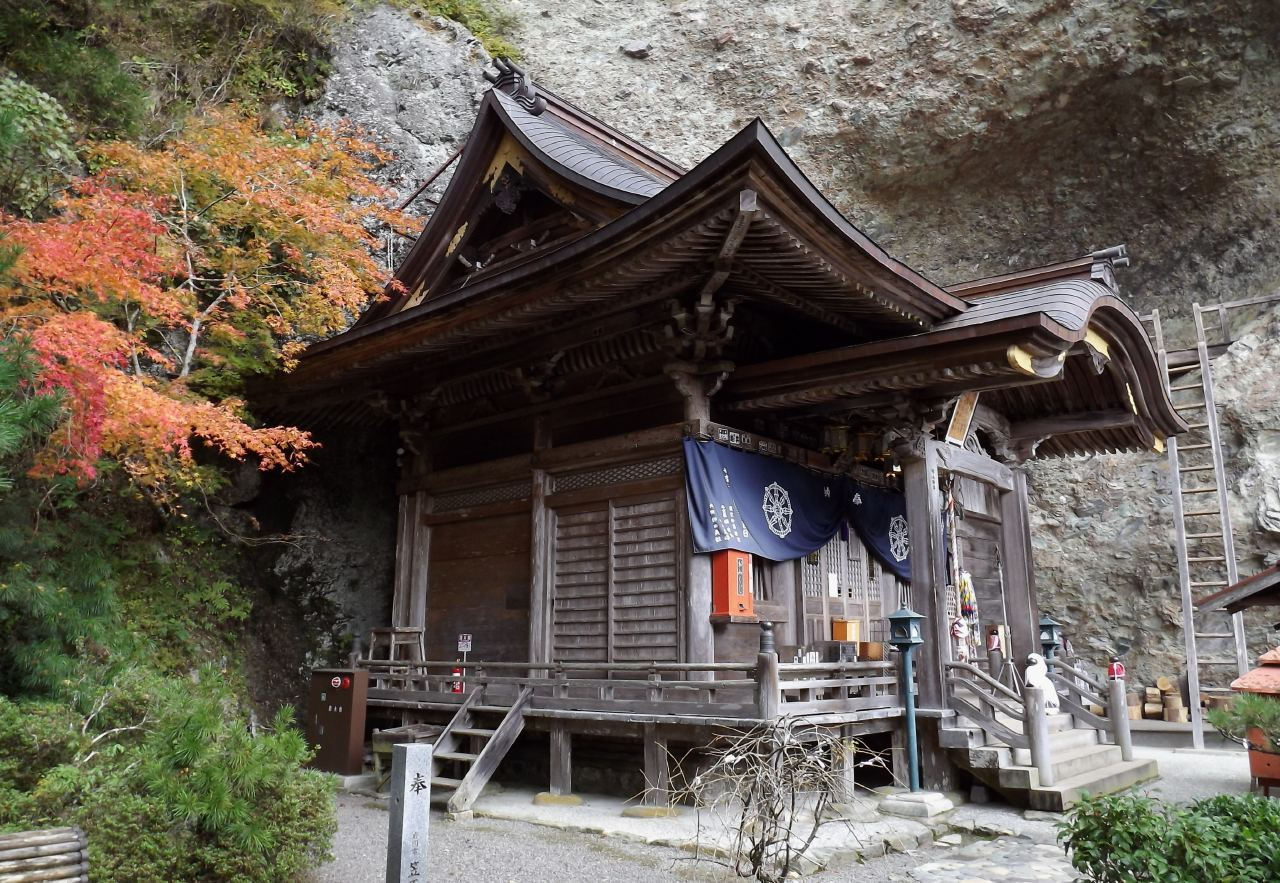
Main Hall

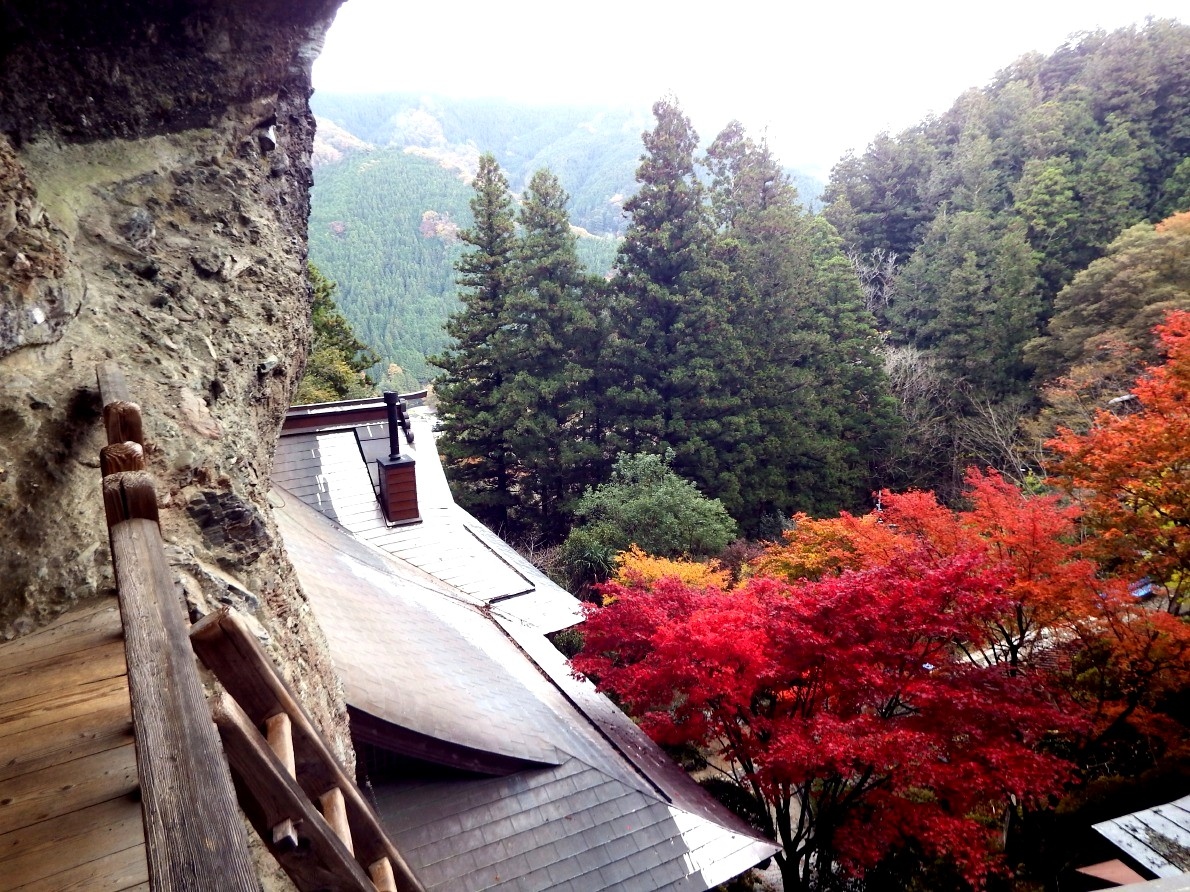
Site of the Hokke Sennin Grotto

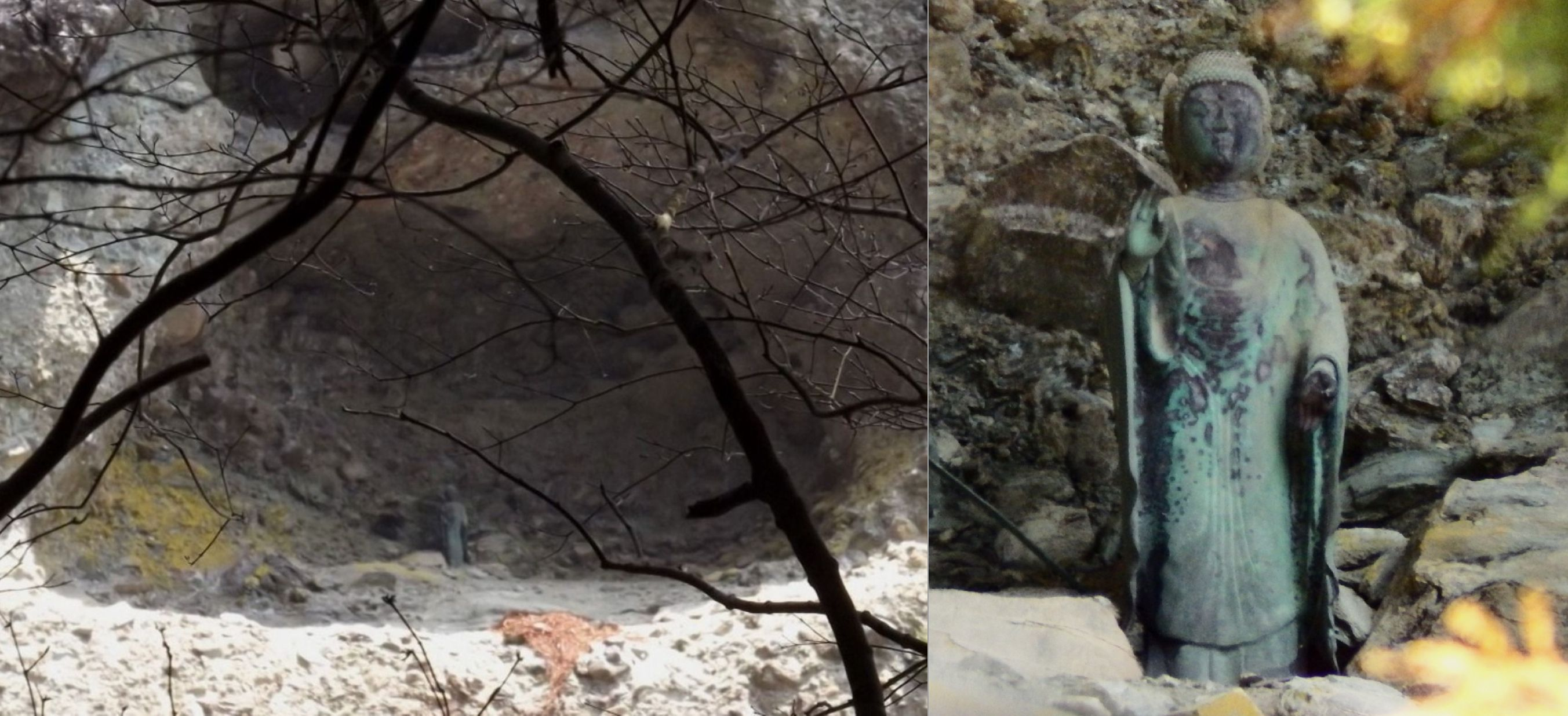
The "Flying Buddha" standing in the Amida Grotto (the recess at the top left)

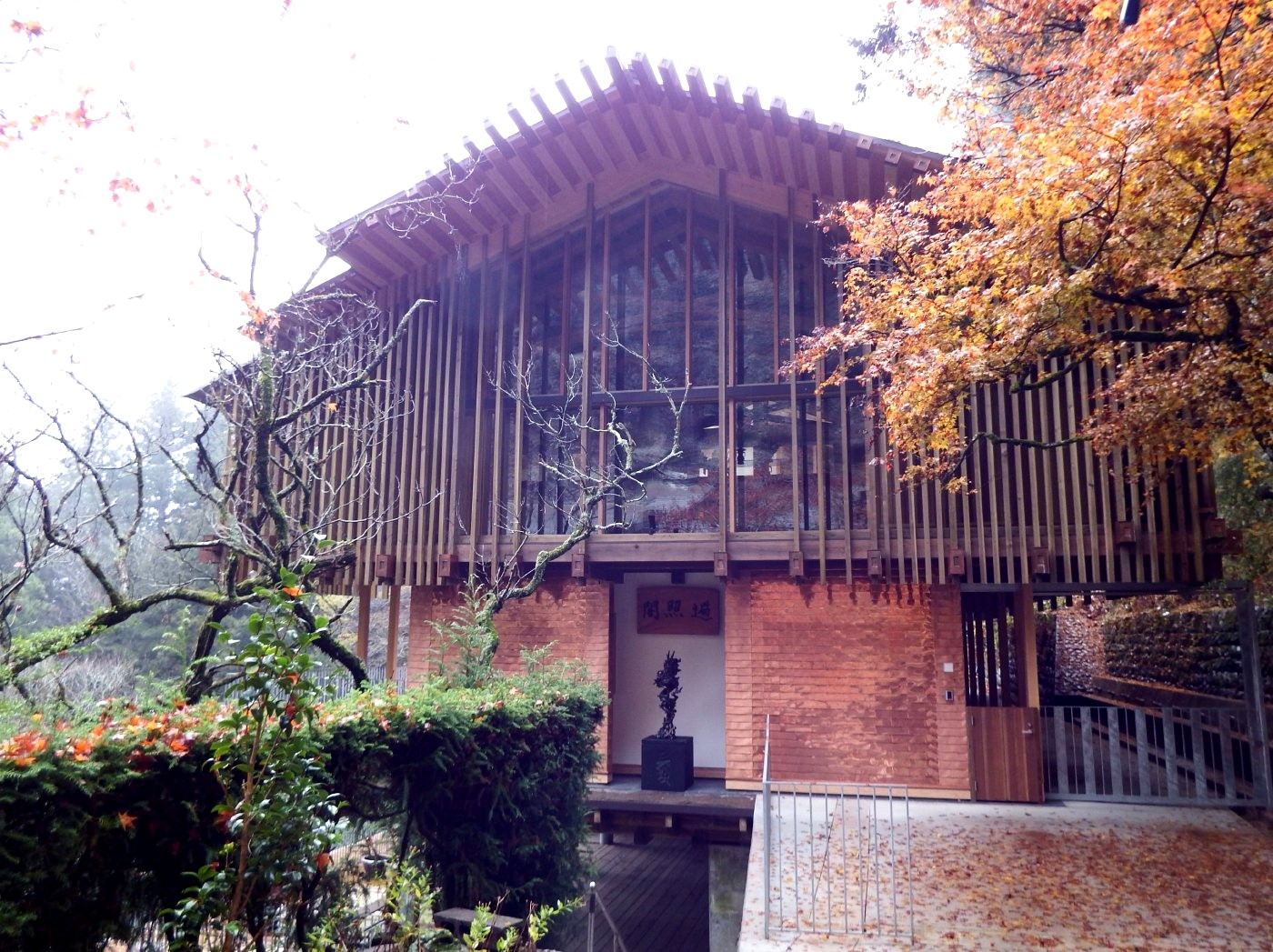
Henjōkaku Pavilion

== Cultural property ==
=== Important Cultural Property ===
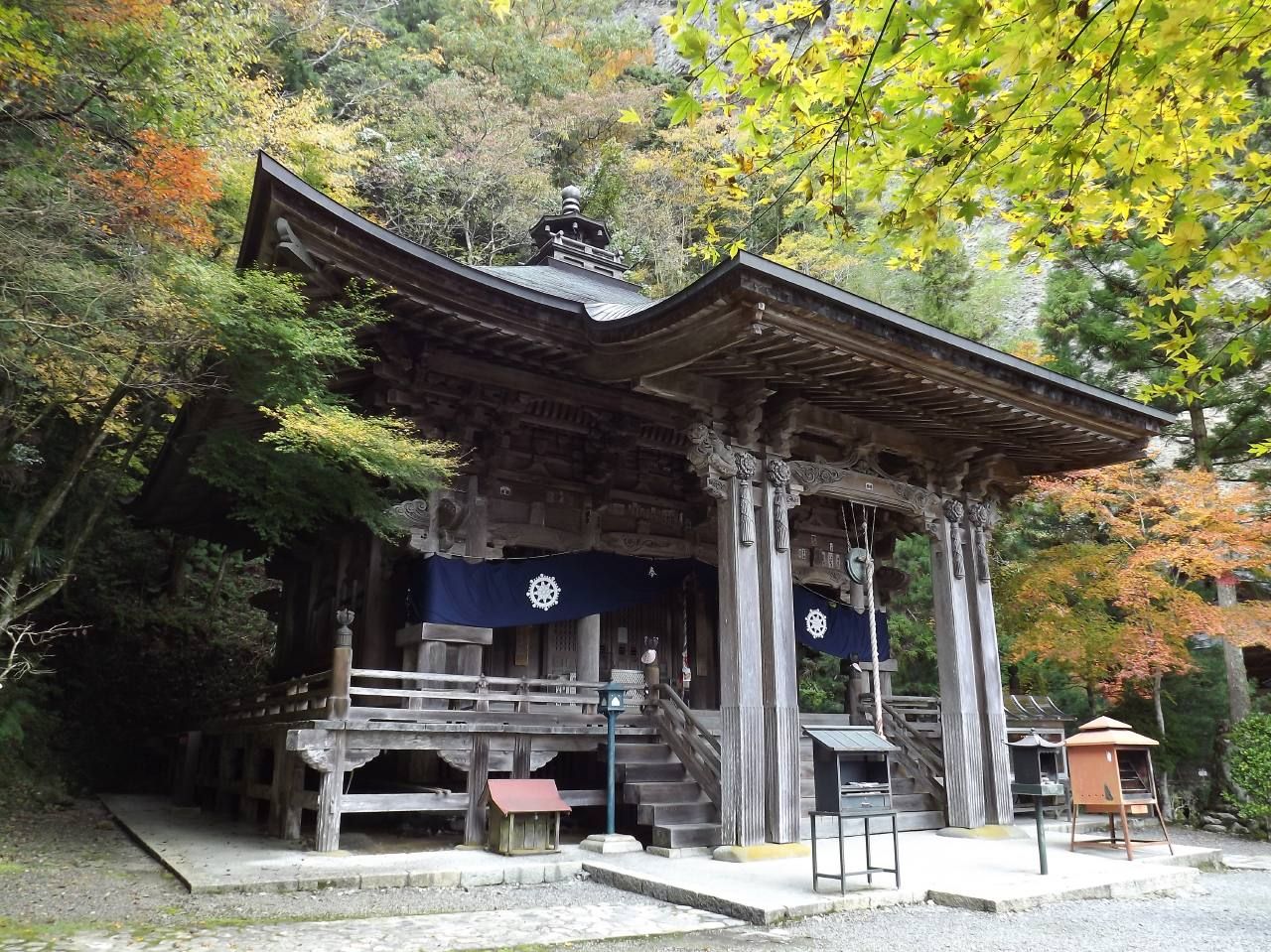
Daishidō (Important Cultural Property)

==== Daishidō: Designated June 18, 2007 ====
Constructed in 1920 (the ninth year of the Taisho era), the structure was designed by Shoichi Kawaguchi—a native of Ehime Prefecture who served as a technical assistant in the Ministry of Finance's Bureau of Building and Repairs—while the carpentry work was executed by Bunjiro Kubota and his team. It features a pyramidal roof (Hogyo-zukuri) clad in copper sheeting. The columns supporting the front portico (kohai) are arranged in pairs on both the left and right sides, while the four corners of the main hall (moya) are supported by clusters of three columns each—an architectural feature rarely encountered in traditional Buddhist temple construction. Western architectural details are incorporated throughout the design; for instance, the portico columns feature entasis (tapering toward the top), with carvings of roses and decorative tassels adorning their upper sections, while their lower sections are embellished with fluting. This structure stands as a quintessential example of a "modern Buddhist hall," representing a synthesis of traditional Buddhist temple architecture with innovative new stylistic elements.

=== National Historic Site ===
- Iyo Pilgrimage Route: Iwaya-ji Path — For the designated section of the pilgrimage route leading from Taihō-ji to this temple, please refer to the entry for Taihō-ji. Designated on March 26, 2021 (and other dates).
- Iyo Pilgrimage Route: Iwaya-ji Temple Precinct — Designated November 10, 2022.
- Iyo Pilgrimage Route—Joruriji Path: Comprising two distinct sections totaling approximately 1.3 km, this designation covers portions of the roughly 29-km pilgrimage route leading from this temple to Joruriji Temple where the landscape of the historic path has been preserved. Designated on November 10, 2022.
1. Approximately 373 meters from the Kokuzo-do Hall at Iwaya-ji Temple to the Main Gate.
2. Senbon Pass (881 m)

=== National Scenic Spot ===
- Iwaya: Designated November 7, 1944.

=== Kuma Kogen Town Designated Tangible Cultural Property ===
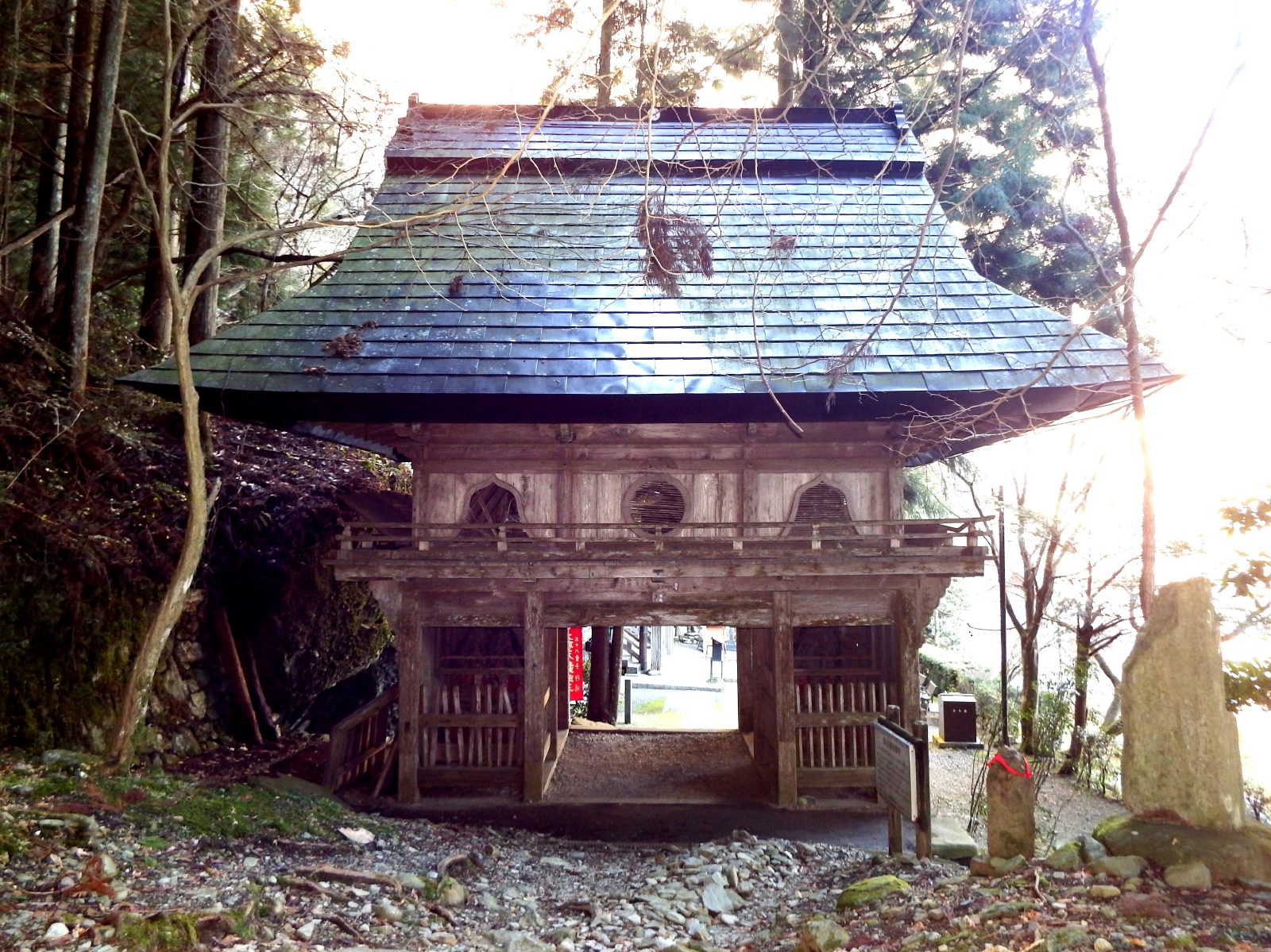
Nio Gate

- Nio Gate: Designated October 1, 1962.

== Access information ==
=== Railway ===
- Shikoku Railway Company (JR Shikoku) – Yosan Line – Matsuyama Station

=== Bus ===
- JR Shikoku Bus – Kuma-Kogen Line: Alight at "Kuma Junior High School" (from "Matsuyama Station")
- Iyotetsu Nanyo Bus – [Kuma Depot Line]: Alight at "Iwaya-ji" (0.6 km)

=== Road ===
- Prefectural Route 12 – Iwaya-ji (0.6 km)

== Okunoin (inner sanctuary) ==
=== (Reference) The Thirty-Six Doji Pilgrimage Route ===
If you request access to the Thirty-Six Doji Pilgrimage Route at the Sutra Reception Office, you can receive a set of 56 votive slips for 300 yen. This set consists of slips for the Thirty-Six Doji (Attendant Deities) plus 20 supplementary slips. The route begins at Marker No. 1, located beside the Nio Gate just past the Daishi Hall; as you ascend the path, depositing the slips in numerical order along the way, you will eventually reach the gate of the *Hikiwari Zenjo* (Cleft Meditation Site) at the very end. Since Marker No. 32 is situated atop a steep peak, a designated votive slip box has been placed at the base of the slope below it. As the journey involves searching for each marker along the way, the entire circuit takes approximately one hour to complete.

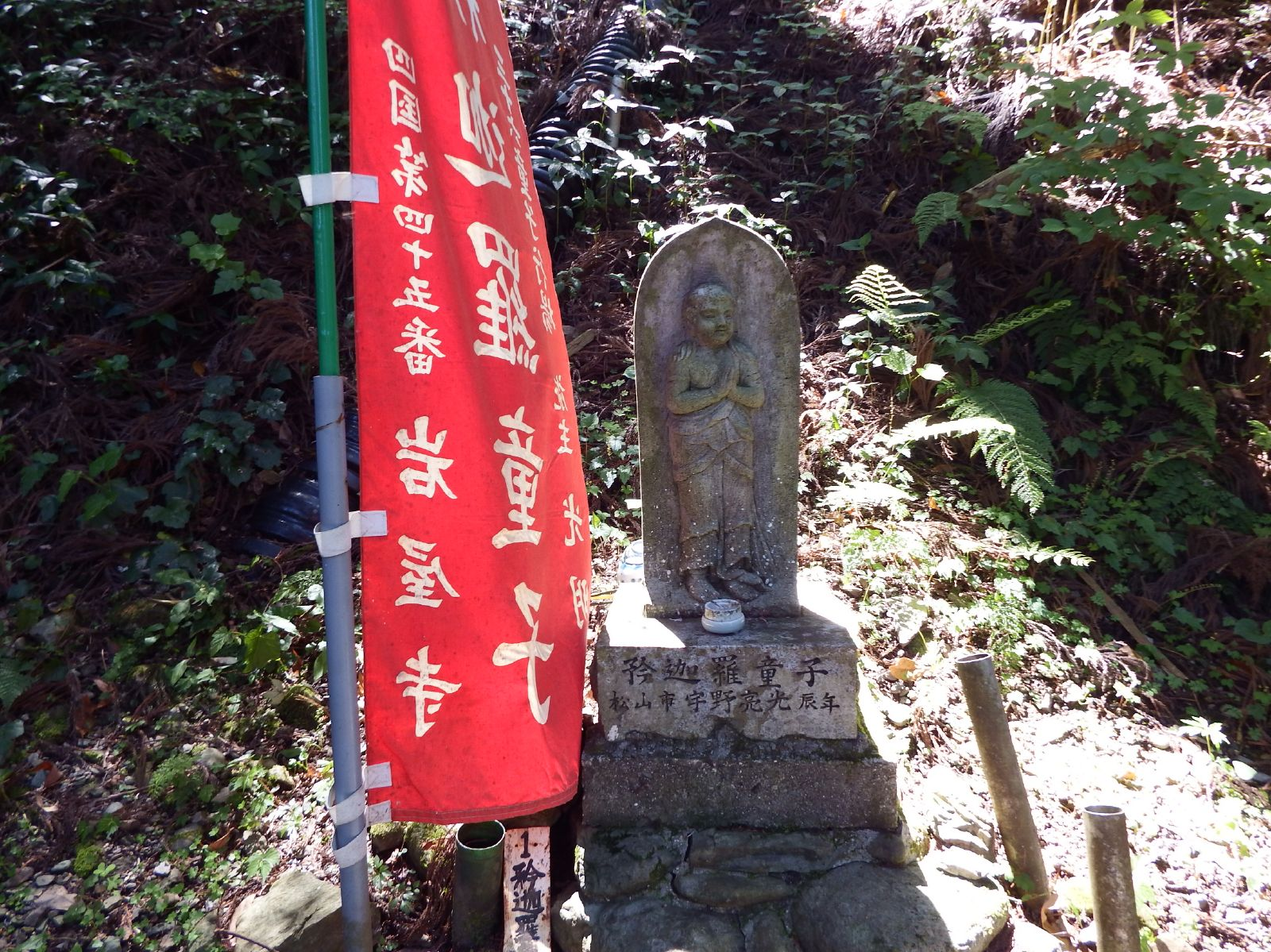
No. 1

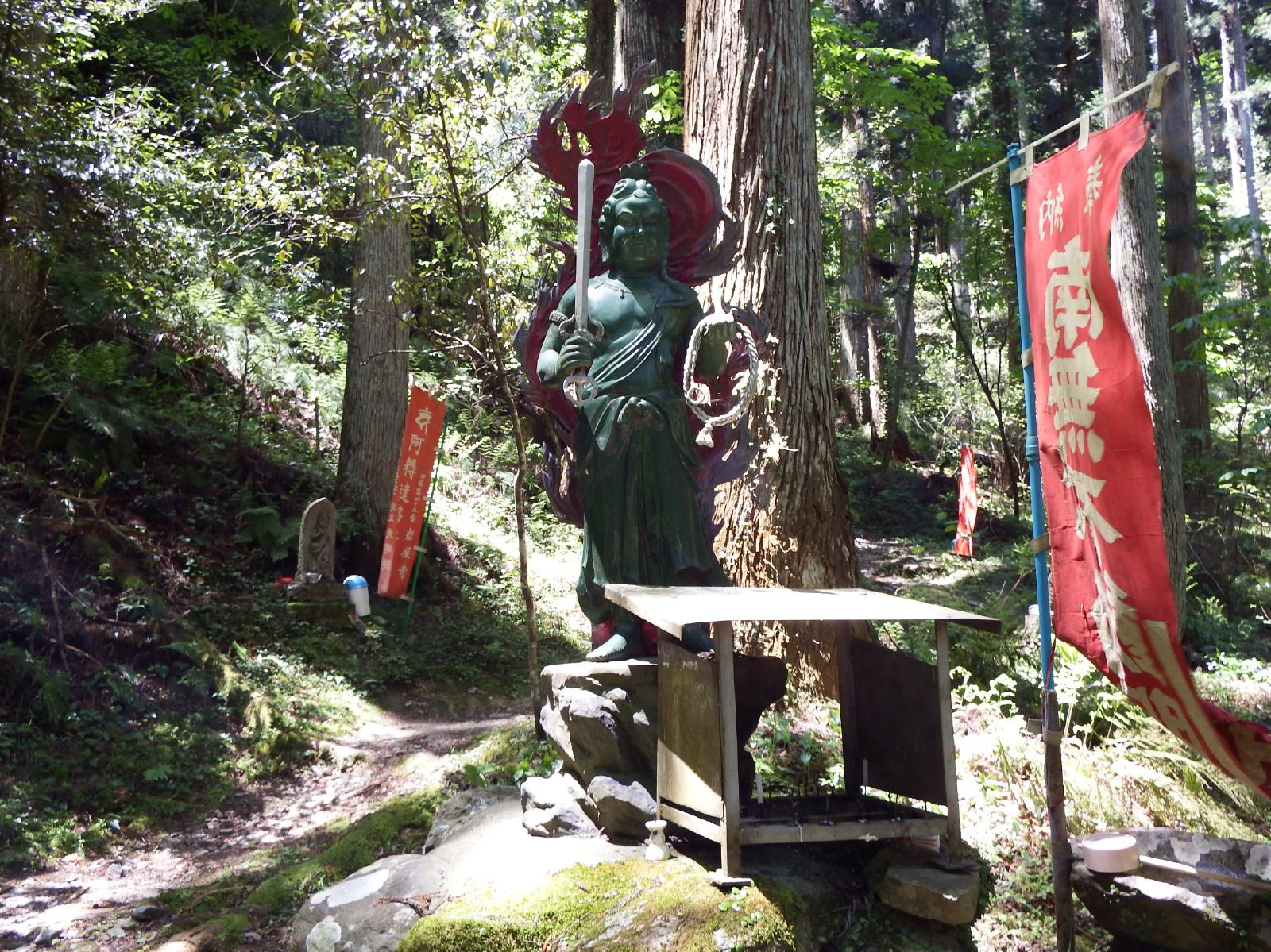
Fudō Myōō Statue (Midway)

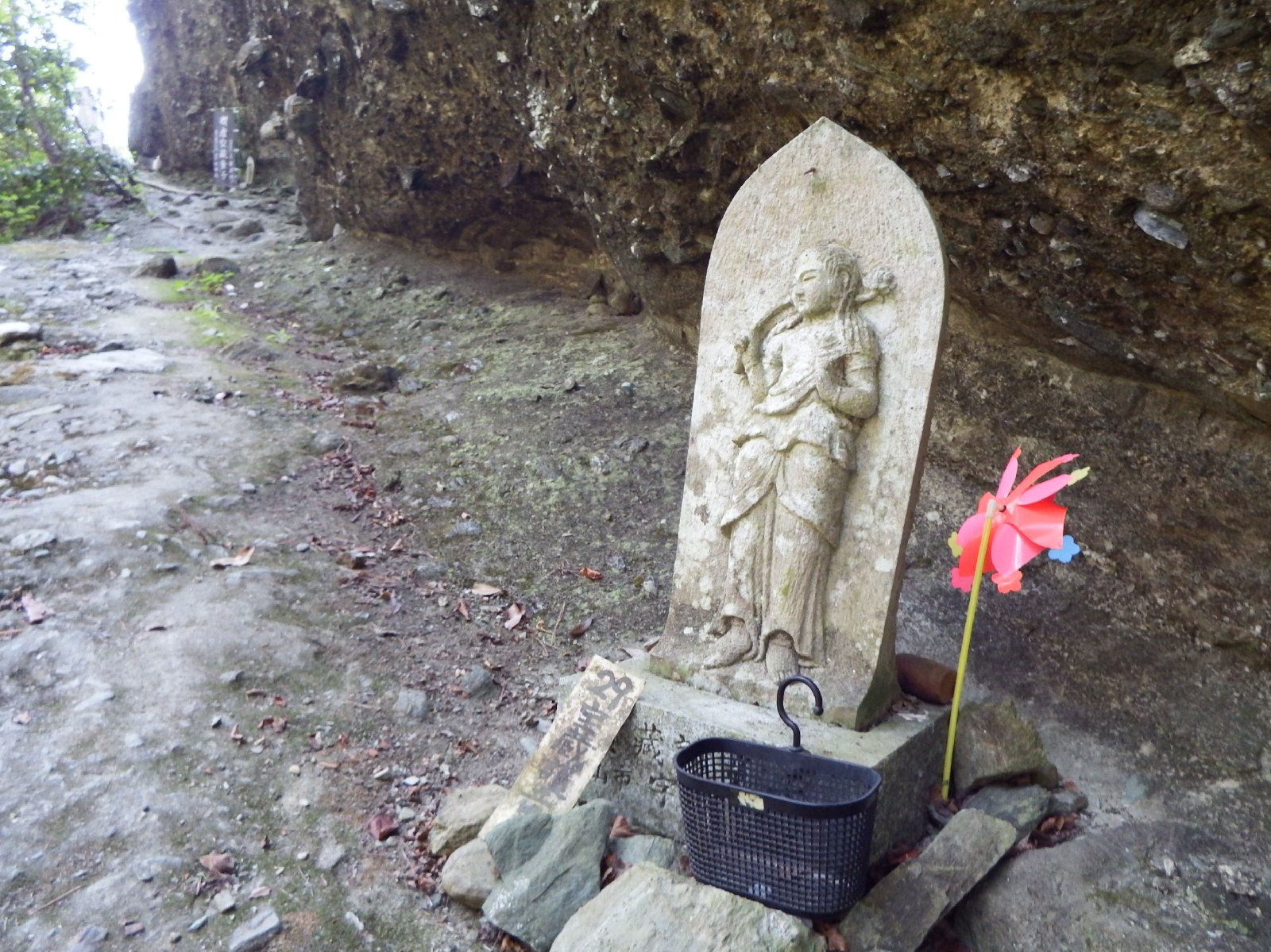
No. 29

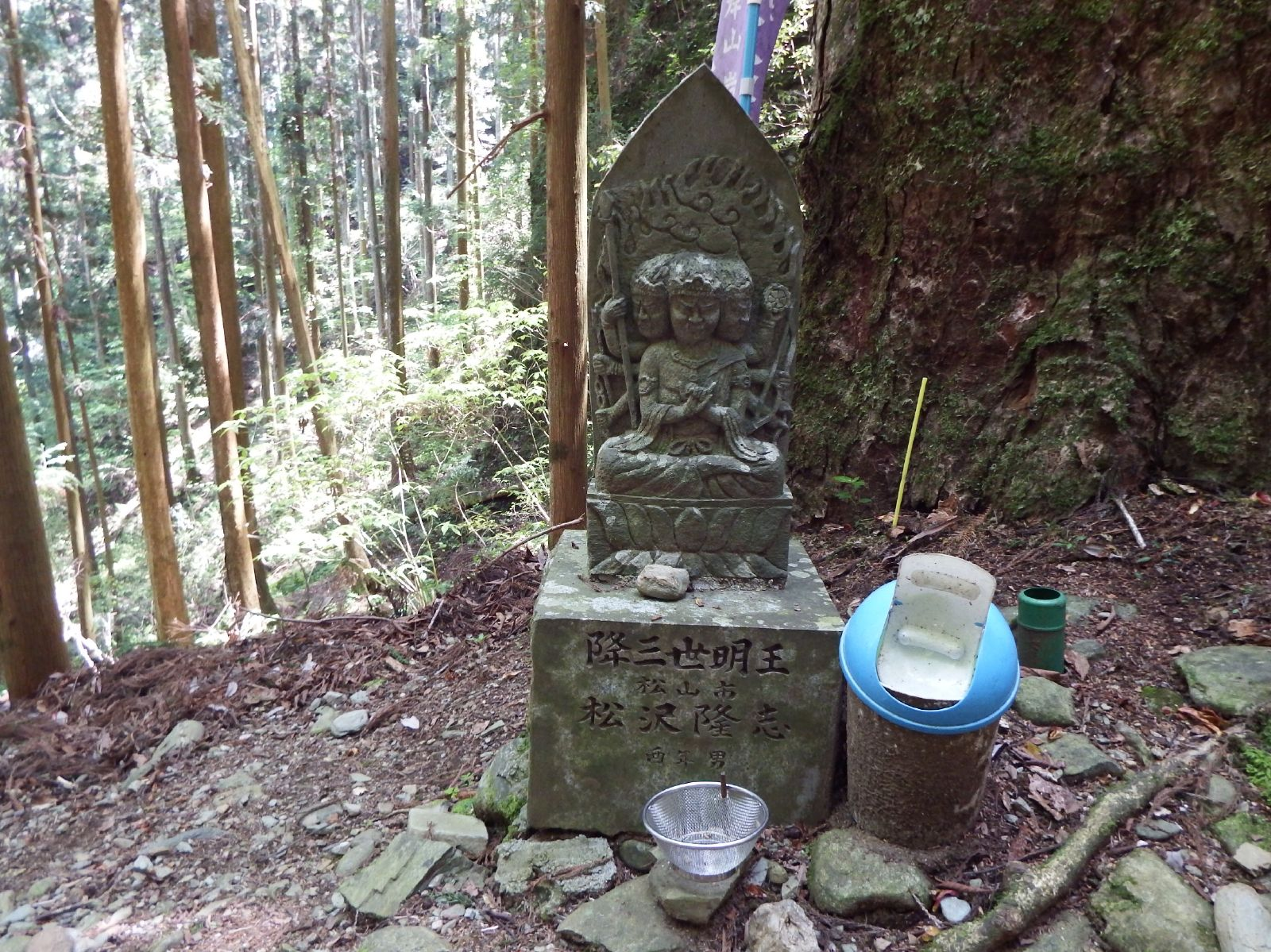
Final Stop

=== Hakusan training grounds ===
Proceeding from the Main Temple, passing through the Nio Gate, and clearing the Thirty-Six Attendants' Training Course, one arrives at a gate flanked by a large, standing statue of Fudo Myoo rendered in red. Using the key obtained at the Sutra Reception Office to unlock and enter the gate, one ascends through a narrow rock cleft known as the Hemiwari Zenjo—where the rock walls press in tightly from both sides—and continues up a section requiring the aid of chains to reach the foot of a sturdy wooden ladder. Situated in the saddle just beyond lies a single, ancient shrine. Ascending the cliff face further ahead reveals two additional shrines. Returning to the ladder and climbing to the summit, one finds a stone-chambered shrine where Hakusan Gongen is enshrined.

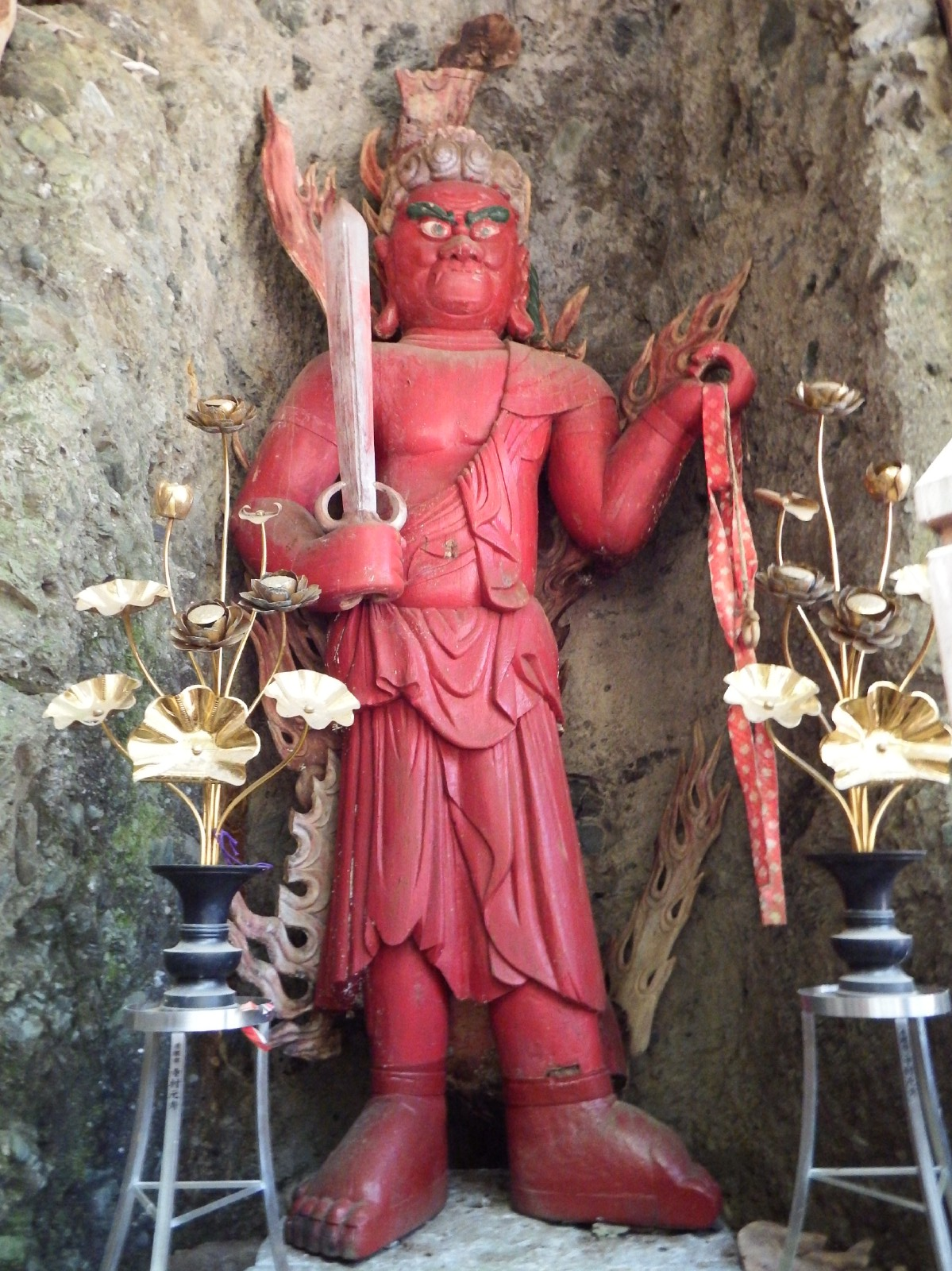
The Great Red Fudo

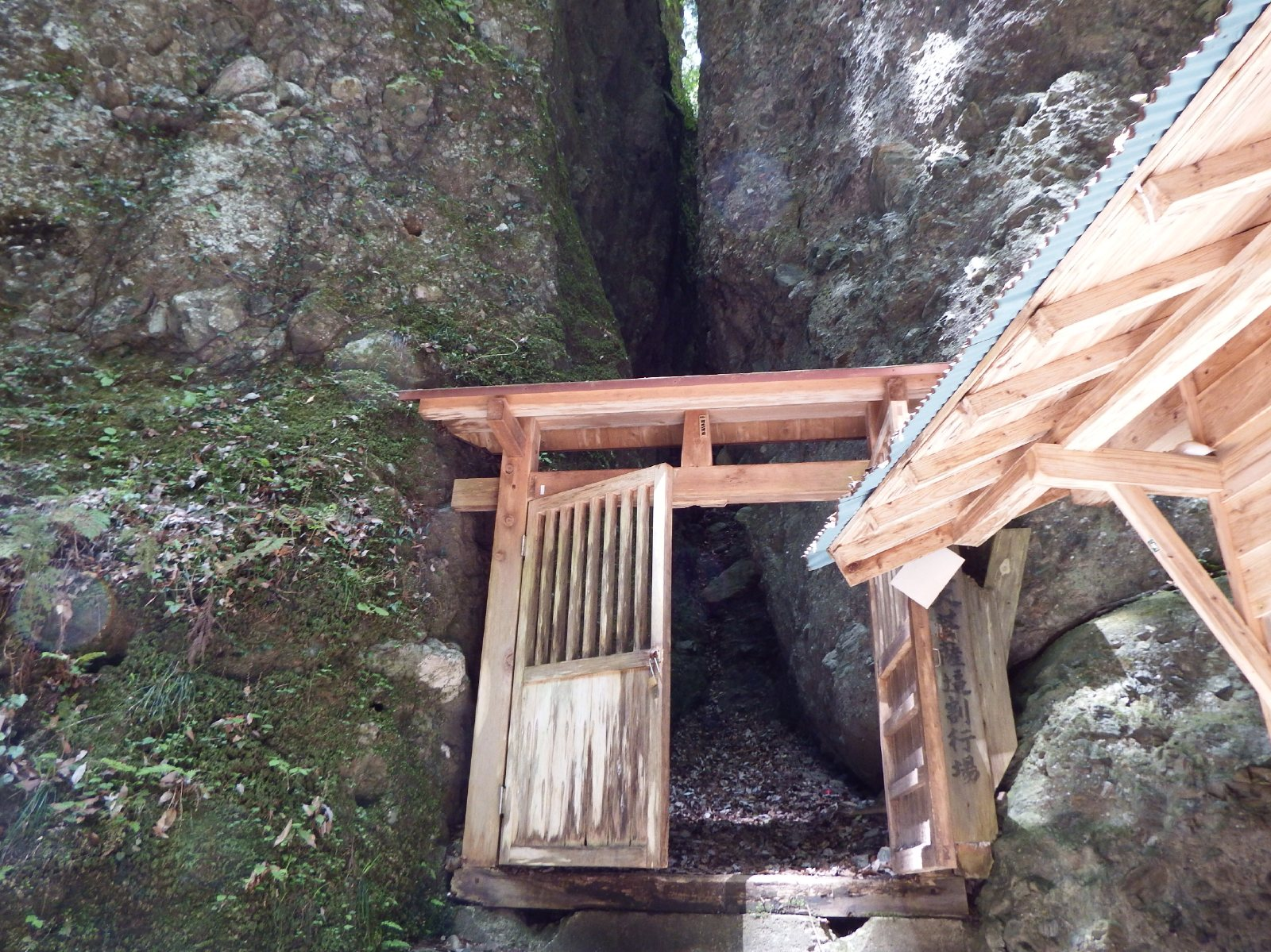
The Gate of the Bikiwari Meditation

The Summit Shrine to Hakusan Gongen

== Related nearby sites ==
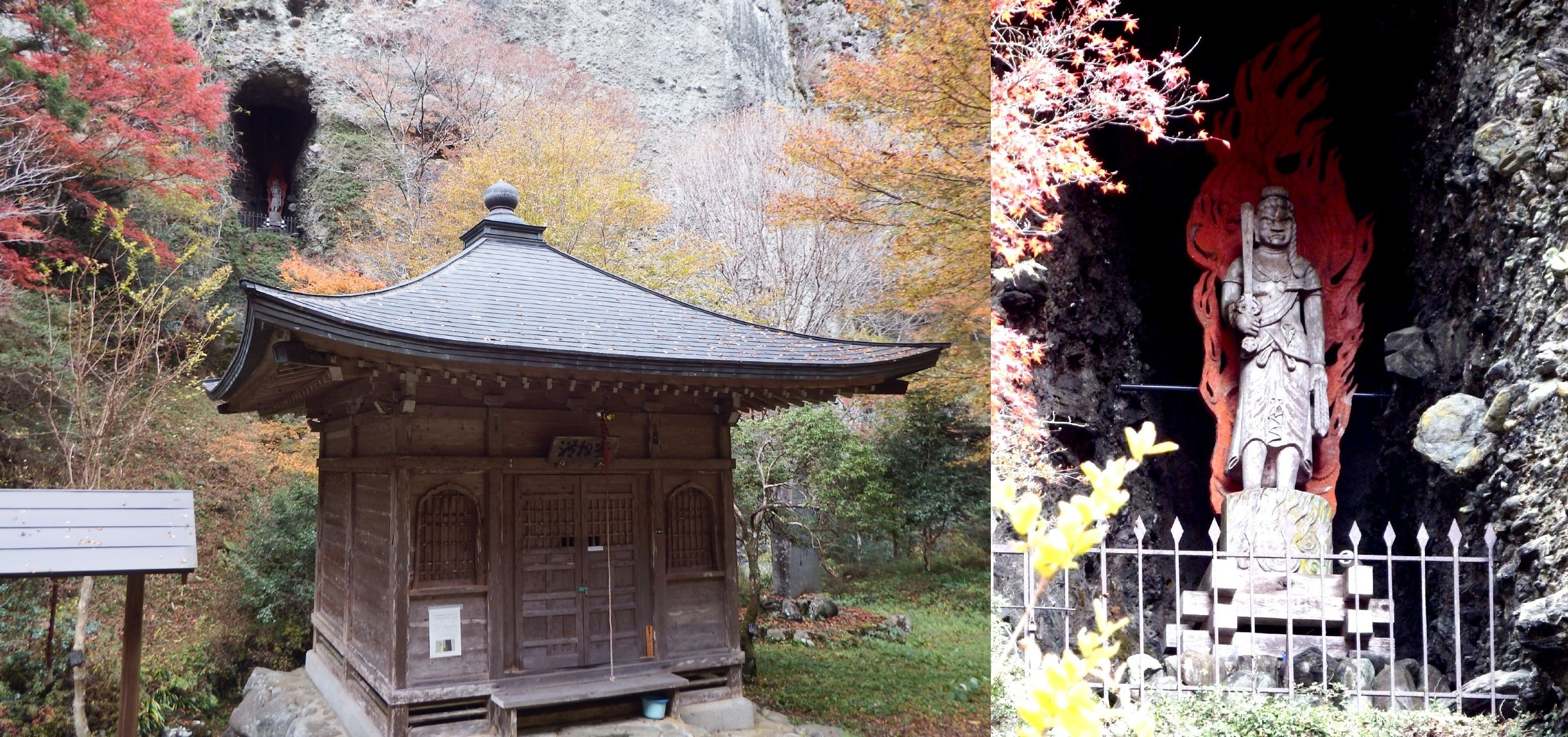
Fudō Hall at Huruiwaya

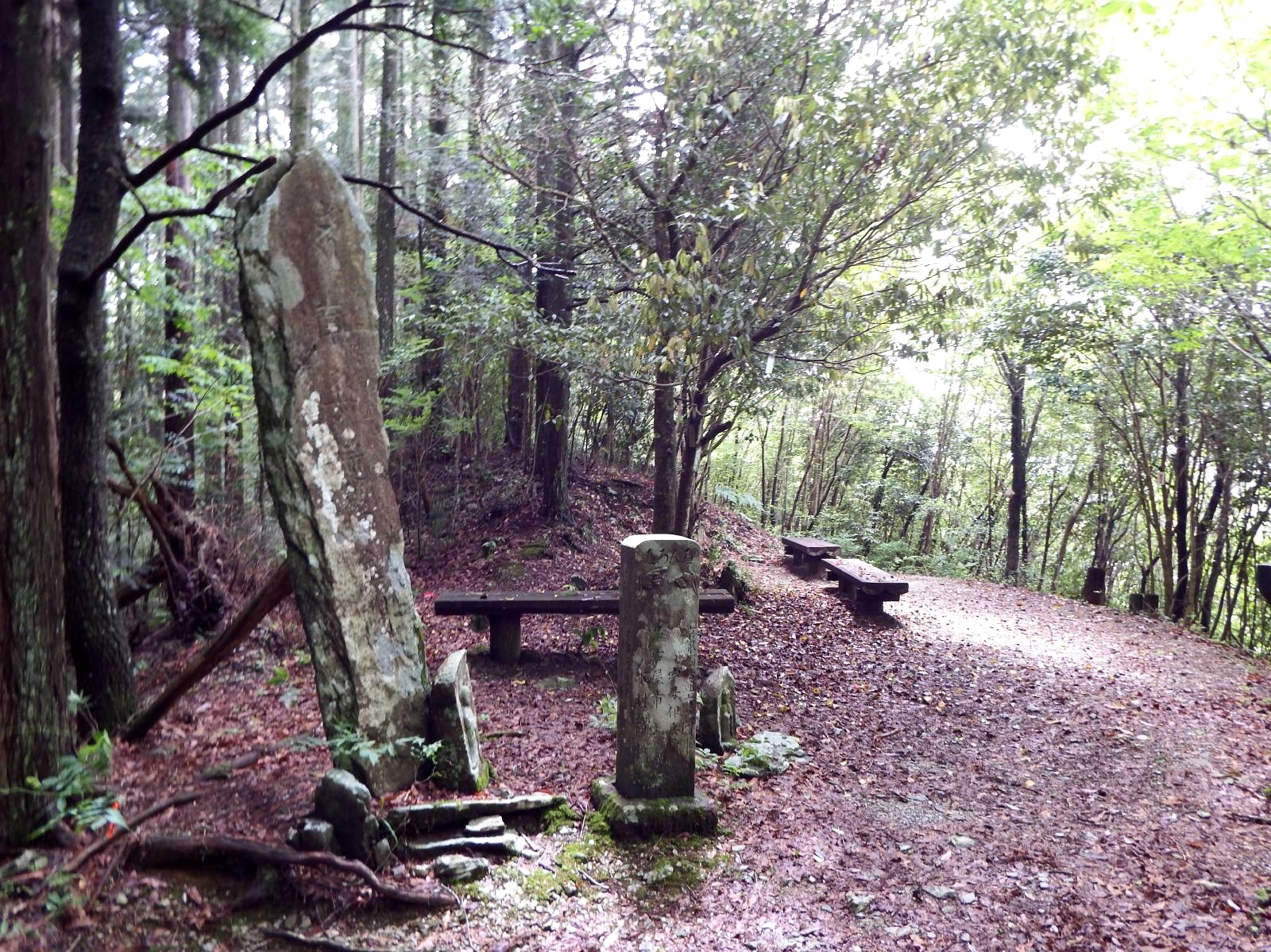
Site of the Teahouse at Hatchōzaka

=== Furu-iwaya ===
- Fudo-son of Koiwaya: The structure serves as a worship hall; housed within a natural pothole carved into the 80-meter-high rock face of Mount Fudo directly behind it is a large standing statue of Fudo Myo-o (3.03 meters tall, carved from a single piece of Kaya wood in 1972). (33°40′1.61″N 132°58′4.21″E)
- Haiku Monument: A stone monument inscribed with a haiku by Masaoka Shiki—"Natsu no hi mo / hiete shitataru / iwama kana" (Even on a summer day / cold and dripping / the rocky cleft)—stands in front of the worship hall.
- Daishi-do of Koiwaya: This hall is built as if clinging to the very base of Mount Daishi, a 65-meter-high rock formation. It has fallen into disrepair, and the Buddhist statues originally housed within have been lost; however, a small subsidiary shrine and several stone statues are lined up to the left of the main structure. (33°40′4.71″N 132°58′13.48″E)
- Hatcho-zaka Slope: The starting point for the ascent. (33°39′59.03″N 132°57′42.46″E)
- Site of the Hatcho-zaka Teahouse: This marks the junction where the Hatcho-zaka course—a switchback trail ascending from the north (rising from an elevation of approx. 575 m to approx. 735 m)—meets the direct, non-looping route ascending from Makinotani in Nakano Village to the southwest. In 1748 (Enkyo 5), residents of Nanatori Village erected a large stone slab inscribed with the mantra "Namu Henjo Kongo" at this site to assert that the path through Makinotani was, in fact, the original and authentic route. (33°39′43.56″N 132°57′41.95″E)
- The Fue-tate Jizō (Staff-Resting Jizō) of Koiwaya: Inside the small shrine stands a stone pillar at the center, flanked by several walking staffs. (33°40′5.08″N 132°58′23.77″E)

== Preceding and following temples ==
Shikoku 88-Temple Pilgrimage 44 Daihō-ji --(9.7 km)-- 45 Iwaya-ji --(29.5 km)-- 46 Jōruri-ji

- Note: There are multiple routes for the pilgrimage path; the distances listed above are based on the standard route.

== See also ==
- Shikoku Pilgrimage

== Bibliography ==
- 先達教典. Shikoku 88 Sacred Places Association. 2006.
- 宮崎建樹 (2007). The Shikoku Pilgrimage: Walking Alone, Yet Accompanied by Two. Vol. 地図編 (第8版 ed.). へんろみち保存協力会.
- 文化庁 監修 (2007). 新指定の文化財. 月刊文化財. Vol. 526. JPNO 00007014.
