= 52266 Van Flandern =

Main-belt asteroid

Discovery
- Discovered by: C. S. Shoemaker; E. M. Shoemaker
- Discovery site: Palomar Obs.
- Discovery date: 10 January 1986

Designations
- Named after: Tom Van Flandern (American astronomer)
- Alternative designations: 1986 AD · 1975 CJ; 1998 QX_{81} · 2002 QQ
- Minor planet category: main-belt · Phocaea

Orbital characteristics
- Epoch 4 September 2017 (JD 2458000.5)
- Uncertainty parameter 0
- Observation arc: 41.88 yr (15,298 days)
- Aphelion: 2.8486 AU
- Perihelion: 1.8213 AU
- Semi-major axis: 2.3349 AU
- Eccentricity: 0.2200
- Orbital period (sidereal): 3.57 yr (1,303 days)
- Mean anomaly: 275.98°
- Mean motion: 0° 16^{m} 34.32^{s} / day
- Inclination: 23.707°
- Longitude of ascending node: 302.17°
- Argument of perihelion: 229.79°

Physical characteristics
- Dimensions: 3.47±0.47 km 4.42±0.83 km 4.60 km (calculated)
- Synodic rotation period: 9.65±0.06 h 9.8816±0.0076 h 9.89±0.01 h 9.890±0.003 h
- Geometric albedo: 0.23 (assumed); 0.249±0.163; 0.30±0.09
- Spectral type: S
- Absolute magnitude (H): 13.9 · 13.908±0.002 (R) · 14.10±0.23 · 14.31

52266 Van Flandern (provisional designation 1986 AD) is a stony Phocaea asteroid from the inner regions of the asteroid belt, approximately 4 kilometers in diameter. It was discovered on 10 January 1986, by American astronomers Carolyn and Eugene Shoemaker at the Palomar Observatory in California, United States. The asteroid was later named for American astronomer Tom Van Flandern.

== Orbit and classification ==
Van Flandern is a member of the Phocaea family (701), a family of stony asteroids with similar orbital characteristics. It orbits the Sun in the inner main-belt at a distance of 1.8–2.8 AU once every 3 years and 7 months (1,303 days). Its orbit has an eccentricity of 0.22 and an inclination of 24° with respect to the ecliptic. The asteroid's observation arc begins 11 years prior to its official discovery observation, with its identification as 1975 CJ at the Karl Schwarzschild Observatory in February 1975.

== Physical characteristics ==
Van Flandern has been characterized as a common S-type asteroid by Pan-STARRS photometric survey.

=== Lightcurves ===
In January and February 2011, four rotational lightcurves of Van Flandern were obtained from photometric observations at the Via Capote Observatory (G69), the Palomar Transient Factory, and the Australian Oakley Southern Sky Observatory (E09), as well as by astronomer René Roy at his Blauvac Observatory (627) in France. Lightcurve analysis gave a well-defined rotation period between 9.65 and 9.89 hours with a brightness variation between 0.52 and 0.61 magnitude (U=3/2/3/2+).

=== Diameter and albedo ===
According to the survey carried out by NASA's Wide-field Infrared Survey Explorer with its subsequent NEOWISE mission, Van Flandern measures 3.47 and 4.42 kilometers in diameter and its surface has an albedo of 0.30 and 0.249, respectively.

The Collaborative Asteroid Lightcurve Link assumes an albedo of 0.23 – derived from 25 Phocaea, the family's most massive member and namesake – and calculates a diameter of 4.6 kilometers with an absolute magnitude of 13.9.

== Naming ==
This minor planet was named in memory of American astronomer Tom Van Flandern (1940–2009), expert in lunar occultations and on the dynamics of binary minor planets at USNO in the 1970s.

Van Flandern also participated in the refinement of the Global Positioning System and published the Meta Research Bulletin for non-mainstream views on cosmology. The approved naming citation was published by the Minor Planet Center on 9 February 2009 (M.P.C. 65123).
