= Tom Van Flandern =

American astronomer

Thomas Charles Van Flandern
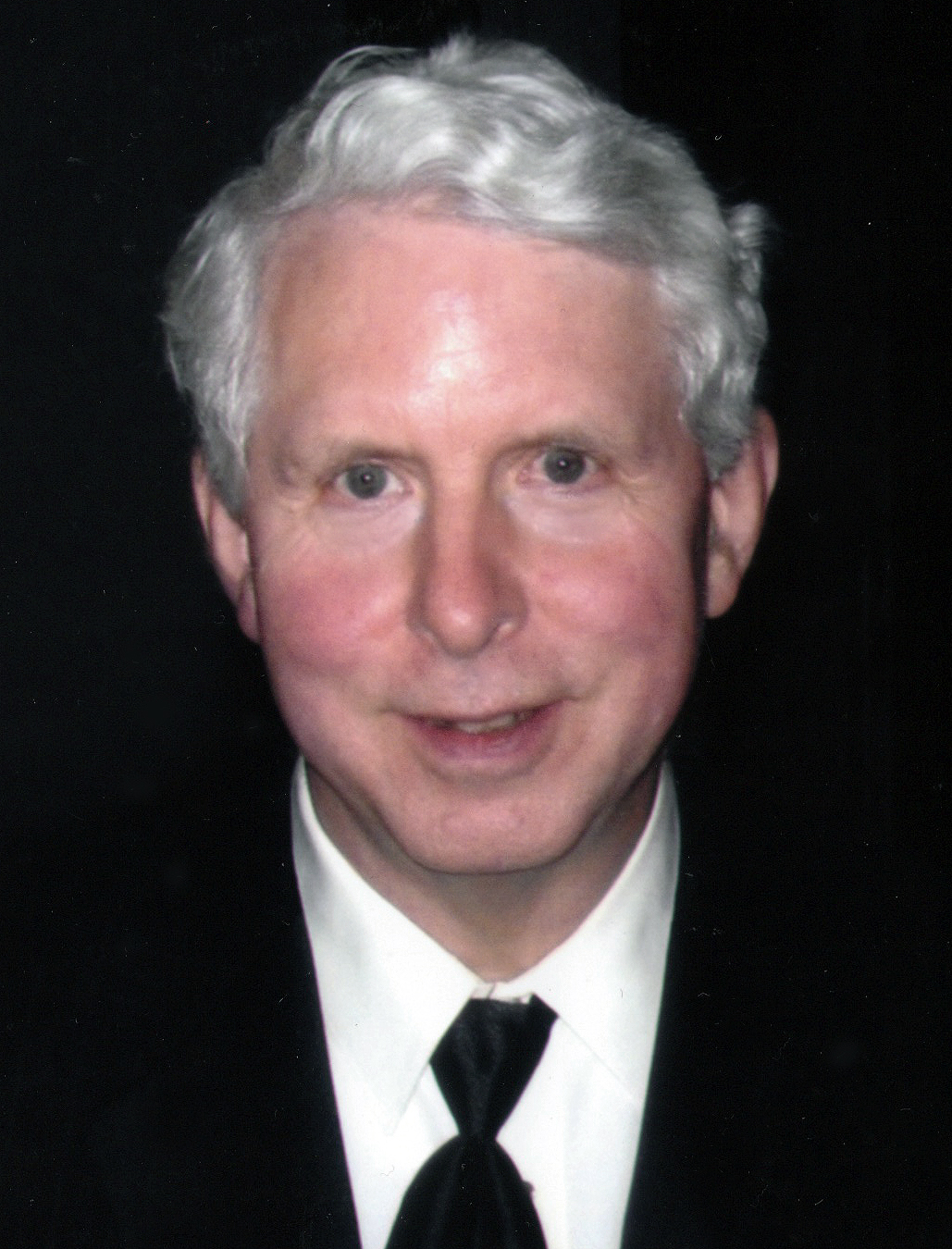
- Thomas Van Flandern in 2007
- Born: June 26, 1940; Cleveland, Ohio
- Died: January 9, 2009 (aged 68); Seattle, Washington
- Education: Yale University, Xavier University
- Scientific career
- Fields: Astronomy and fringe-science
- Workplaces: U.S. Naval Observatory, Meta Research

Thomas Charles Van Flandern (June 26, 1940 – January 9, 2009) was an American astronomer and author who specialized in celestial mechanics. Van Flandern had a career as a professional scientist but was noted as an outspoken proponent of certain fringe views in astronomy, physics, and extraterrestrial life. He also published the non-mainstream Meta Research Bulletin.

== Biography ==
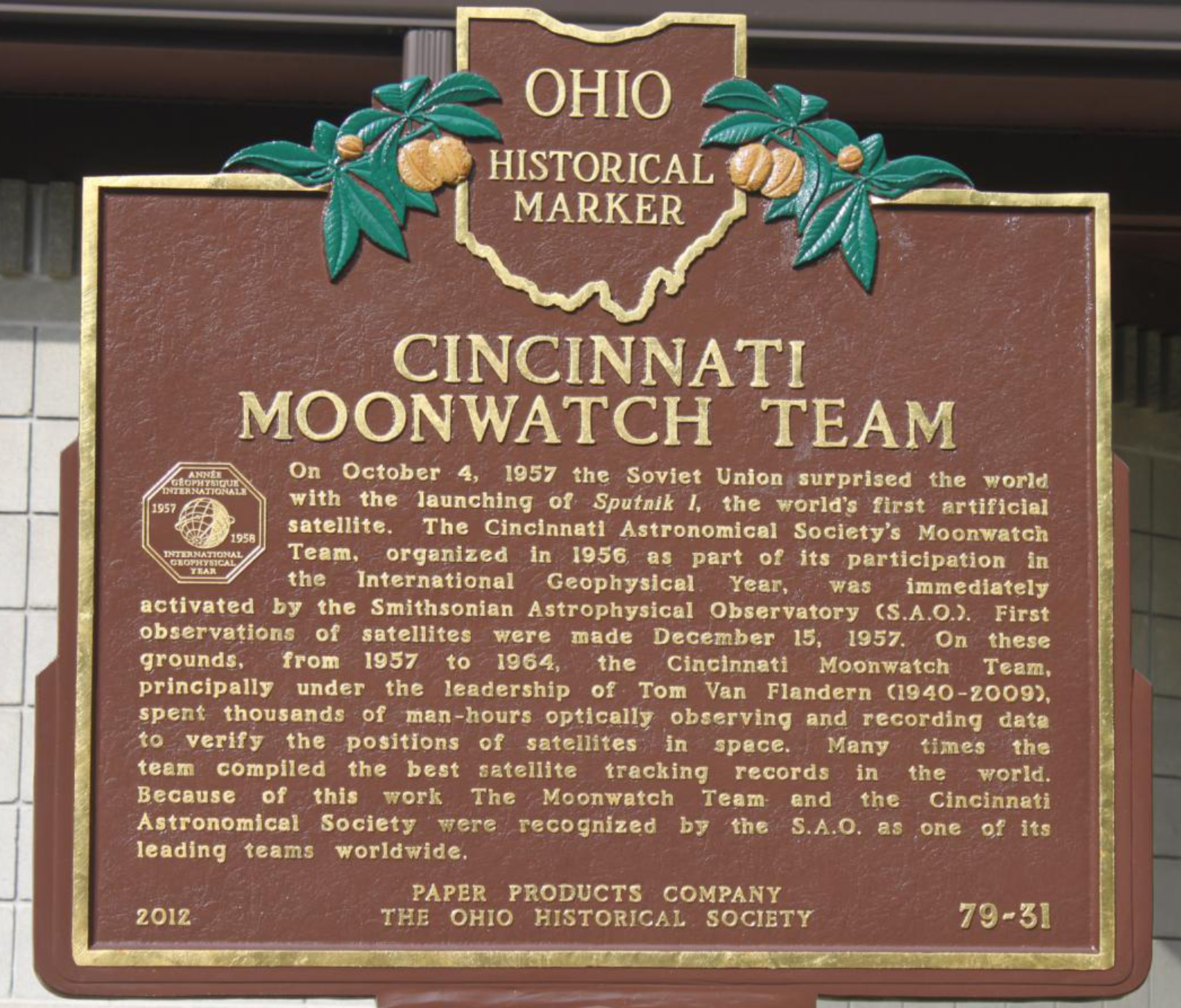
Van Flandern mentioned in historical marker about Project Moonwatch. Placed by Cincinnati Astronomical Society and the city of Cincinnati, OH

Tom Van Flandern was the first child of Robert F. Van Flandern, a police officer, and Anna Mary Haley. His father left the family when Tom was 5. His mother died when he was 16; he and his siblings then lived with their grandmother, Margery Jobe, until he went to college. He graduated from Saint Ignatius High School in Cleveland. While there, he helped start the Cleveland branch of Operation Moonwatch, an amateur science program initiated by the Smithsonian Astrophysical Observatory to track satellites. He also helped found a Moonwatchers team while studying at Xavier University; this team broke a tracking record in 1961.

Van Flandern graduated from Xavier University with a B.S. in mathematics (cum laude) in 1962 and was awarded a teaching fellowship at Georgetown University. He attended Yale University on a scholarship sponsored by the U.S. Naval Observatory (USNO), joining USNO in 1963. In 1969, he received a Ph.D. in astronomy from Yale after completing his dissertation on lunar occultations.

Van Flandern worked at the USNO until 1983, first becoming Chief of the Research Branch and later becoming Chief of the Celestial Mechanics Branch of the Nautical Almanac Office. His espousal of highly non-mainstream beliefs, particularly the exploded planet hypothesis, eventually led to his separation from the USNO. He later said, "This forced me to the 'fringes,' areas of astronomy not accepted as credible by experts of the field".

Following his separation from the USNO, Van Flandern started a business organizing eclipse-viewing expeditions and promoting his non-mainstream views in a newsletter and website. Shortly after he died in 2009, the asteroid 52266 Van Flandern was named in his honor because of his prediction and analysis of lunar occultations at the U.S. Naval Observatory and publications of papers on the dynamics of binary minor planets.

He married Barbara Ann Weber (1942-2018) in 1963 in Kentucky, and they had three sons, Michael, Brian, and Kevin, and a daughter, Connie. The couple moved to Sequim, Washington, from the East Coast in 2005 to be closer to their children and grandchildren.

Tom Van Flandern died of colon cancer in Seattle, Washington.

== Mainstream scientific work ==
During the mid-1970s, Van Flandern believed that lunar observations gave evidence of variation in Newton's gravitational constant (G), consistent with a speculative idea that had been put forward by Paul Dirac. In 1974, his essay "A Determination of the Rate of Change of G" was awarded second place by the Gravity Research Foundation. However, in later years, with new data available, Van Flandern himself admitted his findings were flawed and contradicted by more accurate findings based on radio measurements with the Viking landers.

Van Flandern and Henry Fliegel developed a compact algorithm to calculate a Julian date from a Gregorian date that would fit on a single IBM card. They described this in a letter to the editor of a computing magazine in 1968. This was available for use in business applications.

With Kenneth Pulkkinen, he published "Low precision formulae for planetary positions" in the Astrophysical Journal Supplement in 1979. The paper set a record for the number of reprints requested from that journal.

Following claims by David Dunham in 1978 to have detected satellites for some asteroids (notably 532 Herculina) by examining the light patterns during stellar occultations, Van Flandern and others began to report similar observations. His non-mainstream 1978 prediction that some asteroids have natural satellites, which was almost universally rejected at the time, was later proven correct when the Galileo spacecraft photographed Dactyl, a satellite of 243 Ida, during its flyby in 1993.

== Non-mainstream science and beliefs ==
Van Flandern described in his 1993 book Dark Matter, Missing Planets, New Comets how he had become increasingly dissatisfied with the mainstream views of science by the early 1980s. He wrote:

"Events in my life caused me to start questioning my goals and the correctness of everything I had learned. In matters of religion, medicine, biology, physics, and other fields, I came to discover that reality differed seriously from what I had been taught."

In his book, on blogs, lectures, newsletters, and websites, Van Flandern focused on problems in cosmology and physics. He alleged that when experimental evidence is incompatible with mainstream scientific theories, mainstream scientists refuse to acknowledge this to avoid jeopardizing their funding.

=== Exploding planets ===
In 1976, while Van Flandern worked for the USNO, he began to promote the belief that major planets sometimes explode. Van Flandern also speculated that the origin of the human species may well have been on the planet Mars, which he believed was once a moon of a now-exploded "Planet V".

=== Le Sage's theory of gravitation and the speed of gravity ===
Van Flandern supported Georges-Louis Le Sage's theory of gravitation, according to which gravity is the result of a flux of invisible "ultra-mundane corpuscles" impinging on all objects from all directions at superluminal speeds. He gave public lectures in which he claimed that these particles could be used as a limitless source of free energy and to provide superluminal propulsion for spacecraft.

In 1998 Van Flandern wrote a paper asserting that astronomical observations imply that gravity propagates at least twenty billion times faster than light, or even infinitely fast. Gerald E. Marsh, Charles Nissim-Sabat and Steve Carlip demonstrated that Van Flandern's argument was fallacious.

=== Face on Mars ===
Van Flandern was a prominent advocate of the belief that certain geological features seen on Mars, especially the "face at Cydonia", are not of natural origin but were produced by intelligent extraterrestrial life, probably the inhabitants of a major planet once located where the asteroid belt presently exists, and which Van Flandern believed had exploded 3.2 million years ago. The claimed artificiality of the "face" was also the topic of a chapter of his 1993 book.

=== Rejection of Big Bang cosmology ===
Van Flandern was a vocal opponent of the Big Bang model in cosmology and believed in a static universe instead. In 2008, he organized the "Crisis in Cosmology"; a conference of individuals who opposed the Big Bang cosmological models.
