= Arianna Gleason =

American physicist and planetary scientist

Arianna Elizabeth Gleason Holbrook (born 1980) is an American condensed matter physicist and planetary scientist who studies the behavior of matter in extreme conditions of pressure and temperature, as can be found at the cores of planets and stars, in planetary collisions, during certain kinds of explosion, and, on a smaller scale, in cavitation. Gleason works at the SLAC National Accelerator Laboratory as a staff scientist and deputy division director in the Fundamental Physics Directorate, High Energy Density Science Division, and as an adjunct faculty member at Stanford University in its departments of geological science and mechanical engineering.

== Education and career ==
Gleason majored in geosciences at the University of Arizona, where she received her bachelor's degree in 2003. After interning at the Lawrence Berkeley National Laboratory, she went on to graduate study in Earth and planetary science at the University of California, Berkeley, where she completed her Ph.D. in 2010, supervised by Raymond Jeanloz.

She became a postdoctoral researcher at Stanford University in 2010, working with Wendy Mao, and continued as a Frederick Reines and Director’s Postdoctoral Fellow at the Los Alamos National Laboratory from 2014 to 2018. She obtained a permanent position as a staff scientist at SLAC in 2018.

== Research ==
As a student attending the University of Arizona, Gleason worked in the Spacewatch project; her discoveries through the project included multiple minor planets as well as C/2003 A2 (Gleason), a comet. As of 2022, it still had the most distant perihelion (the closest point in its orbit to the sun) of any known long-period comet.

Her research on materials in extreme environments has included the unexpected discovery of weaknesses and non-uniform structure in the solid iron and nickel of Earth's inner core. She has also found ways to create ice VII and superionic ice, exotic forms of water, by using intense laser light to vaporize a target sandwiching water between thin diamond crystals.

She served as principal investigator of an experiment at the SLAC National Accelerator Laboratory that investigated the behavior of silicon under extreme shock compression. Using ultrafast X-ray pulses from the Linac Coherent Light Source, the research team observed how a single-crystal silicon sample deformed at nanosecond timescales. The findings helped clarify the mechanisms through which silicon responds to extreme pressure.

== Recognition ==
Gleason was the 2014 recipient of the inaugural Mineral and Rock Physics Early Career Award of the American Geophysical Union Mineral and Rock Physics Focus Group. She was a 2019 recipient of the DOE Early Career Award, and a 2025 recipient of the Presidential Early Career Award for Scientists and Engineers.

Minor planet 10639 Gleason is named for Gleason.
