= Walter Ferreri =

Italian astronomer (born 1948)

Minor planets discovered: 15
3625 Fracastoro	27 April 1984	list
3778 Regge	26 April 1984	list
4061 Martelli	19 March 1988	list
4398 Chiara	23 April 1984	list
4478 Blanco^{[A]}	23 April 1984	list
4821 Bianucci	5 March 1986	list
5003 Silvanominuto	15 March 1988	list
5022 Roccapalumba	23 April 1984	list
6114 Dalla-Degregori	28 April 1984	list
6289 Lanusei^{[A]}	28 April 1984	list
7396 Brusin	4 March 1986	list
10738 Marcoaldo	17 March 1988	list
19968 Palazzolascaris	19 March 1988	list
(21007) 1988 FD_{3}	19 March 1988	list
52267 Rotarytorino	4 March 1986	list
1. ^{A} with V. Zappalà

Walter Ferreri (born 1948), originally from Buddusò in Sardinia, is an astronomer at the Italian Osservatorio Astronomico di Torino, science writer and discoverer of minor planets.

He is a member of the "Division III Commission 20 Positions & Motions of Minor Planets, Comets & Satellites" and the "Division III Planetary Systems Sciences" at the IAU. He is credited by the Minor Planet Center with the discovery of 15 numbered minor planets he made at the La Silla Observatory site in Chile between 1984 and 1988.

The outer main-belt asteroid 3308 Ferreri, discovered by astronomers Henri Debehogne and Giovanni de Sanctis, is named after him for his contributions to and popularization of astronomy. Naming citation was published on 14 April 1987 (M.P.C. 11750).
