= Brian G. W. Manning =

English astronomer

- Born: 14 May 1926; Handsworth, Birmingham, England
- Died: 10 November 2011 (aged 85); Nightingales Residential home, Worcestershire, England
- Occupation: Astronomer

Brian George William Manning (14 May 1926 – 10 November 2011) was an English astronomer who discovered 19 minor planets. He was born in 1926 in Birmingham. He constructed his first mirror from a piece of glass that a World War II bomb blew out of the roof of the factory where his father worked. He began as an engineering draughtsman but later became a metrologist at the University of Birmingham. In the late 1950s, he constructed an interference-controlled ruling machine in a home workshop, which was able to rule high-quality 3 by 2 inch gratings. In 1990, he received the H. E. Dall prize of the BAA.

== Discoveries ==
Brian Manning is credited by the Minor Planet Center with the discovery of 19 minor planets he made at Stakenbridge Observatory (494), near Kidderminster, England, between 1989 and 1997. All of his discovered minor planets are asteroids of the main-belt:

Discoveries by Brian G. W. Manning (i)
Object	Date	MPC
4751 Alicemanning	17 January 1991	MPC
4506 Hendrie	24 March 1990	MPC
7239 Mobberley	4 October 1989	MPC
7465 Munkanber	31 October 1989	MPC
7519 Paulcook	31 October 1989	MPC
7573 Basfifty	4 November 1989	MPC
6156 Dall	12 January 1991	MPC
6191 Eades	22 November 1989	MPC
8166 Buczynski	12 January 1991	MPC
8545 McGee	2 January 1994	MPC
8914 Nickjames	25 December 1995	MPC
10381 Malinsmith	3 September 1996	MPC
10515 Old Joe	31 October 1989	MPC
10538 Torode	11 November 1991	MPC
15347 Colinstuart	26 October 1994	MPC
24728 Scagell	11 November 1991	MPC
52633 Turvey	30 November 1997	MPC
(69273) 1989 TN_{1}	4 October 1989	MPC
(100690) 1997 YY_{6}	25 December 1997	MPC
