= List of minor planets: 52001–53000 =

The following is a partial list of minor planets, running from minor-planet number 52001 through 53000, inclusive. The primary data for this and other partial lists is based on JPL's "Small-Body Orbital Elements" and data available from the Minor Planet Center. Critical list information is also provided by the MPC, unless otherwise specified from Lowell Observatory. A detailed description of the table's columns and additional sources are given on the main page including a complete list of every page in this series, and a statistical break-up on the dynamical classification of minor planets.

Also see the summary list of all named bodies in numerical and alphabetical order, and the corresponding naming citations for the number range of this particular list. New namings may only be added to this list after official publication, as the preannouncement of names is condemned by the Working Group for Small Bodies Nomenclature of the International Astronomical Union.

Near-Earth obj.	MBA (inner)	MBA (outer)	Centaur
Mars-crosser	MBA (middle)	Jupiter trojan	Trans-Neptunian obj.
Unclassified

== 52001–52100 ==
Designation			Discovery			Properties		Ref
Permanent	Provisional	Named after	Date	Site	Discoverer(s)	Category	Diam.	Ref
52001	2001 UO_{30}	—	October 16, 2001	Socorro	LINEAR	slow	6.7 km	MPC · JPL
52002	2001 UT_{30}	—	October 16, 2001	Socorro	LINEAR	EOS	6.7 km	MPC · JPL
52003	2001 VB_{77}	—	November 8, 2001	Palomar	NEAT	·	16 km	MPC · JPL
52004	2001 YH_{2}	—	December 18, 2001	Kingsnake	J. V. McClusky	TEL	5.0 km	MPC · JPL
52005 Maik	2002 CL_{13}	Maik	February 8, 2002	Fountain Hills	C. W. Juels, P. R. Holvorcem	PHO	4.5 km	MPC · JPL
52006	2002 EK_{31}	—	March 10, 2002	Socorro	LINEAR	·	4.8 km	MPC · JPL
52007	2002 EQ_{47}	—	March 12, 2002	Palomar	NEAT	T_{j} (2.92)	10 km	MPC · JPL
52008 Johnnaka	2002 EP_{111}	Johnnaka	March 9, 2002	Catalina	CSS	·	8.0 km	MPC · JPL
52009	2002 EU_{146}	—	March 14, 2002	Anderson Mesa	LONEOS	KOR	2.8 km	MPC · JPL
52010	2002 JA_{59}	—	May 9, 2002	Socorro	LINEAR	·	4.6 km	MPC · JPL
52011	2002 LW_{19}	—	June 6, 2002	Socorro	LINEAR	slow?	3.5 km	MPC · JPL
52012	2002 LQ_{55}	—	June 15, 2002	Socorro	LINEAR	·	8.9 km	MPC · JPL
52013	2002 LJ_{59}	—	June 12, 2002	Anderson Mesa	LONEOS	·	3.6 km	MPC · JPL
52014	2002 NZ_{13}	—	July 4, 2002	Palomar	NEAT	NYS	1.9 km	MPC · JPL
52015	2002 NG_{17}	—	July 13, 2002	Socorro	LINEAR	PHO	3.5 km	MPC · JPL
52016	2002 NO_{18}	—	July 9, 2002	Socorro	LINEAR	T_{j} (2.99) · 3:2	14 km	MPC · JPL
52017	2002 NB_{27}	—	July 9, 2002	Socorro	LINEAR	·	2.3 km	MPC · JPL
52018	2002 NO_{27}	—	July 9, 2002	Socorro	LINEAR	·	6.8 km	MPC · JPL
52019	2002 NO_{32}	—	July 13, 2002	Socorro	LINEAR	·	5.0 km	MPC · JPL
52020	2002 NM_{33}	—	July 14, 2002	Socorro	LINEAR	EUN	3.4 km	MPC · JPL
52021	2002 NK_{39}	—	July 13, 2002	Socorro	LINEAR	·	3.1 km	MPC · JPL
52022	2002 NQ_{52}	—	July 14, 2002	Palomar	NEAT	·	1.7 km	MPC · JPL
52023	2002 OH_{3}	—	July 17, 2002	Socorro	LINEAR	EOS	6.3 km	MPC · JPL
52024	2002 OH_{4}	—	July 17, 2002	Socorro	LINEAR	EOS	6.6 km	MPC · JPL
52025	2002 OR_{17}	—	July 18, 2002	Socorro	LINEAR	EOS	5.5 km	MPC · JPL
52026	2002 OA_{24}	—	July 28, 2002	Haleakala	NEAT	·	8.2 km	MPC · JPL
52027	2002 OB_{24}	—	July 28, 2002	Haleakala	NEAT	·	10 km	MPC · JPL
52028	2002 PT_{29}	—	August 6, 2002	Palomar	NEAT	(5)	3.2 km	MPC · JPL
52029	2002 PN_{32}	—	August 6, 2002	Palomar	NEAT	·	3.4 km	MPC · JPL
52030 Maxvasile	2002 PX_{33}	Maxvasile	August 6, 2002	Campo Imperatore	CINEOS	·	2.8 km	MPC · JPL
52031	2002 PU_{35}	—	August 6, 2002	Palomar	NEAT	·	2.4 km	MPC · JPL
52032	2002 PK_{37}	—	August 5, 2002	Socorro	LINEAR	·	3.3 km	MPC · JPL
52033	2002 PT_{41}	—	August 5, 2002	Socorro	LINEAR	MAS	1.5 km	MPC · JPL
52034	2002 PX_{42}	—	August 9, 2002	Ametlla de Mar	J. Nomen	·	3.7 km	MPC · JPL
52035	2002 PS_{43}	—	August 4, 2002	Socorro	LINEAR	·	5.8 km	MPC · JPL
52036	2002 PV_{46}	—	August 9, 2002	Socorro	LINEAR	·	1.8 km	MPC · JPL
52037	2002 PR_{47}	—	August 10, 2002	Socorro	LINEAR	·	8.4 km	MPC · JPL
52038	2002 PX_{48}	—	August 10, 2002	Socorro	LINEAR	EUN	4.2 km	MPC · JPL
52039	2002 PB_{59}	—	August 10, 2002	Socorro	LINEAR	EUN	3.5 km	MPC · JPL
52040	2002 PJ_{61}	—	August 11, 2002	Socorro	LINEAR	(5)	2.3 km	MPC · JPL
52041	2002 PT_{61}	—	August 11, 2002	Socorro	LINEAR	·	3.8 km	MPC · JPL
52042	2002 PH_{63}	—	August 8, 2002	Palomar	NEAT	·	4.1 km	MPC · JPL
52043	2002 PM_{75}	—	August 12, 2002	Socorro	LINEAR	·	2.2 km	MPC · JPL
52044	2002 PN_{75}	—	August 12, 2002	Socorro	LINEAR	ERI	3.2 km	MPC · JPL
52045	2002 PE_{80}	—	August 4, 2002	Palomar	NEAT	MAR	2.8 km	MPC · JPL
52046	2002 PH_{83}	—	August 10, 2002	Socorro	LINEAR	·	1.4 km	MPC · JPL
52047	2002 PC_{85}	—	August 10, 2002	Socorro	LINEAR	·	7.3 km	MPC · JPL
52048	2002 PL_{92}	—	August 14, 2002	Socorro	LINEAR	·	4.7 km	MPC · JPL
52049	2002 PL_{95}	—	August 14, 2002	Socorro	LINEAR	NYS	2.3 km	MPC · JPL
52050	2002 PV_{96}	—	August 14, 2002	Socorro	LINEAR	·	2.2 km	MPC · JPL
52051	2002 PA_{97}	—	August 14, 2002	Socorro	LINEAR	·	3.4 km	MPC · JPL
52052	2002 PJ_{115}	—	August 12, 2002	Socorro	LINEAR	·	5.4 km	MPC · JPL
52053	2002 PQ_{119}	—	August 13, 2002	Anderson Mesa	LONEOS	·	4.6 km	MPC · JPL
52054	2002 PB_{121}	—	August 13, 2002	Anderson Mesa	LONEOS	·	4.0 km	MPC · JPL
52055	2002 PR_{126}	—	August 14, 2002	Socorro	LINEAR	·	1.4 km	MPC · JPL
52056	2002 PO_{130}	—	August 14, 2002	Socorro	LINEAR	·	1.6 km	MPC · JPL
52057 Clarkhowell	2002 PS_{130}	Clarkhowell	August 15, 2002	Tenagra	M. Schwartz, P. R. Holvorcem	·	4.2 km	MPC · JPL
52058	2002 PQ_{132}	—	August 14, 2002	Socorro	LINEAR	MAS	1.7 km	MPC · JPL
52059	2002 PH_{133}	—	August 14, 2002	Socorro	LINEAR	·	1.9 km	MPC · JPL
52060	2002 QJ_{7}	—	August 16, 2002	Palomar	NEAT	PHO	5.1 km	MPC · JPL
52061	2002 QR_{9}	—	August 20, 2002	Palomar	NEAT	·	5.1 km	MPC · JPL
52062	2002 QL_{12}	—	August 26, 2002	Palomar	NEAT	·	4.5 km	MPC · JPL
52063	2002 QS_{18}	—	August 26, 2002	Palomar	NEAT	·	3.6 km	MPC · JPL
52064	2002 QH_{20}	—	August 28, 2002	Palomar	NEAT	·	5.2 km	MPC · JPL
52065	2002 QA_{23}	—	August 27, 2002	Palomar	NEAT	·	1.8 km	MPC · JPL
52066	2002 QF_{27}	—	August 28, 2002	Palomar	NEAT	·	2.0 km	MPC · JPL
52067	2002 QE_{36}	—	August 29, 2002	Ametlla de Mar	Ametlla de Mar	·	8.4 km	MPC · JPL
52068	2002 QX_{40}	—	August 29, 2002	Palomar	NEAT	T_{j} (2.98) · 3:2	16 km	MPC · JPL
52069	2002 QJ_{41}	—	August 29, 2002	Palomar	NEAT	·	1.6 km	MPC · JPL
52070	2002 QP_{41}	—	August 29, 2002	Palomar	NEAT	·	6.9 km	MPC · JPL
52071	2002 QX_{41}	—	August 29, 2002	Palomar	NEAT	THM	6.9 km	MPC · JPL
52072	2002 QC_{45}	—	August 29, 2002	Kitt Peak	Spacewatch	(12739)	2.9 km	MPC · JPL
52073	2002 QD_{45}	—	August 29, 2002	Kitt Peak	Spacewatch	·	2.7 km	MPC · JPL
52074	2002 RJ_{2}	—	September 4, 2002	Anderson Mesa	LONEOS	·	1.4 km	MPC · JPL
52075	2002 RL_{7}	—	September 3, 2002	Palomar	NEAT	·	4.1 km	MPC · JPL
52076	2002 RE_{29}	—	September 3, 2002	El Centro	W. K. Y. Yeung	·	8.7 km	MPC · JPL
52077	2002 RJ_{30}	—	September 4, 2002	Anderson Mesa	LONEOS	·	5.5 km	MPC · JPL
52078	2002 RA_{34}	—	September 4, 2002	Anderson Mesa	LONEOS	·	2.8 km	MPC · JPL
52079	2002 RU_{61}	—	September 5, 2002	Socorro	LINEAR	3:2	10 km	MPC · JPL
52080	2002 RZ_{62}	—	September 5, 2002	Socorro	LINEAR	·	3.1 km	MPC · JPL
52081	2002 RM_{71}	—	September 5, 2002	Anderson Mesa	LONEOS	V	1.4 km	MPC · JPL
52082	2002 RU_{87}	—	September 5, 2002	Socorro	LINEAR	·	2.5 km	MPC · JPL
52083	2002 RQ_{88}	—	September 5, 2002	Socorro	LINEAR	·	1.5 km	MPC · JPL
52084	2002 RC_{93}	—	September 5, 2002	Anderson Mesa	LONEOS	·	10 km	MPC · JPL
52085	2002 RC_{102}	—	September 5, 2002	Socorro	LINEAR	(5)	2.5 km	MPC · JPL
52086	2002 RY_{108}	—	September 5, 2002	Haleakala	NEAT	·	3.5 km	MPC · JPL
52087	2002 RH_{111}	—	September 6, 2002	Socorro	LINEAR	EUN	4.7 km	MPC · JPL
52088	2014 P-L	—	September 24, 1960	Palomar	C. J. van Houten, I. van Houten-Groeneveld, T. Gehrels	·	2.9 km	MPC · JPL
52089	2027 P-L	—	September 24, 1960	Palomar	C. J. van Houten, I. van Houten-Groeneveld, T. Gehrels	NYS	2.7 km	MPC · JPL
52090	2046 P-L	—	September 24, 1960	Palomar	C. J. van Houten, I. van Houten-Groeneveld, T. Gehrels	(5)	2.6 km	MPC · JPL
52091	2075 P-L	—	September 24, 1960	Palomar	C. J. van Houten, I. van Houten-Groeneveld, T. Gehrels	(5)	4.1 km	MPC · JPL
52092	2083 P-L	—	September 24, 1960	Palomar	C. J. van Houten, I. van Houten-Groeneveld, T. Gehrels	(5)	2.4 km	MPC · JPL
52093	2088 P-L	—	September 24, 1960	Palomar	C. J. van Houten, I. van Houten-Groeneveld, T. Gehrels	HOF	5.0 km	MPC · JPL
52094	2177 P-L	—	September 24, 1960	Palomar	C. J. van Houten, I. van Houten-Groeneveld, T. Gehrels	·	3.1 km	MPC · JPL
52095	2191 P-L	—	September 24, 1960	Palomar	C. J. van Houten, I. van Houten-Groeneveld, T. Gehrels	EOS	4.0 km	MPC · JPL
52096	2221 P-L	—	September 24, 1960	Palomar	C. J. van Houten, I. van Houten-Groeneveld, T. Gehrels	·	1.1 km	MPC · JPL
52097	2565 P-L	—	September 24, 1960	Palomar	C. J. van Houten, I. van Houten-Groeneveld, T. Gehrels	·	4.0 km	MPC · JPL
52098	2568 P-L	—	September 24, 1960	Palomar	C. J. van Houten, I. van Houten-Groeneveld, T. Gehrels	AGN	3.9 km	MPC · JPL
52099	2589 P-L	—	September 24, 1960	Palomar	C. J. van Houten, I. van Houten-Groeneveld, T. Gehrels	·	4.6 km	MPC · JPL
52100	2591 P-L	—	September 24, 1960	Palomar	C. J. van Houten, I. van Houten-Groeneveld, T. Gehrels	·	6.4 km	MPC · JPL

== 52101–52200 ==
back to top

Designation			Discovery			Properties		Ref
Permanent	Provisional	Named after	Date	Site	Discoverer(s)	Category	Diam.	Ref
52101	2598 P-L	—	September 24, 1960	Palomar	C. J. van Houten, I. van Houten-Groeneveld, T. Gehrels	HOF	7.5 km	MPC · JPL
52102	2616 P-L	—	September 24, 1960	Palomar	C. J. van Houten, I. van Houten-Groeneveld, T. Gehrels	·	2.6 km	MPC · JPL
52103	2658 P-L	—	September 24, 1960	Palomar	C. J. van Houten, I. van Houten-Groeneveld, T. Gehrels	V	1.8 km	MPC · JPL
52104	2660 P-L	—	September 24, 1960	Palomar	C. J. van Houten, I. van Houten-Groeneveld, T. Gehrels	·	6.1 km	MPC · JPL
52105	2669 P-L	—	September 24, 1960	Palomar	C. J. van Houten, I. van Houten-Groeneveld, T. Gehrels	·	1.6 km	MPC · JPL
52106	2673 P-L	—	September 24, 1960	Palomar	C. J. van Houten, I. van Houten-Groeneveld, T. Gehrels	AST	4.3 km	MPC · JPL
52107	2703 P-L	—	September 24, 1960	Palomar	C. J. van Houten, I. van Houten-Groeneveld, T. Gehrels	·	1.8 km	MPC · JPL
52108	2830 P-L	—	September 24, 1960	Palomar	C. J. van Houten, I. van Houten-Groeneveld, T. Gehrels	·	3.9 km	MPC · JPL
52109	2863 P-L	—	September 24, 1960	Palomar	C. J. van Houten, I. van Houten-Groeneveld, T. Gehrels	·	4.7 km	MPC · JPL
52110	3007 P-L	—	September 24, 1960	Palomar	C. J. van Houten, I. van Houten-Groeneveld, T. Gehrels	·	2.6 km	MPC · JPL
52111	3020 P-L	—	September 24, 1960	Palomar	C. J. van Houten, I. van Houten-Groeneveld, T. Gehrels	EOS	6.5 km	MPC · JPL
52112	3064 P-L	—	September 25, 1960	Palomar	C. J. van Houten, I. van Houten-Groeneveld, T. Gehrels	·	2.2 km	MPC · JPL
52113	3100 P-L	—	September 24, 1960	Palomar	C. J. van Houten, I. van Houten-Groeneveld, T. Gehrels	EOS	7.5 km	MPC · JPL
52114	3118 P-L	—	September 24, 1960	Palomar	C. J. van Houten, I. van Houten-Groeneveld, T. Gehrels	·	3.6 km	MPC · JPL
52115	3512 P-L	—	October 17, 1960	Palomar	C. J. van Houten, I. van Houten-Groeneveld, T. Gehrels	·	6.7 km	MPC · JPL
52116	4032 P-L	—	September 24, 1960	Palomar	C. J. van Houten, I. van Houten-Groeneveld, T. Gehrels	·	2.9 km	MPC · JPL
52117	4059 P-L	—	September 24, 1960	Palomar	C. J. van Houten, I. van Houten-Groeneveld, T. Gehrels	(5)	1.9 km	MPC · JPL
52118	4103 P-L	—	September 24, 1960	Palomar	C. J. van Houten, I. van Houten-Groeneveld, T. Gehrels	·	2.3 km	MPC · JPL
52119	4105 P-L	—	September 24, 1960	Palomar	C. J. van Houten, I. van Houten-Groeneveld, T. Gehrels	(5)	2.9 km	MPC · JPL
52120	4106 P-L	—	September 24, 1960	Palomar	C. J. van Houten, I. van Houten-Groeneveld, T. Gehrels	·	6.0 km	MPC · JPL
52121	4117 P-L	—	September 24, 1960	Palomar	C. J. van Houten, I. van Houten-Groeneveld, T. Gehrels	AGN	3.0 km	MPC · JPL
52122	4128 P-L	—	September 24, 1960	Palomar	C. J. van Houten, I. van Houten-Groeneveld, T. Gehrels	EOS	5.8 km	MPC · JPL
52123	4217 P-L	—	September 24, 1960	Palomar	C. J. van Houten, I. van Houten-Groeneveld, T. Gehrels	·	2.4 km	MPC · JPL
52124	4272 P-L	—	September 24, 1960	Palomar	C. J. van Houten, I. van Houten-Groeneveld, T. Gehrels	·	2.2 km	MPC · JPL
52125	4274 P-L	—	September 24, 1960	Palomar	C. J. van Houten, I. van Houten-Groeneveld, T. Gehrels	·	3.6 km	MPC · JPL
52126	4284 P-L	—	September 24, 1960	Palomar	C. J. van Houten, I. van Houten-Groeneveld, T. Gehrels	V	1.4 km	MPC · JPL
52127	4681 P-L	—	September 24, 1960	Palomar	C. J. van Houten, I. van Houten-Groeneveld, T. Gehrels	EOS	4.2 km	MPC · JPL
52128	4693 P-L	—	September 24, 1960	Palomar	C. J. van Houten, I. van Houten-Groeneveld, T. Gehrels	·	2.1 km	MPC · JPL
52129	4796 P-L	—	September 24, 1960	Palomar	C. J. van Houten, I. van Houten-Groeneveld, T. Gehrels	NYS	1.4 km	MPC · JPL
52130	4882 P-L	—	September 26, 1960	Palomar	C. J. van Houten, I. van Houten-Groeneveld, T. Gehrels	·	3.5 km	MPC · JPL
52131	4892 P-L	—	September 24, 1960	Palomar	C. J. van Houten, I. van Houten-Groeneveld, T. Gehrels	EOS	3.6 km	MPC · JPL
52132	5034 P-L	—	October 17, 1960	Palomar	C. J. van Houten, I. van Houten-Groeneveld, T. Gehrels	·	2.4 km	MPC · JPL
52133	6007 P-L	—	September 24, 1960	Palomar	C. J. van Houten, I. van Houten-Groeneveld, T. Gehrels	·	4.7 km	MPC · JPL
52134	6059 P-L	—	September 24, 1960	Palomar	C. J. van Houten, I. van Houten-Groeneveld, T. Gehrels	HOF	9.7 km	MPC · JPL
52135	6070 P-L	—	September 24, 1960	Palomar	C. J. van Houten, I. van Houten-Groeneveld, T. Gehrels	·	6.6 km	MPC · JPL
52136	6076 P-L	—	September 24, 1960	Palomar	C. J. van Houten, I. van Houten-Groeneveld, T. Gehrels	·	2.7 km	MPC · JPL
52137	6080 P-L	—	September 24, 1960	Palomar	C. J. van Houten, I. van Houten-Groeneveld, T. Gehrels	NYS	2.5 km	MPC · JPL
52138	6131 P-L	—	September 24, 1960	Palomar	C. J. van Houten, I. van Houten-Groeneveld, T. Gehrels	·	3.7 km	MPC · JPL
52139	6192 P-L	—	September 24, 1960	Palomar	C. J. van Houten, I. van Houten-Groeneveld, T. Gehrels	·	5.2 km	MPC · JPL
52140	6603 P-L	—	September 24, 1960	Palomar	C. J. van Houten, I. van Houten-Groeneveld, T. Gehrels	·	3.5 km	MPC · JPL
52141	6605 P-L	—	September 24, 1960	Palomar	C. J. van Houten, I. van Houten-Groeneveld, T. Gehrels	·	3.2 km	MPC · JPL
52142	6610 P-L	—	September 24, 1960	Palomar	C. J. van Houten, I. van Houten-Groeneveld, T. Gehrels	·	5.1 km	MPC · JPL
52143	6635 P-L	—	September 24, 1960	Palomar	C. J. van Houten, I. van Houten-Groeneveld, T. Gehrels	NYS	2.8 km	MPC · JPL
52144	6759 P-L	—	September 24, 1960	Palomar	C. J. van Houten, I. van Houten-Groeneveld, T. Gehrels	·	2.1 km	MPC · JPL
52145	6832 P-L	—	September 24, 1960	Palomar	C. J. van Houten, I. van Houten-Groeneveld, T. Gehrels	MAS	2.3 km	MPC · JPL
52146	7061 P-L	—	October 17, 1960	Palomar	C. J. van Houten, I. van Houten-Groeneveld, T. Gehrels	V	1.8 km	MPC · JPL
52147	9061 P-L	—	October 17, 1960	Palomar	C. J. van Houten, I. van Houten-Groeneveld, T. Gehrels	(5)	2.9 km	MPC · JPL
52148	9506 P-L	—	October 17, 1960	Palomar	C. J. van Houten, I. van Houten-Groeneveld, T. Gehrels	·	3.4 km	MPC · JPL
52149	1074 T-1	—	March 25, 1971	Palomar	C. J. van Houten, I. van Houten-Groeneveld, T. Gehrels	·	7.0 km	MPC · JPL
52150	1097 T-1	—	March 25, 1971	Palomar	C. J. van Houten, I. van Houten-Groeneveld, T. Gehrels	·	3.0 km	MPC · JPL
52151	1180 T-1	—	March 25, 1971	Palomar	C. J. van Houten, I. van Houten-Groeneveld, T. Gehrels	(254)	2.0 km	MPC · JPL
52152	1296 T-1	—	March 25, 1971	Palomar	C. J. van Houten, I. van Houten-Groeneveld, T. Gehrels	·	3.5 km	MPC · JPL
52153	2043 T-1	—	March 25, 1971	Palomar	C. J. van Houten, I. van Houten-Groeneveld, T. Gehrels	·	3.2 km	MPC · JPL
52154	2152 T-1	—	March 25, 1971	Palomar	C. J. van Houten, I. van Houten-Groeneveld, T. Gehrels	·	6.9 km	MPC · JPL
52155	2236 T-1	—	March 25, 1971	Palomar	C. J. van Houten, I. van Houten-Groeneveld, T. Gehrels	·	4.9 km	MPC · JPL
52156	4100 T-1	—	March 26, 1971	Palomar	C. J. van Houten, I. van Houten-Groeneveld, T. Gehrels	NYS	3.5 km	MPC · JPL
52157	4126 T-1	—	March 26, 1971	Palomar	C. J. van Houten, I. van Houten-Groeneveld, T. Gehrels	·	7.5 km	MPC · JPL
52158	4175 T-1	—	March 26, 1971	Palomar	C. J. van Houten, I. van Houten-Groeneveld, T. Gehrels	·	2.7 km	MPC · JPL
52159	4178 T-1	—	March 26, 1971	Palomar	C. J. van Houten, I. van Houten-Groeneveld, T. Gehrels	NYS	3.2 km	MPC · JPL
52160	4229 T-1	—	March 26, 1971	Palomar	C. J. van Houten, I. van Houten-Groeneveld, T. Gehrels	·	2.9 km	MPC · JPL
52161	4302 T-1	—	March 26, 1971	Palomar	C. J. van Houten, I. van Houten-Groeneveld, T. Gehrels	·	3.2 km	MPC · JPL
52162	4357 T-1	—	March 26, 1971	Palomar	C. J. van Houten, I. van Houten-Groeneveld, T. Gehrels	THM	8.6 km	MPC · JPL
52163	1004 T-2	—	September 29, 1973	Palomar	C. J. van Houten, I. van Houten-Groeneveld, T. Gehrels	·	4.7 km	MPC · JPL
52164	1012 T-2	—	September 29, 1973	Palomar	C. J. van Houten, I. van Houten-Groeneveld, T. Gehrels	·	2.6 km	MPC · JPL
52165	1099 T-2	—	September 29, 1973	Palomar	C. J. van Houten, I. van Houten-Groeneveld, T. Gehrels	·	2.1 km	MPC · JPL
52166	1184 T-2	—	September 29, 1973	Palomar	C. J. van Houten, I. van Houten-Groeneveld, T. Gehrels	·	4.7 km	MPC · JPL
52167	1220 T-2	—	September 29, 1973	Palomar	C. J. van Houten, I. van Houten-Groeneveld, T. Gehrels	THM	7.4 km	MPC · JPL
52168	1305 T-2	—	September 29, 1973	Palomar	C. J. van Houten, I. van Houten-Groeneveld, T. Gehrels	V	1.7 km	MPC · JPL
52169	1494 T-2	—	September 29, 1973	Palomar	C. J. van Houten, I. van Houten-Groeneveld, T. Gehrels	·	2.7 km	MPC · JPL
52170	2046 T-2	—	September 29, 1973	Palomar	C. J. van Houten, I. van Houten-Groeneveld, T. Gehrels	·	2.4 km	MPC · JPL
52171	2127 T-2	—	September 29, 1973	Palomar	C. J. van Houten, I. van Houten-Groeneveld, T. Gehrels	·	2.9 km	MPC · JPL
52172	2166 T-2	—	September 29, 1973	Palomar	C. J. van Houten, I. van Houten-Groeneveld, T. Gehrels	·	10 km	MPC · JPL
52173	2178 T-2	—	September 29, 1973	Palomar	C. J. van Houten, I. van Houten-Groeneveld, T. Gehrels	KOR	3.3 km	MPC · JPL
52174	2183 T-2	—	September 29, 1973	Palomar	C. J. van Houten, I. van Houten-Groeneveld, T. Gehrels	(5)	3.4 km	MPC · JPL
52175	2204 T-2	—	September 29, 1973	Palomar	C. J. van Houten, I. van Houten-Groeneveld, T. Gehrels	·	5.3 km	MPC · JPL
52176	2233 T-2	—	September 29, 1973	Palomar	C. J. van Houten, I. van Houten-Groeneveld, T. Gehrels	·	4.4 km	MPC · JPL
52177	2235 T-2	—	September 29, 1973	Palomar	C. J. van Houten, I. van Houten-Groeneveld, T. Gehrels	·	7.1 km	MPC · JPL
52178	2244 T-2	—	September 29, 1973	Palomar	C. J. van Houten, I. van Houten-Groeneveld, T. Gehrels	·	2.9 km	MPC · JPL
52179	2270 T-2	—	September 29, 1973	Palomar	C. J. van Houten, I. van Houten-Groeneveld, T. Gehrels	KOR	2.9 km	MPC · JPL
52180	2273 T-2	—	September 29, 1973	Palomar	C. J. van Houten, I. van Houten-Groeneveld, T. Gehrels	HYG	6.1 km	MPC · JPL
52181	3112 T-2	—	September 30, 1973	Palomar	C. J. van Houten, I. van Houten-Groeneveld, T. Gehrels	RAF	1.9 km	MPC · JPL
52182	3130 T-2	—	September 30, 1973	Palomar	C. J. van Houten, I. van Houten-Groeneveld, T. Gehrels	·	9.1 km	MPC · JPL
52183	3286 T-2	—	September 30, 1973	Palomar	C. J. van Houten, I. van Houten-Groeneveld, T. Gehrels	·	2.5 km	MPC · JPL
52184	3361 T-2	—	September 25, 1973	Palomar	C. J. van Houten, I. van Houten-Groeneveld, T. Gehrels	·	4.0 km	MPC · JPL
52185	3370 T-2	—	September 25, 1973	Palomar	C. J. van Houten, I. van Houten-Groeneveld, T. Gehrels	(5)	2.9 km	MPC · JPL
52186	4072 T-2	—	September 29, 1973	Palomar	C. J. van Houten, I. van Houten-Groeneveld, T. Gehrels	(254)	1.3 km	MPC · JPL
52187	4125 T-2	—	September 29, 1973	Palomar	C. J. van Houten, I. van Houten-Groeneveld, T. Gehrels	·	9.7 km	MPC · JPL
52188	4142 T-2	—	September 29, 1973	Palomar	C. J. van Houten, I. van Houten-Groeneveld, T. Gehrels	·	5.2 km	MPC · JPL
52189	4215 T-2	—	September 29, 1973	Palomar	C. J. van Houten, I. van Houten-Groeneveld, T. Gehrels	·	2.5 km	MPC · JPL
52190	4241 T-2	—	September 29, 1973	Palomar	C. J. van Houten, I. van Houten-Groeneveld, T. Gehrels	·	4.4 km	MPC · JPL
52191	4263 T-2	—	September 29, 1973	Palomar	C. J. van Houten, I. van Houten-Groeneveld, T. Gehrels	NYS	2.5 km	MPC · JPL
52192	5053 T-2	—	September 25, 1973	Palomar	C. J. van Houten, I. van Houten-Groeneveld, T. Gehrels	·	3.4 km	MPC · JPL
52193	5209 T-2	—	September 25, 1973	Palomar	C. J. van Houten, I. van Houten-Groeneveld, T. Gehrels	·	7.9 km	MPC · JPL
52194	1149 T-3	—	October 17, 1977	Palomar	C. J. van Houten, I. van Houten-Groeneveld, T. Gehrels	SYL · CYB	10 km	MPC · JPL
52195	2061 T-3	—	October 16, 1977	Palomar	C. J. van Houten, I. van Houten-Groeneveld, T. Gehrels	·	1.9 km	MPC · JPL
52196	2075 T-3	—	October 16, 1977	Palomar	C. J. van Houten, I. van Houten-Groeneveld, T. Gehrels	·	3.0 km	MPC · JPL
52197	2373 T-3	—	October 16, 1977	Palomar	C. J. van Houten, I. van Houten-Groeneveld, T. Gehrels	·	3.3 km	MPC · JPL
52198	2389 T-3	—	October 16, 1977	Palomar	C. J. van Houten, I. van Houten-Groeneveld, T. Gehrels	MAR	4.0 km	MPC · JPL
52199	2465 T-3	—	October 16, 1977	Palomar	C. J. van Houten, I. van Houten-Groeneveld, T. Gehrels	·	1.9 km	MPC · JPL
52200	3094 T-3	—	October 16, 1977	Palomar	C. J. van Houten, I. van Houten-Groeneveld, T. Gehrels	·	3.2 km	MPC · JPL

== 52201–52300 ==
back to top

Designation			Discovery			Properties		Ref
Permanent	Provisional	Named after	Date	Site	Discoverer(s)	Category	Diam.	Ref
52201	3098 T-3	—	October 16, 1977	Palomar	C. J. van Houten, I. van Houten-Groeneveld, T. Gehrels	(5)	2.5 km	MPC · JPL
52202	3124 T-3	—	October 16, 1977	Palomar	C. J. van Houten, I. van Houten-Groeneveld, T. Gehrels	KOR	3.5 km	MPC · JPL
52203	3160 T-3	—	October 16, 1977	Palomar	C. J. van Houten, I. van Houten-Groeneveld, T. Gehrels	·	2.8 km	MPC · JPL
52204	3219 T-3	—	October 16, 1977	Palomar	C. J. van Houten, I. van Houten-Groeneveld, T. Gehrels	·	3.9 km	MPC · JPL
52205	3247 T-3	—	October 16, 1977	Palomar	C. J. van Houten, I. van Houten-Groeneveld, T. Gehrels	·	2.0 km	MPC · JPL
52206	3326 T-3	—	October 16, 1977	Palomar	C. J. van Houten, I. van Houten-Groeneveld, T. Gehrels	·	3.1 km	MPC · JPL
52207	3403 T-3	—	October 16, 1977	Palomar	C. J. van Houten, I. van Houten-Groeneveld, T. Gehrels	·	4.5 km	MPC · JPL
52208	3423 T-3	—	October 16, 1977	Palomar	C. J. van Houten, I. van Houten-Groeneveld, T. Gehrels	·	2.2 km	MPC · JPL
52209	3495 T-3	—	October 16, 1977	Palomar	C. J. van Houten, I. van Houten-Groeneveld, T. Gehrels	·	3.3 km	MPC · JPL
52210	4032 T-3	—	October 16, 1977	Palomar	C. J. van Houten, I. van Houten-Groeneveld, T. Gehrels	·	2.3 km	MPC · JPL
52211	4049 T-3	—	October 16, 1977	Palomar	C. J. van Houten, I. van Houten-Groeneveld, T. Gehrels	·	3.3 km	MPC · JPL
52212	4056 T-3	—	October 16, 1977	Palomar	C. J. van Houten, I. van Houten-Groeneveld, T. Gehrels	·	2.2 km	MPC · JPL
52213	4181 T-3	—	October 16, 1977	Palomar	C. J. van Houten, I. van Houten-Groeneveld, T. Gehrels	·	2.2 km	MPC · JPL
52214	4196 T-3	—	October 16, 1977	Palomar	C. J. van Houten, I. van Houten-Groeneveld, T. Gehrels	·	3.2 km	MPC · JPL
52215	4213 T-3	—	October 16, 1977	Palomar	C. J. van Houten, I. van Houten-Groeneveld, T. Gehrels	·	2.2 km	MPC · JPL
52216	5014 T-3	—	October 16, 1977	Palomar	C. J. van Houten, I. van Houten-Groeneveld, T. Gehrels	·	2.2 km	MPC · JPL
52217	5035 T-3	—	October 16, 1977	Palomar	C. J. van Houten, I. van Houten-Groeneveld, T. Gehrels	·	3.8 km	MPC · JPL
52218	5050 T-3	—	October 16, 1977	Palomar	C. J. van Houten, I. van Houten-Groeneveld, T. Gehrels	·	2.9 km	MPC · JPL
52219	5071 T-3	—	October 16, 1977	Palomar	C. J. van Houten, I. van Houten-Groeneveld, T. Gehrels	·	1.8 km	MPC · JPL
52220	5082 T-3	—	October 16, 1977	Palomar	C. J. van Houten, I. van Houten-Groeneveld, T. Gehrels	·	2.2 km	MPC · JPL
52221	5103 T-3	—	October 16, 1977	Palomar	C. J. van Houten, I. van Houten-Groeneveld, T. Gehrels	·	5.4 km	MPC · JPL
52222	5111 T-3	—	October 16, 1977	Palomar	C. J. van Houten, I. van Houten-Groeneveld, T. Gehrels	·	4.1 km	MPC · JPL
52223	5158 T-3	—	October 16, 1977	Palomar	C. J. van Houten, I. van Houten-Groeneveld, T. Gehrels	HNS	2.4 km	MPC · JPL
52224	5602 T-3	—	October 16, 1977	Palomar	C. J. van Houten, I. van Houten-Groeneveld, T. Gehrels	·	4.1 km	MPC · JPL
52225 Panchenko	1968 OF_{1}	Panchenko	July 25, 1968	Cerro El Roble	Plyugin, G. A., Yu. A. Belyaev	·	11 km	MPC · JPL
52226 Saenredam	1974 PA	Saenredam	August 12, 1974	Palomar	T. Gehrels	·	5.5 km	MPC · JPL
52227	1975 SM_{1}	—	September 30, 1975	Palomar	S. J. Bus	NYS	2.6 km	MPC · JPL
52228 Protos	1977 RN	Protos	September 5, 1977	La Silla	L. D. Schmadel	·	5.6 km	MPC · JPL
52229	1978 NN	—	July 10, 1978	Palomar	E. F. Helin, E. M. Shoemaker	·	8.7 km	MPC · JPL
52230	1978 NR	—	July 10, 1978	Palomar	E. F. Helin, E. M. Shoemaker	·	2.8 km	MPC · JPL
52231 Sitnik	1978 RX_{1}	Sitnik	September 5, 1978	Nauchnij	N. S. Chernykh	·	2.6 km	MPC · JPL
52232	1978 UY_{4}	—	October 27, 1978	Palomar	C. M. Olmstead	·	1.5 km	MPC · JPL
52233	1978 UQ_{5}	—	October 27, 1978	Palomar	C. M. Olmstead	·	9.7 km	MPC · JPL
52234	1978 UX_{7}	—	October 27, 1978	Palomar	C. M. Olmstead	·	2.8 km	MPC · JPL
52235	1979 MW_{2}	—	June 25, 1979	Siding Spring	E. F. Helin, S. J. Bus	·	10 km	MPC · JPL
52236	1979 MF_{7}	—	June 25, 1979	Siding Spring	E. F. Helin, S. J. Bus	·	6.1 km	MPC · JPL
52237	1979 OW_{2}	—	July 24, 1979	Palomar	S. J. Bus	·	8.1 km	MPC · JPL
52238	1979 OM_{9}	—	July 24, 1979	Siding Spring	S. J. Bus	·	4.1 km	MPC · JPL
52239	1979 OV_{10}	—	July 24, 1979	Siding Spring	S. J. Bus	·	4.0 km	MPC · JPL
52240	1980 FQ_{4}	—	March 16, 1980	La Silla	C.-I. Lagerkvist	·	1.4 km	MPC · JPL
52241	1980 PW_{2}	—	August 4, 1980	Siding Spring	Royal Observatory Edinburgh	·	2.9 km	MPC · JPL
52242 Michelemaoret	1981 EX	Michelemaoret	March 3, 1981	La Silla	H. Debehogne, G. de Sanctis	·	6.1 km	MPC · JPL
52243	1981 ED_{3}	—	March 2, 1981	Siding Spring	S. J. Bus	·	5.1 km	MPC · JPL
52244	1981 EE_{4}	—	March 2, 1981	Siding Spring	S. J. Bus	·	6.5 km	MPC · JPL
52245	1981 EP_{4}	—	March 2, 1981	Siding Spring	S. J. Bus	·	3.3 km	MPC · JPL
52246 Donaldjohanson	1981 EQ_{5}	Donaldjohanson	March 2, 1981	Siding Spring	S. J. Bus	·	4.8 km	MPC · JPL
52247	1981 EP_{10}	—	March 1, 1981	Siding Spring	S. J. Bus	·	3.1 km	MPC · JPL
52248	1981 EE_{15}	—	March 1, 1981	Siding Spring	S. J. Bus	·	4.4 km	MPC · JPL
52249	1981 EK_{21}	—	March 2, 1981	Siding Spring	S. J. Bus	·	6.0 km	MPC · JPL
52250	1981 EE_{32}	—	March 6, 1981	Siding Spring	S. J. Bus	·	2.6 km	MPC · JPL
52251	1981 EF_{32}	—	March 6, 1981	Siding Spring	S. J. Bus	·	3.5 km	MPC · JPL
52252	1981 EJ_{35}	—	March 2, 1981	Siding Spring	S. J. Bus	ERI	3.3 km	MPC · JPL
52253	1981 EZ_{35}	—	March 3, 1981	Siding Spring	S. J. Bus	·	5.6 km	MPC · JPL
52254	1981 EJ_{36}	—	March 7, 1981	Siding Spring	S. J. Bus	·	3.5 km	MPC · JPL
52255	1981 EM_{37}	—	March 1, 1981	Siding Spring	S. J. Bus	·	2.0 km	MPC · JPL
52256	1981 EM_{38}	—	March 1, 1981	Siding Spring	S. J. Bus	·	3.7 km	MPC · JPL
52257	1981 EJ_{42}	—	March 2, 1981	Siding Spring	S. J. Bus	·	7.4 km	MPC · JPL
52258	1981 EE_{44}	—	March 6, 1981	Siding Spring	S. J. Bus	·	4.1 km	MPC · JPL
52259	1981 EY_{47}	—	March 3, 1981	Siding Spring	S. J. Bus	·	3.5 km	MPC · JPL
52260 Ureshino	1982 KA	Ureshino	May 22, 1982	Kiso	H. Kosai, K. Furukawa	PHO	4.1 km	MPC · JPL
52261 Izumishikibu	1982 VL_{4}	Izumishikibu	November 14, 1982	Kiso	H. Kosai, K. Furukawa	·	4.8 km	MPC · JPL
52262	1983 QV	—	August 30, 1983	Palomar	Gibson, J.	·	6.3 km	MPC · JPL
52263 Rustamov	1985 QD_{6}	Rustamov	August 24, 1985	Nauchnij	N. S. Chernykh	·	3.8 km	MPC · JPL
52264	1985 RD_{2}	—	September 13, 1985	Palomar	E. F. Helin	·	6.4 km	MPC · JPL
52265	1985 RM_{3}	—	September 7, 1985	La Silla	H. Debehogne	·	4.0 km	MPC · JPL
52266 Van Flandern	1986 AD	Van Flandern	January 10, 1986	Palomar	C. S. Shoemaker, E. M. Shoemaker	PHO	3.5 km	MPC · JPL
52267 Rotarytorino	1986 EP_{2}	Rotarytorino	March 4, 1986	La Silla	W. Ferreri	LEO	3.5 km	MPC · JPL
52268	1986 WU	—	November 25, 1986	Kleť	A. Mrkos	·	5.0 km	MPC · JPL
52269	1988 CU	—	February 13, 1988	Yorii	M. Arai, H. Mori	PHO	5.7 km	MPC · JPL
52270 Noamchomsky	1988 CH_{5}	Noamchomsky	February 13, 1988	La Silla	E. W. Elst	V	1.7 km	MPC · JPL
52271 Lecorbusier	1988 RP_{3}	Lecorbusier	September 8, 1988	Tautenburg Observatory	F. Börngen	EUN	4.9 km	MPC · JPL
52272	1988 RO_{5}	—	September 2, 1988	La Silla	H. Debehogne	ADE	10 km	MPC · JPL
52273	1988 RQ_{10}	—	September 14, 1988	Cerro Tololo	S. J. Bus	L5	17 km	MPC · JPL
52274	1988 RG_{12}	—	September 14, 1988	Cerro Tololo	S. J. Bus	·	2.5 km	MPC · JPL
52275	1988 RS_{12}	—	September 14, 1988	Cerro Tololo	S. J. Bus	L5	18 km	MPC · JPL
52276	1988 RZ_{12}	—	September 14, 1988	Cerro Tololo	S. J. Bus	·	5.7 km	MPC · JPL
52277	1988 SE_{3}	—	September 16, 1988	Cerro Tololo	S. J. Bus	EUN	3.6 km	MPC · JPL
52278	1988 SG_{3}	—	September 16, 1988	Cerro Tololo	S. J. Bus	L5	20 km	MPC · JPL
52279	1989 CH_{3}	—	February 4, 1989	La Silla	E. W. Elst	DOR	6.5 km	MPC · JPL
52280	1989 RB	—	September 5, 1989	Palomar	E. F. Helin	·	7.0 km	MPC · JPL
52281	1989 SJ_{1}	—	September 26, 1989	La Silla	E. W. Elst	·	2.7 km	MPC · JPL
52282	1989 SO_{2}	—	September 26, 1989	La Silla	E. W. Elst	·	2.0 km	MPC · JPL
52283	1989 SE_{5}	—	September 26, 1989	La Silla	E. W. Elst	(5)	3.7 km	MPC · JPL
52284	1990 HP	—	April 26, 1990	Palomar	E. F. Helin	H	2.0 km	MPC · JPL
52285 Kakurinji	1990 OX_{2}	Kakurinji	July 30, 1990	Geisei	T. Seki	·	3.2 km	MPC · JPL
52286	1990 QT_{1}	—	August 22, 1990	Palomar	H. E. Holt	·	2.4 km	MPC · JPL
52287	1990 QP_{4}	—	August 23, 1990	Palomar	H. E. Holt	NYS ·	4.6 km	MPC · JPL
52288	1990 QU_{8}	—	August 16, 1990	La Silla	E. W. Elst	THM	7.9 km	MPC · JPL
52289	1990 QH_{9}	—	August 16, 1990	La Silla	E. W. Elst	NYS	3.5 km	MPC · JPL
52290	1990 SF	—	September 17, 1990	Siding Spring	R. H. McNaught	·	8.0 km	MPC · JPL
52291 Mott	1990 TU_{1}	Mott	October 10, 1990	Tautenburg Observatory	F. Börngen, L. D. Schmadel	·	5.0 km	MPC · JPL
52292 Kamdzhalov	1990 TB_{2}	Kamdzhalov	October 10, 1990	Tautenburg Observatory	L. D. Schmadel, F. Börngen	EOS	3.6 km	MPC · JPL
52293 Mommsen	1990 TQ_{3}	Mommsen	October 12, 1990	Tautenburg Observatory	F. Börngen, L. D. Schmadel	·	10 km	MPC · JPL
52294 Detlef	1990 TJ_{4}	Detlef	October 12, 1990	Tautenburg Observatory	L. D. Schmadel, F. Börngen	NYS	2.8 km	MPC · JPL
52295 Köppen	1990 VK_{4}	Köppen	November 15, 1990	La Silla	E. W. Elst	·	2.0 km	MPC · JPL
52296	1990 WM_{3}	—	November 19, 1990	La Silla	E. W. Elst	·	11 km	MPC · JPL
52297	1991 CH_{2}	—	February 12, 1991	Siding Spring	R. H. McNaught	·	4.5 km	MPC · JPL
52298	1991 GM_{7}	—	April 8, 1991	La Silla	E. W. Elst	EUN	3.0 km	MPC · JPL
52299	1991 NJ_{1}	—	July 12, 1991	Palomar	H. E. Holt	·	1.7 km	MPC · JPL
52300	1991 NE_{3}	—	July 4, 1991	La Silla	H. Debehogne	·	4.8 km	MPC · JPL

== 52301–52400 ==
back to top

Designation			Discovery			Properties		Ref
Permanent	Provisional	Named after	Date	Site	Discoverer(s)	Category	Diam.	Ref
52301 Qumran	1991 RQ_{2}	Qumran	September 9, 1991	Tautenburg Observatory	F. Börngen, L. D. Schmadel	·	1.7 km	MPC · JPL
52302	1991 RL_{8}	—	September 12, 1991	Palomar	H. E. Holt	·	2.6 km	MPC · JPL
52303	1991 RU_{9}	—	September 10, 1991	Palomar	H. E. Holt	·	2.7 km	MPC · JPL
52304	1991 RB_{10}	—	September 12, 1991	Palomar	H. E. Holt	·	3.4 km	MPC · JPL
52305	1991 RR_{10}	—	September 10, 1991	Palomar	H. E. Holt	V	2.4 km	MPC · JPL
52306	1991 RF_{20}	—	September 14, 1991	Palomar	H. E. Holt	V	1.8 km	MPC · JPL
52307	1991 TH_{1}	—	October 12, 1991	Palomar	J. Alu	PHO	2.4 km	MPC · JPL
52308 Hanspeterröser	1991 TE_{3}	Hanspeterröser	October 7, 1991	Tautenburg Observatory	L. D. Schmadel, F. Börngen	·	6.0 km	MPC · JPL
52309 Philnicolai	1991 TQ_{7}	Philnicolai	October 7, 1991	Tautenburg Observatory	F. Börngen	·	13 km	MPC · JPL
52310	1991 VJ	—	November 9, 1991	Siding Spring	R. H. McNaught	·	3.8 km	MPC · JPL
52311	1991 VK_{8}	—	November 4, 1991	Kitt Peak	Spacewatch	EOS	4.4 km	MPC · JPL
52312	1991 VG_{9}	—	November 4, 1991	Kitt Peak	Spacewatch	KOR · fast	3.0 km	MPC · JPL
52313	1991 VH_{9}	—	November 4, 1991	Kitt Peak	Spacewatch	·	1.7 km	MPC · JPL
52314	1991 XD	—	December 7, 1991	Palomar	E. F. Helin	H	3.2 km	MPC · JPL
52315	1992 AM	—	January 9, 1992	Palomar	E. F. Helin	PHO	3.3 km	MPC · JPL
52316 Daveslater	1992 BD	Daveslater	January 29, 1992	Kitt Peak	Spacewatch	H · moon	2.1 km	MPC · JPL
52317	1992 BC_{1}	—	January 30, 1992	Palomar	E. F. Helin	·	5.7 km	MPC · JPL
52318	1992 BC_{3}	—	January 26, 1992	Kitt Peak	Spacewatch	·	3.7 km	MPC · JPL
52319	1992 DP_{7}	—	February 29, 1992	La Silla	UESAC	·	2.8 km	MPC · JPL
52320	1992 DX_{7}	—	February 29, 1992	La Silla	UESAC	·	5.8 km	MPC · JPL
52321	1992 DO_{8}	—	February 29, 1992	La Silla	UESAC	·	5.6 km	MPC · JPL
52322	1992 DD_{9}	—	February 29, 1992	La Silla	UESAC	·	3.6 km	MPC · JPL
52323	1992 DP_{9}	—	February 29, 1992	La Silla	UESAC	·	9.6 km	MPC · JPL
52324	1992 DV_{9}	—	February 29, 1992	La Silla	UESAC	·	2.4 km	MPC · JPL
52325	1992 EX_{2}	—	March 6, 1992	Kitt Peak	Spacewatch	·	1.8 km	MPC · JPL
52326	1992 EL_{7}	—	March 1, 1992	La Silla	UESAC	·	8.8 km	MPC · JPL
52327	1992 EK_{9}	—	March 2, 1992	La Silla	UESAC	NYS	2.5 km	MPC · JPL
52328	1992 EK_{11}	—	March 6, 1992	La Silla	UESAC	·	1.9 km	MPC · JPL
52329	1992 ER_{12}	—	March 1, 1992	La Silla	UESAC	NYS ·	4.9 km	MPC · JPL
52330	1992 EA_{15}	—	March 1, 1992	La Silla	UESAC	PHO	3.3 km	MPC · JPL
52331	1992 EC_{15}	—	March 1, 1992	La Silla	UESAC	PHO	2.9 km	MPC · JPL
52332	1992 EZ_{19}	—	March 1, 1992	La Silla	UESAC	PHO	2.6 km	MPC · JPL
52333	1992 EE_{22}	—	March 1, 1992	La Silla	UESAC	NYS	2.0 km	MPC · JPL
52334 Oberammergau	1992 FS_{3}	Oberammergau	March 30, 1992	Tautenburg Observatory	F. Börngen	NYS ·	5.1 km	MPC · JPL
52335	1992 HO	—	April 23, 1992	Kitt Peak	Spacewatch	·	3.0 km	MPC · JPL
52336	1992 OE_{7}	—	July 26, 1992	La Silla	E. W. Elst	·	3.4 km	MPC · JPL
52337 Compton	1992 RS	Compton	September 2, 1992	Tautenburg Observatory	F. Börngen, L. D. Schmadel	·	3.5 km	MPC · JPL
52338	1992 RH_{1}	—	September 2, 1992	Siding Spring	R. H. McNaught	HNS	3.3 km	MPC · JPL
52339	1992 RO_{2}	—	September 2, 1992	La Silla	E. W. Elst	·	3.9 km	MPC · JPL
52340	1992 SY	—	September 27, 1992	Kitt Peak	Spacewatch	APO +1km	910 m	MPC · JPL
52341 Ballmann	1992 SB_{2}	Ballmann	September 21, 1992	Tautenburg Observatory	L. D. Schmadel, F. Börngen	·	5.2 km	MPC · JPL
52342	1992 SK_{19}	—	September 22, 1992	La Silla	E. W. Elst	·	6.1 km	MPC · JPL
52343	1992 WX_{1}	—	November 18, 1992	Kushiro	S. Ueda, H. Kaneda	·	2.4 km	MPC · JPL
52344 Yehudimenuhin	1992 YM_{1}	Yehudimenuhin	December 18, 1992	Caussols	E. W. Elst	·	13 km	MPC · JPL
52345 Tabuchikouichi	1993 FG_{1}	Tabuchikouichi	March 20, 1993	Kitami	K. Endate, K. Watanabe	PHO	8.6 km	MPC · JPL
52346	1993 FG_{8}	—	March 17, 1993	La Silla	UESAC	PHO	6.7 km	MPC · JPL
52347	1993 FL_{9}	—	March 17, 1993	La Silla	UESAC	·	3.2 km	MPC · JPL
52348	1993 FH_{12}	—	March 17, 1993	La Silla	UESAC	NYS	2.9 km	MPC · JPL
52349	1993 FK_{15}	—	March 17, 1993	La Silla	UESAC	·	1.8 km	MPC · JPL
52350	1993 FH_{16}	—	March 17, 1993	La Silla	UESAC	NYS	2.6 km	MPC · JPL
52351	1993 FN_{17}	—	March 17, 1993	La Silla	UESAC	·	5.4 km	MPC · JPL
52352	1993 FU_{18}	—	March 17, 1993	La Silla	UESAC	·	5.0 km	MPC · JPL
52353	1993 FP_{19}	—	March 17, 1993	La Silla	UESAC	·	4.9 km	MPC · JPL
52354	1993 FF_{22}	—	March 21, 1993	La Silla	UESAC	·	3.0 km	MPC · JPL
52355	1993 FD_{24}	—	March 21, 1993	La Silla	UESAC	NYS	2.6 km	MPC · JPL
52356	1993 FP_{25}	—	March 21, 1993	La Silla	UESAC	HYG	6.1 km	MPC · JPL
52357	1993 FK_{26}	—	March 21, 1993	La Silla	UESAC	·	2.3 km	MPC · JPL
52358	1993 FQ_{26}	—	March 21, 1993	La Silla	UESAC	·	2.4 km	MPC · JPL
52359	1993 FM_{27}	—	March 21, 1993	La Silla	UESAC	·	3.1 km	MPC · JPL
52360	1993 FC_{30}	—	March 21, 1993	La Silla	UESAC	·	7.3 km	MPC · JPL
52361	1993 FT_{30}	—	March 21, 1993	La Silla	UESAC	·	1.3 km	MPC · JPL
52362	1993 FS_{31}	—	March 19, 1993	La Silla	UESAC	·	5.3 km	MPC · JPL
52363	1993 FP_{37}	—	March 19, 1993	La Silla	UESAC	THM	6.3 km	MPC · JPL
52364	1993 FG_{38}	—	March 19, 1993	La Silla	UESAC	·	6.7 km	MPC · JPL
52365	1993 FS_{38}	—	March 19, 1993	La Silla	UESAC	·	8.3 km	MPC · JPL
52366	1993 FN_{39}	—	March 19, 1993	La Silla	UESAC	·	9.6 km	MPC · JPL
52367	1993 FO_{39}	—	March 19, 1993	La Silla	UESAC	·	1.6 km	MPC · JPL
52368	1993 FQ_{44}	—	March 21, 1993	La Silla	UESAC	·	6.8 km	MPC · JPL
52369	1993 FH_{46}	—	March 19, 1993	La Silla	UESAC	·	2.8 km	MPC · JPL
52370	1993 FQ_{48}	—	March 19, 1993	La Silla	UESAC	·	2.2 km	MPC · JPL
52371	1993 FV_{49}	—	March 19, 1993	La Silla	UESAC	·	6.7 km	MPC · JPL
52372	1993 FE_{50}	—	March 19, 1993	La Silla	UESAC	·	8.2 km	MPC · JPL
52373	1993 FO_{50}	—	March 19, 1993	La Silla	UESAC	·	1.6 km	MPC · JPL
52374	1993 FS_{50}	—	March 19, 1993	La Silla	UESAC	·	2.7 km	MPC · JPL
52375	1993 FV_{53}	—	March 17, 1993	La Silla	UESAC	·	5.2 km	MPC · JPL
52376	1993 FW_{69}	—	March 21, 1993	La Silla	UESAC	V	1.4 km	MPC · JPL
52377	1993 FH_{78}	—	March 21, 1993	La Silla	UESAC	V	1.5 km	MPC · JPL
52378	1993 FC_{81}	—	March 18, 1993	La Silla	UESAC	·	1.4 km	MPC · JPL
52379	1993 FL_{81}	—	March 18, 1993	La Silla	UESAC	·	3.3 km	MPC · JPL
52380	1993 FG_{83}	—	March 19, 1993	Kitt Peak	Spacewatch	·	1.9 km	MPC · JPL
52381	1993 HA	—	April 17, 1993	Kitt Peak	Spacewatch	AMO	350 m	MPC · JPL
52382 Saitoizumi	1993 HE_{1}	Saitoizumi	April 16, 1993	Kitami	K. Endate, K. Watanabe	·	2.6 km	MPC · JPL
52383	1993 HU_{2}	—	April 19, 1993	Kitt Peak	Spacewatch	·	3.6 km	MPC · JPL
52384 Elenapanko	1993 HZ_{5}	Elenapanko	April 19, 1993	Palomar	C. S. Shoemaker	H	1.9 km	MPC · JPL
52385	1993 OC	—	July 16, 1993	Palomar	E. F. Helin	PHO	3.7 km	MPC · JPL
52386	1993 OF_{6}	—	July 20, 1993	La Silla	E. W. Elst	NYS	4.0 km	MPC · JPL
52387 Huitzilopochtli	1993 OM_{7}	Huitzilopochtli	July 20, 1993	La Silla	E. W. Elst	AMO +1km	890 m	MPC · JPL
52388	1993 PV_{4}	—	August 15, 1993	Caussols	E. W. Elst	·	4.1 km	MPC · JPL
52389	1993 PP_{5}	—	August 15, 1993	Caussols	E. W. Elst	(5)	2.6 km	MPC · JPL
52390	1993 QS_{4}	—	August 18, 1993	Caussols	E. W. Elst	EUN	3.7 km	MPC · JPL
52391	1993 QP_{5}	—	August 17, 1993	Caussols	E. W. Elst	·	4.2 km	MPC · JPL
52392	1993 RG_{5}	—	September 15, 1993	La Silla	E. W. Elst	·	3.9 km	MPC · JPL
52393	1993 RH_{5}	—	September 15, 1993	La Silla	E. W. Elst	·	2.7 km	MPC · JPL
52394	1993 RF_{6}	—	September 15, 1993	La Silla	E. W. Elst	·	5.3 km	MPC · JPL
52395	1993 RJ_{6}	—	September 15, 1993	La Silla	E. W. Elst	·	3.6 km	MPC · JPL
52396	1993 RC_{7}	—	September 15, 1993	La Silla	E. W. Elst	·	2.6 km	MPC · JPL
52397	1993 RF_{7}	—	September 15, 1993	La Silla	E. W. Elst	·	2.9 km	MPC · JPL
52398	1993 RT_{7}	—	September 15, 1993	La Silla	E. W. Elst	(5)	3.8 km	MPC · JPL
52399	1993 RM_{15}	—	September 15, 1993	La Silla	H. Debehogne, E. W. Elst	RAF	2.7 km	MPC · JPL
52400	1993 SG_{14}	—	September 16, 1993	La Silla	H. Debehogne, E. W. Elst	(5)	3.0 km	MPC · JPL

== 52401–52500 ==
back to top

Designation			Discovery			Properties		Ref
Permanent	Provisional	Named after	Date	Site	Discoverer(s)	Category	Diam.	Ref
52401	1993 SS_{15}	—	September 19, 1993	Palomar	H. E. Holt	·	5.0 km	MPC · JPL
52402 Yoichihasegawa	1993 TL	Yoichihasegawa	October 8, 1993	Kitami	K. Endate, K. Watanabe	·	3.0 km	MPC · JPL
52403	1993 TQ_{17}	—	October 9, 1993	La Silla	E. W. Elst	PAD	5.4 km	MPC · JPL
52404	1993 TD_{20}	—	October 9, 1993	La Silla	E. W. Elst	·	2.3 km	MPC · JPL
52405	1993 TV_{22}	—	October 9, 1993	La Silla	E. W. Elst	·	2.8 km	MPC · JPL
52406	1993 TV_{23}	—	October 9, 1993	La Silla	E. W. Elst	·	1.6 km	MPC · JPL
52407	1993 TC_{31}	—	October 9, 1993	La Silla	E. W. Elst	·	2.3 km	MPC · JPL
52408	1993 TJ_{34}	—	October 9, 1993	La Silla	E. W. Elst	·	4.0 km	MPC · JPL
52409	1993 UW_{5}	—	October 20, 1993	La Silla	E. W. Elst	(5)	3.5 km	MPC · JPL
52410	1993 UG_{6}	—	October 20, 1993	La Silla	E. W. Elst	·	4.8 km	MPC · JPL
52411	1994 AA_{3}	—	January 14, 1994	Oizumi	T. Kobayashi	·	4.2 km	MPC · JPL
52412	1994 AF_{5}	—	January 5, 1994	Kitt Peak	Spacewatch	·	5.0 km	MPC · JPL
52413	1994 BF_{4}	—	January 16, 1994	Caussols	E. W. Elst, C. Pollas	·	5.5 km	MPC · JPL
52414	1994 CV_{17}	—	February 8, 1994	La Silla	E. W. Elst	·	5.0 km	MPC · JPL
52415	1994 EP_{6}	—	March 9, 1994	Caussols	E. W. Elst	·	4.8 km	MPC · JPL
52416	1994 GC_{3}	—	April 6, 1994	Kitt Peak	Spacewatch	ANF	3.9 km	MPC · JPL
52417	1994 GG_{4}	—	April 6, 1994	Kitt Peak	Spacewatch	·	5.3 km	MPC · JPL
52418	1994 GX_{10}	—	April 14, 1994	Palomar	PCAS	·	8.2 km	MPC · JPL
52419	1994 HX	—	April 16, 1994	Kitt Peak	Spacewatch	·	1.0 km	MPC · JPL
52420	1994 JX_{1}	—	May 1, 1994	Kitt Peak	Spacewatch	·	5.0 km	MPC · JPL
52421 Daihoji	1994 LA	Daihoji	June 1, 1994	Kuma Kogen	A. Nakamura	·	9.6 km	MPC · JPL
52422 LPL	1994 LP	LPL	June 7, 1994	Kitt Peak	Spacewatch	·	9.9 km	MPC · JPL
52423	1994 LZ	—	June 11, 1994	Palomar	E. F. Helin	PHO	3.1 km	MPC · JPL
52424	1994 LX_{3}	—	June 3, 1994	La Silla	H. Debehogne	·	2.1 km	MPC · JPL
52425	1994 LU_{8}	—	June 8, 1994	La Silla	H. Debehogne, E. W. Elst	·	1.8 km	MPC · JPL
52426 Ritaalessandro	1994 PF	Ritaalessandro	August 5, 1994	San Marcello	A. Boattini, M. Tombelli	·	1.4 km	MPC · JPL
52427	1994 PH	—	August 2, 1994	Nachi-Katsuura	Y. Shimizu, T. Urata	·	3.3 km	MPC · JPL
52428	1994 PE_{4}	—	August 10, 1994	La Silla	E. W. Elst	NYS ·	4.0 km	MPC · JPL
52429	1994 PK_{6}	—	August 10, 1994	La Silla	E. W. Elst	MAS	1.5 km	MPC · JPL
52430	1994 PF_{8}	—	August 10, 1994	La Silla	E. W. Elst	·	1.6 km	MPC · JPL
52431	1994 PS_{10}	—	August 10, 1994	La Silla	E. W. Elst	NYS	4.5 km	MPC · JPL
52432	1994 PG_{11}	—	August 10, 1994	La Silla	E. W. Elst	·	2.4 km	MPC · JPL
52433	1994 PZ_{15}	—	August 10, 1994	La Silla	E. W. Elst	NYS	2.4 km	MPC · JPL
52434	1994 PA_{17}	—	August 10, 1994	La Silla	E. W. Elst	NYS	2.6 km	MPC · JPL
52435	1994 PM_{25}	—	August 12, 1994	La Silla	E. W. Elst	·	3.7 km	MPC · JPL
52436	1994 PM_{26}	—	August 12, 1994	La Silla	E. W. Elst	PHO	2.4 km	MPC · JPL
52437	1994 PY_{27}	—	August 12, 1994	La Silla	E. W. Elst	·	1.7 km	MPC · JPL
52438	1994 PQ_{32}	—	August 12, 1994	La Silla	E. W. Elst	·	3.3 km	MPC · JPL
52439	1994 QL	—	August 16, 1994	Siding Spring	R. H. McNaught	H	2.2 km	MPC · JPL
52440	1994 QN	—	August 26, 1994	Siding Spring	R. H. McNaught	PHO	3.2 km	MPC · JPL
52441	1994 RS_{1}	—	September 1, 1994	Palomar	E. F. Helin	·	2.3 km	MPC · JPL
52442	1994 SF_{10}	—	September 28, 1994	Kitt Peak	Spacewatch	MAS	2.2 km	MPC · JPL
52443 Nakagiri	1994 TW	Nakagiri	October 2, 1994	Kitami	K. Endate, K. Watanabe	EUN	3.2 km	MPC · JPL
52444	1994 TQ_{2}	—	October 2, 1994	Kitami	K. Endate, K. Watanabe	·	2.4 km	MPC · JPL
52445	1994 TG_{5}	—	October 2, 1994	Kitt Peak	Spacewatch	·	2.3 km	MPC · JPL
52446	1994 TR_{5}	—	October 4, 1994	Kitt Peak	Spacewatch	NYS ·	4.2 km	MPC · JPL
52447	1994 TH_{16}	—	October 8, 1994	Palomar	E. F. Helin	PHO	5.8 km	MPC · JPL
52448	1994 UW_{9}	—	October 28, 1994	Kitt Peak	Spacewatch	·	1.8 km	MPC · JPL
52449	1994 VJ	—	November 1, 1994	Oizumi	T. Kobayashi	NYS	3.8 km	MPC · JPL
52450	1994 VL	—	November 1, 1994	Oizumi	T. Kobayashi	·	2.3 km	MPC · JPL
52451	1994 VU	—	November 3, 1994	Oizumi	T. Kobayashi	·	3.5 km	MPC · JPL
52452	1994 VQ_{1}	—	November 3, 1994	Oizumi	T. Kobayashi	·	2.4 km	MPC · JPL
52453	1994 WC	—	November 23, 1994	Oizumi	T. Kobayashi	·	4.2 km	MPC · JPL
52454	1994 WV_{4}	—	November 26, 1994	Kitt Peak	Spacewatch	·	2.9 km	MPC · JPL
52455 Masamika	1995 AD_{1}	Masamika	January 6, 1995	Geisei	T. Seki	·	4.0 km	MPC · JPL
52456	1995 AY_{3}	—	January 2, 1995	Caussols	E. W. Elst	·	5.0 km	MPC · JPL
52457 Enquist	1995 AE_{4}	Enquist	January 2, 1995	Caussols	E. W. Elst	(5)	8.0 km	MPC · JPL
52458	1995 BK_{1}	—	January 26, 1995	Oohira	T. Urata	·	2.9 km	MPC · JPL
52459	1995 DS	—	February 21, 1995	Stroncone	A. Vagnozzi	MAR	2.9 km	MPC · JPL
52460	1995 DA_{3}	—	February 24, 1995	Siding Spring	R. H. McNaught	H	1.4 km	MPC · JPL
52461	1995 DE_{5}	—	February 22, 1995	Kitt Peak	Spacewatch	MIS	5.6 km	MPC · JPL
52462	1995 FQ_{15}	—	March 27, 1995	Kitt Peak	Spacewatch	·	3.1 km	MPC · JPL
52463	1995 GA_{8}	—	April 6, 1995	Kitt Peak	T. J. Balonek	·	3.1 km	MPC · JPL
52464	1995 MC_{2}	—	June 23, 1995	Kitt Peak	Spacewatch	·	9.6 km	MPC · JPL
52465	1995 OF_{3}	—	July 22, 1995	Kitt Peak	Spacewatch	·	5.9 km	MPC · JPL
52466	1995 OF_{4}	—	July 22, 1995	Kitt Peak	Spacewatch	·	5.9 km	MPC · JPL
52467	1995 OS_{10}	—	July 22, 1995	Kitt Peak	Spacewatch	·	8.3 km	MPC · JPL
52468	1995 QB_{1}	—	August 19, 1995	Xinglong	SCAP	·	6.0 km	MPC · JPL
52469	1995 QV_{1}	—	August 20, 1995	Nachi-Katsuura	Y. Shimizu, T. Urata	·	1.9 km	MPC · JPL
52470	1995 ST_{2}	—	September 20, 1995	Kushiro	S. Ueda, H. Kaneda	·	3.8 km	MPC · JPL
52471	1995 SG_{4}	—	September 26, 1995	Catalina Station	T. B. Spahr	PHO	2.4 km	MPC · JPL
52472	1995 SR_{9}	—	September 17, 1995	Kitt Peak	Spacewatch	·	8.7 km	MPC · JPL
52473	1995 SE_{17}	—	September 18, 1995	Kitt Peak	Spacewatch	·	7.1 km	MPC · JPL
52474	1995 SH_{32}	—	September 21, 1995	Kitt Peak	Spacewatch	·	1.9 km	MPC · JPL
52475	1995 SO_{39}	—	September 25, 1995	Kitt Peak	Spacewatch	·	9.7 km	MPC · JPL
52476	1995 SM_{73}	—	September 29, 1995	Kitt Peak	Spacewatch	·	4.1 km	MPC · JPL
52477	1995 SG_{77}	—	September 21, 1995	Kitt Peak	Spacewatch	EOS	4.1 km	MPC · JPL
52478	1995 TO	—	October 12, 1995	Sudbury	D. di Cicco	·	2.0 km	MPC · JPL
52479	1995 TZ	—	October 13, 1995	Chichibu	N. Satō, T. Urata	·	5.0 km	MPC · JPL
52480 Enzomora	1995 UM_{5}	Enzomora	October 20, 1995	Bologna	San Vittore	·	1.6 km	MPC · JPL
52481	1995 UG_{15}	—	October 17, 1995	Kitt Peak	Spacewatch	·	9.0 km	MPC · JPL
52482	1995 UW_{25}	—	October 20, 1995	Kitt Peak	Spacewatch	·	1.7 km	MPC · JPL
52483	1995 VZ_{4}	—	November 14, 1995	Kitt Peak	Spacewatch	·	4.1 km	MPC · JPL
52484	1995 VL_{12}	—	November 15, 1995	Kitt Peak	Spacewatch	·	1.4 km	MPC · JPL
52485	1995 WD	—	November 16, 1995	Oizumi	T. Kobayashi	slow	2.4 km	MPC · JPL
52486	1995 WA_{28}	—	November 19, 1995	Kitt Peak	Spacewatch	·	1.3 km	MPC · JPL
52487 Huazhongkejida	1995 XO_{2}	Huazhongkejida	December 6, 1995	Xinglong	SCAP	·	2.2 km	MPC · JPL
52488	1995 XD_{3}	—	December 14, 1995	Kitt Peak	Spacewatch	·	1.8 km	MPC · JPL
52489	1995 YG_{3}	—	December 26, 1995	Oizumi	T. Kobayashi	·	1.9 km	MPC · JPL
52490	1995 YY_{5}	—	December 16, 1995	Kitt Peak	Spacewatch	·	2.2 km	MPC · JPL
52491	1995 YC_{10}	—	December 18, 1995	Kitt Peak	Spacewatch	·	3.9 km	MPC · JPL
52492	1995 YK_{11}	—	December 18, 1995	Kitt Peak	Spacewatch	NYS	1.9 km	MPC · JPL
52493	1995 YC_{17}	—	December 22, 1995	Kitt Peak	Spacewatch	·	1.9 km	MPC · JPL
52494	1996 AN_{8}	—	January 13, 1996	Kitt Peak	Spacewatch	V	1.6 km	MPC · JPL
52495	1996 AK_{10}	—	January 13, 1996	Kitt Peak	Spacewatch	·	3.7 km	MPC · JPL
52496	1996 AA_{11}	—	January 13, 1996	Kitt Peak	Spacewatch	NYS	2.7 km	MPC · JPL
52497	1996 AA_{14}	—	January 15, 1996	Kitt Peak	Spacewatch	V	2.0 km	MPC · JPL
52498	1996 BG_{8}	—	January 19, 1996	Kitt Peak	Spacewatch	·	2.3 km	MPC · JPL
52499	1996 CL_{1}	—	February 11, 1996	Oizumi	T. Kobayashi	PHO	4.3 km	MPC · JPL
52500 Kanata	1996 DC_{1}	Kanata	February 22, 1996	Oizumi	T. Kobayashi	·	3.5 km	MPC · JPL

== 52501–52600 ==
back to top

Designation			Discovery			Properties		Ref
Permanent	Provisional	Named after	Date	Site	Discoverer(s)	Category	Diam.	Ref
52501	1996 DJ_{2}	—	February 23, 1996	Oizumi	T. Kobayashi	ERI	6.3 km	MPC · JPL
52502	1996 EZ_{4}	—	March 11, 1996	Kitt Peak	Spacewatch	·	3.1 km	MPC · JPL
52503	1996 EX_{15}	—	March 13, 1996	Kitt Peak	Spacewatch	V	1.6 km	MPC · JPL
52504	1996 FQ_{2}	—	March 19, 1996	Haleakala	NEAT	MAS	1.5 km	MPC · JPL
52505	1996 FD_{4}	—	March 22, 1996	Haleakala	AMOS	·	2.8 km	MPC · JPL
52506	1996 FK_{4}	—	March 23, 1996	Haleakala	AMOS	MAS	1.4 km	MPC · JPL
52507	1996 GC_{1}	—	April 12, 1996	Višnjan Observatory	Višnjan	NYS	3.1 km	MPC · JPL
52508	1996 GK_{5}	—	April 11, 1996	Kitt Peak	Spacewatch	NYS ·	4.3 km	MPC · JPL
52509	1996 GP_{9}	—	April 13, 1996	Kitt Peak	Spacewatch	·	2.2 km	MPC · JPL
52510	1996 GA_{11}	—	April 13, 1996	Kitt Peak	Spacewatch	·	3.2 km	MPC · JPL
52511	1996 GH_{12}	—	April 15, 1996	Kitt Peak	Spacewatch	L5	22 km	MPC · JPL
52512	1996 GO_{19}	—	April 15, 1996	La Silla	E. W. Elst	·	3.0 km	MPC · JPL
52513	1996 GZ_{20}	—	April 13, 1996	Kitt Peak	Spacewatch	·	2.5 km	MPC · JPL
52514	1996 HG_{3}	—	April 17, 1996	Kitt Peak	Spacewatch	·	4.3 km	MPC · JPL
52515	1996 HL_{12}	—	April 17, 1996	La Silla	E. W. Elst	MAS	1.8 km	MPC · JPL
52516	1996 HO_{20}	—	April 18, 1996	La Silla	E. W. Elst	NYS · fast	4.0 km	MPC · JPL
52517	1996 HZ_{23}	—	April 20, 1996	La Silla	E. W. Elst	·	4.5 km	MPC · JPL
52518	1996 HE_{25}	—	April 20, 1996	La Silla	E. W. Elst	·	3.0 km	MPC · JPL
52519	1996 JL_{1}	—	May 15, 1996	Haleakala	NEAT	·	3.1 km	MPC · JPL
52520	1996 JK_{3}	—	May 9, 1996	Kitt Peak	Spacewatch	·	6.0 km	MPC · JPL
52521	1996 JU_{3}	—	May 9, 1996	Kitt Peak	Spacewatch	NYS ·	4.8 km	MPC · JPL
52522	1996 JW_{10}	—	May 15, 1996	Kitt Peak	Spacewatch	NYS	3.1 km	MPC · JPL
52523	1996 JE_{16}	—	May 15, 1996	Kitt Peak	Spacewatch	·	5.4 km	MPC · JPL
52524 Pikador	1996 PH	Pikador	August 8, 1996	Kleť	Kleť	·	2.5 km	MPC · JPL
52525	1996 PJ	—	August 8, 1996	Haleakala	AMOS	H	1.7 km	MPC · JPL
52526	1996 PF_{3}	—	August 15, 1996	Haleakala	NEAT	H	1.8 km	MPC · JPL
52527	1996 PM_{5}	—	August 10, 1996	Haleakala	NEAT	·	4.9 km	MPC · JPL
52528	1996 PM_{9}	—	August 8, 1996	La Silla	E. W. Elst	KOR	4.0 km	MPC · JPL
52529	1996 RQ	—	September 7, 1996	Catalina Station	T. B. Spahr	H	2.0 km	MPC · JPL
52530	1996 TW_{3}	—	October 8, 1996	Haleakala	NEAT	·	4.6 km	MPC · JPL
52531	1996 TB_{8}	—	October 12, 1996	Sudbury	D. di Cicco	·	6.7 km	MPC · JPL
52532	1996 TP_{8}	—	October 9, 1996	Haleakala	NEAT	·	6.1 km	MPC · JPL
52533	1996 TJ_{10}	—	October 9, 1996	Kushiro	S. Ueda, H. Kaneda	H	2.6 km	MPC · JPL
52534	1996 TB_{15}	—	October 7, 1996	Haleakala	AMOS	H · slow	2.0 km	MPC · JPL
52535	1996 TU_{19}	—	October 5, 1996	Kitt Peak	Spacewatch	·	6.2 km	MPC · JPL
52536	1996 TB_{20}	—	October 5, 1996	Kitt Peak	Spacewatch	EOS	5.0 km	MPC · JPL
52537	1996 TL_{32}	—	October 9, 1996	Kitt Peak	Spacewatch	HYG · slow	8.1 km	MPC · JPL
52538	1996 TT_{39}	—	October 8, 1996	La Silla	E. W. Elst	·	2.9 km	MPC · JPL
52539	1996 TB_{41}	—	October 8, 1996	La Silla	E. W. Elst	EOS	3.9 km	MPC · JPL
52540	1996 TJ_{48}	—	October 9, 1996	Kushiro	S. Ueda, H. Kaneda	EOS	6.7 km	MPC · JPL
52541	1996 VB	—	November 1, 1996	Prescott	P. G. Comba	KOR	3.2 km	MPC · JPL
52542	1996 VU_{4}	—	November 13, 1996	Oizumi	T. Kobayashi	·	10 km	MPC · JPL
52543	1996 VA_{11}	—	November 4, 1996	Kitt Peak	Spacewatch	VER	7.8 km	MPC · JPL
52544	1996 VC_{11}	—	November 4, 1996	Kitt Peak	Spacewatch	·	11 km	MPC · JPL
52545	1996 VW_{12}	—	November 5, 1996	Kitt Peak	Spacewatch	HYG	6.4 km	MPC · JPL
52546	1996 XW	—	December 1, 1996	Chichibu	N. Satō	EOS	6.2 km	MPC · JPL
52547	1996 XQ_{1}	—	December 2, 1996	Oizumi	T. Kobayashi	·	12 km	MPC · JPL
52548	1996 XD_{2}	—	December 3, 1996	Prescott	P. G. Comba	HYG	6.9 km	MPC · JPL
52549	1996 XB_{31}	—	December 14, 1996	Oizumi	T. Kobayashi	VER	8.1 km	MPC · JPL
52550	1996 YB_{3}	—	December 30, 1996	Chichibu	N. Satō	·	14 km	MPC · JPL
52551	1997 AL	—	January 2, 1997	Oizumi	T. Kobayashi	VER	7.7 km	MPC · JPL
52552	1997 AD_{17}	—	January 14, 1997	Haleakala	NEAT	·	8.1 km	MPC · JPL
52553	1997 CA_{16}	—	February 6, 1997	Kitt Peak	Spacewatch	·	3.6 km	MPC · JPL
52554	1997 EN_{3}	—	March 2, 1997	Kitt Peak	Spacewatch	·	1.8 km	MPC · JPL
52555	1997 EK_{4}	—	March 2, 1997	Kitt Peak	Spacewatch	·	1.7 km	MPC · JPL
52556	1997 ET_{35}	—	March 4, 1997	Socorro	LINEAR	·	8.5 km	MPC · JPL
52557	1997 EK_{41}	—	March 10, 1997	Socorro	LINEAR	·	2.0 km	MPC · JPL
52558 Pigafetta	1997 FR	Pigafetta	March 27, 1997	Colleverde	V. S. Casulli	·	3.6 km	MPC · JPL
52559	1997 FN_{3}	—	March 31, 1997	Socorro	LINEAR	·	7.3 km	MPC · JPL
52560	1997 GL_{14}	—	April 3, 1997	Socorro	LINEAR	·	2.6 km	MPC · JPL
52561	1997 GT_{14}	—	April 3, 1997	Socorro	LINEAR	·	2.5 km	MPC · JPL
52562	1997 GY_{17}	—	April 3, 1997	Socorro	LINEAR	·	2.5 km	MPC · JPL
52563	1997 GY_{18}	—	April 3, 1997	Socorro	LINEAR	·	1.9 km	MPC · JPL
52564	1997 GN_{21}	—	April 6, 1997	Socorro	LINEAR	·	2.3 km	MPC · JPL
52565	1997 GO_{22}	—	April 6, 1997	Socorro	LINEAR	·	2.9 km	MPC · JPL
52566	1997 GP_{27}	—	April 2, 1997	Xinglong	SCAP	·	4.2 km	MPC · JPL
52567	1997 HN_{2}	—	April 28, 1997	Prescott	P. G. Comba	L5	22 km	MPC · JPL
52568	1997 HJ_{8}	—	April 30, 1997	Socorro	LINEAR	NYS	3.3 km	MPC · JPL
52569	1997 HJ_{11}	—	April 30, 1997	Socorro	LINEAR	·	3.8 km	MPC · JPL
52570 Lauraco	1997 JC_{1}	Lauraco	May 1, 1997	Bologna	San Vittore	PHO	2.8 km	MPC · JPL
52571	1997 KJ_{2}	—	May 29, 1997	Kitt Peak	Spacewatch	·	2.8 km	MPC · JPL
52572	1997 LL	—	June 3, 1997	Xinglong	SCAP	·	3.5 km	MPC · JPL
52573	1997 LM_{12}	—	June 7, 1997	La Silla	E. W. Elst	·	3.4 km	MPC · JPL
52574	1997 MS_{2}	—	June 28, 1997	Socorro	LINEAR	EUN	3.6 km	MPC · JPL
52575	1997 MY_{5}	—	June 26, 1997	Kitt Peak	Spacewatch	·	2.8 km	MPC · JPL
52576	1997 MW_{6}	—	June 28, 1997	Kitt Peak	Spacewatch	·	3.6 km	MPC · JPL
52577	1997 MJ_{7}	—	June 27, 1997	Kitt Peak	Spacewatch	ADE	3.9 km	MPC · JPL
52578	1997 NE	—	July 1, 1997	Kitt Peak	Spacewatch	NYS	2.0 km	MPC · JPL
52579	1997 NH	—	July 1, 1997	Kitt Peak	Spacewatch	·	2.2 km	MPC · JPL
52580	1997 NO	—	July 1, 1997	Kitt Peak	Spacewatch	·	3.4 km	MPC · JPL
52581	1997 NB_{1}	—	July 3, 1997	Farra d'Isonzo	Farra d'Isonzo	NYS	4.1 km	MPC · JPL
52582	1997 NE_{6}	—	July 9, 1997	Kitt Peak	Spacewatch	·	2.6 km	MPC · JPL
52583	1997 NY_{6}	—	July 2, 1997	Kitt Peak	Spacewatch	·	3.6 km	MPC · JPL
52584	1997 OV_{1}	—	July 30, 1997	Farra d'Isonzo	Farra d'Isonzo	·	2.5 km	MPC · JPL
52585	1997 ON_{2}	—	July 29, 1997	Bédoin	P. Antonini	·	2.8 km	MPC · JPL
52586	1997 PB	—	August 1, 1997	Haleakala	NEAT	·	3.6 km	MPC · JPL
52587	1997 PD	—	August 1, 1997	Haleakala	NEAT	·	6.1 km	MPC · JPL
52588	1997 PD_{1}	—	August 3, 1997	Xinglong	SCAP	fast	3.3 km	MPC · JPL
52589 Montviloff	1997 PY_{3}	Montviloff	August 12, 1997	Pises	Pises	·	2.4 km	MPC · JPL
52590	1997 PC_{5}	—	August 11, 1997	Xinglong	SCAP	NYS	3.1 km	MPC · JPL
52591	1997 QD	—	August 22, 1997	Kleť	Z. Moravec	·	2.9 km	MPC · JPL
52592	1997 QC_{2}	—	August 27, 1997	Nachi-Katsuura	Y. Shimizu, T. Urata	·	6.5 km	MPC · JPL
52593	1997 QF_{2}	—	August 27, 1997	Nachi-Katsuura	Y. Shimizu, T. Urata	·	5.7 km	MPC · JPL
52594	1997 RF_{3}	—	September 5, 1997	Rand	G. R. Viscome	·	2.9 km	MPC · JPL
52595	1997 RT_{3}	—	September 1, 1997	Caussols	ODAS	·	3.5 km	MPC · JPL
52596	1997 RO_{8}	—	September 4, 1997	Xinglong	SCAP	·	2.3 km	MPC · JPL
52597	1997 RM_{9}	—	September 15, 1997	Ondřejov	L. Kotková	·	3.5 km	MPC · JPL
52598	1997 SR_{3}	—	September 25, 1997	Rand	G. R. Viscome	MIS	4.8 km	MPC · JPL
52599	1997 SK_{4}	—	September 27, 1997	Oizumi	T. Kobayashi	·	3.4 km	MPC · JPL
52600	1997 SP_{10}	—	September 26, 1997	Xinglong	SCAP	·	3.3 km	MPC · JPL

== 52601–52700 ==
back to top

Designation			Discovery			Properties		Ref
Permanent	Provisional	Named after	Date	Site	Discoverer(s)	Category	Diam.	Ref
52601 Iwayaji	1997 SJ_{16}	Iwayaji	September 29, 1997	Kuma Kogen	A. Nakamura	·	2.6 km	MPC · JPL
52602 Floriansignoret	1997 TY_{5}	Floriansignoret	October 2, 1997	Caussols	ODAS	KOR	4.7 km	MPC · JPL
52603	1997 TV_{9}	—	October 5, 1997	Ondřejov	L. Kotková	·	3.8 km	MPC · JPL
52604 Thomayer	1997 TZ_{9}	Thomayer	October 5, 1997	Ondřejov	P. Pravec	(5)	4.0 km	MPC · JPL
52605	1997 TK_{11}	—	October 3, 1997	Kitt Peak	Spacewatch	EUN	3.1 km	MPC · JPL
52606	1997 TM_{13}	—	October 3, 1997	Kitt Peak	Spacewatch	·	2.5 km	MPC · JPL
52607	1997 TX_{16}	—	October 7, 1997	Rand	G. R. Viscome	·	3.4 km	MPC · JPL
52608	1997 TM_{19}	—	October 10, 1997	Ondřejov	L. Kotková	EUN	2.1 km	MPC · JPL
52609	1997 TK_{24}	—	October 5, 1997	Xinglong	SCAP	·	3.0 km	MPC · JPL
52610	1997 UK_{1}	—	October 23, 1997	Prescott	P. G. Comba	·	3.6 km	MPC · JPL
52611	1997 UL_{3}	—	October 26, 1997	Oizumi	T. Kobayashi	EUN	3.8 km	MPC · JPL
52612	1997 UH_{5}	—	October 27, 1997	Prescott	P. G. Comba	EUN	4.0 km	MPC · JPL
52613	1997 UK_{10}	—	October 29, 1997	Haleakala	NEAT	·	5.3 km	MPC · JPL
52614	1997 UP_{10}	—	October 29, 1997	Woomera	F. B. Zoltowski	·	2.8 km	MPC · JPL
52615	1997 UY_{12}	—	October 23, 1997	Kitt Peak	Spacewatch	KOR	2.3 km	MPC · JPL
52616	1997 UB_{20}	—	October 25, 1997	Kitt Peak	Spacewatch	·	3.3 km	MPC · JPL
52617	1997 VH_{1}	—	November 1, 1997	Oohira	T. Urata	·	3.5 km	MPC · JPL
52618	1997 VP_{2}	—	November 4, 1997	Woomera	F. B. Zoltowski	·	6.0 km	MPC · JPL
52619	1997 VR_{2}	—	November 1, 1997	Xinglong	SCAP	·	3.3 km	MPC · JPL
52620	1997 VQ_{3}	—	November 6, 1997	Oizumi	T. Kobayashi	·	3.8 km	MPC · JPL
52621	1997 VW_{4}	—	November 4, 1997	Nachi-Katsuura	Y. Shimizu, T. Urata	EUN	5.7 km	MPC · JPL
52622	1997 VT_{5}	—	November 8, 1997	Oizumi	T. Kobayashi	·	5.0 km	MPC · JPL
52623	1997 VY_{6}	—	November 6, 1997	Chichibu	N. Satō	·	4.7 km	MPC · JPL
52624	1997 VW_{8}	—	November 2, 1997	Črni Vrh	Mikuž, H.	·	6.1 km	MPC · JPL
52625	1997 WD	—	November 18, 1997	Oizumi	T. Kobayashi	MAR	3.0 km	MPC · JPL
52626	1997 WL_{1}	—	November 19, 1997	Xinglong	SCAP	·	6.6 km	MPC · JPL
52627	1997 WU_{2}	—	November 23, 1997	Oizumi	T. Kobayashi	slow	13 km	MPC · JPL
52628	1997 WO_{3}	—	November 16, 1997	Xinglong	SCAP	·	5.1 km	MPC · JPL
52629	1997 WA_{8}	—	November 23, 1997	Chichibu	N. Satō	·	5.6 km	MPC · JPL
52630	1997 WL_{8}	—	November 20, 1997	Kitt Peak	Spacewatch	AGN	3.9 km	MPC · JPL
52631	1997 WC_{21}	—	November 20, 1997	Dynic	A. Sugie	·	3.4 km	MPC · JPL
52632	1997 WN_{21}	—	November 30, 1997	Oizumi	T. Kobayashi	slow	9.9 km	MPC · JPL
52633 Turvey	1997 WL_{23}	Turvey	November 30, 1997	Stakenbridge Obs.	B. G. W. Manning	·	4.9 km	MPC · JPL
52634	1997 WR_{28}	—	November 24, 1997	Kushiro	S. Ueda, H. Kaneda	·	8.4 km	MPC · JPL
52635	1997 WC_{32}	—	November 29, 1997	Socorro	LINEAR	PAD	5.0 km	MPC · JPL
52636	1997 WO_{34}	—	November 29, 1997	Socorro	LINEAR	HNS	3.3 km	MPC · JPL
52637	1997 WH_{35}	—	November 29, 1997	Socorro	LINEAR	HOF	6.3 km	MPC · JPL
52638	1997 WD_{36}	—	November 29, 1997	Socorro	LINEAR	KOR	4.7 km	MPC · JPL
52639	1997 WF_{45}	—	November 29, 1997	Socorro	LINEAR	GEF	4.2 km	MPC · JPL
52640	1997 WJ_{46}	—	November 26, 1997	Socorro	LINEAR	·	3.1 km	MPC · JPL
52641	1997 WZ_{54}	—	November 29, 1997	Socorro	LINEAR	·	3.8 km	MPC · JPL
52642	1997 WB_{55}	—	November 29, 1997	Socorro	LINEAR	·	3.3 km	MPC · JPL
52643	1997 XK	—	December 3, 1997	Oizumi	T. Kobayashi	·	3.5 km	MPC · JPL
52644	1997 XR_{10}	—	December 8, 1997	Xinglong	SCAP	·	5.1 km	MPC · JPL
52645	1997 XR_{13}	—	December 2, 1997	La Silla	Uppsala-DLR Trojan Survey	L4	13 km	MPC · JPL
52646	1997 YC	—	December 18, 1997	Oizumi	T. Kobayashi	·	6.4 km	MPC · JPL
52647	1997 YD_{4}	—	December 23, 1997	Xinglong	SCAP	·	5.9 km	MPC · JPL
52648	1997 YN_{5}	—	December 25, 1997	Oizumi	T. Kobayashi	EOS	5.7 km	MPC · JPL
52649 Chrismith	1997 YX_{11}	Chrismith	December 27, 1997	Goodricke-Pigott	R. A. Tucker	EOS	5.7 km	MPC · JPL
52650	1997 YF_{15}	—	December 28, 1997	Kitt Peak	Spacewatch	·	5.0 km	MPC · JPL
52651	1997 YF_{18}	—	December 27, 1997	Xinglong	SCAP	·	13 km	MPC · JPL
52652	1997 YV_{18}	—	December 31, 1997	Kitt Peak	Spacewatch	·	11 km	MPC · JPL
52653	1998 AJ_{3}	—	January 3, 1998	Xinglong	SCAP	·	7.8 km	MPC · JPL
52654	1998 AK_{5}	—	January 8, 1998	Caussols	ODAS	EOS	6.7 km	MPC · JPL
52655 Villermaux	1998 AF_{6}	Villermaux	January 8, 1998	Caussols	ODAS	·	3.0 km	MPC · JPL
52656	1998 AN_{6}	—	January 4, 1998	Xinglong	SCAP	VER	7.0 km	MPC · JPL
52657	1998 AK_{7}	—	January 5, 1998	Oizumi	T. Kobayashi	·	14 km	MPC · JPL
52658	1998 BJ_{6}	—	January 22, 1998	Kitt Peak	Spacewatch	·	8.6 km	MPC · JPL
52659	1998 BQ_{6}	—	January 19, 1998	Uenohara	N. Kawasato	·	3.7 km	MPC · JPL
52660	1998 BJ_{8}	—	January 25, 1998	Oizumi	T. Kobayashi	·	7.7 km	MPC · JPL
52661	1998 BT_{8}	—	January 25, 1998	Oizumi	T. Kobayashi	·	12 km	MPC · JPL
52662	1998 BW_{12}	—	January 23, 1998	Socorro	LINEAR	·	6.0 km	MPC · JPL
52663	1998 BV_{18}	—	January 23, 1998	Kitt Peak	Spacewatch	·	4.9 km	MPC · JPL
52664	1998 BA_{21}	—	January 22, 1998	Kitt Peak	Spacewatch	KOR	3.1 km	MPC · JPL
52665 Brianmay	1998 BM_{30}	Brianmay	January 30, 1998	Kleť	J. Tichá, M. Tichý	·	4.5 km	MPC · JPL
52666	1998 BL_{33}	—	January 31, 1998	Oizumi	T. Kobayashi	·	12 km	MPC · JPL
52667	1998 CT_{1}	—	February 1, 1998	Burlington	Handley, T.	·	5.9 km	MPC · JPL
52668	1998 CA_{5}	—	February 6, 1998	La Silla	E. W. Elst	·	10 km	MPC · JPL
52669	1998 DO_{2}	—	February 20, 1998	Caussols	ODAS	·	9.7 km	MPC · JPL
52670 Alby	1998 DC_{3}	Alby	February 20, 1998	Bologna	San Vittore	·	4.1 km	MPC · JPL
52671	1998 DL_{4}	—	February 22, 1998	Haleakala	NEAT	·	6.8 km	MPC · JPL
52672	1998 DH_{5}	—	February 22, 1998	Haleakala	NEAT	slow	9.5 km	MPC · JPL
52673	1998 DW_{5}	—	February 22, 1998	Haleakala	NEAT	·	9.2 km	MPC · JPL
52674	1998 DZ_{8}	—	February 23, 1998	Kitt Peak	Spacewatch	HYG	7.3 km	MPC · JPL
52675	1998 DJ_{9}	—	February 22, 1998	Haleakala	NEAT	·	11 km	MPC · JPL
52676	1998 DF_{16}	—	February 26, 1998	Haleakala	NEAT	URS	10 km	MPC · JPL
52677	1998 DY_{20}	—	February 22, 1998	Kitt Peak	Spacewatch	·	14 km	MPC · JPL
52678	1998 DC_{21}	—	February 22, 1998	Kitt Peak	Spacewatch	EOS	6.3 km	MPC · JPL
52679	1998 DZ_{22}	—	February 24, 1998	Kitt Peak	Spacewatch	EOS	4.8 km	MPC · JPL
52680	1998 DX_{29}	—	February 21, 1998	Kitt Peak	Spacewatch	THM	7.2 km	MPC · JPL
52681 Kelleghan	1998 DK_{34}	Kelleghan	February 27, 1998	La Silla	E. W. Elst	·	7.5 km	MPC · JPL
52682	1998 DM_{34}	—	February 27, 1998	La Silla	E. W. Elst	VER	6.5 km	MPC · JPL
52683	1998 DF_{35}	—	February 27, 1998	La Silla	E. W. Elst	·	2.0 km	MPC · JPL
52684	1998 EQ_{8}	—	March 2, 1998	Xinglong	SCAP	AGN	4.3 km	MPC · JPL
52685	1998 EZ_{9}	—	March 11, 1998	Xinglong	SCAP	LIX	8.7 km	MPC · JPL
52686	1998 EN_{11}	—	March 1, 1998	La Silla	E. W. Elst	EUP	9.2 km	MPC · JPL
52687	1998 EO_{13}	—	March 1, 1998	La Silla	E. W. Elst	·	8.0 km	MPC · JPL
52688	1998 FL_{1}	—	March 21, 1998	Lime Creek	R. Linderholm	EOS	6.0 km	MPC · JPL
52689	1998 FF_{2}	—	March 20, 1998	Socorro	LINEAR	AMO	530 m	MPC · JPL
52690	1998 FO_{2}	—	March 20, 1998	Socorro	LINEAR	H	1.3 km	MPC · JPL
52691 Maryrobinettek	1998 FC_{6}	Maryrobinettek	March 18, 1998	Kitt Peak	Spacewatch	THM	4.5 km	MPC · JPL
52692 Johnscalzi	1998 FO_{8}	Johnscalzi	March 21, 1998	Kitt Peak	Spacewatch	·	11 km	MPC · JPL
52693	1998 FH_{13}	—	March 26, 1998	Haleakala	NEAT	·	7.8 km	MPC · JPL
52694	1998 FL_{28}	—	March 20, 1998	Socorro	LINEAR	·	4.2 km	MPC · JPL
52695	1998 FG_{32}	—	March 20, 1998	Socorro	LINEAR	URS	9.6 km	MPC · JPL
52696	1998 FC_{51}	—	March 20, 1998	Socorro	LINEAR	THM	4.7 km	MPC · JPL
52697	1998 FJ_{51}	—	March 20, 1998	Socorro	LINEAR	·	7.8 km	MPC · JPL
52698	1998 FK_{54}	—	March 20, 1998	Socorro	LINEAR	·	5.9 km	MPC · JPL
52699	1998 FO_{56}	—	March 20, 1998	Socorro	LINEAR	·	6.5 km	MPC · JPL
52700	1998 FG_{62}	—	March 20, 1998	Socorro	LINEAR	(11097) · CYB	7.0 km	MPC · JPL

== 52701–52800 ==
back to top

Designation			Discovery			Properties		Ref
Permanent	Provisional	Named after	Date	Site	Discoverer(s)	Category	Diam.	Ref
52701	1998 FL_{69}	—	March 20, 1998	Socorro	LINEAR	THM	7.0 km	MPC · JPL
52702	1998 FR_{71}	—	March 20, 1998	Socorro	LINEAR	3:2	10 km	MPC · JPL
52703 Bernardleblanc	1998 FW_{72}	Bernardleblanc	March 26, 1998	Caussols	ODAS	THM	6.3 km	MPC · JPL
52704	1998 FX_{74}	—	March 24, 1998	Socorro	LINEAR	·	14 km	MPC · JPL
52705	1998 FA_{77}	—	March 24, 1998	Socorro	LINEAR	·	11 km	MPC · JPL
52706	1998 FO_{77}	—	March 24, 1998	Socorro	LINEAR	CYB	14 km	MPC · JPL
52707	1998 FE_{81}	—	March 24, 1998	Socorro	LINEAR	HYG	8.8 km	MPC · JPL
52708	1998 FS_{82}	—	March 24, 1998	Socorro	LINEAR	·	6.1 km	MPC · JPL
52709	1998 FA_{84}	—	March 24, 1998	Socorro	LINEAR	EOS	4.8 km	MPC · JPL
52710	1998 FS_{90}	—	March 24, 1998	Socorro	LINEAR	·	3.3 km	MPC · JPL
52711	1998 FE_{104}	—	March 31, 1998	Socorro	LINEAR	EOS	7.0 km	MPC · JPL
52712	1998 FK_{107}	—	March 31, 1998	Socorro	LINEAR	EOS	6.6 km	MPC · JPL
52713	1998 FQ_{113}	—	March 31, 1998	Socorro	LINEAR	·	6.9 km	MPC · JPL
52714	1998 FP_{115}	—	March 31, 1998	Socorro	LINEAR	·	5.3 km	MPC · JPL
52715	1998 FR_{116}	—	March 31, 1998	Socorro	LINEAR	·	6.4 km	MPC · JPL
52716	1998 FT_{120}	—	March 20, 1998	Socorro	LINEAR	·	4.5 km	MPC · JPL
52717	1998 FV_{121}	—	March 20, 1998	Socorro	LINEAR	·	6.4 km	MPC · JPL
52718	1998 FL_{126}	—	March 27, 1998	Reedy Creek	J. Broughton	·	6.2 km	MPC · JPL
52719	1998 FV_{130}	—	March 22, 1998	Socorro	LINEAR	HYG	6.1 km	MPC · JPL
52720	1998 FY_{147}	—	March 26, 1998	Haleakala	NEAT	·	8.5 km	MPC · JPL
52721	1998 FH_{148}	—	March 29, 1998	Socorro	LINEAR	THM	4.7 km	MPC · JPL
52722	1998 GK	—	April 2, 1998	Socorro	LINEAR	H	2.5 km	MPC · JPL
52723	1998 GP_{2}	—	April 2, 1998	Socorro	LINEAR	·	13 km	MPC · JPL
52724	1998 GC_{4}	—	April 2, 1998	Socorro	LINEAR	·	8.5 km	MPC · JPL
52725	1998 GF_{5}	—	April 2, 1998	Socorro	LINEAR	·	9.8 km	MPC · JPL
52726	1998 GY_{6}	—	April 2, 1998	Socorro	LINEAR	·	8.0 km	MPC · JPL
52727	1998 GG_{9}	—	April 2, 1998	Socorro	LINEAR	·	6.0 km	MPC · JPL
52728	1998 GW_{9}	—	April 2, 1998	Socorro	LINEAR	·	7.2 km	MPC · JPL
52729	1998 GZ_{9}	—	April 2, 1998	Socorro	LINEAR	·	8.5 km	MPC · JPL
52730	1998 HN_{4}	—	April 22, 1998	Kitt Peak	Spacewatch	·	1.6 km	MPC · JPL
52731	1998 HU_{12}	—	April 23, 1998	Haleakala	NEAT	·	8.2 km	MPC · JPL
52732	1998 HT_{15}	—	April 22, 1998	Kitt Peak	Spacewatch	·	8.1 km	MPC · JPL
52733	1998 HP_{21}	—	April 20, 1998	Socorro	LINEAR	·	5.5 km	MPC · JPL
52734	1998 HV_{32}	—	April 20, 1998	Socorro	LINEAR	·	7.6 km	MPC · JPL
52735	1998 HR_{33}	—	April 20, 1998	Socorro	LINEAR	HYG	6.5 km	MPC · JPL
52736	1998 HA_{61}	—	April 21, 1998	Socorro	LINEAR	·	7.6 km	MPC · JPL
52737	1998 HS_{83}	—	April 21, 1998	Socorro	LINEAR	·	6.7 km	MPC · JPL
52738	1998 HW_{108}	—	April 23, 1998	Socorro	LINEAR	·	7.1 km	MPC · JPL
52739	1998 HP_{109}	—	April 23, 1998	Socorro	LINEAR	·	9.6 km	MPC · JPL
52740	1998 HB_{113}	—	April 23, 1998	Socorro	LINEAR	·	8.0 km	MPC · JPL
52741	1998 HW_{116}	—	April 23, 1998	Socorro	LINEAR	·	8.0 km	MPC · JPL
52742	1998 HV_{126}	—	April 18, 1998	Socorro	LINEAR	·	6.5 km	MPC · JPL
52743	1998 HW_{135}	—	April 20, 1998	Socorro	LINEAR	EOS	9.6 km	MPC · JPL
52744	1998 HO_{136}	—	April 20, 1998	Socorro	LINEAR	EOS	6.5 km	MPC · JPL
52745	1998 HL_{137}	—	April 20, 1998	Socorro	LINEAR	·	8.6 km	MPC · JPL
52746	1998 HS_{149}	—	April 25, 1998	La Silla	E. W. Elst	·	2.1 km	MPC · JPL
52747	1998 HM_{151}	—	April 29, 1998	Mauna Kea	Mauna Kea	cubewano (cold)	100 km	MPC · JPL
52748	1998 JJ_{1}	—	May 1, 1998	Haleakala	NEAT	H	1.9 km	MPC · JPL
52749	1998 KN_{8}	—	May 23, 1998	Anderson Mesa	LONEOS	·	11 km	MPC · JPL
52750	1998 KK_{17}	—	May 29, 1998	Socorro	LINEAR	APO +1km	1.1 km	MPC · JPL
52751	1998 KR_{37}	—	May 22, 1998	Socorro	LINEAR	·	12 km	MPC · JPL
52752	1998 KH_{48}	—	May 22, 1998	Socorro	LINEAR	·	1.7 km	MPC · JPL
52753	1998 KG_{56}	—	May 27, 1998	Socorro	LINEAR	H	1.8 km	MPC · JPL
52754	1998 KN_{62}	—	May 22, 1998	Socorro	LINEAR	·	12 km	MPC · JPL
52755	1998 MU	—	June 16, 1998	Socorro	LINEAR	·	9.0 km	MPC · JPL
52756	1998 MY_{3}	—	June 18, 1998	Kitt Peak	Spacewatch	·	1.6 km	MPC · JPL
52757	1998 MH_{4}	—	June 23, 1998	Anderson Mesa	LONEOS	PHO	2.9 km	MPC · JPL
52758	1998 MN_{8}	—	June 19, 1998	Socorro	LINEAR	·	1.7 km	MPC · JPL
52759	1998 MW_{13}	—	June 25, 1998	Woomera	F. B. Zoltowski	·	4.5 km	MPC · JPL
52760	1998 ML_{14}	—	June 24, 1998	Socorro	LINEAR	APO +1km · PHA	1.0 km	MPC · JPL
52761	1998 MN_{14}	—	June 25, 1998	Socorro	LINEAR	AMO +1km	910 m	MPC · JPL
52762	1998 MT_{24}	—	June 29, 1998	Socorro	LINEAR	APO +1km	6.7 km	MPC · JPL
52763	1998 ME_{29}	—	June 24, 1998	Socorro	LINEAR	·	1.9 km	MPC · JPL
52764	1998 MC_{33}	—	June 24, 1998	Socorro	LINEAR	·	2.2 km	MPC · JPL
52765	1998 MA_{36}	—	June 24, 1998	Socorro	LINEAR	·	3.8 km	MPC · JPL
52766	1998 MC_{38}	—	June 18, 1998	Anderson Mesa	LONEOS	·	2.3 km	MPC · JPL
52767 Ophelestes	1998 MW_{41}	Ophelestes	June 28, 1998	La Silla	E. W. Elst	L5	25 km	MPC · JPL
52768	1998 OR_{2}	—	July 24, 1998	Haleakala	NEAT	AMO · APO +1km · PHA	1.8 km	MPC · JPL
52769	1998 OF_{4}	—	July 26, 1998	Prescott	P. G. Comba	·	1.7 km	MPC · JPL
52770	1998 OD_{15}	—	July 26, 1998	La Silla	E. W. Elst	·	2.0 km	MPC · JPL
52771	1998 PX	—	August 14, 1998	Woomera	F. B. Zoltowski	·	1.8 km	MPC · JPL
52772	1998 PT_{1}	—	August 14, 1998	Anderson Mesa	LONEOS	·	1.8 km	MPC · JPL
52773	1998 QU_{12}	—	August 17, 1998	Socorro	LINEAR	·	2.1 km	MPC · JPL
52774	1998 QC_{14}	—	August 17, 1998	Socorro	LINEAR	·	2.0 km	MPC · JPL
52775	1998 QQ_{18}	—	August 17, 1998	Socorro	LINEAR	·	1.8 km	MPC · JPL
52776	1998 QS_{19}	—	August 17, 1998	Socorro	LINEAR	·	1.9 km	MPC · JPL
52777	1998 QR_{21}	—	August 17, 1998	Socorro	LINEAR	·	2.2 km	MPC · JPL
52778	1998 QV_{24}	—	August 17, 1998	Socorro	LINEAR	·	2.2 km	MPC · JPL
52779	1998 QZ_{29}	—	August 26, 1998	Xinglong	SCAP	V	1.5 km	MPC · JPL
52780	1998 QK_{31}	—	August 17, 1998	Socorro	LINEAR	V	2.3 km	MPC · JPL
52781	1998 QY_{37}	—	August 17, 1998	Socorro	LINEAR	·	2.6 km	MPC · JPL
52782	1998 QA_{38}	—	August 17, 1998	Socorro	LINEAR	NYS	2.0 km	MPC · JPL
52783	1998 QB_{38}	—	August 17, 1998	Socorro	LINEAR	EUN	2.9 km	MPC · JPL
52784	1998 QL_{38}	—	August 17, 1998	Socorro	LINEAR	·	2.2 km	MPC · JPL
52785	1998 QN_{38}	—	August 17, 1998	Socorro	LINEAR	·	1.8 km	MPC · JPL
52786	1998 QP_{42}	—	August 17, 1998	Socorro	LINEAR	slow	2.2 km	MPC · JPL
52787	1998 QJ_{43}	—	August 17, 1998	Socorro	LINEAR	·	1.8 km	MPC · JPL
52788	1998 QA_{46}	—	August 17, 1998	Socorro	LINEAR	·	2.2 km	MPC · JPL
52789	1998 QH_{47}	—	August 17, 1998	Socorro	LINEAR	V	1.4 km	MPC · JPL
52790	1998 QD_{48}	—	August 17, 1998	Socorro	LINEAR	·	3.4 km	MPC · JPL
52791	1998 QC_{49}	—	August 17, 1998	Socorro	LINEAR	·	1.7 km	MPC · JPL
52792	1998 QY_{50}	—	August 17, 1998	Socorro	LINEAR	V	1.5 km	MPC · JPL
52793	1998 QN_{51}	—	August 17, 1998	Socorro	LINEAR	·	2.6 km	MPC · JPL
52794	1998 QS_{51}	—	August 17, 1998	Socorro	LINEAR	·	2.1 km	MPC · JPL
52795	1998 QZ_{51}	—	August 17, 1998	Socorro	LINEAR	·	3.0 km	MPC · JPL
52796	1998 QA_{52}	—	August 17, 1998	Socorro	LINEAR	·	2.2 km	MPC · JPL
52797	1998 QS_{54}	—	August 27, 1998	Anderson Mesa	LONEOS	·	2.1 km	MPC · JPL
52798	1998 QO_{55}	—	August 26, 1998	Caussols	ODAS	NYS	3.4 km	MPC · JPL
52799	1998 QF_{56}	—	August 28, 1998	Socorro	LINEAR	·	3.7 km	MPC · JPL
52800	1998 QT_{60}	—	August 29, 1998	Socorro	LINEAR	slow	8.3 km	MPC · JPL

== 52801–52900 ==
back to top

Designation			Discovery			Properties		Ref
Permanent	Provisional	Named after	Date	Site	Discoverer(s)	Category	Diam.	Ref
52801	1998 QG_{63}	—	August 24, 1998	Reedy Creek	J. Broughton	·	2.0 km	MPC · JPL
52802	1998 QP_{67}	—	August 24, 1998	Socorro	LINEAR	·	2.3 km	MPC · JPL
52803	1998 QO_{71}	—	August 24, 1998	Socorro	LINEAR	·	2.2 km	MPC · JPL
52804	1998 QT_{72}	—	August 24, 1998	Socorro	LINEAR	V	1.5 km	MPC · JPL
52805	1998 QT_{76}	—	August 24, 1998	Socorro	LINEAR	·	3.2 km	MPC · JPL
52806	1998 QE_{79}	—	August 24, 1998	Socorro	LINEAR	·	3.2 km	MPC · JPL
52807	1998 QZ_{84}	—	August 24, 1998	Socorro	LINEAR	·	1.9 km	MPC · JPL
52808	1998 QE_{86}	—	August 24, 1998	Socorro	LINEAR	·	2.9 km	MPC · JPL
52809	1998 QQ_{91}	—	August 28, 1998	Socorro	LINEAR	·	3.6 km	MPC · JPL
52810	1998 QS_{91}	—	August 28, 1998	Socorro	LINEAR	·	3.2 km	MPC · JPL
52811	1998 QJ_{92}	—	August 28, 1998	Socorro	LINEAR	·	2.5 km	MPC · JPL
52812	1998 QR_{92}	—	August 28, 1998	Socorro	LINEAR	·	4.5 km	MPC · JPL
52813	1998 QT_{94}	—	August 17, 1998	Socorro	LINEAR	·	1.9 km	MPC · JPL
52814	1998 QE_{98}	—	August 28, 1998	Socorro	LINEAR	·	2.8 km	MPC · JPL
52815	1998 QP_{98}	—	August 28, 1998	Socorro	LINEAR	·	3.3 km	MPC · JPL
52816	1998 QX_{98}	—	August 26, 1998	La Silla	E. W. Elst	NYS	2.0 km	MPC · JPL
52817	1998 QF_{99}	—	August 26, 1998	La Silla	E. W. Elst	·	2.2 km	MPC · JPL
52818	1998 QH_{103}	—	August 26, 1998	La Silla	E. W. Elst	·	2.7 km	MPC · JPL
52819	1998 QK_{104}	—	August 26, 1998	La Silla	E. W. Elst	·	2.8 km	MPC · JPL
52820	1998 RS_{2}	—	September 14, 1998	Socorro	LINEAR	fast	4.0 km	MPC · JPL
52821	1998 RU_{4}	—	September 14, 1998	Socorro	LINEAR	·	1.9 km	MPC · JPL
52822	1998 RN_{6}	—	September 15, 1998	Anderson Mesa	LONEOS	·	2.0 km	MPC · JPL
52823	1998 RA_{7}	—	September 12, 1998	Kitt Peak	Spacewatch	·	2.2 km	MPC · JPL
52824	1998 RN_{16}	—	September 14, 1998	Socorro	LINEAR	·	2.0 km	MPC · JPL
52825	1998 RM_{28}	—	September 14, 1998	Socorro	LINEAR	·	1.8 km	MPC · JPL
52826	1998 RK_{34}	—	September 14, 1998	Socorro	LINEAR	·	4.2 km	MPC · JPL
52827	1998 RY_{38}	—	September 14, 1998	Socorro	LINEAR	NYS	2.0 km	MPC · JPL
52828	1998 RP_{39}	—	September 14, 1998	Socorro	LINEAR	·	1.9 km	MPC · JPL
52829	1998 RP_{43}	—	September 14, 1998	Socorro	LINEAR	·	2.0 km	MPC · JPL
52830	1998 RN_{46}	—	September 14, 1998	Socorro	LINEAR	ERI	3.2 km	MPC · JPL
52831	1998 RA_{47}	—	September 14, 1998	Socorro	LINEAR	·	1.7 km	MPC · JPL
52832	1998 RD_{49}	—	September 14, 1998	Socorro	LINEAR	·	2.0 km	MPC · JPL
52833	1998 RK_{51}	—	September 14, 1998	Socorro	LINEAR	(2076)	2.0 km	MPC · JPL
52834	1998 RV_{53}	—	September 14, 1998	Socorro	LINEAR	·	2.0 km	MPC · JPL
52835	1998 RN_{54}	—	September 14, 1998	Socorro	LINEAR	·	2.6 km	MPC · JPL
52836	1998 RK_{55}	—	September 14, 1998	Socorro	LINEAR	·	2.1 km	MPC · JPL
52837	1998 RL_{55}	—	September 14, 1998	Socorro	LINEAR	·	2.0 km	MPC · JPL
52838	1998 RW_{55}	—	September 14, 1998	Socorro	LINEAR	·	2.4 km	MPC · JPL
52839	1998 RZ_{55}	—	September 14, 1998	Socorro	LINEAR	fast	3.7 km	MPC · JPL
52840	1998 RF_{56}	—	September 14, 1998	Socorro	LINEAR	·	2.0 km	MPC · JPL
52841	1998 RR_{59}	—	September 14, 1998	Socorro	LINEAR	·	2.2 km	MPC · JPL
52842	1998 RV_{59}	—	September 14, 1998	Socorro	LINEAR	·	1.8 km	MPC · JPL
52843	1998 RX_{62}	—	September 14, 1998	Socorro	LINEAR	·	2.5 km	MPC · JPL
52844	1998 RB_{66}	—	September 14, 1998	Socorro	LINEAR	·	3.7 km	MPC · JPL
52845	1998 RH_{67}	—	September 14, 1998	Socorro	LINEAR	·	2.5 km	MPC · JPL
52846	1998 RL_{67}	—	September 14, 1998	Socorro	LINEAR	·	1.6 km	MPC · JPL
52847	1998 RU_{67}	—	September 14, 1998	Socorro	LINEAR	·	1.9 km	MPC · JPL
52848	1998 RY_{71}	—	September 14, 1998	Socorro	LINEAR	·	2.4 km	MPC · JPL
52849	1998 RU_{72}	—	September 14, 1998	Socorro	LINEAR	·	1.8 km	MPC · JPL
52850	1998 RG_{73}	—	September 14, 1998	Socorro	LINEAR	NYS	1.8 km	MPC · JPL
52851	1998 RR_{74}	—	September 14, 1998	Socorro	LINEAR	·	1.9 km	MPC · JPL
52852	1998 RB_{75}	—	September 14, 1998	Socorro	LINEAR	·	2.5 km	MPC · JPL
52853	1998 RG_{76}	—	September 14, 1998	Socorro	LINEAR	·	2.0 km	MPC · JPL
52854	1998 RR_{76}	—	September 14, 1998	Socorro	LINEAR	NYS	2.4 km	MPC · JPL
52855	1998 RW_{76}	—	September 14, 1998	Socorro	LINEAR	·	2.6 km	MPC · JPL
52856	1998 RD_{77}	—	September 14, 1998	Socorro	LINEAR	·	2.7 km	MPC · JPL
52857	1998 RT_{78}	—	September 14, 1998	Socorro	LINEAR	V	1.6 km	MPC · JPL
52858	1998 RF_{79}	—	September 14, 1998	Socorro	LINEAR	·	2.7 km	MPC · JPL
52859	1998 RG_{79}	—	September 14, 1998	Socorro	LINEAR	·	2.1 km	MPC · JPL
52860 Méganediet	1998 SX	Méganediet	September 16, 1998	Caussols	ODAS	·	1.8 km	MPC · JPL
52861	1998 SG_{4}	—	September 18, 1998	Socorro	LINEAR	·	1.7 km	MPC · JPL
52862	1998 SR_{4}	—	September 19, 1998	Stroncone	V. S. Casulli	·	2.9 km	MPC · JPL
52863	1998 SJ_{13}	—	September 21, 1998	Caussols	ODAS	·	2.0 km	MPC · JPL
52864	1998 SR_{21}	—	September 21, 1998	Kitt Peak	Spacewatch	V	2.3 km	MPC · JPL
52865	1998 SH_{22}	—	September 23, 1998	Višnjan Observatory	Višnjan	·	2.2 km	MPC · JPL
52866	1998 ST_{23}	—	September 17, 1998	Anderson Mesa	LONEOS	·	2.9 km	MPC · JPL
52867	1998 SD_{25}	—	September 19, 1998	Anderson Mesa	LONEOS	·	3.3 km	MPC · JPL
52868	1998 SJ_{25}	—	September 22, 1998	Anderson Mesa	LONEOS	·	2.5 km	MPC · JPL
52869	1998 SZ_{25}	—	September 22, 1998	Anderson Mesa	LONEOS	BAP	3.4 km	MPC · JPL
52870	1998 SC_{26}	—	September 22, 1998	Anderson Mesa	LONEOS	ERI	5.5 km	MPC · JPL
52871	1998 SR_{27}	—	September 25, 1998	Catalina	CSS	PHO	2.3 km	MPC · JPL
52872 Okyrhoe	1998 SG_{35}	Okyrhoe	September 19, 1998	Kitt Peak	Spacewatch	T_{j} (2.94) · centaur	36 km	MPC · JPL
52873 Grootaerd	1998 SP_{35}	Grootaerd	September 22, 1998	Caussols	ODAS	V	1.3 km	MPC · JPL
52874	1998 SD_{36}	—	September 26, 1998	Socorro	LINEAR	·	1.9 km	MPC · JPL
52875	1998 SB_{43}	—	September 20, 1998	Xinglong	SCAP	·	2.2 km	MPC · JPL
52876	1998 SQ_{43}	—	September 25, 1998	Xinglong	SCAP	·	2.8 km	MPC · JPL
52877	1998 SU_{43}	—	September 25, 1998	Xinglong	SCAP	NYS	2.1 km	MPC · JPL
52878	1998 SU_{45}	—	September 25, 1998	Kitt Peak	Spacewatch	·	2.2 km	MPC · JPL
52879	1998 SL_{50}	—	September 25, 1998	Kitt Peak	Spacewatch	·	2.1 km	MPC · JPL
52880	1998 SW_{52}	—	September 30, 1998	Kitt Peak	Spacewatch	·	1.6 km	MPC · JPL
52881	1998 SN_{53}	—	September 16, 1998	Anderson Mesa	LONEOS	·	2.0 km	MPC · JPL
52882	1998 ST_{53}	—	September 16, 1998	Anderson Mesa	LONEOS	·	6.3 km	MPC · JPL
52883	1998 SO_{54}	—	September 16, 1998	Anderson Mesa	LONEOS	·	2.5 km	MPC · JPL
52884	1998 SX_{54}	—	September 16, 1998	Anderson Mesa	LONEOS	·	1.8 km	MPC · JPL
52885	1998 SB_{56}	—	September 16, 1998	Anderson Mesa	LONEOS	·	2.5 km	MPC · JPL
52886	1998 SF_{56}	—	September 16, 1998	Anderson Mesa	LONEOS	·	2.5 km	MPC · JPL
52887	1998 SL_{58}	—	September 17, 1998	Anderson Mesa	LONEOS	·	2.1 km	MPC · JPL
52888	1998 SZ_{58}	—	September 17, 1998	Anderson Mesa	LONEOS	(5)	2.5 km	MPC · JPL
52889	1998 SH_{61}	—	September 17, 1998	Anderson Mesa	LONEOS	V	2.5 km	MPC · JPL
52890	1998 SL_{61}	—	September 17, 1998	Anderson Mesa	LONEOS	·	2.8 km	MPC · JPL
52891	1998 SM_{61}	—	September 17, 1998	Anderson Mesa	LONEOS	·	4.7 km	MPC · JPL
52892	1998 SR_{62}	—	September 20, 1998	Xinglong	SCAP	·	3.3 km	MPC · JPL
52893	1998 SD_{63}	—	September 25, 1998	Xinglong	SCAP	·	2.7 km	MPC · JPL
52894	1998 SL_{64}	—	September 20, 1998	La Silla	E. W. Elst	·	3.2 km	MPC · JPL
52895	1998 SE_{65}	—	September 20, 1998	La Silla	E. W. Elst	·	1.8 km	MPC · JPL
52896	1998 SC_{66}	—	September 20, 1998	La Silla	E. W. Elst	NYS	2.9 km	MPC · JPL
52897	1998 SE_{66}	—	September 20, 1998	La Silla	E. W. Elst	·	7.1 km	MPC · JPL
52898	1998 SO_{67}	—	September 20, 1998	La Silla	E. W. Elst	·	1.8 km	MPC · JPL
52899	1998 ST_{67}	—	September 20, 1998	La Silla	E. W. Elst	·	2.1 km	MPC · JPL
52900	1998 SO_{70}	—	September 21, 1998	La Silla	E. W. Elst	·	1.7 km	MPC · JPL

== 52901–53000 ==
back to top

Designation			Discovery			Properties		Ref
Permanent	Provisional	Named after	Date	Site	Discoverer(s)	Category	Diam.	Ref
52901	1998 SK_{73}	—	September 21, 1998	La Silla	E. W. Elst	·	2.2 km	MPC · JPL
52902	1998 SN_{73}	—	September 21, 1998	La Silla	E. W. Elst	·	2.0 km	MPC · JPL
52903	1998 SG_{74}	—	September 21, 1998	La Silla	E. W. Elst	·	3.1 km	MPC · JPL
52904	1998 ST_{74}	—	September 21, 1998	La Silla	E. W. Elst	·	2.4 km	MPC · JPL
52905	1998 SN_{75}	—	September 21, 1998	La Silla	E. W. Elst	·	1.7 km	MPC · JPL
52906	1998 SW_{81}	—	September 26, 1998	Socorro	LINEAR	fast	1.6 km	MPC · JPL
52907	1998 ST_{82}	—	September 26, 1998	Socorro	LINEAR	·	2.3 km	MPC · JPL
52908	1998 SH_{83}	—	September 26, 1998	Socorro	LINEAR	·	2.3 km	MPC · JPL
52909	1998 SZ_{86}	—	September 26, 1998	Socorro	LINEAR	EOS	4.9 km	MPC · JPL
52910	1998 SY_{91}	—	September 26, 1998	Socorro	LINEAR	·	1.7 km	MPC · JPL
52911	1998 SP_{97}	—	September 26, 1998	Socorro	LINEAR	V	1.8 km	MPC · JPL
52912	1998 SN_{100}	—	September 26, 1998	Socorro	LINEAR	·	1.9 km	MPC · JPL
52913	1998 SO_{101}	—	September 26, 1998	Socorro	LINEAR	·	1.6 km	MPC · JPL
52914	1998 SE_{102}	—	September 26, 1998	Socorro	LINEAR	·	2.1 km	MPC · JPL
52915	1998 SC_{103}	—	September 26, 1998	Socorro	LINEAR	·	1.9 km	MPC · JPL
52916	1998 SG_{105}	—	September 26, 1998	Socorro	LINEAR	·	2.5 km	MPC · JPL
52917	1998 SH_{105}	—	September 26, 1998	Socorro	LINEAR	·	2.5 km	MPC · JPL
52918	1998 SM_{106}	—	September 26, 1998	Socorro	LINEAR	·	2.4 km	MPC · JPL
52919	1998 SS_{108}	—	September 26, 1998	Socorro	LINEAR	·	4.0 km	MPC · JPL
52920	1998 SQ_{110}	—	September 26, 1998	Socorro	LINEAR	·	2.1 km	MPC · JPL
52921	1998 SF_{113}	—	September 26, 1998	Socorro	LINEAR	·	1.7 km	MPC · JPL
52922	1998 SS_{113}	—	September 26, 1998	Socorro	LINEAR	ERI	3.5 km	MPC · JPL
52923	1998 SR_{114}	—	September 26, 1998	Socorro	LINEAR	·	2.0 km	MPC · JPL
52924	1998 SF_{117}	—	September 26, 1998	Socorro	LINEAR	·	1.8 km	MPC · JPL
52925	1998 SW_{117}	—	September 26, 1998	Socorro	LINEAR	·	2.7 km	MPC · JPL
52926	1998 SY_{117}	—	September 26, 1998	Socorro	LINEAR	·	1.8 km	MPC · JPL
52927	1998 SC_{122}	—	September 26, 1998	Socorro	LINEAR	·	2.8 km	MPC · JPL
52928	1998 SX_{122}	—	September 26, 1998	Socorro	LINEAR	NYS	2.3 km	MPC · JPL
52929	1998 SY_{122}	—	September 26, 1998	Socorro	LINEAR	V	1.7 km	MPC · JPL
52930	1998 SK_{127}	—	September 26, 1998	Socorro	LINEAR	·	3.1 km	MPC · JPL
52931	1998 SN_{127}	—	September 26, 1998	Socorro	LINEAR	·	2.2 km	MPC · JPL
52932	1998 SQ_{129}	—	September 26, 1998	Socorro	LINEAR	·	3.7 km	MPC · JPL
52933	1998 SC_{130}	—	September 26, 1998	Socorro	LINEAR	·	2.1 km	MPC · JPL
52934	1998 SZ_{131}	—	September 26, 1998	Socorro	LINEAR	·	2.7 km	MPC · JPL
52935	1998 SF_{132}	—	September 26, 1998	Socorro	LINEAR	V	1.0 km	MPC · JPL
52936	1998 SC_{134}	—	September 26, 1998	Socorro	LINEAR	NYS	1.7 km	MPC · JPL
52937	1998 ST_{135}	—	September 26, 1998	Socorro	LINEAR	V	1.7 km	MPC · JPL
52938	1998 SW_{136}	—	September 26, 1998	Socorro	LINEAR	V	1.7 km	MPC · JPL
52939	1998 SO_{137}	—	September 26, 1998	Socorro	LINEAR	·	1.4 km	MPC · JPL
52940	1998 SV_{137}	—	September 26, 1998	Socorro	LINEAR	·	1.9 km	MPC · JPL
52941	1998 SC_{139}	—	September 26, 1998	Socorro	LINEAR	·	3.1 km	MPC · JPL
52942	1998 SU_{139}	—	September 26, 1998	Socorro	LINEAR	·	2.5 km	MPC · JPL
52943	1998 SV_{139}	—	September 26, 1998	Socorro	LINEAR	·	1.6 km	MPC · JPL
52944	1998 SO_{142}	—	September 26, 1998	Socorro	LINEAR	V	1.5 km	MPC · JPL
52945	1998 SQ_{142}	—	September 26, 1998	Socorro	LINEAR	·	1.9 km	MPC · JPL
52946	1998 SZ_{142}	—	September 26, 1998	Socorro	LINEAR	·	2.3 km	MPC · JPL
52947	1998 SY_{144}	—	September 20, 1998	La Silla	E. W. Elst	·	2.5 km	MPC · JPL
52948	1998 SH_{145}	—	September 20, 1998	La Silla	E. W. Elst	NYS	2.5 km	MPC · JPL
52949	1998 SK_{145}	—	September 20, 1998	La Silla	E. W. Elst	NYS	2.8 km	MPC · JPL
52950	1998 SB_{146}	—	September 20, 1998	La Silla	E. W. Elst	·	2.0 km	MPC · JPL
52951	1998 SO_{147}	—	September 20, 1998	La Silla	E. W. Elst	·	3.6 km	MPC · JPL
52952	1998 SU_{154}	—	September 26, 1998	Socorro	LINEAR	(5)	3.1 km	MPC · JPL
52953	1998 SH_{170}	—	September 21, 1998	Anderson Mesa	LONEOS	V	1.3 km	MPC · JPL
52954	1998 TD	—	October 9, 1998	Oizumi	T. Kobayashi	·	2.7 km	MPC · JPL
52955	1998 TJ	—	October 10, 1998	Oizumi	T. Kobayashi	·	2.3 km	MPC · JPL
52956	1998 TZ	—	October 12, 1998	Kitt Peak	Spacewatch	·	1.3 km	MPC · JPL
52957	1998 TW_{1}	—	October 14, 1998	Višnjan Observatory	K. Korlević	·	4.2 km	MPC · JPL
52958	1998 TT_{2}	—	October 13, 1998	Caussols	ODAS	NYS	1.8 km	MPC · JPL
52959 Danieladepaulis	1998 TY_{2}	Danieladepaulis	October 13, 1998	Caussols	ODAS	NYS ·	3.7 km	MPC · JPL
52960	1998 TD_{7}	—	October 14, 1998	Caussols	ODAS	·	1.4 km	MPC · JPL
52961	1998 TH_{9}	—	October 12, 1998	Kitt Peak	Spacewatch	·	1.8 km	MPC · JPL
52962	1998 TS_{13}	—	October 13, 1998	Kitt Peak	Spacewatch	NYS	2.7 km	MPC · JPL
52963 Vercingetorix	1998 TB_{16}	Vercingetorix	October 15, 1998	Caussols	ODAS	·	4.5 km	MPC · JPL
52964	1998 TE_{16}	—	October 15, 1998	Caussols	ODAS	·	2.5 km	MPC · JPL
52965 Laurencebentz	1998 TK_{17}	Laurencebentz	October 15, 1998	Caussols	ODAS	·	1.7 km	MPC · JPL
52966	1998 TQ_{17}	—	October 15, 1998	Višnjan Observatory	K. Korlević	V	1.3 km	MPC · JPL
52967	1998 TV_{26}	—	October 14, 1998	Kitt Peak	Spacewatch	·	3.3 km	MPC · JPL
52968	1998 TL_{28}	—	October 15, 1998	Kitt Peak	Spacewatch	·	1.4 km	MPC · JPL
52969	1998 TG_{30}	—	October 10, 1998	Anderson Mesa	LONEOS	·	2.0 km	MPC · JPL
52970	1998 TS_{30}	—	October 10, 1998	Anderson Mesa	LONEOS	MAR	3.6 km	MPC · JPL
52971	1998 TQ_{31}	—	October 11, 1998	Anderson Mesa	LONEOS	·	2.8 km	MPC · JPL
52972	1998 TH_{33}	—	October 14, 1998	Anderson Mesa	LONEOS	·	2.3 km	MPC · JPL
52973	1998 TP_{33}	—	October 14, 1998	Anderson Mesa	LONEOS	V	2.5 km	MPC · JPL
52974	1998 TE_{34}	—	October 14, 1998	Anderson Mesa	LONEOS	·	2.1 km	MPC · JPL
52975 Cyllarus	1998 TF_{35}	Cyllarus	October 12, 1998	Kitt Peak	Danzl, N.	centaur	62 km	MPC · JPL
52976	1998 UX_{2}	—	October 20, 1998	Caussols	ODAS	·	2.6 km	MPC · JPL
52977	1998 UE_{4}	—	October 21, 1998	Višnjan Observatory	K. Korlević	·	6.6 km	MPC · JPL
52978	1998 UH_{7}	—	October 20, 1998	Višnjan Observatory	K. Korlević	·	3.3 km	MPC · JPL
52979	1998 UL_{7}	—	October 22, 1998	Višnjan Observatory	K. Korlević	·	3.7 km	MPC · JPL
52980	1998 UP_{7}	—	October 22, 1998	Višnjan Observatory	K. Korlević	V	1.8 km	MPC · JPL
52981	1998 UX_{15}	—	October 24, 1998	Višnjan Observatory	K. Korlević	·	2.4 km	MPC · JPL
52982 Marieclaire	1998 UY_{15}	Marieclaire	October 21, 1998	Caussols	ODAS	·	4.2 km	MPC · JPL
52983	1998 UX_{16}	—	October 27, 1998	Catalina	CSS	·	3.8 km	MPC · JPL
52984	1998 UZ_{16}	—	October 27, 1998	Catalina	CSS	PHO	2.3 km	MPC · JPL
52985	1998 UV_{19}	—	October 23, 1998	Višnjan Observatory	K. Korlević	·	2.1 km	MPC · JPL
52986	1998 UE_{21}	—	October 29, 1998	Višnjan Observatory	K. Korlević	·	2.6 km	MPC · JPL
52987	1998 UK_{21}	—	October 28, 1998	Socorro	LINEAR	(2076)	2.5 km	MPC · JPL
52988	1998 UN_{22}	—	October 28, 1998	Socorro	LINEAR	·	1.7 km	MPC · JPL
52989	1998 UT_{23}	—	October 17, 1998	Anderson Mesa	LONEOS	·	3.4 km	MPC · JPL
52990	1998 UP_{24}	—	October 18, 1998	Anderson Mesa	LONEOS	·	3.3 km	MPC · JPL
52991	1998 UM_{25}	—	October 18, 1998	La Silla	E. W. Elst	V	1.6 km	MPC · JPL
52992	1998 UB_{26}	—	October 18, 1998	La Silla	E. W. Elst	V	3.0 km	MPC · JPL
52993	1998 UT_{26}	—	October 18, 1998	La Silla	E. W. Elst	·	2.2 km	MPC · JPL
52994	1998 UY_{29}	—	October 18, 1998	La Silla	E. W. Elst	·	1.8 km	MPC · JPL
52995	1998 UJ_{32}	—	October 27, 1998	Xinglong	SCAP	·	3.1 km	MPC · JPL
52996	1998 UL_{32}	—	October 29, 1998	Xinglong	SCAP	·	3.0 km	MPC · JPL
52997	1998 UY_{32}	—	October 28, 1998	Socorro	LINEAR	·	2.5 km	MPC · JPL
52998	1998 UM_{33}	—	October 28, 1998	Socorro	LINEAR	·	2.9 km	MPC · JPL
52999	1998 UQ_{34}	—	October 28, 1998	Socorro	LINEAR	·	2.0 km	MPC · JPL
53000	1998 UO_{40}	—	October 28, 1998	Socorro	LINEAR	V	2.4 km	MPC · JPL

back to top

== See also ==
- Meanings of minor-planet names: 52001–53000
