= 320 Katharina =

Main-belt asteroid

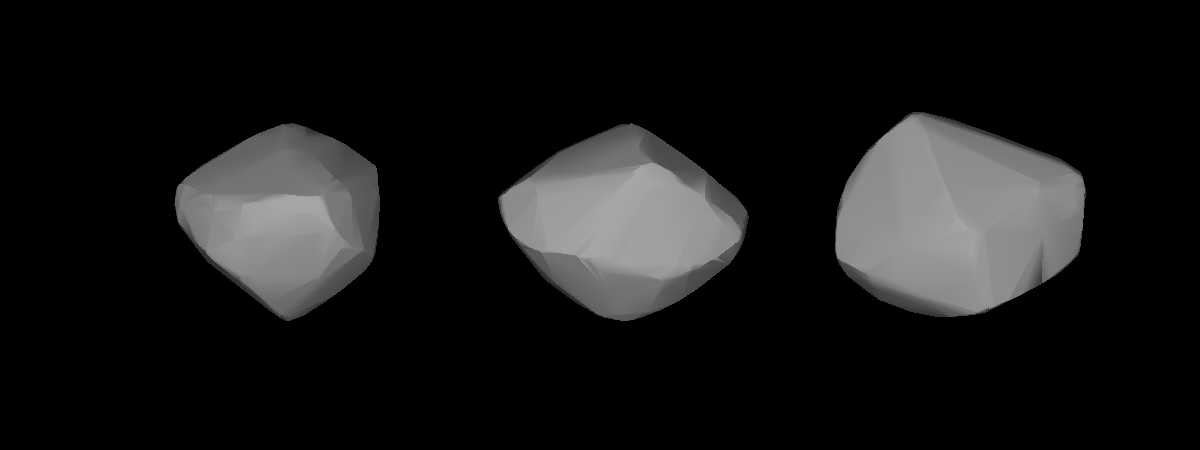
- Lightcurve-based 3D model of 320 Katharina

Discovery
- Discovered by: Johann Palisa
- Discovery date: 11 October 1891

Designations
- Named after: Katharina Pohl
- Minor planet category: Main belt (Eos)

Orbital characteristics
- Epoch 31 July 2016 (JD 2457600.5)
- Uncertainty parameter 0
- Observation arc: 108.42 yr (39602 d)
- Aphelion: 3.36300 AU (503.098 Gm)
- Perihelion: 2.6595 AU (397.86 Gm)
- Semi-major axis: 3.01122 AU (450.472 Gm)
- Eccentricity: 0.11682
- Orbital period (sidereal): 5.23 yr (1908.6 d)
- Mean anomaly: 315.691°
- Mean motion: 0° 11^{m} 19.036^{s} / day
- Inclination: 9.3783°
- Longitude of ascending node: 219.929°
- Argument of perihelion: 150.129°

Physical characteristics
- Dimensions: 17 - 37 km
- Synodic rotation period: 6.893 h (0.2872 d)
- Geometric albedo: 0.3207-0.0677
- Absolute magnitude (H): 10.8

320 Katharina is a small Main belt asteroid orbiting in the Eos family of asteroids, including 513 Centesima and 221 Eos. It was discovered by Johann Palisa on 11 October 1891 in Vienna. It is named after the discoverer's mother.
