= Maria family =

Asteroid family

The Maria family (adj. Marian; FIN: 506; also known as the Roma family) is a collisional asteroid family located in the inner parts of the intermediate asteroid belt, near the 1:3 Kirkwood gap. The family consist of several thousand stony S-type asteroids. It is named after its parent body and lowest numbered member, the asteroid 170 Maria. It is also known as the Roma family, named after its alternative parent body, 472 Roma.

The family was initially identified by Japanese astronomer Kiyotsugu Hirayama in 1918. Asteroids in this family typically have a semi-major axis between 2.52−2.62 AU, and an inclination of 12 to 17°.

== Members ==
The family consists of 2940 known members based on the HCM method. Its largest members are the asteroids 170 Maria and 472 Roma. A complete synthetic HCM-listing for all members can be obtained by using the Ferret Interactive Search.

Parent bodies
Name	a	e	i	SBDB
170 Maria	2.553	0.065	14.40°	JPL
472 Roma	2.545	0.094	15.80°	JPL

Other large, low numbered members
Name	a	e	i	SBDB
292 Ludovica	2.529	0.034	14.92°	JPL
652 Jubilatrix	2.554	0.127	15.77°	JPL
714 Ulula	2.535	0.058	14.27°	JPL
787 Moskva	2.539	0.129	14.84°	JPL
875 Nymphe	2.552	0.151	14.59°	JPL
879 Ricarda	2.531	0.155	13.68°	JPL
897 Lysistrata	2.541	0.094	14.32°	JPL
1158 Luda	2.564	0.112	14.85°	JPL
1215 Boyer	2.578	0.133	15.91°	JPL
2089 Cetacea	2.533	0.156	15.39°	JPL
3066 McFadden	2.527	0.133	15.57°	JPL

== Interlopers ==
Although asteroid 695 Bella has orbital properties that make it a candidate for this family, the spectral properties of the object indicate it is most likely an interloper. Instead, it may have been spalled off from 6 Hebe, or its parent body.
