= 239 Adrastea =

Main-belt asteroid

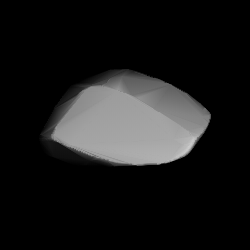
- 3D model based on lightcurve data

Discovery
- Discovered by: Johann Palisa
- Discovery date: 18 August 1884

Designations
- Pronunciation: /ædrəˈstiːə/
- Named after: Adrasteia
- Alternative designations: A884 QA, 1915 TD; 1955 MK_{1}, 1956 UJ
- Minor planet category: Main belt

Orbital characteristics
- Epoch 31 July 2016 (JD 2457600.5)
- Uncertainty parameter 0
- Observation arc: 131.66 yr (48,087 d)
- Aphelion: 3.66279 AU (547.946 Gm)
- Perihelion: 2.2695 AU (339.51 Gm)
- Semi-major axis: 2.96616 AU (443.731 Gm)
- Eccentricity: 0.23486
- Orbital period (sidereal): 5.11 yr (1,865.9 d)
- Average orbital speed: 17.25 km/s
- Mean anomaly: 233.617°
- Mean motion: 0° 11^{m} 34.584^{s} / day
- Inclination: 6.1746°
- Longitude of ascending node: 180.634°
- Argument of perihelion: 210.15°

Physical characteristics
- Dimensions: 41.52±1.4 km
- Synodic rotation period: 18.4707 h (0.76961 d)
- Geometric albedo: 0.0777±0.006
- Temperature: unknown
- Spectral type: unknown
- Absolute magnitude (H): 10.4

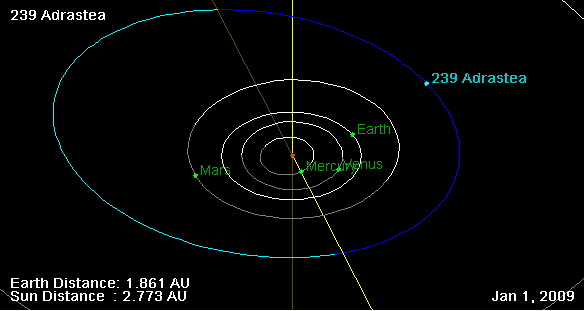
Orbit of Adrastea (blue ring)

239 Adrastea is a main belt asteroid. It was discovered by Johann Palisa on 18 August 1884 in Vienna, and was named after the Greek nymph Adrasteia. This asteroid is orbiting the Sun at a distance of 2.97 AU with a period of 5.11 years and an eccentricity (ovalness) of 0.23. The orbital plane is tilted at an angle of 6.17° to the plane of the ecliptic.

Photometric data collected during 2009 were used for light curve analysis of this asteroid, yielding a rotation period of 18.48±0.03 h with a brightness variation of 0.45±0.05 in magnitude. The result is close to the 18.347±0.003 h period from a study performed in 2003. The asteroid is roughly 42 km in diameter.
