= 286 Iclea =

Main-belt asteroid

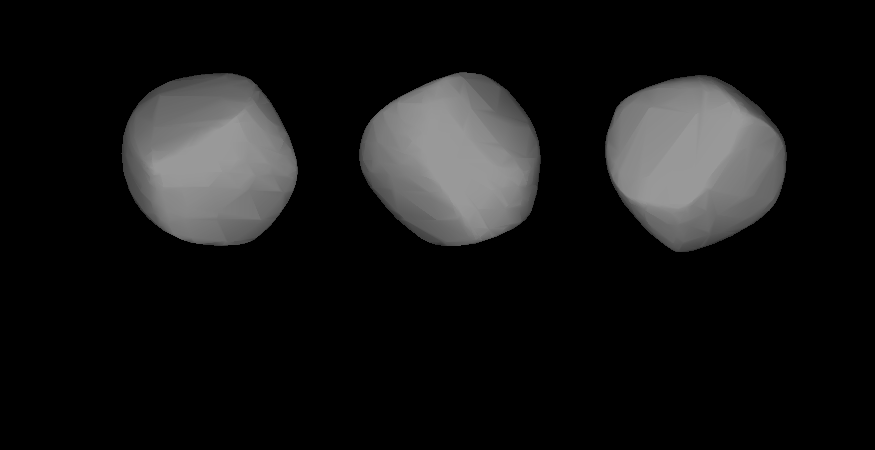
- Lightcurve-based 3D model of 286 Iclea

Discovery
- Discovered by: Johann Palisa
- Discovery date: 3 August 1889

Designations
- Pronunciation: French: [ikle.a]
- Named after: Icléa
- Alternative designations: A889 PB
- Minor planet category: Main belt

Orbital characteristics
- Epoch 31 July 2016 (JD 2457600.5)
- Uncertainty parameter 0
- Observation arc: 117.95 yr (43,083 d)
- Aphelion: 3.287 AU (491.8 Gm)
- Perihelion: 3.102 AU (464.1 Gm)
- Semi-major axis: 3.195 AU (477.9 Gm)
- Eccentricity: 0.028921
- Orbital period (sidereal): 5.71 yr (2,085.8 d)
- Mean anomaly: 49.3850°
- Mean motion: 0° 10^{m} 21.335^{s} / day
- Inclination: 17.9010°
- Longitude of ascending node: 149.115°
- Argument of perihelion: 213.463°

Physical characteristics
- Mean diameter: 86+13 −7 km
- Mass: (5.4±2.1)×10^{17} kg (Note: Calculated from its standard gravitational parameter GM = 0.036±0.014 km^{3}/s^{2}.)
- Mean density: 1.62+0.97 −0.74 g/cm^{3} (calculated)
- Synodic rotation period: 15.36120±0.00004 h
- Pole ecliptic longitude: 31° ± 5°
- Pole ecliptic latitude: 13° ± 4°
- Geometric albedo: 0.0508±0.003
- Absolute magnitude (H): 9.0

286 Iclea is a large main-belt asteroid. It was discovered by Austrian astronomer Johann Palisa on 3 August 1889 in Vienna, and named for the heroine of Camille Flammarion's astronomical romance Uranie. This object is orbiting the Sun at a distance of 3.19 AU with a period of 5.711 years and an orbital eccentricity (ovalness) of 0.029. The orbital plane is tilted at an angle of 17.9° to the plane of the ecliptic.

This asteroid has a classification of CX in the Tholen taxonomy, indicating a generally carbonaceous composition. Infrared measurements indicate a cross-sectional diameter of approximately 94.3 km. Photometric observations of this asteroid in 2001 provided a light curve that was used to derive a synodic rotation period of 15.365±0.002 hours with an amplitude of 0.15 magnitude.
