= 235 Carolina =

Main-belt asteroid

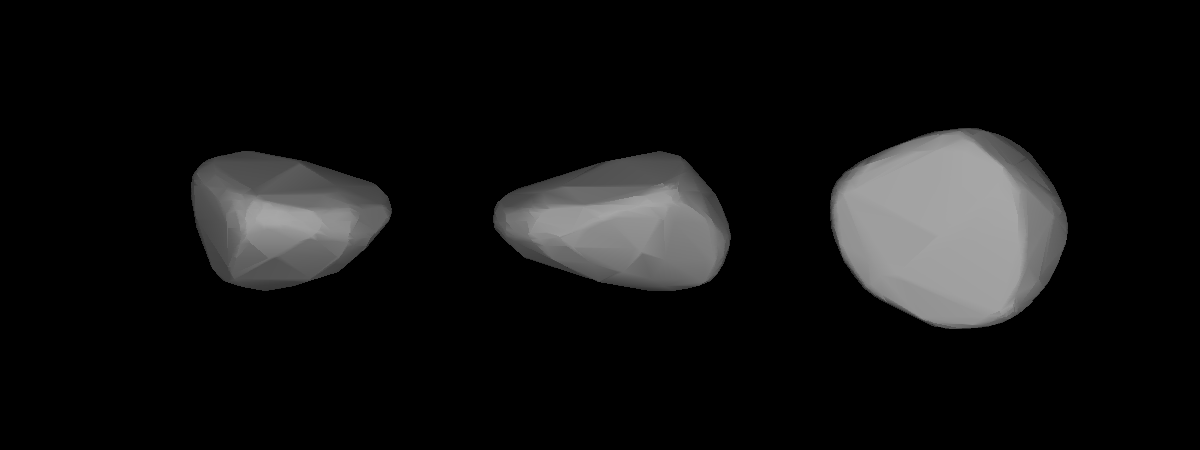
- Lightcurve-based 3D model of 235 Carolina

Discovery
- Discovered by: Johann Palisa
- Discovery date: 28 November 1883

Designations
- Pronunciation: /kærəˈlaɪnə/
- Named after: Caroline Island
- Alternative designations: A883 WA, 1909 GJ; 1934 GY, 1939 GN; 1956 VK
- Minor planet category: Main belt

Orbital characteristics
- Epoch 31 July 2016 (JD 2457600.5)
- Uncertainty parameter 0
- Observation arc: 132.11 yr (48,255 d)
- Aphelion: 3.06301 AU (458.220 Gm)
- Perihelion: 2.69787 AU (403.596 Gm)
- Semi-major axis: 2.88044 AU (430.908 Gm)
- Eccentricity: 0.063383
- Orbital period (sidereal): 4.89 yr (1,785.6 d)
- Orbital period (synodic): 17.1600 ± 0.0004 hr
- Average orbital speed: 17.54 km/s
- Mean anomaly: 178.096°
- Mean motion: 0° 12^{m} 5.803^{s} / day
- Inclination: 9.03035°
- Longitude of ascending node: 66.0344°
- Argument of perihelion: 209.338°

Physical characteristics
- Dimensions: 57.58±1.5 km
- Mass: (1.03±0.31)×10^{18} kg (Note: Calculated from its standard gravitational parameter GM = 0.069±0.021 km^{3}/s^{2}.)
- Mean density: 10.37 g/cm^{3}
- Synodic rotation period: 17.610 h (0.7338 d)
- Geometric albedo: 0.1580±0.009
- Spectral type: S
- Absolute magnitude (H): 8.9

235 Carolina is a sizeable Main belt asteroid. It was discovered by Austrian astronomer Johann Palisa on 28 November 1883 in Vienna, and was named after Caroline Island, now part of Kiribati in the Pacific Ocean. This asteroid is orbiting the Sun at a distance of 2.88 AU with a period of 4.89 yr and an eccentricity (ovalness) of 0.06. The orbital plane is tilted at an angle of 9.0° to the plane of the ecliptic.

Photometric data collected during 2007 were used to construct a light curve that demonstrated a rotation period of 17.1600±0.0004 h with a brightness variation of 0.30±0.02 in magnitude. It is a stony S-type asteroid.
