= 195 Eurykleia =

Main-belt asteroid

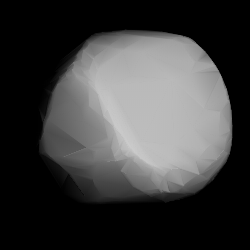
- 3D convex shape model of 195 Eurykleia

Discovery
- Discovered by: J. Palisa, 1879
- Discovery date: 19 April 1879

Designations
- Pronunciation: /jʊrɪˈkliːə/
- Alternative designations: A879 HA; 1949 QB_{2}
- Minor planet category: Main belt

Orbital characteristics
- Epoch 31 July 2016 (JD 2457600.5)
- Uncertainty parameter 0
- Observation arc: 131.99 yr (48,208 d)
- Aphelion: 3.00 AU (449.33 Gm)
- Perihelion: 2.75 AU (411.29 Gm)
- Semi-major axis: 2.88 AU (430.30 Gm)
- Eccentricity: 0.044205
- Orbital period (sidereal): 4.88 yr (1,781.9 d)
- Mean anomaly: 113.56°
- Mean motion: 0° 12^{m} 7.308^{s} / day
- Inclination: 6.9718°
- Longitude of ascending node: 6.9930°
- Argument of perihelion: 119.12°
- Earth MOID: 1.77 AU (264.87 Gm)
- Jupiter MOID: 2.01 AU (300.95 Gm)
- T_{Jupiter}: 3.284

Physical characteristics
- Mean diameter: 90.22±4.21 km (composite estimate)
- Mass: (6.0±6.0)×10^{17} kg (Note: Calculated from its standard gravitational parameter GM = 0.04±0.04 km^{3}/s^{2}.) (SB441)
- Mean density: 1.6±1.6 g/cm^{3} (calculated)
- Synodic rotation period: 16.52178±0.00001 h
- Geometric albedo: 0.0599±0.002
- Spectral type: Ch
- Absolute magnitude (H): 9.01

195 Eurykleia is a fairly large main belt asteroid. It was discovered by the Austrian astronomer Johann Palisa on April 19, 1879, and named after Euryclea, the wet-nurse of Odysseus in The Odyssey.

This body is orbiting the Sun with a period of 4.88 years and a low eccentricity (ovalness) of 0.04. The orbital plane is inclined by 7° from the plane of the ecliptic. It is spinning with a rotation period of 16.5 hours and varies in brightness with an amplitude of 0.24 magnitude. The cross-section diameter of this body is 90 km. The asteroid has a taxonomic type of Ch in the SMASS classification, which indicates it has a dark surface with a primitive carbonaceous composition.

195 Eurykleia has been observed to occult stars twice, once in 2011 and again in 2021.
