= 280 Philia =

Main-belt asteroid

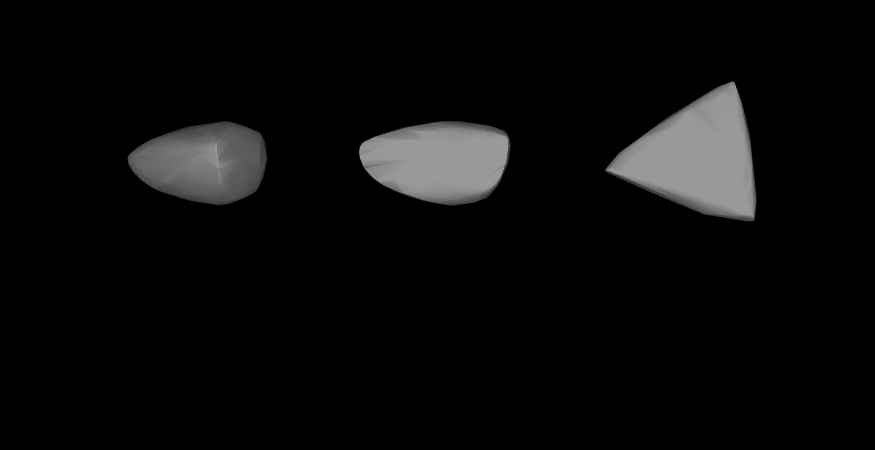
- Lightcurve-based 3D model of 280 Philia

Discovery
- Discovered by: Johann Palisa
- Discovery date: 29 October 1888

Designations
- Pronunciation: /ˈfɪliə/
- Named after: Philia (nymph)
- Alternative designations: A888 UB
- Minor planet category: Main belt

Orbital characteristics
- Epoch 31 July 2016 (JD 2457600.5)
- Uncertainty parameter 0
- Observation arc: 126.17 yr (46,083 d)
- Aphelion: 3.26133 AU (487.888 Gm)
- Perihelion: 2.62787 AU (393.124 Gm)
- Semi-major axis: 2.94460 AU (440.506 Gm)
- Eccentricity: 0.10756
- Orbital period (sidereal): 5.05 yr (1,845.6 d)
- Mean anomaly: 52.7987°
- Mean motion: 0° 11^{m} 42.212^{s} / day
- Inclination: 7.44582°
- Longitude of ascending node: 9.91179°
- Argument of perihelion: 90.0510°

Physical characteristics
- Dimensions: 45.69±2.0 km
- Synodic rotation period: 70.26 h (2.928 d)
- Geometric albedo: 0.0444±0.004
- Absolute magnitude (H): 10.9

280 Philia is a fairly large Main belt asteroid. It was discovered by Johann Palisa on 29 October 1888 at the Vienna Observatory.

Sparse data collected during a 1987 study indicated this asteroid has a rotation period of approximately 64 hours, which is much longer than can be continually observed from one site. During 2010−2011, an international collaboration to study the asteroid collected 9,037 photometric data points over 38 sessions. The resulting light curve analysis displays a rotation period of 70.26±0.03 h with a brightness variation of 0.15±0.02 in magnitude.
