= 782 Montefiore =

Main-belt asteroid

Discovery
- Discovered by: J. Palisa
- Discovery site: Vienna Observatory
- Discovery date: 18 March 1914

Designations
- Alternative designations: 1914 UK

Orbital characteristics
- Epoch 31 July 2016 (JD 2457600.5)
- Uncertainty parameter 0
- Observation arc: 100.50 yr (36708 d)
- Aphelion: 2.2639 AU (338.67 Gm)
- Perihelion: 2.0953 AU (313.45 Gm)
- Semi-major axis: 2.1796 AU (326.06 Gm)
- Eccentricity: 0.038666
- Orbital period (sidereal): 3.22 yr (1175.3 d)
- Mean anomaly: 310.813°
- Mean motion: 0° 18^{m} 22.68^{s} / day
- Inclination: 5.2605°
- Longitude of ascending node: 80.496°
- Argument of perihelion: 81.938°
- Earth MOID: 1.10938 AU (165.961 Gm)
- Jupiter MOID: 2.71157 AU (405.645 Gm)
- T_{Jupiter}: 3.675

Physical characteristics
- Mean radius: 5.94±0.3 km
- Synodic rotation period: 4.0728 h (0.16970 d)
- Geometric albedo: 0.2919±0.035
- Absolute magnitude (H): 11.3

782 Montefiore is a minor planet, specifically an asteroid orbiting in the asteroid belt that was discovered by Austrian astronomer Johann Palisa on 18 March 1914 and named for Clarice Sebag-Montefiore, wife of Alfons von Rothschild of Vienna. It is orbiting 2.18 AU from the Sun with an eccentricity of 0.04 and a period of 3.22 yr. The orbital plane of this asteroid is inclined by an angle of 5.26° to the plane of the ecliptic.

10μ radiometric data collected from Kitt Peak in 1975 gave a diameter estimate of 15 km. Photometric light curve studies from 1997 onward give a consistent rotation period of 4.07 hours.
