= 205 Martha =

Main-belt asteroid

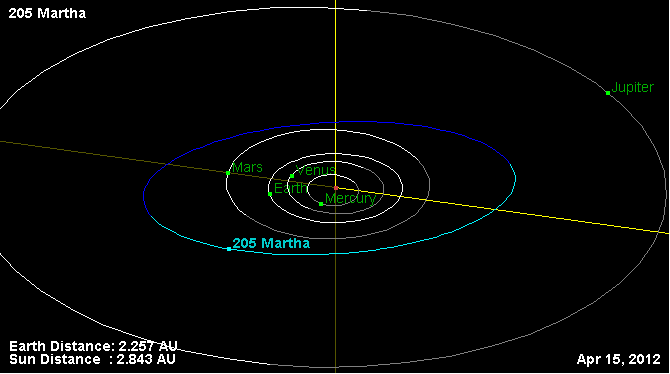
- Orbital diagram

Discovery
- Discovered by: Johann Palisa
- Discovery date: 13 October 1879

Designations
- Pronunciation: /ˈmɑːrθə/
- Named after: Martha of Bethany
- Alternative designations: A879 TB
- Minor planet category: Main belt

Orbital characteristics
- Epoch 31 July 2016 (JD 2457600.5)
- Uncertainty parameter 0
- Observation arc: 136.51 yr (49860 d)
- Aphelion: 2.8758 AU (430.21 Gm)
- Perihelion: 2.6783 AU (400.67 Gm)
- Semi-major axis: 2.7771 AU (415.45 Gm)
- Eccentricity: 0.035571
- Orbital period (sidereal): 4.63 yr (1690.3 d)
- Average orbital speed: 17.87 km/s
- Mean anomaly: 198.37°
- Mean motion: 0° 12^{m} 46.692^{s} / day
- Inclination: 10.696°
- Longitude of ascending node: 211.792°
- Argument of perihelion: 177.281°

Physical characteristics
- Mean diameter: 69.44±7.11 km (composite estimate)
- Mass: (7.0±1.6)×10^{17} kg (Note: Calculated from its standard gravitational parameter GM = 0.047±0.011 km^{3}/s^{2}.)
- Mean density: 2.96 g/cm^{3} (Note: Assuming a diameter of 77 km.)
- Synodic rotation period: 14.911 h (0.6213 d)
- Geometric albedo: 0.0553±0.002
- Spectral type: C
- Absolute magnitude (H): 9.23

205 Martha is a large main belt asteroid. It is a dark, primitive carbonaceous C-type asteroid. This object was discovered by Johann Palisa on 13 October 1879, in Pola and was named after Martha, a woman in the New Testament.

Efforts to determine the rotation period for this asteroid have produced wildly different results, in large part because the actual period is close to half of an Earth day. A study performed during 2013 showed that the light curve changed significantly during the observation period, adding to the difficulty. This study gave a synodic rotation period of 14.905 ± 0.001 h.
