= 975 Perseverantia =

Main-belt asteroid

Discovery
- Discovered by: Johann Palisa
- Discovery site: Vienna
- Discovery date: 27 March 1922

Designations
- Pronunciation: /pərsɛvəˈrænʃiə/
- Alternative designations: 1922 LT

Orbital characteristics
- Epoch 31 July 2016 (JD 2457600.5)
- Uncertainty parameter 0
- Observation arc: 94.00 yr (34333 days)
- Aphelion: 2.9205 AU (436.90 Gm)
- Perihelion: 2.7459 AU (410.78 Gm)
- Semi-major axis: 2.8332 AU (423.84 Gm)
- Eccentricity: 0.030814
- Orbital period (sidereal): 4.77 yr (1741.8 d)
- Mean anomaly: 5.31402°
- Mean motion: 0° 12^{m} 24.048^{s} / day
- Inclination: 2.5597°
- Longitude of ascending node: 38.717°
- Argument of perihelion: 56.640°

Physical characteristics
- Mean radius: 13.245±0.85 km
- Synodic rotation period: 7.267 h (0.3028 d)
- Geometric albedo: 0.1726±0.024
- Absolute magnitude (H): 10.41

975 Perseverantia /pərsɛvəˈrænʃiə/ is a minor planet orbiting the Sun that was discovered by Austrian astronomer Johann Palisa on 27 March 1922.

This is a member of the dynamic Koronis family of asteroids that most likely formed as the result of a collisional breakup of a parent body. The semi-major axis of the orbit of 975 Perseverantia lies just outside the 5/2 Kirkwood gap, located at 2.824 AU.
