= 652 Jubilatrix =

Main-belt asteroid

Discovery
- Discovered by: J. Palisa
- Discovery site: Vienna
- Discovery date: 4 November 1907

Designations
- Pronunciation: /ˈdʒuːbɪleɪtrɪks/
- Alternative designations: 1907 AU

Orbital characteristics
- Epoch 31 July 2016 (JD 2457600.5)
- Uncertainty parameter 0
- Observation arc: 107.23 yr (39,167 d)
- Aphelion: 2.8787 AU (430.65 Gm)
- Perihelion: 2.2303 AU (333.65 Gm)
- Semi-major axis: 2.5545 AU (382.15 Gm)
- Eccentricity: 0.12692
- Orbital period (sidereal): 4.08 yr (1,491.3 d)
- Mean anomaly: 263.74°
- Mean motion: 0° 14^{m} 29.04^{s} / day
- Inclination: 15.743°
- Longitude of ascending node: 86.195°
- Argument of perihelion: 277.192°
- Earth MOID: 1.29279 AU (193.399 Gm)
- Jupiter MOID: 2.62703 AU (392.998 Gm)
- T_{Jupiter}: 3.375

Physical characteristics
- Mean radius: 8.435±0.8 km
- Synodic rotation period: 2.6627 h (0.11095 d)
- Geometric albedo: 0.1710±0.038
- Absolute magnitude (H): 10.9

652 Jubilatrix is a minor planet, specifically an asteroid orbiting in the asteroid belt. It was discovered on 4 November 1907 by Austrian astronomer Johann Palisa, and was named in honor of the 60th anniversary of the reign of Franz Joseph. The asteroid is orbiting at a distance of 2.55 AU with a period of 4.08 yr and an eccentricity of 0.127. It is a member of the Maria dynamic family. Photometric observations provide a rotation period of 2.6627±0.0001 h with a brightness variation of 0.27±0.03 in magnitude.
