= 583 Klotilde =

Main-belt asteroid

Discovery
- Discovered by: J. Palisa
- Discovery site: Vienna
- Discovery date: 31 December 1905

Designations
- Pronunciation: /kloʊˈtɪldiː/
- Alternative designations: 1905 SP

Orbital characteristics
- Epoch 31 July 2016 (JD 2457600.5)
- Uncertainty parameter 0
- Observation arc: 109.23 yr (39898 d)
- Aphelion: 3.6824 AU (550.88 Gm)
- Perihelion: 2.6586 AU (397.72 Gm)
- Semi-major axis: 3.1705 AU (474.30 Gm)
- Eccentricity: 0.16144
- Orbital period (sidereal): 5.65 yr (2062.0 d)
- Mean anomaly: 88.7841°
- Mean motion: 0° 10^{m} 28.524^{s} / day
- Inclination: 8.2452°
- Longitude of ascending node: 257.876°
- Argument of perihelion: 252.303°

Physical characteristics
- Mean radius: 40.82±1.4 km
- Synodic rotation period: 9.2135 h (0.38390 d)
- Geometric albedo: 0.0660±0.005
- Absolute magnitude (H): 9.01

583 Klotilde is a minor planet orbiting the Sun.
