= 214 Aschera =

Main-belt asteroid

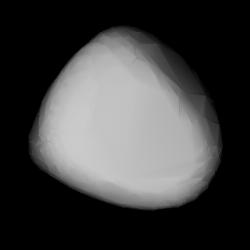
- 3D convex shape model of 214 Aschera

Discovery
- Discovered by: Johann Palisa
- Discovery date: 29 February 1880

Designations
- Pronunciation: /əˈʃɪərə/
- Alternative designations: A880 DB, 1903 SE; 1947 BP, 1948 JE; 1949 QG_{2}, 1949 SX_{1} 1950 XH, 1953 OO
- Minor planet category: Main belt

Orbital characteristics
- Epoch 31 July 2016 (JD 2457600.5)
- Uncertainty parameter 0
- Observation arc: 136.09 yr (49707 d)
- Aphelion: 2.6938 AU (402.99 Gm)
- Perihelion: 2.5279 AU (378.17 Gm)
- Semi-major axis: 2.6108 AU (390.57 Gm)
- Eccentricity: 0.031762
- Orbital period (sidereal): 4.22 yr (1,540.9 d)
- Average orbital speed: 18.43 km/s
- Mean anomaly: 167.065°
- Mean motion: 0° 14^{m} 1.068^{s} / day
- Inclination: 3.4364°
- Longitude of ascending node: 341.997°
- Argument of perihelion: 131.579°

Physical characteristics
- Dimensions: 23.16±1.0 km
- Synodic rotation period: 6.835 h (0.2848 d)
- Geometric albedo: 0.5220±0.048
- Spectral type: E
- Absolute magnitude (H): 9.2

214 Aschera is a Main belt asteroid. It was discovered by Austrian astronomer Johann Palisa on February 29, 1880, in Pola and was named after the Sidonian goddess Asherah. This minor planet is orbiting the Sun at a distance of 2.61 AU with a low eccentricity of 0.032 and an orbital period of 4.22 yr. The orbital plane is inclined at an angle of 3.44° to the plane of the ecliptic.

It is classified as a rare E-type asteroid and is fairly faint for an object of its type. The overall diameter is estimated to be 23 km and it has a geometric albedo of 0.52. Photometric data collected during September 2021 was used the generate a lightcurve for 214 Aschera. This showed a rotation period of 6.833±0.004 h with a brightness variation of 0.20 magnitude. Using a tri-axial ellipsoidal model derived from light curve data, the overall shape of the asteroid is estimated to be a/b = 1.24 ± 0.12 and b/c = 1.83 ± 0.10, where a, b, c are the three axes of an ellipsoid.
