= 309 Fraternitas =

Main-belt asteroid

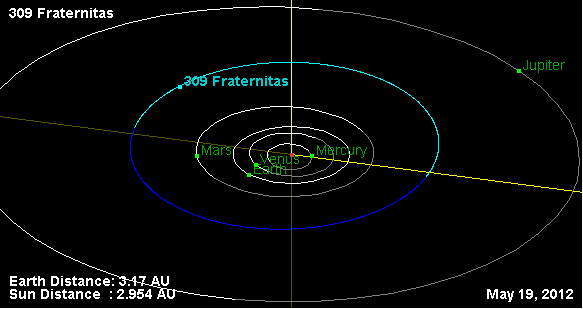
- Orbital diagram

Discovery
- Discovered by: Johann Palisa
- Discovery date: 6 April 1891

Designations
- Pronunciation: /frəˈtɜːrnɪtæs/
- Named after: fraternity
- Minor planet category: Main belt

Orbital characteristics
- Epoch 31 July 2016 (JD 2457600.5)
- Uncertainty parameter 0
- Observation arc: 125.03 yr (45667 d)
- Aphelion: 2.97127 AU (444.496 Gm)
- Perihelion: 2.35779 AU (352.720 Gm)
- Semi-major axis: 2.66453 AU (398.608 Gm)
- Eccentricity: 0.11512
- Orbital period (sidereal): 4.35 yr (1,588.7 d) 4.35 yr (1588.7 d)
- Mean anomaly: 190.308°
- Mean motion: 0° 13^{m} 35.785^{s} / day
- Inclination: 3.71999°
- Longitude of ascending node: 356.574°
- Argument of perihelion: 310.477°

Physical characteristics
- Dimensions: 45.32±3.3 km
- Synodic rotation period: 22.398 h (0.9333 d)
- Geometric albedo: 0.0595±0.010
- Absolute magnitude (H): 10.7

309 Fraternitas is a typical Main belt asteroid. It was discovered by Johann Palisa on 6 April 1891 in Vienna. The asteroid name is Latin for 'fraternity'; it was so named in order to commemorate the 25th anniversary of the Maturitätsprüfung Fraternity.

This minor planet is orbiting the Sun at a distance of 2.665 AU with an orbital eccentricity (ovalness) of 0.115 and a period of 4.35 yr. The orbital plane is inclined at an angle of 3.72° of the ecliptic. Analysis of the asymmetric bimodal light curve of the asteroid from photometric data collected during 2014 provide a rotation period of 22.398±0.001 h with a brightness variation of 0.12±0.01 in magnitude.
