= 687 Tinette =

Asteroid

Discovery
- Discovered by: J. Palisa
- Discovery site: Vienna
- Discovery date: 16 August 1909

Designations
- Alternative designations: 1909 HG

Orbital characteristics
- Epoch 31 July 2016 (JD 2457600.5)
- Uncertainty parameter 0
- Observation arc: 97.38 yr (35569 d)
- Aphelion: 3.4628 AU (518.03 Gm)
- Perihelion: 1.9794 AU (296.11 Gm)
- Semi-major axis: 2.7211 AU (407.07 Gm)
- Eccentricity: 0.27256
- Orbital period (sidereal): 4.49 yr (1639.5 d)
- Mean anomaly: 260.701°
- Mean motion: 0° 13^{m} 10.488^{s} / day
- Inclination: 14.878°
- Longitude of ascending node: 334.346°
- Argument of perihelion: 52.932°

Physical characteristics
- Mean diameter: 22±0.5 km
- Mass: 1.9×10^{16} kg (estimate)
- Synodic rotation period: 7.40 h (0.308 d)
- Geometric albedo: 0.079
- Temperature: unknown
- Absolute magnitude (H): 11.71

687 Tinette is a minor planet, specifically an asteroid orbiting primarily in the asteroid belt. It was discovered by Austrian astronomer Johann Palisa on 16 August 1909 from Vienna and was given the preliminary designation 1909 HG.

Photometric observations at the Palmer Divide Observatory in Colorado Springs, Colorado, in 1999 were used to build a light curve for this object. The asteroid displayed a rotation period of 7.40 ± 0.02 hours and a brightness variation of 0.25 ± 0.01 in magnitude.
