= 730 Athanasia =

Background asteroid

Discovery
- Discovered by: J. Palisa
- Discovery site: Vienna Obs.
- Discovery date: 10 April 1912

Designations
- Pronunciation: /ˌæθəˈneɪʒiə/
- Named after: Immortality (from Greek)
- Alternative designations: A912 GG · 2016 FP_{6} 1912 OK
- Minor planet category: main-belt · (inner); background

Orbital characteristics
- Epoch 31 May 2020 (JD 2459000.5)
- Uncertainty parameter 0
- Observation arc: 108.05 yr (39,464 d)
- Aphelion: 2.6429 AU
- Perihelion: 1.8450 AU
- Semi-major axis: 2.2440 AU
- Eccentricity: 0.1778
- Orbital period (sidereal): 3.36 yr (1,228 d)
- Mean anomaly: 52.393°
- Mean motion: 0° 17^{m} 35.52^{s} / day
- Inclination: 4.2348°
- Longitude of ascending node: 95.073°
- Argument of perihelion: 123.60°

Physical characteristics
- Mean diameter: 4.497±0.734 km
- Synodic rotation period: 5.7348±0.0001 h (Note: Lightcurve-plot of (730) Athanasia, by Frederick Pilcher at the Organ Mesa Observatory (2016). Rotation period of 5.7348 hours with a brightness amplitude of 0.63 mag. Quality code is 3. Summary figures at the LCDB and ALSC websites.)
- Geometric albedo: 0.289±0.123
- Spectral type: S (assumed)
- Absolute magnitude (H): 13.7; 13.90

730 Athanasia (prov. designation: A912 GG or 1912 OK) is a background asteroid from the inner regions of the asteroid belt, approximately 4.5 kilometers (2.8 miles) in diameter. It was discovered by Austrian astronomer Johann Palisa at the Vienna Observatory on 10 April 1912. The presumed stony S-type asteroid has a rotation period of 5.7 hours and is likely very elongated in shape. It was named Athanasia, the Greek word for "immortality".

== Orbit and classification ==
Located in the region of the Flora family (402), a giant asteroid family and the largest family of stony asteroids in the main-belt, Athanasia is a non-family asteroid of the main belt's background population when applying the hierarchical clustering method to its proper orbital elements. It orbits the Sun in the inner asteroid belt at a distance of 1.8–2.6 AU once every 3 years and 4 months (1,228 days; semi-major axis of 2.24 AU). Its orbit has an eccentricity of 0.18 and an inclination of 4° with respect to the ecliptic. The body's observation arc begins at Vienna Observatory on 15 April 1912, or five nights after its official discovery observation.

== Naming ==
This minor planet was named by friends of the discoverer after the Greek word for immortality, "athanasia". Any reference to a person or occurrence is unknown. The naming was mentioned in The Names of the Minor Planets by Paul Herget in 1955 (H 73).

== Physical characteristics ==
Athanasia is an assumed, stony S-type asteroid.

=== Rotation period ===
In February 2016, a rotational lightcurve of Athanasia was obtained from photometric observations by Frederick Pilcher at the Organ Mesa Observatory (G50) in New Mexico, United States. Analysis gave a classically shaped, well-defined bimodal lightcurve with a rotation period of 5.7348±0.0001 hours and a very high brightness variation of 0.63±0.04 magnitude, indicative of a highly elongated shape (U=3). In May 2013, Pilcher already observed the object and reported an ambiguous period of 5.7345 or 8.6016 hours with an amplitude of 0.14 magnitude (U=2+). (Note: Lightcurve-plot of (730) Athanasia, by Frederick Pilcher at the Organ Mesa Observatory (2013). Rotation period of 5.7345 hours with a brightness amplitude of 0.14 mag. Quality code is 2+. Summary figures at the LCDB and ALSC websites.)

=== Diameter and albedo ===
According to the survey carried out by the NEOWISE mission of NASA's Wide-field Infrared Survey Explorer, Athanasia measures (4.497±0.734) kilometers in diameter and its surface has a high albedo of (0.289±0.123). The Collaborative Asteroid Lightcurve Link assumes a standard albedo for a Florian asteroid of 0.24 and calculates a diameter of 4.94 kilometers based on an absolute magnitude of 13.7.
