= 244 Sita =

Main-belt asteroid

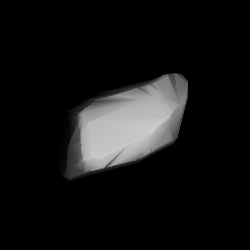
- 3D model based on lightcurve data

Discovery
- Discovered by: Johann Palisa
- Discovery date: 14 October 1884

Designations
- Pronunciation: /ˈsiːtə/
- Named after: Sita
- Alternative designations: A884 TA, 1900 UA; 1957 KT, 1976 HY; 1979 FL_{3}
- Minor planet category: main-belt

Orbital characteristics
- Epoch 31 July 2016 (JD 2457600.5)
- Uncertainty parameter 0
- Observation arc: 130.93 yr (47824 d)
- Aphelion: 2.47317 AU (369.981 Gm)
- Perihelion: 1.87531 AU (280.542 Gm)
- Semi-major axis: 2.17424 AU (325.262 Gm)
- Eccentricity: 0.13749
- Orbital period (sidereal): 3.21 yr (1,171.0 d)
- Mean anomaly: 46.3767°
- Mean motion: 0° 18^{m} 26.737^{s} / day
- Inclination: 2.84423°
- Longitude of ascending node: 208.982°
- Argument of perihelion: 166.029°

Physical characteristics
- Mean diameter: 11.077±0.022 km 11 km
- Mass: ~2×10^{15} (estimate)
- Mean density: ~2.7 g/cm^{3} (estimate)
- Synodic rotation period: 129.51 h (5.396 d)
- Geometric albedo: 0.1941±0.033; 0.194
- Spectral type: S
- Absolute magnitude (H): 11.9

244 Sita is a background asteroid from the inner region of the asteroid belt, approximately 11 kilometers (6.8 miles) in diameter. It was discovered on 14 October 1884 by Austrian astronomer Johann Palisa in the Vienna Observatory and was named after wife of Rama, Sita.

This minor planet is orbiting the Sun at a distance of 2.17 AU with an eccentricity of 0.137 and an orbital period of 3.21 yr. The orbital plane is tilted at an angle of 2.84° to the plane of the ecliptic. It is spinning slowly, completing a rotation about its axis once every 129.056 ± 0.021 h (5.377 ± 0.001 d).
