= 262 Valda =

Main belt asteroid

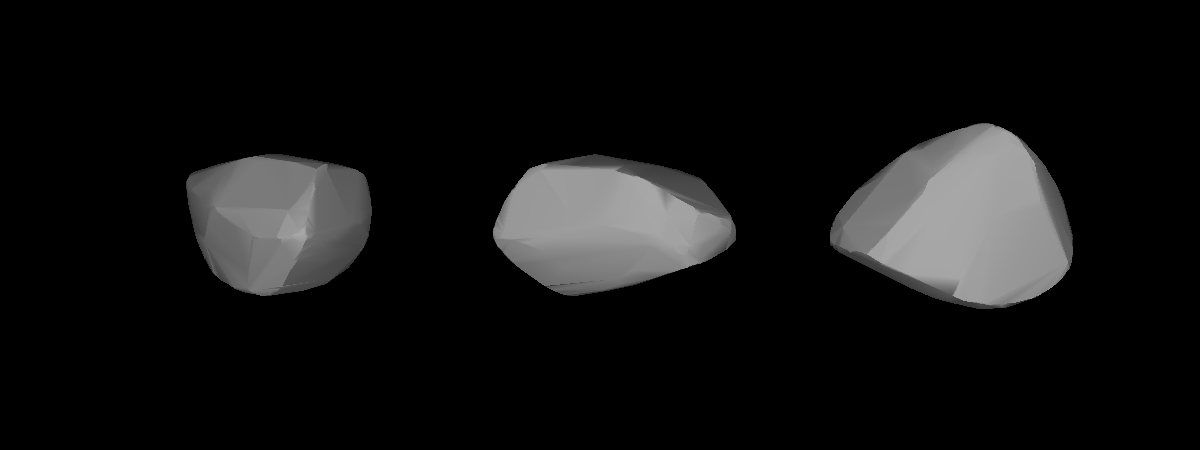
- Lightcurve-based 3D model of 262 Valda

Discovery
- Discovered by: Johann Palisa
- Discovery date: 3 November 1886

Designations
- Alternative designations: A886 VA, 1972 YR_{1}
- Minor planet category: Main belt

Orbital characteristics
- Epoch 31 July 2016 (JD 2457600.5)
- Uncertainty parameter 0
- Observation arc: 125.45 yr (45822 d)
- Aphelion: 3.0975 AU (463.38 Gm)
- Perihelion: 2.00585 AU (300.071 Gm)
- Semi-major axis: 2.55168 AU (381.726 Gm)
- Eccentricity: 0.21391
- Orbital period (sidereal): 4.08 yr (1488.8 d)
- Mean anomaly: 268.471°
- Mean motion: 0° 14^{m} 30.48^{s} / day
- Inclination: 7.6870°
- Longitude of ascending node: 38.489°
- Argument of perihelion: 25.399°

Physical characteristics
- Synodic rotation period: 17.386 h (0.7244 d)
- Absolute magnitude (H): 11.67

262 Valda is a main belt asteroid that was discovered by Austrian astronomer Johann Palisa on 3 November 1886 in Vienna. The name was proposed by Bettina von Rothschild, though the origin of the name is unknown.

Photometric observations of this asteroid from the Organ Mesa Observatory in Las Cruces, New Mexico, during 2010 gave a light curve with a period of 17.386 ± 0.001 hours and a brightness variation of 0.17 ± 0.02 magnitude.
