= 903 Nealley =

Main-belt asteroid

Discovery
- Discovered by: Johann Palisa
- Discovery site: Vienna
- Discovery date: 13 September 1918

Designations
- Alternative designations: 1918 EM

Orbital characteristics
- Epoch 31 July 2016 (JD 2457600.5)
- Uncertainty parameter 0
- Observation arc: 97.59 yr (35646 days)
- Aphelion: 3.3819 AU (505.93 Gm)
- Perihelion: 3.0934 AU (462.77 Gm)
- Semi-major axis: 3.2377 AU (484.35 Gm)
- Eccentricity: 0.044562
- Orbital period (sidereal): 5.83 yr (2127.9 d)
- Mean anomaly: 229.469°
- Mean motion: 0° 10^{m} 9.048^{s} / day
- Inclination: 11.781°
- Longitude of ascending node: 159.404°
- Argument of perihelion: 235.383°
- Earth MOID: 2.11158 AU (315.888 Gm)
- Jupiter MOID: 1.84491 AU (275.995 Gm)
- T_{Jupiter}: 3.150

Physical characteristics
- Mean radius: 31.715±1 km
- Synodic rotation period: 21.60 h (0.900 d)
- Geometric albedo: 0.0528±0.004
- Absolute magnitude (H): 10.0

903 Nealley is a minor planet orbiting the Sun. The semi-major axis of the orbit of 903 Nealley lies just inside the Hecuba gap, located at 3.27 AU.
