= 248 Lameia =

Asteroid

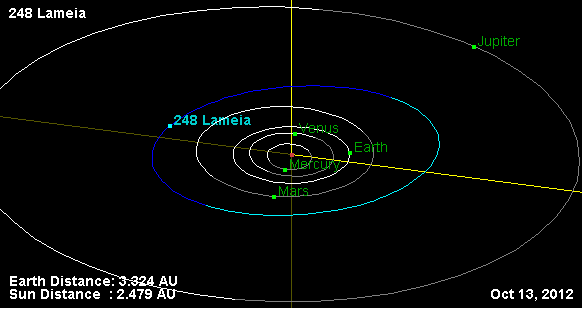
- Orbital diagram

Discovery
- Discovered by: Johann Palisa
- Discovery date: 5 June 1885

Designations
- Pronunciation: /ləˈmiːə/
- Named after: Lamia
- Alternative designations: A885 LA, 1959 LO
- Minor planet category: Main belt

Orbital characteristics
- Epoch 31 July 2016 (JD 2457600.5)
- Uncertainty parameter 0
- Observation arc: 130.86 yr (47,796 d)
- Aphelion: 2.64 AU (394.30 Gm)
- Perihelion: 2.31 AU (345.06 Gm)
- Semi-major axis: 2.47 AU (369.67 Gm)
- Eccentricity: 0.066588
- Orbital period (sidereal): 3.88 yr (1,418.9 d)
- Average orbital speed: 18.95 km/s
- Mean anomaly: 264.207°
- Mean motion: 0° 15^{m} 13.392^{s} / day
- Inclination: 4.0581°
- Longitude of ascending node: 246.845°
- Argument of perihelion: 10.782°

Physical characteristics
- Dimensions: 48.66±2.5 km
- Synodic rotation period: 11.912 h (0.4963 d)
- Geometric albedo: 0.0615±0.007
- Absolute magnitude (H): 10.2

248 Lameia is a typical main belt asteroid. It was discovered by Austrian astronomer Johann Palisa on 5 June 1885 in Vienna and was named after the Lamia, a lover of Zeus in Ancient Greek mythology. 248 Lameia is orbiting the Sun with a period of 3.88 years and a low eccentricity (ovalness) of 0.067. The semimajor axis of 2.47 AU is slightly inward from the 3:1 Kirkwood Gap. Its orbital plane is inclined by 4° to the plane of the ecliptic.

On 27 June 1998 an occultation of the 8th magnitude star PPM 236753 (HD 188960) by 248 Lameia was timed by five observers near Gauteng, South Africa. The chords produced a rough size estimate of a 62 × 53 km ellipse. The size estimate based on IRAS Minor Planet Survey data is ~49 km. The rotation rate of this object is commensurate with the rotation of the Earth, requiring observations from different locations to build a complete light curve. These yield a rotation estimate of 11.912±0.001 h with a brightness variation of 0.17±0.01 magnitude in amplitude. The same data set gives a size estimate of 47±3 km, in agreement with earlier measurements.

Infrared imaging of this body shows a relatively featureless spectra that suggests materials that are similar to carbonaceous chondrite meteorites.
