= 263 Dresda =

Main-belt asteroid

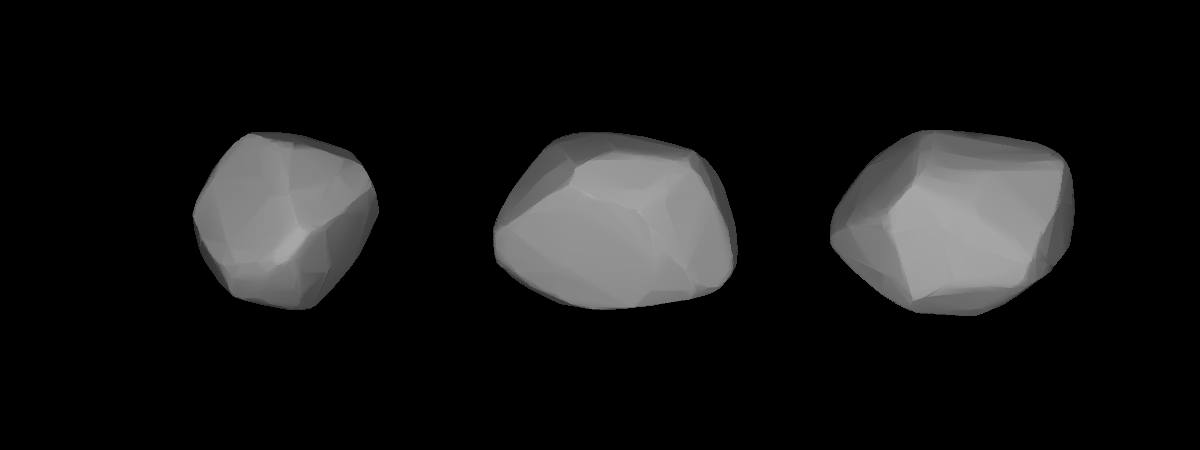
- Lightcurve-based 3D model of 263 Dresda

Discovery
- Discovered by: Johann Palisa
- Discovery date: 3 November 1886

Designations
- Pronunciation: /ˈdrɛzdə/
- Named after: Dresden
- Alternative designations: A886 VB, 1905 OC; 1915 RL, 1917 BA; 1950 XV, 1977 PC
- Minor planet category: Main belt (Koronis)

Orbital characteristics
- Epoch 31 July 2016 (JD 2457600.5)
- Uncertainty parameter 0
- Observation arc: 118.15 yr (43153 d)
- Aphelion: 3.10916 AU (465.124 Gm)
- Perihelion: 2.66885 AU (399.254 Gm)
- Semi-major axis: 2.88900 AU (432.188 Gm)
- Eccentricity: 0.076205
- Orbital period (sidereal): 4.91 yr (1793.6 d)
- Average orbital speed: 17.53 km/s
- Mean anomaly: 178.711°
- Mean motion: 0° 12^{m} 2.578^{s} / day
- Inclination: 1.31813°
- Longitude of ascending node: 216.168°
- Argument of perihelion: 162.281°

Physical characteristics
- Dimensions: 23.24±1.9 km
- Synodic rotation period: 16.809 h (0.7004 d)
- Geometric albedo: 0.2263±0.043
- Absolute magnitude (H): 10.2

263 Dresda is a typical Main belt asteroid. It belongs to the Koronis family of asteroids.

It has a lightly coloured surface and likely is not composed of carbonaceous materials, but is similar in composition as another Koronis family member, 243 Ida.

It was discovered by Johann Palisa on 3 November 1886 in Vienna.

The asteroid's name derives from the German city of Dresden.
