= 711 Marmulla =

Main-belt asteroid

Discovery
- Discovered by: J. Palisa
- Discovery site: Vienna Obs.
- Discovery date: 1 March 1911

Designations
- Pronunciation: /mɑːrˈmʌlə/
- Alternative designations: 1911 LN; 1927 AB

Orbital characteristics
- Epoch 31 July 2016 (JD 2457600.5)
- Uncertainty parameter 0
- Observation arc: 102.99 yr (37,618 d)
- Aphelion: 2.6745 AU (400.10 Gm)
- Perihelion: 1.8003 AU (269.32 Gm)
- Semi-major axis: 2.2374 AU (334.71 Gm)
- Eccentricity: 0.19535
- Orbital period (sidereal): 3.35 yr (1,222.4 d)
- Mean anomaly: 65.0629°
- Mean motion: 0° 17^{m} 40.2^{s} / day
- Inclination: 6.0917°
- Longitude of ascending node: 357.091°
- Argument of perihelion: 300.339°
- Earth MOID: 0.793851 AU (118.7584 Gm)
- Jupiter MOID: 2.55306 AU (381.932 Gm)
- T_{Jupiter}: 3.605

Physical characteristics
- Synodic rotation period: 2.88 ± 0.12 h (0.120 ± 0.00500 d)
- Absolute magnitude (H): 11.7

711 Marmulla is an asteroid belonging to the Flora family in the Main Belt. It was discovered 1 March 1911 by Austrian astronomer Johann Palisa. The asteroid name may be derived from the Old High German word 'marmul', which means 'marble'. This asteroid is orbiting 2.24 AU from the Sun with a period of 3.35 yr and an eccentricity (ovalness) of 0.195. The orbital plane of 711 Marmulla is inclined at an angle of 6.1° to the plane of the ecliptic.

Photometric observations of this asteroid in 2019 resulted in a light curve showing a rotation period of 2.721±0.003 h with a brightness variation of 0.06 in magnitude. This result is consistent with a similar study earlier in the year. A. Kryszczynska and associates had found a slightly longer rotation period of 2.88 hours in 2012. The low amplitude of the variation suggests a nearly spherical shape. The spectrum of 711 Marmulla most closely matches an A-type asteroid.
