= 321 Florentina =

Main-belt asteroid

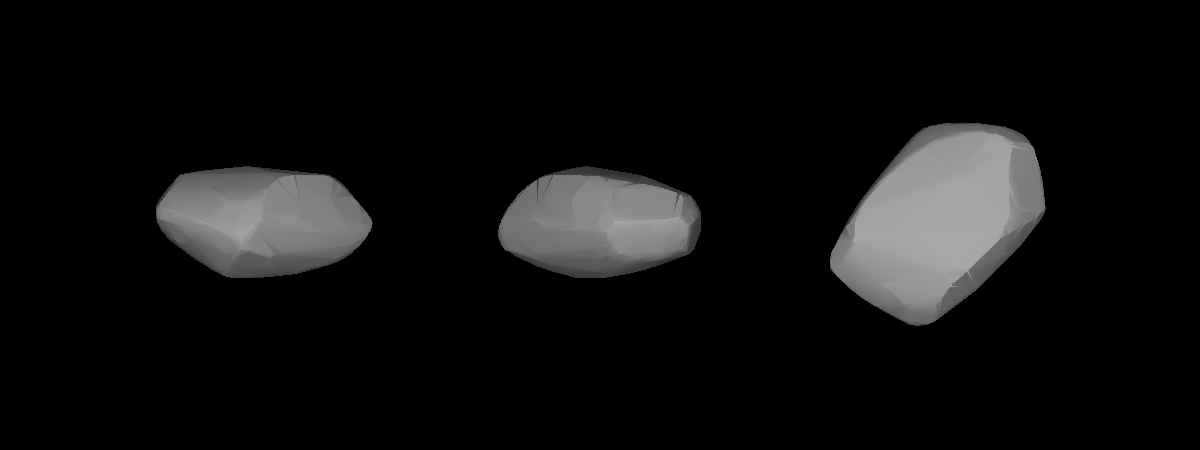
- A three-dimensional model of 321 Florentina based on its lightcurve

Discovery
- Discovered by: Johann Palisa
- Discovery date: 15 October 1891

Designations
- Pronunciation: /flɒrənˈtaɪnə/
- Minor planet category: Main belt (Koronis)

Orbital characteristics
- Epoch 31 July 2016 (JD 2457600.5)
- Uncertainty parameter 0
- Observation arc: 118.15 yr (43153 d)
- Aphelion: 3.01879 AU (451.605 Gm)
- Perihelion: 2.7543 AU (412.04 Gm)
- Semi-major axis: 2.88657 AU (431.825 Gm)
- Eccentricity: 0.045806
- Orbital period (sidereal): 4.90 yr (1,791.3 d)
- Mean anomaly: 120.99°
- Mean motion: 0° 12^{m} 3.492^{s} / day
- Inclination: 2.5876°
- Longitude of ascending node: 40.224°
- Argument of perihelion: 37.310°

Physical characteristics
- Dimensions: 27.23±1.5 km
- Synodic rotation period: 2.871 h (0.1196 d)
- Geometric albedo: 0.2296±0.028
- Absolute magnitude (H): 10.1

321 Florentina is an S-type (stony) main belt asteroid with a diameter of 28 km. It was discovered by Johann Palisa on 15 October 1891 in Vienna. He named the asteroid for his daughter, Florentine. Between 1874 and 1923, Palisa discovered a total of 122 asteroids.

This asteroid is a dynamic member of the Koronis family. It is orbiting the Sun at a distance of 2.887 AU with an eccentricity (ovalness) of 0.046 and an orbital period of 4.90 yr. The orbital plane is inclined at an angle of 2.59° to the plane of the ecliptic. Photometric data collected during the asteroid opposition of 2011 was used to construct a light curve that displayed a rotation period of 2.870±0.001 h. This is consistent with previous rotation estimates.

A group of astronomers, including Lucy d'Escoffier Crespo da Silva, contributed data toward the discovery of spin-vector alignments in the Koronis family, which includes (321) Florentina. This was based on observations made between 1998 through 2000. The collaborative work resulted in the creation of 61 new individual rotation lightcurves to augment previous published observations.
