= 671 Carnegia =

Main-belt asteroid

Discovery
- Discovered by: J. Palisa
- Discovery site: Vienna
- Discovery date: 21 September 1908

Designations
- Alternative designations: 1908 DV

Orbital characteristics
- Epoch 31 July 2016 (JD 2457600.5)
- Uncertainty parameter 0
- Observation arc: 101.44 yr (37051 d)
- Aphelion: 3.3007 AU (493.78 Gm)
- Perihelion: 2.8843 AU (431.49 Gm)
- Semi-major axis: 3.0925 AU (462.63 Gm)
- Eccentricity: 0.067333
- Orbital period (sidereal): 5.44 yr (1986.4 d)
- Mean anomaly: 209.328°
- Mean motion: 0° 10^{m} 52.428^{s} / day
- Inclination: 8.0287°
- Longitude of ascending node: 0.51883°
- Argument of perihelion: 91.179°

Physical characteristics
- Mean radius: 29.36±2.8 km
- Synodic rotation period: 8.332 h (0.3472 d)
- Geometric albedo: 0.0512±0.011
- Absolute magnitude (H): 10.2

671 Carnegia is a minor planet orbiting the Sun.
