= 183 Istria =

Main-belt asteroid

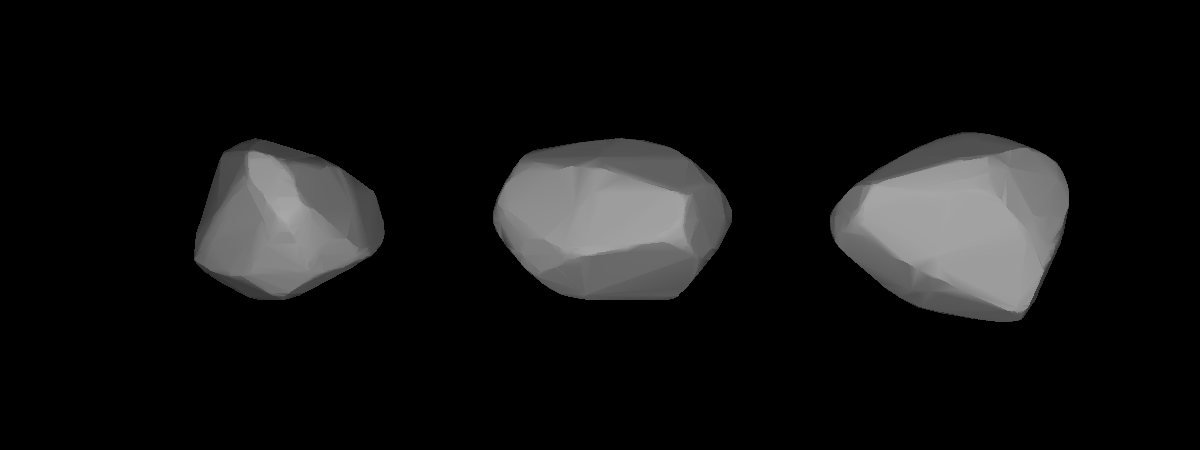
- Lightcurve-based 3D-model of Istria

Discovery
- Discovered by: J. Palisa
- Discovery site: Austrian Naval Obs.
- Discovery date: 8 February 1878

Designations
- Pronunciation: /ˈɪstriə/
- Named after: Istrian Peninsula (in the Adriatic Sea)
- Alternative designations: A878 CD; 1948 CG
- Minor planet category: main-belt · (middle) background

Orbital characteristics
- Epoch 23 March 2018 (JD 2458200.5)
- Uncertainty parameter 0
- Observation arc: 112.08 yr (40,937 d)
- Aphelion: 3.7699 AU
- Perihelion: 1.8117 AU
- Semi-major axis: 2.7908 AU
- Eccentricity: 0.3508
- Orbital period (sidereal): 4.66 yr (1,703 d)
- Mean anomaly: 61.603°
- Mean motion: 0° 12^{m} 41.04^{s} / day
- Inclination: 26.391°
- Longitude of ascending node: 141.95°
- Argument of perihelion: 264.12°

Physical characteristics
- Mean diameter: 30.779±0.278 km 32.927±0.168 km 34.55±0.84 km 35.43±2.8 km
- Synodic rotation period: 11.6±0.5 h 11.77 h
- Geometric albedo: 0.1890±0.034; 0.201±0.012; 0.227±0.038; 0.2582±0.0384
- Spectral type: Tholen = S SMASS = S S B–V = 0.842; U–B = 0.359
- Absolute magnitude (H): 9.56±0.45; 9.66; 9.68

183 Istria is a stony background asteroid from the central regions of the asteroid belt, approximately 33 kilometers (21 miles) in diameter. It was discovered on 8 February 1878, by Austrian astronomer Johann Palisa at the Austrian Naval Observatory in Pola, in what is now Croatia. The S-type asteroid has a rotation period of 11.77 hours. It was named for the Istrian Peninsula.

== Orbit and classification ==
Istria is a non-family asteroid from the main belt's background population. It orbits the Sun in the central main-belt at a distance of 1.8–3.8 AU once every 4 years and 8 months (1,703 days; semi-major axis of 2.79 AU). Its orbit has an eccentricity of 0.35 and an inclination of 26° with respect to the ecliptic.

== Physical characteristics ==
Istria has been characterized as a common, stony S-type asteroid in both the Tholen and SMASS classification.

=== Rotation period ===
In August 1979, a rotational lightcurve of Istria was obtained from photometric observations by American astronomer Alain Harris. Lightcurve analysis gave a well-defined rotation period of 11.77 hours with a brightness amplitude of 0.31 magnitude (U=3). Observations by French amateur astronomer Laurent Bernasconi gave a similar period of 11.6 hours (U=2).

=== Diameter and albedo ===
According to the surveys carried out by the Infrared Astronomical Satellite IRAS, the Japanese Akari satellite and the NEOWISE mission of NASA's Wide-field Infrared Survey Explorer, Istria measures between 30.779 and 35.43 kilometers in diameter and its surface has an albedo between 0.1890 and 0.2582.

== Naming ==
This minor planet was named after the Istrian Peninsula in the Adriatic Sea, where the city of Pula (then Pola) with its discovering observatory is located. A the time the peninsula was part of the Austro-Hungarian Empire. The asteroid's name was given by Vice-Admiral Bernhard von Wüllerstorf-Urbair, who is known as the captain of the first Austrian circumnavigatory adventure with the sail frigate SMS Novara. The official naming citation was mentioned in The Names of the Minor Planets by Paul Herget in 1955 (H 183).
