= 996 Hilaritas =

Main-belt asteroid

Discovery
- Discovered by: J. Palisa
- Discovery site: Vienna
- Discovery date: 21 March 1923

Designations
- Pronunciation: /hɪˈlærɪtæs/
- Alternative designations: 1923 NM

Orbital characteristics
- Epoch 31 July 2016 (JD 2457600.5)
- Uncertainty parameter 0
- Observation arc: 88.16 yr (32200 days)
- Aphelion: 3.5220 AU (526.88 Gm)
- Perihelion: 2.6535 AU (396.96 Gm)
- Semi-major axis: 3.0878 AU (461.93 Gm)
- Eccentricity: 0.14063
- Orbital period (sidereal): 5.43 yr (1981.8 d)
- Mean anomaly: 93.831°
- Mean motion: 0° 10^{m} 53.94^{s} / day
- Inclination: 0.65948°
- Longitude of ascending node: 347.404°
- Argument of perihelion: 147.140°

Physical characteristics
- Mean radius: 14.765±0.65 km
- Synodic rotation period: 10.05 h (0.419 d)
- Geometric albedo: 0.0901±0.009
- Absolute magnitude (H): 10.88

996 Hilaritas is a Themistian asteroid. It was discovered in 1923 by Austrian astronomer Johann Palisa. Following Palisa's death in 1925, this asteroid was named for a "happy or contented mind"; qualities associated with the discoverer.

Photometric observations of this asteroid collected during 2010 show a rotation period of 10.052 ± 0.001 hours with a brightness variation of 0.65 ± 0.03 magnitude.
