= 275 Sapientia =

Main-belt asteroid

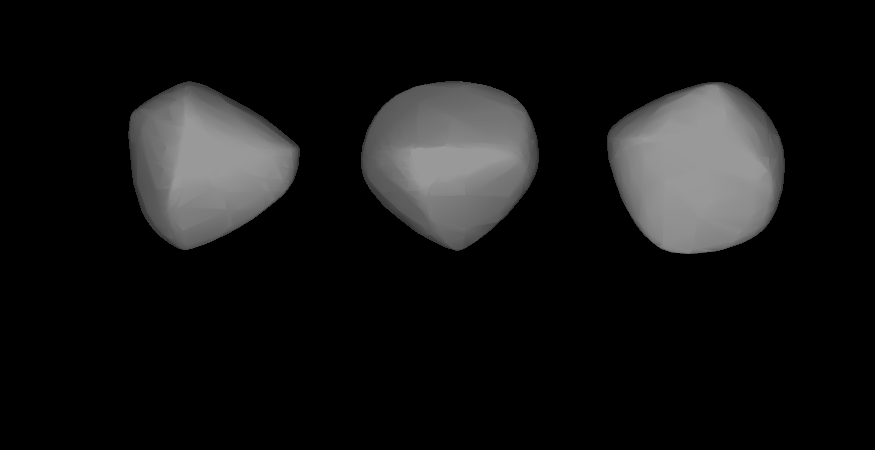
- Lightcurve-based 3D model of 275 Sapientia

Discovery
- Discovered by: Johann Palisa
- Discovery date: 15 April 1888

Designations
- Pronunciation: /seɪpiˈɛnʃə/
- Named after: Sapientia
- Alternative designations: A888 GB, 1906 AB; 1962 GE, 1962 HA
- Minor planet category: Main belt

Orbital characteristics
- Epoch 31 July 2016 (JD 2457600.5)
- Uncertainty parameter 0
- Observation arc: 124.23 yr (45374 d)
- Aphelion: 3.22294 AU (482.145 Gm)
- Perihelion: 2.31754 AU (346.699 Gm)
- Semi-major axis: 2.77024 AU (414.422 Gm)
- Eccentricity: 0.16342
- Orbital period (sidereal): 4.61 yr (1684.1 d)
- Mean anomaly: 300.952°
- Mean motion: 0° 12^{m} 49.54^{s} / day
- Inclination: 4.76416°
- Longitude of ascending node: 134.097°
- Argument of perihelion: 40.0578°

Physical characteristics
- Mean diameter: 100±1 km
- Mass: (1.18±0.19)×10^{18} kg (Note: Calculated from its standard gravitational parameter GM = 0.079±0.013 km^{3}/s^{2}.)
- Mean density: 2.27±0.39 g/cm^{3}
- Synodic rotation period: 14.93044 ± 0.00005 h (0.6221017 ± 2.1×10^{−6} d)
- Pole ecliptic longitude: 260° ± 7° 82° ± 8° (alternate)
- Pole ecliptic latitude: −1° ± 20° −11° ± 17° (alternate)
- Geometric albedo: 0.049 ± 0.009
- Spectral type: C
- Absolute magnitude (H): 9.06

275 Sapientia is a very large main belt asteroid. It was discovered by Austrian astronomer Johann Palisa on 15 April 1888 in Vienna. This object is named for the Roman personification of wisdom, Sophia.

This object is orbiting the Sun with a semi-major axis of 2.77 AU with an eccentricity of 0.16 and an orbital period of 4.61 years. The orbital period is inclined at an angle of 4.76° It is classified as a C-type asteroid and is probably composed of carbonaceous material.

Observations performed at the Palmer Divide Observatory in Colorado Springs, Colorado, during 2007 produced a light curve with an estimated period of 14.766±0.006 hours with a brightness range of 0.11±0.02 in magnitude. A 2014 study found a period of 14.931±0.001 hours with a variation of 0.12±0.01 in magnitude. The light curve was found to be irregular, suggesting the asteroid has an irregular shape. On September 30, 2015, the asteroid was observed occulting the 7th magnitude star HIP 14977 from multiple sites in Europe. The resulting chords showed a nearly circular prolate spheroid profile.
