= C/1879 Q1 (Palisa) =

Parabolic comet

Discovery
- Discovered by: Johann Palisa
- Discovery site: Pula, Croatia
- Discovery date: 21 August 1879

Designations
- Alternative designations: 1879d 1879 V

Orbital characteristics
- Epoch: 25 September 1879 (JD 2407617.5)
- Observation arc: 48 days
- Number of observations: 12
- Perihelion: 0.9895 AU
- Eccentricity: ~1.000
- Inclination: 77.12°
- Longitude of ascending node: 88.87°
- Argument of periapsis: 115.48°
- Last perihelion: 5 October 1879
- Earth MOID: 0.3021 AU
- Jupiter MOID: 0.8980 AU

Physical characteristics
- Comet total magnitude (M1): 8.0
- Apparent magnitude: 5.5 (1879 apparition)

Palisa's Comet, also known formally as C/1879 Q1 by its modern nomenclature, is a parabolic comet that was barely visible to the naked eye in late 1879. It was the only comet discovered by Austrian astronomer, Johann Palisa.

== Discovery and observations ==
Johann Palisa discovered this comet on 21 August 1879, initially mistaking it for a nebula not recorded in the catalogs of Messier and d'Arrest before confirming the object's motion a few hours later. At the time it was located within the constellation Ursa Major, (Note: Reported initial position upon discovery was: α = 10^{h} 02.4^{m} , δ = 49° 07′) where he described the comet as "round, small, but bright". One of the first ephemerides of the comet were calculated on 5 September.

The comet was moving inbound through the inner Solar System between September and October 1879, enabling further observations and refining orbital calculations. Pietro Tacchini measured the coma diameter as 1.7' on 7 October. Ralph Copeland described the comet as "bright and round" on October 19 while measuring the comet's spectra.
