= 569 Misa =

Main-belt asteroid

Discovery
- Discovered by: J. Palisa
- Discovery site: Vienna
- Discovery date: 27 July 1905

Designations
- Pronunciation: /ˈmaɪsə/
- Alternative designations: 1905 QT
- Minor planet category: main belt; Misa family

Orbital characteristics
- Epoch 31 July 2016 (JD 2457600.5)
- Uncertainty parameter 0
- Observation arc: 106.68 yr (38965 d)
- Aphelion: 3.1381 AU (469.45 Gm)
- Perihelion: 2.1756 AU (325.47 Gm)
- Semi-major axis: 2.6569 AU (397.47 Gm)
- Eccentricity: 0.18114
- Orbital period (sidereal): 4.33 yr (1581.8 d)
- Mean anomaly: 131.636°
- Mean motion: 0° 13^{m} 39.324^{s} / day
- Inclination: 1.2915°
- Longitude of ascending node: 301.720°
- Argument of perihelion: 142.950°

Physical characteristics
- Mean radius: 36.475±0.8 km
- Synodic rotation period: 13.52 h (0.563 d)
- Geometric albedo: 0.0297±0.001
- Absolute magnitude (H): 10.12

569 Misa is a minor planet orbiting the Sun.

Between 1998 and 2021, 569 Misa occulted five stars.
