= 278 Paulina =

Main-belt asteroid

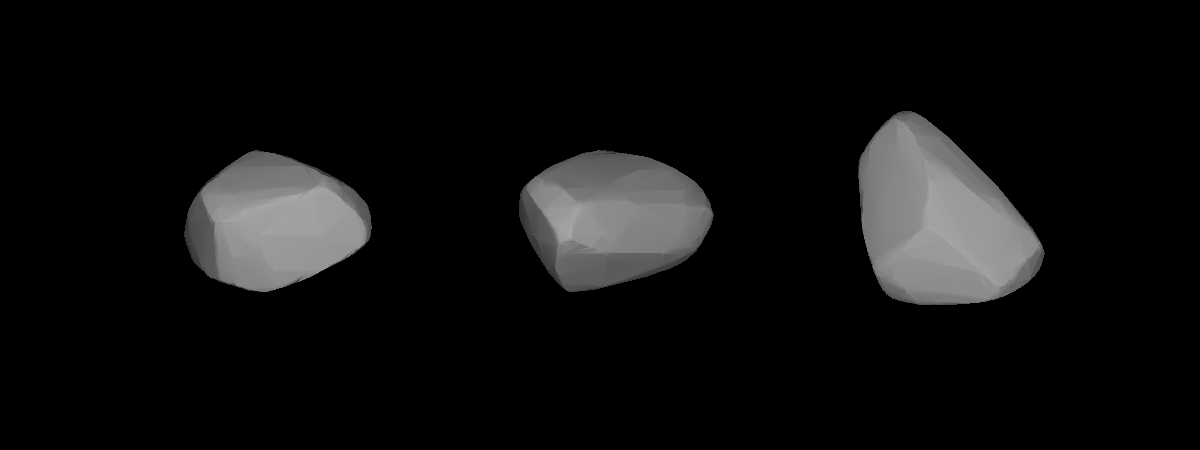
- A three-dimensional model of 278 Paulina based on its lightcurve

Discovery
- Discovered by: Johann Palisa
- Discovery date: 16 May 1888

Designations
- Pronunciation: /pɔːˈliːnə, -ˈlaɪnə/
- Alternative designations: A888 KA, 1959 XF
- Minor planet category: Main belt

Orbital characteristics
- Epoch 31 July 2016 (JD 2457600.5)
- Uncertainty parameter 0
- Observation arc: 125.42 yr (45811 d)
- Aphelion: 3.11948 AU (466.668 Gm)
- Perihelion: 2.39091 AU (357.675 Gm)
- Semi-major axis: 2.75519 AU (412.171 Gm)
- Eccentricity: 0.13222
- Orbital period (sidereal): 4.57 yr (1670.4 d)
- Mean anomaly: 44.8832°
- Mean motion: 0° 12^{m} 55.85^{s} / day
- Inclination: 7.81777°
- Longitude of ascending node: 62.0081°
- Argument of perihelion: 139.469°

Physical characteristics
- Dimensions: 35.01±1.6 km
- Synodic rotation period: 6.497 h (0.2707 d)
- Geometric albedo: 0.2505±0.024
- Absolute magnitude (H): 9.4

278 Paulina is a typical Main belt asteroid. It was discovered by Johann Palisa on 16 May 1888 in Vienna.
