= 257 Silesia =

Asteroid

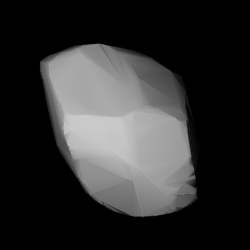
- Modelled shape of Silesia from its lightcurve

Discovery
- Discovered by: J. Palisa
- Discovery site: Vienna Observatory
- Discovery date: 5 April 1886

Designations
- Pronunciation: /saɪˈliːʃiə/
- Named after: Silesia (region)
- Alternative designations: A886 GB, 1929 DD; 1952 FL_{1}, 1952 HU
- Minor planet category: main-belt

Orbital characteristics
- Epoch 31 July 2016 (JD 2457600.5)
- Uncertainty parameter 0
- Observation arc: 129.94 yr (47462 d)
- Aphelion: 3.4669 AU (518.64 Gm)
- Perihelion: 2.7711 AU (414.55 Gm)
- Semi-major axis: 3.1190 AU (466.60 Gm)
- Eccentricity: 0.11154
- Orbital period (sidereal): 5.51 yr (2012.0 d)
- Mean anomaly: 30.606°
- Mean motion: 0° 10^{m} 44.148^{s} / day
- Inclination: 3.6351°
- Longitude of ascending node: 34.364°
- Argument of perihelion: 27.605°
- Earth MOID: 1.78299 AU (266.732 Gm)
- Jupiter MOID: 1.8503 AU (276.80 Gm)
- T_{Jupiter}: 3.204

Physical characteristics
- Dimensions: 72.66±2.2 km
- Mass: (9.0±3.7)×10^{17} kg (Note: Calculated from its standard gravitational parameter GM = 0.060±0.025 km^{3}/s^{2}.)
- Mean density: 4.45 g/cm^{3}
- Synodic rotation period: 15.7095 h (0.65456 d)
- Geometric albedo: 0.0545±0.003
- Spectral type: B–V = 0.761; U–B = 0.384; SCTU (Tholen); Ch (SMASS)
- Absolute magnitude (H): 9.47

257 Silesia is a large Main belt asteroid, about 73 kilometers in diameter. It was discovered by Johann Palisa on 5 April 1886 at Vienna Observatory, Austria.

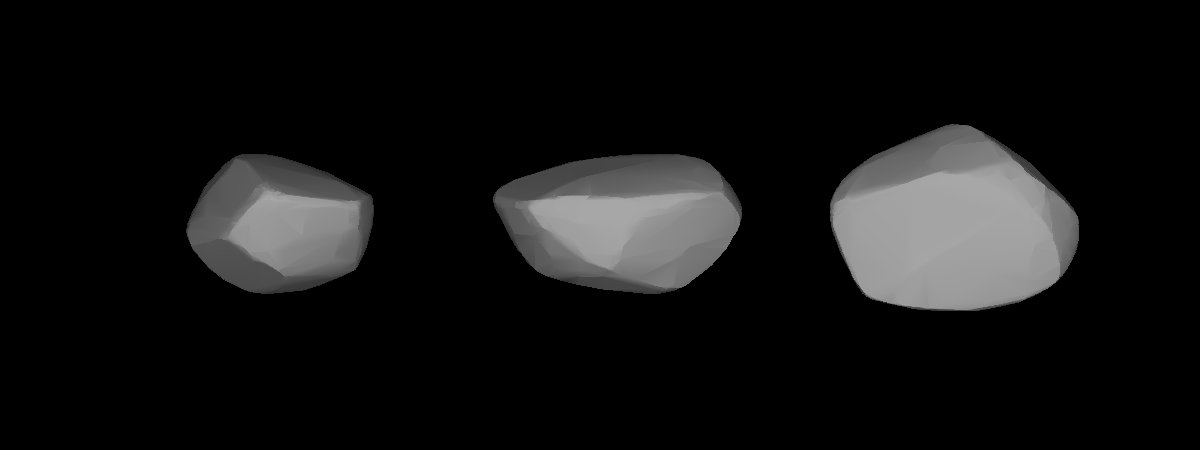
Light curve-based 3D-model of Silesia

It is named after Silesia, the province of the discoverer's birthplace (nowadays most of Silesia is in Poland, but Palisa's birthplace is in the small part of Silesia that is in the Czech Republic).
