= Johann Palisa =

Austrian astronomer (1848–1925)

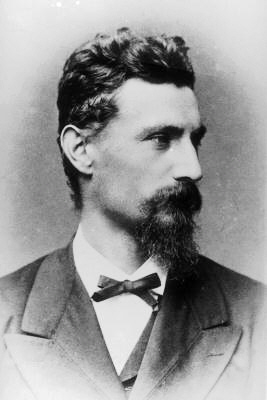
- Born: 6 December 1848; Troppau, Austrian Silesia, Austrian Empire
- Died: 2 May 1925 (aged 76); Vienna, Austria
- Education: University of Vienna
- Known for: asteroids
- Awards: Lalande Prize, 1876; Valz Prize, 1906
- Scientific career
- Fields: astronomy
- Workplaces: University of Vienna

Johann Palisa (6 December 1848 – 2 May 1925) was an Austrian astronomer. He was a prolific discoverer of asteroids, discovering 122 in all, from 136 Austria in 1874 to 1073 Gellivara in 1923. Some of his notable discoveries include 153 Hilda, 216 Kleopatra, 243 Ida, 253 Mathilde, 324 Bamberga, and the near-Earth asteroid 719 Albert. Palisa made his discoveries without the aid of photography, and he remains the most successful visual (non-photographic) asteroid discoverer of all time. He was awarded the Valz Prize from the French Academy of Sciences in 1906. The asteroid 914 Palisana, discovered by Max Wolf in 1919, and the lunar crater Palisa were named in his honour.

== Biography ==
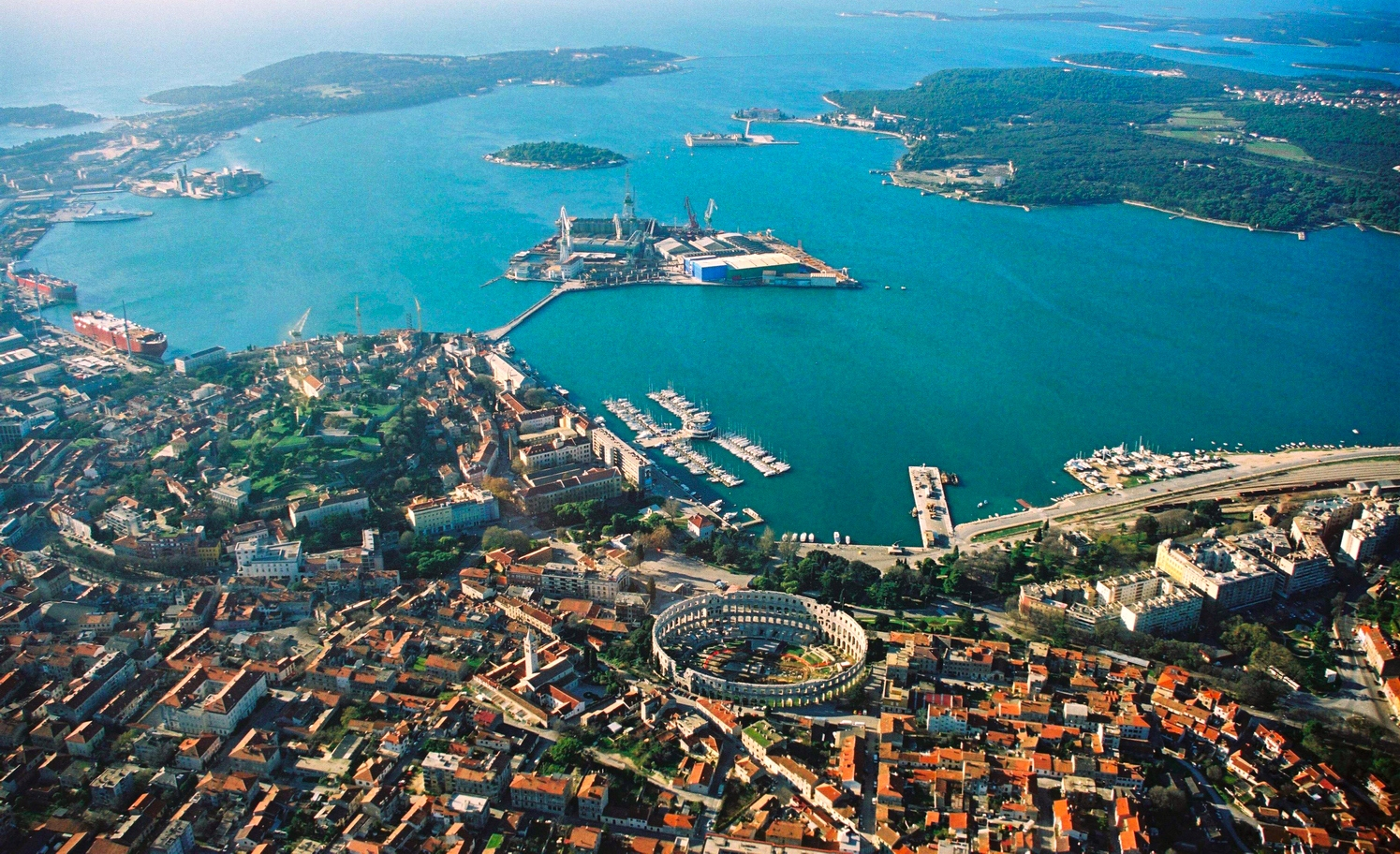
A view of the City of Pula

Palisa was born on 6 December 1848, in Troppau in Austrian Silesia (now called Opava and located in the Czech Republic). From 1866 to 1870, Palisa studied mathematics and astronomy at the University of Vienna; however, he did not graduate until 1884. Despite this, by 1870 he was an assistant at the university's observatory, and a year later gained a position at the observatory in Geneva. A few years later, in 1872, at the age of 24, Palisa became the director of the Austrian Naval Observatory in Pula. While at Pula, he discovered his first asteroid, 136 Austria, on 18 March 1874. Along with this, he discovered twenty-seven minor planets and one comet. During his stay in Pula he used a small six-inch refractor telescope to aid in his research.

Palisa became director of the Pula observatory, with the rank of commander, until 1880. In 1880 Palisa moved to the new Vienna Observatory. While at the observatory he discovered 94 comets by visual means.

In 1883 he joined a French expedition to Caroline Island to observe the Solar eclipse of 6 May 1883. During the expedition, he joined to observations for the search for the hypothetical planet Vulcan, as well as collecting samples of insects for the Vienna Museum of Natural History. In memory of this expedition, he named the asteroid 235 Carolina after Caroline Island.

In 1885, Palisa offered to sell the naming rights of some of the minor planets he discovered, in order to fund his travels to observe the Solar eclipse of 29 August 1886. However he sold just a small number of these naming rights and apparently did not go.

Palisa and Max Wolf worked together to create the first star atlas created by photographic plates, the Palisa–Wolf Sternkarten, also known as the Palisa-Wolf-Star-Maps, published in 1899, 1902, 1908. In 1908, Palisa published the Sternenlexikon, mapping the skies from declinations −1° to +19°. That same year, he became the vice director of the Vienna Observatory. He retired from administrative duties in 1919, but kept observation rights. Palisa continued to discover asteroids until 1923. He died on 2 May 1925.

== Discoveries ==
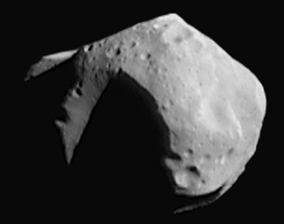
253 Mathilde as seen by NEAR

Between 1874 and 1923 Palisa discovered 122 asteroids ranging from 136 Austria to 1073 Gellivara and the much later numbered Mars-crosser 14309 Defoy, respectively (see table below). He made his discoveries at the Austrian Naval Observatory at Pola (538) and at the Vienna Observatory. He also discovered the parabolic comet C/1879 Q1 in August 1879.

One of his discoveries was 253 Mathilde, a 50-kilometer sized C-type asteroid in the intermediate asteroid belt, which was visited by the NEAR Shoemaker spacecraft on 27 June 1997. The robotic probe passed within 1200 km of Mathilde at 12:56 UT at 9.93 km/s, returning imaging and other instrument data including over 500 images which covered 60% of Mathilde's surface. Only a small number of minor planets have been visited by spacecraft.

Palisa made all of his asteroid discoveries visually. Even though Max Wolf had revolutionised the process of asteroid discovery by introducing photography in the 1890s, Palisa continued to trust on visual observations. His final discovery, 1073 Gellivara, was the last asteroid that was found visually. Johann Palisa remains the most successful visual (non-photographic) asteroid discoverer of all time.

It should also take 73 years after the last asteroid discovery of 1073 Gellivara until the next minor planet 9097 Davidschlag was discovered by Austrian amateur astronomers Erich Meyer, Erwin Obermair und Herbert Raab.

136 Austria	18 March 1874	list
137 Meliboea	21 April 1874	list
140 Siwa	13 October 1874	list
142 Polana	28 January 1875	list
143 Adria	23 February 1875	list
151 Abundantia	1 November 1875	list
153 Hilda	2 November 1875	list
155 Scylla	8 November 1875	list
156 Xanthippe	22 November 1875	list
178 Belisana	6 November 1877	list

182 Elsa	7 February 1878	list
183 Istria	8 February 1878	list
184 Dejopeja	28 February 1878	list
192 Nausikaa	17 February 1879	list
195 Eurykleia	19 April 1879	list
197 Arete	21 May 1879	list
201 Penelope	7 August 1879	list
204 Kallisto	8 October 1879	list
205 Martha	13 October 1879	list
207 Hedda	17 October 1879	list

208 Lacrimosa	21 October 1879	list
210 Isabella	12 November 1879	list
211 Isolda	10 December 1879	list
212 Medea	6 February 1880	list
214 Aschera	29 February 1880	list
216 Kleopatra	10 April 1880	list
218 Bianca	4 September 1880	list
219 Thusnelda	30 September 1880	list
220 Stephania	19 May 1881	list
221 Eos	18 January 1882	list

222 Lucia	9 February 1882	list
223 Rosa	9 March 1882	list
224 Oceana	30 March 1882	list
225 Henrietta	19 April 1882	list
226 Weringia	19 July 1882	list
228 Agathe	19 August 1882	list
229 Adelinda	22 August 1882	list
231 Vindobona	10 September 1882	list
232 Russia	31 January 1883	list
235 Carolina	28 November 1883	list

236 Honoria	26 April 1884	list
237 Coelestina	27 June 1884	list
239 Adrastea	18 August 1884	list
242 Kriemhild	22 September 1884	list
243 Ida	29 September 1884	list
244 Sita	14 October 1884	list
248 Lameia	5 June 1885	list
250 Bettina	3 September 1885	list
251 Sophia	4 October 1885	list
253 Mathilde	12 November 1885	list

254 Augusta	31 March 1886	list
255 Oppavia	31 March 1886	list
256 Walpurga	3 April 1886	list
257 Silesia	5 April 1886	list
260 Huberta	3 October 1886	list
262 Valda	3 November 1886	list
263 Dresda	3 November 1886	list
265 Anna	25 February 1887	list
266 Aline	17 May 1887	list
269 Justitia	21 September 1887	list

273 Atropos	8 March 1888	list
274 Philagoria	3 April 1888	list
275 Sapientia	15 April 1888	list
276 Adelheid	17 April 1888	list
278 Paulina	16 May 1888	list
279 Thule	25 October 1888	list
280 Philia	29 October 1888	list
281 Lucretia	31 October 1888	list
286 Iclea	3 August 1889	list
290 Bruna	20 March 1890	list

291 Alice	25 April 1890	list
292 Ludovica	25 April 1890	list
295 Theresia	17 August 1890	list
299 Thora	6 October 1890	list
301 Bavaria	16 November 1890	list
304 Olga	14 February 1891	list
309 Fraternitas	6 April 1891	list
313 Chaldaea	30 August 1891	list
315 Constantia	4 September 1891	list
320 Katharina	11 October 1891	list

321 Florentina	15 October 1891	list
324 Bamberga	25 February 1892	list
326 Tamara	19 March 1892	list
569 Misa	27 July 1905	list
583 Klotilde	31 December 1905	list
652 Jubilatrix	4 November 1907	list
671 Carnegia	21 September 1908	list
687 Tinette	16 August 1909	list
688 Melanie	25 August 1909	list
689 Zita	12 September 1909	list

703 Noëmi	3 October 1910	list
710 Gertrud	28 February 1911	list
711 Marmulla	1 March 1911	list
716 Berkeley	30 July 1911	list
718 Erida	29 September 1911	list
719 Albert	3 October 1911	list
722 Frieda	18 October 1911	list
723 Hammonia	21 October 1911	list
724 Hapag	21 October 1911	list
725 Amanda	21 October 1911	list

728 Leonisis	16 February 1912	list
730 Athanasia	10 April 1912	list
734 Benda	11 October 1912	list
750 Oskar	28 April 1913	list
782 Montefiore	18 March 1914	list
783 Nora	18 March 1914	list
794 Irenaea	27 August 1914	list
795 Fini	26 September 1914	list
803 Picka	21 March 1915	list
827 Wolfiana	29 August 1916	list

828 Lindemannia	29 August 1916	list
867 Kovacia	25 February 1917	list
876 Scott	20 June 1917	list
902 Probitas	3 September 1918	list
903 Nealley	13 September 1918	list
932 Hooveria	23 March 1920	list
941 Murray	10 October 1920	list
964 Subamara	27 October 1921	list
975 Perseverantia	27 March 1922	list
996 Hilaritas	21 March 1923	list

1073 Gellivara	14 September 1923	list
14309 Defoy	22 September 1908	list

== Family ==
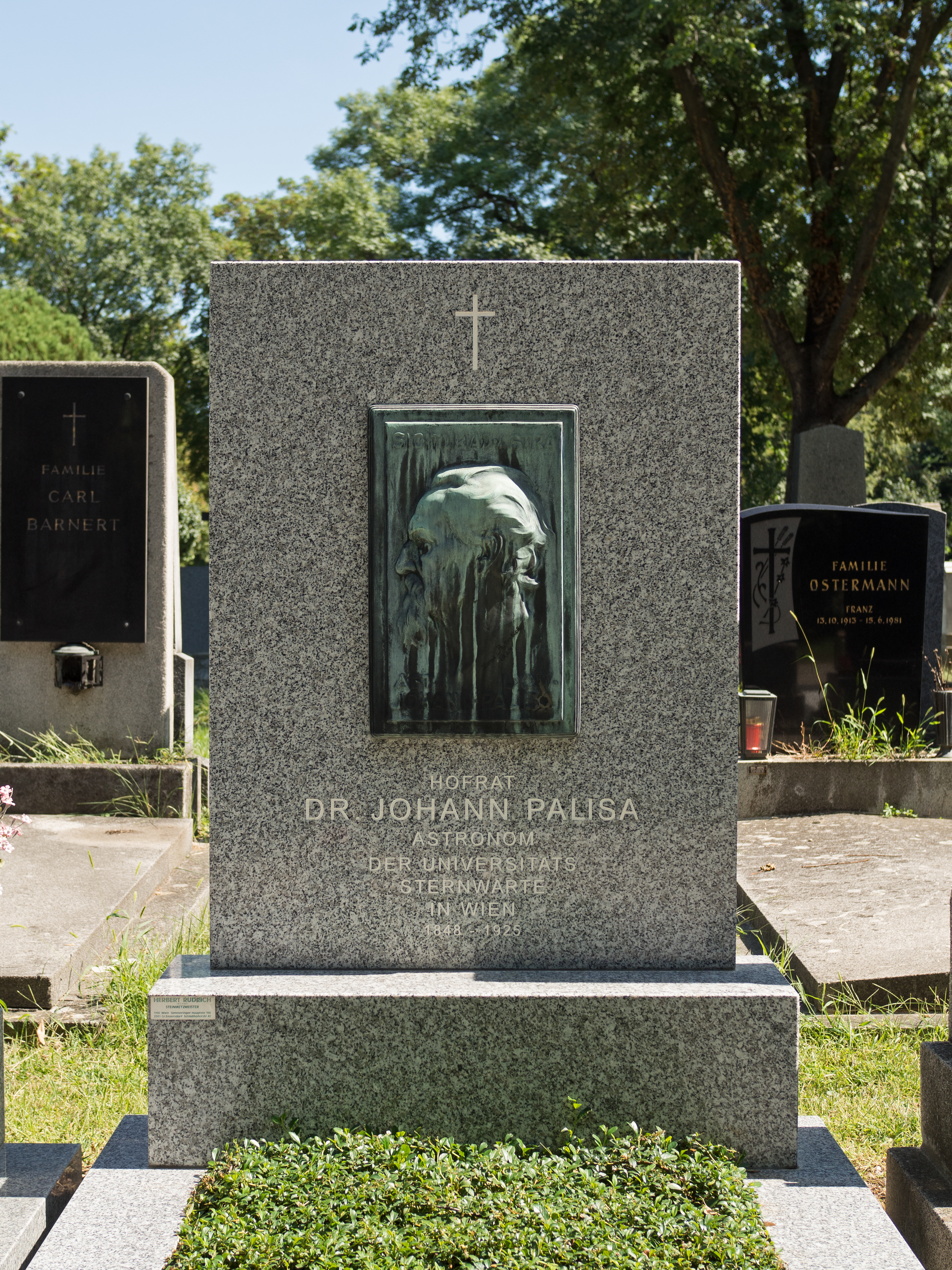
Grave of the astronomer Johann Palisa at the Vienna Central Cemetery

Palisa married his second wife, Anna Benda, in 1902. Asteroid 734 Benda is named after her. He also named minor planets after other members of his family: 320 Katharina after his mother, Katherina, 321 Florentina for his daughter Florentine.

His granddaughter was Gertrud Rheden, wife of astronomer Joseph Rheden. Asteroid 710 Gertrud is named after her.

== Honors and awards ==
In 1876 Palisa was awarded the Lalande Prize.

Palisa was awarded the Valz Prize from the French Academy of Sciences in 1906.

The Phocaea main-belt asteroid 914 Palisana, discovered by Max Wolf in 1919, and the lunar crater Palisa were named in his honour. Minor planets 902 Probitas, 975 Perseverantia, and 996 Hilaritas that he discovered were given names after his death for traits qualities associated with him: adherence to the highest principles and ideals, perseverance and happy or contented mind. Names were given by Joseph Rheden with the support of Palisa's second wife, Anna.

Minor planet 1152 Pawona is named after both Johann Palisa and Max Wolf, in recognition of their cooperation. The name was proposed by Swedish astronomer Bror Ansgar Asplind. Pawona is a combination of "Palisa" and "Wolf" (Pa, Wo) joined with a Latin feminine suffix.
