= 301 Bavaria =

Main-belt asteroid

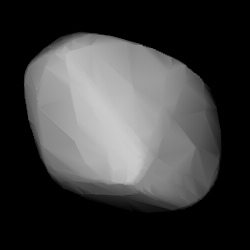
- Modelled shape of Bavaria from its lightcurve

Discovery
- Discovered by: Johann Palisa
- Discovery date: 16 November 1890

Designations
- Pronunciation: /bəˈvɛəriə/
- Named after: Bavaria
- Alternative designations: A890 WA; 1928 DH_{1} 1951 FD; 1952 OF
- Minor planet category: main-belt

Orbital characteristics
- Epoch 31 July 2016 (JD 2457600.5)
- Uncertainty parameter 0
- Observation arc: 117.42 yr (42888 d)
- Aphelion: 2.90693 AU (434.871 Gm)
- Perihelion: 2.54364 AU (380.523 Gm)
- Semi-major axis: 2.72528 AU (407.696 Gm)
- Eccentricity: 0.066652
- Orbital period (sidereal): 4.50 yr (1643.3 d)
- Mean anomaly: 115.993°
- Mean motion: 0° 13^{m} 8.659^{s} / day
- Inclination: 4.89466°
- Longitude of ascending node: 142.374°
- Argument of perihelion: 125.469°

Physical characteristics
- Dimensions: 54.32±3.3 km
- Mass: (2.8±1.0)×10^{17} kg (Note: Calculated from its standard gravitational parameter GM = 0.019±0.007 km^{3}/s^{2}.)
- Mean density: 3.74 g/cm^{3} (Note: Assuming a diameter of 53 km.)
- Synodic rotation period: 12.253 h (0.5105 d)
- Geometric albedo: 0.0546±0.007
- Absolute magnitude (H): 10.3

301 Bavaria is a carbonaceous background asteroid from the intermediate asteroid belt, approximately 53 kilometers (33 miles) in diameter. It was discovered by Johann Palisa on 16 November 1890 in Vienna.

301 Bavaria is classified as a carbonaceous C-type asteroid. It is spinning with a rotation period of 12.24 h.
