= 255 Oppavia =

Main-belt asteroid

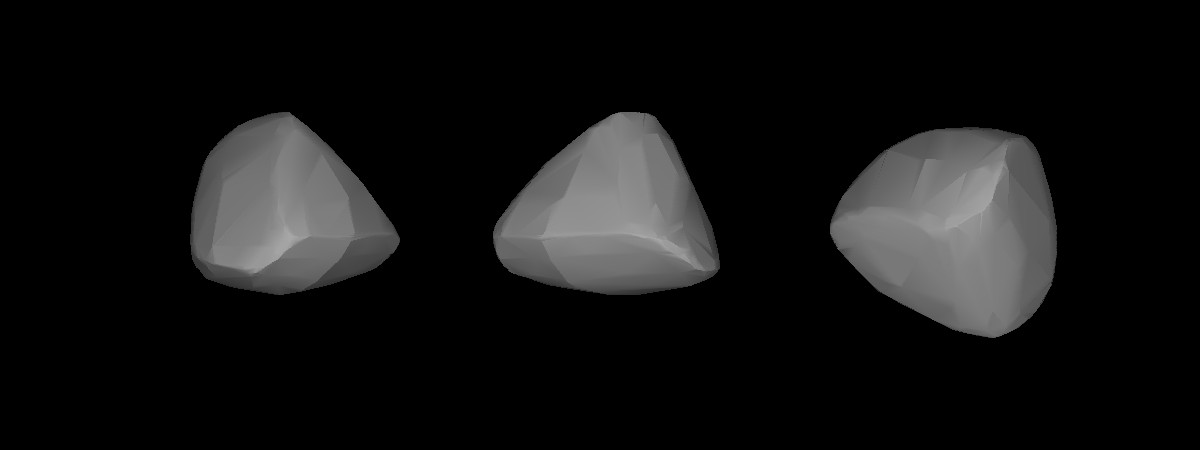
- Lightcurve-based 3D model of 255 Oppavia

Discovery
- Discovered by: Johann Palisa
- Discovery date: 31 March 1886

Designations
- Pronunciation: /ɒˈpeɪviə/
- Named after: Opava
- Alternative designations: A886 FB, 1904 EC; 1924 TA, 1938 VC; 1938 XC, 1945 GD; 1951 SG
- Minor planet category: Main belt

Orbital characteristics
- Epoch 31 July 2016 (JD 2457600.5)
- Uncertainty parameter 0
- Observation arc: 129.86 yr (47,431 d)
- Aphelion: 2.959 AU (442.6 Gm)
- Perihelion: 2.533 AU (379.0 Gm)
- Semi-major axis: 2.746 AU (410.8 Gm)
- Eccentricity: 0.077427
- Orbital period (sidereal): 4.551 yr (1,662.1 d)
- Average orbital speed: 17.98 km/s
- Mean anomaly: 261.139°
- Mean motion: 0° 12^{m} 59.735^{s} / day
- Inclination: 9.47209°
- Longitude of ascending node: 13.6708°
- Argument of perihelion: 156.011°

Physical characteristics
- Dimensions: 57.40±1.5 km
- Mass: (7.5±2.2)×10^{17} kg (Note: Calculated from its standard gravitational parameter GM = 0.050±0.015 km^{3}/s^{2}.)
- Mean density: 7.80 g/cm^{3} (Note: Assuming a diameter of 56.9 km.)
- Synodic rotation period: 19.499 h (0.8125 d)
- Geometric albedo: 0.0374±0.002
- Spectral type: X
- Absolute magnitude (H): 10.39

255 Oppavia is a sizeable Main belt asteroid. It was discovered by Austrian astronomer Johann Palisa on 31 March 1886 in Vienna and was named after Opava, a town in the Czech Republic, then part of Austria-Hungary, where Palisa was born. It is orbiting the Sun at a distance of 2.75 AU with an orbital eccentricity (ovalness) of 0.077 and a period of 4.55 yr. The orbital plane is inclined by an angle of 9.47° to the plane of the ecliptic.

Photometric observations made during 2013 indicate a synodic rotation period of 19.499±0.001 h with an amplitude of 0.16±0.02 in magnitude. The unusual light curve shows three uneven minima and maxima per cycle. In 1995, 255 Oppavia was suggested as a peripheral member of the now defunct Ceres asteroid family, but was found to be an unrelated interloper on the basis of its non-matching spectral type. It classified as a dark X-type asteroid in the Tholen taxonomy.
