= 750 Oskar =

Main-belt asteroid

Discovery
- Discovered by: J. Palisa
- Discovery site: Vienna
- Discovery date: 28 April 1913

Designations
- Alternative designations: 1913 RG

Orbital characteristics
- Epoch 31 July 2016 (JD 2457600.5)
- Uncertainty parameter 0
- Observation arc: 102.86 yr (37571 d)
- Aphelion: 2.7598 AU (412.86 Gm)
- Perihelion: 2.1286 AU (318.43 Gm)
- Semi-major axis: 2.4442 AU (365.65 Gm)
- Eccentricity: 0.12912
- Orbital period (sidereal): 3.82 yr (1395.7 d)
- Mean anomaly: 73.9970°
- Mean motion: 0° 15^{m} 28.548^{s} / day
- Inclination: 3.9510°
- Longitude of ascending node: 69.710°
- Argument of perihelion: 72.156°
- Earth MOID: 1.14424 AU (171.176 Gm)
- Jupiter MOID: 2.26326 AU (338.579 Gm)
- T_{Jupiter}: 3.485

Physical characteristics
- Mean radius: 10.285±0.7 km
- Synodic rotation period: 6.2584 h (0.26077 d)
- Geometric albedo: 0.0587±0.009
- Absolute magnitude (H): 12.13

750 Oskar is a minor planet, specifically an asteroid orbiting in the asteroid belt that was discovered by Johann Palisa on 28 April 1913 in Vienna. Photometric observations made in 2012 at the Organ Mesa Observatory in Las Cruces, New Mexico, produced a light curve with a period of 6.2584 ± 0.0002 hours and a brightness variation of 0.21 ± 0.02 in magnitude.

Dust activity due to sublimation has been detected on this asteroid, suggesting the presence of water ice in its interior.
