= 689 Zita =

Main-belt asteroid

Discovery
- Discovered by: J. Palisa
- Discovery site: Vienna
- Discovery date: 12 September 1909

Designations
- Alternative designations: 1909 HJ

Orbital characteristics
- Epoch 31 July 2016 (JD 2457600.5)
- Uncertainty parameter 0
- Observation arc: 60.38 yr (22054 d)
- Aphelion: 2.8480 AU (426.05 Gm)
- Perihelion: 1.7830 AU (266.73 Gm)
- Semi-major axis: 2.3155 AU (346.39 Gm)
- Eccentricity: 0.22997
- Orbital period (sidereal): 3.52 yr (1287.0 d)
- Mean anomaly: 117.31°
- Mean motion: 0° 16^{m} 46.992^{s} / day
- Inclination: 5.7445°
- Longitude of ascending node: 168.175°
- Argument of perihelion: 188.158°

Physical characteristics
- Mean radius: 7.18±0.3 km
- Synodic rotation period: 6.425 h (0.2677 d)
- Geometric albedo: 0.1183±0.011
- Absolute magnitude (H): 12.15

689 Zita is a minor planet orbiting the Sun. It was named after Zita of Bourbon-Parma, the last empress of Austria-Hungary.
