= 315 Constantia =

Main-belt asteroid

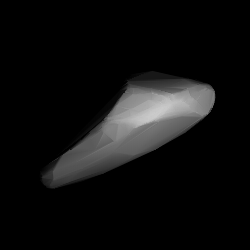
- Shape model of Constantia from its lightcurve

Discovery
- Discovered by: Johann Palisa
- Discovery date: 4 September 1891

Designations
- Pronunciation: /kənˈstænʃ(i)ə/
- Named after: constancy (virtue)
- Minor planet category: main-belt

Orbital characteristics
- Epoch 31 July 2016 (JD 2457600.5)
- Uncertainty parameter 0
- Observation arc: 87.27 yr (31874 d)
- Aphelion: 2.61963 AU (391.891 Gm)
- Perihelion: 1.86231 AU (278.598 Gm)
- Semi-major axis: 2.24097 AU (335.244 Gm)
- Eccentricity: 0.16897
- Orbital period (sidereal): 3.35 yr (1225.3 d)
- Average orbital speed: 19.9 km/s
- Mean anomaly: 86.6748°
- Mean motion: 0° 17^{m} 37.673^{s} / day
- Inclination: 2.42916°
- Longitude of ascending node: 161.661°
- Argument of perihelion: 172.807°

Physical characteristics
- Dimensions: 5 - 12 km
- Synodic rotation period: 5.345 h (0.2227 d)
- Absolute magnitude (H): 12.5

315 Constantia is a stony background asteroid from the inner region of the asteroid belt, approximately 6.5 kilometers (4 miles) in diameter. It was discovered by Austrian astronomer Johann Palisa at the Vienna Observatory on 4 September 1891. The asteroid is a member of the Flora family. It is spinning with a rotation period of 5.345±0.003 h and shows a brightness variation of 0.57±0.2 in magnitude.
