= 232 Russia =

Main-belt asteroid

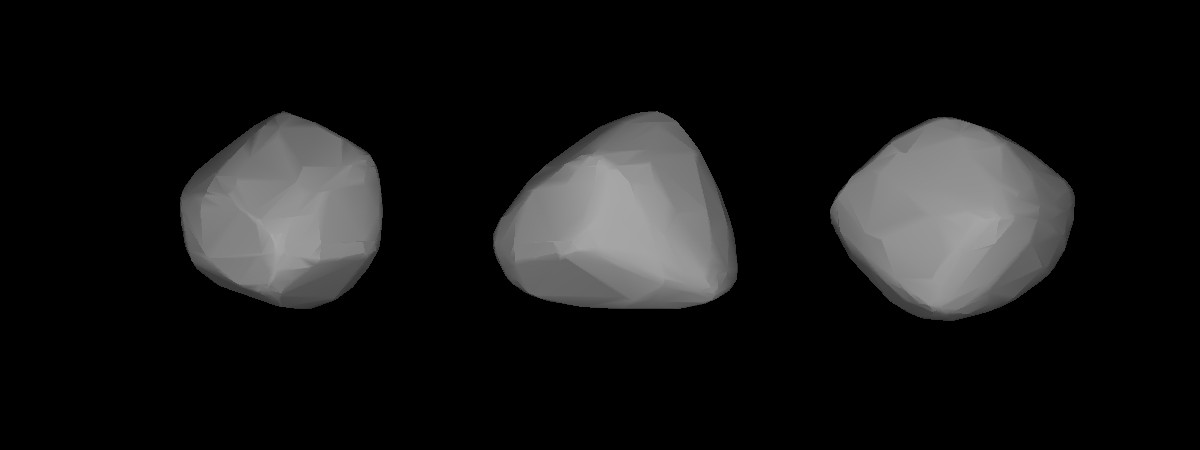
- Lightcurve-based 3D model of 232 Russia

Discovery
- Discovered by: Johann Palisa
- Discovery date: 31 January 1883

Designations
- Named after: Russia
- Alternative designations: A883 BA, 1921 UA; 1929 QA, 1954 SV; 1970 SN_{1}
- Minor planet category: Main belt

Orbital characteristics
- Epoch 31 July 2016 (JD 2457600.5)
- Uncertainty parameter 0
- Observation arc: 102.35 yr (37382 d)
- Aphelion: 2.9986 AU (448.58 Gm)
- Perihelion: 2.1069 AU (315.19 Gm)
- Semi-major axis: 2.5527 AU (381.88 Gm)
- Eccentricity: 0.17465
- Orbital period (sidereal): 4.08 yr (1489.7 d)
- Average orbital speed: 18.65 km/s
- Mean anomaly: 213.685°
- Mean motion: 0° 14^{m} 29.976^{s} / day
- Inclination: 6.0659°
- Longitude of ascending node: 152.250°
- Argument of perihelion: 52.163°

Physical characteristics
- Dimensions: 53.28±1.1 km
- Synodic rotation period: 21.905 h (0.9127 d)
- Geometric albedo: 0.0494±0.002
- Spectral type: C
- Absolute magnitude (H): 10.25

232 Russia is a large Main belt asteroid. It is classified as a C-type asteroid and is probably composed of primitive carbonaceous material. It was discovered by Johann Palisa on 31 January 1883 in Vienna, who named it after the country of Russia.

Photometric observations of this asteroid collected during 2007 show a rotation period of 21.8 ± 0.2 hours with a brightness variation of 0.2 ± 0.02 magnitude. A follow-up study during 2014 discovered that the rotation period varied depending on the phase angle of observation. The measured rotation varied from 22.016 ± 0.004 hours at a phase angle of 21.5 degrees to 17.0, to 21.904 ± 0.002 hours at phase angles between 5.2 degrees and 9.6 degrees. The reason for this variation has to do with the shape of the asteroid.
