= Palisa-Wolf-Star Map =

Star map

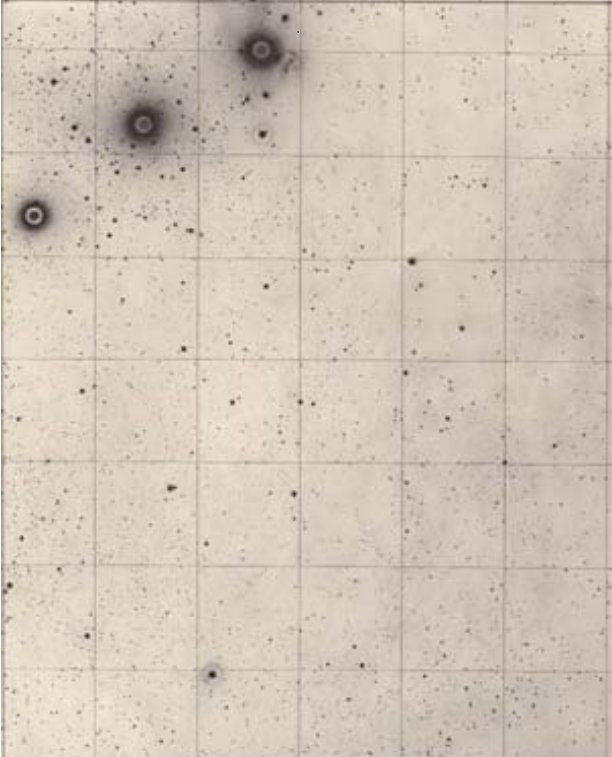
Palisa-Wolf-Sternatlas - picture in the star constellation Orion

The Palisa-Wolf-Star Map or Palisa-Wolf-Star Atlas (German: Palisa-Wolf-Sternatlas) is a map series produced between 1900 and 1916 as well as published between 1900 and 1931, which shows the entire starry sky visible in Europe in 210 large-scale sheets.

It was published at the suggestion of the Viennese astronomer Johann Palisa (1848–1925) together with his younger colleague Max Wolf in Heidelberg to facilitate the discovery and tracking of new asteroids. At that time, Palisa had already discovered about 100 of these minor planets through visual observation at the large refractor of the University Observatory in Vienna, while Wolf was the first researcher to use astrophotography for this purpose at the new Heidelberg-Königstuhl State Observatory. The 210 star charts in the format 11 by 9 inches were recorded in Heidelberg and systematically cut out according to celestial coordinates.

Palisa was not only concerned with facilitating the discovery of the many minor planets to be expected, but also with the possibility of finding "lost" asteroids again and thereby determining their orbits more precisely. The star atlas became an important tool for planetoid researchers for several decades.

What is also remarkable about this work is that two astronomers competing in their field of research were able to decide to cooperate. The "photo pioneer" Wolf surpassed Palisa in the number of discovered asteroids (123 or more than 200) in the following decade, because these small bodies quickly revealed themselves in the sky photographs by a short line trace, while Palisa had to find them at the telescope by comparing them with the star chart.
