= 295 Theresia =

Main-belt asteroid

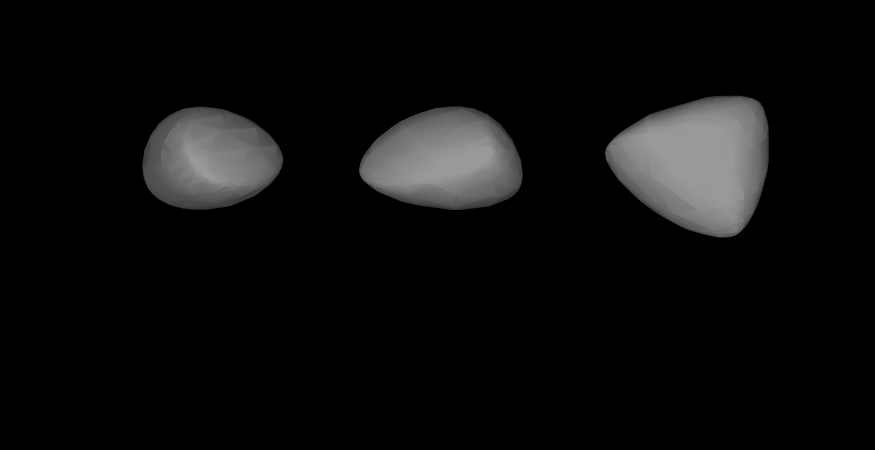
- Lightcurve-based 3D model of 295 Theresia

Discovery
- Discovered by: Johann Palisa
- Discovery date: 17 August 1890

Designations
- Named after: Unknown
- Alternative designations: A890 QA
- Minor planet category: Main belt

Orbital characteristics
- Epoch 31 July 2016 (JD 2457600.5)
- Uncertainty parameter 0
- Observation arc: 116.73 yr (42635 d)
- Aphelion: 3.27560 AU (490.023 Gm)
- Perihelion: 2.31460 AU (346.259 Gm)
- Semi-major axis: 2.79510 AU (418.141 Gm)
- Eccentricity: 0.17191
- Orbital period (sidereal): 4.67 yr (1706.8 d)
- Mean anomaly: 266.698°
- Mean motion: 0° 12^{m} 39.294^{s} / day
- Inclination: 2.70824°
- Longitude of ascending node: 276.055°
- Argument of perihelion: 148.036°

Physical characteristics
- Dimensions: 27.72±1.9 km
- Synodic rotation period: 10.730 h (0.4471 d)
- Geometric albedo: 0.1930±0.029
- Temperature: unknown
- Absolute magnitude (H): 10.19

295 Theresia is a typical Main belt asteroid. It was discovered by Johann Palisa on 17 August 1890 in Vienna.
