= 710 Gertrud =

Main-belt asteroid

Discovery
- Discovered by: J. Palisa
- Discovery site: Vienna Obs.
- Discovery date: 28 February 1911

Designations
- Alternative designations: 1911 LM

Orbital characteristics
- Epoch 31 July 2016 (JD 2457600.5)
- Uncertainty parameter 0
- Observation arc: 105.01 yr (38355 d)
- Aphelion: 3.5537 AU (531.63 Gm)
- Perihelion: 2.7105 AU (405.49 Gm)
- Semi-major axis: 3.1321 AU (468.56 Gm)
- Eccentricity: 0.13461
- Orbital period (sidereal): 5.54 yr (2024.7 d)
- Mean anomaly: 303.093°
- Mean motion: 0° 10^{m} 40.116^{s} / day
- Inclination: 1.7508°
- Longitude of ascending node: 140.193°
- Argument of perihelion: 99.5550°

Physical characteristics
- Mean radius: 13.405±0.75 km
- Synodic rotation period: 8.288 h (0.3453 d)
- Geometric albedo: 0.0893±0.011
- Absolute magnitude (H): 11.1

710 Gertrud is a Themistian asteroid, which means it is a member of the Themis family of asteroids. It was discovered by Austrian astronomer Johann Palisa on 28 February 1911 from Vienna.
