= 197 Arete =

Main-belt asteroid

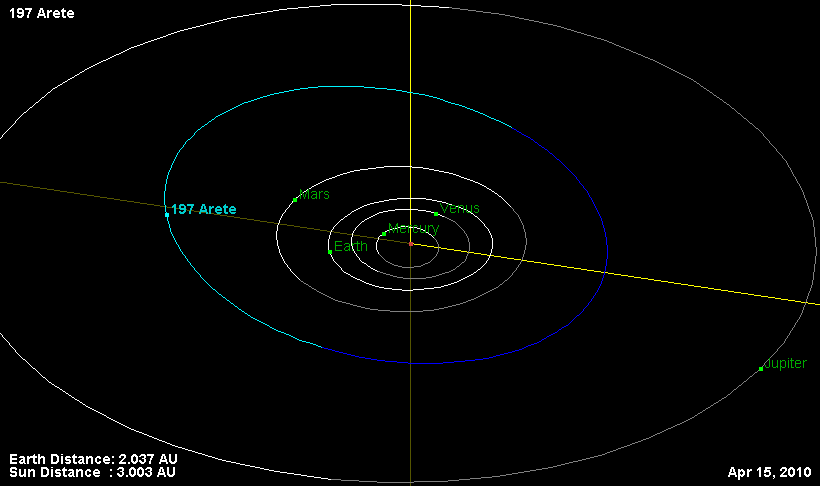
- Orbital diagram

Discovery
- Discovered by: Johann Palisa
- Discovery date: 21 May 1879

Designations
- Pronunciation: /əˈriːtiː/
- Named after: Arete
- Alternative designations: A879 KA; 1934 RE_{1}; 1950 DY
- Minor planet category: Asteroid belt

Orbital characteristics
- Epoch 31 July 2016 (JD 2457600.5)
- Uncertainty parameter 0
- Observation arc: 136.89 yr (50000 d)
- Aphelion: 3.1882283 AU (476.95216 Gm) (Q)
- Perihelion: 2.2897600 AU (342.54322 Gm) (q)
- Semi-major axis: 2.7389941 AU (409.74769 Gm) (a)
- Eccentricity: 0.1640143 (e)
- Orbital period (sidereal): 4.53 yr (1655.7 d)
- Mean anomaly: 20.361539° (M)
- Mean motion: 0° 13^{m} 2.744^{s} / day (n)
- Inclination: 8.793773° (i)
- Longitude of ascending node: 81.607160° (Ω)
- Argument of perihelion: 246.46589° (ω)
- Earth MOID: 1.29448 AU (193.651 Gm)
- Jupiter MOID: 2.16829 AU (324.372 Gm)
- T_{Jupiter}: 3.314

Physical characteristics
- Dimensions: 29.18±2.4 km
- Synodic rotation period: 6.6084 h (0.27535 d); 6.54 h
- Geometric albedo: 0.4417±0.083; 0.442
- Spectral type: S
- Absolute magnitude (H): 9.18

197 Arete is an asteroid in the asteroid belt. It has a very bright surface, even so when compared to other rocky S-type asteroid.

It was discovered by J. Palisa on May 21, 1879, and named after Arete, the mother of Nausicaa in Homer's The Odyssey. Every 18 years, this asteroid approaches within 0.04 AU of 4 Vesta. During these encounters, Vesta causes a gravitational perturbation of Arete, allowing the mass of Vesta to be directly determined.

Photometric observations during 1984 showed a rotation period of 6.54 ± 0.02 hours and a brightness variation of 0.10 ± 0.01 in magnitude. The light curve shows "four well defined extrema with two asymmetric maxima".
