= 222 Lucia =

Main-belt asteroid

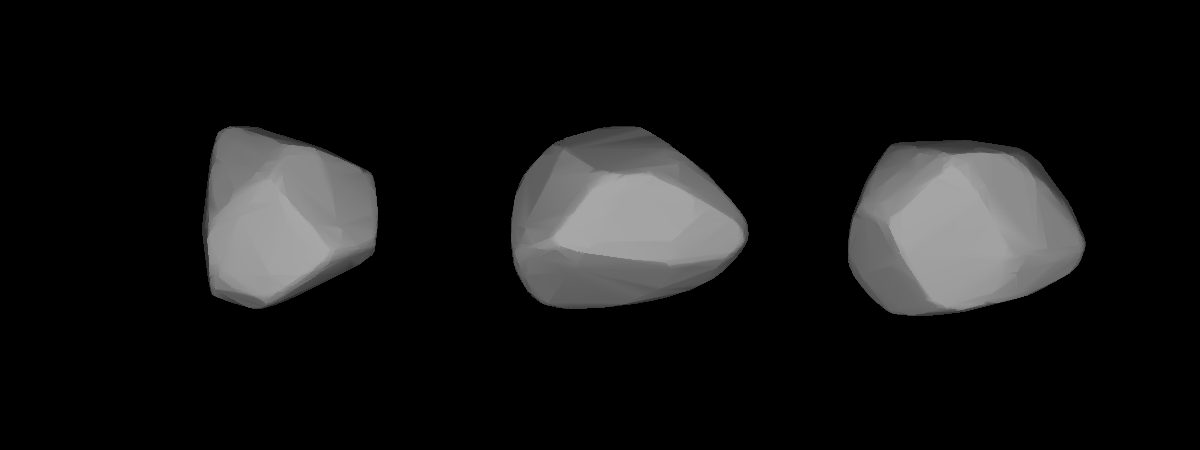
- A three-dimensional model of 222 Lucia based on its lightcurve

Discovery
- Discovered by: Johann Palisa
- Discovery date: 9 February 1882

Designations
- Pronunciation: /ˈluːʃiə/ German: [ˈluːtsiɐ]
- Alternative designations: A882 CA, 1899 EC; 1919 AB
- Minor planet category: Main belt (Themis)

Orbital characteristics
- Epoch 31 July 2016 (JD 2457600.5)
- Uncertainty parameter 0
- Observation arc: 117.10 yr (42769 d)
- Aphelion: 3.5529 AU (531.51 Gm)
- Perihelion: 2.7296 AU (408.34 Gm)
- Semi-major axis: 3.1412 AU (469.92 Gm)
- Eccentricity: 0.13105
- Orbital period (sidereal): 5.57 yr (2033.5 d)
- Average orbital speed: 16.82 km/s
- Mean anomaly: 349.267°
- Mean motion: 0° 10^{m} 37.308^{s} / day
- Inclination: 2.1494°
- Longitude of ascending node: 80.141°
- Argument of perihelion: 180.953°

Physical characteristics
- Dimensions: 54.66±3.9 km
- Synodic rotation period: 7.80 h (0.325 d)
- Geometric albedo: 0.1318±0.021
- Spectral type: C?
- Absolute magnitude (H): 9.13

222 Lucia is a large Themistian asteroid. It was discovered by Johann Palisa on 9 February 1882 in Vienna and named after Lucia, daughter of Austro-Hungarian explorer Graf Wilczek.

This object is spectral C-type and is probably composed of primitive carbonaceous material. Based upon analysis of infrared spectra, it has a diameter of 59.8 ± 0.8 km. This object belongs to the Themis family, which was formed by the break-up of a larger parent body about a billion years ago.
