= Palisa (crater) =

Crater on the Moon

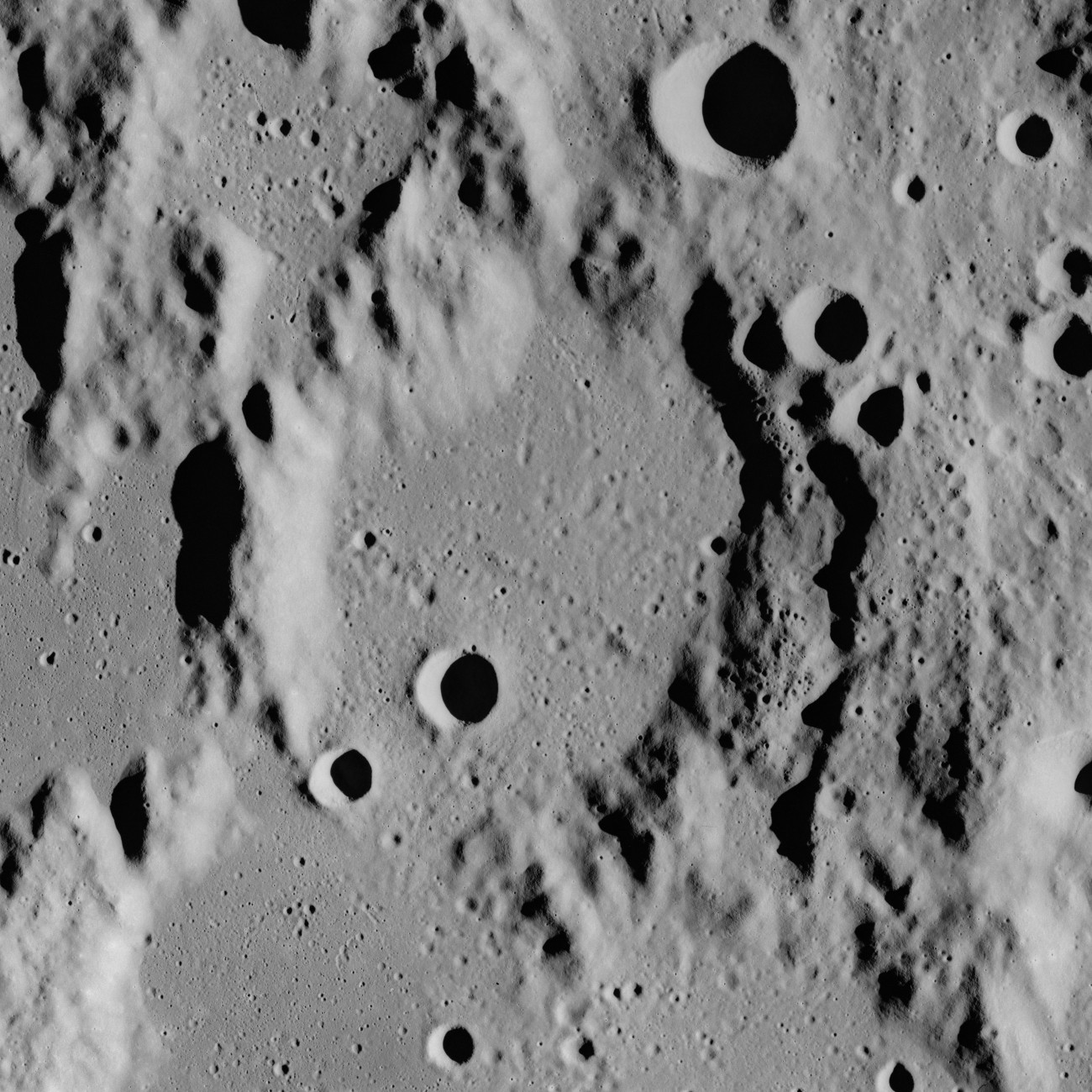
- Apollo 16 image
- Coordinates: 9.4°S 7.2°W
- Diameter: 33 km
- Depth: 0.9 km
- Colongitude: 7° at sunrise
- Eponym: Johann Palisa

Palisa is the remnant of a lunar impact crater that is located to the west of the walled plain named Ptolemaeus. It lies to the north-northeast of the crater Davy, and is attached to the lava-flooded satellite crater Davy Y by a wide break in the southwest rim. The crater is named after the Austrian astronomer Johann Palisa.

The rim of Palisa is worn and eroded, especially in the western half where there are multiple gaps that join the crater floor to the Mare Nubium to the west. The interior is nearly flat, and marked only by a pair of tiny craterlets in the southwest gap. The larger of this crater pair is designated Palisa P. Additional satellite craterlets D, A, and W lie just outside the northeast rim.

== Satellite craters ==
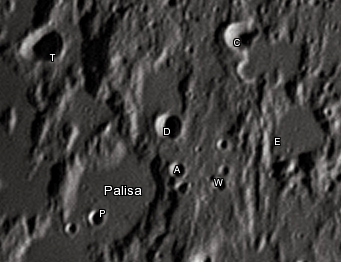
Palisa crater and its satellite craters taken from Earth in 2012 at the University of Hertfordshire's Bayfordbury Observatory with the telescopes Meade LX200 14" and Lumenera Skynyx 2-1

By convention these features are identified on lunar maps by placing the letter on the side of the crater midpoint that is closest to Palisa.

Palisa	Latitude	Longitude	Diameter
A	9.0° S	6.7° W	5 km
C	7.7° S	6.4° W	9 km
D	8.6° S	6.9° W	8 km
E	8.4° S	5.7° W	18 km
P	9.6° S	7.3° W	5 km
T	8.2° S	8.2° W	12 km
W	9.1° S	6.3° W	4 km
