= 902 Probitas =

Main-belt asteroid

Discovery
- Discovered by: J. Palisa
- Discovery site: Vienna
- Discovery date: 3 September 1918

Designations
- Pronunciation: /ˈprɒbɪtæs/
- Alternative designations: 1918 EJ

Orbital characteristics
- Epoch 31 July 2016 (JD 2457600.5)
- Uncertainty parameter 0
- Observation arc: 97.58 yr (35642 days)
- Aphelion: 2.8857 AU (431.69 Gm)
- Perihelion: 2.0084 AU (300.45 Gm)
- Semi-major axis: 2.4470 AU (366.07 Gm)
- Eccentricity: 0.17926
- Orbital period (sidereal): 3.83 yr (1398.2 d)
- Mean anomaly: 190.000°
- Mean motion: 0° 15^{m} 26.928^{s} / day
- Inclination: 6.3472°
- Longitude of ascending node: 353.081°
- Argument of perihelion: 28.520°
- Earth MOID: 1.01204 AU (151.399 Gm)
- Jupiter MOID: 2.5861 AU (386.88 Gm)
- T_{Jupiter}: 3.467

Physical characteristics
- Synodic rotation period: 10.117 h (0.4215 d)
- Absolute magnitude (H): 12.0

902 Probitas is a minor planet orbiting the Sun. It was discovered by an Austrian astronomer Johann Palisa in Vienna on 3 September 1918.
