= 876 Scott =

Main-belt asteroid

Discovery
- Discovered by: J. Palisa
- Discovery site: Vienna
- Discovery date: 20 June 1917

Designations
- Alternative designations: 1917 CH

Orbital characteristics
- Epoch 31 July 2016 (JD 2457600.5)
- Uncertainty parameter 0
- Observation arc: 98.76 yr (36073 days)
- Aphelion: 3.3490 AU (501.00 Gm)
- Perihelion: 2.6681 AU (399.14 Gm)
- Semi-major axis: 3.0085 AU (450.07 Gm)
- Eccentricity: 0.11316
- Orbital period (sidereal): 5.22 yr (1906.0 d)
- Mean anomaly: 270.962°
- Mean motion: 0° 11^{m} 19.932^{s} / day
- Inclination: 11.361°
- Longitude of ascending node: 150.966°
- Argument of perihelion: 211.651°
- Earth MOID: 1.67015 AU (249.851 Gm)
- Jupiter MOID: 2.09064 AU (312.755 Gm)
- T_{Jupiter}: 3.211

Physical characteristics
- Mean radius: 10.94±1 km
- Synodic rotation period: 11.8137 h (0.49224 d)
- Geometric albedo: 0.1626±0.034
- Absolute magnitude (H): 10.89

876 Scott is a minor planet orbiting the Sun.

For a long time, its name had been falsely attributed to Robert Falcon Scott. In fact, it was named by the discoverer in grateful memory of Miss E. Scott, who for a long time selflessly directed the relief efforts of the Society of Friends in Vienna (organized by British and American Quakers) and was particularly concerned with improving the situation of members of Austrian universities. The name therefore honors Ms. E. Scott in recognition of her help and support for the members of Austrian universities after World War I.
