= 299 Thora =

Main-belt asteroid

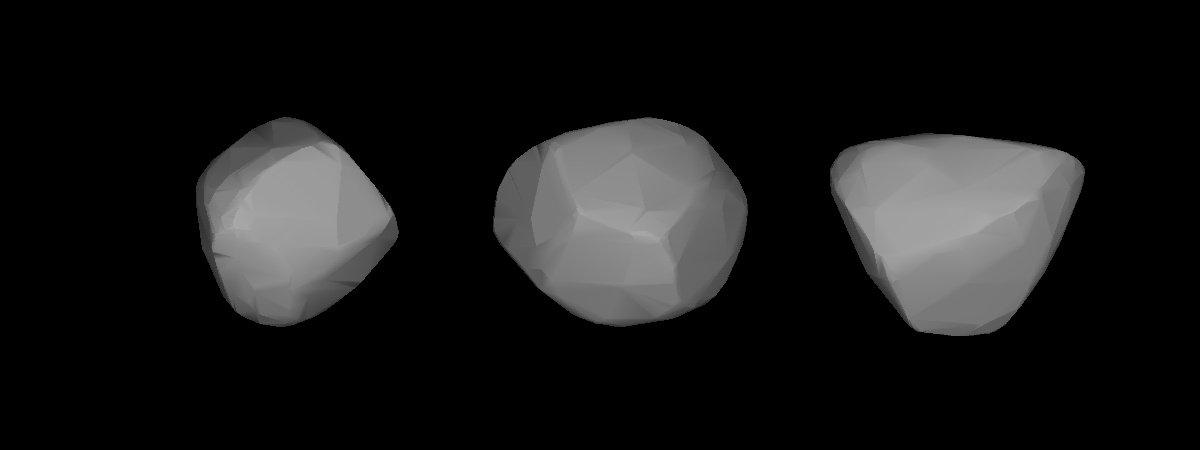
- Lightcurve-based 3D model of 299 Thora

Discovery
- Discovered by: Johann Palisa
- Discovery date: 6 October 1890

Designations
- Named after: Thor
- Alternative designations: A890 TA, 1935 PC; 1939 PK
- Minor planet category: Main belt

Orbital characteristics
- Epoch 31 July 2016 (JD 2457600.5)
- Uncertainty parameter 0
- Observation arc: 83.21 yr (30393 d)
- Aphelion: 2.58 AU (386.69 Gm)
- Perihelion: 2.28 AU (341.48 Gm)
- Semi-major axis: 2.43 AU (364.09 Gm)
- Eccentricity: 0.062093
- Orbital period (sidereal): 3.80 yr (1,386.8 d)
- Mean anomaly: 40.9107°
- Mean motion: 0° 15^{m} 34.52^{s} / day
- Inclination: 1.60383°
- Longitude of ascending node: 241.531°
- Argument of perihelion: 150.672°

Physical characteristics
- Dimensions: 17.06±1.5 km
- Synodic rotation period: 274 h (11.4 d)
- Geometric albedo: 0.1673±0.033
- Absolute magnitude (H): 11.3

299 Thora is a 17 km Main belt asteroid with a potentially long 274-hour rotation period. It was discovered by Johann Palisa on 6 October 1890 in Vienna.

This object has a very low rate of spin, requiring 11.37 ± 0.04 days (272.9 ± 0.9 h) to complete a full rotation.
