= 914 Palisana =

Main-belt asteroid

Discovery
- Discovered by: M. F. Wolf
- Discovery site: Heidelberg Obs.
- Discovery date: 4 July 1919

Designations
- Pronunciation: /pælɪˈseɪnə/
- Named after: Johann Palisa (Austrian astronomer)
- Alternative designations: 1919 FN · A904 PB; A916 WC
- Minor planet category: main-belt · Phocaea

Orbital characteristics
- Epoch 31 July 2016 (JD 2457600.5)
- Uncertainty parameter 0
- Observation arc: 84.07 yr (30,706 days)
- Aphelion: 2.9857 AU
- Perihelion: 1.9300 AU
- Semi-major axis: 2.4578 AU
- Eccentricity: 0.2148
- Orbital period (sidereal): 3.85 yr (1,407 days)
- Mean anomaly: 71.191°
- Mean motion: 0° 15^{m} 20.88^{s} / day
- Inclination: 25.206°
- Longitude of ascending node: 255.80°
- Argument of perihelion: 49.144°

Physical characteristics
- Dimensions: 78.71±2.64 km (composite estimate) Individual estimates: 76 km; 76.61±1.7 km; 77.000±13.12 km; 91.2 km; 97.33±1.49 km
- Mass: (3.45±0.75)×10^{17} kg (Note: Calculated from its standard gravitational parameter GM = 0.023±0.005 km^{3}/s^{2}.)
- Mean density: 1.46 g/cm^{3} (Note: Assuming a diameter of 76.2 km.)
- Synodic rotation period: 15.922 h (0.6634 d)
- Geometric albedo: 0.0943±0.004; 0.0666; 0.059±0.002; 0.0934±0.0376
- Spectral type: B–V = 0.741; U–B = 0.368; Tholen = CU; C
- Absolute magnitude (H): 8.76; 8.96±0.30

914 Palisana, provisional designation 1919 FN, is a Phocaean asteroid from the inner regions of the asteroid belt, approximately 77 kilometers in diameter. It was discovered by German astronomer Max Wolf at Heidelberg Observatory on 4 July 1919.

== Description ==
The carbonaceous asteroid is classified as a CU-type on the Tholen taxonomic scheme. It orbits the Sun at a distance of 1.9–3.0 AU once every 3 years and 10 months (1,407 days). Its orbit has an eccentricity of 0.21 and an inclination of 25° with respect to the ecliptic.

Measurements using the adaptive optics at the W. M. Keck Observatory give a diameter estimate of 76 km. The size ratio between the major and minor axes is 1.16. During 2004, the asteroid was observed occulting a star. The resulting chords were used to determine a diameter estimate of 91.2 km. This is a poor match to the diameter determined by other means.

The minor planet is named after the Austrian astronomer Johann Palisa (1848–1925), who has discovered many asteroids himself between 1874 and 1923.
