= 273 Atropos =

Asteroid orbiting the Sun in the main belt of asteroids

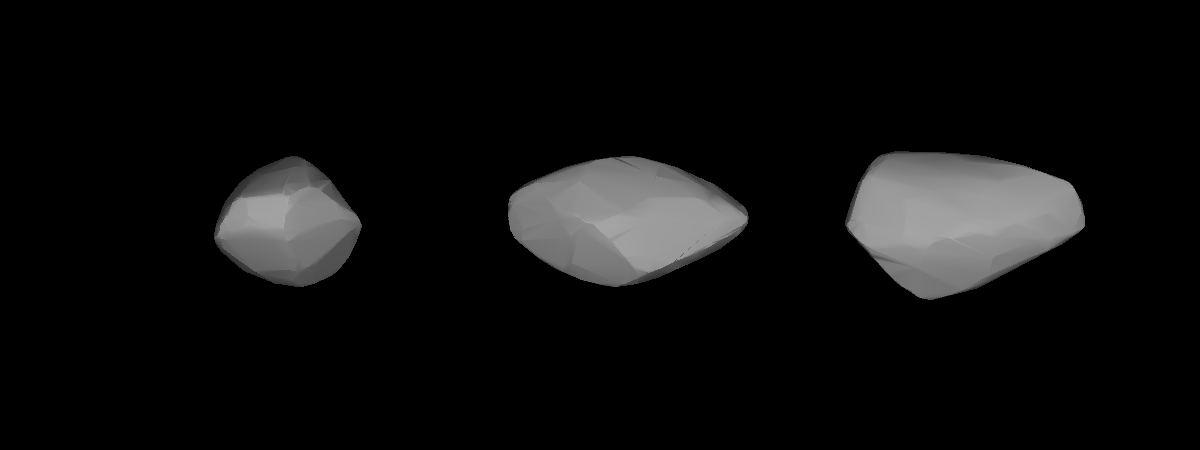
- Lightcurve-based 3D model of 273 Atropos

Discovery
- Discovered by: Johann Palisa
- Discovery date: 8 March 1888

Designations
- Pronunciation: /ˈætrəpɒs/
- Named after: Atropos
- Alternative designations: A888 EA, 1910 CC
- Minor planet category: Main belt

Orbital characteristics
- Epoch 31 July 2016 (JD 2457600.5)
- Uncertainty parameter 0
- Observation arc: 105.94 yr (38695 d)
- Aphelion: 2.7792 AU (415.76 Gm)
- Perihelion: 2.01097 AU (300.837 Gm)
- Semi-major axis: 2.39507 AU (358.297 Gm)
- Eccentricity: 0.16037
- Orbital period (sidereal): 3.71 yr (1353.9 d)
- Mean anomaly: 127.80°
- Mean motion: 0° 15^{m} 57.276^{s} / day
- Inclination: 20.454°
- Longitude of ascending node: 158.957°
- Argument of perihelion: 121.16°

Physical characteristics
- Dimensions: 29.27±1.3 km
- Synodic rotation period: 23.924 h (0.9968 d); 23.852 h
- Geometric albedo: 0.1624±0.015
- Absolute magnitude (H): 10.26

273 Atropos is a typical Main belt asteroid that was discovered by Austrian astronomer Johann Palisa on 8 March 1888 in Vienna.

Photometric observations of this asteroid at the Palmer Divide Observatory in Colorado Springs, Colorado, in 2007 gave a light curve with a period of 23.852 ± 0.003 hours and a brightness variation of 0.60 ± 0.03 in magnitude.
