= 513 Centesima =

Main-belt asteroid

Discovery
- Discovered by: Max Wolf
- Discovery site: Heidelberg Observatory
- Discovery date: 24 August 1903

Designations
- Pronunciation: /sɛnˈtɛzɪmə/
- Alternative designations: A903 QD · A914 WB · A916 BC · 1950 RM_{1} (Note: The MPC notates Cantesima's retroactive new-style designations as 1903 QD, 1914 WB, and 1916 BC. Its old-style designations were 1903 LY, 1914 WB, and 1916 Sav.)
- Minor planet category: Main belt

Orbital characteristics
- Epoch 31 July 2016 (JD 2457600.5) (JD 2456400.5)
- Uncertainty parameter 0
- Observation arc: 112.65 yr (41144 d)
- Aphelion: 3.2648 AU (488.41 Gm)
- Perihelion: 2.7679 AU (414.07 Gm)
- Semi-major axis: 3.0163 AU (451.23 Gm)
- Eccentricity: 0.082371
- Orbital period (sidereal): 5.24 yr (1913.5 d)
- Mean anomaly: 146.99°
- Mean motion: 0° 11^{m} 17.304^{s} / day
- Inclination: 9.7329°
- Longitude of ascending node: 184.45°
- Argument of perihelion: 226.24°

Physical characteristics
- Mean radius: 25.075±0.9 km (IRAS)
- Equatorial escape velocity: ~25 m/s (56 mph)
- Sidereal rotation period: 4.792 ± 0.019 h (0.19967 ± 0.00079 d)
- Geometric albedo: 0.0885±0.007
- Spectral type: S (Tholen); K (SMASSII)
- Absolute magnitude (H): 9.75

513 Centesima is a 50 km Main-belt asteroid orbiting the Sun. It is one of the core members of the Eos family of asteroids. Relatively little is known about this tiny asteroid. It is not known to possess any natural satellites, so its mass is unknown. However, its brief rotation period of just over 5 hours implies that the body must be exceptionally dense, for its gravity is able to counteract the centrifugal force. It was discovered 24 August 1903 by late-nineteenth- and early-twentieth-century astronomer Max Wolf.

== History ==
Centesima was discovered on 24 August 1903 by astronomer Max Wolf at Heidelberg Observatory, where it was given the old-style provisional designation 1903 LY. The asteroid then received its permanent number (513) by 1905, and was given the name Centesima by 1907. The name commemorates the asteroid as Wolf's 100th minor planet discovery.

In 1925, the old-style minor planet provisional designation scheme was replaced by the system currently in use. the Minor Planet Center (MPC) has since retroactively applied the new-style system to pre-1925 designations. Thus, Centesima's provisional designation given upon its discovery was changed to A903 QD.

== Orbit ==
Centesima orbits the Sun at an average distance—its semi-major axis—of 3.01 astronomical units (AU), taking 5.23 years to complete one revolution. Along its orbit, its distance from the Sun varies between 2.75 AU at perihelion to 3.28 AU at aphelion due to its orbital eccentricity of 0.087. Its orbit is inclined by 9.73° with respect to the ecliptic plane. It is a member of the Eos family, a vast and ancient asteroid family located in the outer main belt.

== Physical characteristics ==
Centesima is estimated to be 48.8 kilometres (30.3 mi) in size. It is classified as an S-type asteroid in the Tholen classification scheme, and a K-type asteroid in the Small Main-belt Asteroid Spectroscopic Survey, Phase II (SMASSII) classification scheme. Based on observations of its lightcurve, or variations in its observed brightness, Centesima has a rotation period of 4.79 hours.
