= 292 Ludovica =

Main-belt asteroid

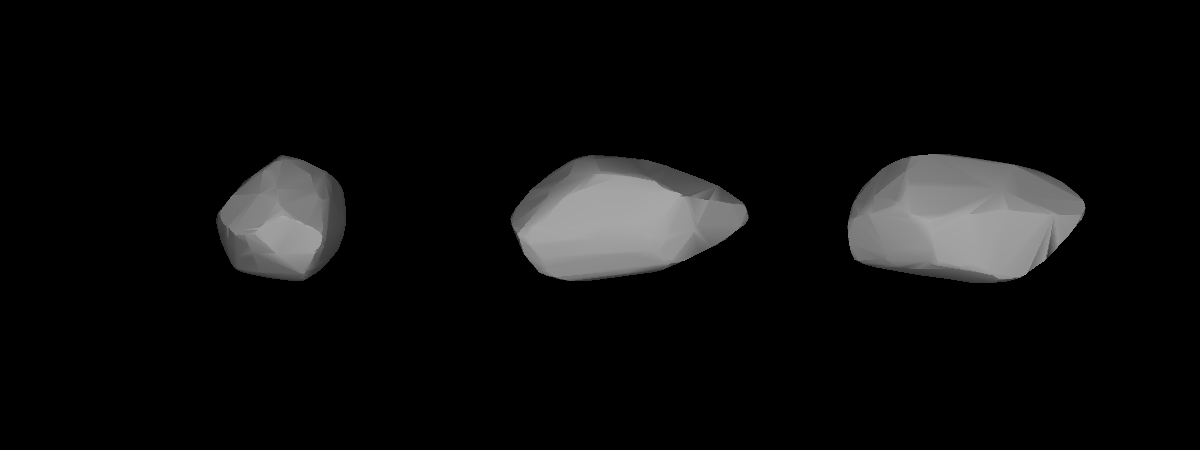
- Lightcurve-based 3D model of 292 Ludovica

Discovery
- Discovered by: Johann Palisa
- Discovery date: 25 April 1890

Designations
- Alternative designations: A890 HB, 1930 GM
- Minor planet category: Main belt

Orbital characteristics
- Epoch 31 July 2016 (JD 2457600.5)
- Uncertainty parameter 0
- Observation arc: 124.62 yr (45516 d)
- Aphelion: 2.61652 AU (391.426 Gm)
- Perihelion: 2.44314 AU (365.489 Gm)
- Semi-major axis: 2.52983 AU (378.457 Gm)
- Eccentricity: 0.034267
- Orbital period (sidereal): 4.02 yr (1469.7 d)
- Mean anomaly: 26.7727°
- Mean motion: 0° 14^{m} 41.798^{s} / day
- Inclination: 14.8967°
- Longitude of ascending node: 43.5319°
- Argument of perihelion: 287.035°

Physical characteristics
- Dimensions: 32.50±0.8 km 33 km
- Mean density: ~2.7 g/cm^{3}
- Synodic rotation period: 0.372 d (8.93 h)
- Geometric albedo: 0.2652±0.014; 0.265
- Spectral type: S
- Absolute magnitude (H): 9.9

292 Ludovica is a main belt asteroid. It was discovered by the Austrian astronomer Johann Palisa on 25 April 1890 in Vienna. The reason for this name selection is unknown.

Photometric data collected during 2010 was used to produce a light curve for 292 Ludovica, revealing a rotation period of 8.90±0.05 h with a brightness variation of 0.35±0.05 in magnitude. This result is consistent with previous studies.
