= List of named minor planets: 1–999 =

This is a partial list of named minor planets in numerical order. It contains a total of 999 entries as of 20 March 2026. Minor planets for which no article exist are displayed in grey color and redirect to the list of minor planets (see List of minor planets § Main index).

== From 1 to 999 ==
- 1 Ceres
- 2 Pallas
- 3 Juno
- 4 Vesta
- 5 Astraea
- 6 Hebe
- 7 Iris
- 8 Flora
- 9 Metis
- 10 Hygiea
- 11 Parthenope
- 12 Victoria
- 13 Egeria
- 14 Irene
- 15 Eunomia
- 16 Psyche
- 17 Thetis
- 18 Melpomene
- 19 Fortuna
- 20 Massalia
- 21 Lutetia
- 22 Kalliope
- 23 Thalia
- 24 Themis
- 25 Phocaea
- 26 Proserpina
- 27 Euterpe
- 28 Bellona
- 29 Amphitrite
- 30 Urania
- 31 Euphrosyne
- 32 Pomona
- 33 Polyhymnia
- 34 Circe
- 35 Leukothea
- 36 Atalante
- 37 Fides
- 38 Leda
- 39 Laetitia
- 40 Harmonia
- 41 Daphne
- 42 Isis
- 43 Ariadne
- 44 Nysa
- 45 Eugenia
- 46 Hestia
- 47 Aglaja
- 48 Doris
- 49 Pales
- 50 Virginia
- 51 Nemausa
- 52 Europa
- 53 Kalypso
- 54 Alexandra
- 55 Pandora
- 56 Melete
- 57 Mnemosyne
- 58 Concordia
- 59 Elpis
- 60 Echo
- 61 Danaë
- 62 Erato
- 63 Ausonia
- 64 Angelina
- 65 Cybele
- 66 Maja
- 67 Asia
- 68 Leto
- 69 Hesperia
- 70 Panopaea
- 71 Niobe
- 72 Feronia
- 73 Klytia
- 74 Galatea
- 75 Eurydike
- 76 Freia
- 77 Frigga
- 78 Diana
- 79 Eurynome
- 80 Sappho
- 81 Terpsichore
- 82 Alkmene
- 83 Beatrix
- 84 Klio
- 85 Io
- 86 Semele
- 87 Sylvia
- 88 Thisbe
- 89 Julia
- 90 Antiope
- 91 Aegina
- 92 Undina
- 93 Minerva
- 94 Aurora
- 95 Arethusa
- 96 Aegle
- 97 Klotho
- 98 Ianthe
- 99 Dike
- 100 Hekate
- 101 Helena
- 102 Miriam
- 103 Hera
- 104 Klymene
- 105 Artemis
- 106 Dione
- 107 Camilla
- 108 Hecuba
- 109 Felicitas
- 110 Lydia
- 111 Ate
- 112 Iphigenia
- 113 Amalthea
- 114 Kassandra
- 115 Thyra
- 116 Sirona
- 117 Lomia
- 118 Peitho
- 119 Althaea
- 120 Lachesis
- 121 Hermione
- 122 Gerda
- 123 Brunhild
- 124 Alkeste
- 125 Liberatrix
- 126 Velleda
- 127 Johanna
- 128 Nemesis
- 129 Antigone
- 130 Elektra
- 131 Vala
- 132 Aethra
- 133 Cyrene
- 134 Sophrosyne
- 135 Hertha
- 136 Austria
- 137 Meliboea
- 138 Tolosa
- 139 Juewa
- 140 Siwa
- 141 Lumen
- 142 Polana
- 143 Adria
- 144 Vibilia
- 145 Adeona
- 146 Lucina
- 147 Protogeneia
- 148 Gallia
- 149 Medusa
- 150 Nuwa
- 151 Abundantia
- 152 Atala
- 153 Hilda
- 154 Bertha
- 155 Scylla
- 156 Xanthippe
- 157 Dejanira
- 158 Koronis
- 159 Aemilia
- 160 Una
- 161 Athor
- 162 Laurentia
- 163 Erigone
- 164 Eva
- 165 Loreley
- 166 Rhodope
- 167 Urda
- 168 Sibylla
- 169 Zelia
- 170 Maria
- 171 Ophelia
- 172 Baucis
- 173 Ino
- 174 Phaedra
- 175 Andromache
- 176 Iduna
- 177 Irma
- 178 Belisana
- 179 Klytaemnestra
- 180 Garumna
- 181 Eucharis
- 182 Elsa
- 183 Istria
- 184 Dejopeja
- 185 Eunike
- 186 Celuta
- 187 Lamberta
- 188 Menippe
- 189 Phthia
- 190 Ismene
- 191 Kolga
- 192 Nausikaa
- 193 Ambrosia
- 194 Prokne
- 195 Eurykleia
- 196 Philomela
- 197 Arete
- 198 Ampella
- 199 Byblis
- 200 Dynamene
- 201 Penelope
- 202 Chryseïs
- 203 Pompeja
- 204 Kallisto
- 205 Martha
- 206 Hersilia
- 207 Hedda
- 208 Lacrimosa
- 209 Dido
- 210 Isabella
- 211 Isolda
- 212 Medea
- 213 Lilaea
- 214 Aschera
- 215 Oenone
- 216 Kleopatra
- 217 Eudora
- 218 Bianca
- 219 Thusnelda
- 220 Stephania
- 221 Eos
- 222 Lucia
- 223 Rosa
- 224 Oceana
- 225 Henrietta
- 226 Weringia
- 227 Philosophia
- 228 Agathe
- 229 Adelinda
- 230 Athamantis
- 231 Vindobona
- 232 Russia
- 233 Asterope
- 234 Barbara
- 235 Carolina
- 236 Honoria
- 237 Coelestina
- 238 Hypatia
- 239 Adrastea
- 240 Vanadis
- 241 Germania
- 242 Kriemhild
- 243 Ida
- 244 Sita
- 245 Vera
- 246 Asporina
- 247 Eukrate
- 248 Lameia
- 249 Ilse
- 250 Bettina
- 251 Sophia
- 252 Clementina
- 253 Mathilde
- 254 Augusta
- 255 Oppavia
- 256 Walpurga
- 257 Silesia
- 258 Tyche
- 259 Aletheia
- 260 Huberta
- 261 Prymno
- 262 Valda
- 263 Dresda
- 264 Libussa
- 265 Anna
- 266 Aline
- 267 Tirza
- 268 Adorea
- 269 Justitia
- 270 Anahita
- 271 Penthesilea
- 272 Antonia
- 273 Atropos
- 274 Philagoria
- 275 Sapientia
- 276 Adelheid
- 277 Elvira
- 278 Paulina
- 279 Thule
- 280 Philia
- 281 Lucretia
- 282 Clorinde
- 283 Emma
- 284 Amalia
- 285 Regina
- 286 Iclea
- 287 Nephthys
- 288 Glauke
- 289 Nenetta
- 290 Bruna
- 291 Alice
- 292 Ludovica
- 293 Brasilia
- 294 Felicia
- 295 Theresia
- 296 Phaëtusa
- 297 Caecilia
- 298 Baptistina
- 299 Thora
- 300 Geraldina
- 301 Bavaria
- 302 Clarissa
- 303 Josephina
- 304 Olga
- 305 Gordonia
- 306 Unitas
- 307 Nike
- 308 Polyxo
- 309 Fraternitas
- 310 Margarita
- 311 Claudia
- 312 Pierretta
- 313 Chaldaea
- 314 Rosalia
- 315 Constantia
- 316 Goberta
- 317 Roxane
- 318 Magdalena
- 319 Leona
- 320 Katharina
- 321 Florentina
- 322 Phaeo
- 323 Brucia
- 324 Bamberga
- 325 Heidelberga
- 326 Tamara
- 327 Columbia
- 328 Gudrun
- 329 Svea
- 330 Adalberta
- 331 Etheridgea
- 332 Siri
- 333 Badenia
- 334 Chicago
- 335 Roberta
- 336 Lacadiera
- 337 Devosa
- 338 Budrosa
- 339 Dorothea
- 340 Eduarda
- 341 California
- 342 Endymion
- 343 Ostara
- 344 Desiderata
- 345 Tercidina
- 346 Hermentaria
- 347 Pariana
- 348 May
- 349 Dembowska
- 350 Ornamenta
- 351 Yrsa
- 352 Gisela
- 353 Ruperto-Carola
- 354 Eleonora
- 355 Gabriella
- 356 Liguria
- 357 Ninina
- 358 Apollonia
- 359 Georgia
- 360 Carlova
- 361 Bononia
- 362 Havnia
- 363 Padua
- 364 Isara
- 365 Corduba
- 366 Vincentina
- 367 Amicitia
- 368 Haidea
- 369 Aëria
- 370 Modestia
- 371 Bohemia
- 372 Palma
- 373 Melusina
- 374 Burgundia
- 375 Ursula
- 376 Geometria
- 377 Campania
- 378 Holmia
- 379 Huenna
- 380 Fiducia
- 381 Myrrha
- 382 Dodona
- 383 Janina
- 384 Burdigala
- 385 Ilmatar
- 386 Siegena
- 387 Aquitania
- 388 Charybdis
- 389 Industria
- 390 Alma
- 391 Ingeborg
- 392 Wilhelmina
- 393 Lampetia
- 394 Arduina
- 395 Delia
- 396 Aeolia
- 397 Vienna
- 398 Admete
- 399 Persephone
- 400 Ducrosa
- 401 Ottilia
- 402 Chloë
- 403 Cyane
- 404 Arsinoë
- 405 Thia
- 406 Erna
- 407 Arachne
- 408 Fama
- 409 Aspasia
- 410 Chloris
- 411 Xanthe
- 412 Elisabetha
- 413 Edburga
- 414 Liriope
- 415 Palatia
- 416 Vaticana
- 417 Suevia
- 418 Alemannia
- 419 Aurelia
- 420 Bertholda
- 421 Zähringia
- 422 Berolina
- 423 Diotima
- 424 Gratia
- 425 Cornelia
- 426 Hippo
- 427 Galene
- 428 Monachia
- 429 Lotis
- 430 Hybris
- 431 Nephele
- 432 Pythia
- 433 Eros
- 434 Hungaria
- 435 Ella
- 436 Patricia
- 437 Rhodia
- 438 Zeuxo
- 439 Ohio
- 440 Theodora
- 441 Bathilde
- 442 Eichsfeldia
- 443 Photographica
- 444 Gyptis
- 445 Edna
- 446 Aeternitas
- 447 Valentine
- 448 Natalie
- 449 Hamburga
- 450 Brigitta
- 451 Patientia
- 452 Hamiltonia
- 453 Tea
- 454 Mathesis
- 455 Bruchsalia
- 456 Abnoba
- 457 Alleghenia
- 458 Hercynia
- 459 Signe
- 460 Scania
- 461 Saskia
- 462 Eriphyla
- 463 Lola
- 464 Megaira
- 465 Alekto
- 466 Tisiphone
- 467 Laura
- 468 Lina
- 469 Argentina
- 470 Kilia
- 471 Papagena
- 472 Roma
- 473 Nolli
- 474 Prudentia
- 475 Ocllo
- 476 Hedwig
- 477 Italia
- 478 Tergeste
- 479 Caprera
- 480 Hansa
- 481 Emita
- 482 Petrina
- 483 Seppina
- 484 Pittsburghia
- 485 Genua
- 486 Cremona
- 487 Venetia
- 488 Kreusa
- 489 Comacina
- 490 Veritas
- 491 Carina
- 492 Gismonda
- 493 Griseldis
- 494 Virtus
- 495 Eulalia
- 496 Gryphia
- 497 Iva
- 498 Tokio
- 499 Venusia
- 500 Selinur
- 501 Urhixidur
- 502 Sigune
- 503 Evelyn
- 504 Cora
- 505 Cava
- 506 Marion
- 507 Laodica
- 508 Princetonia
- 509 Iolanda
- 510 Mabella
- 511 Davida
- 512 Taurinensis
- 513 Centesima
- 514 Armida
- 515 Athalia
- 516 Amherstia
- 517 Edith
- 518 Halawe
- 519 Sylvania
- 520 Franziska
- 521 Brixia
- 522 Helga
- 523 Ada
- 524 Fidelio
- 525 Adelaide
- 526 Jena
- 527 Euryanthe
- 528 Rezia
- 529 Preziosa
- 530 Turandot
- 531 Zerlina
- 532 Herculina
- 533 Sara
- 534 Nassovia
- 535 Montague
- 536 Merapi
- 537 Pauly
- 538 Friederike
- 539 Pamina
- 540 Rosamunde
- 541 Deborah
- 542 Susanna
- 543 Charlotte
- 544 Jetta
- 545 Messalina
- 546 Herodias
- 547 Praxedis
- 548 Kressida
- 549 Jessonda
- 550 Senta
- 551 Ortrud
- 552 Sigelinde
- 553 Kundry
- 554 Peraga
- 555 Norma
- 556 Phyllis
- 557 Violetta
- 558 Carmen
- 559 Nanon
- 560 Delila
- 561 Ingwelde
- 562 Salome
- 563 Suleika
- 564 Dudu
- 565 Marbachia
- 566 Stereoskopia
- 567 Eleutheria
- 568 Cheruskia
- 569 Misa
- 570 Kythera
- 571 Dulcinea
- 572 Rebekka
- 573 Recha
- 574 Reginhild
- 575 Renate
- 576 Emanuela
- 577 Rhea
- 578 Happelia
- 579 Sidonia
- 580 Selene
- 581 Tauntonia
- 582 Olympia
- 583 Klotilde
- 584 Semiramis
- 585 Bilkis
- 586 Thekla
- 587 Hypsipyle
- 588 Achilles
- 589 Croatia
- 590 Tomyris
- 591 Irmgard
- 592 Bathseba
- 593 Titania
- 594 Mireille
- 595 Polyxena
- 596 Scheila
- 597 Bandusia
- 598 Octavia
- 599 Luisa
- 600 Musa
- 601 Nerthus
- 602 Marianna
- 603 Timandra
- 604 Tekmessa
- 605 Juvisia
- 606 Brangäne
- 607 Jenny
- 608 Adolfine
- 609 Fulvia
- 610 Valeska
- 611 Valeria
- 612 Veronika
- 613 Ginevra
- 614 Pia
- 615 Roswitha
- 616 Elly
- 617 Patroclus
- 618 Elfriede
- 619 Triberga
- 620 Drakonia
- 621 Werdandi
- 622 Esther
- 623 Chimaera
- 624 Hektor
- 625 Xenia
- 626 Notburga
- 627 Charis
- 628 Christine
- 629 Bernardina
- 630 Euphemia
- 631 Philippina
- 632 Pyrrha
- 633 Zelima
- 634 Ute
- 635 Vundtia
- 636 Erika
- 637 Chrysothemis
- 638 Moira
- 639 Latona
- 640 Brambilla
- 641 Agnes
- 642 Clara
- 643 Scheherezade
- 644 Cosima
- 645 Agrippina
- 646 Kastalia
- 647 Adelgunde
- 648 Pippa
- 649 Josefa
- 650 Amalasuntha
- 651 Antikleia
- 652 Jubilatrix
- 653 Berenike
- 654 Zelinda
- 655 Briseïs
- 656 Beagle
- 657 Gunlöd
- 658 Asteria
- 659 Nestor
- 660 Crescentia
- 661 Cloelia
- 662 Newtonia
- 663 Gerlinde
- 664 Judith
- 665 Sabine
- 666 Desdemona
- 667 Denise
- 668 Dora
- 669 Kypria
- 670 Ottegebe
- 671 Carnegia
- 672 Astarte
- 673 Edda
- 674 Rachele
- 675 Ludmilla
- 676 Melitta
- 677 Aaltje
- 678 Fredegundis
- 679 Pax
- 680 Genoveva
- 681 Gorgo
- 682 Hagar
- 683 Lanzia
- 684 Hildburg
- 685 Hermia
- 686 Gersuind
- 687 Tinette
- 688 Melanie
- 689 Zita
- 690 Wratislavia
- 691 Lehigh
- 692 Hippodamia
- 693 Zerbinetta
- 694 Ekard
- 695 Bella
- 696 Leonora
- 697 Galilea
- 698 Ernestina
- 699 Hela
- 700 Auravictrix
- 701 Oriola
- 702 Alauda
- 703 Noëmi
- 704 Interamnia
- 705 Erminia
- 706 Hirundo
- 707 Steina
- 708 Raphaela
- 709 Fringilla
- 710 Gertrud
- 711 Marmulla
- 712 Boliviana
- 713 Luscinia
- 714 Ulula
- 715 Transvaalia
- 716 Berkeley
- 717 Wisibada
- 718 Erida
- 719 Albert
- 720 Bohlinia
- 721 Tabora
- 722 Frieda
- 723 Hammonia
- 724 Hapag
- 725 Amanda
- 726 Joëlla
- 727 Nipponia
- 728 Leonisis
- 729 Watsonia
- 730 Athanasia
- 731 Sorga
- 732 Tjilaki
- 733 Mocia
- 734 Benda
- 735 Marghanna
- 736 Harvard
- 737 Arequipa
- 738 Alagasta
- 739 Mandeville
- 740 Cantabia
- 741 Botolphia
- 742 Edisona
- 743 Eugenisis
- 744 Aguntina
- 745 Mauritia
- 746 Marlu
- 747 Winchester
- 748 Simeïsa
- 749 Malzovia
- 750 Oskar
- 751 Faïna
- 752 Sulamitis
- 753 Tiflis
- 754 Malabar
- 755 Quintilla
- 756 Lilliana
- 757 Portlandia
- 758 Mancunia
- 759 Vinifera
- 760 Massinga
- 761 Brendelia
- 762 Pulcova
- 763 Cupido
- 764 Gedania
- 765 Mattiaca
- 766 Moguntia
- 767 Bondia
- 768 Struveana
- 769 Tatjana
- 770 Bali
- 771 Libera
- 772 Tanete
- 773 Irmintraud
- 774 Armor
- 775 Lumière
- 776 Berbericia
- 777 Gutemberga
- 778 Theobalda
- 779 Nina
- 780 Armenia
- 781 Kartvelia
- 782 Montefiore
- 783 Nora
- 784 Pickeringia
- 785 Zwetana
- 786 Bredichina
- 787 Moskva
- 788 Hohensteina
- 789 Lena
- 790 Pretoria
- 791 Ani
- 792 Metcalfia
- 793 Arizona
- 794 Irenaea
- 795 Fini
- 796 Sarita
- 797 Montana
- 798 Ruth
- 799 Gudula
- 800 Kressmannia
- 801 Helwerthia
- 802 Epyaxa
- 803 Picka
- 804 Hispania
- 805 Hormuthia
- 806 Gyldénia
- 807 Ceraskia
- 808 Merxia
- 809 Lundia
- 810 Atossa
- 811 Nauheima
- 812 Adele
- 813 Baumeia
- 814 Tauris
- 815 Coppelia
- 816 Juliana
- 817 Annika
- 818 Kapteynia
- 819 Barnardiana
- 820 Adriana
- 821 Fanny
- 822 Lalage
- 823 Sisigambis
- 824 Anastasia
- 825 Tanina
- 826 Henrika
- 827 Wolfiana
- 828 Lindemannia
- 829 Academia
- 830 Petropolitana
- 831 Stateira
- 832 Karin
- 833 Monica
- 834 Burnhamia
- 835 Olivia
- 836 Jole
- 837 Schwarzschilda
- 838 Seraphina
- 839 Valborg
- 840 Zenobia
- 841 Arabella
- 842 Kerstin
- 843 Nicolaia
- 844 Leontina
- 845 Naëma
- 846 Lipperta
- 847 Agnia
- 848 Inna
- 849 Ara
- 850 Altona
- 851 Zeissia
- 852 Wladilena
- 853 Nansenia
- 854 Frostia
- 855 Newcombia
- 856 Backlunda
- 857 Glasenappia
- 858 El Djezaïr
- 859 Bouzaréah
- 860 Ursina
- 861 Aïda
- 862 Franzia
- 863 Benkoela
- 864 Aase
- 865 Zubaida
- 866 Fatme
- 867 Kovacia
- 868 Lova
- 869 Mellena
- 870 Manto
- 871 Amneris
- 872 Holda
- 873 Mechthild
- 874 Rotraut
- 875 Nymphe
- 876 Scott
- 877 Walküre
- 878 Mildred
- 879 Ricarda
- 880 Herba
- 881 Athene
- 882 Swetlana
- 883 Matterania
- 884 Priamus
- 885 Ulrike
- 886 Washingtonia
- 887 Alinda
- 888 Parysatis
- 889 Erynia
- 890 Waltraut
- 891 Gunhild
- 892 Seeligeria
- 893 Leopoldina
- 894 Erda
- 895 Helio
- 896 Sphinx
- 897 Lysistrata
- 898 Hildegard
- 899 Jokaste
- 900 Rosalinde
- 901 Brunsia
- 902 Probitas
- 903 Nealley
- 904 Rockefellia
- 905 Universitas
- 906 Repsolda
- 907 Rhoda
- 908 Buda
- 909 Ulla
- 910 Anneliese
- 911 Agamemnon
- 912 Maritima
- 913 Otila
- 914 Palisana
- 915 Cosette
- 916 America
- 917 Lyka
- 918 Itha
- 919 Ilsebill
- 920 Rogeria
- 921 Jovita
- 922 Schlutia
- 923 Herluga
- 924 Toni
- 925 Alphonsina
- 926 Imhilde
- 927 Ratisbona
- 928 Hildrun
- 929 Algunde
- 930 Westphalia
- 931 Whittemora
- 932 Hooveria
- 933 Susi
- 934 Thüringia
- 935 Clivia
- 936 Kunigunde
- 937 Bethgea
- 938 Chlosinde
- 939 Isberga
- 940 Kordula
- 941 Murray
- 942 Romilda
- 943 Begonia
- 944 Hidalgo
- 945 Barcelona
- 946 Poësia
- 947 Monterosa
- 948 Jucunda
- 949 Hel
- 950 Ahrensa
- 951 Gaspra
- 952 Caia
- 953 Painleva
- 954 Li
- 955 Alstede
- 956 Elisa
- 957 Camelia
- 958 Asplinda
- 959 Arne
- 960 Birgit
- 961 Gunnie
- 962 Aslög
- 963 Iduberga
- 964 Subamara
- 965 Angelica
- 966 Muschi
- 967 Helionape
- 968 Petunia
- 969 Leocadia
- 970 Primula
- 971 Alsatia
- 972 Cohnia
- 973 Aralia
- 974 Lioba
- 975 Perseverantia
- 976 Benjamina
- 977 Philippa
- 978 Aidamina
- 979 Ilsewa
- 980 Anacostia
- 981 Martina
- 982 Franklina
- 983 Gunila
- 984 Gretia
- 985 Rosina
- 986 Amelia
- 987 Wallia
- 988 Appella
- 989 Schwassmannia
- 990 Yerkes
- 991 McDonalda
- 992 Swasey
- 993 Moultona
- 994 Otthild
- 995 Sternberga
- 996 Hilaritas
- 997 Priska
- 998 Bodea
- 999 Zachia
back to top

== See also ==
- List of minor planet discoverers
- List of observatory codes
- Meanings of minor planet names § Index
