= Senta (disambiguation) =

Senta is a town and municipality in Serbia.

Senta may also refer to:

- FK Senta, football team based in Senta, Serbia
- Senta (moth), a genus of moths
- Sennybridge Training Area, or SENTA, a UK Ministry of Defence military training area in Wales
- 550 Senta, an asteroid
- SS Senta (1917), a World War II Norwegian cargo ship sunk while part of Convoy SC 104
- Senta, a character in the Wagner opera The Flying Dutchman

== People ==
- Senta Berger (born 1941), Austrian actress and producer
- Senta Geißler (1902–2000), German painter
- Senta Moses (born 1973), American actress
- Senta Söneland (1882–1934), German actress
- Senta Trömel-Plötz (born 1939), German linguist
- Senta Wengraf (1924–2020), Austrian actress

== See also ==
- Battle of Zenta or Senta, fought in 1697 near Senta, Serbia
