= 946 Poësia =

Themis asteroid and slow rotator

Discovery
- Discovered by: M. F. Wolf
- Discovery site: Heidelberg Obs.
- Discovery date: 11 February 1921

Designations
- Pronunciation: /poʊˈiːsiə/
- Named after: poetry (goddess of poetry)
- Alternative designations: A921 CD · 1959 AA; A911 KB · 1911 KB; 1921 JC
- Minor planet category: main-belt · (outer); Themis

Orbital characteristics
- Epoch 31 May 2020 (JD 2459000.5)
- Uncertainty parameter 0
- Observation arc: 98.66 yr (36,034 d)
- Aphelion: 3.5647 AU
- Perihelion: 2.6709 AU
- Semi-major axis: 3.1178 AU
- Eccentricity: 0.1433
- Orbital period (sidereal): 5.51 yr (2,011 d)
- Mean anomaly: 30.119°
- Mean motion: 0° 10^{m} 44.4^{s} / day
- Inclination: 1.4312°
- Longitude of ascending node: 69.661°
- Argument of perihelion: 37.936°

Physical characteristics
- Mean diameter: 36.210±0.149 km; 39.60±0.64 km; 43.75±4.6 km
- Synodic rotation period: 108.5±0.5 h
- Geometric albedo: 0.0627±0.015; 0.079±0.003; 0.097±0.008
- Spectral type: Tholen = FU; Barucci = C0 B–V = 0.667±0.018; U–B = 0.336±0.024
- Absolute magnitude (H): 10.6

946 Poësia /poʊˈiːsiə/ is a Themis asteroid and slow rotator, approximately 39 kilometers (24 miles) in diameter, located in the outer regions of the asteroid belt. It was discovered by German astronomer Max Wolf at the Heidelberg-Königstuhl State Observatory on 11 February 1921 and given the provisional designations A921 CD and 1921 JC. The F-type asteroid has a long rotation period of 108.5 hours. It was named after the goddess of poetry.

== Orbit and classification ==
Poësia is a core member of the Themis family (602), a very large family of carbonaceous asteroids, named after 24 Themis. It orbits the Sun in the outer asteroid belt at a distance of 2.7–3.6 AU once every 5 years and 6 months (2,011 days; semi-major axis of 3.12 AU). Its orbit has an eccentricity of 0.14 and an inclination of 1° with respect to the ecliptic. The body's observation arc begins at Heidelberg Observatory on 11 May 1921, or three months after its official discovery observation.

== Naming ==
This minor planet was named after the goddess of poetry. The name was proposed by Russian astronomer Nikolaj Komendantov (1895–1937), and the naming was mentioned in The Names of the Minor Planets by Paul Herget in 1955 (H 91).

== Physical characteristics ==
In the Tholen classification, Poësia is an uncommon F-type asteroid, though with an unusual spectrum, while in the Barucci taxonomy, it is a carbonaceous C0-type. The overall spectral type for members of the Themistian family is that of a C-type.

=== Rotation period ===
In January 2009, a rotational lightcurve of Poësia was obtained from photometric observations by Robert Stephens at the Santana Observatory (646) and Goat Mountain Astronomical Research Station (G79) in California. Lightcurve analysis gave an exceptionally long rotation period of 108.5±0.5 hours with a brightness amplitude of 0.32±0.05 magnitude (U=2+). A few weeks later, Gary A. Vander Haagen at Stonegate Observatory (H67) determined an ambiguous period of 73.5 or 102.9 hours with an amplitude of 0.24±0.05 magnitude (U=2), while René Roy measured a tentative period of 48 hours (U=1). With a best-rated period of 108.5 hours, Poësia is a slow rotator. While the slowest rotators have periods above 1000 hours, the vast majority of asteroids have periods between 2.2 and 20 hours.

=== Diameter and albedo ===
According to the survey carried out by the NEOWISE mission of NASA's Wide-field Infrared Survey Explorer (WISE), and the Infrared Astronomical Satellite IRAS, Poësia measures 36.210±0.149, 39.60±0.64 and 43.75±4.6 kilometers in diameter, and its surface has a corresponding albedo of 0.097±0.008, 0.079±0.003 and 0.0627±0.015, respectively. The Collaborative Asteroid Lightcurve Link adopts the results from IRAS, that is, an albedo of 0.0627 and a diameter of 43.75 km based on an absolute magnitude of 9.8.

Further published mean-diameters and albedos by the WISE team include 33.30±10.10 km, 35.84±11.06 km, 37.604±0.255 km and 38.990±0.248 km with albedos of 0.06±0.06, 0.06±0.04, 0.097±0.008 and 0.0789±0.0085, respectively.
