= 415 Palatia =

Main-belt asteroid

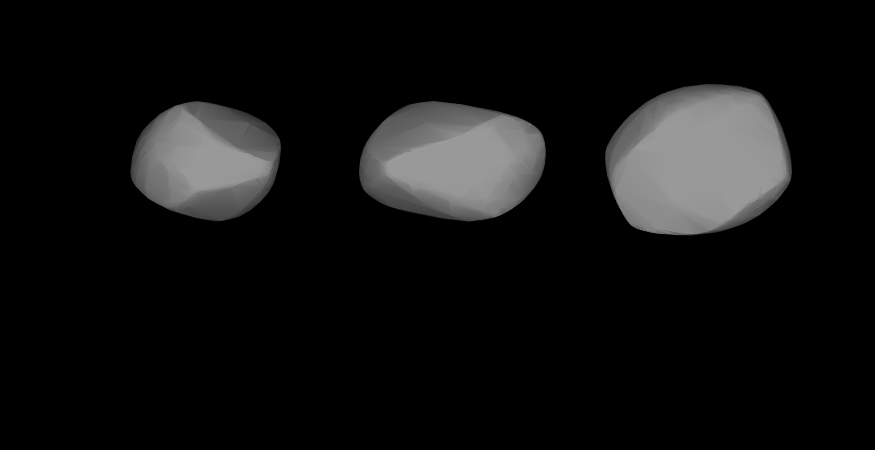
- Lightcurve-base 3D-model of 415 Palatia.

Discovery
- Discovered by: Max Wolf
- Discovery date: 7 February 1896

Designations
- Pronunciation: /pəˈleɪʃə/ pə-LAY-shə
- Named after: Electorate of the Palatinate
- Alternative designations: 1896 CO
- Minor planet category: Main belt

Orbital characteristics
- Epoch 31 July 2016 (JD 2457600.5)
- Uncertainty parameter 0
- Observation arc: 116.21 yr (42447 d)
- Aphelion: 3.6320 AU (543.34 Gm)
- Perihelion: 1.95333 AU (292.214 Gm)
- Semi-major axis: 2.7927 AU (417.78 Gm)
- Eccentricity: 0.30055
- Orbital period (sidereal): 4.67 yr (1704.6 d)
- Mean anomaly: 354.775°
- Mean motion: 0° 12^{m} 40.284^{s} / day
- Inclination: 8.1710°
- Longitude of ascending node: 126.975°
- Argument of perihelion: 297.137°

Physical characteristics
- Dimensions: 76.34±4.6 km
- Synodic rotation period: 20.73 h (0.864 d)
- Geometric albedo: 0.0628±0.008
- Spectral type: DP
- Absolute magnitude (H): 9.21

415 Palatia is a large main belt asteroid that was discovered by German astronomer Max Wolf on 7 February 1896 in Heidelberg.

10μ radiometric data collected from Kitt Peak in 1975 gave an overly large diameter estimate of 93 km. It has a very low radiometric albedo of 0.026 and the spectrum suggests a metal-rich enstatite composition.
