= 463 Lola =

Main-belt asteroid

Discovery
- Discovered by: Max Wolf
- Discovery site: Heidelberg
- Discovery date: 31 October 1900

Designations
- Alternative designations: 1900 FS; 1926 TC; 1932 FG; 1959 NR

Orbital characteristics
- Epoch 31 July 2016 (JD 2457600.5)
- Uncertainty parameter 0
- Observation arc: 115.34 yr (42127 d)
- Aphelion: 2.926666564841749 AU (437.82308634920 Gm)
- Perihelion: 1.868854585623135 AU (279.57666665715 Gm)
- Semi-major axis: 2.397760575232 AU (358.6998765031 Gm)
- Eccentricity: 0.2205833205669560
- Orbital period (sidereal): 3.71 yr (1356.1 d)
- Mean anomaly: 75.32067165114480°
- Mean motion: 0° 15^{m} 55.648^{s} / day
- Inclination: 13.54376742339310°
- Longitude of ascending node: 36.53394009335470°
- Argument of perihelion: 329.2209343525260°

Physical characteristics
- Dimensions: 19.97±1.5 km
- Synodic rotation period: 6.206 h (0.2586 d)
- Geometric albedo: 0.0829±0.014
- Spectral type: T
- Absolute magnitude (H): 11.82

463 Lola (1900 FS) is a Main-belt asteroid discovered on 31 October 1900 by Max Wolf at Heidelberg. It is named after Lola, a character from Pietro Mascagni's opera Cavalleria Rusticana.
