= 707 Steina =

Main-belt asteroid

Discovery
- Discovered by: Max Wolf
- Discovery site: Heidelberg Obs.
- Discovery date: 22 December 1910

Designations
- Alternative designations: 1910 LD

Orbital characteristics
- Epoch 31 July 2016 (JD 2457600.5)
- Uncertainty parameter 0
- Observation arc: 104.80 yr (38277 d)
- Aphelion: 2.4175 AU (361.65 Gm)
- Perihelion: 1.9433 AU (290.71 Gm)
- Semi-major axis: 2.1804 AU (326.18 Gm)
- Eccentricity: 0.10874
- Orbital period (sidereal): 3.22 yr (1176.0 d)
- Mean anomaly: 355.232°
- Mean motion: 0° 18^{m} 22.068^{s} / day
- Inclination: 4.2706°
- Longitude of ascending node: 281.961°
- Argument of perihelion: 90.548°

Physical characteristics
- Synodic rotation period: 414 h (17.3 d)
- Absolute magnitude (H): 12.1

707 Steina is a minor planet, specifically an asteroid orbiting in the asteroid belt.

The light curve of 707 Steina shows a periodicity of 414 ± 10 hours, during which time the brightness of the object varies by 1.00 ± 0.15 in magnitude.
