= 901 Brunsia =

Main-belt asteroid

Discovery
- Discovered by: Max Wolf
- Discovery site: Heidelberg
- Discovery date: 30 August 1918

Designations
- Alternative designations: 1918 EE; A905 VD; 1941 MH; 1948 VJ; 1970 EP1

Orbital characteristics
- Epoch 31 July 2016 (JD 2457600.5)
- Uncertainty parameter 0
- Observation arc: 110.41 yr (40327 days)
- Aphelion: 2.7163 AU (406.35 Gm)
- Perihelion: 1.7334 AU (259.31 Gm)
- Semi-major axis: 2.2249 AU (332.84 Gm)
- Eccentricity: 0.22090
- Orbital period (sidereal): 3.32 yr (1212.1 d)
- Mean anomaly: 190.89°
- Mean motion: 0° 17^{m} 49.2^{s} / day
- Inclination: 3.4446°
- Longitude of ascending node: 265.188°
- Argument of perihelion: 68.076°
- Earth MOID: 0.72603 AU (108.613 Gm)
- Jupiter MOID: 2.64986 AU (396.413 Gm)
- T_{Jupiter}: 3.612

Physical characteristics
- Synodic rotation period: 3.1363 h (0.13068 d)
- Absolute magnitude (H): 11.35

901 Brunsia is an S-type asteroid belonging to the Flora family in the Main Belt. Its rotation period is 3.136 hours.
