= 494 Virtus =

Large main-belt asteroid

Discovery
- Discovered by: Max Wolf
- Discovery site: Heidelberg
- Discovery date: 7 October 1902

Designations
- Pronunciation: /ˈvɜːrtəs/
- Alternative designations: 1902 JV

Orbital characteristics
- Epoch 31 July 2016 (JD 2457600.5)
- Uncertainty parameter 0
- Observation arc: 113.29 yr (41379 d)
- Aphelion: 3.1756 AU (475.06 Gm)
- Perihelion: 2.7961 AU (418.29 Gm)
- Semi-major axis: 2.9858 AU (446.67 Gm)
- Eccentricity: 0.063565
- Orbital period (sidereal): 5.16 yr (1884.5 d)
- Mean anomaly: 143.315°
- Mean motion: 0° 11^{m} 27.708^{s} / day
- Inclination: 7.0866°
- Longitude of ascending node: 38.210°
- Argument of perihelion: 218.055°

Physical characteristics
- Dimensions: 85.52±1.8 km
- Synodic rotation period: 5.57 h (0.232 d)
- Geometric albedo: 0.0630±0.003
- Spectral type: C
- Absolute magnitude (H): 8.96

494 Virtus is an 86 km minor planet orbiting the Sun. It was discovered by Max Wolf on October 7, 1902. Its provisional name was 1902 JV.
