= 577 Rhea =

Main-belt asteroid

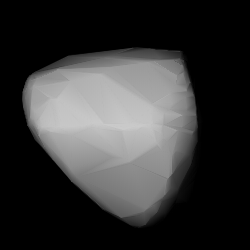
- Modelled shape of Rhea from its lightcurve

Discovery
- Discovered by: M. F. Wolf
- Discovery site: Heidelberg
- Discovery date: 20 October 1905

Designations
- Pronunciation: /ˈriːə/
- Alternative designations: 1905 RH

Orbital characteristics
- Epoch 31 July 2016 (JD 2457600.5)
- Uncertainty parameter 0
- Observation arc: 110.32 yr (40296 d)
- Aphelion: 3.5931 AU (537.52 Gm)
- Perihelion: 2.6297 AU (393.40 Gm)
- Semi-major axis: 3.1114 AU (465.46 Gm)
- Eccentricity: 0.15481
- Orbital period (sidereal): 5.49 yr (2004.6 d)
- Mean anomaly: 105.219°
- Mean motion: 0° 10^{m} 46.524^{s} / day
- Inclination: 5.2964°
- Longitude of ascending node: 328.579°
- Argument of perihelion: 330.784°

Physical characteristics
- Mean radius: 19.765±1.15 km
- Synodic rotation period: 12.249 h (0.5104 d)
- Geometric albedo: 0.1792±0.023
- Absolute magnitude (H): 9.4

577 Rhea is a minor planet orbiting the Sun. It is named after Rhea, one of the Titans in Greek mythology. The name may have been inspired by the asteroid's provisional designation 1905 RH.
