= 813 Baumeia =

Stony background asteroid

Discovery
- Discovered by: M. F. Wolf
- Discovery site: Heidelberg Obs.
- Discovery date: 28 November 1915

Designations
- Named after: H. Baum (German astronomy student)
- Alternative designations: A915 WJ · 1945 WC; 1974 QR_{2} · 1974 QY_{2} A907 GH · 1915 YR
- Minor planet category: main-belt · (inner); background

Orbital characteristics
- Epoch 31 May 2020 (JD 2459000.5)
- Uncertainty parameter 0
- Observation arc: 112.84 yr (41,213 d)
- Aphelion: 2.2813 AU
- Perihelion: 2.1646 AU
- Semi-major axis: 2.2230 AU
- Eccentricity: 0.0263
- Orbital period (sidereal): 3.31 yr (1,211 d)
- Mean anomaly: 226.31°
- Mean motion: 0° 17^{m} 50.64^{s} / day
- Inclination: 6.2970°
- Longitude of ascending node: 51.942°
- Argument of perihelion: 315.69°

Physical characteristics
- Mean diameter: 11.719±0.660 km; 13.50±1.2 km
- Synodic rotation period: 10.543±0.002 h
- Geometric albedo: 0.2027±0.040; 0.256±0.023
- Spectral type: S (MOVIS); S (SMASS-I)
- Absolute magnitude (H): 11.50; 11.70

813 Baumeia (prov. designation: A915 WJ or 1915 YR) is a stony background asteroid from the inner regions of the asteroid belt. It was discovered on 28 November 1915, by German astronomer Max Wolf at the Heidelberg Observatory in southwest Germany. The common S-type asteroid has a rotation period of 10.5 hours and measures approximately 12 kilometers (7.5 miles) in diameter. It was named for H. Baum, a German student of astronomy at Heidelberg who was killed in World War I.

== Orbit and classification ==
Baumeia is a non-family asteroid of the main belt's background population when applying the hierarchical clustering method to its proper orbital elements. It orbits the Sun in the inner main-belt at a distance of 2.2–2.3 AU once every 3 years and 4 months (1,211 days; semi-major axis of 2.22 AU). Its orbit has an eccentricity of 0.03 and an inclination of 6° with respect to the ecliptic. The body's observation arc begins with its first observation as A907 GH at Heidelberg on 4 April 1907, more than 8 years prior to its official discovery observation.

== Naming ==
This minor planet was named im memory of H. Baum, a German astronomy student at Heidelberg University who was in World War I. The naming was published in the journal Astronomische Nachrichten in 1921 (AN 214, 69). The naming was also mentioned in The Names of the Minor Planets by Paul Herget in 1955 (H 81).

== Physical characteristics ==
Baumeia is a common, stony S-type asteroid in both the SMASS-I taxonomy by Xu (1995), as well as in the taxonomic classification based on MOVIS near-infrared colors from the catalog of the VISTA Hemisphere Survey conducted with the VISTA telescope at Paranal Observatory in Chile.

=== Rotation period ===
In January 2019, a rotational lightcurve of Baumeia was obtained from photometric observations by European astronomers Bruno Christmann, Raoul Behrend, Anaël Wünsche, Marc Bretton, Rui Goncalves, Josep Bosch. Lightcurve analysis gave a well-defined rotation period of 10.543±0.002 hours with a brightness variation of 0.11±0.01 magnitude (U=3).

The result confirms and refines previous observations by French amateur astronomer René Roy in February 2003, which gave a period of 10.54±0.05 hours with an amplitude of 0.04±0.02 magnitude (U=1), by Jean-Gabriel Bosch at the French Collonges Observatory (178) in February 2006, which gave an identical period of 10.54±0.05 hours with an amplitude of 0.08±0.05 magnitude (U=1), by James W. Brinsfield at the Via Capote Observatory (G69) in Australia in November 2008, which gave the first secured period of 10.544±0.002 hours with an amplitude of 0.18±0.02 magnitude (U=3−).

=== Diameter and albedo ===
According to the surveys carried out by the NEOWISE mission of NASA's Wide-field Infrared Survey Explorer (WISE) and the Infrared Astronomical Satellite IRAS, Baumeia measures (11.719±0.660) and (13.50±1.2) kilometers in diameter and its surface has an albedo of (0.256±0.023) and (0.2027±0.040), respectively. The Collaborative Asteroid Lightcurve Link derives an albedo of 0.2396 and a diameter of 13.61 kilometers based on an absolute magnitude of 11.5. Alternative mean diameter measurements published by the WISE team include (12.408±0.071 km) and (13.45±2.95 km) with corresponding albedos of (0.2434±0.0250) and (0.30±0.19).
