= 499 Venusia =

Main-belt asteroid

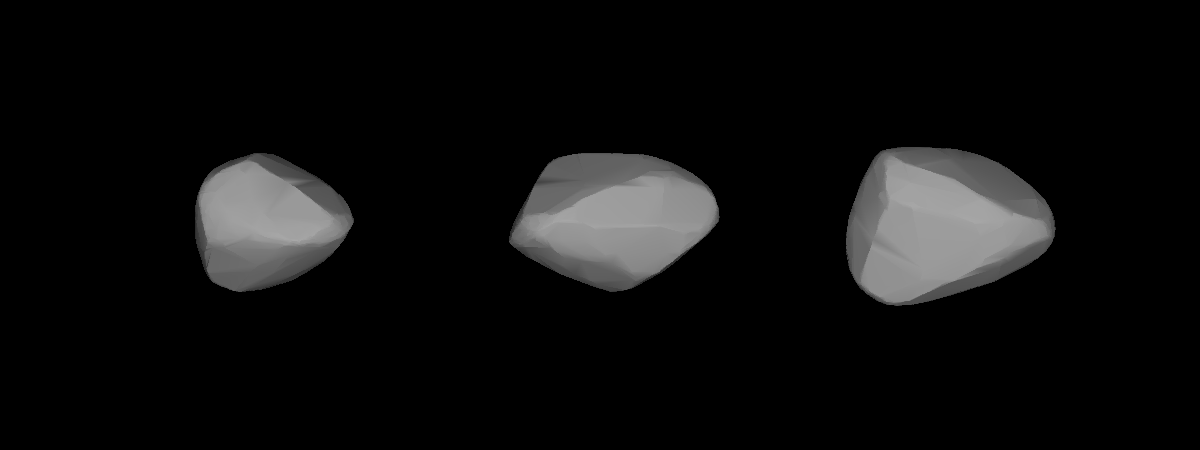
- A three-dimensional model of 499 Venusia based on its light curve

Discovery
- Discovered by: Max Wolf
- Discovery site: Heidelberg
- Discovery date: 24 December 1902

Designations
- Pronunciation: /vɪˈnjuːʃiə/
- Alternative designations: 1902 KX

Orbital characteristics
- Epoch 31 July 2016 (JD 2457600.5)
- Uncertainty parameter 0
- Observation arc: 113.31 yr (41388 d)
- Aphelion: 4.8693 AU (728.44 Gm)
- Perihelion: 3.1479 AU (470.92 Gm)
- Semi-major axis: 4.0086 AU (599.68 Gm)
- Eccentricity: 0.21471
- Orbital period (sidereal): 8.03 yr (2931.4 d)
- Mean anomaly: 149.18°
- Mean motion: 0° 7^{m} 22.116^{s} / day
- Inclination: 2.0907°
- Longitude of ascending node: 256.245°
- Argument of perihelion: 174.952°

Physical characteristics
- Mean radius: 40.69±1.65 km
- Synodic rotation period: 13.48 h (0.562 d)
- Geometric albedo: 0.0468±0.004
- Absolute magnitude (H): 9.39

499 Venusia is an asteroid in the outer asteroid belt, discovered by Max Wolf in 1902. Its diameter is 81 km (50.6 miles). It is a dark P-type asteroid. It has an average distance from the Sun of 4 AU (600 million km).
