= 674 Rachele =

Main-belt asteroid

Discovery
- Discovered by: Wilhelm Lorenz
- Discovery site: Heidelberg
- Discovery date: 28 October 1908

Designations
- Pronunciation: Italian: [raˈkɛːle]
- Alternative designations: 1908 EP

Orbital characteristics
- Epoch 31 July 2016 (JD 2457600.5)
- Uncertainty parameter 0
- Observation arc: 114.81 yr (41936 d)
- Aphelion: 3.4928 AU (522.52 Gm)
- Perihelion: 2.3488 AU (351.38 Gm)
- Semi-major axis: 2.9208 AU (436.95 Gm)
- Eccentricity: 0.19584
- Orbital period (sidereal): 4.99 yr (1823.3 d)
- Mean anomaly: 147.48°
- Mean motion: 0° 11^{m} 50.82^{s} / day
- Inclination: 13.511°
- Longitude of ascending node: 58.146°
- Argument of perihelion: 42.025°

Physical characteristics
- Mean diameter: 96.171±2.708 km
- Mass: (1.452 ± 0.709/0.29)×10^{18} kg (1.05±0.12)×10^{18} kg (Note: Calculated from its standard gravitational parameter GM = 0.070±0.008 km^{3}/s^{2}.)
- Mean density: 3.117 ± 1.522/0.623 g/cm^{3} 2.24 g/cm^{3}
- Synodic rotation period: 30.982 h (1.2909 d)
- Geometric albedo: 0.2007±0.019
- Absolute magnitude (H): 7.42

674 Rachele is a minor planet orbiting the Sun. It was discovered by Wilhelm Lorenz on 28 October 1908 in Heidelberg, and was named by orbit computer Emilio Bianchi after his wife. This is classified as an S-type asteroid, indicating a stony composition.

Measurements made using the adaptive optics system at the W. M. Keck Observatory give a size estimate of 89 km. It has a size ratio of 1.08 between the major and minor axes. By comparison, measurements reported in 1998 from the IRAS observatory give a similar size of 97 km and a ratio of 1.15.
