= 551 Ortrud =

Main-belt asteroid in the Solar System

Discovery
- Discovered by: Max Wolf
- Discovery site: Heidelberg
- Discovery date: 16 November 1904

Designations
- Pronunciation: German: [ˈɔʁtʁʊt]
- Alternative designations: 1904 PM

Orbital characteristics
- Epoch 31 July 2016 (JD 2457600.5)
- Uncertainty parameter 0
- Observation arc: 111.06 yr (40565 d)
- Aphelion: 3.3325 AU (498.53 Gm)
- Perihelion: 2.6019 AU (389.24 Gm)
- Semi-major axis: 2.9672 AU (443.89 Gm)
- Eccentricity: 0.12311
- Orbital period (sidereal): 5.11 yr (1866.9 d)
- Mean anomaly: 306.688°
- Mean motion: 0° 11^{m} 34.188^{s} / day
- Inclination: 0.39727°
- Longitude of ascending node: 6.0272°
- Argument of perihelion: 68.010°

Physical characteristics
- Mean diameter: 85 ± 11 km (pole solution 1); 86 ± 10 km (pole solution 2)
- Mass: (5.4±2.5)×10^{17} kg (Note: Calculated from its standard gravitational parameter GM = 0.036±0.017 km^{3}/s^{2}.)
- Mean density: 1.62–1.68 g/cm^{3} (calculated)
- Synodic rotation period: 17.41924 ± 0.00003 h (pole solution 1); 17.41921 ± 0.00002 h (pole solution 2)
- Pole ecliptic longitude: 149° ± 35° or 305° ± 30°
- Pole ecliptic latitude: −63° ± 9° or −66° ± 8°
- Geometric albedo: 0.040±0.009
- Absolute magnitude (H): 9.79

551 Ortrud is a minor planet orbiting the Sun. It is located in the Main Belt. In light of the practice of the discover c. 1904 to name his asteroids after female characters in opera, it is likely that Ortrud is named after a character in Richard Wagner's opera Lohengrin.
