= 833 Monica =

Main-belt asteroid

Discovery
- Discovered by: Max Wolf
- Discovery site: Heidelberg
- Discovery date: 20 September 1916

Designations
- Alternative designations: 1916 AC

Orbital characteristics
- Epoch 31 July 2016 (JD 2457600.5)
- Uncertainty parameter 0
- Observation arc: 91.86 yr (33551 d)
- Aphelion: 3.3747 AU (504.85 Gm)
- Perihelion: 2.6441 AU (395.55 Gm)
- Semi-major axis: 3.0094 AU (450.20 Gm)
- Eccentricity: 0.12138
- Orbital period (sidereal): 5.22 yr (1906.8 d)
- Mean anomaly: 21.7501°
- Mean motion: 0° 11^{m} 19.68^{s} / day
- Inclination: 9.7887°
- Longitude of ascending node: 353.163°
- Argument of perihelion: 35.937°
- Earth MOID: 1.65365 AU (247.383 Gm)
- Jupiter MOID: 2.12807 AU (318.355 Gm)
- T_{Jupiter}: 3.217

Physical characteristics
- Mean diameter: 21.2 km (13.2 mi)
- Synodic rotation period: 12.090 h (0.5038 d)
- Geometric albedo: 0.206
- Absolute magnitude (H): 11.1

833 Monica is a minor planet orbiting the Sun. Measurements of the lightcurve made in 2010 give a rotation period of 12.09 ± 0.01 hours. It has a diameter of 21.2 km.
