= 514 Armida =

Main-belt asteroid

Discovery
- Discovered by: Max Wolf
- Discovery site: Heidelberg
- Discovery date: 24 August 1903

Designations
- Alternative designations: 1903 MB
- Adjectives: Armidian

Orbital characteristics
- Epoch 31 July 2016 (JD 2457600.5)
- Uncertainty parameter 0
- Observation arc: 112.50 yr (41092 d)
- Aphelion: 3.1722 AU (474.55 Gm)
- Perihelion: 2.9197 AU (436.78 Gm)
- Semi-major axis: 3.0460 AU (455.68 Gm)
- Eccentricity: 0.041442
- Orbital period (sidereal): 5.32 yr (1941.7 d)
- Mean anomaly: 52.051°
- Mean motion: 0° 11^{m} 7.44^{s} / day
- Inclination: 3.8766°
- Longitude of ascending node: 268.633°
- Argument of perihelion: 107.727°

Physical characteristics
- Mean radius: 53.085±1.9 km
- Mass: (2.1±1.9)×10^{18} kg (Note: Calculated from its standard gravitational parameter GM = 0.14±0.13 km^{3}/s^{2}.) (SB441)
- Mean density: 3.3±3.1 g/cm^{3} (calculated)
- Synodic rotation period: 21.851 h (0.9105 d)
- Geometric albedo: 0.0379±0.003
- Absolute magnitude (H): 9.04

514 Armida is a minor planet orbiting the Sun. According to the Catalogue of Minor Planet Names and Discovery Circumstances, it is "named for the beautiful legendary sorceress in Torquato Tasso’s (1544–1595) Jerusalem Delivered. She is the leading character in the opera Armida (composed 1777) by Christoph Willibald Gluck (1714–1787)." (Numerous other composers have written "Armida" operas; see Armida.)
