= 897 Lysistrata =

Main-belt asteroid

Discovery
- Discovered by: Max Wolf
- Discovery site: Heidelberg
- Discovery date: 3 August 1918

Designations
- Pronunciation: /laɪˈsɪstrətə/
- Alternative designations: 1918 DZ

Orbital characteristics
- Epoch 31 July 2016 (JD 2457600.5)
- Uncertainty parameter 0
- Observation arc: 97.33 yr (35551 days)
- Aphelion: 2.7820 AU (416.18 Gm)
- Perihelion: 2.3016 AU (344.31 Gm)
- Semi-major axis: 2.5418 AU (380.25 Gm)
- Eccentricity: 0.094510
- Orbital period (sidereal): 4.05 yr (1480.2 d)
- Mean anomaly: 87.8819°
- Mean motion: 0° 14^{m} 35.592^{s} / day
- Inclination: 14.326°
- Longitude of ascending node: 257.977°
- Argument of perihelion: 24.460°
- Earth MOID: 1.29145 AU (193.198 Gm)
- Jupiter MOID: 2.32255 AU (347.449 Gm)
- T_{Jupiter}: 3.395

Physical characteristics
- Mean radius: 10.955±0.7 km
- Synodic rotation period: 11.26 h (0.469 d)
- Geometric albedo: 0.2619±0.036
- Absolute magnitude (H): 10.37

897 Lysistrata /laɪˈsɪstrətə/ is a minor planet orbiting the Sun that was discovered by German astronomer Max Wolf on 3 August 1918.

This is a member of the dynamic Maria family of asteroids that most likely formed as the result of a collisional breakup of a parent body.
