= 922 Schlutia =

Main-belt asteroid

Discovery
- Discovered by: K. Reinmuth
- Discovery site: Heidelberg Obs.
- Discovery date: 18 September 1919

Designations
- Named after: Edgar Schlubach; Henry Frederic Tiarks (expedition sponsors)
- Alternative designations: A919 SJ · A906 UC; 1919 FW · 1906 UC
- Minor planet category: main-belt · (middle) background

Orbital characteristics
- Epoch 31 May 2020 (JD 2459000.5)
- Uncertainty parameter 0
- Observation arc: 112.56 yr (41,114 d)
- Aphelion: 3.2117 AU
- Perihelion: 2.1667 AU
- Semi-major axis: 2.6892 AU
- Eccentricity: 0.1943
- Orbital period (sidereal): 4.41 yr (1,611 d)
- Mean anomaly: 314.34°
- Mean motion: 0° 13^{m} 24.6^{s} / day
- Inclination: 7.2999°
- Longitude of ascending node: 205.17°
- Argument of perihelion: 126.54°

Physical characteristics
- Mean diameter: 18.579±0.223 km; 18.71±0.76 km
- Synodic rotation period: 7.85683±0.00019 h
- Geometric albedo: 0.105±0.010; 0.107±0.015
- Spectral type: n.a.
- Absolute magnitude (H): 12.1

922 Schlutia (prov. designation: A919 SJ or 1919 FW) is a background asteroid from the central regions of the asteroid belt. It was discovered by German astronomer Karl Reinmuth at the Heidelberg Observatory on 18 September 1919. The asteroid with an unknown spectral type has a rotation period of 7.9 hours and measures approximately 18 kilometers (11 miles) in diameter. It was named after Edgar Schlubach and Henry Frederic Tiarks, who sponsored an expedition to observe the solar eclipse of 21 September 1922.

== Orbit and classification ==
Schlutia is a non-family asteroid of the main belt's background population when applying the hierarchical clustering method to its proper orbital elements. It orbits the Sun in the central main-belt at a distance of 2.2–3.2 AU once every 4 years and 5 months (1,611 days; semi-major axis of 2.69 AU). Its orbit has an eccentricity of 0.19 and an inclination of 7° with respect to the ecliptic. The body's observation arc begins with its first observation as A906 UC (1906 UC) at Heidelberg Observatory on 17 October 1906, almost 13 years prior to its official discovery observation.

== Naming ==
This minor planet was named after Edgar Schlubach, a German businessman from Hamburg, as well as Henry Frederic Tiarks, FRAS, British banker and amateur astronomer from London, who together financed the Dutch-German expedition to the Christmas Island to observe the solar eclipse of 21 September 1922. The asteroid was named by Schlubach and Tiarks and published in the journal Astronomische Nachrichten in 1923 (AN 218, 253). The naming was also mentioned in The Names of the Minor Planets by Paul Herget in 1955 (H 89).

== Physical characteristics ==
Schlutia's spectral type has not been determined.

=== Rotation period ===
In August 2007, a rotational lightcurve of Schlutia was obtained from photometric observations by amateur astronomers Pierre Antonini and Silvano Casulli. Lightcurve analysis gave a well-defined rotation period of 7.85683±0.00019 hours with a low brightness amplitude of 0.18±0.02 magnitude, indicative of a regular, spherical shape (U=3).

=== Diameter and albedo ===
According to the survey carried out by the NEOWISE mission of NASA's Wide-field Infrared Survey Explorer (WISE) and the Japanese Akari satellite Schlutia measures (18.579±0.223) and (18.71±0.76) kilometers in diameter and its surface has an albedo of (0.107±0.015) and (0.105±0.010), respectively. The Collaborative Asteroid Lightcurve Link assumes an intermediate albedo of 0.1 and calculates a diameter of 16.73 kilometers based on an absolute magnitude of 12.0. Further published mean-diameters by the WISE team include (13.75±3.14 km), (14.709±4.008 km), (15.081±4.465 km) and (19.228±0.221 km) with corresponding albedos of (0.12±0.06), (0.0832±0.0514), (0.0760±0.0516) and (0.1000±0.0217).
