= 553 Kundry =

Main-belt asteroid

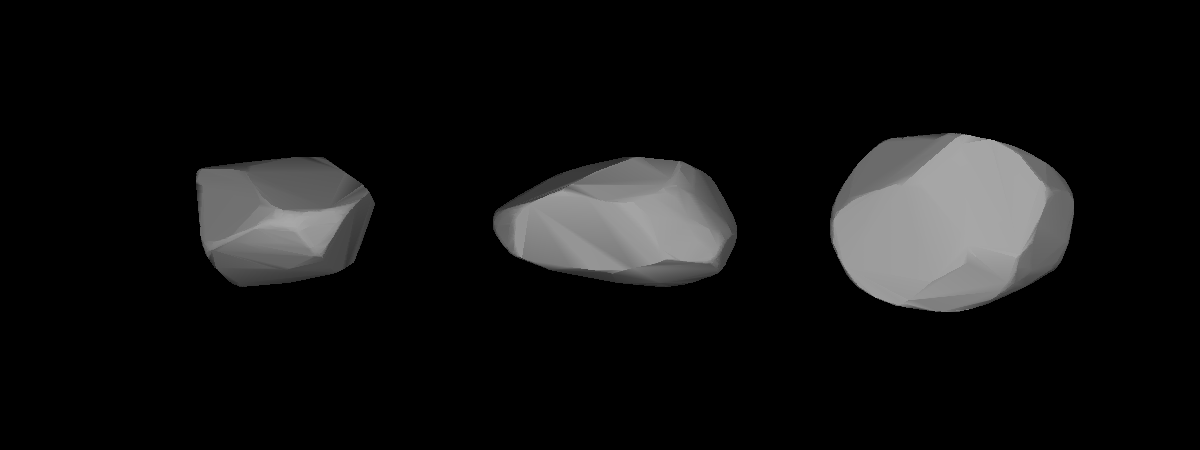
- A three-dimensional model of 553 Kundry based on its light curve

Discovery
- Discovered by: M. F. Wolf
- Discovery site: Heidelberg
- Discovery date: 27 December 1904

Designations
- Pronunciation: German: [ˈkʊndʁyː]
- Alternative designations: 1904 PP; 1932 CL; 1957 UB

Orbital characteristics
- Epoch 31 July 2016 (JD 2457600.5)
- Uncertainty parameter 0
- Observation arc: 111.31 yr (40655 d)
- Aphelion: 2.4766 AU (370.49 Gm)
- Perihelion: 1.9843 AU (296.85 Gm)
- Semi-major axis: 2.2305 AU (333.68 Gm)
- Eccentricity: 0.11035
- Orbital period (sidereal): 3.33 yr (1216.7 d)
- Mean anomaly: 191.00°
- Mean motion: 0° 17^{m} 45.168^{s} / day
- Inclination: 5.3899°
- Longitude of ascending node: 72.378°
- Argument of perihelion: 354.515°

Physical characteristics
- Synodic rotation period: 12.605 h (0.5252 d)
- Absolute magnitude (H): 12.1

553 Kundry is an S-type asteroid belonging to the Flora family in the Main Belt. Its rotation period is 12.605 hours.

Like a number of asteroids discovered by Max Wolf around this time (1904), it is named after a female character in opera, in this case from Richard Wagner's Parsifal.
