= 783 Nora =

Dark background asteroid

Discovery
- Discovered by: J. Palisa
- Discovery site: Vienna Obs.
- Discovery date: 18 March 1914

Designations
- Named after: Character of Nora Helmer in the play A Doll's House (By poet Henrik Ibsen)
- Alternative designations: A914 FB · A911 QG; 1914 UL
- Minor planet category: main-belt · (inner); background

Orbital characteristics
- Epoch 31 May 2020 (JD 2459000.5)
- Uncertainty parameter 0
- Observation arc: 108.44 yr (39,607 d)
- Aphelion: 2.8811 AU
- Perihelion: 1.8046 AU
- Semi-major axis: 2.3429 AU
- Eccentricity: 0.2297
- Orbital period (sidereal): 3.59 yr (1,310 d)
- Mean anomaly: 136.94°
- Mean motion: 0° 16^{m} 29.28^{s} / day
- Inclination: 9.3410°
- Longitude of ascending node: 142.09°
- Argument of perihelion: 154.70°

Physical characteristics
- Mean diameter: 38.719±0.105 km; 39.58±0.62 km; 40.02±0.8 km
- Synodic rotation period: 55.53±0.08 h
- Geometric albedo: 0.0635±0.003; 0.065±0.002; 0.068±0.012
- Spectral type: SMASS = C
- Absolute magnitude (H): 10.60; 11.10

783 Nora (prov. designation: A914 FB or 1914 UL) is a dark background asteroid from the inner regions of the asteroid belt. It was discovered by Austrian astronomer Johann Palisa at the Vienna Observatory on 18 March 1914. The carbonaceous C-type asteroid has a longer-than average rotation period of 55.5 hours and measures approximately 40 kilometers (25 miles) in diameter. It was likely named after Nora Helmer, principal character in the play A Doll's House by Norwegian poet Henrik Ibsen.

== Orbit and classification ==
Nora is a non-family asteroid of the main belt's background population when applying the hierarchical clustering method to its proper orbital elements. It orbits the Sun in the inner asteroid belt at a distance of 1.8–2.9 AU once every 3 years and 7 months (1,310 days; semi-major axis of 2.34 AU). Its orbit has an eccentricity of 0.23 and an inclination of 9° with respect to the ecliptic. The body's observation arc begins with its first observation as A911 QG at Heidelberg Observatory on 28 August 1911, more than two years prior to its official discovery observation at Vienna Observatory.

== Naming ==
This minor planet was likely named after Nora Helmer, the heroine in the play A Doll's House (1879) by Norwegian poet Henrik Ibsen (1828–1906). The name was given by the discoverer's friends. The naming was also mentioned in The Names of the Minor Planets by Paul Herget in 1955 (H 78).

== Physical characteristics ==
In the Bus–Binzel SMASS classification, Nora is a common, carbonaceous C-type asteroid. In the Tholen classification it is one of few asteroids considered unclassifiable.

=== Rotation period ===
In March 2018, a rotational lightcurve of Nora was obtained from photometric observations by Tom Polakis at the Command Module Observatory (V02) in Arizona. Lightcurve analysis gave a rotation period of 55.53±0.08 hours with a low brightness variation of 0.08±0.02 magnitude (U=2). The result supersedes previous observations by European astronomers at the La Silla, Haute Provence and Hoher List observatories during the 1990s which gave two periods of 24 h and 34.4±0.5 h with an amplitude of 0.2 and 0.08±0.02 magnitude, respectively (U=1/2−). In April 2007, French astronomer Arnaud Leroy determined a period of 9.6 h and a brightness variation of 0.01 magnitude (U=1).

=== Diameter and albedo ===
According to the surveys carried out by the NEOWISE mission of NASA's Wide-field Infrared Survey Explorer (WISE), the Japanese Akari satellite, and the Infrared Astronomical Satellite IRAS, Nora measures (38.719±0.105), (39.58±0.62) and (40.02±0.8) kilometers in diameter and its surface has an albedo of (0.068±0.012), (0.065±0.002) and (0.0635±0.003), respectively. The Collaborative Asteroid Lightcurve Link derives an albedo of 0.0404 and a diameter of 39.84 kilometers based on an absolute magnitude of 11.1. Alternative mean-diameter measurements published by the WISE team include (41.712±11.25 km), (42.407±0.229 km), (43.41±12.97 km), (43.43±5.49 km) and (46.96±11.00 km) with corresponding albedos of (0.0299±0.0194), (0.0565±0.0056), (0.028±0.017), (0.034±0.009) and (0.025±0.011). On 4 May 2004, an asteroid occultation of Nora gave a best-fit ellipse dimension of (40.0 km × 40.0 km), with a poor quality rating of 1. These timed observations are taken when the asteroid passes in front of a distant star.
