= 155 Scylla =

Main-belt asteroid

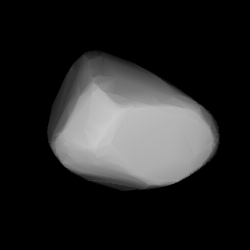
- 3D convex shape model of 155 Scylla

Discovery
- Discovered by: J. Palisa
- Discovery site: Austrian Naval Obs.
- Discovery date: 8 November 1875

Designations
- Pronunciation: /ˈsɪlə/
- Named after: Scylla (Greek mythology)
- Alternative designations: A875 VE; 1907 TJ; 1930 UN; 1930 XS; 1934 RU; 1939 TK; 1941 HL; 1950 FL; 1950 FN
- Minor planet category: main-belt · (middle) background
- Symbol: Astrological symbol for Scylla; it is the mirror of that used for 388 Charybdis

Orbital characteristics
- Epoch 23 March 2018 (JD 2458200.5)
- Uncertainty parameter 0
- Observation arc: 142.38 yr (52,004 d)
- Aphelion: 3.5207 AU
- Perihelion: 1.9916 AU
- Semi-major axis: 2.7562 AU
- Eccentricity: 0.2774
- Orbital period (sidereal): 4.58 yr (1,671 d)
- Mean anomaly: 2.9234°
- Mean motion: 0° 12^{m} 55.44^{s} / day
- Inclination: 11.388°
- Longitude of ascending node: 40.994°
- Argument of perihelion: 45.838°

Physical characteristics
- Mean diameter: 32.90±12.33 km 39.21±0.97 km 39.605±0.198 km 39.88±3.8 km 41.38±11.37 km 45.482±0.215 km
- Synodic rotation period: 7.955±0.005 h 7.958±0.002 h 7.95880±0.00005 h 7.9597±0.0001 h 7.960±0.001 h 8.8±0.6 h
- Geometric albedo: 0.0237±0.0022; 0.027±0.003; 0.03±0.01; 0.0309±0.007; 0.035±0.002; 0.05±0.03
- Spectral type: Tholen = XFC; B–V = 0.688; U–B = 0.234
- Absolute magnitude (H): 11.23; 11.39

155 Scylla is a main belt asteroid. It was discovered by Austrian astronomer Johann Palisa at the Austrian Naval Observatory on 8 November 1875, and named after the monster Scylla in Greek mythology. Two weeks after its discovery this asteroid became lost and was not recovered for 95 years. It was finally found by Paul Wild of Berne, Switzerland with the aid of an ephemeris created in 1970 by Conrad M. Bardwell at Cincinnati Observatory.

Photometric observations of this asteroid during 2008 at the Organ Mesa Observatory in Las Cruces, New Mexico, gave an asymmetrical, bimodal light curve with a period of 7.9597 ± 0.0001 hours and a brightness variation of 0.46 ± 0.03 in magnitude.
