= 964 Subamara =

Stony background asteroid

Discovery
- Discovered by: J. Palisa
- Discovery site: Vienna Obs.
- Discovery date: 27 October 1921

Designations
- Pronunciation: /sʌbəˈmɛərə/
- Named after: Latin for "very bitter" (due to light pollution)
- Alternative designations: A921 UL · A905 UL; 1921 KS · 1905 UL; 1923 NP
- Minor planet category: main-belt · (outer) background

Orbital characteristics
- Epoch 31 May 2020 (JD 2459000.5)
- Uncertainty parameter 0
- Observation arc: 114.20 yr (41,711 d)
- Aphelion: 3.4143 AU
- Perihelion: 2.6816 AU
- Semi-major axis: 3.0479 AU
- Eccentricity: 0.1202
- Orbital period (sidereal): 5.32 yr (1,944 d)
- Mean anomaly: 169.17°
- Mean motion: 0° 11^{m} 6.72^{s} / day
- Inclination: 9.0506°
- Longitude of ascending node: 30.681°
- Argument of perihelion: 9.6350°

Physical characteristics
- Mean diameter: 19.835±0.536 km; 21.23±1.17 km
- Synodic rotation period: 6.868±0.001 h
- Geometric albedo: 0.171±0.020; 0.236±0.027
- Spectral type: S (SDSS-MOC)
- Absolute magnitude (H): 10.8

964 Subamara (prov. designation: A921 UL or 1921 KS), is a stony background asteroid from the outer regions of the asteroid belt, approximately 20 kilometers (12 miles) in diameter. It was discovered by Austrian astronomer Johann Palisa at the Vienna Observatory on 27 October 1921. The S-type asteroid has a rotation period of 6.9 hours. It was named for the observatory's "very bitter" observing conditions due to light pollution.

== Orbit and classification ==
Subamara is a non-family asteroid of the main belt's background population when applying the hierarchical clustering method to its proper orbital elements. It orbits the Sun in the outer asteroid belt at a distance of 2.7–3.4 AU once every 5 years and 4 months (1,944 days; semi-major axis of 3.05 AU). Its orbit has an eccentricity of 0.12 and an inclination of 9° with respect to the ecliptic.

The asteroid was first observed as A905 UL (1905 UL) at Heidelberg Observatory in October 1905, where the body's observation arc begins a few days later on 1 November 1905, or 16 years prior to its official discovery observation at Vienna Observatory on 27 October 1921.

== Naming ==
This minor planet was named for the Latin "very bitter" (combining sub and amara), most likely referring to the increasingly poor observing conditions due to light pollution at the Vienna Observatory in the early 1920s. The author of the Dictionary of Minor Planet Names learned about the naming circumstances from A. Schnell, who found clues in an article by Palisa published in the journal Astronomische Nachrichten in 1924 (AN 222, 172). In this article, Palisa complains about the bad weather and the light pollution caused by the continued operation of arc lamps at Ringstreet in Vienna's Währing district, where the observatory is located. Remembering a particular night in August 1923, Palisa was unable to visually find asteroid 995 Sternberga with his large 27-inch telescope. When he learnt that the same asteroid was easily spotted at Heidelberg Observatory despite using a telescope with a much smaller aperture of only 12-inch, he first thought of his declining eyesight before realizing, it was due in fact to the city's increasing light pollution, and that the time has come to relocated the Vienna Observatory elsewhere.

== Physical characteristics ==
In the SDSS-based taxonomy, Subamara is a common, stony S-type asteroid.

=== Rotation period ===
Over four nights in January 2013, a rotational lightcurve of Subamara was obtained from photometric observations by Michael Alkema at the Elephant Head Observatory (G35) in Arizona. Lightcurve analysis gave a well-defined rotation period of 6.868±0.001 hours with a brightness variation of 0.25±0.02 magnitude (U=3).

James Folberth and colleges of the Rose-Hulman Institute of Technology previously observed this asteroid at Oakley Southern Sky Observatory (E09) in August 2011, finding a period of 6.864±0.004 hours with an amplitude of 0.11±0.02 magnitude (U=2). In November 2017, Tom Polakis at the Command Module Observatory (V02) in Tempe, Arizona, determined 6.8695±0.0012 hours with an amplitude of 0.12±0.03 magnitude (U=2).

=== Diameter and albedo ===
According to the survey carried out by the NEOWISE mission of NASA's Wide-field Infrared Survey Explorer and the Japanese Akari satellite, Subamara measures 19.835±0.536 and 21.23±1.17 kilometers in diameter and its surface has an albedo of 0.236±0.027 and 0.171±0.020, respectively.

An earlier published measurement by the WISE team gives larger mean-diameter of 20.266±0.505 and an albedo of 0.2264±0.0199. The Collaborative Asteroid Lightcurve Link assumes a standard albedo for a stony S-type asteroid of 0.20 and calculates a diameter of 20.56 kilometers based on an absolute magnitude of 10.8.
