= 610 Valeska =

Main-belt asteroid

Discovery
- Discovered by: Max Wolf
- Discovery site: Heidelberg
- Discovery date: 26 September 1906

Designations
- Alternative designations: 1906 VK

Orbital characteristics
- Epoch 31 July 2016 (JD 2457600.5)
- Uncertainty parameter 0
- Observation arc: 109.47 yr (39983 d)
- Aphelion: 3.8828 AU (580.86 Gm)
- Perihelion: 2.2937 AU (343.13 Gm)
- Semi-major axis: 3.0883 AU (462.00 Gm)
- Eccentricity: 0.25729
- Orbital period (sidereal): 5.43 yr (1982.3 d)
- Mean anomaly: 98.063°
- Mean motion: 0° 10^{m} 53.796^{s} / day
- Inclination: 12.699°
- Longitude of ascending node: 20.391°
- Argument of perihelion: 359.806°

Physical characteristics
- Synodic rotation period: 4.9047 h (0.20436 d)
- Absolute magnitude (H): 12.4

610 Valeska is a minor planet, specifically an asteroid, orbiting primarily in the asteroid belt. Discovered in 1906 by Max Wolf. The origin of the name is unknown, but it may be related to the provisional designation 1906 VK. In Slavic origin, it also means Glorious ruler. Photometric observations provide a rotation period of 4.9047±0.0002 h with a brightness variation of 0.17±0.03 in magnitude.
