= 474 Prudentia =

Main-belt asteroid

Discovery
- Discovered by: Max Wolf
- Discovery site: Heidelberg
- Discovery date: 13 February 1901

Designations
- Pronunciation: /pruːˈdɛnʃiə/
- Alternative designations: 1901 GD; 1929 NG; 1933 OO; A902 NA; A910 RB

Orbital characteristics
- Epoch 31 July 2016 (JD 2457600.5)
- Uncertainty parameter 0
- Observation arc: 115.17 yr (42065 d)
- Aphelion: 2.9709281 AU (444.44452 Gm)
- Perihelion: 1.9373448 AU (289.82266 Gm)
- Semi-major axis: 2.454136 AU (367.1335 Gm)
- Eccentricity: 0.2105798
- Orbital period (sidereal): 3.84 yr (1404.3 d)
- Mean anomaly: 216.99456°
- Mean motion: 0° 15^{m} 22.908^{s} / day
- Inclination: 8.798779°
- Longitude of ascending node: 161.83700°
- Argument of perihelion: 155.84500°

Physical characteristics
- Dimensions: 37.58±3.5 km
- Synodic rotation period: 8.572 h (0.3572 d)
- Geometric albedo: 0.0720±0.016
- Absolute magnitude (H): 11.0

474 Prudentia (1901 GD) is a Main-belt asteroid discovered on 13 February 1901 by Max Wolf at Heidelberg.
