= 592 Bathseba =

Main-belt asteroid

Discovery
- Discovered by: Max Wolf
- Discovery site: Heidelberg
- Discovery date: 18 March 1906

Designations
- Pronunciation: German: [batˈseːbaː]
- Alternative designations: 1906 TS

Orbital characteristics
- Epoch 4 April 2014 (JD 2456751.5)
- Uncertainty parameter 0
- Observation arc: 117.05 yr (42753 d)
- Aphelion: 3.4279 AU (512.81 Gm)
- Perihelion: 2.6339 AU (394.03 Gm)
- Semi-major axis: 3.0246 AU (452.47 Gm)
- Eccentricity: 0.12976
- Orbital period (sidereal): 5.27 yr (1924.3 d)
- Mean anomaly: 293.82°
- Mean motion: 0° 11^{m} 14.532^{s} / day
- Inclination: 10.183°
- Longitude of ascending node: 167.93°
- Argument of perihelion: 256.651°

Physical characteristics
- Mean diameter: 43.7 km
- Synodic rotation period: 7.7465 h (0.32277 d)
- Geometric albedo: 0.155
- Absolute magnitude (H): 9.61

592 Bathseba is a minor planet orbiting the Sun. In 1972, Bathseba was studied as a possible target for an extended Pioneer mission which would fly past multiple Asteroids and Comets
