= 578 Happelia =

Main-belt asteroid

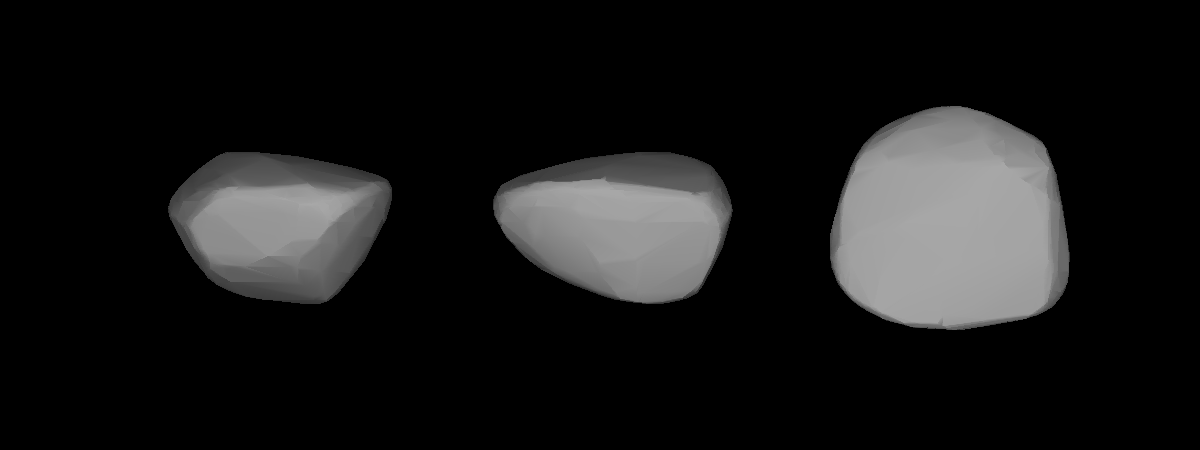
- A three-dimensional model of 578 Happelia based on its light curve

Discovery
- Discovered by: M. F. Wolf
- Discovery site: Heidelberg
- Discovery date: 1 November 1905

Designations
- Alternative designations: 1905 RZ

Orbital characteristics
- Epoch 31 July 2016 (JD 2457600.5)
- Uncertainty parameter 0
- Observation arc: 110.46 yr (40344 d)
- Aphelion: 3.2821 AU (491.00 Gm)
- Perihelion: 2.2168 AU (331.63 Gm)
- Semi-major axis: 2.7494 AU (411.30 Gm)
- Eccentricity: 0.19374
- Orbital period (sidereal): 4.56 yr (1665.2 d)
- Mean anomaly: 200.53°
- Mean motion: 0° 12^{m} 58.284^{s} / day
- Inclination: 6.1525°
- Longitude of ascending node: 29.411°
- Argument of perihelion: 261.400°

Physical characteristics
- Mean radius: 34.645±1.05 km
- Mass: (5.2±1.9)×10^{17} kg (Note: Calculated from its standard gravitational parameter GM = 0.035±0.013 km^{3}/s^{2}.)
- Mean density: 3.00 g/cm^{3} (Note: Assuming a diameter of 69.3 km.)
- Synodic rotation period: 10.061 h (0.4192 d)
- Geometric albedo: 0.0769±0.005
- Absolute magnitude (H): 9.4

578 Happelia is a minor planet orbiting the Sun. On 24 February 2017 a possible small 3-kilometer moon was found orbiting the asteroid, based on occultation observations.
