= 802 Epyaxa =

Main-belt asteroid

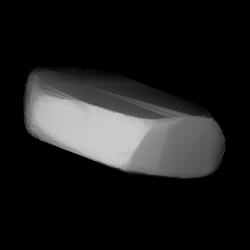
- Modelled shape of Epyaxa from its lightcurve

Discovery
- Discovered by: M. F. Wolf
- Discovery site: Heidelberg Obs.
- Discovery date: 20 March 1915

Designations
- Pronunciation: /ɛpiˈæksə/
- Named after: Epyaxa (Queen, 400 BC)
- Alternative designations: 1915 WR · 1930 YK; 1931 AX · 1970 AM_{1} 1972 XW · 1977 FG_{3}
- Minor planet category: main-belt · Flora

Orbital characteristics
- Epoch 31 July 2016 (JD 2457600.5)
- Uncertainty parameter 0
- Observation arc: 101.08 yr (36920 d)
- Aphelion: 2.3696 AU (354.49 Gm)
- Perihelion: 2.0225 AU (302.56 Gm)
- Semi-major axis: 2.1960 AU (328.52 Gm)
- Eccentricity: 0.079036
- Orbital period (sidereal): 3.25 yr (1188.7 d)
- Mean anomaly: 100.80°
- Mean motion: 0° 18^{m} 10.296^{s} / day
- Inclination: 5.2028°
- Longitude of ascending node: 7.8338°
- Argument of perihelion: 115.75°

Physical characteristics
- Dimensions: 7.423±0.193 km 7.82 km (calculated)
- Synodic rotation period: 4.392±0.002 h 4.389±0.002 h 4.394±0.005 h 4.389±0.005 h 4.389±0.001 h 4.3902±0.0006 h 4.39012±0.00005 h 4.392 h (0.1830 d)
- Geometric albedo: 0.2923±0.0802; 0.24 (assumed)
- Spectral type: S
- Absolute magnitude (H): 12.7

802 Epyaxa, provisional designation 1915 WR, is a stony Florian asteroid from the inner regions of the asteroid belt, approximately 7.5 kilometers in diameter. It was discovered by German astronomer Max Wolf at the Heidelberg Observatory in southern Germany, on 20 March 1915.

== Description ==
The S-type asteroid is a member of the Flora family, one of the largest groups of stony asteroids in the main-belt. It orbits the Sun at a distance of 2.0–2.4 AU once every 3 years and 3 months (1,189 days). Its orbit shows an eccentricity of 0.08 and is tilted by 5 degrees to the plane of the ecliptic. From 2009 to 2014, seven photometric lightcurve analysis rendered a well-defined, concurring rotation period of 4.39 hours (also see adjunct infobox).

According to the survey carried out by the U.S. Wide-field Infrared Survey Explorer with its NEOWISE mission, the asteroid's surface has a relatively high albedo of 0.29. The Collaborative Asteroid Lightcurve Link assumes a more moderate value of 0.24, which is also identical to the albedo of the Flora family's namesake, the asteroid 8 Flora.

This minor planet was named after Epyaxa (Ἐπύαξα), wife of King Syennesis and queen of the Kingdom of Cilicia in South Asia Minor in the 5th century BCE. The couple supported the revolt of Cyrus the Younger against his brother Artaxerxes II of Persia, after whom the minor planet 7212 Artaxerxes is named. Epyaxa had her own army and her own lavish budget to spend. Her Kingdom lost its independence and became a Persian satrapy of the Achaemenid Empire after the defeat of Cyrus.
