= 573 Recha =

Minor planet orbiting in the asteroid belt

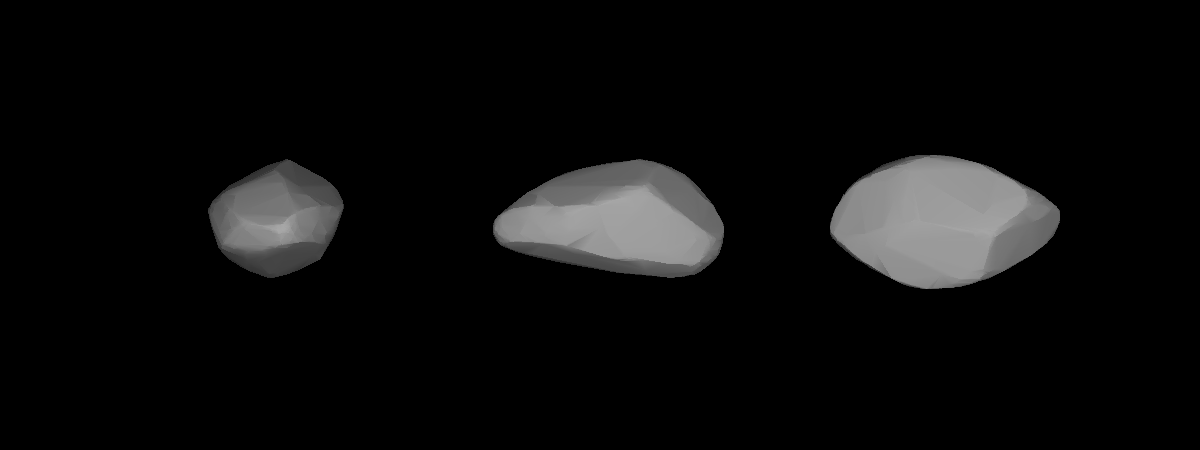
- A three-dimensional model of 573 Recha based on its light curve

Discovery
- Discovered by: M. F. Wolf
- Discovery site: Heidelberg
- Discovery date: 19 September 1905

Designations
- Pronunciation: /ˈriːkə/, German: [ˈʁeːçaː]
- Alternative designations: 1905 RC

Orbital characteristics
- Epoch 31 July 2016 (JD 2457600.5)
- Uncertainty parameter 0
- Observation arc: 110.43 yr (40335 d)
- Aphelion: 3.3562 AU (502.08 Gm)
- Perihelion: 2.6689 AU (399.26 Gm)
- Semi-major axis: 3.0125 AU (450.66 Gm)
- Eccentricity: 0.11407
- Orbital period (sidereal): 5.23 yr (1909.8 d)
- Mean anomaly: 55.621°
- Mean motion: 0° 11^{m} 18.6^{s} / day
- Inclination: 9.8334°
- Longitude of ascending node: 342.959°
- Argument of perihelion: 28.910°

Physical characteristics
- Mean radius: 24.00±1.9 km
- Synodic rotation period: 7.15 h 7.16633 h (0.298597 d)
- Geometric albedo: 0.1109±0.020
- Absolute magnitude (H): 9.5

573 Recha is a minor planet, specifically an asteroid orbiting in the asteroid belt between Mars and Jupiter. The asteroid, discovered by German astronomer Max Wolf on 19 September 1905, was named after a character in Gotthold Ephraim Lessing's play Nathan the Wise and may have been inspired by the asteroid's provisional designation 1905 RC.

Photometric observations at the Palmer Divide Observatory in Colorado Springs, Colorado from 2001 to 2006 were used to build a light curve for this object. The asteroid displayed a rotation period of 7.15 ± 0.01 hours and a brightness variation of 0.20 ± 0.02 in magnitude.

This is a member of the dynamic Eos family of asteroids that most likely formed as the result of a collisional breakup of a parent body.

Between 2005 and 2022, 573 Recha has been observed to occult four stars.
