= 641 Agnes =

Main-belt asteroid

Discovery
- Discovered by: M. F. Wolf
- Discovery site: Heidelberg Obs.
- Discovery date: 8 September 1907

Designations
- Pronunciation: /ˈæɡnɪs/, German: [ˈaːɡnɛs, ˈaŋnəs]
- Named after: unknown
- Alternative designations: 1907 ZX · 1952 FD_{1}
- Minor planet category: main-belt · Flora

Orbital characteristics
- Epoch 16 February 2017 (JD 2457800.5)
- Uncertainty parameter 0
- Observation arc: 109.38 yr (39,951 days)
- Aphelion: 2.5055 AU
- Perihelion: 1.9346 AU
- Semi-major axis: 2.2200 AU
- Eccentricity: 0.1286
- Orbital period (sidereal): 3.31 yr (1,208 days)
- Mean anomaly: 335.75°
- Mean motion: 0° 17^{m} 52.8^{s} / day
- Inclination: 1.7119°
- Longitude of ascending node: 41.020°
- Argument of perihelion: 17.704°

Physical characteristics
- Dimensions: 8.26±1.42 km 8.81 km (calculated); 9±2 km 9.24±0.64 km 9.446±0.166 km 9.74±2.66 km
- Synodic rotation period: 8.9 h 178.0±0.1 h
- Geometric albedo: 0.20±0.07; 0.21±0.15; 0.217±0.043; 0.299±0.044; 0.30±0.11
- Spectral type: V–R = 0.500±0.050; S
- Absolute magnitude (H): 12.10 · 12.40 · 12.5 · 12.61 · 12.64±0.05 · 12.72±0.16

641 Agnes, provisional designation 1907 ZX, is a stony Florian asteroid and slow rotator from the inner regions of the asteroid belt, approximately 9 kilometers (6 mi) in diameter.

It was discovered on 8 September 1907, by German astronomer Max Wolf at Heidelberg Observatory in southern Germany. The meaning of the asteroids's name is unknown.

== Classification and orbit ==
Agnes is a stony S-type asteroid and a member of the Flora family, one of the largest groups of stony asteroids in the asteroid belt. It orbits the Sun in the inner main-belt at a distance of 1.9–2.5 AU once every 3 years and 4 months (1,208 days). Its orbit has an eccentricity of 0.13 and an inclination of 2° with respect to the ecliptic. The body's observation arc begins with a recovered observation at Vienna Observatory, one month after its official discovery observation at Heidelberg.

== Physical characteristics ==
=== Rotation period ===
In March 1975, photometric observations by Swedish astronomer Claes-Ingvar Lagerkvist measured a period of 8.9 hours for Agnes. The lightcurve, however, was fragmentary and the result uncertain (U=1).

In October 2013, the first reliable rotational lightcurve of Agnes was obtained by astronomers Frederick Pilcher, Lorenzo Franco and Luis Martinez at Organ Mesa (G50) and Balzaretto Observatory (A81) respectively. Lightcurve analysis gave a well-defined rotation period of 178.0 hours with a brightness variation of 0.55 magnitude (U=3). The team also assumed a standard albedo for stony S-type asteroids of 0.20, calculated an absolute magnitude of 12.64, estimated a mean diameter of 9±2 kilometers, and measured a V–R color index of 0.50.

With such a long rotation period, Agnes is a slow rotator, of which a few hundred minor planets are currently known.

=== Diameter and albedo ===
According to the surveys carried out by the Japanese Akari satellite and NASA's Wide-field Infrared Survey Explorer with its subsequent NEOWISE mission, Agnes measures between 8.26 and 9.74 kilometers (5.13 and 6.05 mi) in diameter, and its surface has an albedo between 0.21 and 0.30. The Collaborative Asteroid Lightcurve Link adopts the results obtained by Pilcher, and calculates a diameter of 8.81 kilometers.

== Naming ==
Any reference of this minor planet's name to a person or occurrence is unknown.

=== Unknown meaning ===
Among the many thousands of named minor planets, Agnes is one of 120 asteroids, for which no official naming citation has been published. All of these low-numbered asteroids have numbers between 164 Eva and 1514 Ricouxa and were discovered between 1876 and the 1930s, predominantly by astronomers Auguste Charlois, Johann Palisa, Max Wolf and Karl Reinmuth.
