= 574 Reginhild =

Main-belt asteroid

Discovery
- Discovered by: M. F. Wolf
- Discovery site: Heidelberg
- Discovery date: 19 September 1905

Designations
- Pronunciation: German: [ˈʁeːɡɪnhɪlt]
- Alternative designations: 1905 RD

Orbital characteristics
- Epoch 31 July 2016 (JD 2457600.5)
- Uncertainty parameter 0
- Observation arc: 109.81 yr (40109 d)
- Aphelion: 2.7924 AU (417.74 Gm)
- Perihelion: 1.7120 AU (256.11 Gm)
- Semi-major axis: 2.2522 AU (336.92 Gm)
- Eccentricity: 0.23985
- Orbital period (sidereal): 3.38 yr (1234.6 d)
- Mean anomaly: 249.806°
- Mean motion: 0° 17^{m} 29.76^{s} / day
- Inclination: 5.6840°
- Longitude of ascending node: 336.810°
- Argument of perihelion: 76.710°

Physical characteristics
- Mean radius: 3.73±0.25 km
- Synodic rotation period: 14.339 h (0.5975 d)
- Geometric albedo: 0.3819±0.057
- Absolute magnitude (H): 12.30

574 Reginhild is a minor planet orbiting the Sun that was discovered by German astronomer Max Wolf on September 19, 1905. The name may have been inspired by the asteroid's provisional designation 1905 RD.

Photometric observations of this asteroid at the Organ Mesa Observatory in Las Cruces, New Mexico during 2010 gave a light curve with a period of 14.339 ± 0.001 hours and a brightness variation of 0.17 ± 0.02 in magnitude. The light curve shows three uneven minimums and maximums per rotation cycle.
