= 774 Armor =

Main-belt asteroid

Discovery
- Discovered by: C. le Morvan
- Discovery site: Paris
- Discovery date: 19 December 1913

Designations
- Alternative designations: 1913 TW

Orbital characteristics
- Epoch 31 July 2016 (JD 2457600.5)
- Uncertainty parameter 0
- Observation arc: 107.33 yr (39203 d)
- Aphelion: 3.5625 AU (532.94 Gm)
- Perihelion: 2.5318 AU (378.75 Gm)
- Semi-major axis: 3.0472 AU (455.85 Gm)
- Eccentricity: 0.16914
- Orbital period (sidereal): 5.32 yr (1942.9 d)
- Mean anomaly: 240.634°
- Mean motion: 0° 11^{m} 7.044^{s} / day
- Inclination: 5.5589°
- Longitude of ascending node: 250.253°
- Argument of perihelion: 28.478°
- Earth MOID: 1.51688 AU (226.922 Gm)
- Jupiter MOID: 1.56651 AU (234.347 Gm)
- T_{Jupiter}: 3.209

Physical characteristics
- Mean radius: 25.185±0.95 km
- Synodic rotation period: 25.107 h (1.0461 d)
- Geometric albedo: 0.2529±0.020
- Absolute magnitude (H): 8.8

774 Armor is a minor planet (specifically an asteroid) orbiting in the main belt. It was discovered on 13 December 1913, in Paris by French astronomer Charles le Morvan and was named after the Celtic region of Armorica. The asteroid is orbiting at a distance of 3.05 AU with a period of 5.32 yr and an eccentricity of 0.169. The orbital plane is inclined by an angle of 5.56° to the plane of the ecliptic.

In the SMASS-I taxonomy, this is classified as an S-type asteroid. It spans a girth of approximately 50 km. The rotation of this asteroid is commensurate with the length of an Earth day, requiring measurements from more than one latitude for full coverage. Photometric observations from the US and Australia in 2012 provided an estimated rotation period of 25.107±0.005 h with a brightness variation of 0.16±0.02 in magnitude. This is consistent with the results of an earlier study in 2006.
