= 492 Gismonda =

Main-belt asteroid

Discovery
- Discovered by: Max Wolf
- Discovery site: Heidelberg Observatory
- Discovery date: 3 September 1902

Designations
- Pronunciation: /dʒɪzˈmɒndə/
- Alternative designations: 1902 JR

Orbital characteristics
- Epoch 31 July 2016 (JD 2457600.5)
- Uncertainty parameter 0
- Observation arc: 113.62 yr (41499 d)
- Aphelion: 3.6662 AU (548.46 Gm)
- Perihelion: 2.5610 AU (383.12 Gm)
- Semi-major axis: 3.1136 AU (465.79 Gm)
- Eccentricity: 0.17747
- Orbital period (sidereal): 5.49 yr (2,006.7 d)
- Mean anomaly: 267.617°
- Mean motion: 0° 10^{m} 45.84^{s} / day
- Inclination: 1.6188°
- Longitude of ascending node: 46.215°
- Argument of perihelion: 296.611°

Physical characteristics
- Mean radius: 25.845±0.7 km
- Mass: (4.5±1.8)×10^{17} kg (Note: Calculated from its standard gravitational parameter GM = 0.030±0.012 km^{3}/s^{2}.)
- Mean density: 5.72 g/cm^{3} (Note: Assuming a diameter of 53.4 km.)
- Synodic rotation period: 6.488 h (0.2703 d)
- Geometric albedo: 0.0795±0.005
- Absolute magnitude (H): 9.9

492 Gismonda is a main belt asteroid discovered by German astronomer Max Wolf in 1902. Gismonda is named after the daughter of Tancred, prince of Salerno, from Giovanni Boccaccio's work, The Decameron. It is orbiting 3.11 AU (466 Gm) from the Sun with a period of 5.49 yr and an orbital eccentricity (ovalness) of 0.18. The orbital plane is inclined at an angle of 1.6° to the plane of the ecliptic.

This asteroid is a member of the Themis collisional family, which is one of the largest such groups in the belt. It has an estimated diameter of 50.3±1.1 km. The spectrum suggests the surface is covered with a fine grained silicate mantle. Photometric observations of Gismonda made in 1902 produce a light curve displaying a rotation period of 6.488±0.005 h with a brightness variation of 0.16±0.02 in magnitude
