= 332 Siri =

Main belt asteroid

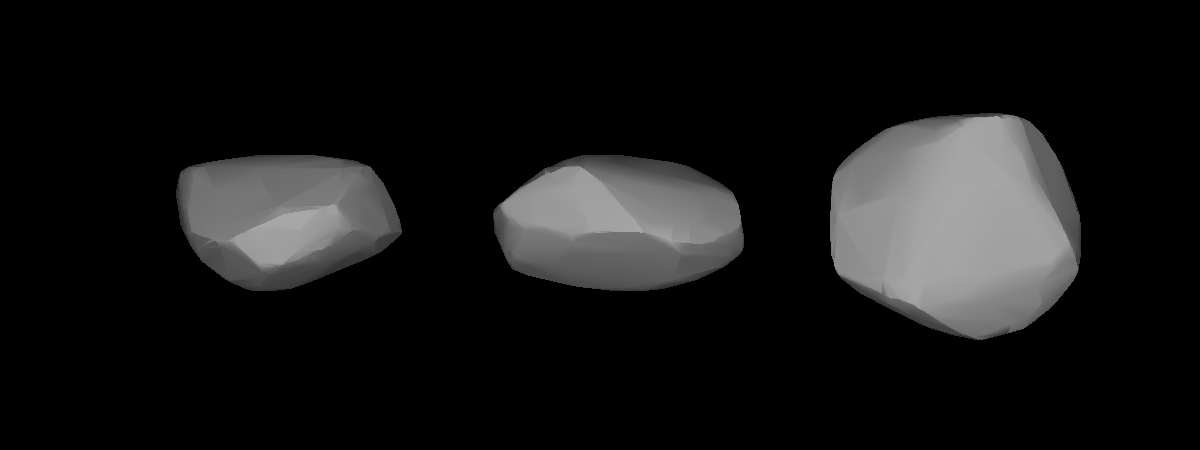
- Lightcurve-based 3D model of 332 Siri

Discovery
- Discovered by: Max Wolf
- Discovery site: Heidelberg
- Discovery date: 19 March 1892

Designations
- Alternative designations: A896 BA, A922 XA
- Minor planet category: Main belt

Orbital characteristics
- Epoch 31 July 2016 (JD 2457600.5)
- Uncertainty parameter 0
- Observation arc: 124.05 yr (45308 d)
- Aphelion: 3.0216 AU (452.02 Gm)
- Perihelion: 2.5269 AU (378.02 Gm)
- Semi-major axis: 2.7742 AU (415.01 Gm)
- Eccentricity: 0.089172
- Orbital period (sidereal): 4.62 yr (1687.8 d)
- Mean anomaly: 186.290°
- Mean motion: 0° 12^{m} 47.88^{s} / day
- Inclination: 2.8473°
- Longitude of ascending node: 31.575°
- Argument of perihelion: 296.463°

Physical characteristics
- Dimensions: 40.37±1.8 km
- Mass: (4.0±1.6)×10^{17} kg (Note: Calculated from its standard gravitational parameter GM = 0.027±0.011 km^{3}/s^{2}.)
- Mean density: 11.79 g/cm^{3}
- Synodic rotation period: 8.0074 h (0.33364 d)
- Geometric albedo: 0.1719±0.017
- Absolute magnitude (H): 9.7, 9.65

332 Siri is a main belt asteroid in orbit around the Sun. It was discovered by German astronomer Max Wolf on 19 March 1892 in Heidelberg. The origin of this asteroid's name is unclear. On October 5, 2092, 332 Siri will pass 4,981,670 km (3,095,470 mi) from the asteroid 29 Amphitrite with a relative velocity of 2.054 kilometers per second.
