= 665 Sabine =

Main-belt asteroid

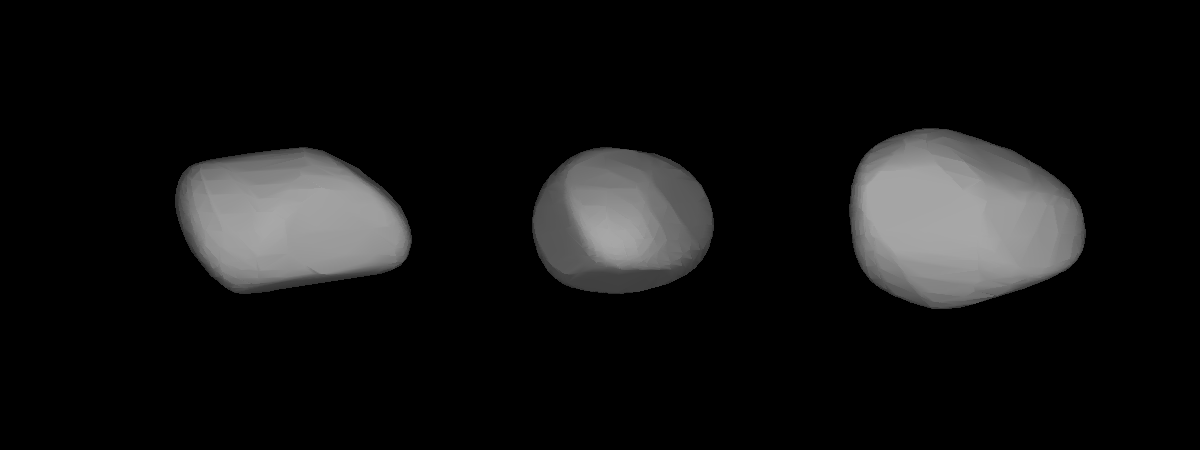
- A three-dimensional model of 665 Sabine based on its light curve

Discovery
- Discovered by: W. Lorenz
- Discovery site: Heidelberg
- Discovery date: 22 July 1908

Designations
- Pronunciation: German: [zaːˈbiːnə]
- Alternative designations: 1908 DK
- Adjectives: Sabinian /səˈbɪniən/

Orbital characteristics
- Epoch 31 July 2016 (JD 2457600.5)
- Uncertainty parameter 0
- Observation arc: 110.08 yr (40208 d)
- Aphelion: 3.6830 AU (550.97 Gm)
- Perihelion: 2.6053 AU (389.75 Gm)
- Semi-major axis: 3.1442 AU (470.37 Gm)
- Eccentricity: 0.17139
- Orbital period (sidereal): 5.58 yr (2036.4 d)
- Mean anomaly: 149.933°
- Mean motion: 0° 10^{m} 36.444^{s} / day
- Inclination: 14.740°
- Longitude of ascending node: 298.436°
- Argument of perihelion: 318.920°

Physical characteristics
- Mean radius: 25.545±1.2 km 26.355 ± 0.36 km
- Mass: (6.98 ± 3.98) × 10^{17} kg
- Synodic rotation period: 4.294 h (0.1789 d)
- Geometric albedo: 0.3895±0.039
- Absolute magnitude (H): 9.29, 8.7

665 Sabine is a minor planet orbiting the Sun that was discovered by German astronomer Wilhelm Lorenz on July 22, 1908.

Photometric observations of this asteroid at the Oakley Observatory in Terre Haute, Indiana during 2006 gave a light curve with a period of 4.294 ± 0.001 hours and a brightness variation of 0.50 ± 0.04 in magnitude.
