= 386 Siegena =

Main-belt asteroid

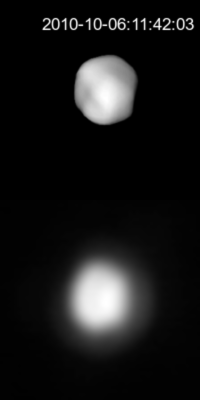
- Lightcurve-base 3D-model of Siegena on the top with an image of the asteroid on the bottom.

Discovery
- Discovered by: Max Wolf
- Discovery date: 1 March 1894

Designations
- Pronunciation: /ˈsiːɡənə/ SEE-gə-nə
- Named after: Siegen
- Alternative designations: 1894 AY
- Minor planet category: Main belt
- Adjectives: Siegenian /siːˈɡɛniən/ see-GHEN-ee-ən

Orbital characteristics
- Epoch 31 July 2016 (JD 2457600.5)
- Uncertainty parameter 0
- Observation arc: 122.08 yr (44590 d)
- Aphelion: 3.38983 AU (507.111 Gm)
- Perihelion: 2.40159 AU (359.273 Gm)
- Semi-major axis: 2.89571 AU (433.192 Gm)
- Eccentricity: 0.17064
- Orbital period (sidereal): 4.93 yr (1799.8 d)
- Mean anomaly: 66.7510°
- Mean motion: 0° 12^{m} 0.068^{s} / day
- Inclination: 20.2568°
- Longitude of ascending node: 166.886°
- Argument of perihelion: 219.478°

Physical characteristics
- Dimensions: 167±5 km
- Mass: (3.96±0.55)×10^{18} kg (Note: Calculated from its standard gravitational parameter GM = 0.264±0.037 km^{3}/s^{2}.)
- Mean density: 1.62±0.27 g/cm^{3}
- Synodic rotation period: 9.765030 h (0.4068763 d)
- Pole ecliptic longitude: 287° ± 2°
- Pole ecliptic latitude: 26° ± 3°
- Geometric albedo: 0.0692±0.002
- Spectral type: C
- Absolute magnitude (H): 7.74

386 Siegena is a very large main-belt asteroid. It is classified as a C-type asteroid and is probably composed of primitive carbonaceous material.

It was discovered by Max Wolf on March 1, 1894, in Heidelberg.

During 1999, the asteroid was observed occulting a star. The resulting chords provided a diameter estimate of 174 km.
