= 943 Begonia =

Main-belt asteroid

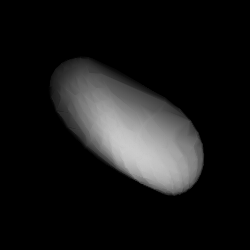
- Modelled shape of Begonia from its lightcurve

Discovery
- Discovered by: K. Reinmuth
- Discovery site: Heidelberg Obs.
- Discovery date: 20 October 1920

Designations
- Pronunciation: /bɪˈɡoʊniə/
- Named after: Begonia (genus of flowers)
- Alternative designations: A920 UA · 1944 DM; 1947 RC · 1977 FU; 1920 HX
- Minor planet category: main-belt · (outer) background

Orbital characteristics
- Epoch 31 May 2020 (JD 2459000.5)
- Uncertainty parameter 0
- Observation arc: 99.21 yr (36,237 d)
- Aphelion: 3.7814 AU
- Perihelion: 2.4517 AU
- Semi-major axis: 3.1166 AU
- Eccentricity: 0.2133
- Orbital period (sidereal): 5.50 yr (2,010 d)
- Mean anomaly: 310.58°
- Mean motion: 0° 10^{m} 44.76^{s} / day
- Inclination: 12.108°
- Longitude of ascending node: 113.77°
- Argument of perihelion: 4.1314°

Physical characteristics
- Mean diameter: 69.21±3.0 km; 69.30±1.23 km; 70.572±2.446 km
- Synodic rotation period: 15.660±0.001 h
- Geometric albedo: 0.044±0.005; 0.0456±0.004; 0.047±0.002
- Spectral type: Tholen = ST; X (S3OS2–TH); Ch (S3OS2–BB); C (SDSS-MOC); B–V = 0.783±0.033
- Absolute magnitude (H): 9.8

943 Begonia /bɪˈɡoʊniə/ is a large, carbonaceous background asteroid, approximately 70 kilometers (43 miles) in diameter, from the outer region of the asteroid belt. It was discovered by German astronomer Karl Reinmuth at the Heidelberg Observatory on 20 October 1920 and given the provisional designations A920 UA and 1920 HX. The dark C-type asteroid (Ch) has a rotation period of 15.7 hours. It was named after the genus of popular houseplants, Begonia.

== Orbit and classification ==
Begonia is a non-family asteroid of the main belt's background population when applying the hierarchical clustering method to its proper orbital elements. It orbits the Sun in the outer asteroid belt at a distance of 2.5–3.8 AU once every 5 years and 6 months (2,010 days; semi-major axis of 3.12 AU). Its orbit has an eccentricity of 0.21 and an inclination of 12° with respect to the ecliptic. The body's observation arc begins at Heidelberg Observatory on 21 October 1920, the night after its official discovery observation.

== Naming ==
This minor planet was named after the genus of tropical herbs, Begonia. These flowering plants belongs to the Begoniaceae family and are popular houseplants, widely cultivated as ornamentals. The naming was mentioned in The Names of the Minor Planets by Paul Herget in 1955 (H 91). Only a minority of minor planets are named after plants.

=== Reinmuth's flowers ===
Due to his many discoveries, Karl Reinmuth submitted a large list of 66 newly named asteroids in the early 1930s. The list covered his discoveries with numbers between (1009) and (1200). This list also contained a sequence of 28 asteroids, that were all named after plants, in particular flowering plants (also see list of minor planets named after animals and plants).

== Physical characteristics ==
In the SDSS-based taxonomy, Begonia is a common carbonaceous C-type asteroid, while in the Tholen classification, it is a stony S-type, somewhat similar to the dark and rare T-type asteroids. Alternatively, in the Small Solar System Objects Spectroscopic Survey (S3OS2), it is classified as an X-type in the survey's Tholen-like taxonomy, and as a hydrated carbonaceous Ch-subtype in the SMASS-like taxonomic variant (Bus–Binzel) of the survey.

=== Rotation period ===
In March 2005, a rotational lightcurve of Begonia was obtained from photometric observations by French amateur astronomers Laurent Bernasconi, Raymond Poncy and Silvano Casulli. Lightcurve analysis gave a well-defined rotation period of 15.660±0.001 hours (0.6525 days) with a brightness variation of 0.35±0.01 magnitude (U=3). An identical period of 15.66±0.05 hours with an amplitude of 0.24±0.01 magnitude was measured by their colleague René Roy in May 2011 (U=2). In February 2016, Jean-Paul Godard and Frédéric Bergero also determined a period of 15.7±0.5 hours and an amplitude of 0.36±0.05 magnitude (U=2−).

=== Diameter and albedo ===
According to the surveys carried out by the Infrared Astronomical Satellite IRAS, the Japanese Akari satellite, and the NEOWISE mission of NASA's Wide-field Infrared Survey Explorer (WISE), Begonia measures 69.21±3.0, 69.30±1.23 and 70.572±2.446 kilometers in diameter, and its surface has an albedo of 0.0456±0.004, 0.047±0.002 and 0.044±0.005, respectively. The Collaborative Asteroid Lightcurve Link adopts the results from IRAS, that is, an albedo of 0.0456 and a diameter of 69.21 km based on an absolute magnitude of 9.77.

Further published mean-diameters and albedos by the WISE team include 63.24±0.29 km, 67.593±21.21 km, and 72.379±0.833 km with corresponding albedos of 0.04±0.01, 0.0358±0.0453, and 0.0288±0.0028. An asteroid occultation on 25 March 2005, gave a best-fit ellipse dimension of 69.0 × 69.0 kilometers. These timed observations are taken when the asteroid passes in front of a distant star. However the quality of the measurement is poorly rated.

943 Begonia has been observed to occult 6 stars between 2005 and 2023.
