= 908 Buda =

Main-belt asteroid

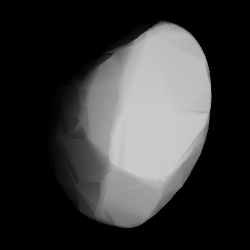
- Modelled shape of Buda from its lightcurve

Discovery
- Discovered by: M. F. Wolf
- Discovery site: Heidelberg Obs.
- Discovery date: 30 November 1918

Designations
- Pronunciation: /ˈbuːdə/
- Named after: Buda, part of the Hungarian city of Budapest
- Alternative designations: A918 WD · 1963 ME; 1918 EX
- Minor planet category: main-belt · (inner) background

Orbital characteristics
- Epoch 31 May 2020 (JD 2459000.5)
- Uncertainty parameter 0
- Observation arc: 101.18 yr (36,957 d)
- Aphelion: 2.8390 AU
- Perihelion: 2.1072 AU
- Semi-major axis: 2.4731 AU
- Eccentricity: 0.1480
- Orbital period (sidereal): 3.89 yr (1,421 d)
- Mean anomaly: 357.41°
- Mean motion: 0° 15^{m} 12.24^{s} / day
- Inclination: 13.415°
- Longitude of ascending node: 85.551°
- Argument of perihelion: 23.523°

Physical characteristics
- Mean diameter: 24.37±1.1 km; 28.29±0.61 km; 30.749±0.492 km
- Synodic rotation period: 14.572±0.005 h (Note: Lightcurve plot of (908) Buda, Palmer Divide Observatory, B. D. Warner (2009) rotation period hours with a brightness amplitude of mag. Quality code of XYZ. Summary figures at the LCDB.)
- Pole ecliptic latitude: (40.0°, 5.0°) (λ_{1}/β_{1}); (225.0°, 16.0°) (λ_{2}/β_{2})
- Geometric albedo: 0.087±0.007; 0.118±0.006; 0.1576±0.015
- Spectral type: SMASS = L; D (Bus–DeMeo); B–V = 0.820±0.020; U–B = 0.350±0.030
- Absolute magnitude (H): 10.8

908 Buda (prov. designation: A918 WD or 1918 EX) is a background asteroid from the inner regions of the asteroid belt, approximately 30 kilometers (19 miles) in diameter. It was discovered by German astronomer Max Wolf at the Heidelberg Observatory on 30 November 1918. The uncommon L-type asteroid has a rotation period of 14.6 hours. It was named after Buda, the smaller part of the Hungarian city of Budapest.

== Orbit and classification ==
Buda is a non-family asteroid of the main belt's background population when applying the hierarchical clustering method to its proper orbital elements. It orbits the Sun in the inner asteroid belt at a distance of 2.1–2.8 AU once every 3 years and 11 months (1,421 days; semi-major axis of 2.47 AU). Its orbit has an eccentricity of 0.15 and an inclination of 13° with respect to the ecliptic. The body's observation arc begins at Heidelberg Observatory with its official discovery observation on 30 November 1918.

== Naming ==
This minor planet was named after Buda, the smaller part of the Hungarian capital city of Budapest (the larger part being Pest). It is located on the west bank of the Danube River. The asteroid's naming citation was mentioned in The Names of the Minor Planets by Paul Herget in 1955 (H 88).

== Physical characteristics ==
In the Bus–Binzel SMASS classification, Buda is an uncommon L-type, while in the Bus–DeMeo taxonomy, it is a D-type asteroid.

=== Rotation period and poles ===
In March 2009, a rotational lightcurve of Buda was obtained from photometric observations by Brian Warner at his Palmer Divide Observatory (716) in Colorado. Analysis gave a classically shaped bimodal lightcurve with a rotation period of 14.572±0.005 hours and a brightness variation of 0.29±0.02 magnitude (U=3). This supersedes a period determination by French amateur astronomer Laurent Bernasconi from January 2005, who determined a period of 14.575±0.003 hours with an amplitude of 0.41±0.03 magnitude (U=2+). Observations by Julian Oey in 2015 gave two similar periods (U=2/2).

In 2016, a modeled lightcurve using photometric data from various sources of an international collaboration of astronomers, rendered a concurring sidereal period of 14.57498±0.00005 and two spin axes of (40.0°, 5.0°) and (225.0°, 16.0°) in ecliptic coordinates (λ, β).

=== Diameter and albedo ===
According to the survey carried out by the Infrared Astronomical Satellite IRAS, the Japanese Akari satellite, and the NEOWISE mission of NASA's Wide-field Infrared Survey Explorer (WISE), Buda measures (24.37±1.1), (28.29±0.61) and (30.749±0.492) kilometers in diameter and its surface has an albedo of (0.1576±0.015), (0.118±0.006) and (0.087±0.007), respectively. The Collaborative Asteroid Lightcurve Link derives an albedo of 0.1509 and calculates a diameter of 24.33 kilometers based on an absolute magnitude of 10.74. Alternative mean-diameter measurements published by the WISE team include (29.73±8.24 km) and (36.268±8.535 km) with corresponding albedos of (0.10±0.06) and (0.0859±0.0453).
