= 557 Violetta =

Main-belt Asteroid

Discovery
- Discovered by: M. F. Wolf
- Discovery site: Heidelberg
- Discovery date: 26 January 1905

Designations
- Pronunciation: Italian: [vjoˈletta]
- Alternative designations: 1905 PY

Orbital characteristics
- Epoch 31 July 2016 (JD 2457600.5)
- Uncertainty parameter 0
- Observation arc: 111.25 yr (40634 d)
- Aphelion: 2.6867 AU (401.92 Gm)
- Perihelion: 2.1984 AU (328.88 Gm)
- Semi-major axis: 2.4425 AU (365.39 Gm)
- Eccentricity: 0.099957
- Orbital period (sidereal): 3.82 yr (1394.3 d)
- Mean anomaly: 79.8798°
- Mean motion: 0° 15^{m} 29.484^{s} / day
- Inclination: 2.4895°
- Longitude of ascending node: 292.818°
- Argument of perihelion: 195.130°

Physical characteristics
- Synodic rotation period: 5.0887 h (0.21203 d)
- Absolute magnitude (H): 12.1

557 Violetta is a minor planet orbiting the Sun that was discovered by German astronomer Max Wolf on 26 January 1905 in Heidelberg. In light of M. F. Wolf's penchant ca. 1905 for naming asteroids after operatic heroines, it is likely that 557 Violetta is named after the protagonist of Giuseppe Verdi's famous opera La Traviata.

Photometric observations of this asteroid made during 2008 at the Organ Mesa Observatory in Las Cruces, New Mexico, gave a light curve with a period of 5.0887 ± 0.0001 hours and a brightness variation of 0.25 ± 0.03 in magnitude.
