= 979 Ilsewa =

Background asteroid

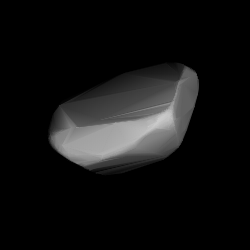
- Modelled shape of Ilsewa from its lightcurve

Discovery
- Discovered by: K. Reinmuth
- Discovery site: Heidelberg Obs.
- Discovery date: 29 June 1922

Designations
- Named after: Ilse Walldorf (acquaintance of discoverer)
- Alternative designations: A922 MA · 1932 EG_{1} 1951 TW · 1966 HO; A916 KD · A923 XB; 1922 MC · 1916 KD
- Minor planet category: main-belt · (outer) background

Orbital characteristics
- Epoch 31 May 2020 (JD 2459000.5)
- Uncertainty parameter 0
- Observation arc: 97.43 yr (35,587 d)
- Aphelion: 3.5941 AU
- Perihelion: 2.7230 AU
- Semi-major axis: 3.1585 AU
- Eccentricity: 0.1379
- Orbital period (sidereal): 5.61 yr (2,050 d)
- Mean anomaly: 123.47°
- Mean motion: 0° 10^{m} 32.16^{s} / day
- Inclination: 10.110°
- Longitude of ascending node: 230.62°
- Argument of perihelion: 115.40°

Physical characteristics
- Mean diameter: 35.741±0.602 km; 36.82±2.5 km; 38.80±0.55 km
- Synodic rotation period: 42.61±0.01 h
- Pole ecliptic latitude: (352.0°, −66.0°) (λ_{1}/β_{1})
- Geometric albedo: 0.142±0.005; 0.1567±0.024; 0.166±0.047
- Spectral type: T (S3OS2)
- Absolute magnitude (H): 9.7

979 Ilsewa (prov. designation: A922 MA or 1922 MC) is a background asteroid from the outer regions of the asteroid belt, approximately 36 kilometers (22 miles) in diameter. It was discovered by German astronomer Karl Reinmuth at the Heidelberg-Königstuhl State Observatory on 29 June 1922. The uncommon T-type asteroid has a longer-than average rotation period of 42.6 hours. It was named after Ilse Walldorf, an acquaintance of the discoverer.

== Orbit and classification ==
Ilsewa is a non-family asteroid of the main belt's background population when applying the hierarchical clustering method to its proper orbital elements. It orbits the Sun in the outer asteroid belt at a distance of 2.7–3.6 AU once every 5 years and 7 months (2,050 days; semi-major axis of 3.16 AU). Its orbit has an eccentricity of 0.14 and an inclination of 10° with respect to the ecliptic. Ilsewa was first observed as A916 KD (1916 KD) at the Crimean Simeiz Observatory on 27 May 1916. The body's observation arc begins at Heidelberg in September 1922, three months after its official discovery observation.

== Naming ==
This minor planet was named after Ilse Walldorf, an acquaintance of the discoverer. The naming was mentioned in The Names of the Minor Planets by Paul Herget in 1955 (H 94).

== Physical characteristics ==
In both the Tholen- and SMASS-like taxonomy of the Small Solar System Objects Spectroscopic Survey (S3OS2), Ilsewa is an uncommon T-type asteroid, part of the overall larger C-complex of carbonaceous asteroids.

=== Rotation period and poles ===
In August 2012, a rotational lightcurve of Ilsewa was obtained from photometric observations by Robert Stephens at the Santana Observatory (646). Additional observations were taken at the Center for Solar System Studies (U81). Lightcurve analysis gave a rotation period of 42.61±0.01 hours with a brightness variation of 0.30±0.03 magnitude (U=3). Andrea Ferrero at Bigmuskie Observatory (B88) determined a concurring period of 42.97±0.01 hours and an amplitude of 0.31±0.02 magnitude.

A modeled lightcurve using photometric data from the Lowell Photometric Database was published in 2016. It gave a sidereal period of 42.8982 hours, as well as a spin axis at (352.0°, −66.0°) in ecliptic coordinates (λ, β).

=== Diameter and albedo ===
According to the survey carried out by the Infrared Astronomical Satellite IRAS, the Japanese Akari satellite, and the NEOWISE mission of NASA's Wide-field Infrared Survey Explorer, Ilsewa measures between 35.7 and 38.8 kilometers in diameter and its surface has an albedo between 0.14 and 0.17. The Collaborative Asteroid Lightcurve Link derives an albedo of 0.1707 and calculates a diameter of 36.93 kilometers, based on an absolute magnitude of 9.7.
