= Themis family =

Asteroid family

The Themis family (adj. Themistian; FIN: 602) is a family of carbonaceous asteroids located in the outer portion of the asteroid belt, at a mean distance of 3.13 AU from the Sun. It is one of the largest families with over 4700 known members, and consists of a well-defined core of larger bodies surrounded by a region of smaller ones. The collisional Themis family is named after its parent body, the asteroid 24 Themis, discovered on 5 April 1853 by Italian astronomer Annibale de Gasparis.

== Description ==
The Themis family is one of the largest and longest-recognized dynamical families of asteroids, and is made up of C-type asteroids with a composition believed to be similar to that of carbonaceous chondrites. To date, the Themis family comprises approximately 535 known asteroids.

Asteroids in the Themis family share the following orbital elements:

- semimajor axes between 3.08 AU and 3.24 AU
- orbital eccentricities between 0.09 and 0.22
- orbital inclinations of less than 3°

== List ==
Some of the largest members of this family include:

- 24 Themis
- 62 Erato
- 90 Antiope
- 104 Klymene
- 171 Ophelia
- 222 Lucia
- 223 Rosa
- 316 Goberta
- 379 Huenna
- 383 Janina
- 468 Lina
- 492 Gismonda
- 515 Athalia
- 526 Jena
- 767 Bondia
- 846 Lipperta

== See also ==
- Hirayama family
