= 413 Edburga =

Main-belt asteroid

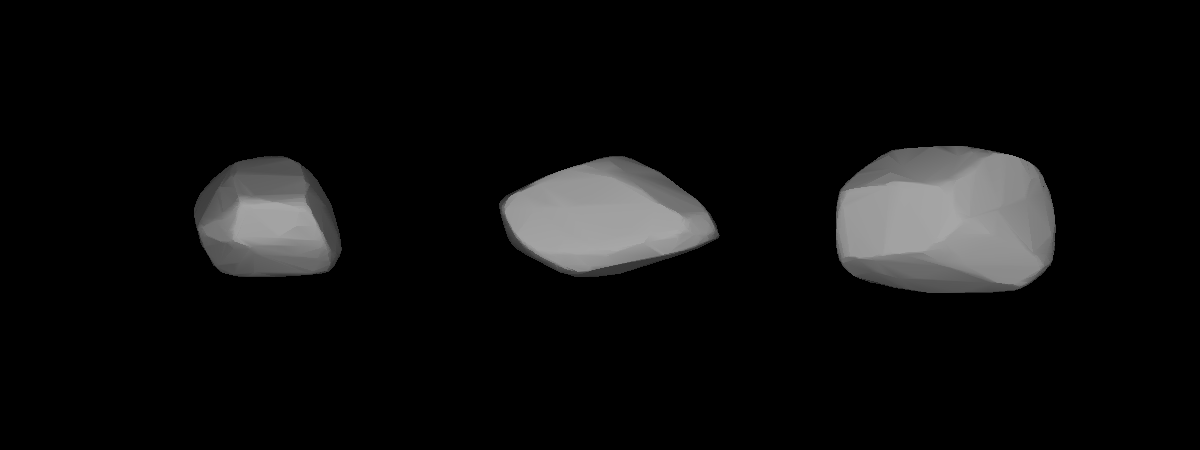
- A three-dimensional model of 413 Edburga based on its light curve

Discovery
- Discovered by: Max Wolf
- Discovery date: 7 January 1896

Designations
- Alternative designations: 1896 CL
- Minor planet category: Main belt

Orbital characteristics
- Epoch 31 July 2016 (JD 2457600.5)
- Uncertainty parameter 0
- Observation arc: 99.18 yr (36,225 d)
- Aphelion: 3.47021 AU (519.136 Gm)
- Perihelion: 1.69586 AU (253.697 Gm)
- Semi-major axis: 2.58304 AU (386.417 Gm)
- Eccentricity: 0.34346
- Orbital period (sidereal): 4.15 yr (1,516.3 d)
- Mean anomaly: 83.4524°
- Mean motion: 0° 14^{m} 14.694^{s} / day
- Inclination: 18.7206°
- Longitude of ascending node: 103.866°
- Argument of perihelion: 252.655°

Physical characteristics
- Dimensions: 46 × 29 × 25 km
- Mean diameter: 32 ± 3 km (composite estimate); 31.95±2.8 km
- Synodic rotation period: 15.773 h (0.6572 d)
- Pole ecliptic longitude: 202° (λ)
- Pole ecliptic latitude: −45° (β)
- Geometric albedo: 0.15 ± 0.02 (composite estimate); 0.1466±0.029
- Absolute magnitude (H): 10.18

413 Edburga is a typical Main belt asteroid. Max Wolf discovered it on 7 January 1896 at Heidelberg Observatory. The origin of the name is unknown. This asteroid is orbiting the Sun at a distance of 2.58 AU with a period of 4.15 yr and an eccentricity of 0.34. Its orbital plane is inclined at an angle of 18.7° to the plane of the ecliptic.

Analysis of the asteroid's light curve based on photometric data collected during 2011 shows a rotation period of 15.78±0.02 h with a brightness variation of 0.53±0.02 in magnitude. This is consistent with prior results. This is classified as an M-type asteroid in the Tholen system and X-type in the Bus and Binzel taxonomy, with a moderate albedo and generally featureless near infrared spectra. An absorption feature has been detected at a wavelength 3 μm, suggesting this is W-type. It spans a diameter of 31.95±2.8 km. Radar echoes are bimodal, suggesting a bifurcated structure that is likely a contact binary.
