= 459 Signe =

Main-belt asteroid

Discovery
- Discovered by: M. F. Wolf
- Discovery site: Heidelberg Obs.
- Discovery date: 22 October 1900

Designations
- Named after: Signy; Norse mythology
- Alternative designations: 1900 FM
- Minor planet category: main belt · (middle) background

Orbital characteristics
- Epoch 4 September 2017 (JD 2458000.5)
- Uncertainty parameter 0
- Observation arc: 116.70 yr (42,624 days)
- Aphelion: 3.1716 AU
- Perihelion: 2.0727 AU
- Semi-major axis: 2.6222 AU
- Eccentricity: 0.2095
- Orbital period (sidereal): 4.25 yr (1,551 days)
- Mean anomaly: 182.92°
- Mean motion: 0° 13^{m} 55.56^{s} / day
- Inclination: 10.302°
- Longitude of ascending node: 29.497°
- Argument of perihelion: 19.410°

Physical characteristics
- Dimensions: 29.32±2.4 km
- Synodic rotation period: 5.5362 h (0.23068 d)
- Geometric albedo: 0.1370±0.026
- Spectral type: Tholen = S
- Absolute magnitude (H): 10.44

459 Signe, provisional designation 1900 FM, is a stony asteroid from the background population of the intermediate asteroid belt, approximately 26 kilometers in diameter. It was discovered by German astronomer Max Wolf at Heidelberg-Königstuhl State Observatory on 22 October 1900. The asteroid was presumably named after Signy, a character of the Scandinavian Völsunga saga and Norse mythology. Signy is the daughter of Völsung and sister of Sigmund.
