= 586 Thekla =

Main-belt asteroid

Discovery
- Discovered by: M. F. Wolf
- Discovery site: Heidelberg
- Discovery date: 21 February 1906

Designations
- Pronunciation: /ˈθɛklə/
- Alternative designations: 1906 TC

Orbital characteristics
- Epoch 31 July 2016 (JD 2457600.5)
- Uncertainty parameter 0
- Observation arc: 109.92 yr (40150 d)
- Aphelion: 3.2243 AU (482.35 Gm)
- Perihelion: 2.8592 AU (427.73 Gm)
- Semi-major axis: 3.0418 AU (455.05 Gm)
- Eccentricity: 0.060027
- Orbital period (sidereal): 5.31 yr (1937.7 d)
- Mean anomaly: 318.333°
- Mean motion: 0° 11^{m} 8.844^{s} / day
- Inclination: 1.6260°
- Longitude of ascending node: 228.434°
- Argument of perihelion: 250.921°

Physical characteristics
- Mean radius: 41.185±0.85 km
- Synodic rotation period: 13.670 h (0.5696 d)
- Geometric albedo: 0.0539±0.002
- Absolute magnitude (H): 9.21

586 Thekla is a minor planet orbiting the Sun. It was named after Saint Thecla of the first century. The name may have been inspired by the asteroid's provisional designation 1906 TC.
