= 861 Aïda =

Main-belt asteroid

Discovery
- Discovered by: M. F. Wolf
- Discovery site: Heidelberg Obs.
- Discovery date: 22 January 1917

Designations
- Pronunciation: /ɑːˈiːdə/
- Named after: Aida (Italian opera)
- Alternative designations: 1917 BE · 1939 BL; 1947 OF · 1950 BW_{1} A906 BG · A918 GA
- Minor planet category: main-belt · (outer)

Orbital characteristics
- Epoch 16 February 2017 (JD 2457800.5)
- Uncertainty parameter 0
- Observation arc: 110.96 yr (40,527 days)
- Aphelion: 3.4604 AU
- Perihelion: 2.8158 AU
- Semi-major axis: 3.1381 AU
- Eccentricity: 0.1027
- Orbital period (sidereal): 5.56 yr (2,030 days)
- Mean anomaly: 160.30°
- Mean motion: 0° 10^{m} 38.28^{s} / day
- Inclination: 8.0502°
- Longitude of ascending node: 115.03°
- Argument of perihelion: 193.73°

Physical characteristics
- Dimensions: 62.24±17.34 km 62.52±21.29 km 66.78 km (derived); 66.85±3.7 km (IRAS:39); 69.61±1.13 km
- Synodic rotation period: 10.95±0.03 h
- Geometric albedo: 0.0522 (derived); 0.053±0.002; 0.0571±0.007 (IRAS:39); 0.06±0.04; 0.07±0.07
- Spectral type: C
- Absolute magnitude (H): 9.6 · 9.60±0.23 · 9.64 · 9.7

861 Aïda /ɑːˈiːdə/ is a carbonaceous asteroid from the outer region of the asteroid belt, approximately 65 kilometers in diameter. It was discovered on 22 January 1917, by German astronomer Max Wolf at Heidelberg Observatory in southwest Germany, and given the provisional designation 1917 BE. It was named after the Italian opera Aida.

== Orbit and classification ==
Aïda is a dark C-type asteroid that orbits the Sun in the outer main-belt at a distance of 2.8–3.5 AU once every 5 years and 7 months (2,030 days). Its orbit has an eccentricity of 0.10 and an inclination of 8° with respect to the ecliptic. Aïda was first identified as A906 BG at Heidelberg in 1906, extending the body's observation arc by 11 years prior to its official discovery observation.

== Physical characteristics ==
In May 2002, a rotational lightcurve of Aïda was obtained from photometric observations by French amateur astronomer Laurent Bernasconi. Lightcurve analysis gave a well-defined rotation period of 10.95 hours with a brightness variation of 0.32 magnitude (U=3).

According to the surveys carried out by the Infrared Astronomical Satellite IRAS, the Japanese Akari satellite, and NASA's Wide-field Infrared Survey Explorer with its subsequent NEOWISE mission, Aïda measures between 62.24 and 66.85 kilometers in diameter, and its surface has an albedo between 0.0571 and 0.7. The Collaborative Asteroid Lightcurve Link derives an albedo of 0.0522 and a diameter of 66.78 kilometers with an absolute magnitude of 9.7.

== Naming ==
This minor planet was named for Aida, the famous Italian opera in four acts by composer Giuseppe Verdi (1813–1901), after whom the asteroid 3975 Verdi was named. Naming citation was first mentioned in The Names of the Minor Planets by Paul Herget in 1955 (H 84).
