= 549 Jessonda =

Main-belt asteroid

Discovery
- Discovered by: Max Wolf
- Discovery site: Heidelberg
- Discovery date: 15 November 1904

Designations
- Pronunciation: German: [jɛsɔndaː]
- Alternative designations: 1904 PK

Orbital characteristics
- Epoch 31 July 2016 (JD 2457600.5)
- Uncertainty parameter 0
- Observation arc: 111.42 yr (40695 d)
- Aphelion: 3.3765 AU (505.12 Gm)
- Perihelion: 1.9899 AU (297.68 Gm)
- Semi-major axis: 2.6832 AU (401.40 Gm)
- Eccentricity: 0.25839
- Orbital period (sidereal): 4.40 yr (1605.3 d)
- Mean anomaly: 129.346°
- Mean motion: 0° 13^{m} 27.3^{s} / day
- Inclination: 3.9605°
- Longitude of ascending node: 291.421°
- Argument of perihelion: 158.166°

Physical characteristics
- Mean radius: 9.405±0.35 km
- Synodic rotation period: 2.962 h (0.1234 d)
- Geometric albedo: 0.1971±0.015
- Absolute magnitude (H): 11.01

549 Jessonda is a minor planet orbiting the Sun. According to the Catalogue of Minor Planet Names and Discovery Circumstances, it is "named presumably after the character in the opera of the same name by the German composer, conductor and violinist Ludwig Spohr (1784–1859), one of the leading composers in the early romantic period.' (Around 1904 Max Wolf named numerous asteroids he had discovered after female characters in opera.)
