= 875 Nymphe =

Main-belt asteroid

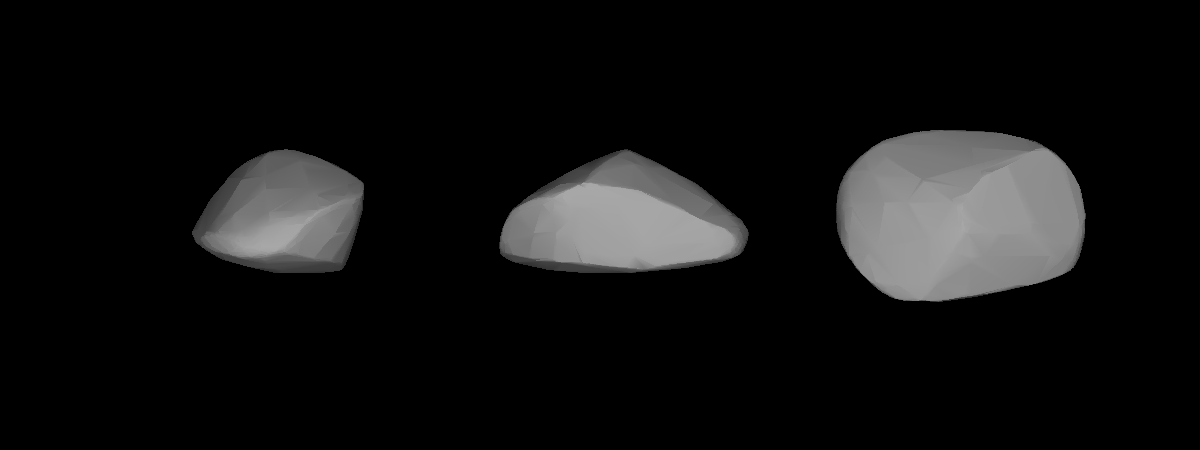
- A three-dimensional model of 875 Nymphe based on its light curve

Discovery
- Discovered by: Max Wolf
- Discovery site: Heidelberg
- Discovery date: 19 May 1917

Designations
- Pronunciation: /ˈnɪmfiː/
- Alternative designations: 1917 CF
- Adjectives: Nymphean /nɪmˈfiːən/

Orbital characteristics
- Epoch 31 July 2016 (JD 2457600.5)
- Uncertainty parameter 0
- Observation arc: 98.37 yr (35928 days)
- Aphelion: 2.9403 AU (439.86 Gm)
- Perihelion: 2.1660 AU (324.03 Gm)
- Semi-major axis: 2.5531 AU (381.94 Gm)
- Eccentricity: 0.15162
- Orbital period (sidereal): 4.08 yr (1490.1 d)
- Mean anomaly: 43.2941°
- Mean motion: 0° 14^{m} 29.76^{s} / day
- Inclination: 14.575°
- Longitude of ascending node: 196.094°
- Argument of perihelion: 117.430°
- Earth MOID: 1.19548 AU (178.841 Gm)
- Jupiter MOID: 2.47772 AU (370.662 Gm)
- T_{Jupiter}: 3.378

Physical characteristics
- Mean radius: 6.875±0.3 km
- Synodic rotation period: 9.57 ± 0.01 h, 12.618 h (0.5258 d)
- Geometric albedo: 0.2346±0.022
- Absolute magnitude (H): 11.2

875 Nymphe is a minor planet orbiting the Sun. It is a member of the Maria family of asteroids.
