= 558 Carmen =

Main-base asteroid

Discovery
- Discovered by: M. F. Wolf
- Discovery site: Heidelberg
- Discovery date: 9 February 1905

Designations
- Alternative designations: 1905 QB

Orbital characteristics
- Epoch 31 July 2016 (JD 2457600.5)
- Uncertainty parameter 0
- Observation arc: 111.15 yr (40,597 d)
- Aphelion: 3.0333 AU (453.78 Gm)
- Perihelion: 2.7817 AU (416.14 Gm)
- Semi-major axis: 2.9075 AU (434.96 Gm)
- Eccentricity: 0.043262
- Orbital period (sidereal): 4.96 yr (1,810.8 d)
- Mean anomaly: 216.857°
- Mean motion: 0° 11^{m} 55.716^{s} / day
- Inclination: 8.3757°
- Longitude of ascending node: 143.728°
- Argument of perihelion: 311.756°

Physical characteristics
- Mean radius: 29.655±0.9 km
- Synodic rotation period: 11.387 h (0.4745 d)
- Geometric albedo: 0.1161±0.007
- Absolute magnitude (H): 9.09

558 Carmen is a minor planet orbiting the Sun. As with a number of asteroids discovered by Max Wolf, it is named after a female character in opera, in this case the title character of Bizet's Carmen. This is classified as an M-type asteroid that spans a girth of approximately 59 km. The near infrared spectrum of this object is described as featureless. Some evidence for iron-poor orthopyroxenes on the surface has been reported.
