= 860 Ursina =

Main-belt asteroid

Discovery
- Discovered by: Max Wolf
- Discovery site: Heidelberg
- Discovery date: 22 January 1917

Designations
- Pronunciation: /ɜːrˈsaɪnə/
- Alternative designations: 1917 BD

Orbital characteristics
- Epoch 31 July 2016 (JD 2457600.5)
- Uncertainty parameter 0
- Observation arc: 113.24 yr (41362 days)
- Aphelion: 3.0938 AU (462.83 Gm)
- Perihelion: 2.5013 AU (374.19 Gm)
- Semi-major axis: 2.7975 AU (418.50 Gm)
- Eccentricity: 0.10590
- Orbital period (sidereal): 4.68 yr (1709.1 d)
- Mean anomaly: 247.967°
- Mean motion: 0° 12^{m} 38.304^{s} / day
- Inclination: 13.297°
- Longitude of ascending node: 309.388°
- Argument of perihelion: 21.338°
- Earth MOID: 1.49307 AU (223.360 Gm)
- Jupiter MOID: 2.21886 AU (331.937 Gm)
- T_{Jupiter}: 3.279

Physical characteristics
- Mean radius: 14.66±0.8 km
- Synodic rotation period: 9.386 h (0.3911 d)
- Geometric albedo: 0.1618±0.020
- Absolute magnitude (H): 10.26

860 Ursina is a minor planet orbiting the Sun that was discovered in 1917 by German astronomer Max Wolf. The origin of the name is unknown.

Photometric observations of this asteroid collected during 1999 show a rotation period of 9.386 ± 0.002 hours with a brightness variation of 0.22 magnitude.
