= 491 Carina =

Asteroid

Discovery
- Discovered by: Max Wolf
- Discovery site: Heidelberg
- Discovery date: 3 September 1902

Designations
- Alternative designations: 1902 JQ
- Symbol: (Astronomical)

Orbital characteristics
- Epoch 31 July 2016 (JD 2457600.5)
- Uncertainty parameter 0
- Observation arc: 113.62 yr (41501 d)
- Aphelion: 3.4709 AU (519.24 Gm)
- Perihelion: 2.9118 AU (435.60 Gm)
- Semi-major axis: 3.1914 AU (477.43 Gm)
- Eccentricity: 0.087591
- Orbital period (sidereal): 5.70 yr (2082.4 d)
- Mean anomaly: 295.527°
- Mean motion: 0° 10^{m} 22.368^{s} / day
- Inclination: 18.863°
- Longitude of ascending node: 175.423°
- Argument of perihelion: 233.431°

Physical characteristics
- Mean diameter: 91.176±0.469 km
- Mass: (1.353 ± 0.769/0.297)×10^{18} kg
- Mean density: 3.408 ± 1.937/0.749 g/cm^{3}
- Synodic rotation period: 15.153 h (0.6314 d)
- Geometric albedo: 0.0743±0.006
- Absolute magnitude (H): 9.0

491 Carina is a minor planet orbiting the Sun. On 8 February 2018, it occulted a star in the constellation Eridanus.
