= 565 Marbachia =

Main-belt asteroid

Discovery
- Discovered by: M. F. Wolf
- Discovery site: Heidelberg
- Discovery date: 9 May 1905

Designations
- Pronunciation: /mɑːrˈbɑːkiə/
- Alternative designations: 1905 QN

Orbital characteristics
- Epoch 31 July 2016 (JD 2457600.5)
- Uncertainty parameter 0
- Observation arc: 110.91 yr (40510 d)
- Aphelion: 2.7604 AU (412.95 Gm)
- Perihelion: 2.1255 AU (317.97 Gm)
- Semi-major axis: 2.4429 AU (365.45 Gm)
- Eccentricity: 0.12995
- Orbital period (sidereal): 3.82 yr (1394.7 d)
- Mean anomaly: 112.972°
- Mean motion: 0° 15^{m} 29.268^{s} / day
- Inclination: 10.996°
- Longitude of ascending node: 225.820°
- Argument of perihelion: 291.598°

Physical characteristics
- Mean radius: 13.785±0.45 km
- Synodic rotation period: 4.587 h (0.1911 d)
- Geometric albedo: 0.1033±0.007
- Absolute magnitude (H): 10.88

565 Marbachia is a minor planet orbiting the Sun. It was named after the German city of Marbach on the river Neckar, birthplace of the writer Friedrich Schiller. This is classified as a D-type asteroid, although it displays a type of polarimetric behavior that is a characteristic of the "barbarians" class. Light curve analysis based on photometric data show a rotation period of 4.587±0.001 h with a brightness variation of 0.30 in magnitude.
