= 949 Hel =

Main-belt asteroid

Discovery
- Discovered by: M. F. Wolf
- Discovery site: Heidelberg Obs.
- Discovery date: 11 March 1921

Designations
- Pronunciation: /ˈhɛl/
- Named after: Hel (Norse mythology)
- Alternative designations: A921 EM · 1952 DN; 1954 SN_{1} · 1921 JK
- Minor planet category: main-belt · (outer) background

Orbital characteristics
- Epoch 31 May 2020 (JD 2459000.5)
- Uncertainty parameter 0
- Observation arc: 91.34 yr (33,361 d)
- Aphelion: 3.5804 AU
- Perihelion: 2.4255 AU
- Semi-major axis: 3.0029 AU
- Eccentricity: 0.1923
- Orbital period (sidereal): 5.20 yr (1,901 d)
- Mean anomaly: 358.26°
- Mean motion: 0° 11^{m} 21.84^{s} / day
- Inclination: 10.701°
- Longitude of ascending node: 321.17°
- Argument of perihelion: 249.54°

Physical characteristics
- Mean diameter: 60.98±0.74 km; 63.494±0.743 km; 63.56±4.01 km; 69.17±1.4 km
- Mass: (1.73±0.62)×10^{18} kg
- Mean density: 12.86±5.19 g/cm^{3}
- Synodic rotation period: 8.215±0.001 h
- Geometric albedo: 0.0487±0.002; 0.058±0.013; 0.063±0.002
- Spectral type: X (S3OS2-TH); Xk (S3OS2-BB)
- Absolute magnitude (H): 9.8

949 Hel (prov. designation: A921 EM or 1921 JK) is a dark background asteroid from the outer regions of the asteroid belt, approximately 63 kilometers (39 miles) in diameter. It was discovered by German astronomer Max Wolf at the Heidelberg Observatory on 11 March 1921. The transitional X-type asteroid has a rotation period of 8.2 hours. It was named in memory of the discoverer, after the Norse goddess of the dead, Hel.

== Orbit and classification ==
Hel is a non-family asteroid of the main belt's background population when applying the hierarchical clustering method to its proper orbital elements. It orbits the Sun in the outer asteroid belt at a distance of 2.4–3.6 AU once every 5 years and 2 months (1,901 days; semi-major axis of 3 AU). Its orbit has an eccentricity of 0.19 and an inclination of 11° with respect to the ecliptic. The body's observation arc begins at Lowell Observatory on 11 January 1931, almost a decade after its official discovery observation at Heidelberg in March 1921.

== Naming ==
This minor planet was named from Norse mythology, after Hel, the goddess of the dead and the queen of the underworld. The asteroid's name was proposed by the widow of Max Wolf, who had died two years earlier (RI 1013).

== Physical characteristics ==
In the Tholen-like taxonomy of the Small Solar System Objects Spectroscopic Survey (S3OS2), Hel is an X-type asteroid, while in the SMASS-like taxonomy of the S3OS2, it is a Xk-subtype that transitions from the X-type to the uncommon K-type asteroids.

=== Rotation period ===
In September 2016, a rotational lightcurve of Hel was obtained from photometric observations by Pedro Brines and colleges of the Spanish group of asteroid observers (OBAS). Lightcurve analysis gave a rotation period of 8.215±0.001 hours with a brightness variation of 0.13±0.01 magnitude (U=2+). The result supersedes previous observations by French amateur astronomers Laurent Bernasconi and René Roy in December 2001 and February 2004, which gave two tentative periods of 10.862±0.007 and 10.85±0.05 hours with an amplitude of 0.12 and 0.14, respectively.

=== Diameter, mass and albedo ===
According to the surveys carried out by the Japanese Akari satellite, the NEOWISE mission of NASA's Wide-field Infrared Survey Explorer (WISE), and the Infrared Astronomical Satellite IRAS, Hel measures 60.98±0.74, 63.494±0.743 and 69.17±1.4 kilometers in diameter, and its surface has a corresponding albedo of 0.063±0.002, 0.058±0.013 and 0.0487±0.002, respectively. The Collaborative Asteroid Lightcurve Link derives an albedo of 0.0445 and a diameter of 69.11 km based on an absolute magnitude of 9.8.

Benoit Carry estimates a diameter of 63.56±4.01 kilometers, along with a mass of (1.73±0.62)×10^{18} kg and a density of 12.86±5.19 g/cm^{3}. Apart from the above mentioned 63.494±0.743 kilometers, the WISE team has also published three more mean-diameters of 52.16±14.00 km and 61.90±18.34 km and 66.742±1.227 km with albedos of 0.06±0.03, 0.05±0.03 and 0.0523±0.0057, respectively.

An asteroid occultation on 27 October 2005, gave a best-fit ellipse dimension of 69.0 × 69.0 kilometers, while a second occultation event gave an ellipse of 61.0 km × 61.0 km on 3 February 2014, with the latter having a better quality rating. These timed observations are taken when the asteroid passes in front of a distant star.
