= 550 Senta =

Main-belt asteroid

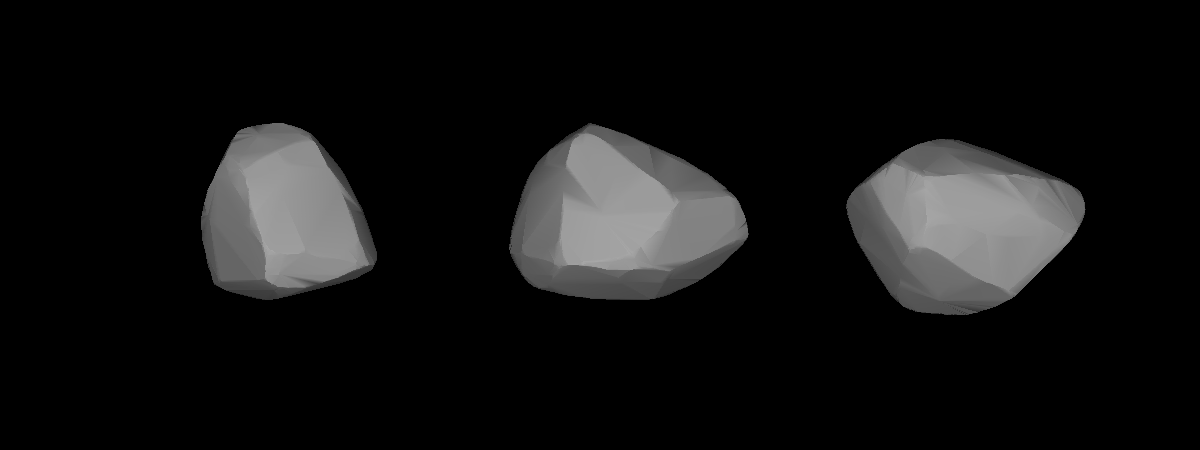
- A three-dimensional model of 550 Senta based on its light curve

Discovery
- Discovered by: Max Wolf
- Discovery site: Heidelberg
- Discovery date: 16 November 1904

Designations
- Pronunciation: German: [ˈzɛntaː]
- Alternative designations: 1904 PL

Orbital characteristics
- Epoch 31 July 2016 (JD 2457600.5)
- Uncertainty parameter 0
- Observation arc: 115.33 yr (42124 d)
- Aphelion: 3.1653 AU (473.52 Gm)
- Perihelion: 2.0115 AU (300.92 Gm)
- Semi-major axis: 2.5884 AU (387.22 Gm)
- Eccentricity: 0.22287
- Orbital period (sidereal): 4.16 yr (1521.1 d)
- Mean anomaly: 17.4133°
- Mean motion: 0° 14^{m} 12.012^{s} / day
- Inclination: 10.108°
- Longitude of ascending node: 270.702°
- Argument of perihelion: 45.342°

Physical characteristics
- Mean radius: 18.875±1.9 km
- Synodic rotation period: 20.555 h (0.8565 d)
- Geometric albedo: 0.2215±0.052
- Absolute magnitude (H): 9.37

550 Senta is a minor planet orbiting the Sun that was discovered by German astronomer Max Wolf on 16 November 1904, from Heidelberg.

Photometric observations of this asteroid made at the Torino Observatory in Italy during 1990–1991 were used to determine a synodic rotation period of 20.555 ± 0.01 hours.

In light of Max Wolf's propensity around the time of discovery to name asteroids after operatic heroines, it is likely that the asteroid is named after Senta, the heroine of Richard Wagner's opera The Flying Dutchman.
