= 316 (disambiguation) =

316 may refer to:

- The year 316
- The year 316 BC
- 316 (number), the number

316 may also refer to:

== In the bible ==
- John 3:16, a famous verse in the Christian bible

== In media and entertainment ==
- "316" (Lost), a television episode
- Austin 3:16, catchphrase of wrestler Steve Austin based on the biblical verse
- "316", an instrumental song by Eddie Van Halen from the album For Unlawful Carnal Knowledge

== In telephony ==
- Area code 316, encompassing the city of Wichita, Kansas and surrounding communities
- 316, the prefix for a Sprint Nextel cell phone in the US 716 area code

== In other uses ==
- Grade 316 (stainless steel) or Marine grade stainless, the second most common austenite stainless steel
- BMW 316, one of several cars made by BMW in the 3 Series
- 316 Goberta, an asteroid
