= 311 Claudia =

Main-belt asteroid

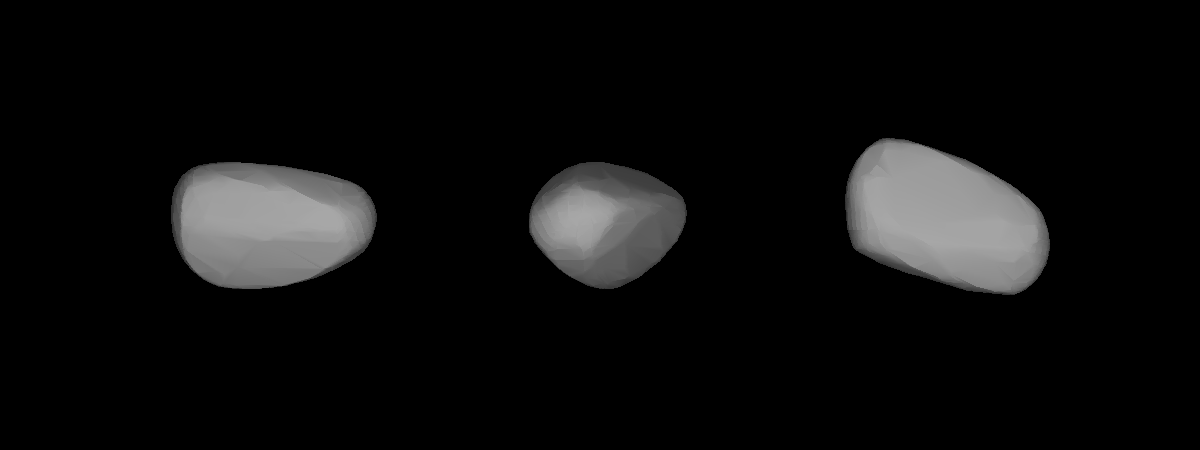
- A three-dimensional model of 311 Claudia based on its lightcurve

Discovery
- Discovered by: Auguste Charlois
- Discovery date: 11 June 1891

Designations
- Pronunciation: /ˈklaʊdiə/ KLOW-dee-ə
- Minor planet category: Main belt (Koronis)

Orbital characteristics
- Epoch 31 July 2016 (JD 2457600.5)
- Uncertainty parameter 0
- Observation arc: 113.31 yr (41387 d)
- Aphelion: 2.90489 AU (434.565 Gm)
- Perihelion: 2.89097 AU (432.483 Gm)
- Semi-major axis: 2.89793 AU (433.524 Gm)
- Eccentricity: 0.0024026
- Orbital period (sidereal): 4.93 yr (1801.9 d)
- Mean anomaly: 260.154°
- Mean motion: 0° 11^{m} 59.24^{s} / day
- Inclination: 3.22695°
- Longitude of ascending node: 81.0114°
- Argument of perihelion: 51.4007°

Physical characteristics
- Dimensions: 24.05±1.8 km
- Synodic rotation period: 7.532 h (0.3138 d)
- Geometric albedo: 0.3381±0.057
- Absolute magnitude (H): 10.0

311 Claudia is a typical Main belt asteroid.

It was discovered by Auguste Charlois on 11 June 1891 in Nice. The name was suggested to Charlois by the amateur astronomer Arthur Mee of Cardiff, Wales, to commemorate Mee's wife, Claudia.

311 Claudia is one of the Koronis family of asteroids. A group of astronomers, including Lucy D'Escoffier Crespo da Silva and Richard P. Binzel, used observations made between 1998 through 2000 to determine the spin-vector alignment of these asteroids. The collaborative work resulted in the creation of 61 new individual rotation lightcurves to augment previously published observations.
