= 367 Amicitia =

Main-belt asteroid

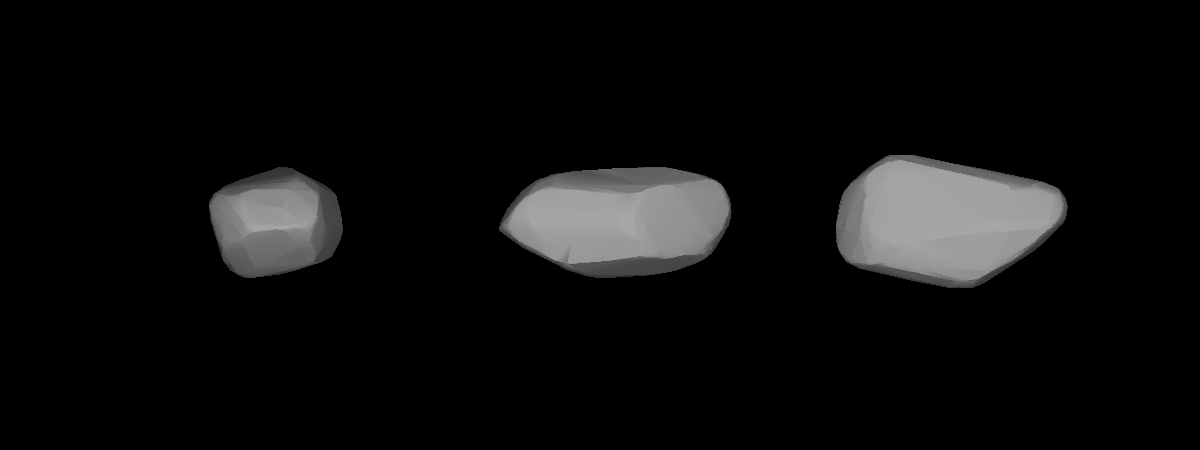
- A three-dimensional model of 367 Amicitia based on its light curve

Discovery
- Discovered by: Auguste Charlois
- Discovery date: 19 May 1893

Designations
- Pronunciation: /æmɪˈsɪtiə/
- Named after: friendship
- Alternative designations: 1893 AA
- Minor planet category: Main belt

Orbital characteristics
- Epoch 31 July 2016 (JD 2457600.5)
- Uncertainty parameter 0
- Observation arc: 110.06 yr (40199 d)
- Aphelion: 2.43145 AU (363.740 Gm)
- Perihelion: 2.00750 AU (300.318 Gm)
- Semi-major axis: 2.21948 AU (332.029 Gm)
- Eccentricity: 0.095505
- Orbital period (sidereal): 3.31 yr (1207.7 d)
- Mean anomaly: 183.800°
- Mean motion: 0° 17^{m} 53.077^{s} / day
- Inclination: 2.94143°
- Longitude of ascending node: 83.4555°
- Argument of perihelion: 55.5396°

Physical characteristics
- Dimensions: 19.13±1.6 km
- Synodic rotation period: 5.055 ± 0.001 h (0.210625 ± 4.2×10^{−5} d)
- Geometric albedo: 0.2535±0.050
- Absolute magnitude (H): 10.6

367 Amicitia is a typical Main belt asteroid that is a member of the Flora family. It was discovered by Auguste Charlois on 19 May 1893 in Nice.

Amicitia is Latin for Friendship.
