= 347 Pariana =

Main-belt asteroid

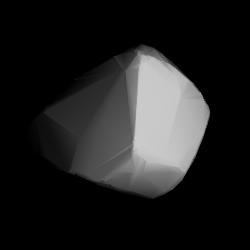
- Modelled shape of Pariana from its lightcurve

Discovery
- Discovered by: Auguste Charlois
- Discovery date: 28 November 1892

Designations
- Pronunciation: classically: /pæriˈeɪnə/
- Named after: unknown
- Alternative designations: 1892 Q · A892 WD
- Minor planet category: Main belt

Orbital characteristics
- Epoch 31 July 2016 (JD 2457600.5)
- Uncertainty parameter 0
- Observation arc: 123.38 yr (45065 d)
- Aphelion: 3.04828 AU (456.016 Gm)
- Perihelion: 2.17513 AU (325.395 Gm)
- Semi-major axis: 2.61171 AU (390.706 Gm)
- Eccentricity: 0.16716
- Orbital period (sidereal): 4.22 yr (1541.6 d)
- Mean anomaly: 8.01559°
- Mean motion: 0° 14^{m} 0.661^{s} / day
- Inclination: 11.6792°
- Longitude of ascending node: 85.5359°
- Argument of perihelion: 86.2897°

Physical characteristics
- Mean diameter: 48.615±0.118 km
- Synodic rotation period: 4.0529 h (0.16887 d)
- Geometric albedo: 0.1845±0.036
- Spectral type: M
- Absolute magnitude (H): 8.96

347 Pariana (prov. designation: A892 WD or 1892 Q) is a metallic background asteroid from the central region of the asteroid belt. It was discovered by French astronomer Auguste Charlois at the Nice Observatory on 28 November 1892. The M-type asteroid has a short rotation period of 4.1 hours and measures approximately 49 kilometers (30 miles) in diameter. The origin of the asteroid's name remains unknown.
