= 425 Cornelia =

Main-belt asteroid

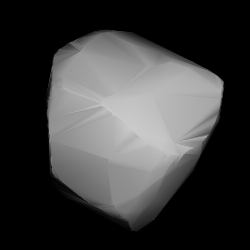
- Modelled shape of Cornelia from its lightcurve

Discovery
- Discovered by: Auguste Charlois
- Discovery date: 28 December 1896

Designations
- Pronunciation: /kɔːrˈniːliə/
- Alternative designations: 1896 DC
- Minor planet category: Main belt

Orbital characteristics
- Epoch 31 July 2016 (JD 2457600.5)
- Uncertainty parameter 0
- Observation arc: 115.49 yr (42183 d)
- Aphelion: 3.05934 AU (457.671 Gm)
- Perihelion: 2.71122 AU (405.593 Gm)
- Semi-major axis: 2.88528 AU (431.632 Gm)
- Eccentricity: 0.060327
- Orbital period (sidereal): 4.90 yr (1790.1 d)
- Mean anomaly: 65.7558°
- Mean motion: 0° 12^{m} 3.978^{s} / day
- Inclination: 4.04794°
- Longitude of ascending node: 61.0718°
- Argument of perihelion: 121.156°

Physical characteristics
- Dimensions: 63.85±1.7 km
- Synodic rotation period: 17.505 h (0.7294 d)
- Geometric albedo: 0.0475±0.003
- Absolute magnitude (H): 9.7

425 Cornelia is a large Main belt asteroid. It was discovered by Auguste Charlois on 28 December 1896 in Nice. It is named after Cornelia Africana.
