= 370 Modestia =

Main-belt asteroid

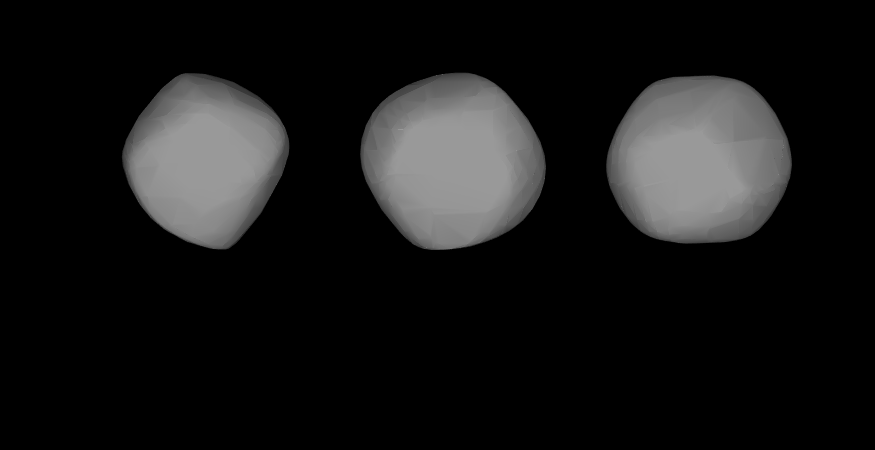
- Lightcurve-base 3D-model of 370 Modestia.

Discovery
- Discovered by: Auguste Charlois
- Discovery date: 14 July 1893

Designations
- Pronunciation: /məˈdɛstiə/
- Named after: modesty
- Alternative designations: 1893 AC
- Minor planet category: Main belt

Orbital characteristics
- Epoch 31 July 2016 (JD 2457600.5)
- Uncertainty parameter 0
- Observation arc: 111.53 yr (40736 d)
- Aphelion: 2.53480 AU (379.201 Gm)
- Perihelion: 2.11408 AU (316.262 Gm)
- Semi-major axis: 2.32444 AU (347.731 Gm)
- Eccentricity: 0.090853
- Orbital period (sidereal): 3.54 yr (1294.8 d)
- Average orbital speed: 19.54 km/s
- Mean anomaly: 209.268°
- Mean motion: 0° 16^{m} 40.958^{s} / day
- Inclination: 7.86393°
- Longitude of ascending node: 290.942°
- Argument of perihelion: 68.7121°

Physical characteristics
- Dimensions: 38.093 km diameter
- Synodic rotation period: 22.5299 h (0.93875 d)
- Absolute magnitude (H): 10.68

370 Modestia is probably a typical Main belt asteroid. It was discovered by Auguste Charlois on 14 July 1893 in Nice.
