= 388 Charybdis =

Main-belt asteroid

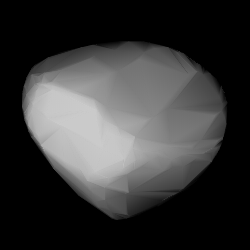
- Modelled shape of Charybdis

Discovery
- Discovered by: Auguste Charlois
- Discovery date: 7 March 1894

Designations
- Pronunciation: /kəˈrɪbdɪs/
- Named after: Charybdis
- Alternative designations: 1894 BA
- Minor planet category: Main belt
- Adjectives: Charybdian /kəˈrɪbdiən/
- Symbol: Astrological symbol for Charybdis; it is the mirror of that used for 155 Scylla

Orbital characteristics
- Epoch 31 July 2016 (JD 2457600.5)
- Uncertainty parameter 0
- Observation arc: 122.09 yr (44595 d)
- Aphelion: 3.20025 AU (478.751 Gm)
- Perihelion: 2.81022 AU (420.403 Gm)
- Semi-major axis: 3.00524 AU (449.578 Gm)
- Eccentricity: 0.064892
- Orbital period (sidereal): 5.21 yr (1902.9 d)
- Mean anomaly: 10.9926°
- Mean motion: 0° 11^{m} 21.066^{s} / day
- Inclination: 6.44575°
- Longitude of ascending node: 354.285°
- Argument of perihelion: 333.004°

Physical characteristics
- Mean diameter: 125.754±1.887 km
- Mass: (1.47±0.40)×10^{18} kg (Note: Calculated from its standard gravitational parameter GM = 0.098±0.027 km^{3}/s^{2}.)
- Mean density: 1.41 g/cm^{3}
- Synodic rotation period: 9.516 h (0.3965 d)
- Geometric albedo: 0.0506±0.007
- Spectral type: C
- Absolute magnitude (H): 8.57

388 Charybdis (/kəˈrɪbdɪs/, prov. designation: A894 ED or 1894 BA) is a very large background asteroid, approximately 125 kilometers (78 miles) in diameter, that is located in the outer region of the asteroid belt. It was discovered by French astronomer Auguste Charlois at the Nice Observatory on 7 March 1894. The carbonaceous C-type asteroid has a rotation period of 9.5 hours. It is probably named after Charybdis, a sea monster in Greek mythology.
