= 350 Ornamenta =

Main-belt asteroid

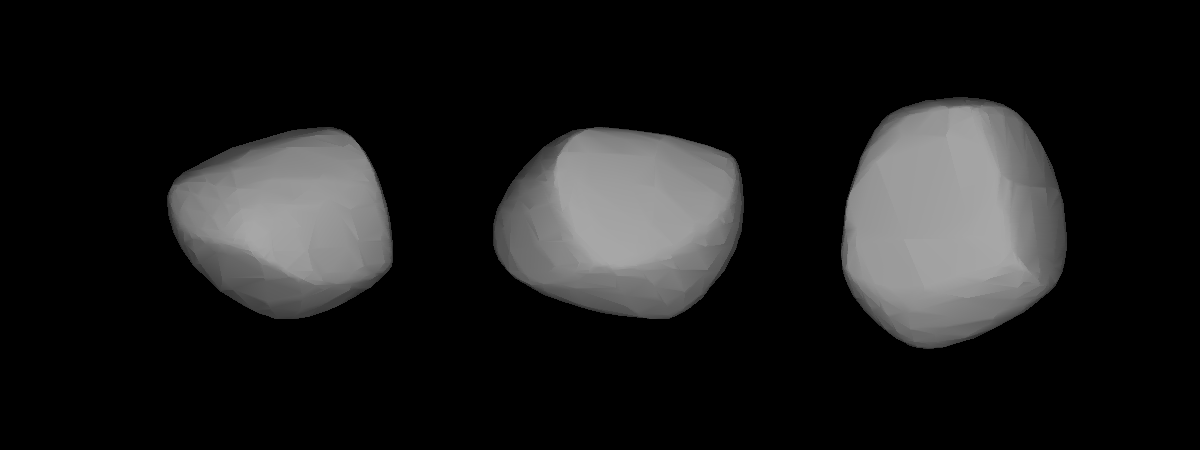
- A three-dimensional model of 350 Ornamenta based on its lightcurve

Discovery
- Discovered by: Auguste Charlois
- Discovery date: 14 December 1892

Designations
- Pronunciation: /ˌɔːrnəˈmɛntə/
- Alternative designations: 1892 U
- Minor planet category: Main belt

Orbital characteristics
- Epoch 31 July 2016 (JD 2457600.5)
- Uncertainty parameter 0
- Observation arc: 123.34 yr (45051 d)
- Aphelion: 3.6041 AU (539.17 Gm)
- Perihelion: 2.61365 AU (390.996 Gm)
- Semi-major axis: 3.10885 AU (465.077 Gm)
- Eccentricity: 0.15929
- Orbital period (sidereal): 5.48 yr (2002.2 d)
- Mean anomaly: 177.109°
- Mean motion: 0° 10^{m} 47.316^{s} / day
- Inclination: 24.894°
- Longitude of ascending node: 90.106°
- Argument of perihelion: 338.34°

Physical characteristics
- Mean diameter: 111.97±8.43 km (composite estimate)
- Mass: (9.0±9.0)×10^{17} kg (Note: Calculated from its standard gravitational parameter GM = 0.06±0.06 km^{3}/s^{2}.) (SB441)
- Mean density: 1.2±1.3 g/cm^{3} (calculated)
- Synodic rotation period: 9.178 h (0.3824 d)
- Geometric albedo: 0.0566±0.005
- Spectral type: C
- Absolute magnitude (H): 8.37

350 Ornamenta is a relatively large main-belt asteroid, measuring 118 km in diameter. It is classified as a C-type asteroid and is probably composed of carbonaceous material.

Ornamenta was discovered by Auguste Charlois on 14 December 1892, in Nice, France. It was named in 1905 in honor of Antoinette Horneman, who was a member of the Société astronomique de France.

During 2002, the asteroid was observed occulting a star. The resulting chords provided a diameter estimate of 99.5 km.

This object is the namesake of a family of 14–93 asteroids that share similar spectral properties and orbital elements; hence they may have arisen from the same collisional event. All members have a relatively high orbital inclination.
