= 294 Felicia =

Main-belt asteroid

Discovery
- Discovered by: Auguste Charlois
- Discovery date: 15 July 1890

Designations
- Alternative designations: A890 NA, 1913 VA; 1926 AG, 1929 NE; 1951 PA, 1973 KD
- Minor planet category: Main belt

Orbital characteristics
- Epoch 31 July 2016 (JD 2457600.5)
- Uncertainty parameter 0
- Observation arc: 109.86 yr (40125 d)
- Aphelion: 3.90240 AU (583.791 Gm)
- Perihelion: 2.41114 AU (360.701 Gm)
- Semi-major axis: 3.15677 AU (472.246 Gm)
- Eccentricity: 0.23620
- Orbital period (sidereal): 5.61 yr (2048.6 d)
- Mean anomaly: 214.894°
- Mean motion: 0° 10^{m} 32.621^{s} / day
- Inclination: 6.28170°
- Longitude of ascending node: 135.998°
- Argument of perihelion: 185.309°

Physical characteristics
- Dimensions: 52.97±2.2 km
- Synodic rotation period: 10.4227 h (0.43428 d)
- Geometric albedo: 0.0910±0.008
- Absolute magnitude (H): 10.2

294 Felicia is a sizeable Main belt asteroid. It is approximately 53 km in diameter and has an orbital period of 5.5 years. It was discovered by Auguste Charlois on 15 July 1890 in Nice.

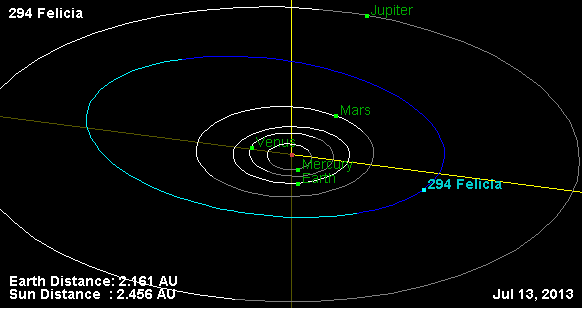
Orbital diagram of 294 Felicia
