= 416 Vaticana =

Main-belt asteroid

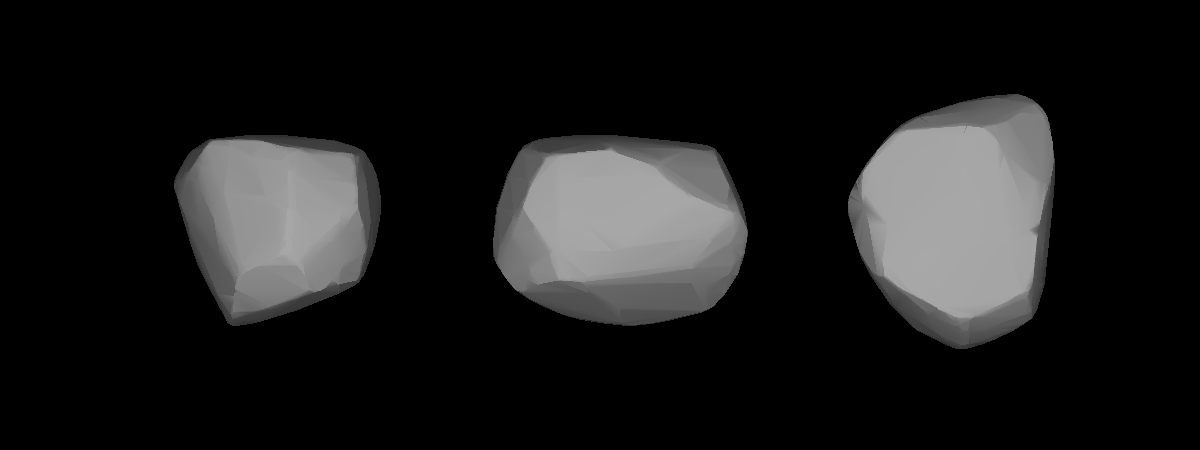
- A three-dimensional model of 416 Vaticana based on its light curve

Discovery
- Discovered by: Auguste Charlois
- Discovery date: 4 May 1896

Designations
- Pronunciation: /vætɪˈkeɪnə/
- Named after: Vatican Hill
- Alternative designations: 1896 CS
- Minor planet category: Main belt

Orbital characteristics
- Epoch 31 July 2016 (JD 2457600.5)
- Uncertainty parameter 0
- Observation arc: 117.37 yr (42868 d)
- Aphelion: 3.40808 AU (509.842 Gm)
- Perihelion: 2.18756 AU (327.254 Gm)
- Semi-major axis: 2.79782 AU (418.548 Gm)
- Eccentricity: 0.21891
- Orbital period (sidereal): 4.66 yr (1703.1 d)
- Mean anomaly: 267.98°
- Mean motion: 0° 12^{m} 40.968^{s} / day
- Inclination: 12.859°
- Longitude of ascending node: 58.117°
- Argument of perihelion: 198.162°

Physical characteristics
- Dimensions: 85.47±1.7 km 88.81 ± 1.27 km
- Mass: (1.125 ± 0.551/0.213)×10^{18} kg (7.5±3.1)×10^{17} kg (Note: Calculated from its standard gravitational parameter GM = 0.050±0.021 km^{3}/s^{2}.)
- Mean density: 3.068 ± 1.503/0.581 g/cm^{3} 2.31 g/cm^{3} (Note: Assuming a diameter of 85.5 km.)
- Synodic rotation period: 5.372 h (0.2238 d)
- Geometric albedo: 0.1689±0.007
- Absolute magnitude (H): 7.80

416 Vaticana is a large main belt asteroid, which was discovered by Auguste Charlois on 4 May 1896 in Nice.
