= 312 Pierretta =

Main-belt asteroid

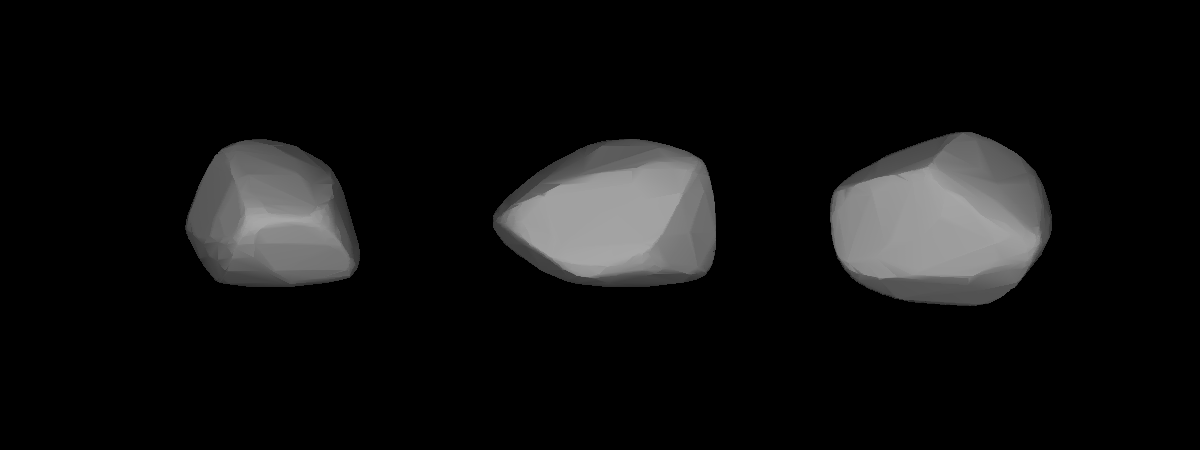
- A three-dimensional model of 312 Pierretta based on its lightcurve

Discovery
- Discovered by: Auguste Charlois
- Discovery site: Nice Observatory
- Discovery date: 28 August 1891

Designations
- Pronunciation: /piəˈrɛtə/
- Alternative designations: A891 QA
- Minor planet category: Main belt

Orbital characteristics
- Epoch 31 May 2020 (JD 2459000.5)
- Uncertainty parameter 0
- Observation arc: 128.66 yr (46994 d)
- Aphelion: 3.227 AU (482.8 Gm)
- Perihelion: 2.338 AU (349.8 Gm)
- Semi-major axis: 2.782 AU (416.2 Gm)
- Eccentricity: 0.15982
- Orbital period (sidereal): 4.64 yr (1695.1 d)
- Mean anomaly: 339.6932°
- Mean motion: 0° 12^{m} 44.554^{s} / day
- Inclination: 9.029344°
- Longitude of ascending node: 6.25477°
- Argument of perihelion: 262.764°

Physical characteristics
- Dimensions: 49.96±1.5 km
- Synodic rotation period: 10.282 h (0.4284 d)
- Geometric albedo: 0.1967±0.013
- Spectral type: S/Sk
- Absolute magnitude (H): 8.89

312 Pierretta (A891 QA) is a 46 km main-belt asteroid discovered on 28 Aug 1891 by Auguste Charlois at Nice.

== Sources ==
- "JPL Small-Body Database Browser: 312 Pierretta". Jet Propulsion Laboratory.
