= 451 Patientia =

Main-belt asteroid

Discovery
- Discovered by: Auguste Charlois
- Discovery date: 4 December 1899

Designations
- Pronunciation: /pætiˈɛnʃə/
- Named after: patience
- Alternative designations: 1899 EY
- Minor planet category: Asteroid belt
- Adjectives: Patientian

Orbital characteristics
- Epoch 31 July 2016 (JD 2457600.5)
- Uncertainty parameter 0
- Observation arc: 116.36 yr (42499 d)
- Aphelion: 3.2929 AU (492.61 Gm) (Q)
- Perihelion: 2.8304 AU (423.42 Gm) (q)
- Semi-major axis: 3.0616 AU (458.01 Gm) (a)
- Eccentricity: 0.075545 (e)
- Orbital period (sidereal): 5.36 yr (1956.7 d)
- Mean anomaly: 279.30° (M)
- Mean motion: 0° 11^{m} 2.328^{s} / day (n)
- Inclination: 15.236° (i)
- Longitude of ascending node: 89.252° (Ω)
- Argument of perihelion: 337.06° (ω)

Physical characteristics
- Dimensions: 253.9±2.8 km 234.4±10.2 km (composite estimate)
- Mass: (1.197±0.039)×10^{19} kg (Note: Calculated from its standard gravitational parameter GM = 0.799±0.026 km^{3}/s^{2}.)
- Mean density: 1.40 g/cm^{3} (Note: Assuming a diameter of 254 km.)
- Synodic rotation period: 9.727 h (0.4053 d)
- Geometric albedo: 0.0764±0.003
- Absolute magnitude (H): 6.65

451 Patientia is approximately the 15th-largest asteroid in the asteroid belt with a diameter of 250 km. It was discovered by French astronomer Auguste Charlois on 4 December 1899, and assigned a provisional designation 1899 EY.

It regularly reaches 11th magnitude in brightness, as on 11 January 2013, and 12 December 2017, when in favorable oppositions will be at magnitudes 10.7 and 10.4 respectively, very bright for a later-discovered minor planet.

Multiple photometric studies of this asteroid were performed between 1969 and 2003. The combined data gave an irregular light curve with a synodic period of 9.730 ± 0.004 hours and a brightness variation of 0.05–0.10 in magnitude.
