= 429 Lotis =

Main-belt asteroid

Discovery
- Discovered by: Auguste Charlois
- Discovery date: 23 November 1897

Designations
- Pronunciation: /ˈloʊtɪs/
- Alternative designations: 1897 DL
- Minor planet category: Main belt
- Adjectives: Lotidian /loʊˈtɪdiən/

Orbital characteristics
- Epoch 31 July 2016 (JD 2457600.5)
- Uncertainty parameter 0
- Observation arc: 114.49 yr (41818 d)
- Aphelion: 2.9274 AU (437.93 Gm)
- Perihelion: 2.2872 AU (342.16 Gm)
- Semi-major axis: 2.6073 AU (390.05 Gm)
- Eccentricity: 0.12278
- Orbital period (sidereal): 4.21 yr (1537.7 d)
- Average orbital speed: 18.44 km/s
- Mean anomaly: 89.1827°
- Mean motion: 0° 14^{m} 2.796^{s} / day
- Inclination: 9.5335°
- Longitude of ascending node: 219.980°

Physical characteristics
- Dimensions: 62±1 km
- Synodic rotation period: 13.577 h (0.5657 d)
- Geometric albedo: 0.0430±0.002
- Spectral type: C?
- Absolute magnitude (H): 9.82

429 Lotis is a large Main belt asteroid. It is classified as a probable C-type asteroid and is likely composed of primitive carbonaceous materials. This object was discovered by Auguste Charlois on 23 November 1897 in Nice.

In 2002, the asteroid was detected by radar from the Arecibo Observatory at a distance of 1.31 AU. The resulting data yielded an effective diameter of 70 ± 10 km.
