= 357 Ninina =

Main-belt asteroid

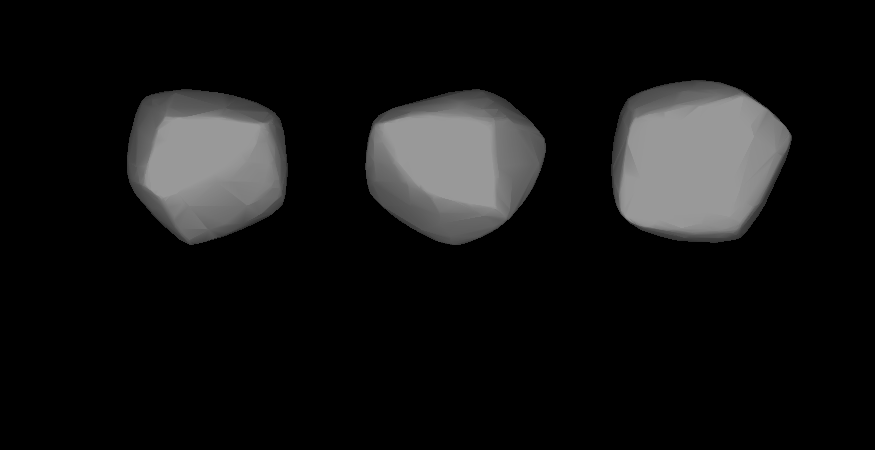
- Lightcurve-base 3D-model of 357 Ninina.

Discovery
- Discovered by: Auguste Charlois
- Discovery date: 11 February 1893

Designations
- Alternative designations: 1893 J
- Minor planet category: Main belt

Orbital characteristics
- Epoch 31 July 2016 (JD 2457600.5)
- Uncertainty parameter 0
- Observation arc: 108.56 yr (39650 d)
- Aphelion: 3.38973 AU (507.096 Gm)
- Perihelion: 2.92272 AU (437.233 Gm)
- Semi-major axis: 3.15623 AU (472.165 Gm)
- Eccentricity: 0.073982
- Orbital period (sidereal): 5.61 yr (2,048.1 d)
- Mean anomaly: 144.322°
- Mean motion: 0° 10^{m} 32.783^{s} / day
- Inclination: 15.0642°
- Longitude of ascending node: 137.809°
- Argument of perihelion: 254.250°

Physical characteristics
- Dimensions: 97+7 −8 km
- Mass: (1.2±1.2)×10^{18} kg (Note: Calculated from its standard gravitational parameter GM = 0.08±0.08 km^{3}/s^{2}.) (SB441)
- Mean density: 2.5±2.6 g/cm^{3} (calculated)
- Synodic rotation period: 36.0105 h (1.50044 d)
- Geometric albedo: 0.0510±0.002
- Absolute magnitude (H): 8.72

357 Ninina is a large main-belt asteroid. It was discovered by Auguste Charlois on February 11, 1893, in Nice. The reference of its name is not known, though Ninine is a French personal name. This minor planet is orbiting at a distance of 3.16 AU from the Sun with a period of 5.61 years and an orbital eccentricity (ovalness) of 0.074. The orbital plane is inclined at an angle of 15.1° to the plane of the ecliptic.

Photometric observations of 357 Ninina during 2023 provided a light curve that presents an Earth commensurate rotation period of 36.00±0.01 h with a brightness amplitude of 0.08±0.01 in magnitude. In 2024, spin shape modelling using the light curve inversion technique show a blocky, rounded figure, with a refined rotation period of 35.9840±0.0005 h
