= 373 Melusina =

Main-belt asteroid

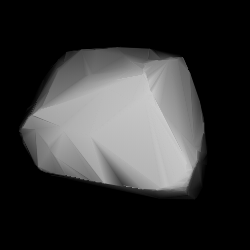
- Modelled shape of Melusina from its lightcurve

Discovery
- Discovered by: Auguste Charlois
- Discovery date: 15 September 1893

Designations
- Pronunciation: /ˌmɛl(j)ʊˈsiːnə/ MEL-(y)uu-SEE-nə
- Named after: ? Melusina
- Alternative designations: 1893 AJ · A893 RA
- Minor planet category: Main belt

Orbital characteristics
- Epoch 31 July 2016 (JD 2457600.5)
- Uncertainty parameter 0
- Observation arc: 111.58 yr (40753 d)
- Aphelion: 3.5593 AU (532.46 Gm)
- Perihelion: 2.67382 AU (399.998 Gm)
- Semi-major axis: 3.11658 AU (466.234 Gm)
- Eccentricity: 0.14207
- Orbital period (sidereal): 5.50 yr (2009.6 d)
- Mean anomaly: 127.53°
- Mean motion: 0° 10^{m} 44.904^{s} / day
- Inclination: 15.432°
- Longitude of ascending node: 3.8355°
- Argument of perihelion: 347.763°

Physical characteristics
- Dimensions: 103+6 −3 km
- Mass: (9.0±9.0)×10^{17} kg (Note: Calculated from its standard gravitational parameter GM = 0.06±0.06 km^{3}/s^{2}.) (SB441)
- Mean density: 1.6±1.6 g/cm^{3} (calculated)
- Synodic rotation period: 12.97 h (0.540 d)
- Geometric albedo: 0.0429±0.004
- Spectral type: C
- Absolute magnitude (H): 9.13

373 Melusina (prov. designation: A893 RA or 1893 AJ) is a large Main belt asteroid. It is classified as a C-type asteroid and is probably composed of carbonaceous material. It was discovered by Auguste Charlois on 15 September 1893 in Nice.
