= 300 Geraldina =

Outer main-belt asteroid

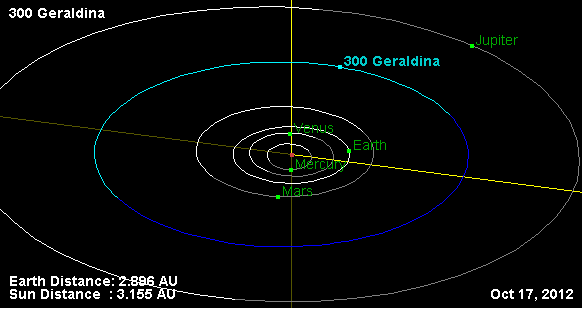
- Orbital diagram

Discovery
- Discovered by: Auguste Charlois
- Discovery date: 3 October 1890

Designations
- Alternative designations: A890 TB, 1923 LB; 1933 BV, 1950 DV; 1953 PJ, 1953 RO_{1} 1961 AD
- Minor planet category: Main belt

Orbital characteristics
- Epoch 31 July 2016 (JD 2457600.5)
- Uncertainty parameter 0
- Observation arc: 115.84 yr (42,312 d)
- Aphelion: 3.38735 AU (506.740 Gm)
- Perihelion: 3.02385 AU (452.362 Gm)
- Semi-major axis: 3.20560 AU (479.551 Gm)
- Eccentricity: 0.056698
- Orbital period (sidereal): 5.74 yr (2,096.3 d)
- Mean anomaly: 312.717°
- Mean motion: 0° 10^{m} 18.221^{s} / day
- Inclination: 0.732270°
- Longitude of ascending node: 42.6693°
- Argument of perihelion: 325.681°

Physical characteristics
- Dimensions: 80.18±2.3 km
- Synodic rotation period: 6.8423 h (0.28510 d)
- Geometric albedo: 0.0397±0.002
- Absolute magnitude (H): 9.8

300 Geraldina is a large Main belt asteroid. It was discovered by Auguste Charlois on October 3, 1890, in Nice. The origin of the name is unknown. It is orbiting the Sun at a distance of 3.21 AU with a period of 5.74 yr and an eccentricity (ovalness) of 0.057. The orbital plane is tilted at an angle of 0.73° to the plane of the ecliptic.

Light curve analysis based on photometric observations of this asteroid made during 2005 show a rotation period of 6.842±0.001 h with a brightness variation of 0.18 in magnitude.
