= 360 Carlova =

Main-belt asteroid

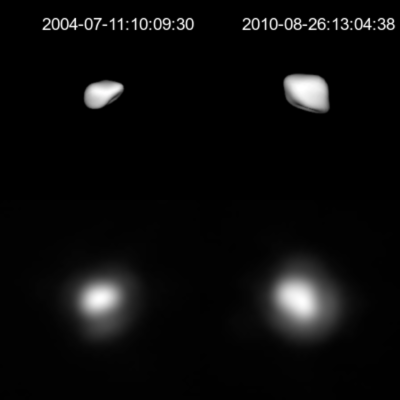
- Lightcurve-base 3D-model of Carlova on the top with an image of the asteroid on the bottom.

Discovery
- Discovered by: Auguste Charlois
- Discovery date: 11 March 1893

Designations
- Alternative designations: 1893 N
- Minor planet category: Main belt
- Adjectives: Carlovian

Orbital characteristics
- Epoch 31 July 2016 (JD 2457600.5)
- Uncertainty parameter 0
- Observation arc: 111.79 yr (40832 d)
- Aphelion: 3.53698 AU (529.125 Gm)
- Perihelion: 2.46807 AU (369.218 Gm)
- Semi-major axis: 3.00253 AU (449.172 Gm)
- Eccentricity: 0.17800
- Orbital period (sidereal): 5.20 yr (1900.3 d)
- Mean anomaly: 350.473°
- Mean motion: 0° 11^{m} 21.988^{s} / day
- Inclination: 11.6967°
- Longitude of ascending node: 132.551°
- Argument of perihelion: 287.862°

Physical characteristics
- Mean diameter: 135±3 km
- Mass: (1.96±0.37)×10^{18} kg (Note: Calculated from its standard gravitational parameter GM = 0.131±0.025 km^{3}/s^{2}.)
- Mean density: 1.52±0.31 g/cm^{3}
- Synodic rotation period: 6.189594 h (0.2578998 d)
- Pole ecliptic longitude: 355° ± 7°
- Pole ecliptic latitude: 56° ± 5°
- Geometric albedo: 0.043±0.006
- Spectral type: C
- Absolute magnitude (H): 8.49

360 Carlova is a very large main-belt asteroid. It is classified as a C-type asteroid and is probably composed of carbonaceous material. Dust activity due to sublimation has been detected on this asteroid, suggesting the presence of water ice in its interior.

The asteroid has a convex, roughly ellipsoid shape. The sidereal rotation period is 6.1896 hours with an axis of rotation along the ecliptic coordinates (l, b) = (355°±7°, 56°±5°). It was discovered by Auguste Charlois on 11 March 1893 in Nice.
