= 362 Havnia =

Main-belt asteroid

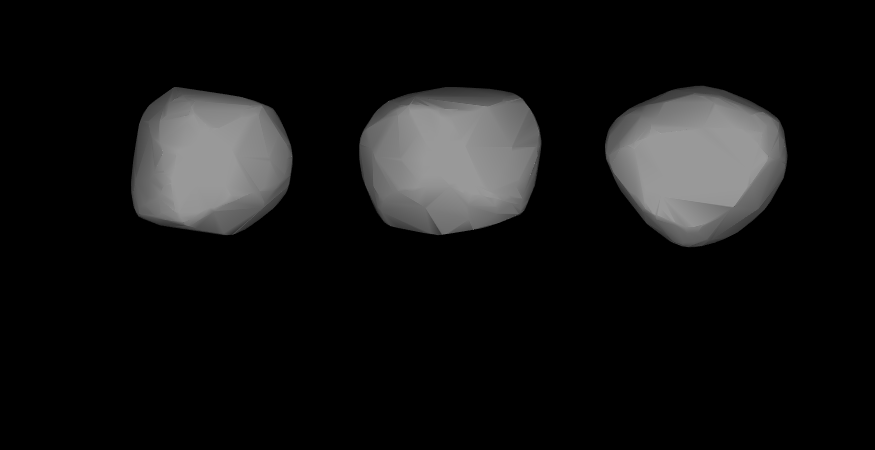
- Lightcurve-base 3D-model of 362 Havnia.

Discovery
- Discovered by: Auguste Charlois
- Discovery date: 12 March 1893

Designations
- Pronunciation: /ˈhævniə/
- Named after: Copenhagen
- Alternative designations: 1893 R
- Minor planet category: Main belt

Orbital characteristics
- Epoch 31 July 2016 (JD 2457600.5)
- Uncertainty parameter 0
- Observation arc: 116.44 yr (42,528 d)
- Aphelion: 2.69 AU (402.27 Gm)
- Perihelion: 2.47 AU (369.18 Gm)
- Semi-major axis: 2.58 AU (385.73 Gm)
- Eccentricity: 0.042895
- Orbital period (sidereal): 4.14 yr (1,512.3 d)
- Mean anomaly: 42.5974°
- Mean motion: 0° 14^{m} 16.984^{s} / day
- Inclination: 8.06864°
- Longitude of ascending node: 27.3489°
- Argument of perihelion: 29.6504°

Physical characteristics
- Mean diameter: 92+6 −5 km/84 ± 1 km (pole solution 1); 91+8 −3 km/88 ± 1 km (pole solution 2)
- Mass: (8.5±1.9)×10^{17} kg (Note: Calculated from its standard gravitational parameter GM = 0.057±0.013 km^{3}/s^{2}.)
- Mean density: 2.09–2.75 g/cm^{3} (calculated)
- Synodic rotation period: 16.92665±0.00003 h (pole solution 1); 16.92668±0.00003 h (pole solution 2)
- Pole ecliptic longitude: 14° ± 2° or 208° ± 8°
- Pole ecliptic latitude: 33° ± 2° or 35° ± 4°
- Geometric albedo: 0.044+0.006 −0.004 (pole solution 1); 0.046+0.004 −0.008 (pole solution 2)
- Absolute magnitude (H): 9.00

362 Havnia is a typical Main belt asteroid.

It was discovered by Auguste Charlois on 12 March 1893 in Nice, France.

It is spinning with a rotation period of 16.92 hours. The inferred shape of this object resembles a Maclaurin spheroid.
