= 284 Amalia =

Main-belt asteroid

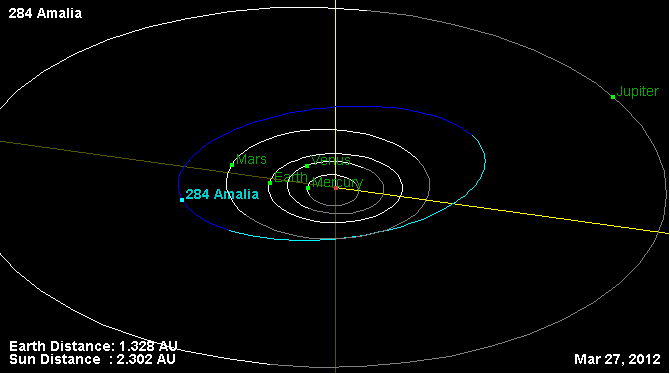
- Orbital diagram

Discovery
- Discovered by: Auguste Charlois
- Discovery date: 29 May 1889

Designations
- Pronunciation: /əˈmɑːliə/
- Alternative designations: A889 KA
- Minor planet category: Main belt

Orbital characteristics
- Epoch 31 July 2016 (JD 2457600.5)
- Uncertainty parameter 0
- Observation arc: 122.66 yr (44,800 d)
- Aphelion: 2.88122 AU (431.024 Gm)
- Perihelion: 1.83631 AU (274.708 Gm)
- Semi-major axis: 2.35876 AU (352.865 Gm)
- Eccentricity: 0.22149
- Orbital period (sidereal): 3.62 yr (1,323.2 d)
- Average orbital speed: 19.39 km/s
- Mean anomaly: 0.0848612°
- Mean motion: 0° 16^{m} 19.445^{s} / day
- Inclination: 8.05647°
- Longitude of ascending node: 233.716°
- Time of perihelion: 2023-Oct-29
- Argument of perihelion: 58.0568°

Physical characteristics
- Dimensions: 52.95±2.6 km
- Synodic rotation period: 8.545 h (0.3560 d)
- Geometric albedo: 0.0602±0.006
- Absolute magnitude (H): 10.05

284 Amalia is a large main belt asteroid. It was discovered by Auguste Charlois on 29 May 1889 in Nice. This is classified as a Ch-type asteroid in the Bus taxonomy and CX in the Tholen system. It has been observed occulting stars on five occasions as of 2018, which provide a diameter estimate of 54±3 km via a fitted ellipse plot.
