= 285 Regina =

Main-belt asteroid

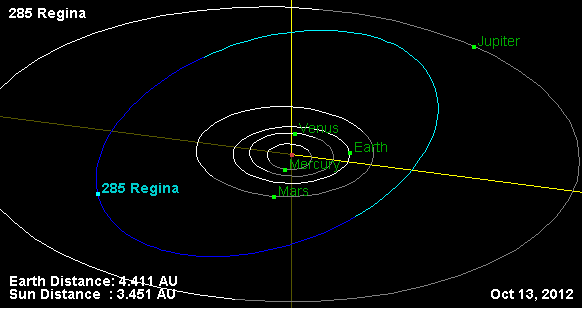
- Orbital diagram

Discovery
- Discovered by: Auguste Charlois
- Discovery date: 3 August 1889

Designations
- Pronunciation: /rɪˈdʒaɪnə/ rij-EYE-nə
- Alternative designations: A889 PA, 1911 QJ; 1951 AC_{1}
- Minor planet category: Main belt

Orbital characteristics
- Epoch 31 July 2016 (JD 2457600.5)
- Uncertainty parameter 0
- Observation arc: 104.63 yr (38215 d)
- Aphelion: 3.72130 AU (556.699 Gm)
- Perihelion: 2.44540 AU (365.827 Gm)
- Semi-major axis: 3.08335 AU (461.263 Gm)
- Eccentricity: 0.20690
- Orbital period (sidereal): 5.41 yr (1977.6 d)
- Average orbital speed: 16.97 km/s
- Mean anomaly: 137.349°
- Mean motion: 0° 10^{m} 55.348^{s} / day
- Inclination: 17.6192°
- Longitude of ascending node: 311.385°
- Argument of perihelion: 14.4439°

Physical characteristics
- Dimensions: 45.13±2.2 km
- Synodic rotation period: 9.542 h (0.3976 d)
- Geometric albedo: 0.0547±0.006
- Temperature: unknown
- Absolute magnitude (H): 10.7

285 Regina is a typical, although fairly large, Main belt asteroid. It was discovered by Auguste Charlois on 3 August 1889 in Nice, France. The asteroid is a suspected interloper in the Eucharis asteroid family.

Analysis of the asteroid light curve generated from photometric data collected during 2008 show a rotation period of 9.542±0.001 h with a brightness variation of 0.16±0.03 in magnitude.
