= 430 Hybris =

Main-belt asteroid

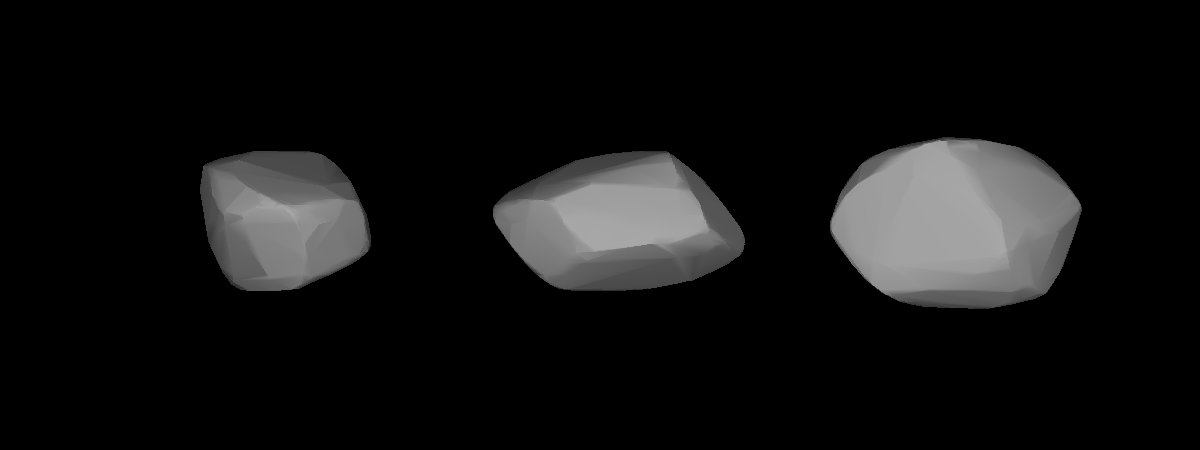
- Lightcurve-base 3D-model of 430 Hybris.

Discovery
- Discovered by: Auguste Charlois
- Discovery date: 18 December 1897

Designations
- Pronunciation: /ˈhaɪbrɪs/
- Alternative designations: 1897 DM
- Minor planet category: Main belt

Orbital characteristics
- Epoch 31 July 2016 (JD 2457600.5)
- Uncertainty parameter 0
- Observation arc: 79.91 yr (29186 d)
- Aphelion: 3.57071 AU (534.171 Gm)
- Perihelion: 2.11889 AU (316.981 Gm)
- Semi-major axis: 2.84480 AU (425.576 Gm)
- Eccentricity: 0.25517
- Orbital period (sidereal): 4.80 yr (1752.6 d)
- Mean anomaly: 273.205°
- Mean motion: 0° 12^{m} 19.483^{s} / day
- Inclination: 14.5947°
- Longitude of ascending node: 249.440°
- Argument of perihelion: 179.036°

Physical characteristics
- Dimensions: 33.33±0.9 km
- Synodic rotation period: 7.205 h (0.3002 d)
- Geometric albedo: 0.1206±0.007
- Absolute magnitude (H): 11.0

430 Hybris is a typical Main belt asteroid.

It was discovered by Auguste Charlois on 18 December 1897 in Nice.
