= 411 Xanthe =

Main-belt asteroid

Discovery
- Discovered by: Auguste Charlois
- Discovery site: Nice Observatory
- Discovery date: 7 January 1896

Designations
- Pronunciation: /ˈzænθiː/
- Named after: Xanthe (Greek mythology)
- Alternative designations: 1896 CJ
- Minor planet category: main-belt

Orbital characteristics
- Epoch 4 September 2017 (JD 2458000.5)
- Uncertainty parameter 0
- Observation arc: 121.31 yr (44,307 days)
- Aphelion: 3.2765 AU
- Perihelion: 2.5902 AU
- Semi-major axis: 2.9334 AU
- Eccentricity: 0.1170
- Orbital period (sidereal): 5.02 yr (1,835 days)
- Mean anomaly: 248.70°
- Mean motion: 0° 11^{m} 46.32^{s} / day
- Inclination: 15.344°
- Longitude of ascending node: 107.45°
- Argument of perihelion: 181.53°

Physical characteristics
- Dimensions: 76.53±2.3 km
- Synodic rotation period: 11.344 h (0.4727 d)
- Geometric albedo: 0.0831±0.005
- Absolute magnitude (H): 9.3

411 Xanthe is an asteroid from the outer regions of the asteroid belt, approximately 77 kilometers in diameter. It was discovered by French astronomer Auguste Charlois at Nice Observatory on 7 January 1896. The asteroid was named after Xanthe, an Oceanid or sea nymph, and one of the many Oceanid daughters of Oceanus and Tethys from Greek mythology.
