= 338 Budrosa =

Main-belt asteroid

338 Budrosaa
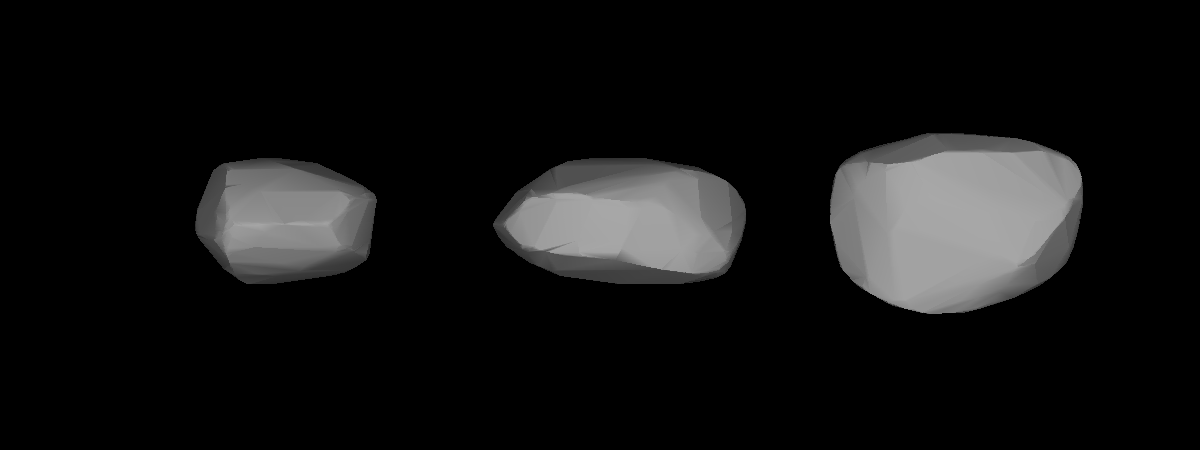
- Lightcurve-based 3D model of 338 Budrosaa

Discovery
- Discovered by: Auguste Charlois
- Discovery date: 25 September 1892

Designations
- Pronunciation: /bʊˈdroʊsə/
- Named after: (unknown)
- Alternative designations: 1892 F
- Minor planet category: Main belt

Orbital characteristics
- Epoch 31 July 2016 (JD 2457600.5)
- Uncertainty parameter 0
- Observation arc: 123.53 yr (45120 d)
- Aphelion: 2.9782 AU (445.53 Gm)
- Perihelion: 2.84739 AU (425.963 Gm)
- Semi-major axis: 2.91280 AU (435.749 Gm)
- Eccentricity: 0.022453
- Orbital period (sidereal): 4.97 yr (1815.8 d)
- Mean anomaly: 301.163°
- Mean motion: 0° 11^{m} 53.743^{s} / day
- Inclination: 6.0484°
- Longitude of ascending node: 287.440°
- Argument of perihelion: 111.891°

Physical characteristics
- Dimensions: 63.11±8.8 km
- Mass: (8.4±2.7)×10^{17} kg (Note: Calculated from its standard gravitational parameter GM = 0.056±0.018 km^{3}/s^{2}.)
- Mean density: 12.43 g/cm^{3} (Note: Assuming a diameter of 50.5 km.)
- Synodic rotation period: 4.6084 h (0.19202 d)
- Geometric albedo: 0.1766±0.062
- Spectral type: M
- Absolute magnitude (H): 8.5

338 Budrosa is a large Main belt asteroid. It is classified as an M-type asteroid. It was discovered by Auguste Charlois on 25 September 1892 in Nice.
