= 371 Bohemia =

Main-belt asteroid

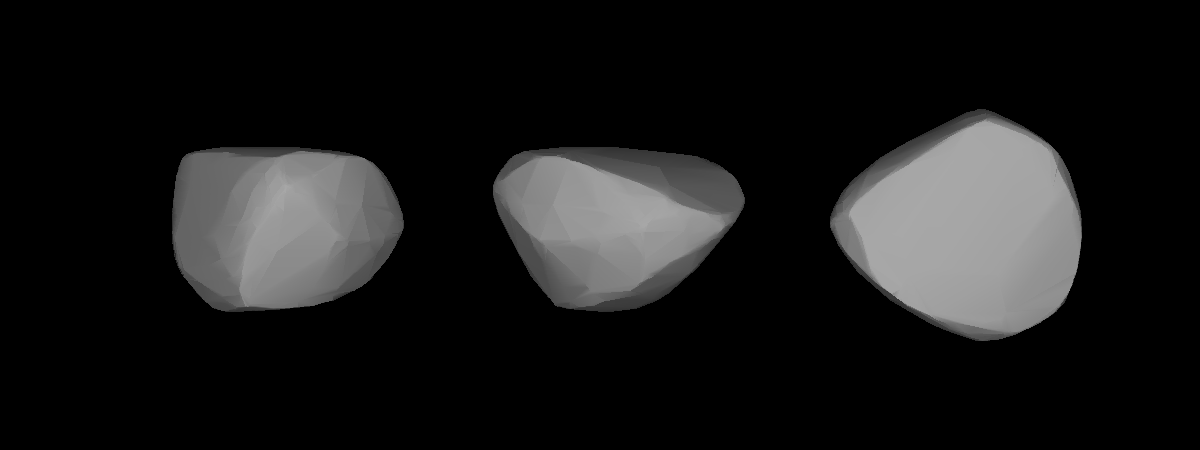
- A three-dimensional model of 371 Bohemia based on its light curve

Discovery
- Discovered by: Auguste Charlois
- Discovery date: 16 July 1893

Designations
- Pronunciation: /boʊˈhiːmiə/
- Named after: Bohemia
- Alternative designations: 1893 AD
- Minor planet category: Main belt

Orbital characteristics
- Epoch 31 July 2016 (JD 2457600.5)
- Uncertainty parameter 0
- Observation arc: 122.48 yr (44734 d)
- Aphelion: 2.90152 AU (434.061 Gm)
- Perihelion: 2.55097 AU (381.620 Gm)
- Semi-major axis: 2.72624 AU (407.840 Gm)
- Eccentricity: 0.064292
- Orbital period (sidereal): 4.50 yr (1644.2 d)
- Mean anomaly: 143.157°
- Mean motion: 0° 13^{m} 8.242^{s} / day
- Inclination: 7.39621°
- Longitude of ascending node: 283.442°
- Argument of perihelion: 343.529°

Physical characteristics
- Dimensions: 54.64±1.1 km
- Synodic rotation period: 10.7391 h (0.44746 d)
- Geometric albedo: 0.1924±0.008
- Absolute magnitude (H): 8.72

371 Bohemia is a sizeable Main belt asteroid. It was discovered by Auguste Charlois on 16 July 1893 in Nice.
