= 432 Pythia =

Main-belt asteroid

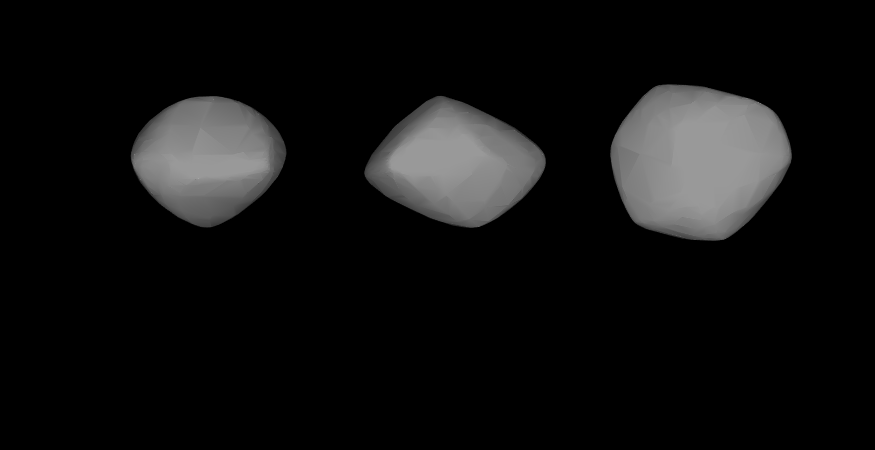
- Lightcurve-base 3D-model of 432 Pythia.

Discovery
- Discovered by: Auguste Charlois
- Discovery date: 18 December 1897

Designations
- Pronunciation: /ˈpɪθiə/
- Named after: The Pythia
- Alternative designations: 1897 DO
- Minor planet category: Main belt

Orbital characteristics
- Epoch 31 July 2016 (JD 2457600.5)
- Uncertainty parameter 0
- Observation arc: 115.48 yr (42179 d)
- Aphelion: 2.71405 AU (406.016 Gm)
- Perihelion: 2.02374 AU (302.747 Gm)
- Semi-major axis: 2.36890 AU (354.382 Gm)
- Eccentricity: 0.14570
- Orbital period (sidereal): 3.65 yr (1331.7 d)
- Mean anomaly: 4.40721°
- Mean motion: 0° 16^{m} 13.166^{s} / day
- Inclination: 12.1207°
- Longitude of ascending node: 88.7589°
- Argument of perihelion: 173.983°

Physical characteristics
- Dimensions: 46.90±0.8 km
- Synodic rotation period: 8.252 h (0.3438 d)
- Geometric albedo: 0.2338±0.009
- Absolute magnitude (H): 8.84

432 Pythia is a typical Main belt asteroid.

It was discovered by Auguste Charlois on 18 December 1897 in Nice.
