= 389 Industria =

Main-belt asteroid

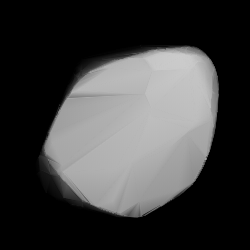
- Modelled shape of Industria from its lightcurve

Discovery
- Discovered by: A. Charlois
- Discovery site: Nice Obs.
- Discovery date: 8 March 1894

Designations
- Pronunciation: /ɪnˈdʌstriə/
- Named after: Latin for diligence
- Alternative designations: A894 EE · 1938 XG; 1946 OJ · A910 EA; 1894 BB
- Minor planet category: main-belt · (middle); background

Orbital characteristics
- Epoch 31 May 2020 (JD 2459000.5)
- Uncertainty parameter 0
- Observation arc: 125.90 yr (45,985 d)
- Aphelion: 2.7829 AU
- Perihelion: 2.4337 AU
- Semi-major axis: 2.6083 AU
- Eccentricity: 0.0670
- Orbital period (sidereal): 4.21 yr (1,539 d)
- Mean anomaly: 316.57°
- Mean motion: 0° 14^{m} 2.4^{s} / day
- Inclination: 8.1219°
- Longitude of ascending node: 282.28°
- Argument of perihelion: 264.91°

Physical characteristics
- Mean diameter: 79.6±3.9 km (composite estimate) Individual estimates: 74.378±1.883 km; 79.23±2.4 km; 79.32±0.95 km
- Mass: (6.44±0.30)×10^{17} kg (2025) (Note: Calculated from its standard gravitational parameter GM = 0.043±0.002 km^{3}/s^{2}.) (6.80±0.24)×10^{17} kg (2023)
- Mean density: 3.02 g/cm^{3} (2025) (Note: Assuming a diameter of 74.4 km.); 2.58±0.39 g/cm^{3} (2023) (Note: Assuming a diameter of 79.6 ± 3.9 km.)
- Synodic rotation period: 8.53 h
- Geometric albedo: 0.1983±0.012; 0.201±0.006; 0.225±0.046
- Spectral type: Tholen = S; SMASS = S; B–V = 0.855±0.039; U–B = 0.420±0.056
- Absolute magnitude (H): 7.8

389 Industria (prov. designation: A894 EE or 1894 BB) is a large background asteroid, approximately 79 kilometers (49 miles) in diameter, located in the central region of the asteroid belt. It was discovered on 8 March 1894, by French astronomer Auguste Charlois at the Nice Observatory. The stony S-type asteroid has a rotation period of 8.5 hours. It was named after the Latin word for "diligence".
