= 331 Etheridgea =

Main-belt asteroid

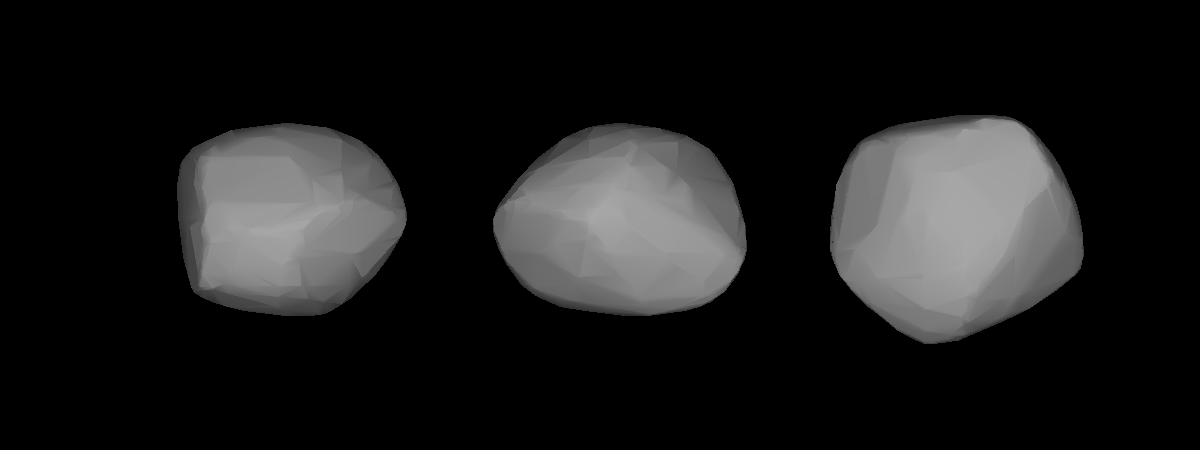
- Lightcurve-based 3D model of 331 Etheridgea

Discovery
- Discovered by: Auguste Charlois
- Discovery date: 1 April 1892

Designations
- Pronunciation: /ˌɛθəˈrɪdʒiə/
- Named after: Possibly Robert Etheridge
- Minor planet category: Main belt

Orbital characteristics
- Epoch 31 July 2016 (JD 2457600.5)
- Uncertainty parameter 0
- Observation arc: 123.95 yr (45,274 d)
- Aphelion: 3.32623 AU (497.597 Gm)
- Perihelion: 2.72055 AU (406.988 Gm)
- Semi-major axis: 3.02339 AU (452.293 Gm)
- Eccentricity: 0.10016
- Orbital period (sidereal): 5.26 yr (1,920.2 d)
- Mean anomaly: 88.5392°
- Mean motion: 0° 11^{m} 14.939^{s} / day
- Inclination: 6.05385°
- Longitude of ascending node: 22.0346°
- Argument of perihelion: 333.055°

Physical characteristics
- Dimensions: 74.92±2.7 km
- Synodic rotation period: 25.315 h (1.0548 d)
- Geometric albedo: 0.0447±0.003
- Absolute magnitude (H): 9.62

331 Etheridgea is a large main belt asteroid. It was discovered by Auguste Charlois on 1 April 1892 in Nice. The meaning of the name is unknown. This asteroid is orbiting the Sun at a distance of 3.02 AU with a period of 5.26 years and an eccentricity (ovalness) of 0.10. The orbital plane is tilted at an angle of 6.05° to the plane of the ecliptic.

Analysis of the asteroid light curve generated from photometric data collected in 2015 provided a rotation period of 25.315±0.001 h. This result is completely different from the previous rotation period estimates. It is a low albedo, carbonaceous C-type asteroid and spans a girth of 74.9±2.7 km.

It may have been named for the geologist and paleontologist Robert Etheridge (1819–1903).
