= 395 Delia =

Main-belt asteroid

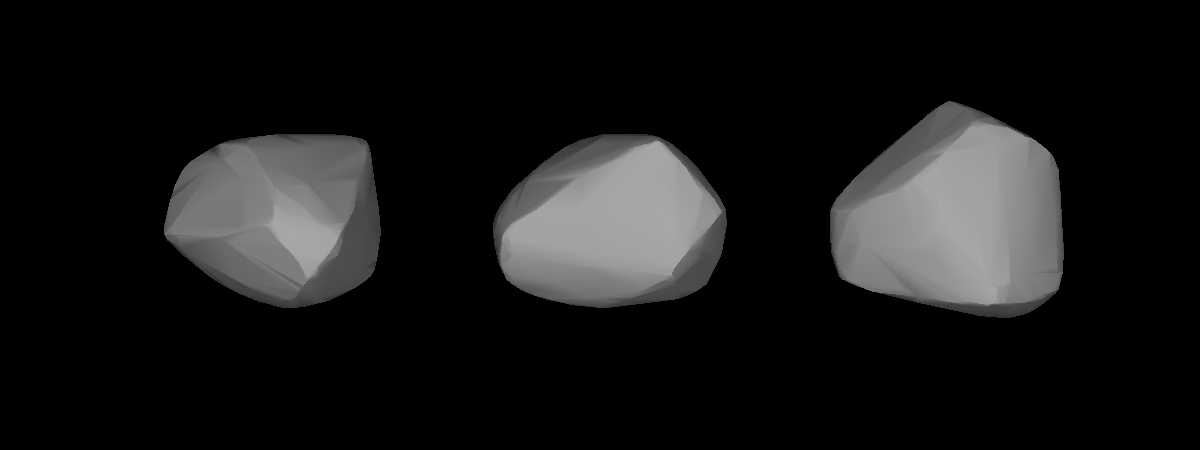
- Lightcurve-base 3D-model of 395 Delia.

Discovery
- Discovered by: Auguste Charlois
- Discovery date: 30 November 1894

Designations
- Pronunciation: /ˈdiːliə/
- Named after: Artemis Delia
- Alternative designations: 1894 BK
- Minor planet category: Main belt

Orbital characteristics
- Epoch January 21, 2022 (JD 2459600.5)
- Uncertainty parameter 0
- Observation arc: 89.57 yr (32,714 d)
- Aphelion: 3.021 AU (451.9 Gm)
- Perihelion: 2.550 AU (381.5 Gm)
- Semi-major axis: 2.785 AU (416.6 Gm)
- Eccentricity: 0.085
- Orbital period (sidereal): 4.64 yr (1,696.3 d)
- Mean anomaly: 277.5°
- Mean motion: 0° 12^{m} 43.2^{s} / day
- Inclination: 3.35°
- Longitude of ascending node: 259.3°
- Argument of perihelion: 11.1°

Physical characteristics
- Dimensions: 56±3 km 55±3 km
- Synodic rotation period: 19.681 h (0.82 d)
- Geometric albedo: 0.033±0.004
- Spectral type: C (Tholen)
- Absolute magnitude (H): 10.38

395 Delia is a large Main belt asteroid. It was discovered by the French astronomer Auguste Charlois on 30 November 1894 in Nice. "Delia" is an epithet for the ancient Greco-Roman Moon goddess Artemis, for her birthplace at Delos. This asteroid is orbiting the Sun at a distance of 2.79 AU with an orbital eccentricity (ovalness) of 0.085 and a period of 4.64 yr. The orbital plane is tilted at an angle of 3.35° to the plane of the ecliptic.

This is a dark, carbonaceous body with a low albedo of 0.03 and is classified as a C-type asteroid in the Tholen taxonomy. It has an estimated cross-section of 44.2 km/s and is spinning with a rotation period of 19.7 hours.
