= 441 Bathilde =

Main-belt asteroid

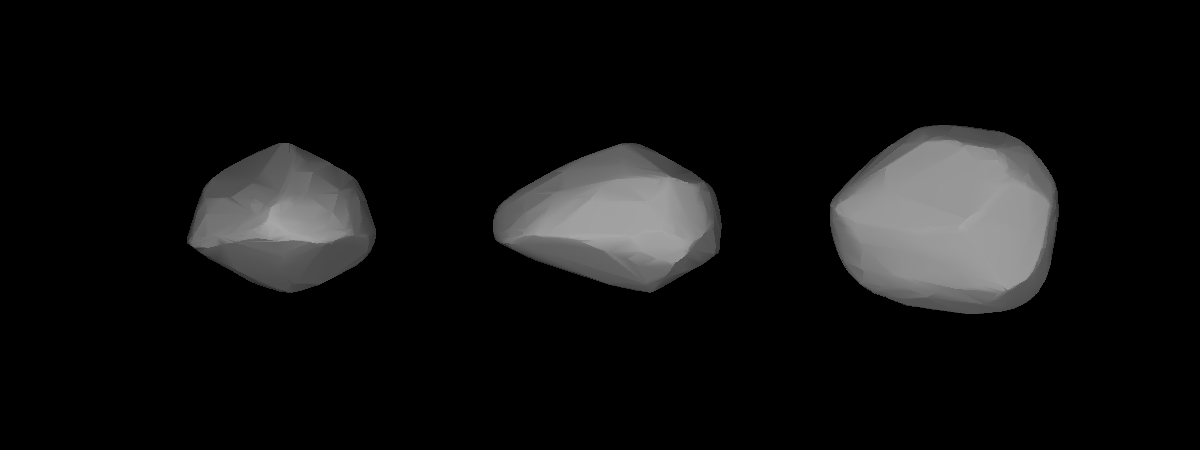
- A three-dimensional model of 441 Bathilde based on its light curve

Discovery
- Discovered by: Auguste Charlois
- Discovery date: 8 December 1898

Designations
- Pronunciation: French: [batildᵊ]
- Named after: unknown (Bathilde)
- Alternative designations: 1898 ED
- Minor planet category: Main belt

Orbital characteristics
- Epoch 31 July 2016 (JD 2457600.5)
- Uncertainty parameter 0
- Observation arc: 117.20 yr (42808 d)
- Aphelion: 3.0266 AU (452.77 Gm)
- Perihelion: 2.58642 AU (386.923 Gm)
- Semi-major axis: 2.80651 AU (419.848 Gm)
- Eccentricity: 0.078421
- Orbital period (sidereal): 4.70 yr (1717.3 d)
- Mean anomaly: 348.249°
- Mean motion: 0° 12^{m} 34.668^{s} / day
- Inclination: 8.1476°
- Longitude of ascending node: 253.585°
- Argument of perihelion: 201.62°
- Earth MOID: 1.60331 AU (239.852 Gm)
- Jupiter MOID: 2.16565 AU (323.977 Gm)
- T_{Jupiter}: 3.304

Physical characteristics
- Mean diameter: 75.3+74.6 −10.0 km/76.8+15.9 −9.1 km (LCI + occ); 72±2 km (thermophysical)
- Mass: (7.3±2.1)×10^{17} kg (Note: Calculated from its standard gravitational parameter GM = 0.049±0.014 km^{3}/s^{2}.)
- Mean density: 3.10–3.76 g/cm^{3} (calculated)
- Synodic rotation period: 10.443130+0.000009 −0.000005 h
- Pole ecliptic longitude: 125°+9° −7° or 287°+8° −15°
- Pole ecliptic latitude: 39°+24° −26° or 52°+23° −13°
- Geometric albedo: 0.14 ± 0.02 (composite estimate)
- Absolute magnitude (H): 8.51

441 Bathilde is a large main belt asteroid that was discovered by French astronomer Auguste Charlois on 8 December 1898 in Nice. 441 Bathilde is orbiting close to a 5:2 mean motion resonance with Jupiter, which is located at 2.824 AU.

10μ radiometric data collected from Kitt Peak in 1975 gave a diameter estimate of 64 km.
