= 356 Liguria =

Main-belt asteroid

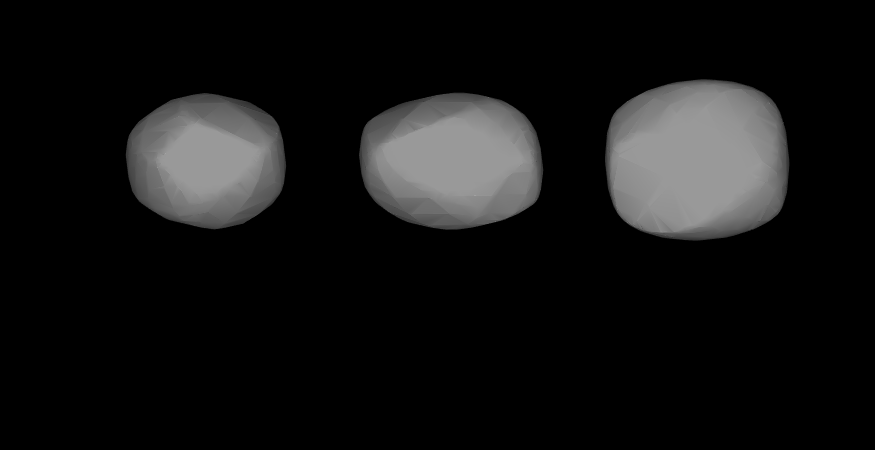
- Lightcurve-base 3D-model of 356 Liguria.

Discovery
- Discovered by: Auguste Charlois
- Discovery date: 21 January 1893

Designations
- Pronunciation: /lɪˈɡjʊəriə/
- Named after: Liguria
- Alternative designations: 1893 G
- Minor planet category: Main belt

Orbital characteristics
- Epoch 31 July 2016 (JD 2457600.5)
- Uncertainty parameter 0
- Observation arc: 123.10 yr (44961 d)
- Aphelion: 3.4123 AU (510.47 Gm)
- Perihelion: 2.10382 AU (314.727 Gm)
- Semi-major axis: 2.75806 AU (412.600 Gm)
- Eccentricity: 0.23721
- Orbital period (sidereal): 4.58 yr (1673.0 d)
- Mean anomaly: 28.9708°
- Mean motion: 0° 12^{m} 54.648^{s} / day
- Inclination: 8.2243°
- Longitude of ascending node: 354.796°
- Argument of perihelion: 78.566°

Physical characteristics
- Mean diameter: 139.97±6.22 km (composite estimate); 145.5±1.4 km
- Mass: (1.65±0.19)×10^{18} kg (Note: Calculated from its standard gravitational parameter GM = 0.110±0.013 km^{3}/s^{2}.)
- Mean density: 1.02 g/cm^{3} (Note: Assuming a diameter of 146 km.)
- Synodic rotation period: 31.82 h (1.326 d)
- Geometric albedo: 0.0528±0.002
- Absolute magnitude (H): 8.22

356 Liguria is a very large main-belt asteroid that was discovered by Auguste Charlois on January 21, 1893, in Nice. It is one of seven of Charlois's discoveries that was expressly named by the Astromomisches Rechen-Institut (Astronomical Calculation Institute), and was named for the Italian region.

13-cm radar observations of this asteroid from the Arecibo Observatory between 1980 and 1985 were used to produce a diameter estimate of 155 km.

Since 1991, the asteroid has been observed in stellar occultation a total of 6 times, all but one were single chord occultations. A 2006 double chord observation indicated a diameter of 126.6 +/-8.3 km.
