= 310 Margarita =

Main-belt asteroid

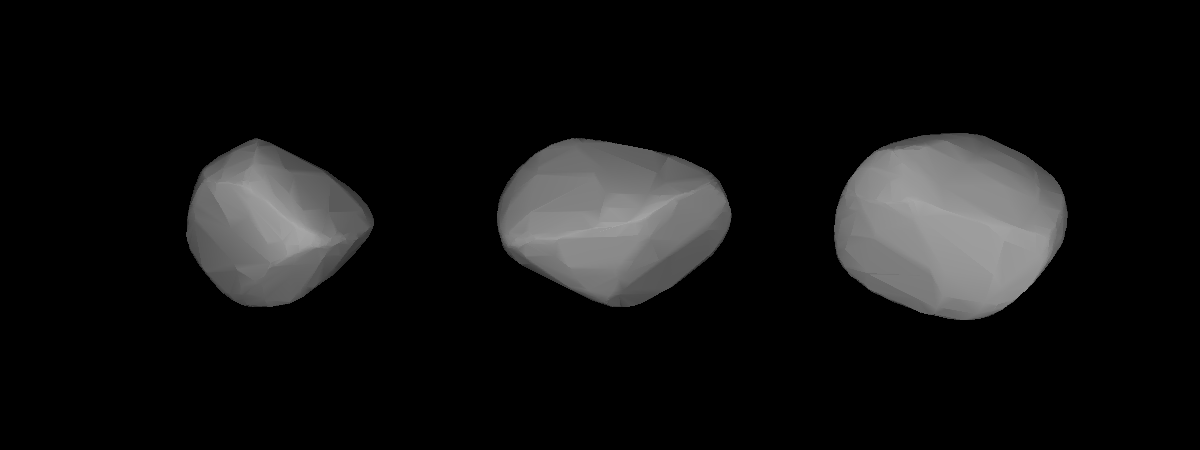
- A three-dimensional model of 310 Margarita based on its lightcurve

Discovery
- Discovered by: Auguste Charlois
- Discovery date: 16 May 1891

Designations
- Minor planet category: Main belt

Orbital characteristics
- Epoch 31 July 2016 (JD 2457600.5)
- Uncertainty parameter 0
- Observation arc: 95.51 yr (34884 d)
- Aphelion: 3.07625 AU (460.200 Gm)
- Perihelion: 2.44950 AU (366.440 Gm)
- Semi-major axis: 2.76287 AU (413.319 Gm)
- Eccentricity: 0.11342
- Orbital period (sidereal): 4.592 yr (1,677.4 d)
- Mean anomaly: 138.002°
- Mean motion: 0° 12^{m} 52.618^{s} / day
- Inclination: 3.17131°
- Longitude of ascending node: 229.278°
- Argument of perihelion: 324.626°

Physical characteristics
- Dimensions: 32.75±1.7 km
- Synodic rotation period: 12.070 h (0.5029 d)
- Geometric albedo: 0.1250±0.014
- Absolute magnitude (H): 10.1

310 Margarita is a typical Main belt asteroid. It was discovered by the French astronomer Auguste Charlois on 16 May 1891 in Nice. The intended meaning of the asteroid's name is unknown. This minor planet is orbiting the Sun at a distance of 2.76 AU with an period of 4.592 years and an orbital eccentricity of 0.113. The orbital plane is inclined at an angle of 3.17° to the plane of the ecliptic.

Photometric observations of 310 Margarita made during 2010 showed a synodic rotation period of 12.069±0.001 h with a brightness variation of 0.15±0.02 in magnitude. This rotation rate is nearly Earth commensurable, making observations from widely different longitudes particularly useful when studying the light curve of this object. 310 Margarita is a stony S-type asteroid with an estimated diameter of 33 km.
