= 345 Tercidina =

Main-belt asteroid

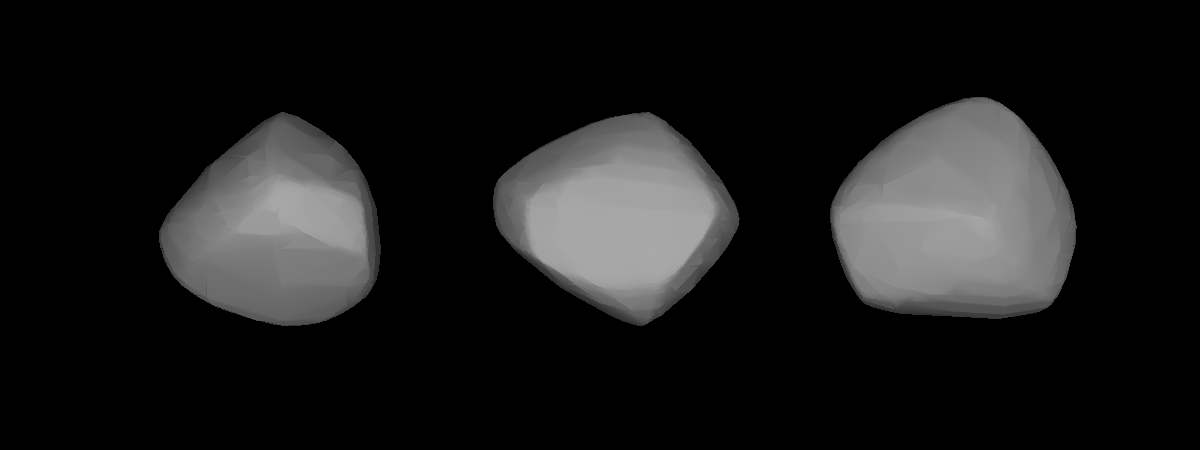
- A three-dimensional model of 345 Tercidina based on its lightcurve

Discovery
- Discovered by: Auguste Charlois
- Discovery date: 23 November 1892

Designations
- Pronunciation: /tɜːrsɪˈdaɪnə/
- Named after: (unknown)
- Alternative designations: 1892 O
- Minor planet category: Main belt

Orbital characteristics
- Epoch 31 July 2016 (JD 2457600.5)
- Uncertainty parameter 0
- Observation arc: 122.88 yr (44882 d)
- Aphelion: 2.46765 AU (369.155 Gm)
- Perihelion: 2.18337 AU (326.628 Gm)
- Semi-major axis: 2.32551 AU (347.891 Gm)
- Eccentricity: 0.061120
- Orbital period (sidereal): 3.55 yr (1295.3 d)
- Mean anomaly: 288.675°
- Mean motion: 0° 16^{m} 40.526^{s} / day
- Inclination: 9.74765°
- Longitude of ascending node: 212.629°
- Argument of perihelion: 230.279°

Physical characteristics
- Dimensions: 126x94x90 km
- Mean diameter: 99.09±1.40 km (composite estimate); 90.243 ± 24.561 km
- Mass: (1.17 ± 0.511) × 10^{18} kg (composite estimate) (5.4±2.5)×10^{17} kg (Note: Calculated from its standard gravitational parameter GM = 0.036±0.017 km^{3}/s^{2}.)
- Mean density: 2.30 ± 1.01 g/cm^{3} 1.39 g/cm^{3} (Note: Assuming a diameter of 90.2 km.)
- Synodic rotation period: 12.371 h (0.5155 d)
- Geometric albedo: 0.052±0.019
- Spectral type: C
- Absolute magnitude (H): 9.04

345 Tercidina is a large main-belt asteroid. It is classified as a C-type asteroid and is probably composed of carbonaceous material.

It was discovered by Auguste Charlois on 23 November 1892, in Nice.

== Size ==
Via asteroid occultations:

Observations of an occultation of a bright 5.5 magnitude star on 17 September 2002, produced seventy-five chords indicating an ellipsoid of 111×90 km.

Observations of an occultation on 15 November 2005, near Grass Valley, California, produced five chords indicating an incomplete outline of 126×111 km. This larger result may be caused by a different orientation of the asteroid as it passed in front of the star.
