= 297 Caecilia =

Main-belt asteroid

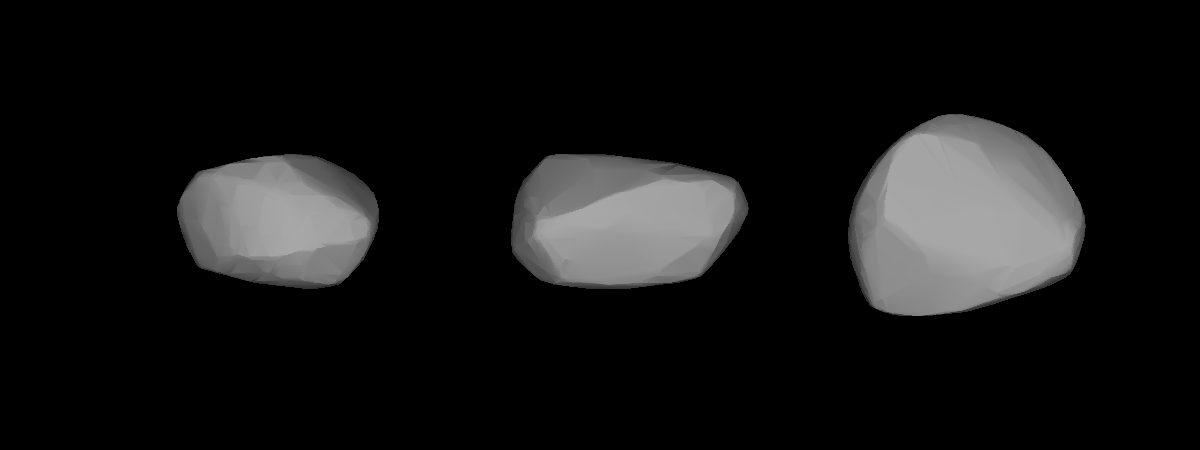
- A three-dimensional model of 297 Caecilia based on its lightcurve

Discovery
- Discovered by: Auguste Charlois
- Discovery date: 9 September 1890

Designations
- Pronunciation: /siːˈsɪliə/
- Alternative designations: A890 RA, 1924 RA; 1935 PB, 1947 SB; 1955 BK_{1}
- Minor planet category: Main Belt

Orbital characteristics
- Epoch 31 July 2016 (JD 2457600.5)
- Uncertainty parameter 0
- Observation arc: 115.88 yr (42326 d)
- Aphelion: 3.6149 AU (540.78 Gm)
- Perihelion: 2.7117 AU (405.66 Gm)
- Semi-major axis: 3.1633 AU (473.22 Gm)
- Eccentricity: 0.14276
- Orbital period (sidereal): 5.63 yr (2055.0 d)
- Mean anomaly: 116.75°
- Mean motion: 0° 10^{m} 30.684^{s} / day
- Inclination: 7.5526°
- Longitude of ascending node: 332.104°
- Argument of perihelion: 354.125°

Physical characteristics
- Mean diameter: 41 km
- Synodic rotation period: 4.151390+0.000005 −0.000003 h
- Pole ecliptic longitude: 53°+6° −1° or 227°+6° −3°
- Pole ecliptic latitude: −36°+11° −5° or −51°+11° −4°
- Geometric albedo: 0.1796±0.018
- Absolute magnitude (H): 9.1

297 Caecilia is a typical main belt asteroid. It was discovered by Auguste Charlois on 9 September 1890 in Nice.

Photometric observations during 2003 showed a rotation period of 6.163 ± 0.004 hours with a brightness variation of 0.15 in magnitude.
