= 380 Fiducia =

Main-belt asteroid

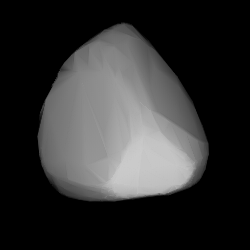
- Modelled shape of Fiducia from its lightcurve

Discovery
- Discovered by: Auguste Charlois
- Discovery site: Nice Observatory
- Discovery date: 8 January 1894

Designations
- Pronunciation: /faɪˈdjuːʃ(i)ə, fɪ-/
- Named after: confidence
- Alternative designations: A894 AB · 1933 CA · 1975 LX (Note: The MPC notates Fiducia's retroactive new-style designation as 1894 AB. Its old-style designation was 1894 AR.)
- Minor planet category: Main belt

Orbital characteristics
- Epoch 21 November 2025 (JD 2457600.5)
- Uncertainty parameter 0
- Observation arc: 131.81 yr (48145 d)
- Aphelion: 6.1639 AU (922.11 Gm)
- Perihelion: 2.3714 AU (354.76 Gm)
- Semi-major axis: 2.6789 AU (400.76 Gm)
- Eccentricity: 0.1148
- Orbital period (sidereal): 4.3846 yr (1601.5 d)
- Mean anomaly: 154.85°
- Mean motion: 0° 13^{m} 29.244^{s} / day
- Inclination: 6.1639°
- Longitude of ascending node: 95.004°
- Argument of perihelion: 240.62°
- Jupiter MOID: 2.3388 au (349.88 Gm)
- T_{Jupiter}: 3.360

Physical characteristics
- Mean diameter: 67.508±2.455 km
- Synodic rotation period: 13.69 h
- Geometric albedo: 0.0563±0.005
- Spectral type: C-type
- Absolute magnitude (H): 9.42

380 Fiducia (provisional designation A894 AB) is a dark and large asteroid, approximately 68 kilometers (42 miles) in diameter, located in the central region of the asteroid belt. It was discovered by French astronomer Auguste Charlois at the Nice Observatory on 8 January 1894. The carbonaceous C-type asteroid has a rotation period of 13.7 hours. It was named "Fiducia", the Latin word for confidence.
