= Auguste Charlois =

French astronomer

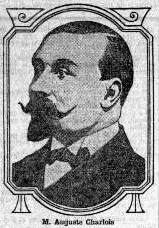
- Born: November 26, 1864; La Cadière-d'Azur
- Died: March 26, 1910 (aged 45)
- Occupation: Astronomer
- Awards: Prix Jules Janssen; Valz Prize

Minor planets discovered: 99
see § List of discovered minor planets

Auguste Honoré Charlois (French pronunciation: [oɡyst ɔnɔʁe ʃaʁlwa]; November 26, 1864 – March 26, 1910) was a French astronomer who discovered 99 asteroids while working at the Nice Observatory in southeastern France.

== Asteroid discovery ==
His first discovery was the asteroid 267 Tirza in 1887. He photographed 433 Eros on the very night of its discovery by Gustav Witt, but was not able to act quickly enough before Witt announced his find.

Although he started searching for asteroids in the era of visual detection, by 1891 Max Wolf had pioneered the use of astrophotography to drastically speed up the rate of detection of asteroids. Both Wolf and Charlois separately discovered far more asteroids than would have been feasible by visual detection. In 1899, Charlois received the Prix Jules Janssen, the highest award of the Société astronomique de France, the French astronomical society. He was awarded the Valz Prize by the French Academy of Sciences in 1889 for his work on calculating asteroid orbits.

== Murder ==
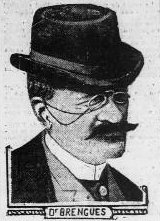
Gabriel Brenguès

At the age of 45, he was murdered by Gabriel Brengues, the brother of his first wife, Jeanne Charlois and husband to the sister (Therese) of his second wife, Marie Brengues, over an inheritance by the death of Jeanne (née Brengues). The man was found guilty and given a life sentence of hard labor in New Caledonia.

== Memorial ==
The asteroid 1510 Charlois, discovered by André Patry at Nice Observatory in 1939, was named in his honour.

== List of discovered minor planets ==
267 Tirza	May 27, 1887
272 Antonia	February 4, 1888
277 Elvira	May 3, 1888
282 Clorinde	January 28, 1889
283 Emma	February 8, 1889
284 Amalia	May 29, 1889
285 Regina	August 3, 1889
289 Nenetta	March 10, 1890
293 Brasilia	May 20, 1890
294 Felicia	July 15, 1890
296 Phaëtusa	August 19, 1890
297 Caecilia	September 9, 1890
298 Baptistina	September 9, 1890
300 Geraldina	October 3, 1890
302 Clarissa	November 14, 1890
305 Gordonia	February 16, 1891
307 Nike	March 5, 1891
310 Margarita	May 16, 1891
311 Claudia	June 11, 1891
312 Pierretta	August 28, 1891

314 Rosalia	September 1, 1891
316 Goberta	September 8, 1891
317 Roxane	September 11, 1891
318 Magdalena	September 24, 1891
319 Leona	October 8, 1891
327 Columbia	March 22, 1892
331 Etheridgea	April 1, 1892
336 Lacadiera	September 19, 1892
337 Devosa	September 22, 1892
338 Budrosa	September 25, 1892
344 Desiderata	November 15, 1892
345 Tercidina	November 23, 1892
346 Hermentaria	November 25, 1892
347 Pariana	November 28, 1892
348 May	November 28, 1892
349 Dembowska	December 9, 1892
350 Ornamenta	December 14, 1892
354 Eleonora	January 17, 1893
355 Gabriella	January 20, 1893
356 Liguria	January 21, 1893

357 Ninina	February 11, 1893
358 Apollonia	March 8, 1893
359 Georgia	March 10, 1893
360 Carlova	March 11, 1893
361 Bononia	March 11, 1893
362 Havnia	March 12, 1893
363 Padua	March 17, 1893
364 Isara	March 19, 1893
365 Corduba	March 21, 1893
366 Vincentina	March 21, 1893
367 Amicitia	May 19, 1893
368 Haidea	May 19, 1893
370 Modestia	July 14, 1893
371 Bohemia	July 16, 1893
372 Palma	August 19, 1893
373 Melusina	September 15, 1893
374 Burgundia	September 18, 1893
375 Ursula	September 18, 1893
376 Geometria	September 18, 1893
377 Campania	September 20, 1893

378 Holmia	December 6, 1893
379 Huenna	January 8, 1894
380 Fiducia	January 8, 1894
381 Myrrha	January 10, 1894
382 Dodona	January 29, 1894
383 Janina	January 29, 1894
388 Charybdis	March 7, 1894
389 Industria	March 8, 1894
395 Delia	November 30, 1894
396 Aeolia	December 1, 1894
397 Vienna	December 19, 1894
398 Admete	December 28, 1894
400 Ducrosa	March 15, 1895
402 Chloë	March 21, 1895
403 Cyane	May 18, 1895
404 Arsinoë	June 20, 1895
405 Thia	July 23, 1895
406 Erna	August 22, 1895
409 Aspasia	December 9, 1895
410 Chloris	January 7, 1896

411 Xanthe	January 7, 1896
414 Liriope	January 16, 1896
416 Vaticana	May 4, 1896
423 Diotima	December 7, 1896
424 Gratia	December 31, 1896
425 Cornelia	December 28, 1896
426 Hippo	August 25, 1897
427 Galene	August 27, 1897
429 Lotis	November 23, 1897
430 Hybris	December 18, 1897
431 Nephele	December 18, 1897
432 Pythia	December 18, 1897
437 Rhodia	July 16, 1898
438 Zeuxo	November 8, 1898
441 Bathilde	December 8, 1898
451 Patientia	December 4, 1899
453 Tea	February 22, 1900
498 Tokio	December 2, 1902
537 Pauly	July 7, 1904
