= 318 Magdalena =

Asteroid

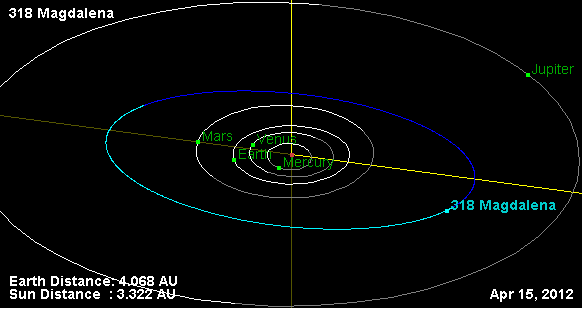
- Orbital diagram

Discovery
- Discovered by: Auguste Charlois
- Discovery date: 24 September 1891

Designations
- Pronunciation: /mæɡdəˈliːnə/
- Named after: Possibly Mary Magdalene
- Minor planet category: Main belt

Orbital characteristics
- Epoch 31 July 2016 (JD 2457600.5)
- Uncertainty parameter 0
- Observation arc: 124.56 yr (45496 d)
- Aphelion: 3.46477 AU (518.322 Gm)
- Perihelion: 2.92120 AU (437.005 Gm)
- Semi-major axis: 3.19298 AU (477.663 Gm)
- Eccentricity: 0.085119
- Orbital period (sidereal): 5.71 yr (2084.0 d)
- Mean anomaly: 158.522°
- Mean motion: 0° 10^{m} 21.886^{s} / day
- Inclination: 10.6573°
- Longitude of ascending node: 161.509°
- Argument of perihelion: 296.737°

Physical characteristics
- Dimensions: 85 km
- Synodic rotation period: 42.49 h (1.770 d)
- Absolute magnitude (H): 9.4

318 Magdalena is a main belt asteroid orbiting the Sun. It was discovered by French astronomer Auguste Charlois on 24 September 1891 in Nice. It may be named for Mary Magdalene, who in legend travelled to Southern Gaul and is the patron saint of Provence.

This asteroid is orbiting the Sun at a distance of 3.19 AU with a low eccentricity of 0.085 and an orbital period of 5.71 years. The orbital period is inclined at an angle of 10.7° to the plane of the ecliptic. It is spinning with a rotation period of 42.49 hours.

Measurements made with the IRAS observatory give a diameter of 106.08±0.25 km and a geometric albedo of 0.03±0.01. By comparison, the MIPS photometer on the Spitzer Space Telescope gives a diameter of 105.32±11.11 km and a geometric albedo of 0.03 ± 0.01.

On April 15, 2005, UT Magdalena occulted a 10.7 mag star in the constellation Scutum for observers along a path across Australia.

Alternative rock group The Pixies named one of their songs after the asteroid on their album Indie Cindy.
