= 314 Rosalia =

Main belt asteroid

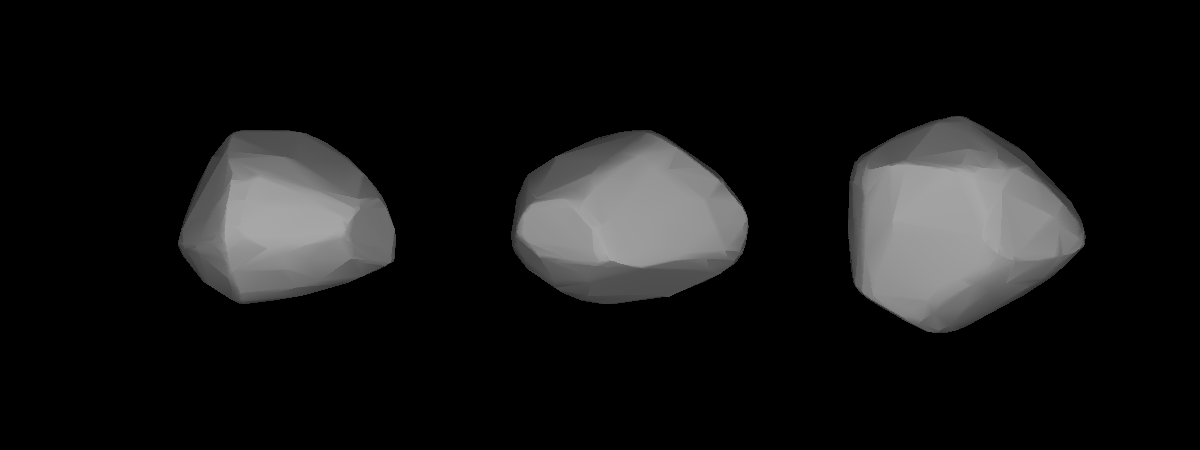
- Lightcurve-based 3D model of 314 Rosalia

Discovery
- Discovered by: Auguste Charlois
- Discovery date: 1 September 1891

Designations
- Pronunciation: /roʊˈzeɪliə, -ɑːliə/
- Minor planet category: Main belt

Orbital characteristics
- Epoch 31 July 2016 (JD 2457600.5)
- Uncertainty parameter 0
- Observation arc: 124.62 yr (45517 d)
- Aphelion: 3.71009 AU (555.022 Gm)
- Perihelion: 2.59640 AU (388.416 Gm)
- Semi-major axis: 3.15325 AU (471.719 Gm)
- Eccentricity: 0.17659
- Orbital period (sidereal): 5.60 yr (2045.2 d)
- Mean anomaly: 116.710°
- Mean motion: 0° 10^{m} 33.679^{s} / day
- Inclination: 12.5603°
- Longitude of ascending node: 170.314°
- Argument of perihelion: 190.369°

Physical characteristics
- Dimensions: 59.65±2.2 km
- Synodic rotation period: 20.43 h (0.851 d)
- Geometric albedo: 0.0787±0.006
- Absolute magnitude (H): 10.0

314 Rosalia is a large Main belt asteroid. It was discovered by Auguste Charlois on 1 September 1891 in Nice.

Photometric observations of this asteroid collected during 2006 show a rotation period of 20.43 ± 0.02 hours with a brightness variation of 0.21 ± 0.02 magnitude.
