= 365 Corduba =

Very large asteroid in the main belt of asteroids

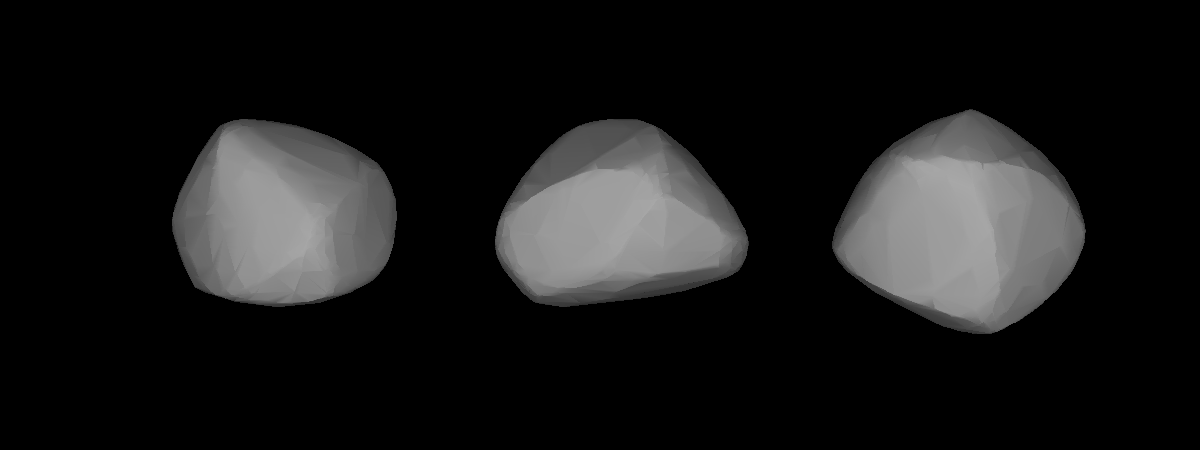
- Lightcurve-base 3D-model of 365 Corduba.

Discovery
- Discovered by: Auguste Charlois
- Discovery date: 21 March 1893

Designations
- Pronunciation: /ˈkɔːrdjʊbə/
- Named after: Possibly Córdoba, Spain
- Alternative designations: 1893 V
- Minor planet category: Main belt

Orbital characteristics
- Epoch 31 July 2016 (JD 2457600.5)
- Uncertainty parameter 0
- Observation arc: 117.96 yr (43084 d)
- Aphelion: 3.2417 AU (484.95 Gm)
- Perihelion: 2.36078 AU (353.168 Gm)
- Semi-major axis: 2.80122 AU (419.057 Gm)
- Eccentricity: 0.15723
- Orbital period (sidereal): 4.69 yr (1712.5 d)
- Mean anomaly: 233.78°
- Mean motion: 0° 12^{m} 36.792^{s} / day
- Inclination: 12.792°
- Longitude of ascending node: 185.196°
- Argument of perihelion: 216.45°

Physical characteristics
- Dimensions: 104.51 ± 2.42 km (composite estimate); 105.92±3.0 km
- Mass: (7.6±3.3)×10^{17} kg (Note: Calculated from its standard gravitational parameter GM = 0.051±0.022 km^{3}/s^{2}.)
- Mean density: 2.24 g/cm^{3} (Note: Assuming a diameter of 86.8 km.)
- Synodic rotation period: 12.705 h (0.5294 d)
- Geometric albedo: 0.0335±0.002
- Spectral type: C
- Absolute magnitude (H): 9.2

365 Corduba is a very large main-belt asteroid that was discovered by the French astronomer Auguste Charlois on 21 March 1893 from Nice. It is classified as a C-type asteroid and is probably composed of carbonaceous material.

Photometric observations of this asteroid at the Palmer Divide Observatory in Colorado Springs, Colorado, during 2007 gave a light curve with a period of 6.551 ± 0.002 hours and a brightness variation of 0.05 in magnitude. This differs somewhat from a 2004 study that gave a period of 6.354 hours, but this difference may be explained by the small magnitude variation which tends to increase the randomizing effect of noise in the data.
