= 403 Cyane =

Main-belt asteroid

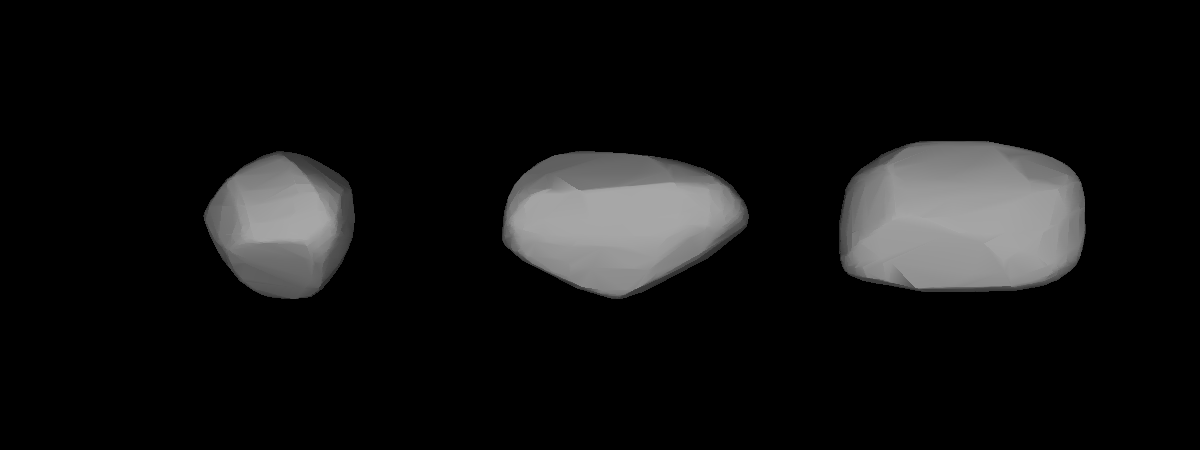
- A three-dimensional model of 403 Cyane based on its light curve

Discovery
- Discovered by: Auguste Charlois
- Discovery date: 18 May 1895

Designations
- Pronunciation: /ˈsaɪəniː/
- Named after: Cyane
- Alternative designations: 1895 BX
- Minor planet category: Main belt
- Adjectives: Cyanean /saɪˈeɪniːən/, /saɪəˈniːən/

Orbital characteristics
- Epoch 31 July 2016 (JD 2457600.5)
- Uncertainty parameter 0
- Observation arc: 120.89 yr (44155 d)
- Aphelion: 3.08158 AU (460.998 Gm)
- Perihelion: 2.53799 AU (379.678 Gm)
- Semi-major axis: 2.80979 AU (420.339 Gm)
- Eccentricity: 0.096731
- Orbital period (sidereal): 4.71 yr (1720.3 d)
- Mean anomaly: 350.231°
- Mean motion: 0° 12^{m} 33.35^{s} / day
- Inclination: 9.14883°
- Longitude of ascending node: 244.411°
- Argument of perihelion: 255.602°

Physical characteristics
- Dimensions: 49.49±1.1 km
- Synodic rotation period: 12.283 h (0.5118 d)
- Geometric albedo: 0.1653±0.007
- Absolute magnitude (H): 9.0

403 Cyane is a typical Main belt asteroid.

It was discovered by Auguste Charlois on 18 May 1895 in Nice.
