= 424 Gratia =

Main-belt asteroid

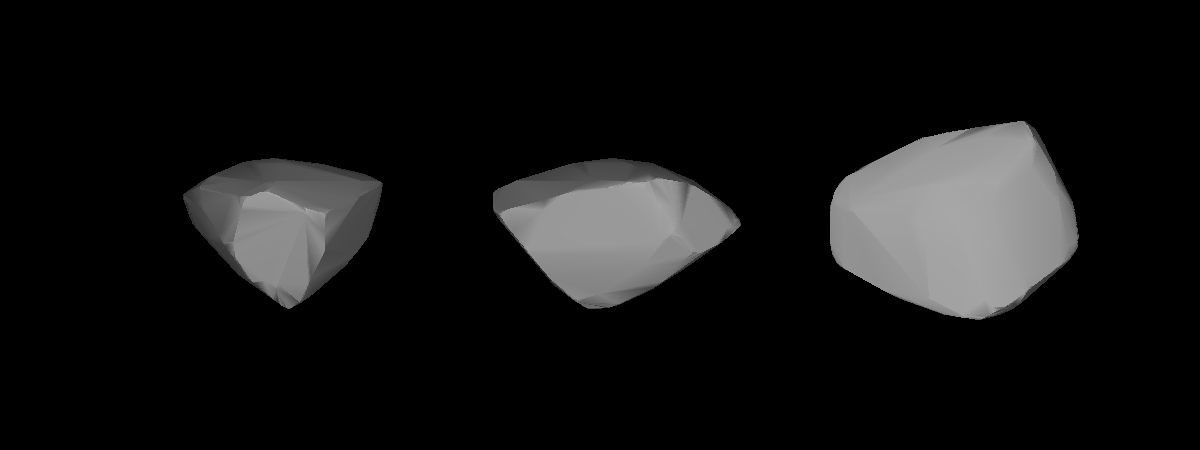
- Lightcurve-base 3D-model of 424 Gratia./\

Discovery
- Discovered by: Auguste Charlois
- Discovery date: 31 December 1896

Designations
- Pronunciation: /ˈɡreɪʃ(i)ə/
- Named after: The Charites
- Alternative designations: 1896 DF
- Minor planet category: Main belt

Orbital characteristics
- Epoch 31 July 2016 (JD 2457600.5)
- Uncertainty parameter 0
- Observation arc: 117.66 yr (42975 d)
- Aphelion: 3.07379 AU (459.832 Gm)
- Perihelion: 2.47464 AU (370.201 Gm)
- Semi-major axis: 2.77421 AU (415.016 Gm)
- Eccentricity: 0.10798
- Orbital period (sidereal): 4.62 yr (1687.8 d)
- Mean anomaly: 350.256°
- Mean motion: 0° 12^{m} 47.887^{s} / day
- Inclination: 8.20911°
- Longitude of ascending node: 99.2454°
- Argument of perihelion: 331.822°

Physical characteristics
- Dimensions: 102.565±0.644 km
- Mass: (5.5±2.7)×10^{17} kg (Note: Calculated from its standard gravitational parameter GM = 0.037±0.018 km^{3}/s^{2}.)
- Mean density: 0.99 g/cm^{3} (Note: Assuming a diameter of 103 km.)
- Synodic rotation period: 19.47 h (0.811 d)
- Geometric albedo: 0.0279±0.001
- Absolute magnitude (H): 9.5

424 Gratia is a large Main belt asteroid.

It was discovered by Auguste Charlois on 31 December 1896 in Nice. It was named after the Gratiae from Greek mythology.
