= 414 Liriope =

Main-belt asteroid

Discovery
- Discovered by: Auguste Charlois
- Discovery date: 16 January 1896

Designations
- Pronunciation: /lɪˈraɪəpiː/
- Named after: Līriopē
- Alternative designations: 1896 CN
- Minor planet category: Main belt

Orbital characteristics
- Epoch 31 July 2016 (JD 2457600.5)
- Uncertainty parameter 0
- Observation arc: 108.45 yr (39611 d)
- Aphelion: 3.75820 AU (562.219 Gm)
- Perihelion: 3.25061 AU (486.284 Gm)
- Semi-major axis: 3.50440 AU (524.251 Gm)
- Eccentricity: 0.072422
- Orbital period (sidereal): 6.56 yr (2396.2 d)
- Mean anomaly: 179.805°
- Mean motion: 0° 9^{m} 0.86^{s} / day
- Inclination: 9.55837°
- Longitude of ascending node: 110.586°
- Argument of perihelion: 319.612°

Physical characteristics
- Dimensions: 69.89±2.9 km
- Synodic rotation period: 7.353 h (0.3064 d)
- Geometric albedo: 0.0579±0.005
- Spectral type: C
- Absolute magnitude (H): 9.49

414 Liriope is a large Main belt asteroid. It is classified as a C-type asteroid and is probably composed of carbonaceous material.

It was discovered by Auguste Charlois on 16 January 1896 in Nice.
