= 409 Aspasia =

Main-belt asteroid

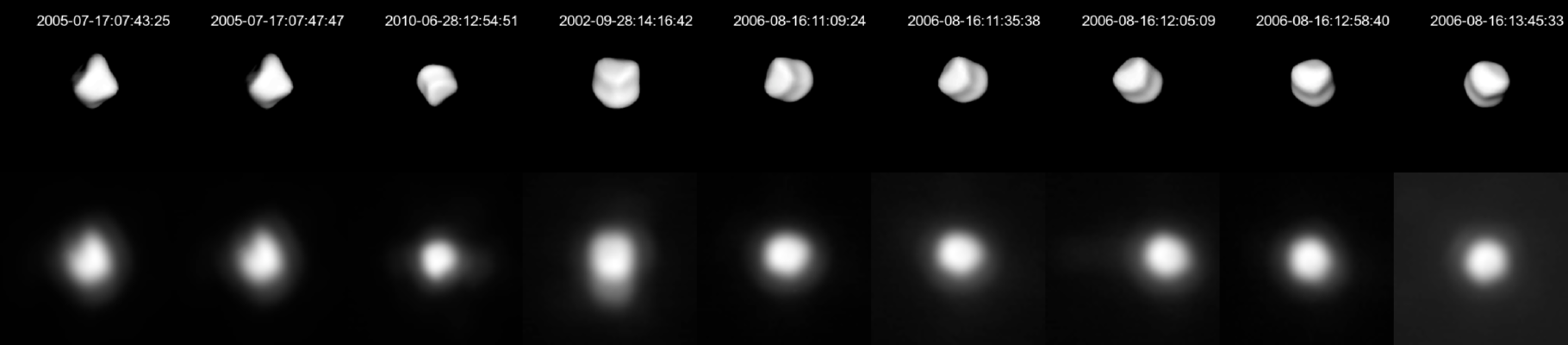
- Lightcurve-base 3D-model of Aspasia on the top with an image of the asteroid on the bottom.

Discovery
- Discovered by: Auguste Charlois
- Discovery date: 9 December 1895

Designations
- Pronunciation: /æˈspeɪʒ(i)ə/
- Named after: Aspasia
- Alternative designations: 1895 CE
- Minor planet category: Main belt
- Adjectives: Aspasian

Orbital characteristics
- Epoch 31 July 2016 (JD 2457600.5)
- Uncertainty parameter 0
- Observation arc: 120.33 yr (43952 d)
- Aphelion: 2.7640 AU (413.49 Gm)
- Perihelion: 2.3865 AU (357.02 Gm)
- Semi-major axis: 2.5752 AU (385.24 Gm)
- Eccentricity: 0.073284
- Orbital period (sidereal): 4.13 yr (1509.5 d)
- Mean anomaly: 260.362°
- Mean motion: 0° 14^{m} 18.564^{s} / day
- Inclination: 11.262°
- Longitude of ascending node: 242.19°
- Argument of perihelion: 353.72°

Physical characteristics
- Mean diameter: 164±3 km (AO)
- Mass: (4.08±0.19)×10^{18} kg (Note: Calculated from its standard gravitational parameter GM = 0.272±0.013 km^{3}/s^{2}.)
- Mean density: 1.76±0.13 g/cm^{3}
- Synodic rotation period: 9.02145 h (0.375894 d)
- Pole ecliptic longitude: 4° ± 2°
- Pole ecliptic latitude: 30° ± 2°
- Geometric albedo: 0.054±0.005
- Absolute magnitude (H): 7.65

409 Aspasia is a large main-belt asteroid that was discovered by French astronomer Auguste Charlois on 9 December 1895 in Nice. It is classified as a CX-type asteroid.

Photometric observations of this asteroid at the Palmer Divide Observatory in Colorado Springs, Colorado, during 2007–8 gave a light curve with a period of 9.021455 ± 0.000009 hours. This is consistent with previous results.
