= 361 Bononia =

Main-belt asteroid

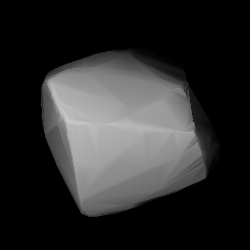
- Modelled shape of Bononia from its lightcurve

Discovery
- Discovered by: Auguste Charlois
- Discovery date: 11 March 1893

Designations
- Pronunciation: /bəˈnoʊniə/
- Named after: Bologna (Bonōnia)
- Alternative designations: 1893 P
- Minor planet category: Main belt (Hilda)
- Adjectives: Bononian

Orbital characteristics
- Epoch 31 July 2016 (JD 2457600.5)
- Uncertainty parameter 0
- Observation arc: 114.83 yr (41940 d)
- Aphelion: 4.80719 AU (719.145 Gm)
- Perihelion: 3.11281 AU (465.670 Gm)
- Semi-major axis: 3.96000 AU (592.408 Gm)
- Eccentricity: 0.21394
- Orbital period (sidereal): 7.88 yr (2878.3 d)
- Mean anomaly: 329.195°
- Mean motion: 0° 7^{m} 30.259^{s} / day
- Inclination: 12.6264°
- Longitude of ascending node: 18.8738°
- Argument of perihelion: 68.3637°

Physical characteristics
- Dimensions: 141.72±6.9 km
- Synodic rotation period: 13.83 h (0.576 d)
- Geometric albedo: 0.0453±0.005
- Spectral type: D
- Absolute magnitude (H): 8.22

361 Bononia /bəˈnoʊniə/ is a very large, resonant Hilda asteroid located in the outermost region of the asteroid belt. It is classified as a D-type asteroid and is probably composed of organic rich silicates, carbon and anhydrous silicates. It was discovered by Auguste Charlois on 11 March 1893, in Nice, and assigned the prov. designations A893 EF and 1893 P.
