= 431 Nephele =

Main-belt asteroid

Discovery
- Discovered by: Auguste Charlois
- Discovery date: 18 December 1897

Designations
- Pronunciation: /ˈnɛfəliː/
- Named after: Nephele
- Alternative designations: 1897 DN
- Minor planet category: Main belt (Themis)
- Adjectives: Nephelean /nɛfɪˈliːən/

Orbital characteristics
- Epoch 31 July 2016 (JD 2457600.5)
- Uncertainty parameter 0
- Observation arc: 113.52 yr (41462 d)
- Aphelion: 3.67837 AU (550.276 Gm)
- Perihelion: 2.61178 AU (390.717 Gm)
- Semi-major axis: 3.14507 AU (470.496 Gm)
- Eccentricity: 0.16957
- Orbital period (sidereal): 5.58 yr (2037.3 d)
- Mean anomaly: 230.611°
- Mean motion: 0° 10^{m} 36.152^{s} / day
- Inclination: 1.82752°
- Longitude of ascending node: 117.229°
- Argument of perihelion: 216.161°

Physical characteristics
- Mean diameter: 101.900±0.988 km 94.58±1.03 km
- Mass: (7.44 ± 4.14/2.39)×10^{17} kg (7.2±2.7)×10^{17} kg (Note: Calculated from its standard gravitational parameter GM = 0.048±0.018 km^{3}/s^{2}.)
- Mean density: 1.678 ± 0.935/0.54 g/cm^{3} 1.29 g/cm^{3} (Note: Assuming a diameter of 102 km.)
- Synodic rotation period: 18.821 h (0.7842 d)
- Geometric albedo: 0.055±0.005
- Spectral type: C
- Absolute magnitude (H): 9.12

431 Nephele is a large Themistian asteroid, approximately 102 kilometers in diameter. It is spectral C-type and is probably composed of carbonaceous material.

It was discovered by Auguste Charlois on 18 December 1897 in Nice.
