= 282 Clorinde =

Main-belt asteroid

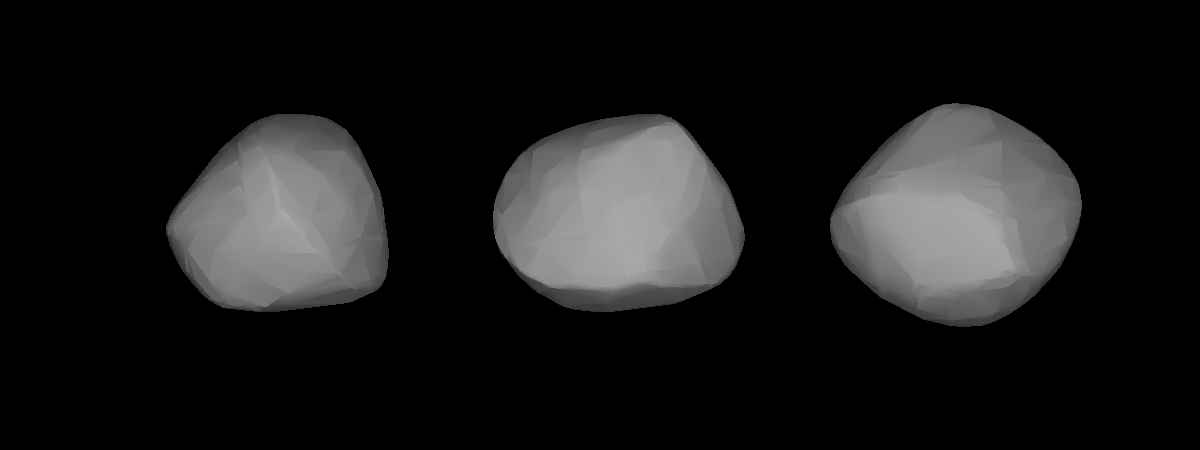
- Lightcurve-based 3D model of 282 Clorinde

Discovery
- Discovered by: Auguste Charlois
- Discovery date: 28 January 1889

Designations
- Pronunciation: /klɒˈrɪnd(ə)/
- Named after: Clorinda
- Alternative designations: A889 BA, 1955 RQ
- Minor planet category: Main belt

Orbital characteristics
- Epoch 31 July 2016 (JD 2457600.5)
- Uncertainty parameter 0
- Observation arc: 117.48 yr (42911 d)
- Aphelion: 2.52817 AU (378.209 Gm)
- Perihelion: 2.15070 AU (321.740 Gm)
- Semi-major axis: 2.33944 AU (349.975 Gm)
- Eccentricity: 0.080677
- Orbital period (sidereal): 3.58 yr (1307.0 d)
- Mean anomaly: 277.334°
- Mean motion: 0° 16^{m} 31.606^{s} / day
- Inclination: 9.03297°
- Longitude of ascending node: 144.972°
- Argument of perihelion: 295.960°

Physical characteristics
- Dimensions: 39.03±1.0 km
- Mass: (4.2±1.5)×10^{17} kg (Note: Calculated from its standard gravitational parameter GM = 0.028±0.010 km^{3}/s^{2}.)
- Mean density: 13.43 g/cm^{3}
- Synodic rotation period: 6.42 h (0.268 d)
- Geometric albedo: 0.0502±0.003
- Temperature: unknown
- Absolute magnitude (H): 10.91

282 Clorinde is a typical Main belt asteroid. It was discovered by Auguste Charlois on 28 January 1889 in Nice. It was named after Clorinda, the heroine of Torquato Tasso's poem Jerusalem Delivered.

Photometric measurements during 2020–2021 was used to produce a light curve, which shows a rotation period of 49.353±0.004 h with a brightness variation of 0.26 in magnitude. This differs substantially from previous studies.
