= 344 Desiderata =

Main-belt asteroid

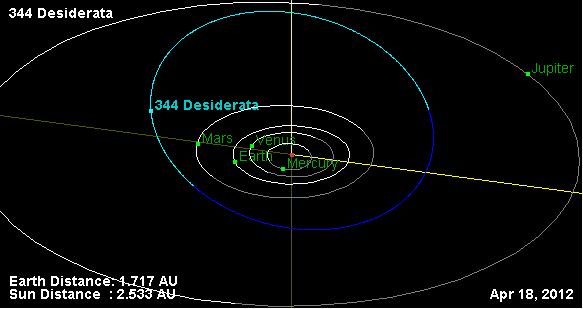
- Orbital diagram

Discovery
- Discovered by: Auguste Charlois
- Discovery date: 15 November 1892

Designations
- Pronunciation: /dɪˌsɪdəˈreɪtə/
- Named after: Désirée Clary
- Alternative designations: 1892 M
- Minor planet category: Main belt

Orbital characteristics
- Epoch 31 July 2016 (JD 2457600.5)
- Uncertainty parameter 0
- Observation arc: 123.40 yr (45073 d)
- Aphelion: 3.41189 AU (510.411 Gm)
- Perihelion: 1.78384 AU (266.859 Gm)
- Semi-major axis: 2.59786 AU (388.634 Gm)
- Eccentricity: 0.31334
- Orbital period (sidereal): 4.19 yr (1529.4 d)
- Mean anomaly: 301.200°
- Mean motion: 0° 14^{m} 7.39^{s} / day
- Inclination: 18.3442°
- Longitude of ascending node: 48.0488°
- Argument of perihelion: 237.424°

Physical characteristics
- Mean diameter: 129.20 ± 3.37 km (composite estimate); 124.181±2.516 km
- Mass: (1.39±0.48)×10^{18} kg (composite estimate) (1.693 ± 0.463/0.498)×10^{18} kg (2.94±0.46)×10^{18} kg (Note: Calculated from its standard gravitational parameter GM = 0.196±0.031 km^{3}/s^{2}.)
- Mean density: 1.22±0.43 g/cm^{3} 1.688 ± 0.462/0.496 g/cm^{3} 2.92 g/cm^{3} (Note: Assuming a diameter of 124 km.)
- Synodic rotation period: 10.747 h (0.4478 d)
- Geometric albedo: 0.067±0.007
- Spectral type: C
- Absolute magnitude (H): 8.28

344 Desiderata is a very large main-belt asteroid. It is classified as a C-type asteroid and is probably composed of carbonaceous material.

It was discovered by Auguste Charlois on 15 November 1892, in Nice.
