= 358 Apollonia =

Main-belt asteroid

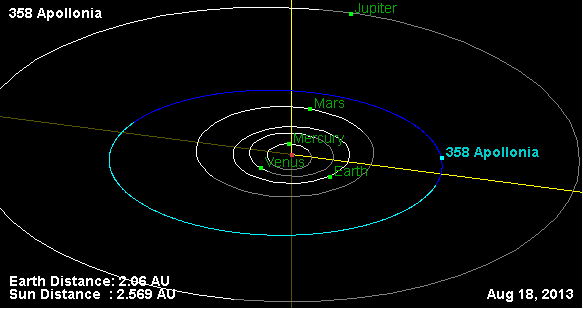
- Orbital diagram

Discovery
- Discovered by: Auguste Charlois
- Discovery date: 8 March 1893

Designations
- Pronunciation: /æpəˈloʊniə/
- Named after: Possibly Apollonia (Illyria)
- Alternative designations: 1893 K
- Minor planet category: Main belt

Orbital characteristics
- Epoch 31 July 2016 (JD 2457600.5)
- Uncertainty parameter 0
- Observation arc: 118.08 yr (43129 d)
- Aphelion: 3.31497 AU (495.912 Gm)
- Perihelion: 2.43597 AU (364.416 Gm)
- Semi-major axis: 2.87547 AU (430.164 Gm)
- Eccentricity: 0.15284
- Orbital period (sidereal): 4.88 yr (1781.0 d)
- Mean anomaly: 179.300°
- Mean motion: 0° 12^{m} 7.682^{s} / day
- Inclination: 3.55411°
- Longitude of ascending node: 172.161°
- Argument of perihelion: 253.343°

Physical characteristics
- Mean diameter: 89.11±1.78 km (composite estimate)
- Mass: (7.0±1.6)×10^{17} kg (Note: Calculated from its standard gravitational parameter GM = 0.047±0.011 km^{3}/s^{2}.)
- Mean density: 1.83 g/cm^{3} (Note: Assuming a diameter of 90.1 km.)
- Synodic rotation period: 50.6 h (2.11 d)
- Geometric albedo: 0.0506±0.003
- Absolute magnitude (H): 9.1

358 Apollonia is a large main belt asteroid. It was discovered by Auguste Charlois on 8 March 1893 in Nice.
