= 537 Pauly =

Main-belt asteroid

Discovery
- Discovered by: Auguste Charlois
- Discovery site: Nice
- Discovery date: 7 July 1904

Designations
- Pronunciation: /ˈpɔːli/
- Alternative designations: 1904 OG; 1930 GN; A913 EF; A904 NB
- Minor planet category: Main belt

Orbital characteristics
- Epoch 31 July 2016 (JD 2457600.5)
- Uncertainty parameter 0
- Observation arc: 124.13 yr (45337 d)
- Aphelion: 3.7884 AU (566.74 Gm)
- Perihelion: 2.3416 AU (350.30 Gm)
- Semi-major axis: 3.0650 AU (458.52 Gm)
- Eccentricity: 0.236025
- Orbital period (sidereal): 5.366 yr (1969.8 d)
- Mean anomaly: 296.893°
- Mean motion: 0° 10^{m} 57.936^{s} / day
- Inclination: 9.9215°
- Longitude of ascending node: 119.851°
- Argument of perihelion: 187.838°

Physical characteristics
- Mean diameter: 47+1 −2 km (pole solution 1); 46±2 km (pole solution 2)
- Synodic rotation period: 16.29601±0.00002 h (pole solution 1); 16.29597±0.00001 h (pole solution 2); 16.168 h (0.6737 d)
- Pole ecliptic longitude: 32° ± 3° or 214° ± 4°
- Pole ecliptic latitude: 43° ± 6° or 60° ± 9°
- Geometric albedo: 0.26+0.03 −0.02 (pole solution 1); 0.25+0.05 −0.02 (pole solution 2); 0.322±0.030
- Absolute magnitude (H): 8.78

537 Pauly is a minor planet and a main belt asteroid orbiting the Sun. It was discovered by Auguste Charlois on 7 July 1904 in Nice.

== Discovery ==
Pauly was discovered on 7 July 1904 by Charlois A. at Nice.

== Observations ==
The observation arc of Pauly began on 24 February 1902 and was last observed on 11 April 2026. Giving it a long observation arc of 124 years. In these 124 years, Pauly has been observed 7160 times.

== Orbit ==
Pauly is a main belt asteroid that orbits the Sun at a distance of 2.34–3.79 astronomical units (AU) with a semi-major axis or average orbital distance of 3.065 AU once every 5.37 years (for reference, Ceres's orbit is at 2.77 AU).

Pauly's orbit has a relatively high eccentricity of 0.236 and an inclination of 9.92° with respect to the ecliptic.

== Physical characteristics ==
Pauly has a diameter of approximately 40.732±0.845 km, its albedo is 0.322±0.030. Pauly rotates on its axis once every 16.168 hours.
