= 272 Antonia =

Main-belt asteroid

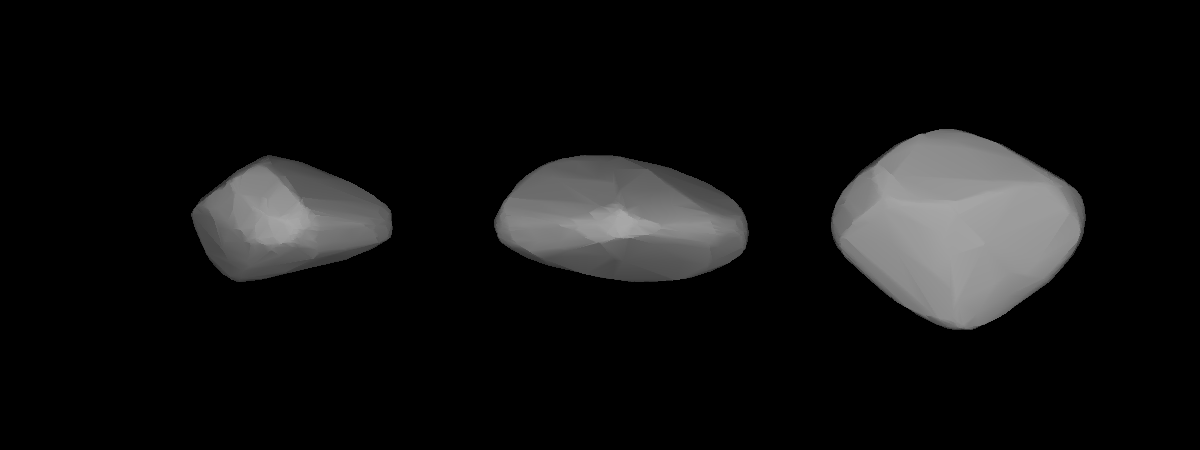
- A three-dimensional model of 272 Antonia based on its lightcurve

Discovery
- Discovered by: Auguste Charlois
- Discovery date: 4 February 1888

Designations
- Pronunciation: /ænˈtoʊniə/
- Alternative designations: A888 CA, 1944 FE
- Minor planet category: Main belt

Orbital characteristics
- Epoch 31 July 2016 (JD 2457600.5)
- Uncertainty parameter 0
- Observation arc: 97.35 yr (35557 d)
- Aphelion: 2.8529 AU (426.79 Gm)
- Perihelion: 2.70319 AU (404.391 Gm)
- Semi-major axis: 2.77805 AU (415.590 Gm)
- Eccentricity: 0.026945
- Orbital period (sidereal): 4.63 yr (1691.2 d)
- Mean anomaly: 307.768°
- Mean motion: 0° 12^{m} 46.296^{s} / day
- Inclination: 4.4396°
- Longitude of ascending node: 37.408°
- Argument of perihelion: 64.248°

Physical characteristics
- Dimensions: 25.35±1.4 km
- Synodic rotation period: 3.8548 h (0.16062 d)
- Geometric albedo: 0.1443±0.017
- Absolute magnitude (H): 10.7

272 Antonia is a main belt asteroid that was discovered by French astronomer Auguste Charlois on 4 February 1888 in Nice.

Photometric observations of this asteroid made during 2008 at the Organ Mesa Observatory in Las Cruces, New Mexico, gave a light curve with a short rotation period of 3.8548 ± 0.0001 hours and a brightness variation of 0.43 ± 0.04 in magnitude.
