= 397 Vienna =

Main-belt asteroid

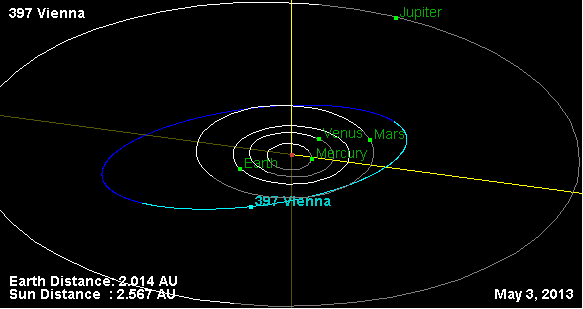
- Orbital diagram

Discovery
- Discovered by: Auguste Charlois
- Discovery date: 19 December 1894

Designations
- Pronunciation: /viˈɛnə/
- Named after: Vienna
- Alternative designations: 1894 BM
- Minor planet category: Main belt

Orbital characteristics
- Epoch 31 July 2016 (JD 2457600.5)
- Uncertainty parameter 0
- Observation arc: 117.45 yr (42,900 d)
- Aphelion: 3.28657 AU (491.664 Gm)
- Perihelion: 1.98686 AU (297.230 Gm)
- Semi-major axis: 2.63671 AU (394.446 Gm)
- Eccentricity: 0.24646
- Orbital period (sidereal): 4.28 yr (1,563.8 d)
- Mean anomaly: 202.358°
- Mean motion: 0° 13^{m} 48.731^{s} / day
- Inclination: 12.8534°
- Longitude of ascending node: 227.935°
- Argument of perihelion: 139.975°

Physical characteristics
- Dimensions: 49.032±1.055 km
- Synodic rotation period: 15.48 h (0.645 d)
- Geometric albedo: 0.1776±0.015
- Absolute magnitude (H): 9.31

397 Vienna is a typical Main belt asteroid. It was discovered by French astronomer Auguste Charlois on 19 December 1894 in Nice. It was most likely named after the city of Vienna, Austria. This object is orbiting the Sun at a distance of 2.64 AU with an orbital eccentricity (ovalness) of 0.246 and a period of 4.28 yr. The orbital plane is inclined at an angle of 12.85° to the ecliptic.

Photometric observations from multiple sites during 2017 were combined to produce an irregular light curve showing a rotation period of 15.461±0.001 h with a luminosity amplitude of 0.16±0.02 in magnitude. This result is consistent with previous measurements. The Tholen spectral type of this object is S and the SMASSII spectral type is K. Although the 'S' class suggests a stony composition, the latter class is consistent with carbonaceous chondrite meteorites. Infrared observations from NEOWISE indicate a diameter of 49 km.
