= 400 Ducrosa =

Main-belt asteroid

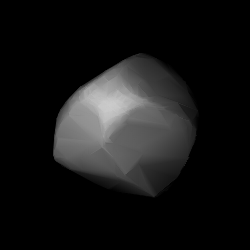
- Modelled shape of Ducrosa from its lightcurve

Discovery
- Discovered by: Auguste Charlois
- Discovery date: 15 March 1895

Designations
- Named after: J. Ducros
- Alternative designations: 1895 BU
- Minor planet category: Main belt

Orbital characteristics
- Epoch 31 July 2016 (JD 2457600.5)
- Uncertainty parameter 0
- Observation arc: 121.08 yr (44225 d)
- Aphelion: 3.49063 AU (522.191 Gm)
- Perihelion: 2.76117 AU (413.065 Gm)
- Semi-major axis: 3.12590 AU (467.628 Gm)
- Eccentricity: 0.11668
- Orbital period (sidereal): 5.527 yr (2,018.6 d)
- Average orbital speed: 16.84 km/s
- Mean anomaly: 294.184°
- Mean motion: 0° 10^{m} 42.013^{s} / day
- Inclination: 10.5354°
- Longitude of ascending node: 327.145°
- Argument of perihelion: 238.468°
- Earth MOID: 1.7762 AU (265.72 Gm)
- Jupiter MOID: 1.59886 AU (239.186 Gm)
- T_{Jupiter}: 3.178

Physical characteristics
- Dimensions: 33.66±1.6 km
- Synodic rotation period: 6.87 h (0.286 d); 6.87 ± 0.01 hours
- Geometric albedo: 0.1423±0.014
- Spectral type: B
- Absolute magnitude (H): 10.5

400 Ducrosa is a typical main belt asteroid. It was discovered by Auguste Charlois on 15 March 1895 in Nice, and named for It J. Ducros a mechanic at the Nice Observatory. This minor planet is orbiting the Sun at a distance of 3.126 AU with a period of 5.527 yr and an orbital eccentricity of 0.117. The orbital plane is inclined at an angle of 10.5° to the plane of the ecliptic.

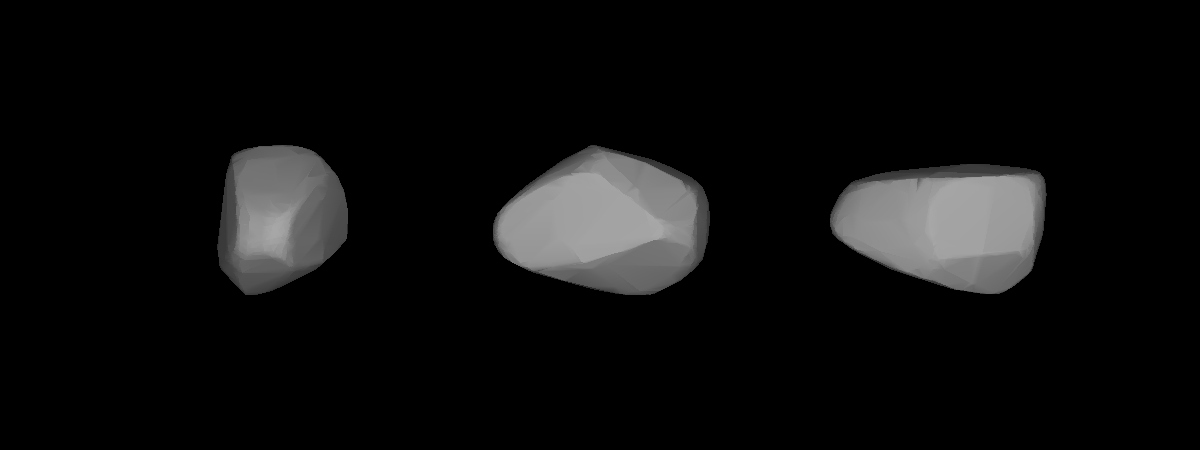
A three-dimensional model of 400 Ducrosa based on its light curve

This asteroid has a B-type taxonomy, indicating it has a relatively bright geometric albedo for a carbonaceous asteroid. It has an estimated diameter of 33.66±1.6 km. Photometric measurements of the asteroid made in 2005 at the Palmer Divide Observatory showed a light curve with a rotation period of 6.87±0.01 h and a brightness variation of 0.62±0.02 in magnitude. A 2020 study found a rotation period of 6.8678±0.0001 h with a variation of 0.57±0.03 magnitude.
