= 305 Gordonia =

Main-belt asteroid

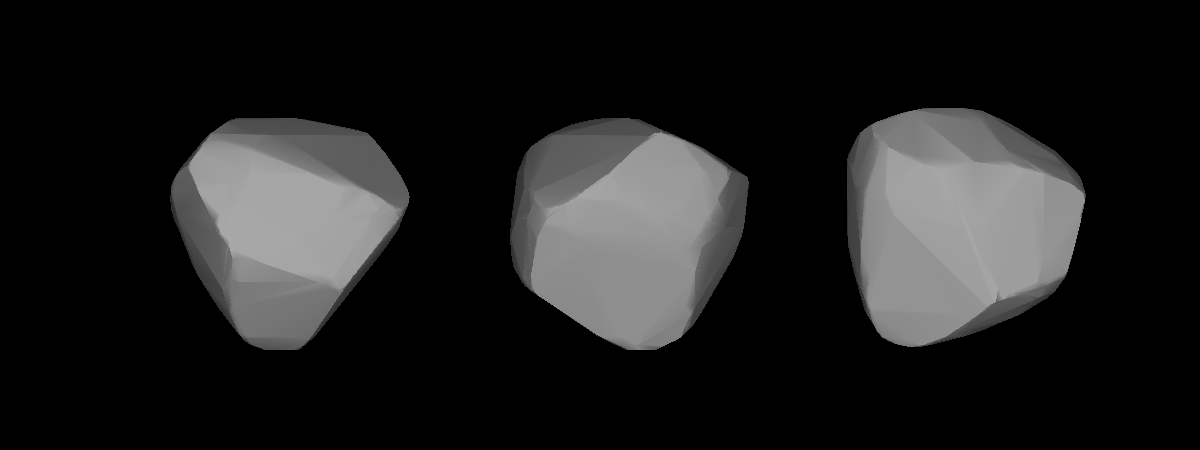
- Lightcurve-based 3D model of 305 Gordonia

Discovery
- Discovered by: Auguste Charlois
- Discovery date: 16 February 1891

Designations
- Pronunciation: /ɡɔːrˈdoʊniə/
- Alternative designations: A891 DA; 1938 SC_{1} 1970 SP_{1}
- Minor planet category: Main belt

Orbital characteristics
- Epoch 31 July 2016 (JD 2457600.5)
- Uncertainty parameter 0
- Observation arc: 123.90 yr (45255 d)
- Aphelion: 3.69187 AU (552.296 Gm)
- Perihelion: 2.49627 AU (373.437 Gm)
- Semi-major axis: 3.09407 AU (462.866 Gm)
- Eccentricity: 0.19321
- Orbital period (sidereal): 5.44 yr (1987.9 d)
- Mean anomaly: 43.0648°
- Mean motion: 0° 10^{m} 51.946^{s} / day
- Inclination: 4.44401°
- Longitude of ascending node: 207.494°
- Argument of perihelion: 261.346°

Physical characteristics
- Dimensions: 49.17±1.5 km
- Mass: (3.3±1.3)×10^{17} kg (Note: Calculated from its standard gravitational parameter GM = 0.022±0.009 km^{3}/s^{2}.)
- Mean density: 5.87 g/cm^{3} (Note: Assuming a diameter of 47.7 km.)
- Synodic rotation period: 12.893 h (0.5372 d); 12.89 ± 0.01 hours
- Geometric albedo: 0.2269±0.014
- Absolute magnitude (H): 8.77

305 Gordonia is a fairly typical, although sizeable Main belt asteroid.

It was discovered by Auguste Charlois on 16 February 1891 in Nice and named after James Gordon Bennett Jr., his patron.

The light curve of 305 Gordonia shows a periodicity of 12.89 ± 0.01 hours, during which time the brightness of the object varies by 0.17 ± 0.03 in magnitude.
