= 316 Goberta =

Main-belt asteroid

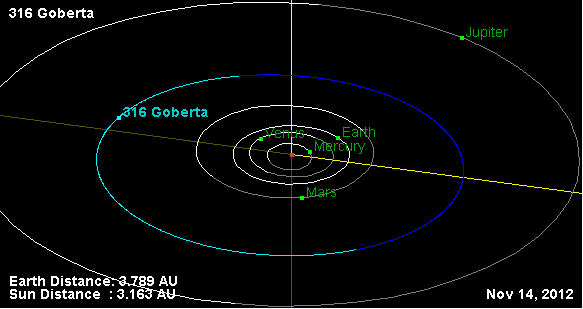
- Orbital diagram

Discovery
- Discovered by: Auguste Charlois
- Discovery date: 8 September 1891

Designations
- Minor planet category: Main belt (Themis)

Orbital characteristics
- Epoch 31 July 2016 (JD 2457600.5)
- Uncertainty parameter 0
- Observation arc: 124.27 yr (45391 d)
- Aphelion: 3.61240 AU (540.407 Gm)
- Perihelion: 2.7458 AU (410.77 Gm)
- Semi-major axis: 3.1791 AU (475.59 Gm)
- Eccentricity: 0.13629
- Orbital period (sidereal): 5.67 yr (2070.4 d)
- Mean anomaly: 315.703°
- Mean motion: 0° 10^{m} 25.968^{s} / day
- Inclination: 2.3390°
- Longitude of ascending node: 123.921°
- Argument of perihelion: 314.741°

Physical characteristics
- Mean diameter: 47.92±1.9 km
- Synodic rotation period: 8.605 h (0.3585 d); 8.605 ± 0.01 hours
- Geometric albedo: 0.0925±0.008
- Absolute magnitude (H): 10.1, 9.87

316 Goberta is a mid-sized Themistian asteroid that was discovered by French astronomer Auguste Charlois on 8 September 1891 in Nice.

The light curve of 316 Goberta shows a periodicity of 8.605 ± 0.01 hours, during which time the brightness of the object varies by 0.20 ± 0.05 in magnitude.
