= Ausonia =

Ausonia is the ancient Greek name for lower Italy, extended poetically to all Italy.

Ausonia may also refer to:

== Person ==
- Auson (king), son of Odysseus, from which Ausonia in Italy took its name

== Places ==
=== Argentina ===
- Ausonia, Argentina, a community in General San Martín Department, Córdoba

=== Italy ===
- Ausonia, Lazio, a comune in the province of Frosinone
- Ausona (ancient city), the ancient capital of the Ausones

=== Mars ===
- Ausonia Mensa, a geographical feature on the planet Mars
- Ausonia Montes, a mountain on Mars

== Ships ==
- German aircraft carrier I (1915), a German aircraft carrier
- RMS Ausonia, a 1921 British ocean liner
- SS Ausonia (1956), an Italian cruise ship
- MS Cruise Ausonia, a 2002 fast Ro-Pax jumbo ferry

== Sports ==
- U.S. Ausonia Spezia, an Italian football (soccer) team
- Ausonia Pro Gorla, football club

== Organizations ==
- Arbora & Ausonia, a Portuguese/Spanish company specialized in hygiene products
- Lega Sud Ausonia, an Italian political party

== Other uses ==
- Ausonia family, asteroids
  - 63 Ausonia, an asteroid

== See also ==
- Ausones
- Aurunci
- Ausenium
- Ausonius (310–395)
