= Rosamond =

Rosamond is a feminine given name. Notable people with the name include:

== People ==
- Rosamond Carr (1912–2006), American humanitarian and author
- Rosamund Clifford (before 1150 – c. 1176), English mistress of King Henry II
- Rosamond Young Chapin (1895–1984), American soprano singer
- J. Rosamond Johnson (1873–1954), Bahamian-American male composer and singer
- Rosamond Langbridge (1880–1964), Irish novelist, playwright and poet
- Rosamond Lehmann (1901–1990), British novelist
- Rosamond Marshall (1902–1957), American novelist
- Rosamond McKitterick (born 1949), British medieval historian
- R. J. Mitchell (author) (1902–1963), English author and archivist
- Rosamond Pinchot (1904–1938), American socialite and actress
- Rosamond Praeger (1867–1954), Irish artist, sculptor and writer
- Rosamond Royal, pen name of Jeanne Hines (1922–2014), American writer
- Rosamond Smith, a pen name of Joyce Carol Oates (born 1938), American author
- Rose Wilkinson (1885–1968), Canadian politician
- Rosamond "Roz" Young (1912 - 2005), American author, educator and historian

== Fictional characters ==
- a girl with four cats in the Nate the Great detective story series

== See also ==
- Babette Rosmond (1917–1997), American author
- Rosamund
