= Rosamond (disambiguation) =

Rosamond is a feminine given name.

Rosamond may also refer to:

== Places ==
- Rosamond, California, a census-designated place
- Rosamond, Illinois, an unincorporated community
- Rosamond Township, Christian County, Illinois
- Rosamond Hills, California, a mountain range
- Rosamond Lake, California
- Rosamond Skypark, California, a residential airpark and public-use airport

== Surname ==
- Bennett Rosamond (1833–1910), Canadian manufacturer and politician
- Christine Rosamond (194–1994), American painter and artist
- Frances A. Rosamond, Australian computer scientist

== Others ==
- Rosamond (Arne), an opera by Thomas Arne
- Rosamond (Clayton), an opera by Thomas Clayton, with a libretto by Joseph Addison
- Rosamond (1776 ship)

== See also ==
- Rosamund (disambiguation)
- Rosamunde (disambiguation)
