= Rosamund (disambiguation) =

Rosamund is a feminine given name.

Rosamund may also refer to:

- Rosamund (Tahlequah, Oklahoma), listed on the National Register of Historic Places listings in Cherokee County, Oklahoma
- Rosamund, an opera by Thomas Arne
- 540 Rosamunde, an asteroid
- Matthew Rosamund (1823–1866), British soldier and recipient of the Victoria Cross

== See also ==
- Rosamunde (disambiguation)
- Rosamond (disambiguation)
- Rosmonda, a tragicomedy by Carlo Goldoni
