= Rosamund =

Rosamund (/ˈrɒzəmənd, ˈroʊz-/, also spelled Rosamond and Rosamunde) is a feminine given name and can also be a family name (surname). Originally it combined the Germanic elements hros, meaning horse, and mund, meaning "protection". Later, it was influenced by the Latin phrases rosa munda, meaning "pure rose", and rosa mundi, meaning "rose of the world". "Rosamunda" is the Italian, "Rosamunde" is the German and "Rosemonde" the French form of the name.

People named Rosamund include:

- Rosamund (queen) (fl. sixth century), second wife of Alboin, King of the Germanic Lombards
- Rosamund Bartlett, American writer, scholar, translator and lecturer specializing in Russian literature
- Rosamund Clifford (before 1150–c. 1176), medieval beauty and longtime mistress of King Henry II
- Rosamund Greenwood (1907–1997), British actress
- Rosamund John (1913–1998), English actress
- Rosamund Kwan (born 1962), Chinese actress
- Rosamund Lupton (born 1964), British author
- Rosamunde Pilcher (1924–2019), British author
- Rosamund Pike (born 1979), English actress
- Rosamund Hanson (born 1989), English actress
- Rosamund Flora Shove (1878–1954), English botanist
- Rosamund Stanhope (1919–2005), British poet and teacher
- Rosamund Vallings, New Zealand doctor, specialist in chronic fatigue syndrome
- Rosamund Marriott Watson (1860–1911), English poet and critic who wrote under the pseudonym of Graham R. Tomson
