= Rose of the World =

Rose of the World may refer to:

- "Rose of the World", a song by Victor Herbert and Glen McDonough from the 1909 musical The Rose of Algeria
- Rose of the World (1918 film), 1918 American silent film
- Rose of the World (1925 film), 1925 American silent film
- Rose of the World (1991 book), 1991 Russian book by Daniil Andreyev
- Rose of the World, Russian organization based in Moscow
- Rosamund Clifford, known as "Rose of the World", mistress of King Henry II of England

== See also ==
- Rosamund (disambiguation), a female name and a family name
