= Whipple (spacecraft) =

Observatory for Oort Cloud objects

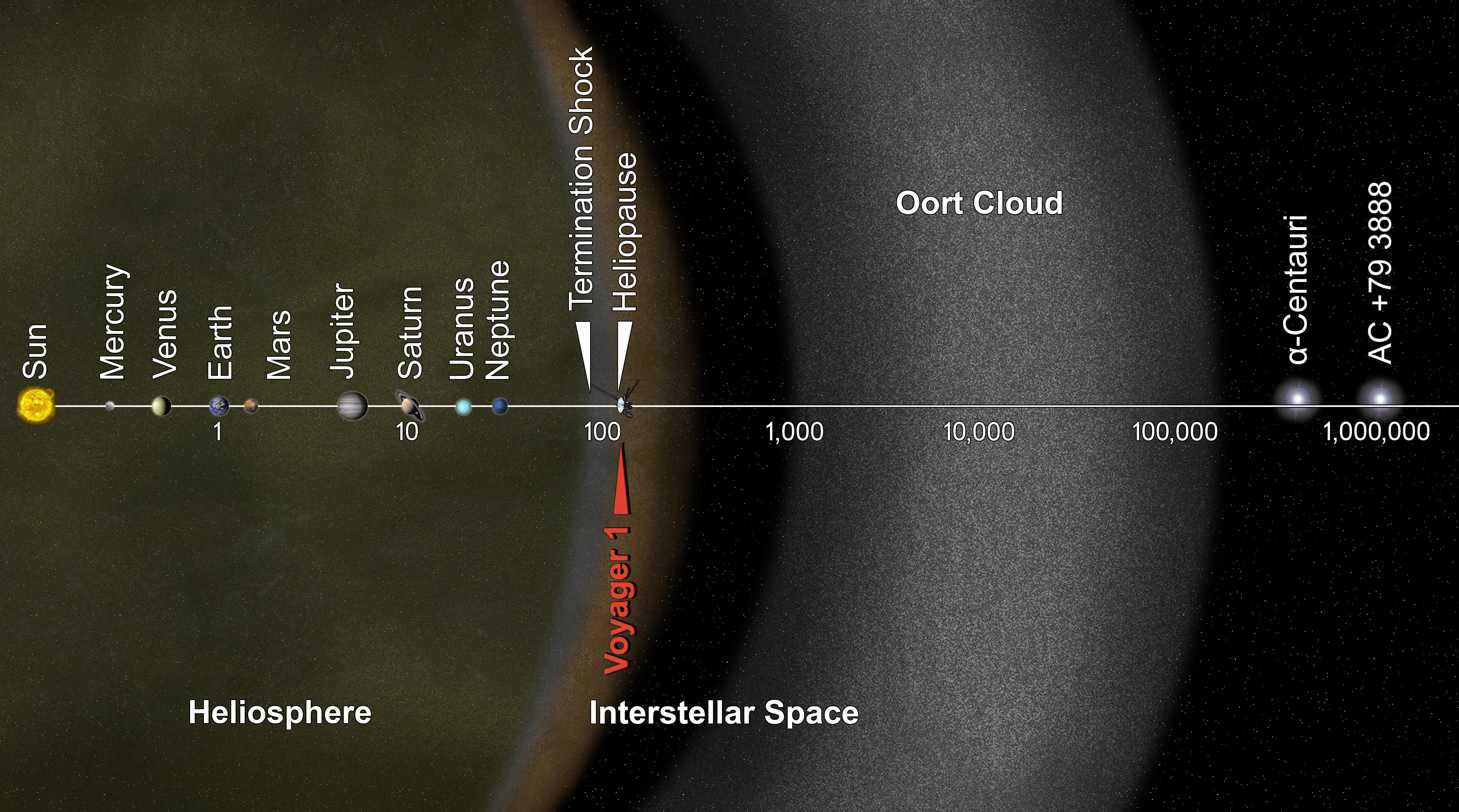
This is a logarithmic graph showing approximately the predicted range of the Oort cloud. The combination of small size and distance have left these objects beyond the capabilities of existing optical telescopes.

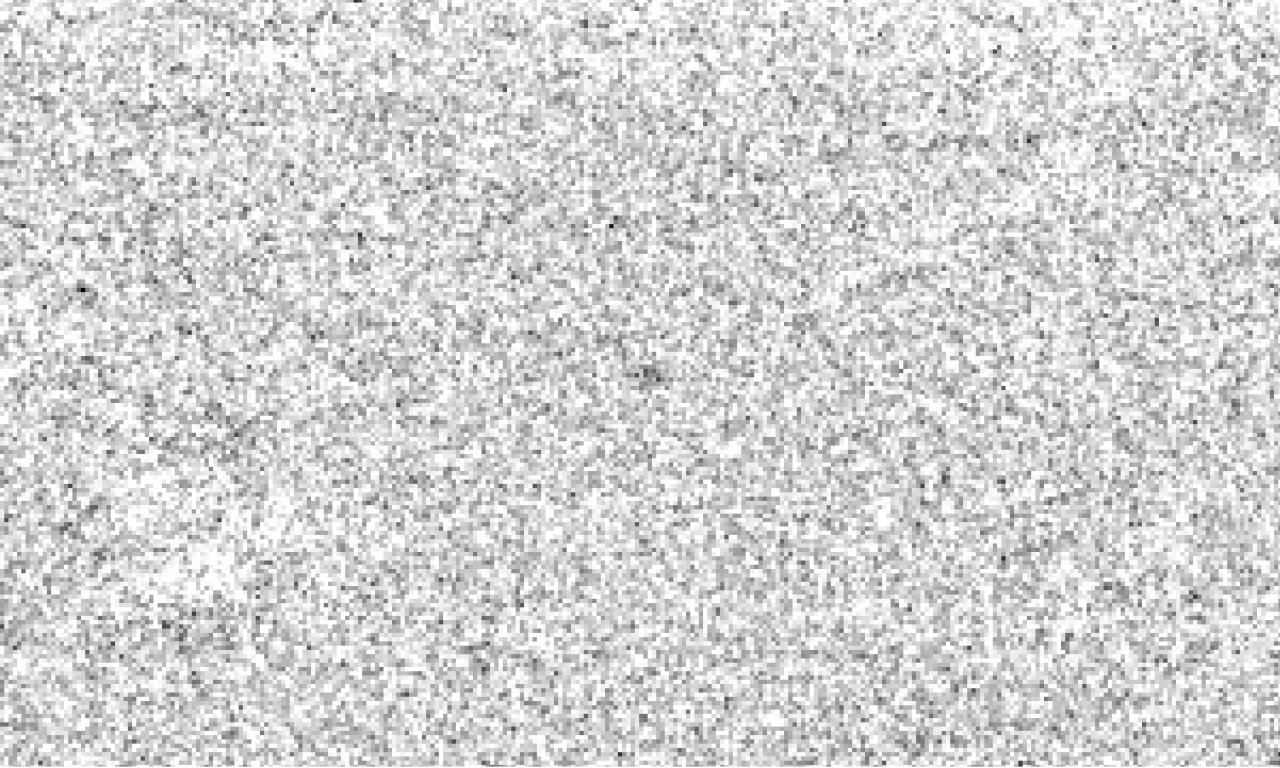
This observation of Halley's Comet in 2003 at 28 AU from the Sun illustrates the difficulty in observing objects as they grow more distant and faint. In this view the background stars have been removed by image processing. Whipple would try to detect comet sized objects out to 10000 AU.

Visualization of hypothesized Oort cloud

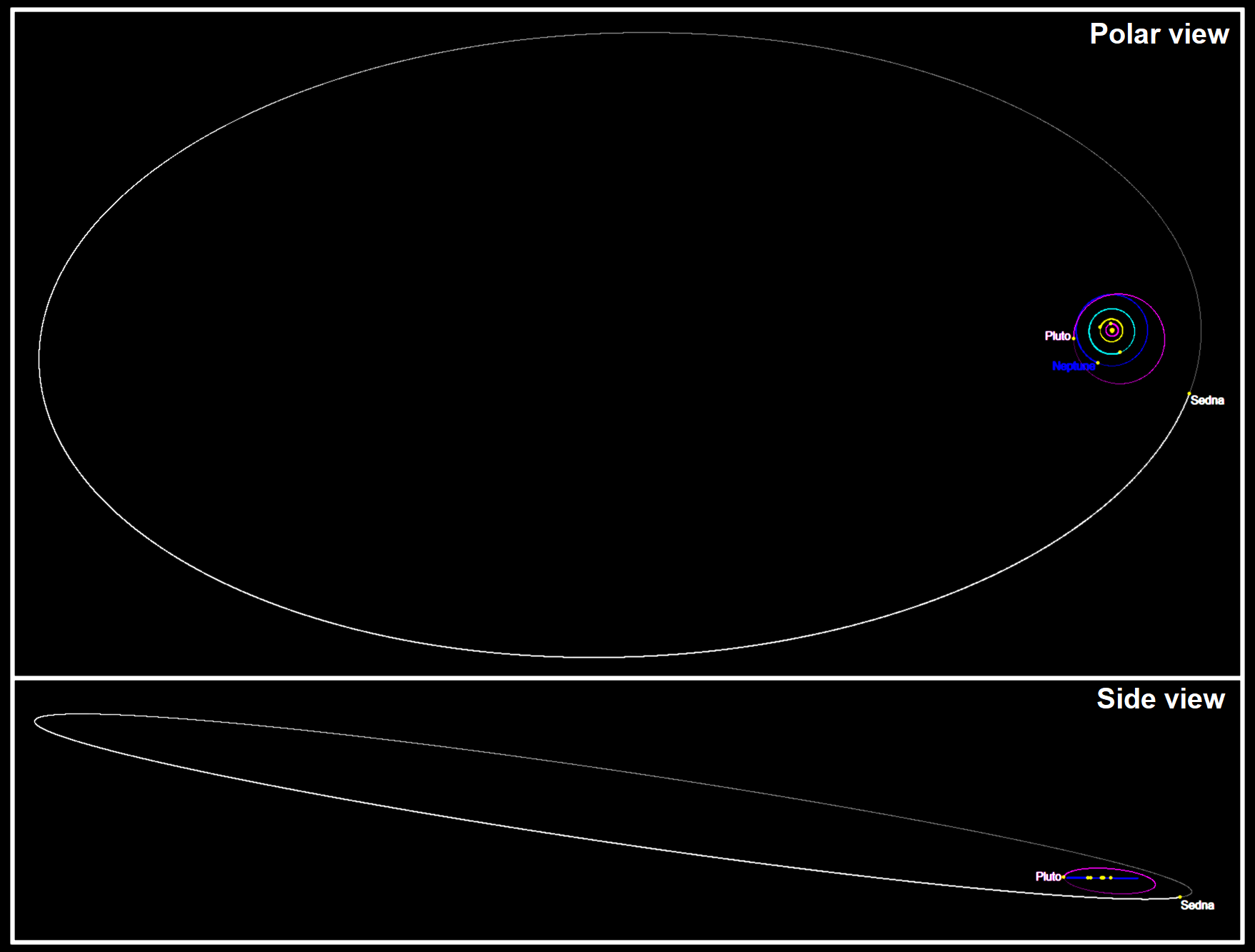
The orbit of Sedna (red) set against the orbits of outer Solar System objects (Pluto's orbit is purple).

Whipple was a proposed space observatory in the NASA Discovery Program. The observatory would try to search for objects in the Kuiper belt and the theorized Oort cloud by conducting blind occultation observations. Although the Oort cloud was hypothesized in the 1950s, it has not yet been directly observed. The mission would attempt to detect Oort cloud objects by scanning for brief moments where the objects would block the light of background stars.

In 2011, three finalists were selected for the 2016 Discovery Program, and Whipple was not among them, but it was awarded funding to continue its technological development efforts.

== Description ==
Whipple would orbit in a halo orbit around the Earth–Sun L_{2} and have a photometer that would try to detect Oort cloud and Kuiper belt objects (KBOs) by recording their transits of distant stars. It would be designed to detect objects out to 10000 AU. Some of the mission goals included directly detecting the Oort cloud for the first time and determining the outer limit of the Kuiper belt. Whipple would be designed to detect objects as small as a kilometer (half a mile) across at a distance of 3,200 billion kilometers; 22,000 astronomical units (2×10^{12} mi). Its telescope would need a relatively wide field of view and fast recording cadence to capture transits that may last only seconds.

In 2011, Whipple was one of three proposals to win a technology development award in a Discovery Program selection. The design proposed was a catadioptric Cassegrain telescope with a 77-centimeter aperture (30.3 inches). It would have a wide field of view with a fast read-out CMOS detector to achieve the desired time and photometric sensitivity.

The smallest KBO yet detected was discovered in 2009 by poring over data from the Hubble Space Telescope's fine guidance sensors. Astronomers detected a transit of an object against a distant star, which, based on the duration and amount of dimming, was calculated to be a KBO about 1,000 meters (3,200 ft) in diameter. It has been suggested that the Kepler space telescope may be able to detect objects in the Oort cloud by their occultation of background stars.

== See also ==
- Fred Lawrence Whipple Observatory
- List of proposed space observatories
- List of Solar System objects most distant from the Sun
- List of space observatories
- NEO Surveyor, a planned space telescope
- New Horizons, Pluto and KBO flyby probe
- Whipple shield, a type of spacecraft shielding
