= Fine Guidance Sensor (HST) =

Hubble Space Telescope instrument system

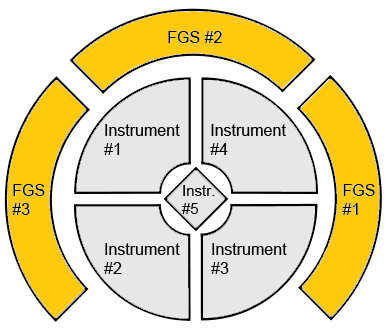
From the center to outer edge of the FGS field of view is 14.1 arcminutes This is a diagram of the field of view of each Hubble Space Telescope instrument, including the three FGS instruments (FGS field of view(s) highlighted in yellow)

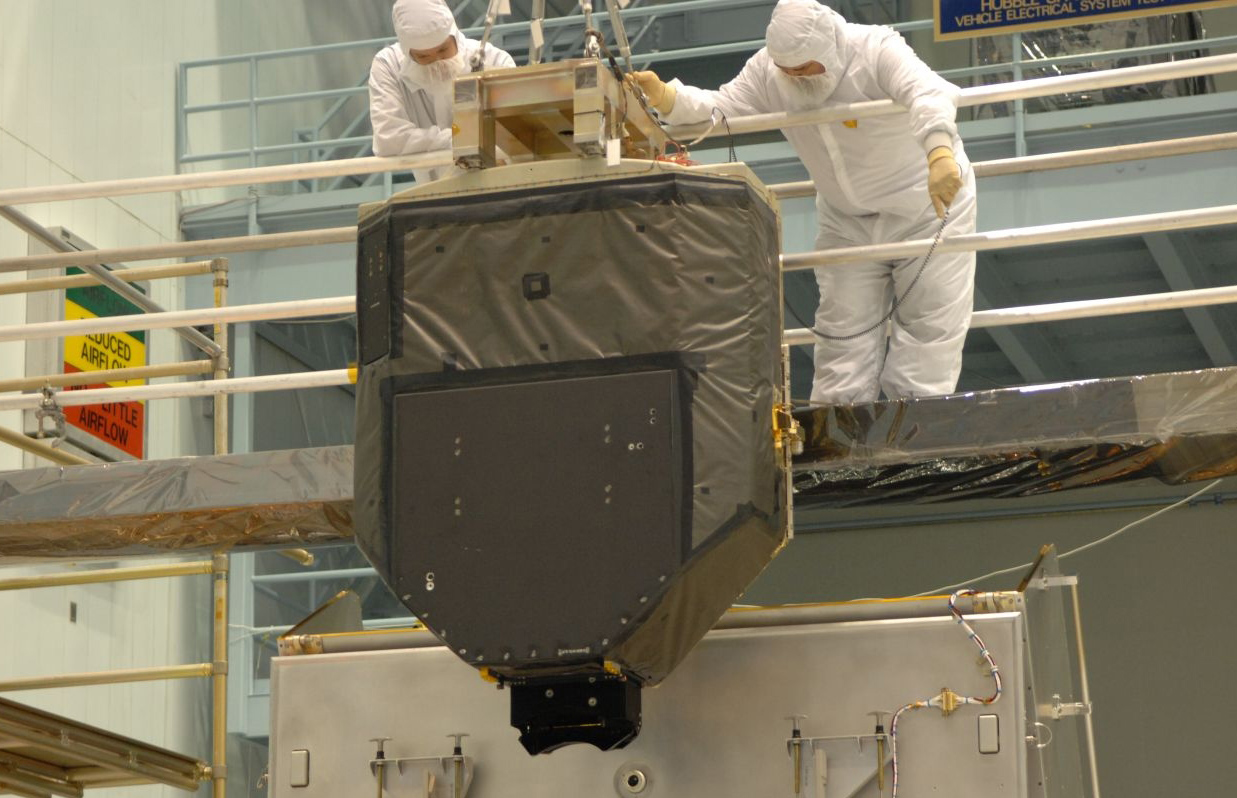
A Fine Guidance Sensor being refurbished between servicing missions SM3A and SM4

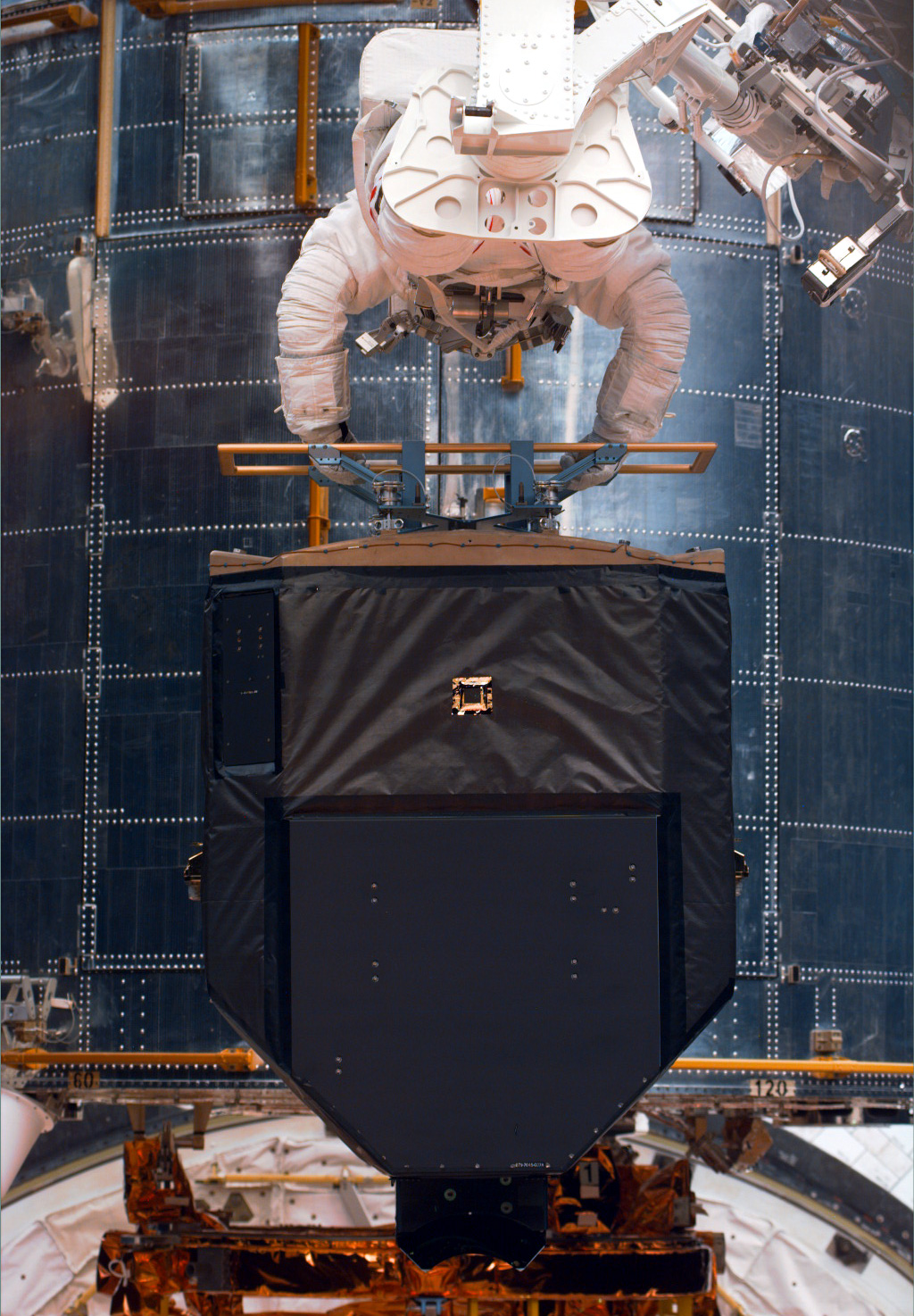
A fine guidance sensors in space on STS Servicing Mission 2 in 1997

Fine Guidance Sensor (FGS) for the Hubble Space Telescope is a system of three instruments used for pointing the telescope in space, and also for astrometry and its related sciences. To enable aiming the telescope at a specific spot in the sky, each FGS combines optics and electronics. There are three Hubble FGS, and they have been upgraded over the lifetime of the telescope by crewed Space Shuttle missions. The instruments can support pointing of 2 milli-arc seconds (units of degree). The three FGS are part of the Hubble Space Telescope's Pointing Control System, a.k.a. PCS. The FGS function in combination with the Hubble main computer and gyroscopes, with the FGS providing data to the computer as sensors which enables the HST to track astronomical targets.

The FGS can be used to locate something in space, and then lock-on to it. It can provide the movements the telescope must make to keep the object in view, for the main instruments to record data on.

The FGS were originally made by the optics company Perkin-Elmer, and as removable and repairable instruments it has been possible to refurbish them over the lifetime of the telescope. The first replacement FGS was installed in 1997, swapping out FGS1.

In May 2009, on STS-125 a FGS was replaced during the mission to the Hubble telescope by the Space Shuttle. The astronaut crew performed an EVA (spacewalk) to service the FGS and other components on the telescope in Earth orbit. This was the SM4 mission.

An example of astrometry science with the Hubble FGS system is observations of the Low-Mass Binary star system L722-22. Observations were taken of the system in 1990s, and the data helped determine the mass of each of the components of L722-22, which is also known as LHS 1047 and GJ 1005.

The FGS are white-light shearing interferometers. The FGS weigh 220 kg (485 lb) and have dimensions of roughly 0.5 m × 1.0 m × 1.6 meters.

== Observations ==
The smallest Kuiper belt object (KBO) yet detected at that time was discovered in 2009 by poring over data from the Hubble Space Telescope's fine guidance sensors. They detected a transit of an object against a distant star, which, based on the duration and amount of dimming, was calculated to be a KBO about 1,000 meters (3,200 ft) in diameter. It has been suggested that the Kepler observatory may be able to detect objects in the Oort cloud by their occultation of background stars, and the Whipple proposal would also try to use this concept.

A Hubble FGS has also been used for astrometry, tracking the movement of different stars. This ability was used for exoplanet research, where the motion of the star caused by the movement of planets around it was detected. Hubble was used via the FGS sensors to detect the motion of star caused by an exoplanet orbiting it. The effect on the red dwarf Gliese 876's by companion Gliese 876b was measured.

FGS was used to study double-star systems (a.k.a. binary star systems) and to measure distances to astronomical bodies.

FGS has also been used to observe asteroids and calculate their size. Asteroids studied include (63) Ausonia, (15) Eunomia, (43) Ariadne, (44) Nysa, and (624) Hektor.

== See also ==
- Fine guidance sensor
- Fine Guidance Sensor and Near Infrared Imager and Slitless Spectrograph (FGS for JWST)
- Guide Star Catalog (Hubble)
- Kepler space telescope
- Whipple (spacecraft) (Occultation type Space telescope concept)
