= 63 Ausonia =

Main-belt asteroid

- VLT-SPHERE image of Ausonia

Discovery
- Discovered by: A. de Gasparis
- Discovery site: Capodimonte Obs.
- Discovery date: 10 February 1861

Designations
- Pronunciation: /ɔːˈsoʊniə/
- Named after: Ausonia (ancient name for Italy)
- Alternative designations: 1947 NA · 1948 WT
- Minor planet category: main-belt · (inner); Vesta
- Adjectives: Ausonian /ɔːˈsoʊniən/

Orbital characteristics
- Epoch 4 September 2017 (JD 2458000.5)
- Uncertainty parameter 0
- Observation arc: 156.34 yr (57,104 days)
- Aphelion: 2.6993 AU
- Perihelion: 2.0910 AU
- Semi-major axis: 2.3951 AU
- Eccentricity: 0.1270
- Orbital period (sidereal): 3.71 yr (1,354 days)
- Mean anomaly: 340.16°
- Mean motion: 0° 15^{m} 57.24^{s} / day
- Inclination: 5.7763°
- Longitude of ascending node: 337.75°
- Argument of perihelion: 295.78°

Physical characteristics
- Dimensions: 152 × 77 × 69 km (± 4 × 4 × 3 km)
- Mean diameter: 93±3 km
- Mass: (1.2±0.2)×10^{18} kg (composite estimate) (8.7±1.3)×10^{17} kg (Note: Calculated from its standard gravitational parameter GM = 0.058±0.009 km^{3}/s^{2}.)
- Mean density: 2.96±0.61 g/cm^{3} 2.05±0.39 g/cm^{3}
- Synodic rotation period: 9.297587±0.000001 h
- Axial tilt: 120°
- Pole ecliptic longitude: 121°±2°
- Pole ecliptic latitude: −27°±2°
- Geometric albedo: 0.195 (calculated)
- Spectral type: Tholen = S SMASS = Sa; S B–V = 0.916; U–B = 0.500
- Absolute magnitude (H): 7.55; 7.13

63 Ausonia is a stony Vestian asteroid from the inner region of the asteroid belt, approximately 100 kilometers (60 miles) in diameter. It was discovered by Italian astronomer Annibale de Gasparis on 10 February 1861, from the Astronomical Observatory of Capodimonte, in Naples, Italy. The initial choice of name for the asteroid was "Italia", after Italy, but this was modified to Ausonia, an ancient classical name for the Italian region.

== Orbit and classification ==
Ausonia is a member of the Vesta family. Vestian asteroids have a composition akin to cumulate eucrites (HED meteorites) and are thought to have originated deep within 4 Vesta's crust, possibly from the Rheasilvia crater, a large impact crater on its southern hemisphere near the South pole, formed as a result of a subcatastrophic collision. Vesta is the main belt's second-largest and second-most-massive body after Ceres.

It orbits the Sun in the inner asteroid belt with a semi-major axis of 2.40 astronomical units (AU) once every 3 years and 9 months (1,354 days). Its distance from the Sun ranges from 2.09 AU at perihelion to 2.70 AU at aphelion. Its orbit has an eccentricity of 0.13 and an inclination of 6° with respect to the ecliptic plane.

== Physical characteristics ==
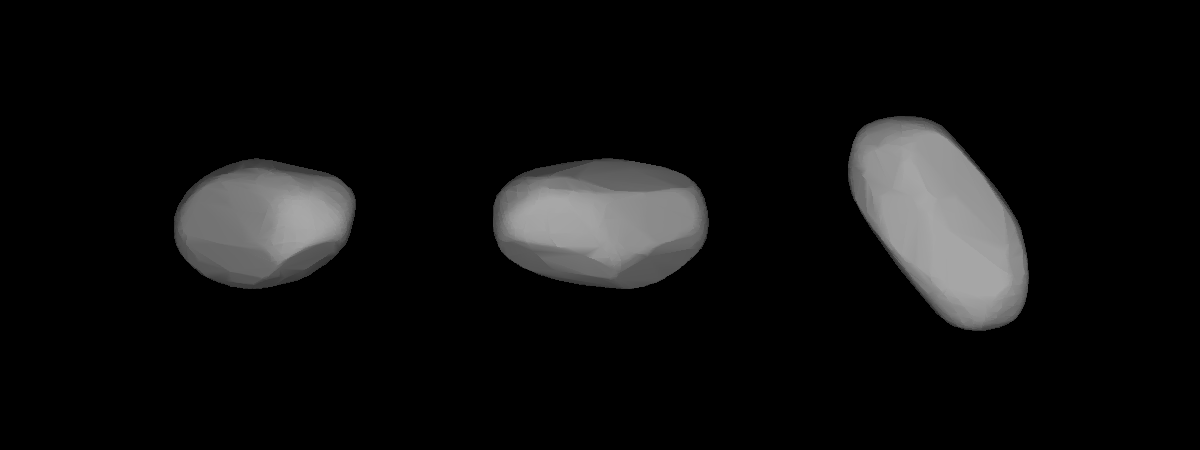
Lightcurve-based 3D-model of Ausonia

In the Tholen classification, Ausonia is a stony S-type asteroid, while in the SMASS classification, it is an Sa-subtype, that transitions from the S-type to the uncommon A-type asteroid. The body's stony composition has also been confirmed by polarimetric observations in 2017. Based on its lightcurve, a small moon had been suggested but never confirmed.

According to the surveys carried out by the Infrared Astronomical Satellite IRAS, the Japanese Akari satellite and the NEOWISE mission of NASA's Wide-field Infrared Survey Explorer, Ausonia measures between 87.47 and 116.044 kilometers in diameter and its surface has an albedo between 0.125 and 0.25. The Collaborative Asteroid Lightcurve Link derives an albedo of 0.2082 and a diameter of 90 kilometers based on an absolute magnitude of 7.55.

Ausonia was in a study using the Hubble FGS. Other studied asteroids included 15 Eunomia, 43 Ariadne, 44 Nysa, and 624 Hektor.
