= 800 Kressmannia =

Main-belt asteroid

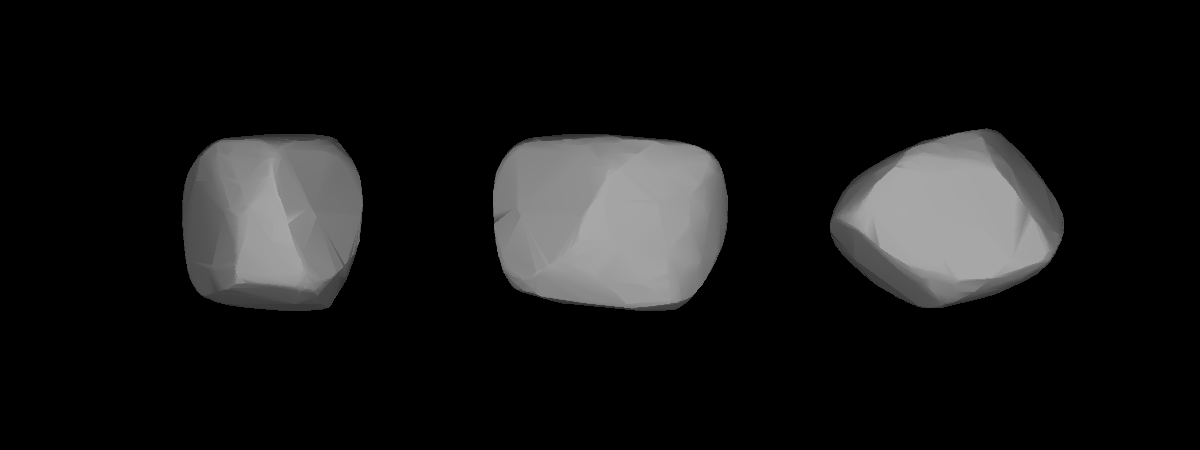
- A three-dimensional model of 800 Kressmannia based on its light curve

Discovery
- Discovered by: Max Wolf
- Discovery site: Heidelberg Observatory
- Discovery date: 20 March 1915

Designations
- Pronunciation: /krɛsˈmæniə/
- Alternative designations: 1915 WP; A905 CF; A912 GC

Orbital characteristics
- Epoch 31 July 2016 (JD 2457600.5)
- Uncertainty parameter 0
- Observation arc: 104.01 yr (37991 d)
- Aphelion: 2.6341 AU (394.06 Gm)
- Perihelion: 1.7512 AU (261.98 Gm)
- Semi-major axis: 2.1926 AU (328.01 Gm)
- Eccentricity: 0.20134
- Orbital period (sidereal): 3.25 yr (1185.9 d)
- Mean anomaly: 316.007°
- Mean motion: 0° 18^{m} 12.852^{s} / day
- Inclination: 4.2623°
- Longitude of ascending node: 325.184°
- Argument of perihelion: 347.603°

Physical characteristics
- Mean diameter: 15 km
- Synodic rotation period: 4.464 h (0.1860 d)
- Absolute magnitude (H): 11.61

800 Kressmannia is an S-type asteroid belonging to the Flora family in the Main Belt. As of 2026, its rotation period is 4.464 hours, which is consistent with a 2000 study that found a period of 4.457 hours.
