= 43 Ariadne =

Main-belt asteroid

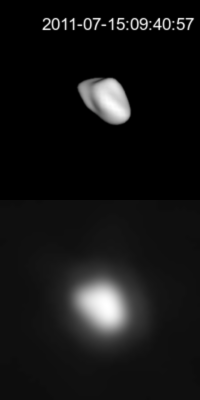
- A three-dimensional model of 43 Ariadne based on its light curve on the top and an image of the asteroid on the bottom

Discovery
- Discovered by: N. R. Pogson
- Discovery date: 15 April 1857

Designations
- Pronunciation: /æriˈædniː/
- Named after: Ariadne
- Minor planet category: Main belt (Flora family)
- Adjectives: Ariadnean, Ariadnian /æriˈædniən/

Orbital characteristics
- Epoch 26 November 2005 (JD 2453700.5)
- Aphelion: 384.954 million km (2.573 AU)
- Perihelion: 274.339 million km (1.834 AU)
- Semi-major axis: 329.646 million km (2.204 AU)
- Eccentricity: 0.168
- Orbital period (sidereal): 1194.766 d (3.27 a)
- Mean anomaly: 101.582°
- Inclination: 3.464°
- Longitude of ascending node: 264.937°
- Argument of perihelion: 15.948°

Physical characteristics
- Dimensions: 95 km × 60 km × 50 km
- Mean diameter: 59 ± 4 km
- Mass: (3.27 ± 1.35/0.59)×10^{17} kg
- Mean density: 3.042 ± 1.255/0.547 g/cm^{3}
- Synodic rotation period: 5.76199 h
- Pole ecliptic longitude: 252° ± 3°
- Pole ecliptic latitude: −9° ± 3°
- Geometric albedo: 0.274
- Spectral type: S
- Apparent magnitude: 8.8 to 13.42
- Absolute magnitude (H): 7.93
- Angular diameter: 0.11–0.025″

43 Ariadne is a fairly large and bright main-belt asteroid. It is the second-largest member of the Flora asteroid family. It was discovered by N. R. Pogson on 15 April 1857 and named after the Greek heroine Ariadne.

== Characteristics ==
Ariadne is very elongate (almost twice as long as its smallest dimension) and probably bi-lobed or at least very angular. It is a retrograde rotator, although its pole points almost parallel to the ecliptic towards ecliptic coordinates (β, λ) = (−15°, 253°) with a 10° uncertainty. This gives an axial tilt of about 105°.

== Studies ==
43 Ariadne was in a study of asteroids using the Hubble FGS. Asteroids studied include (63) Ausonia, (15) Eunomia, (43) Ariadne, (44) Nysa, and (624) Hektor.
