= J. S. Fletcher =

English journalist and author (1863–1935)

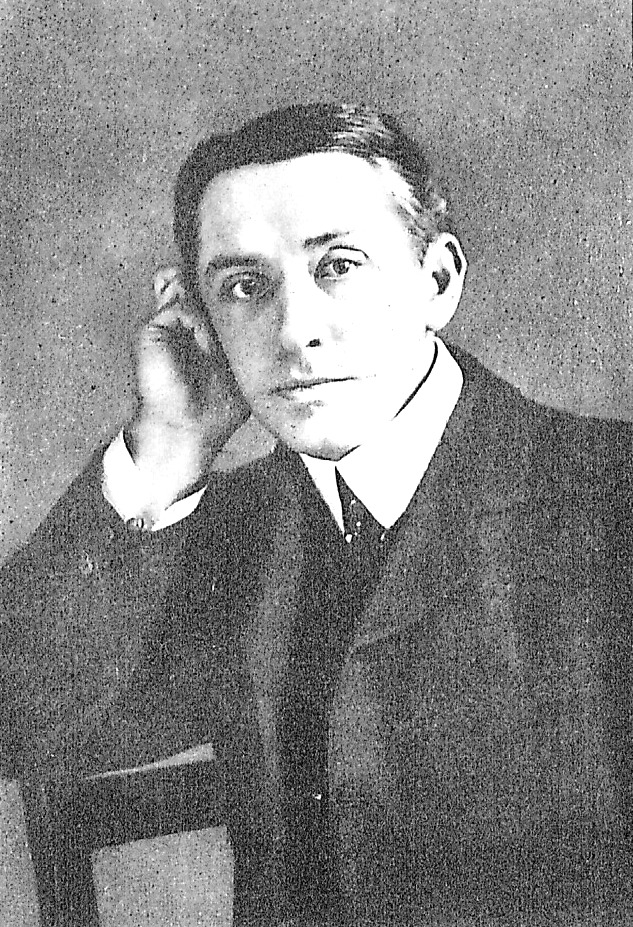
J. S. Fletcher as a young man

Joseph Smith Fletcher (7 February 1863 – 30 January 1935) was an English journalist and author. He wrote more than 230 books on a wide variety of subjects, both fiction and non-fiction, and was one of the most prolific English writers of detective fiction.

== Early life and education ==
Fletcher was born in Halifax, West Yorkshire, the son of a clergyman. His father died when he was eight months old, and after which his grandmother raised him on a farm in Darrington, near Pontefract. He was educated at Silcoates School in Wakefield, and after some study of law, he became a journalist.

== Writing career ==
At age 20, Fletcher began working in journalism, as a sub-editor in London. He subsequently returned to his native Yorkshire, where he worked first on the Leeds Mercury using the pseudonym A Son of the Soil, and then as a special correspondent for the Yorkshire Post covering Edward VII's coronation in 1902.

Fletcher's first books published were poetry. He then moved on to write numerous works of historical fiction and history, many dealing with Yorkshire, which led to his selection as a fellow of the Royal Historical Society.

Michael Sadleir stated that Fletcher's historical novel, When Charles I Was King (1892), was his best work. Fletcher wrote several novels of rural life in imitation of Richard Jefferies, beginning with The Wonderful Wapentake (1894).

In 1914, Fletcher wrote his first detective novel and went on to write over a hundred more, many featuring the private investigator Ronald Camberwell.

Fletcher published multiple crime fiction novels during the "Golden Age of Detective Fiction," namely his The Middle Temple Murder (1919) which served as the basic formulaic template for writing detective fiction novels; though, this particular novel (in addition to many of his others) did not share many general traits with those that characterize this particular literary era. On the contrary, it's argued that Fletcher is an almost exact contemporary of Conan Doyle. Most of his detective fiction works considerably pre-date that era, and even those few published within it do not conform to the closed form and strict rules professed, if not unfailingly observed, by the Golden Age writers.

== Personal life ==
He married the Irish writer Rosamond Langbridge in 1927, with whom he had one son, Rev. Valentine Fletcher (1914–1993), who held various ministries across Yorkshire, including Bradford and Sedbergh, and was himself a writer, author of various children's books and of Chimney Pots and Stacks, on the British domestic chimney pot.

== Death ==
Fletcher died in Surrey on 30 January 1935, one week short of his 72nd birthday. He was survived by his wife Rosamond and son Valentine.

== Works ==
=== Novels ===
- Frank Carisbroke's Stratagem (1888)
- Andrewlina (1889)
- Mr. Spivey's Clerk (1890)
- When Charles the First Was King (1892)
- In the Days of Drake (1895)
- Where Highways Cross (1895)
- Mistress Spitfire (1896)
- The Death That Lurks Unseen (1899)
- Baden Powell of Mafeking (1900)
- The Three Days' Terror (1901)
- Lucian the Dreamer (1903)
- The Mantle of Ishmael (1909)
- 'The Golden Venture' (1912?)
- Perris of the Cherry-Trees (1913)
- The King versus Wargrave (1915)
- The Rayner-Slade Amalgamation (1917)
- The Chestermarke Instinct (1918)
- The Borough Treasurer (1919)
- The Middle Temple Murder (1919)
- The Talleyrand Maxim (1919)
- Scarhaven Keep (1920)
- The Herapath Property (1920)
- The Lost Mr. Linthwaite (1920)
- The Orange-Yellow Diamond (1920)
- The Markenmore Mystery (1921)
- The Root of All Evil (1921)
- Wrychester Paradise (1921)
- The Herapath Property (1921)
- In the Mayor's Parlour (1922)
- Ravensdene Court (1922)
- The Middle of Things (1922)
- The Lost Mr Linthwaite (1923)
- The Million Dollar Diamond (1923)
- The Charing Cross Mystery (1923)
- The Mazaroff Murder (1923)
- The Ambitious Lady (1923)
- Exterior to the Evidence (1923)
- The Kang-He Vase (1924)
- The Safety Pin (1924)
- Sea Fog (1925)
- The Bedford Row Mystery (1925)
- The Cartwright Gardens Murder (1925)
- The Mill of Many Windows (1925)
- The Secret Way (1925)
- The Wolves and the Lamb (1925)
- The Amaranth Club (1926)
- The Stolen Budget (1926)
- The Passenger to Folkestone (1927)
- The Harvest Moon (1927)
- The Black House in Harley Street (1928)
- Dead Men's Money (1928)
- The Double Chance (1928)
- The Ransom for London (1929)
- The Yorkshire Moorland Mystery (1930)
- The Burma Ruby (1931)
- Murder at Wrides Park (1931)
- Murder in Four Degrees (1931)
- Murder of the Ninth Baronet (1932)
- Murder in the Squire's Pew (1932)
- The Borgia Cabinet (1932)
- The Solution of a Mystery (1932)
- The Pigeon's Cave (1933)
- Mystery of the London Banker (1933)
- The Murder of the Secret Agent (1934)
- Todmanhawe Grange (completed after his death by Edward Powys Mathers as Torquemada, 1937)
- And Sudden Death (1938)

=== Short stories ===
- God's Failures (1897)
- At the Blue Bell Inn (1898)
- Pasquinado (1898)
- From the Broad Acres: Stories Illustrative of Rural Life in Yorkshire (1899)
- The Air-Ship, and Other Stories (1903)
- The Fear of the Night, and Other Stories (1903)
- For Those Were Stirring Times! and Other Stories (1904)
- Miscellaneous Stories (1907) – all stories later reprinted in other volumes
  - Contents:
    - "The Ivory God"
    - "The New Sun"
    - "The Other Sense"
    - "The Lighthouse on Shivering Sand"
- The Ivory God, and Other Stories (1907)
- The Adventures of Archer Dawe (1909) – also published as The Contents of the Coffin (1928)
- The Wheatstack, and Other Stories (1909)
- Mr. Poskitt's Nightcaps (1910)
- The Adventures of Turco Bullworthy (1912)
- Paul Campenhaye, Specialist in Criminology (1918)
- Many Engagements (1923)
- The Secret of the Barbican, and Other Stories (1924)
- Safe Number Sixty-Nine, and Other Stories (1926) – all stories later reprinted in The Massingham Butterfly, and Other Stories
  - Contents:
    - "Safe Number Sixty-Nine"
    - "The Portrait of a Gentleman"
    - "First Thoughts Are Worst"
    - "The Monument"
- Green Ink, and Other Stories (1926)
- The Massingham Butterfly, and Other Stories (1926)
- The Ravenswood Mystery, and Other Stories (1929) – also published as The Canterbury Mystery (1933)
- Behind the Monocle, and Other Stories (1930)
- The Heaven-Sent Witness, and Other Stories (1930)
- The Marrendon Mystery, and Other Stories of Crime and Detection (1930)
- The Malachite Jar (1930) – also published as The Flamstock Mystery (1932); excludes three stories from the original Malachite edition
- The Man in No. 3: And Other Stories of Crime, Love, and Mystery (1931)
- The Man in the Fur Coat, and Other Stories (1932)
- The Murder in Medora Mansions, and Other Stories of Crime and Mystery (1933)
- J. S. Fletcher Omnibus – contents: The Malachite Jar; The Marrendon Mystery; The Man in No. 3; The Man in the Fur Coat (1933)
- The Carrismore Ruby, and Other Stories (1935)

=== Poetry ===
- The Juvenile Poems of Joseph S. Fletcher (1879)
- Early Poems by Joseph Smith Fletcher (1882)
- Anima Christi (1884)
- Deus Homo (1887)
- Poems, Chiefly against Pessimism (1893)
- Ballads of Revolt (1897)
- Leet Livvy (1915)
- Collected Verse (1881-1931) (1931)

=== Historical works ===
- The Reformation in Northern England (1925)
