= 352 Gisela =

Main-belt asteroid

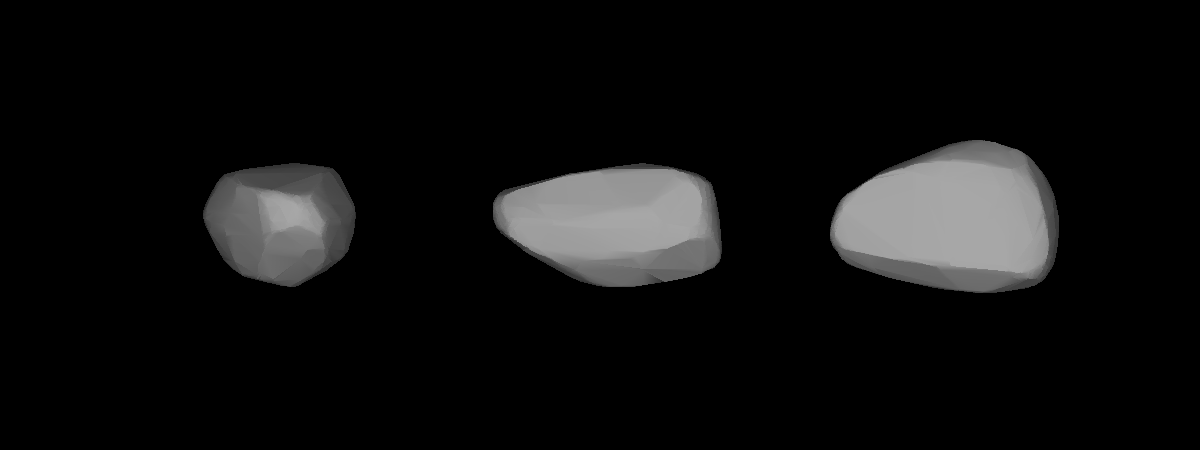
- A three-dimensional model of 352 Gisela based on its light curve.

Discovery
- Discovered by: Max Wolf
- Discovery date: 12 January 1893

Designations
- Pronunciation: German: [ˈɡiːzəlaː]
- Alternative designations: 1893 B; A895 XA; 1950 XT
- Minor planet category: Main belt (Flora family)

Orbital characteristics
- Epoch 31 July 2016 (JD 2457600.5)
- Uncertainty parameter 0
- Observation arc: 117.47 yr (42905 d)
- Aphelion: 2.52149 AU (377.210 Gm)
- Perihelion: 1.86634 AU (279.200 Gm)
- Semi-major axis: 2.19392 AU (328.206 Gm)
- Eccentricity: 0.14931
- Orbital period (sidereal): 3.250 yr (1,186.9 d) 3.25 yr (1186.9 d)
- Mean anomaly: 74.6135°
- Mean motion: 0° 18^{m} 11.88^{s} / day
- Inclination: 3.38092°
- Longitude of ascending node: 247.353°
- Argument of perihelion: 144.194°

Physical characteristics
- Dimensions: 20.27±2.9 km
- Mean density: ~2.7 g/cm^{3}
- Synodic rotation period: 7.4796 ± 0.0002 h (0.3116500 ± 8.3×10^{−6} d)
- Geometric albedo: 0.4261±0.153
- Spectral type: S
- Absolute magnitude (H): 10.01, 10.22

352 Gisela is an asteroid belonging to the Flora family in the Main Belt that has an unusually high albedo. It was discovered by German astronomer Max Wolf on 12 January 1893 in Heidelberg, and named after his wife. This minor planet is orbiting the Sun at a distance of 2.19 AU with a period of 3.250 yr and an orbital eccentricity of 0.149. The orbital plane is inclined at an angle of 3.38° to the plane of the ecliptic.

Photometric measurements of 352 Gisela during December 1999 were used to produce a light curve showing a sinodic rotation period of 7.49±0.01 h with a brightness variation of 0.32 in magnitude. This period estimate was refined to 7.4796±0.0002 h in 2012.
