= GJ 1005 =

Star system in the constellation Cetus

- Location of GJ 1005 in the constellation Cetus

Observation data Epoch J2000 Equinox ICRS
- Constellation: Cetus
- Right ascension: 00^{h} 15^{m} 28.11090^{s}
- Declination: −16° 08′ 01.6303″
- Apparent magnitude (V): 11.483

Characteristics
- Spectral type: M3.5V

Astrometry
Radial velocity (R_{v})	−26.43±0.1 km/s
Proper motion (μ)	RA: +731.83 mas/yr Dec.: −607.73 mas/yr
Parallax (π)	166.6±0.3 mas
Distance	19.58 ± 0.04 ly (6.00 ± 0.01 pc)
Absolute magnitude (M_{V})	12.70±0.01 / 15.12±0.09

Orbit
Period (P)	4.55726^{+0.00075}_{−0.00074} y.
Semi-major axis (a)	0.3037±0.0005" (1.823 AU (Note: Semi-major axis in AU = $\frac{semimajor\ axis\ in\ seconds}{parallax}\ {{=}}\ \frac{.3037}{.1666}$ = 1.823 AU; as the eccentricity is 0.36, the distance fluctuates between 64% and 136% of that, roughly from 1.17 AU to 2.48 AU.))
Eccentricity (e)	0.36136^{+0.00097}_{−0.00098}
Inclination (i)	143.93^{+0.25}_{−0.24}°
Longitude of the node (Ω)	62.8±0.4°
Periastron epoch (T)	JD 2449850.4±0.8
Argument of periastron (ω) (secondary)	166.6±0.5°

Details

GJ 1005 A
Mass	0.179±0.002 M_{☉}
Radius	0.23 R_{☉}
Temperature	3,341±224 K
Metallicity [Fe/H]	−0.41 dex

GJ 1005 B
Mass	0.112±0.001 M_{☉}

Other designations
- HIP 1242, G 158-50, G 266-76, LHS 1047, LP 764-87, LTT 114, 2MASS J00152799-1608008, Gaia DR2 2368293487260807040

Database references
SIMBAD	data
ARICNS	A
- B

GJ 1005 is a system of two red dwarfs, located in constellation Cetus at 19.6 light-years from Earth. The primary star is a M4V class star while the secondary is a class M7V.

The system was observed with the Hubble Space Telescope in the 1990s with its Fine Guidance Sensor. This data helped determine the mass of each of the components of L722-22/ LHS 1047 / GJ 1005.
