= Rosamunde (disambiguation) =

Rosamunde is an 1823 play by Helmina von Chézy.

Rosamunde may also refer to:

- Rosamunde (Schubert), the incidental music for the 1823 play, composed by Franz Schubert
- Rosamunde (Schweitzer), a 1780 singspiel by Anton Schweitzer
- Rosamunde String Quartet (String Quartet No. 13, Op. 29, D. 804), an 1824 quartet by Schubert
  - Rosamunde Quartett, a German string quartet named after Schubert's string quartet
- "Rosamunde", or "Beer Barrel Polka" (German song), a 1927 polka composed by Czech musician Jaromír Vejvoda
- 540 Rosamunde, an asteroid
- Rosamunde Pilcher (1924−2019), British novelist

== See also ==
- Rosamund (disambiguation)
- Rosamond (disambiguation)
