= Flora family =

Grouping of S-type asteroids

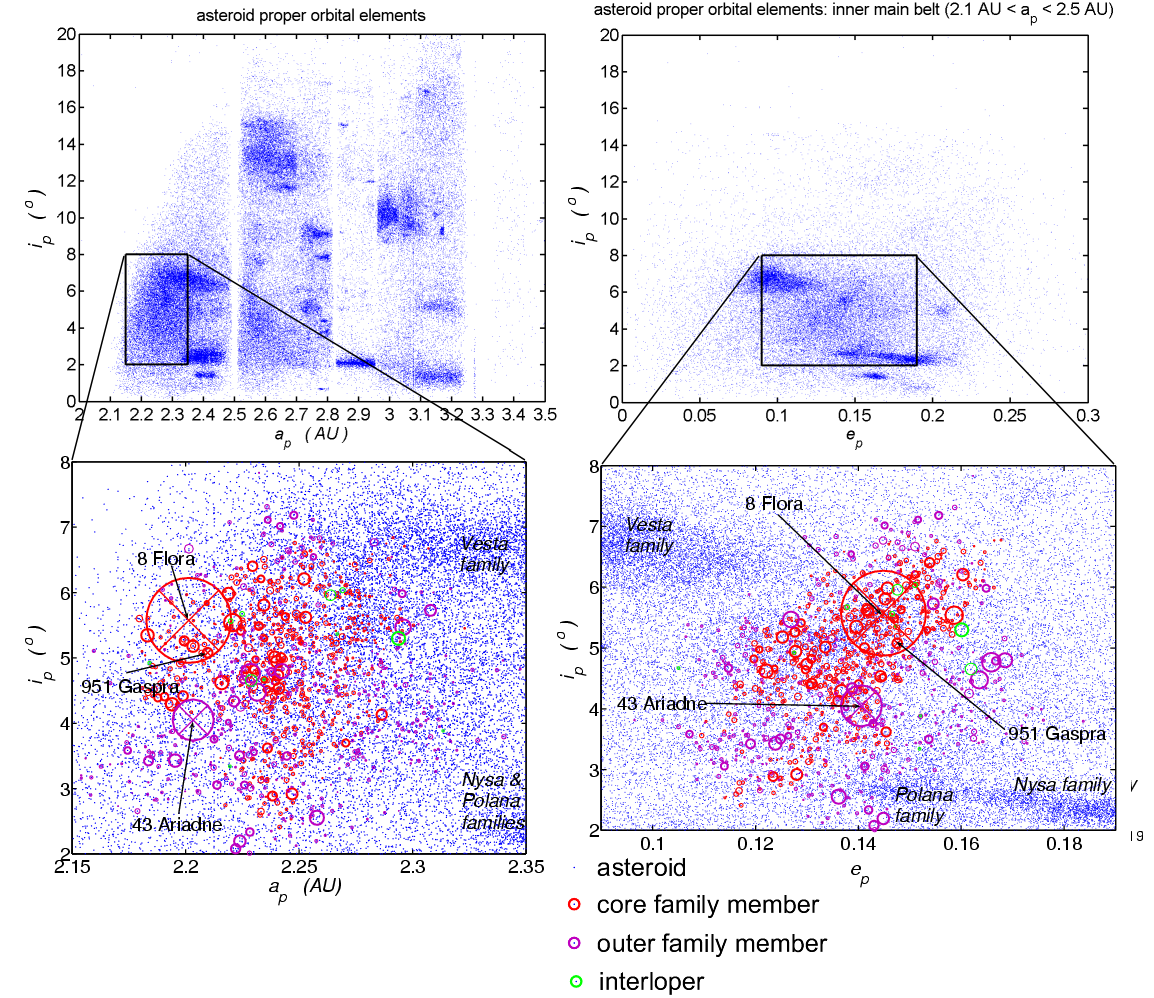
Location and structure of the Flora family within the asteroid belt

The Flora family (adj. Florian; FIN: 402; also known as the Ariadne family) is a prominent family of stony asteroids located in the inner region of the asteroid belt. It is one of the largest families with more than 13,000 known members, or approximately 3.5% of all main-belt asteroids.

The origin and properties of this family are relatively poorly understood. It is a very broad family which gradually fades into the surrounding background population. While the largest members, 8 Flora and 43 Ariadne, are located near the edge, there are several distinct groupings within the family, possibly created by later, secondary collisions. Due to this complex internal structure and the poorly defined boundaries, the Flora family has also been described as an asteroid clan. Only a few interlopers have been identified. This family may be the source of the impactor that formed the Chicxulub crater, the likely culprit in the extinction of the dinosaurs.

== Characteristics ==
The largest member is 8 Flora, which measures 140 km in diameter and comprises about 80% of the total family mass. 43 Ariadne makes up much of the remaining mass (about a further 9%). Because of the family's poorly defined boundaries, and the location of Flora itself near the edge, it has also been called the "Ariadne family", when Flora did not make it into the group during an analysis (e.g. the WAM analysis by Zappalà, 1995). The remaining family members are fairly small, below 30 km in diameter.

A noticeable fraction of the parent body has been lost from the family since the original impact, presumably due to later processes such as secondary collisions. For example, it has been estimated that Flora contains only about 57% of the parent body's mass (Tanga 1999), but about 80% of the mass in the present family.

The Flora family is very broad and gradually fades into the background population (which is particularly dense in this part of space) in such a way that its boundaries are very poorly defined. There are also several non-uniformities or lobes within the family, one cause of which may have been later secondary collisions between family members. Hence, it is a classical example of a so-called asteroid clan. The largest members, 8 Flora and 43 Ariadne, are located near the edge of the family. The reason for this unusual mass distribution within the family is unknown at present.

951 Gaspra, a medium-sized core family member, was visited by the Galileo spacecraft on its way to Jupiter, and is one of the most extensively studied asteroids. Studies of Gaspra suggests that the family's age is of the order of 200 million years (indicated by the crater density), and that the parent body was at least partially differentiated (indicated by the high abundance of olivine) (Veverka 1994).

The Flora family members are considered good candidates for being the parent bodies of the L chondrite meteorites (Nesvorny 2002), which contribute about 38% of all meteorites impacting of the Earth. This theory is supported by the family's location close to the unstable zone of the ν_{6} secular resonance, and because the spectral properties of family members are consistent with being the parent bodies of this meteorite type.

The Flora family was one of the five original Hirayama families that were first identified. It has a high number of early discovered members both because S-type asteroids tend to have high albedo, and because it is the closest major asteroid grouping to Earth.

== Large members ==

- 8 Flora: 36.1 (77.0%)
- 43 Ariadne: 5.52 (11.8%)
- 364 Isara: 0.363 (0.8%)
- 352 Gisela: 0.275 (0.6%)
- 540 Rosamunde: 0.112 (0.2%)
- 823 Sisigambis: 0.0611 (0.1%)
- 800 Kressmannia: 0.049 (0.1%)
- 1419 Danzig: 0.0457 (0.1%)
- 1249 Rutherfordia: 0.0439 (0.1%)
- 951 Gaspra: 0.0439 (0.1%)
- All other members: 4.24 (9.0%)
Mass distribution of the Flora family (assuming similar densities)

The 10 brightest Flora family members
Name	Abs. Mag	Size (km)	proper a (AU)	proper e	proper i
8 Flora	6.61	147	2.2014	0.145	5.573
43 Ariadne	7.97	71	2.2034	0.141	4.049
364 Isara	9.94	26	2.2208	0.159	5.540
352 Gisela	10.14	27	2.1941	0.137	4.289
540 Rosamunde	10.79	19	2.2189	0.154	6.403
823 Sisigambis	11.23	15	2.2213	0.139	4.336
800 Kressmannia	11.39	15	2.1927	0.140	4.301
1419 Danzig	11.44	15	2.2928	0.170	6.403
1249 Rutherfordia	11.47	13	2.2243	0.129	5.413
951 Gaspra	11.47	12	2.2097	0.148	5.078

== Location and size ==
A HCM numerical analysis by Vincenzo Zappalà in 1995 determined a large group of 'core' family members, whose proper orbital elements lie in the approximate ranges

	a_{p}	e_{p}	i_{p}
min	2.17 AU	0.109	2.4°
max	2.33 AU	0.168	6.9°

The boundaries of the family are, however, very indistinct. At the present epoch, the range of osculating orbital elements of these core members is

	a	e	i
min	2.17 AU	0.053	1.6°
max	2.33 AU	0.224	7.7°

Zappalà's 1995 analysis found 604 core members, and 1027 in a wider group. A search of a recent proper element database (AstDys)for 96944 minor planets in 2005 yielded 7438 objects lying within the rectangular-shaped region defined by the first table above. However, this also includes parts of the Vesta and Nysa families in the corners so that a more likely membership estimate is 4000–5000 objects (by eye). This means that the Flora family represents 4–5% of all main belt asteroids.

== Interlopers ==
Because of the high background density of asteroids in this part of space, one might expect that a great number of interlopers (asteroids unrelated to the collision that formed the family) would be present. However, few have been identified. This is because interlopers are hard to distinguish from family members because the family is of the same spectral type (S) that dominates the inner main belt overall. The few interlopers that have been identified are all small (Florczak et al. 1998, and also by inspection of the PDS asteroid taxonomy data set for non S-type members.) They include 298 Baptistina, 422 Berolina, 2093 Genichesk, 2259 Sofievka (the largest, with a 21 km diameter), 2952 Lilliputia, 453 Tea, 3533 Toyota, 3850 Peltier, 3875 Staehle, 4278 Harvey, 4396 Gressmann, and 4750 Mukai.
