= 364 Isara =

Main-belt asteroid

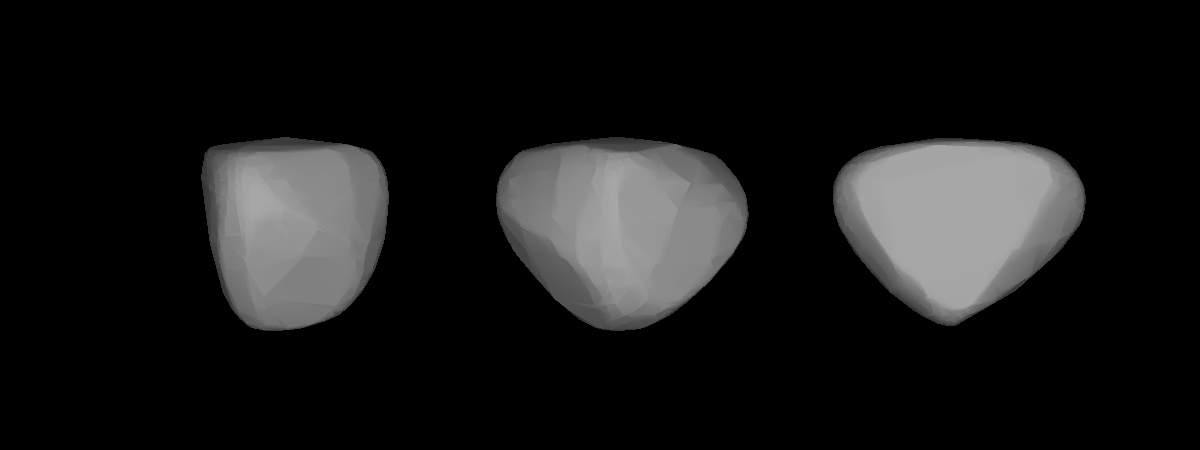
- Lightcurve-base 3D-model of 364 Isara.

Discovery
- Discovered by: A. Charlois
- Discovery site: Nice Obs.
- Discovery date: 19 March 1893

Designations
- Pronunciation: /ˈɪsərə/
- Named after: Isère River (river in France)
- Alternative designations: 1893 T · 1976 AB
- Minor planet category: main-belt · (inner); Flora

Orbital characteristics
- Epoch 4 September 2017 (JD 2458000.5)
- Uncertainty parameter 0
- Observation arc: 117.10 yr (42,772 days)
- Aphelion: 2.5532 AU
- Perihelion: 1.8881 AU
- Semi-major axis: 2.2206 AU
- Eccentricity: 0.1498
- Orbital period (sidereal): 3.31 yr (1,209 days)
- Mean anomaly: 322.26°
- Mean motion: 0° 17^{m} 52.08^{s} / day
- Inclination: 6.0033°
- Longitude of ascending node: 105.54°
- Argument of perihelion: 312.78°

Physical characteristics
- Dimensions: 25.901±0.665 km 27.99±1.0 km 28.78±0.30 km 35.209±0.253 km
- Synodic rotation period: 9.151±0.007 h 9.155 h (Note: Yang (1965) web: rotation period 9.155 hours with a brightness amplitude of 0.35 mag. Quality Code of 2. Summary figures for (364) Isara at Collaborative Asteroid Lightcurve Link (CALL)); 9.156±0.001 h (Note: Lightcurve plot of 364 Isara, Palmer Divide Observatory, Brian D. Warner (2009)); 9.1570±0.0005 h 9.15751±0.00005 h
- Geometric albedo: 0.1625±0.0334; 0.244±0.006; 0.2566±0.020; 0.300±0.037
- Spectral type: Tholen = S · S B–V = 0.912; U–B = 0.538
- Absolute magnitude (H): 9.86

364 Isara (Note: With the primary stress on the first syllable.) is a stony Florian asteroid from the inner regions of the asteroid belt, approximately 27 kilometers in diameter. It was discovered on 19 March 1893, by French astronomer Auguste Charlois at the Nice Observatory in southeast France. The asteroid was named after the Isère River in France.

== Orbit and classification ==
Isara is a member of the Flora family (402), a giant asteroid family and the largest family of stony asteroids in the main-belt.

It orbits the Sun in the inner main-belt at a distance of 1.9–2.6 AU once every 3 years and 4 months (1,209 days). Its orbit has an eccentricity of 0.15 and an inclination of 6° with respect to the ecliptic. The body's observation arc begins at Vienna Observatory in April 1900, seven years after to its official discovery observation at Nice.

== Physical characteristics ==
In the Tholen classification, Isara is a common stony S-type asteroid, which agrees with the overall spectral type of the Flora family.

=== Rotation period ===
In 2009, photometric observations of Isara were made by American astronomer Brian Warner at the Palmer Divide Observatory (716) in Colorado, by amateur astronomer René Roy at Blauvac Observatory (627) in France, and by a group of Polish astronomers led by Agnieszka Kryszczyńska of the Polish Astronomical Society. The resulting asymmetrical lightcurves showed a synodic rotation period between 9.151 and 9.157 hours with a brightness variation between 0.30 and 0.40 in magnitude (U=3/3/2+).

The results agree with the first rotational lightcurve was already obtained in the 1960s (U=2).

=== Spin axis ===
In 2013, an international study modeled a lightcurve with a concurring period of 9.15751 hours and found two spin axis of (282.0°, 44.0°) and (86.0°, 42.0°) in ecliptic coordinates (λ, β) (Q=2).

=== Diameter and albedo ===
According to the surveys carried out by the Infrared Astronomical Satellite IRAS, the Japanese Akari satellite and the NEOWISE mission of NASA's Wide-field Infrared Survey Explorer, Isara measures between 25.901 and 35.209 kilometers in diameter and its surface has an albedo between 0.1625 and 0.300.

The Collaborative Asteroid Lightcurve Link adopt the results obtained by IRAS, that is, an albedo of 0.2566 and a diameter of 27.99 kilometers based on an absolute magnitude of 9.86.

364 Isara has been observed to occult 4 stars between 2002 and 2023.

== Naming ==
This minor planet was named after the Isère River in south eastern France. ("Isara" is an early name for this river.) The official naming citation was mentioned in The Names of the Minor Planets by Paul Herget in 1955 (H 40).
