= 823 Sisigambis =

Main-belt asteroid

Discovery
- Discovered by: Max Wolf
- Discovery site: Heidelberg
- Discovery date: 31 March 1916

Designations
- Pronunciation: /sɪsɪˈɡæmbɪs/
- Alternative designations: 1916 ZG; A913 JB; 1937 QE; 1939 FA1; 1969 FN

Orbital characteristics
- Epoch 31 July 2016 (JD 2457600.5)
- Uncertainty parameter 0
- Observation arc: 100.04 yr (36540 d)
- Aphelion: 2.4213 AU (362.22 Gm)
- Perihelion: 2.0211 AU (302.35 Gm)
- Semi-major axis: 2.2212 AU (332.29 Gm)
- Eccentricity: 0.090088
- Orbital period (sidereal): 3.31 yr (1209.2 d)
- Mean anomaly: 176.61°
- Mean motion: 0° 17^{m} 51.828^{s} / day
- Inclination: 3.6456°
- Longitude of ascending node: 255.028°
- Argument of perihelion: 218.602°
- Earth MOID: 1.03763 AU (155.227 Gm)
- Jupiter MOID: 2.65835 AU (397.683 Gm)
- T_{Jupiter}: 3.641

Physical characteristics
- Mean radius: 8.315±0.7 km
- Synodic rotation period: 146 h (6.1 d)
- Geometric albedo: 0.1793±0.034
- Absolute magnitude (H): 11.2

823 Sisigambis is an asteroid belonging to the Flora family in the Main Belt. Its diameter is about 17 km, and it has an albedo of 0.179. Its rotation period is unknown but appears to be greater than at least 12 hours. The asteroid is named after Sisygambis, the mother of Darius III of Persia.

Captured by Alexander the Great at the Battle of Issus, Sisygambis became devoted to him, and Alexander referred to her as "mother". Having learned of Alexander's death, she had become depressed and had herself sealed into her rooms and refused to eat. She is said to have died of grief and starvation four days later.
