= 1249 Rutherfordia =

Main-belt asteroid

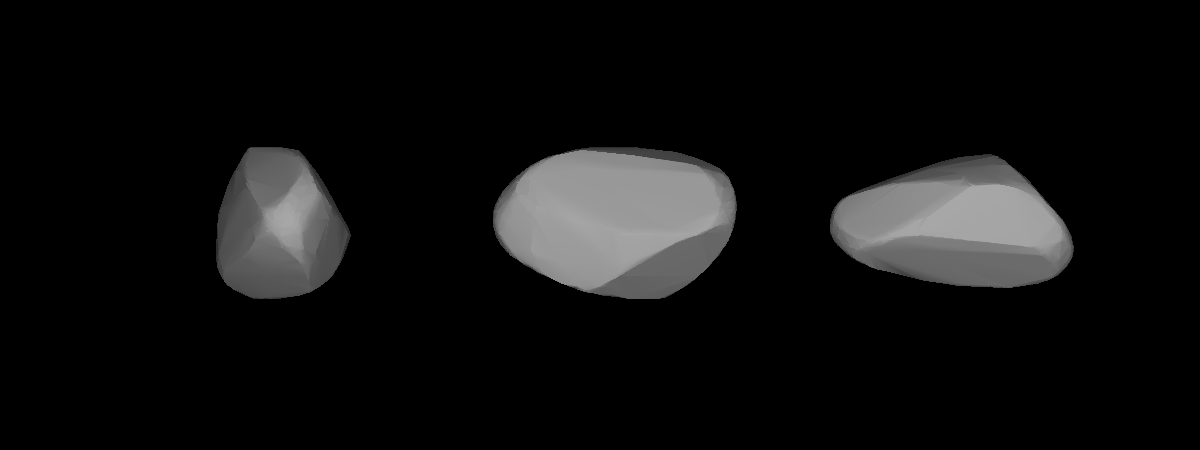
- Lightcurve-based 3D-model of Rutherfordia

Discovery
- Discovered by: K. Reinmuth
- Discovery site: Heidelberg Obs.
- Discovery date: 4 November 1932

Designations
- Named after: Rutherford (inner suburb of New York City)
- Alternative designations: 1932 VB · 1925 SF; 1942 XV
- Minor planet category: main-belt · (inner); Flora

Orbital characteristics
- Epoch 4 September 2017 (JD 2458000.5)
- Uncertainty parameter 0
- Observation arc: 84.98 yr (31,040 days)
- Aphelion: 2.3947 AU
- Perihelion: 2.0534 AU
- Semi-major axis: 2.2240 AU
- Eccentricity: 0.0767
- Orbital period (sidereal): 3.32 yr (1,211 days)
- Mean anomaly: 150.14°
- Mean motion: 0° 17^{m} 49.92^{s} / day
- Inclination: 4.8756°
- Longitude of ascending node: 259.00°
- Argument of perihelion: 223.37°

Physical characteristics
- Dimensions: 12.41±0.8 km 13.063±0.097 km 14.060±0.069 km 15.77±0.69 km
- Synodic rotation period: 18.20±0.01 h 18.220±0.005 h 18.24 h 18.242±0.001 h
- Geometric albedo: 0.172±0.017; 0.2193±0.0240; 0.251±0.058; 0.2778±0.038
- Spectral type: Tholen = S B–V = 0.883; U–B = 0.484
- Absolute magnitude (H): 10.88±0.28 · 11.54

1249 Rutherfordia, provisional designation 1932 VB, is an elongated, stony Florian asteroid from the inner regions of the asteroid belt, approximately 13 kilometers in diameter. Discovered by Karl Reinmuth at Heidelberg Observatory in 1932, the asteroid was named after Rutherford, New Jersey, a suburb of New York City, United States.

== Discovery ==
Rutherfordia was discovered on 4 November 1932, by German astronomer Karl Reinmuth at the Heidelberg-Königstuhl State Observatory in southwest Germany. On 29 November 1932, it was independently discovered by Belgian astronomer Eugène Delporte at the Uccle Observatory in Belgium. The Minor Planet Center only recognizes the first discoverer.

== Orbit and classification ==
Rutherfordia is a member of the Flora family (402), a giant asteroid family and the largest family of stony asteroids in the main-belt. It orbits the Sun in the inner asteroid belt at a distance of 2.1–2.4 AU once every 3 years and 4 months (1,211 days; semi-major axis of 2.22 AU). Its orbit has an eccentricity of 0.08 and an inclination of 5° with respect to the ecliptic.

The asteroid was first observed as 1925 SF at Simeiz Observatory in September 1925. The body's observation arc begins at Heidelberg on 22 November 1932, or three weeks after its official discovery observation.

== Physical characteristics ==
In the Tholen classification, Rutherfordia is an S-type asteroid, as is the overall spectral type of the Flora family.

=== Rotation period ===
Several rotational lightcurves of Rutherfordia have been obtained from photometric observations since 2001. The so-far best-rated lightcurve with a rotation period of 18.242 hours and a brightness amplitude of 0.71 magnitude, was measured by the Spanish amateur astronomer group OBAS in December 2015 (U=3). The asteroid's elongated shape, indicated by its high brightness amplitude has previously been confirmed by physical modelling (see below).

=== Spin axis ===
In 2013, an international study modeled a lightcurve from various data sources including the Uppsala Asteroid Photometric Catalogue and the Palomar Transient Factory survey. The lightcurve gave a concurring period of 18.2183 hours and allowed for the determination of two spin axis of (32.0°, 74.0°) and (197.0°, 65.0°) in ecliptic coordinates (λ, β).

=== Diameter and albedo ===
According to the surveys carried out by the Infrared Astronomical Satellite IRAS, the Japanese Akari satellite and the NEOWISE mission of NASA's Wide-field Infrared Survey Explorer, Rutherfordia measures between 12.41 and 15.77 kilometers in diameter and its surface has an albedo between 0.172 and 0.2778.

The Collaborative Asteroid Lightcurve Link adopts the results obtained by IRAS, that is, an albedo of 0.2778 and a diameter of 12.41 kilometers based on an absolute magnitude of 11.54.

== Naming ==
Several sources erroneously attributed the naming of this asteroid to famous New Zealand-born British physicist Ernest Rutherford (1871–1937). This minor planet, however, was named after the city of Rutherford, New Jersey, which is an inner suburb of metropolitan New York City. The naming was proposed by Irving Meyer and endorsed by German astronomer Gustav Stracke who mentioned on a postcard in February 1937, that his American college, Meyer, who himself did not discover any asteroids, requested the naming after the city of Rutherford, where a private observatory was located at the time.
