= 1419 Danzig =

Flora asteroid

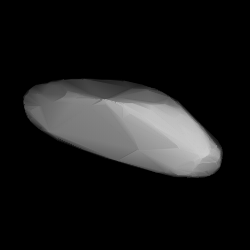
- Modelled shape of Danzig from its lightcurve

Discovery
- Discovered by: K. Reinmuth
- Discovery site: Heidelberg Obs.
- Discovery date: 5 September 1929

Designations
- Named after: German name of the Polish city of Gdańsk
- Alternative designations: 1929 RF · 1936 RD; 1952 HJ_{4} · 1957 WO_{1} A917 GA
- Minor planet category: main-belt · (inner); Flora · background

Orbital characteristics
- Epoch 16 February 2017 (JD 2457800.5)
- Uncertainty parameter 0
- Observation arc: 99.90 yr (36,489 days)
- Aphelion: 2.6285 AU
- Perihelion: 1.9570 AU
- Semi-major axis: 2.2927 AU
- Eccentricity: 0.1465
- Orbital period (sidereal): 3.47 yr (1,268 days)
- Mean anomaly: 356.63°
- Mean motion: 0° 17^{m} 2.04^{s} / day
- Inclination: 5.7254°
- Longitude of ascending node: 213.53°
- Argument of perihelion: 232.65°

Physical characteristics
- Mean diameter: 14.059±0.096 km 14.139 km 14.997±0.382 km 15.09±0.22 km
- Synodic rotation period: 8.0±0.1 h; 8.1202±0.0001 h
- Pole ecliptic latitude: (22.0°, 76.0°) (λ_{1}/β_{1})
- Geometric albedo: 0.2324; 0.2388±0.0462; 0.250±0.009; 0.260±0.023
- Spectral type: S (family-based)
- Absolute magnitude (H): 11.20 · 11.3 · 11.45±0.14 · 11.45 · 11.55±1.00

1419 Danzig (prov. designation: 1929 RF) is a highly elongated Flora asteroid from the inner regions of the asteroid belt. It was discovered on 5 September 1929, by German astronomer Karl Reinmuth at Heidelberg Observatory in southwest Germany. The stony S-type asteroid has a rotation period of 8.1 hours and measures approximately 14 kilometers (8.7 miles) in diameter. It was named for the city of Gdańsk (German: Danzig).

== Classification and orbit ==
When applying the synthetic hierarchical clustering method (HCM) by Nesvorný, Danzig is a member of the Flora family (402), a giant asteroid family and the largest family of stony asteroids in the main-belt. However, according to the 1995 HCM-analysis by Zappalà, and HCM-analysis by Milani and Knežević (AstDys), it is a background asteroid. The latter HCM-analysis does not recognize the Flora asteroid clan.

Danzig orbits the Sun at a distance of 2.0–2.6 AU once every 3 years and 6 months (1,268 days). Its orbit has an eccentricity of 0.15 and an inclination of 6° with respect to the ecliptic. In 1917, it was first observed as A917 GA at Simeiz Observatory (and Heidelberg on the following night), extending the body's observation arc by 12 years prior to its official discovery observation at Heidelberg.

== Naming ==
This minor planet was named after the now Polish city and port on the Baltic sea, Gdańsk (German: Danzig). The city was also honored by another minor planet, 764 Gedania. Naming citation was first mentioned in The Names of the Minor Planets by Paul Herget in 1955 (H 128)

== Physical characteristics ==
The overall spectral type for Florian asteroid is that of a stony S-type.

=== Rotation period and pole ===
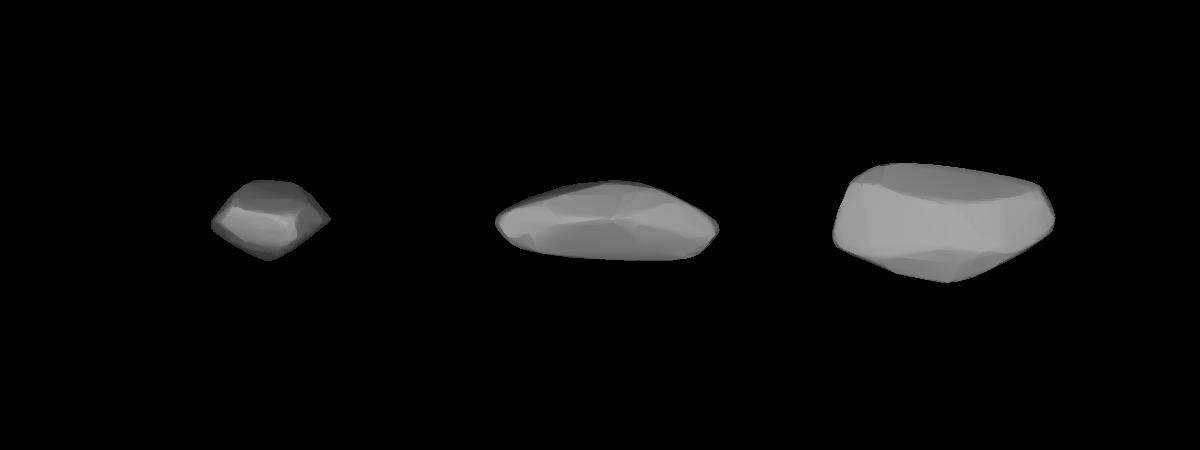
Lightcurve-based 3D-model of Danzig

In November 1988, Polish astronomer Wiesław Wiśniewski obtained a rotational lightcurve of Danzig from photometric observations. It gave a well-defined rotation period of 8.0±0.1 hours with a brightness variation of 0.92 magnitude (U=3). In October 2002, another lightcurve obtained by Italian and French amateur astronomers Silvano Casulli and Laurent Bernasconi gave a concurring period of 8.1202±0.0001 hours and an amplitude of 0.81 magnitude (U=3). While Danzig has an average rotation period, it has a high brightness variation, which indicates that the body has a non-spheroidal shape. In 2011, a modeled lightcurve using data from the Uppsala Asteroid Photometric Catalogue (UAPC) and other sources gave a period 8.11957±0.00005 hours, as well as a spin axis of (22.0°, 76.0°) in ecliptic coordinates (λ, β) (U=n.a.).

=== Diameter and albedo ===
According to the surveys carried out by the Japanese Akari satellite, and NASA's Wide-field Infrared Survey Explorer with its subsequent NEOWISE mission, Danzig measures 14.059 and 15.09 kilometers in diameter and its surface has an albedo between 0.238 and 0.260. The Collaborative Asteroid Lightcurve Link adopts Petr Pravec's revised WISE-data, that is, an albedo of 0.2324 and a diameter of 14.139 kilometers with an absolute magnitude of 11.45.
