= Arbora & Ausonia =

Company specialized in hygiene products

Arbora & Ausonia was a company that dealt in the manufacturing and sale of absorbent products for the child and family hygiene, feminine hygiene and adult incontinence markets. It fully merged into Procter & Gamble in 2013.

== History ==
Arbora Holding (founded in 1968) and Ausonia (created in 1977) merged in 1998 to form Arbora & Ausonia, a leading company in the Iberian personal care and hygiene sector market. In 1989 Arbora & Ausiona became a joint venture between Procter & Gamble, a consumer products multinational, and Agrolimen group, a Spanish holding company with international presence at the forefront of the food sector.

During this time, Arbora & Ausonia traded in Spain and Portugal, with offices in Barcelona (headquarters of the central offices) and in Oeiras (Lisbon). There were nearly 1,300 employees distributed throughout its offices and plants. The Arbora & Ausonia plant in Jijona, the industrial site with the highest number of employees in all the province of Alicante, employed 500 people. The plant had also grown considerably from 2,600 square metres in the 80's, to an area of 59,500 square metres. Arbora & Ausonia, had a further two plants in Mequinenza (Zaragoza) and Montornès del Vallès (Barcelona).

On 2012 it was announced that Agrolimen would be selling its 50% to Procter & Gamble for US$1 Billion.

On 2013 Procter & Gamble announced the absorption of the Arbora & Ausonia company into Procter & Gamble, closing their Barcelona headquarters but maintaining most of the remaining infrastructure.

== Brands and products ==
- Dodot, Kandoo and Charmin nappies and wipes
- Evax and Ausonia sanitary towels and panty liners
- Tampax tampons
- Ausonia Evolution, Lindor and Salvacamas products for urinary incontinence

== Corporate social responsibility ==
Through its brands Arbora & Ausonia offered society useful information on health at different stages of people's lives, and worked with specialists and professionals in different fields on projects such as "La adolescencia y tú" (Adolescence and you), run on a joint basis with the Child and Adolescent Gynaecology Group, an initiative of the Spanish Society of Gynaecology and Obstetrics (SEGO), a society with which the Women's Intimate Health Observatory has been developed.

== Other agreements and campaigns ==
- Dodot collaboration agreement with Unicef
- Ausonia and the Spanish Association Against Cancer (AECC) anti-breast cancer campaign
- Collaboration agreement with the Red Cross
