= Ausonia Mensa =

Martian geographical feature

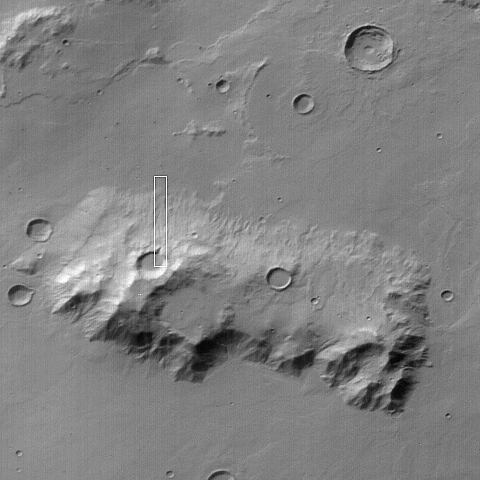
- Ausonia Mensa, as seen by MGS. This eroded mensa has many channels.
- Coordinates: 30.3°S 262.3°W
- Diameter: 103 km (64 mi)

Ausonia Mensa is a mensa in the Hellas quadrangle of Mars, located at 30.3° S and 262.3° W. It is 103 km (64 mi) across and was named after an albedo feature name. The term "mensa" is used for a flat-topped prominence with cliff-like edges. Ausonia Mensa has many small channels. Some features look like alluvial fans. These channels add to the mass of evidence that water once flowed on Mars. Images of curved channels have been seen in images from Mars spacecraft dating back to the early 1970s with the Mariner 9 orbiter.

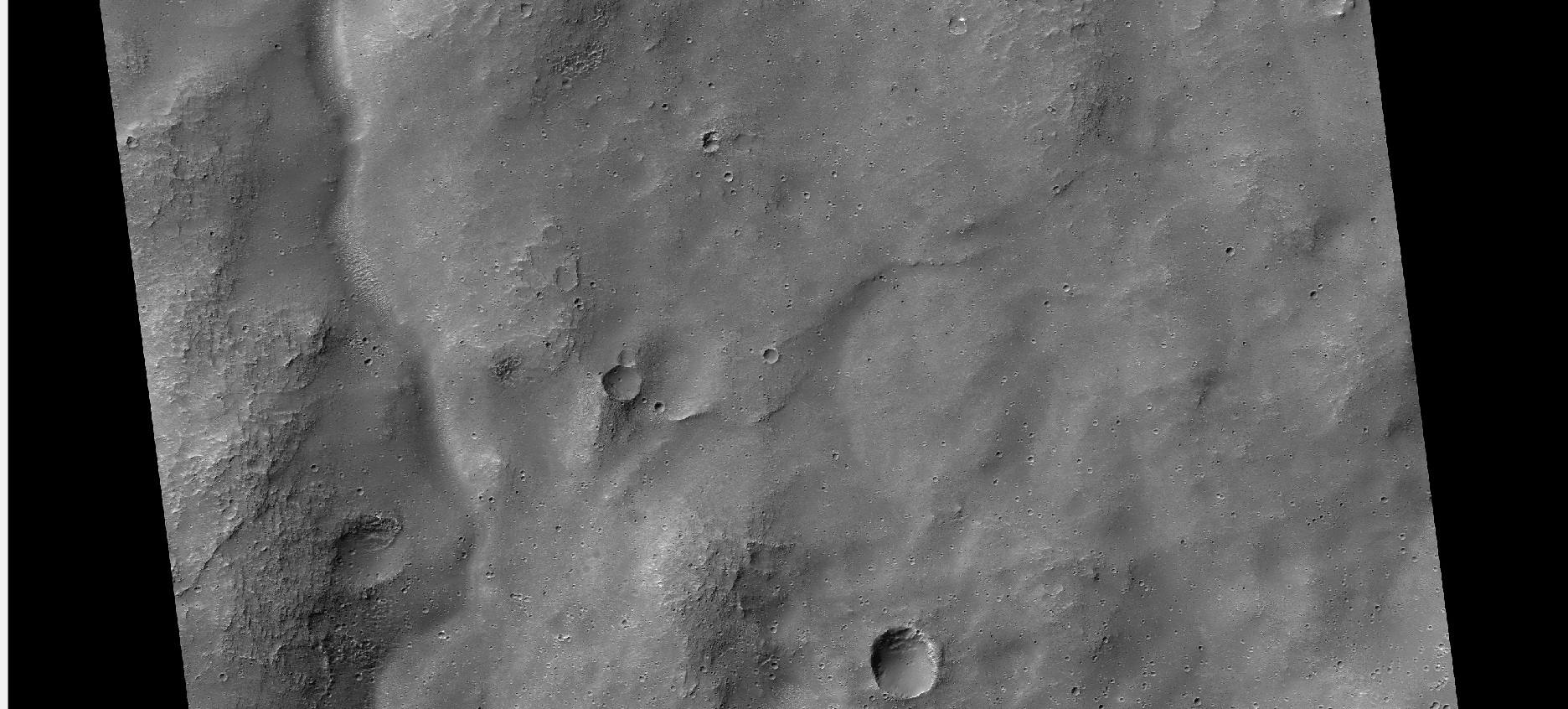
Channel in Ausonia Mensa, as seen by HiRISE under HiWish program

== See also ==
- HiRISE
- HiWish program
- MGS
- Valley networks (Mars)
