= Rosamond Langbridge =

Irish novelist, playwright and poet

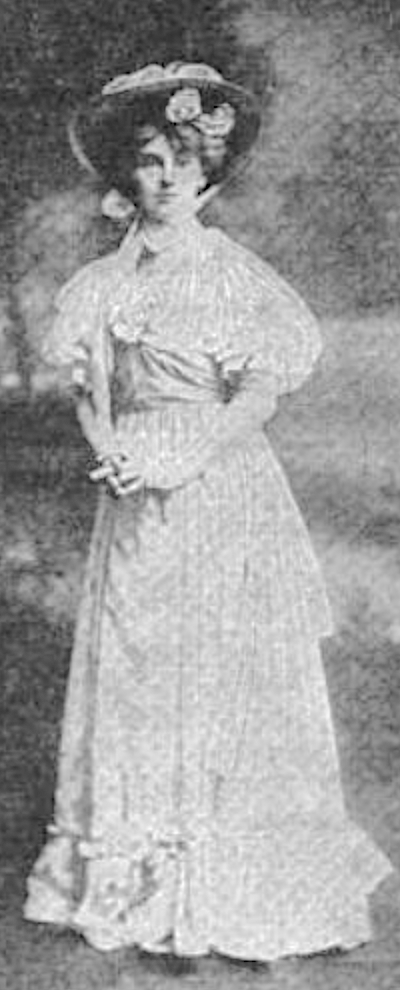
- Born: 1880; County Donegal, Ireland
- Died: 2 July 1964 (aged 83–84); Mersea, Essex, U.K.
- Occupation: Writer

Rosamond Grant Langbridge (1880 – 2 July 1964) was an Irish novelist, playwright and poet.

== Life ==
She was born at Glenalla, County Donegal, Ireland, the daughter of Rev. Frederick Langbridge, a writer, poet (The Scales of Heaven) and playwright (The Only Way). She was brought up and educated in Limerick, where her father was Rector of St. John's, until he resigned due to ill-health in 1921.

She married the writer J. S. Fletcher, with whom she had one child, Rev. Valentine Fletcher (1914–1993) who was himself a writer, author of various children's books and of Chimney Pots and Stacks, on the British domestic chimney pot. Langbridge contributed to newspapers such as The Manchester Guardian and the Saturday Westminster, amongst others. She died at Mersea, in Essex.

== Select bibliography ==
Among her novels are:

- The Flame and the Flood (1903)
- The Third Experiment (1904)
- Ambush of Young Days (1906)
- The Stars Beyond (1907)
- Imperial Richenda (1908)
- The Single Eye (1924)

Short stories:

- The Green Banks of Shannon (1929)

Plays:

- The Spell

Poetry:

- The White Moth and Other Poems (1932)

Non-fiction:

- Charlotte Brontë, a psychological study (1929)
