= Rosamund Stanhope =

British poet and teacher known for her use of esoteric and unusual words

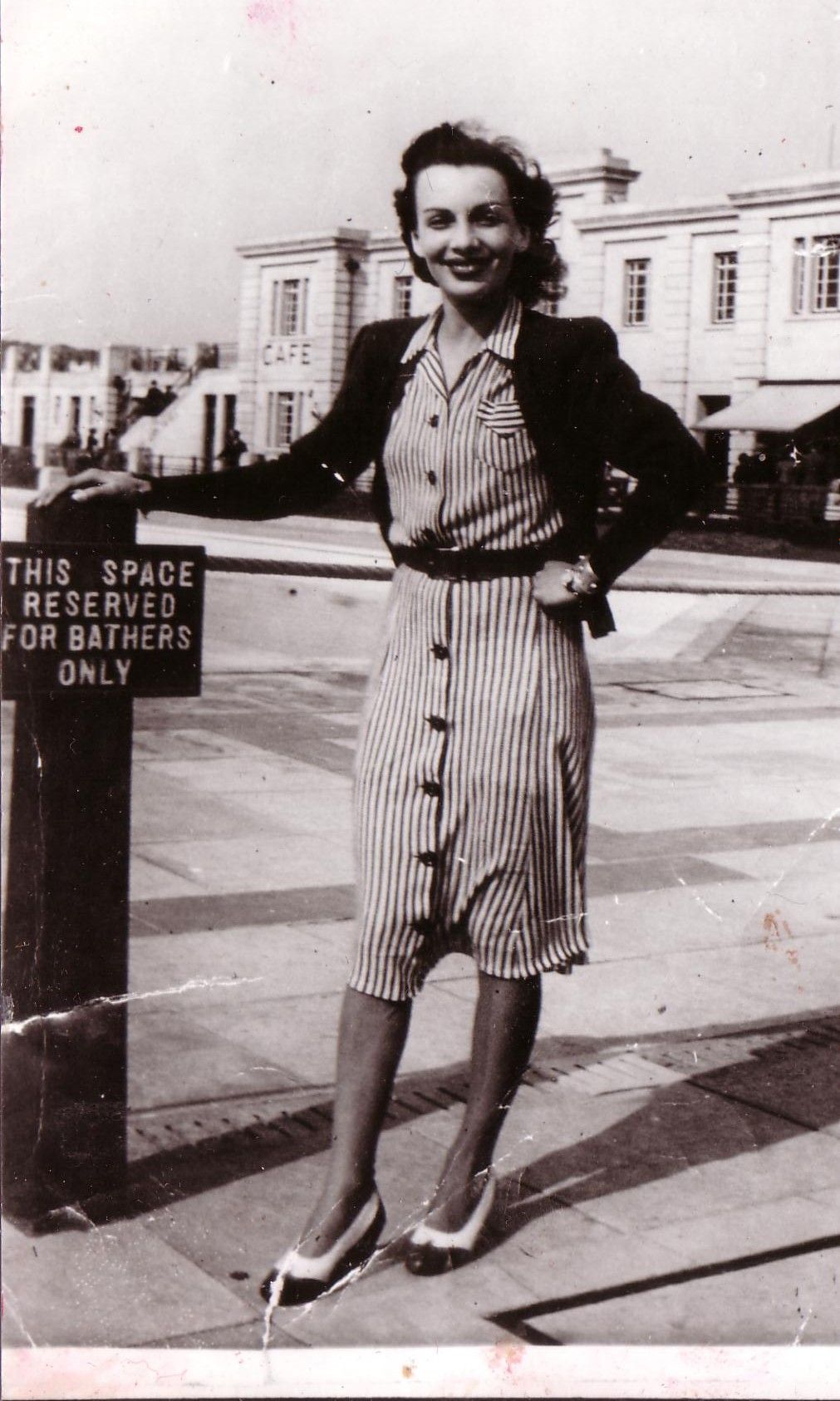
- c. 1947
- Born: Rosamund Steinberg; 4 March 1919; Northampton, East Midlands, United Kingdom
- Died: 7 December 2005 (aged 86)
- Citizenship: United Kingdom
- Education: Royal Central School of Speech & Drama; University of London
- Occupations: Poet; actress; secretary; teacher
- Children: 1
- Writing career
- Language: English
- Period: 1945–2001

Rosamund Stanhope (4 March 1919 – 7 December 2005) was a British poet and teacher known for her prolific use of esoteric and unusual words.

== Biography ==
Rosamund Stanhope was born on 4 March 1919 in Northampton as the daughter of a Latvian (German by adoption) leather merchant who changed his name after her birth from Steinberg to Stanhope. She grew up in a wealthy and distant British family setting, boarding at two independent schools. She trained as an actress at the Royal Central School of Speech & Drama, where she was taught by Elsie Fogerty, and embarked on her career at the Northgate Theatre, Exeter, but was diverted by the outbreak of the Second World War. She joined the Women's Royal Naval Service and spent the war working as a radio mechanic in Crail, Scotland. She subsequently worked for the BBC, in the Latin American dance band department, and after her marriage as secretary for Miron Grindea and his literary magazine ADAM International Review. After her daughter was born, she returned in 1952 to the Central School, where she retrained as a teacher.

As well as the three collections published between 1962 and 1992, Stanhope regularly had poems published in various literary and other magazines, such as the New Statesman, Time and Tide, The Times Literary Supplement, and The Anglo-Welsh Review. Her first collection was published in March 1962 by John Rolph at the Scorpion Press. The following year, in 1963, she completed an external degree in English from the University of London. In the same year, she broke her spine in an accident at her home. Partially paralysed and psychologically traumatised from the event, she was hospitalised for a string of related problems over 30 times between 1963 and 1969, and thereafter suffered chronic and intense pain. Additionally, she underwent a colostomy after an operation to remove colon cancer, during which her bladder was injured, resulting in further complications.

As well as working as a tutor for Wolsey Hall, a home schooling college, she maintained her teaching position for nearly two decades, finally retiring in 1987 at the age of 68, and continued writing, producing seven unpublished novels, written in the immediate aftermath of her accident, and numerous poems. Two collections of her poems were published by Peterloo Press; she also featured as the Poetry Review′s Poet of the Month. After decades of increasing debilitation, she died peacefully at her home on 7 December 2005.

In 2020, US publishing house Flood Editions republished So I Looked Down to Camelot with an afterword by poet and professor of literature Graham Foust. At this time Jennifer Moxley wrote of the book: "Rare is the poet who makes us see the visible world anew, but rarer still is she who uses her 'lace intelligence' to bend familiar English into a foreign tongue. Reading this astonishing book I fell in love with poetry again, which is, at its best, a 'difficult love.' Stanhope's poems clock the personhood of time, abstract the world, and concretize the mind. While reading I thought of Dickinson and Schuyler, I thought of H. D., of Blake and Coleridge, yet Stanhope is unique. Her poems give evidence (just in time) that though we be 'headcuffed in the gaol of day,' an 'unaccustomed thought' can still 'slip out of the galaxy.'"

== Published works ==
- So I looked down to Camelot (1962)
- Lapidary (1991)
- No Place for the Maudlin Heart (2001)
- So I looked down to Camelot (new edition, with afterword) (2020)
