= Christine Rosamond =

American painter

Rosamond
- Born: Christine Rosamond Presco; October 24, 1947; Oakland, California
- Died: March 26, 1994 (aged 46); Big Sur, California
- Known for: Painting, etching, lithography
- Spouse(s): Garth Benton; Richard Partlow
- Website: rosamond.com

Christine Rosamond (October 24, 1947 – March 26, 1994)—who became known by her middle name, Rosamond -- was an American artist made famous by her paintings, watercolors, etchings, lithographs, and acrylics. Born Christine Rosamond Presco in 1947, she is best known for her use of negative space and the predominance of women in her pictures. Some of Rosamond's most familiar pieces are "Blue Ice", "Autumn", and "Denim and Silk." At one time, Rosamond's public works sold in the millions. In the early 1970s, when Rosamond's name was a household word, it was extremely unusual for a woman to rise to this kind of prominence in the art scene.

== Early life ==
Rosamond was born in Vallejo, California to Victor and Rosemary Presco on October 24, 1947. Rosamond was the third of four children who grew up in an extremely dysfunctional household. Both parents were alcoholics who often failed to feed their children. All four children eventually became alcoholics themselves, though Rosamond and her brother John later joined Alcoholics Anonymous. John's artwork was chosen twice to tour the world in a Red Cross show, when he was thirteen, and again when he was sixteen. Rosamond and John were pioneers in the Hippie Movement. They lived in a famous commune with the daughters of Jirayr Zorthian, who has been titled "The Last Bohemian". After seeing the large portrait John did of his muse, Rena Easton, Rosamond took up art in 1972 to support herself and her young daughter, Shannon Rosamond.

== Career beginnings ==
John and his friend—and Rosamond's eventual lover—Bryan MacLean were the school artists at University High School in West Los Angeles. Bryan became a roadie for the Byrds when he was seventeen and would later play with the rock group Love. Bryan's father was an architect for the stars, and had designed Elizabeth Rosemond Taylor's home. Through him, Bryan knew the Hollywood crowd. In 1964, Rosamond accompanied her brother and Bryan on the Monday Night Art Walks on La Cienaga Boulevard, during which Rosamond learned much about art and galleries.

Attending minor art classes at UCLA, Rosamond saw her career begin to rise when her then-partner, Scott Hale, encouraged her to display her paintings at the 1972 Westwood Art Fair. Priscilla Presley bought one her works, which got the attention of gallery owner Ira Cohen. Ira purchased all of Rosamond's work and commissioned her to complete a painting for him on a weekly basis. Being a single mother, this was a hard contract to meet. Rosamond purchased a projector and according to her ex-husband, Garth Benton, employed images of models she cut out from fashion magazines, then broadcast them on empty canvas. Nevertheless, her immense talent, combined with the climate of the era and the 1970s feminist zeitgeist, had Rosamond selling millions of her paintings around the world. A Rosamond print was a symbol of affluence.

== Rise to fame ==
Though Rosamond saw massive success during her time working for Ira Cohen, she also felt as though her work was being devalued; she believed her art belonged in galleries and not simply on merchandise. In an attempt to elevate her work from poster to fine art, Rosamond began a working relationship with the art printer Jack Solomon, owner of Circle Gallery in San Francisco. Solomon commissioned painters for lithographs, and in this environment where Rosamond's art was not only appreciated but celebrated, she experienced her most meteoric rise to fame of her young career. For a brief period, she was known as "the most published artist in the world." She continued to paint and release images as lithographs under the banner of her company to keep artistic control. Rosamond spent four months in Paris, completing four new lithographs with the prestigious Atelier Mourlot.

Rosamond had a falling out with her brother John when he met her new husband, Richard Partlow, a Grammy-winning foley artist. After the failure of that marriage, Rosamond would later marry Garth Benton, cousin of the muralist and artist Thomas Hart Benton, who was the teacher and friend of Jackson Pollack.

== Death ==
Just weeks after Rosamond's last art expo in 1994, she was invited to stay in a famous home twenty miles south of Carmel at Rocky Point. As reported in the Carmel Pinecone, Rosamond had nightmares about a giant wave causing her demise. On March 26, 1994, Rosamond, her sister, Vicki Presco, her son, Shamus Dundon, and Christine's daughter, Drew Benton, were getting ready for a party that Stacey Pierrot was going to attend. The four were not exploring tide-pools, because there are none at Rocky Point. How Christine ended up in the ocean remains a mystery. The claim that a rogue wave, "unusual for that time of year", took her out to sea is unsupported. There is no season for rogue waves. Rosamond was 46, and was celebrating her first sober birthday. She was very protective of Drew, and due to her nightmares, would not let her near any large body of water. The person who invited her to stay at this home is not known.
