= 540 Rosamunde =

Asteroid in the Main Belt in the Solar system

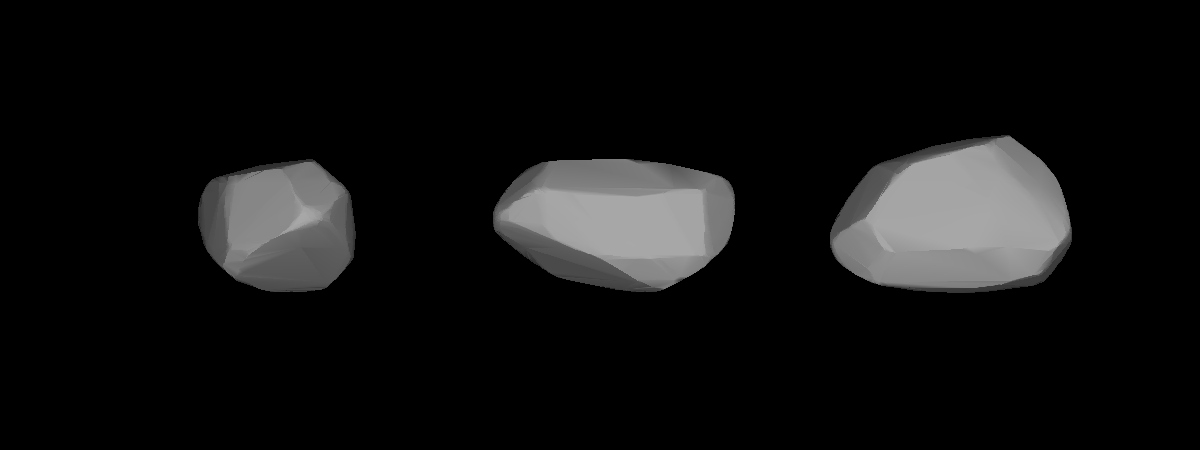
- A three-dimensional model of 540 Rosamunde based on its light curve

Discovery
- Discovered by: Max Wolf
- Discovery site: Heidelberg
- Discovery date: 3 August 1904

Designations
- Pronunciation: German: [ʁoːzɐˈmʊndə]
- Alternative designations: 1904 ON

Orbital characteristics
- Epoch 31 July 2016 (JD 2457600.5)
- Uncertainty parameter 0
- Observation arc: 111.67 yr (40788 d)
- Aphelion: 2.4178 AU (361.70 Gm)
- Perihelion: 2.0195 AU (302.11 Gm)
- Semi-major axis: 2.2187 AU (331.91 Gm)
- Eccentricity: 0.089767
- Orbital period (sidereal): 3.30 yr (1207.1 d)
- Mean anomaly: 85.2863°
- Mean motion: 0° 17^{m} 53.664^{s} / day
- Inclination: 5.5831°
- Longitude of ascending node: 202.174°
- Argument of perihelion: 337.564°

Physical characteristics
- Mean radius: 9.51±1.35 km
- Synodic rotation period: 9.351 ± 0.001 h (0.389625 ± 4.2×10^{−5} d)
- Geometric albedo: 0.2426±0.088
- Absolute magnitude (H): 10.76

540 Rosamunde is an S-type asteroid belonging to the Flora family in the Main Belt. Its diameter is about 19 km and it has an albedo of 0.243. Its rotation period is 9.336 hours.

Rosamunde is named for a character in a play of the same title for which Franz Schubert wrote incidental music.
