= List of minor planets: 1–1000 =

The following is a partial list of minor planets, running from minor-planet number 1 through 1000, inclusive. The primary data for this and other partial lists is based on JPL's "Small-Body Orbital Elements" and data available from the Minor Planet Center. Critical list information is also provided by the MPC, unless otherwise specified from Lowell Observatory. A detailed description of the table's columns and additional sources are given on the main page including a complete list of every page in this series, and a statistical break-up on the dynamical classification of minor planets.

Also see the summary list of all named bodies in numerical and alphabetical order, and the corresponding naming citations for the number range of this particular list. New namings may only be added to this list after official publication, as the preannouncement of names is condemned by the Working Group for Small Bodies Nomenclature of the International Astronomical Union.

Near-Earth obj.	MBA (inner)	MBA (outer)	Centaur
Mars-crosser	MBA (middle)	Jupiter trojan	Trans-Neptunian obj.
Unclassified

== 1–100 ==
Designation			Discovery			Properties		Ref
Permanent	Provisional	Named after	Date	Site	Discoverer(s)	Category	Diam.	Ref
1 Ceres	—	Ceres	January 1, 1801	Palermo	G. Piazzi	·	939 km (583 mi)	MPC · JPL
2 Pallas	—	Pallas	March 28, 1802	Bremen	H. W. Olbers	PAL	513 km (319 mi)	MPC · JPL
3 Juno	—	Juno	September 1, 1804	Sternwarte Lilienthal	K. Harding	JUN	247 km (153 mi)	MPC · JPL
4 Vesta	—	Vesta	March 29, 1807	Bremen	H. W. Olbers	V	523 km (325 mi)	MPC · JPL
5 Astraea	—	Astraea	December 8, 1845	Driesen	K. L. Hencke	(5)	107 km (66 mi)	MPC · JPL
6 Hebe	—	Hebe	July 1, 1847	Driesen	K. L. Hencke	PHO	185 km (115 mi)	MPC · JPL
7 Iris	—	Iris	August 13, 1847	London	J. R. Hind	·	200 km (120 mi)	MPC · JPL
8 Flora	—	Flora	October 18, 1847	London	J. R. Hind	·	147 km (91 mi)	MPC · JPL
9 Metis	—	Metis	April 25, 1848	Markree	A. Graham	·	190 km (120 mi)	MPC · JPL
10 Hygiea	—	Hygiea	April 12, 1849	Naples	A. de Gasparis	HYG	407 km (253 mi)	MPC · JPL
11 Parthenope	—	Parthenope	May 11, 1850	Naples	A. de Gasparis	·	143 km (89 mi)	MPC · JPL
12 Victoria	—	Victoria	September 13, 1850	London	J. R. Hind	·	115 km (71 mi)	MPC · JPL
13 Egeria	—	Egeria	November 2, 1850	Naples	A. de Gasparis	·	203 km (126 mi)	MPC · JPL
14 Irene	—	Irene	May 19, 1851	London	J. R. Hind	·	152 km (94 mi)	MPC · JPL
15 Eunomia	—	Eunomia	July 29, 1851	Naples	A. de Gasparis	EUN	232 km (144 mi)	MPC · JPL
16 Psyche	—	Psyche	March 17, 1852	Naples	A. de Gasparis	·	222 km (138 mi)	MPC · JPL
17 Thetis	—	Thetis	April 17, 1852	Düsseldorf	R. Luther	·	85 km (53 mi)	MPC · JPL
18 Melpomene	—	Melpomene	June 24, 1852	London	J. R. Hind	·	140 km (87 mi)	MPC · JPL
19 Fortuna	—	Fortuna	August 22, 1852	London	J. R. Hind	·	200 km (120 mi)	MPC · JPL
20 Massalia	—	Massalia	September 19, 1852	Naples	A. de Gasparis	MAS	136 km (85 mi)	MPC · JPL
21 Lutetia	—	Lutetia	November 15, 1852	Paris	H. Goldschmidt	·	98 km (61 mi)	MPC · JPL
22 Kalliope	—	Kalliope	November 16, 1852	London	J. R. Hind	moon	168 km (104 mi)	MPC · JPL
23 Thalia	—	Thalia	December 15, 1852	London	J. R. Hind	·	108 km (67 mi)	MPC · JPL
24 Themis	—	Themis	April 5, 1853	Naples	A. de Gasparis	THM	198 km (123 mi)	MPC · JPL
25 Phocaea	—	Phocaea	April 6, 1853	Marseilles	J. Chacornac	PHO	61 km (38 mi)	MPC · JPL
26 Proserpina	—	Proserpina	May 5, 1853	Düsseldorf	R. Luther	·	95 km (59 mi)	MPC · JPL
27 Euterpe	—	Euterpe	November 8, 1853	London	J. R. Hind	·	96 km (60 mi)	MPC · JPL
28 Bellona	—	Bellona	March 1, 1854	Düsseldorf	R. Luther	·	121 km (75 mi)	MPC · JPL
29 Amphitrite	—	Amphitrite	March 1, 1854	London	A. Marth	·	190 km (120 mi)	MPC · JPL
30 Urania	—	Urania	July 22, 1854	London	J. R. Hind	·	93 km (58 mi)	MPC · JPL
31 Euphrosyne	—	Euphrosyne	September 1, 1854	Washington	J. Ferguson	EUP · moon	267 km (166 mi)	MPC · JPL
32 Pomona	—	Pomona	October 26, 1854	Paris	H. Goldschmidt	·	81 km (50 mi)	MPC · JPL
33 Polyhymnia	—	Polyhymnia	October 28, 1854	Paris	J. Chacornac	·	53 km (33 mi)	MPC · JPL
34 Circe	—	Circe	April 6, 1855	Paris	J. Chacornac	·	133 km (83 mi)	MPC · JPL
35 Leukothea	—	Leukothea	April 19, 1855	Düsseldorf	R. Luther	·	103 km (64 mi)	MPC · JPL
36 Atalante	—	Atalante	October 5, 1855	Paris	H. Goldschmidt	·	133 km (83 mi)	MPC · JPL
37 Fides	—	Fides	October 5, 1855	Düsseldorf	R. Luther	·	108 km (67 mi)	MPC · JPL
38 Leda	—	Leda	January 12, 1856	Paris	J. Chacornac	·	92 km (57 mi)	MPC · JPL
39 Laetitia	—	Laetitia	February 8, 1856	Paris	J. Chacornac	·	179 km (111 mi)	MPC · JPL
40 Harmonia	—	Harmonia	March 31, 1856	Paris	H. Goldschmidt	·	111 km (69 mi)	MPC · JPL
41 Daphne	—	Daphne	May 22, 1856	Paris	H. Goldschmidt	moon	205 km (127 mi)	MPC · JPL
42 Isis	—	Isis	May 23, 1856	Oxford	N. R. Pogson	·	111 km (69 mi)	MPC · JPL
43 Ariadne	—	Ariadne	April 15, 1857	Oxford	N. R. Pogson	·	71 km (44 mi)	MPC · JPL
44 Nysa	—	Nysa	May 27, 1857	Paris	H. Goldschmidt	NYS	71 km (44 mi)	MPC · JPL
45 Eugenia	—	Eugenia	June 27, 1857	Paris	H. Goldschmidt	moon	202 km (126 mi)	MPC · JPL
46 Hestia	—	Hestia	August 16, 1857	Oxford	N. R. Pogson	·	131 km (81 mi)	MPC · JPL
47 Aglaja	—	Aglaja	September 15, 1857	Düsseldorf	R. Luther	·	168 km (104 mi)	MPC · JPL
48 Doris	—	Doris	September 19, 1857	Paris	H. Goldschmidt	·	216 km (134 mi)	MPC · JPL
49 Pales	—	Pales	September 19, 1857	Paris	H. Goldschmidt	·	166 km (103 mi)	MPC · JPL
50 Virginia	—	Virginia	October 4, 1857	Washington	J. Ferguson	·	84 km (52 mi)	MPC · JPL
51 Nemausa	—	Nemausa	January 22, 1858	Nîmes	J. J. P. Laurent	·	138 km (86 mi)	MPC · JPL
52 Europa	—	Europa	February 4, 1858	Paris	H. Goldschmidt	·	304 km (189 mi)	MPC · JPL
53 Kalypso	—	Kalypso	April 4, 1858	Düsseldorf	R. Luther	·	97 km (60 mi)	MPC · JPL
54 Alexandra	—	Alexandra	September 10, 1858	Paris	H. Goldschmidt	·	160 km (99 mi)	MPC · JPL
55 Pandora	—	Pandora	September 10, 1858	Albany	G. Searle	·	85 km (53 mi)	MPC · JPL
56 Melete	—	Melete	September 9, 1857	Paris	H. Goldschmidt	·	121 km (75 mi)	MPC · JPL
57 Mnemosyne	—	Mnemosyne	September 22, 1859	Düsseldorf	R. Luther	·	113 km (70 mi)	MPC · JPL
58 Concordia	—	Concordia	March 24, 1860	Düsseldorf	R. Luther	·	107 km (66 mi)	MPC · JPL
59 Elpis	—	Elpis	September 12, 1860	Paris	J. Chacornac	·	165 km (103 mi)	MPC · JPL
60 Echo	—	Echo	September 14, 1860	Washington	J. Ferguson	·	43 km (27 mi)	MPC · JPL
61 Danaë	—	Danaë	September 9, 1860	Paris	H. Goldschmidt	·	86 km (53 mi)	MPC · JPL
62 Erato	—	Erato	September 14, 1860	Berlin	O. Lesser, W. Foerster	THM	107 km (66 mi)	MPC · JPL
63 Ausonia	—	Ausonia	February 10, 1861	Naples	A. de Gasparis	V	116 km (72 mi)	MPC · JPL
64 Angelina	—	Angelina	March 4, 1861	Marseilles	E. W. Tempel	·	58 km (36 mi)	MPC · JPL
65 Cybele	—	Cybele	March 8, 1861	Marseilles	E. W. Tempel	CYB	237 km (147 mi)	MPC · JPL
66 Maja	—	Maja	April 9, 1861	Cambridge	H. P. Tuttle	·	72 km (45 mi)	MPC · JPL
67 Asia	—	Asia	April 17, 1861	Madras	N. R. Pogson	·	56 km (35 mi)	MPC · JPL
68 Leto	—	Leto	April 29, 1861	Düsseldorf	R. Luther	·	123 km (76 mi)	MPC · JPL
69 Hesperia	—	Hesperia	April 29, 1861	Milan	G. Schiaparelli	·	138 km (86 mi)	MPC · JPL
70 Panopaea	—	Panopaea	May 5, 1861	Paris	H. Goldschmidt	·	128 km (80 mi)	MPC · JPL
71 Niobe	—	Niobe	August 13, 1861	Düsseldorf	R. Luther	·	83 km (52 mi)	MPC · JPL
72 Feronia	—	Feronia	May 29, 1861	Clinton	C. H. F. Peters	·	75 km (47 mi)	MPC · JPL
73 Klytia	—	Klytia	April 7, 1862	Cambridge	H. P. Tuttle	·	45 km (28 mi)	MPC · JPL
74 Galatea	—	Galatea	August 29, 1862	Marseilles	E. W. Tempel	·	119 km (74 mi)	MPC · JPL
75 Eurydike	—	Eurydike	September 22, 1862	Clinton	C. H. F. Peters	·	62 km (39 mi)	MPC · JPL
76 Freia	—	Freia	October 21, 1862	Copenhagen Observatory	H. d'Arrest	CYB	145 km (90 mi)	MPC · JPL
77 Frigga	—	Frigga	November 12, 1862	Clinton	C. H. F. Peters	·	61 km (38 mi)	MPC · JPL
78 Diana	—	Diana	March 15, 1863	Düsseldorf	R. Luther	·	121 km (75 mi)	MPC · JPL
79 Eurynome	—	Eurynome	September 14, 1863	Ann Arbor	J. C. Watson	·	63 km (39 mi)	MPC · JPL
80 Sappho	—	Sappho	May 2, 1864	Madras	N. R. Pogson	·	69 km (43 mi)	MPC · JPL
81 Terpsichore	—	Terpsichore	September 30, 1864	Marseilles	E. W. Tempel	·	118 km (73 mi)	MPC · JPL
82 Alkmene	—	Alkmene	November 27, 1864	Düsseldorf	R. Luther	·	58 km (36 mi)	MPC · JPL
83 Beatrix	—	Beatrix	April 26, 1865	Naples	A. de Gasparis	·	111 km (69 mi)	MPC · JPL
84 Klio	—	Klio	August 25, 1865	Düsseldorf	R. Luther	·	79 km (49 mi)	MPC · JPL
85 Io	—	Io	September 19, 1865	Clinton	C. H. F. Peters	EUN ·	155 km (96 mi)	MPC · JPL
86 Semele	—	Semele	January 4, 1866	Berlin	F. Tietjen	·	110 km (68 mi)	MPC · JPL
87 Sylvia	—	Sylvia	May 16, 1866	Madras	N. R. Pogson	SYL · CYB · moon	253 km (157 mi)	MPC · JPL
88 Thisbe	—	Thisbe	June 15, 1866	Clinton	C. H. F. Peters	·	232 km (144 mi)	MPC · JPL
89 Julia	—	Julia	August 6, 1866	Marseilles	É. Stephan	·	145 km (90 mi)	MPC · JPL
90 Antiope	—	Antiope	October 1, 1866	Düsseldorf	R. Luther	THM · moon	116 km (72 mi)	MPC · JPL
91 Aegina	—	Aegina	November 4, 1866	Marseilles	É. Stephan	(5)	103 km (64 mi)	MPC · JPL
92 Undina	—	Undina	July 7, 1867	Clinton	C. H. F. Peters	·	126 km (78 mi)	MPC · JPL
93 Minerva	—	Minerva	August 24, 1867	Ann Arbor	J. C. Watson	GEF · moon ·	154 km (96 mi)	MPC · JPL
94 Aurora	—	Aurora	September 6, 1867	Ann Arbor	J. C. Watson	·	205 km (127 mi)	MPC · JPL
95 Arethusa	—	Arethusa	November 23, 1867	Düsseldorf	R. Luther	·	148 km (92 mi)	MPC · JPL
96 Aegle	—	Aegle	February 17, 1868	Marseilles	J. Coggia	AEG	178 km (111 mi)	MPC · JPL
97 Klotho	—	Klotho	February 17, 1868	Marseilles	E. W. Tempel	·	101 km (63 mi)	MPC · JPL
98 Ianthe	—	Ianthe	April 18, 1868	Clinton	C. H. F. Peters	·	133 km (83 mi)	MPC · JPL
99 Dike	—	Dike	May 28, 1868	Marseilles	A. Borrelly	·	67 km (42 mi)	MPC · JPL
100 Hekate	—	Hekate	July 11, 1868	Ann Arbor	J. C. Watson	HYG ·	86 km (53 mi)	MPC · JPL

== 101–200 ==
back to top

Designation			Discovery			Properties		Ref
Permanent	Provisional	Named after	Date	Site	Discoverer(s)	Category	Diam.	Ref
101 Helena	—	Helena	August 15, 1868	Ann Arbor	J. C. Watson	·	66 km (41 mi)	MPC · JPL
102 Miriam	—	Miriam	August 22, 1868	Clinton	C. H. F. Peters	·	83 km (52 mi)	MPC · JPL
103 Hera	—	Hera	September 7, 1868	Ann Arbor	J. C. Watson	·	84 km (52 mi)	MPC · JPL
104 Klymene	—	Klymene	September 13, 1868	Ann Arbor	J. C. Watson	THM	137 km (85 mi)	MPC · JPL
105 Artemis	—	Artemis	September 16, 1868	Ann Arbor	J. C. Watson	PHO	95 km (59 mi)	MPC · JPL
106 Dione	—	Dione	October 10, 1868	Ann Arbor	J. C. Watson	·	208 km (129 mi)	MPC · JPL
107 Camilla	—	Camilla	November 17, 1868	Madras	N. R. Pogson	CYB · moon	210 km (130 mi)	MPC · JPL
108 Hecuba	—	Hecuba	April 2, 1869	Düsseldorf	R. Luther	HYG ·	75 km (47 mi)	MPC · JPL
109 Felicitas	—	Felicitas	October 9, 1869	Clinton	C. H. F. Peters	·	83 km (52 mi)	MPC · JPL
110 Lydia	—	Lydia	April 19, 1870	Marseilles	A. Borrelly	PAD	86 km (53 mi)	MPC · JPL
111 Ate	—	Ate	August 14, 1870	Clinton	C. H. F. Peters	·	126 km (78 mi)	MPC · JPL
112 Iphigenia	—	Iphigenia	September 19, 1870	Clinton	C. H. F. Peters	·	70 km (43 mi)	MPC · JPL
113 Amalthea	—	Amalthea	March 12, 1871	Düsseldorf	R. Luther	·	50 km (31 mi)	MPC · JPL
114 Kassandra	—	Kassandra	July 23, 1871	Clinton	C. H. F. Peters	·	94 km (58 mi)	MPC · JPL
115 Thyra	—	Thyra	August 6, 1871	Ann Arbor	J. C. Watson	·	80 km (50 mi)	MPC · JPL
116 Sirona	—	Sirona	September 8, 1871	Clinton	C. H. F. Peters	·	72 km (45 mi)	MPC · JPL
117 Lomia	—	Lomia	September 12, 1871	Marseilles	A. Borrelly	·	209 km (130 mi)	MPC · JPL
118 Peitho	—	Peitho	March 15, 1872	Düsseldorf	R. Luther	·	40 km (25 mi)	MPC · JPL
119 Althaea	—	Althaea	April 3, 1872	Ann Arbor	J. C. Watson	·	57 km (35 mi)	MPC · JPL
120 Lachesis	—	Lachesis	April 10, 1872	Marseilles	A. Borrelly	·	155 km (96 mi)	MPC · JPL
121 Hermione	—	Hermione	May 12, 1872	Ann Arbor	J. C. Watson	CYB · moon	209 km (130 mi)	MPC · JPL
122 Gerda	—	Gerda	July 31, 1872	Clinton	C. H. F. Peters	·	71 km (44 mi)	MPC · JPL
123 Brunhild	—	Brunhild	July 31, 1872	Clinton	C. H. F. Peters	·	45 km (28 mi)	MPC · JPL
124 Alkeste	—	Alkeste	August 23, 1872	Clinton	C. H. F. Peters	·	89 km (55 mi)	MPC · JPL
125 Liberatrix	—	Liberatrix	September 11, 1872	Paris	P. M. Henry	·	48 km (30 mi)	MPC · JPL
126 Velleda	—	Velleda	November 5, 1872	Paris	P. P. Henry	·	45 km (28 mi)	MPC · JPL
127 Johanna	—	Johanna	November 5, 1872	Paris	P. M. Henry	·	122 km (76 mi)	MPC · JPL
128 Nemesis	—	Nemesis	November 25, 1872	Ann Arbor	J. C. Watson	·	163 km (101 mi)	MPC · JPL
129 Antigone	—	Antigone	February 5, 1873	Clinton	C. H. F. Peters	·	113 km (70 mi)	MPC · JPL
130 Elektra	—	Elektra	February 17, 1873	Clinton	C. H. F. Peters	moon	181 km (112 mi)	MPC · JPL
131 Vala	—	Vala	May 24, 1873	Clinton	C. H. F. Peters	·	31 km (19 mi)	MPC · JPL
132 Aethra	—	Aethra	June 13, 1873	Ann Arbor	J. C. Watson	·	43 km (27 mi)	MPC · JPL
133 Cyrene	—	Cyrene	August 16, 1873	Ann Arbor	J. C. Watson	·	72 km (45 mi)	MPC · JPL
134 Sophrosyne	—	Sophrosyne	September 27, 1873	Düsseldorf	R. Luther	·	108 km (67 mi)	MPC · JPL
135 Hertha	—	Hertha	February 18, 1874	Clinton	C. H. F. Peters	NYS	79 km (49 mi)	MPC · JPL
136 Austria	—	Austria	March 18, 1874	Pola	J. Palisa	·	37 km (23 mi)	MPC · JPL
137 Meliboea	—	Meliboea	April 21, 1874	Pula	J. Palisa	·	129 km (80 mi)	MPC · JPL
138 Tolosa	—	Tolosa	May 19, 1874	Toulouse	J. Perrotin	·	53 km (33 mi)	MPC · JPL
139 Juewa	—	Juewa	October 10, 1874	Beijing	J. C. Watson	·	151 km (94 mi)	MPC · JPL
140 Siwa	—	Siwa	October 13, 1874	Pola	J. Palisa	·	110 km (68 mi)	MPC · JPL
141 Lumen	—	Lumen	January 13, 1875	Paris	P. P. Henry	·	118 km (73 mi)	MPC · JPL
142 Polana	—	Polana	January 28, 1875	Pola	J. Palisa	NYS	55 km (34 mi)	MPC · JPL
143 Adria	—	Adria	February 23, 1875	Pula	J. Palisa	·	95 km (59 mi)	MPC · JPL
144 Vibilia	—	Vibilia	June 3, 1875	Clinton	C. H. F. Peters	·	142 km (88 mi)	MPC · JPL
145 Adeona	—	Adeona	June 3, 1875	Clinton	C. H. F. Peters	ADE	128 km (80 mi)	MPC · JPL
146 Lucina	—	Lucina	June 8, 1875	Marseilles	A. Borrelly	·	160 km (99 mi)	MPC · JPL
147 Protogeneia	—	Protogeneia	July 10, 1875	Vienna	L. Schulhof	·	133 km (83 mi)	MPC · JPL
148 Gallia	—	Gallia	August 7, 1875	Paris	P. M. Henry	GAL	98 km (61 mi)	MPC · JPL
149 Medusa	—	Medusa	September 21, 1875	Toulouse	J. Perrotin	·	24 km (15 mi)	MPC · JPL
150 Nuwa	—	Nuwa	October 18, 1875	Ann Arbor	J. C. Watson	·	119 km (74 mi)	MPC · JPL
151 Abundantia	—	Abundantia	November 1, 1875	Pola	J. Palisa	·	39 km (24 mi)	MPC · JPL
152 Atala	—	Atala	November 2, 1875	Paris	P. P. Henry	·	59 km (37 mi)	MPC · JPL
153 Hilda	—	Hilda	November 2, 1875	Pola	J. Palisa	HIL · 3:2	171 km (106 mi)	MPC · JPL
154 Bertha	—	Bertha	November 4, 1875	Paris	P. M. Henry	·	193 km (120 mi)	MPC · JPL
155 Scylla	—	Scylla	November 8, 1875	Pola	J. Palisa	·	40 km (25 mi)	MPC · JPL
156 Xanthippe	—	Xanthippe	November 22, 1875	Pula	J. Palisa	·	143 km (89 mi)	MPC · JPL
157 Dejanira	—	Dejanira	December 1, 1875	Marseilles	A. Borrelly	·	20 km (12 mi)	MPC · JPL
158 Koronis	—	Koronis	January 4, 1876	Berlin	V. Knorre	KOR	39 km (24 mi)	MPC · JPL
159 Aemilia	—	Aemilia	January 26, 1876	Paris	P. P. Henry	(159)	125 km (78 mi)	MPC · JPL
160 Una	—	Una	February 20, 1876	Clinton	C. H. F. Peters	·	81 km (50 mi)	MPC · JPL
161 Athor	—	Athor	April 19, 1876	Ann Arbor	J. C. Watson	·	41 km (25 mi)	MPC · JPL
162 Laurentia	—	Laurentia	April 21, 1876	Paris	P. M. Henry	·	97 km (60 mi)	MPC · JPL
163 Erigone	—	Erigone	April 26, 1876	Toulouse	J. Perrotin	ERI	82 km (51 mi)	MPC · JPL
164 Eva	—	Eva	July 12, 1876	Paris	P. P. Henry	·	100 km (62 mi)	MPC · JPL
165 Loreley	—	Loreley	August 9, 1876	Clinton	C. H. F. Peters	·	180 km (110 mi)	MPC · JPL
166 Rhodope	—	Rhodope	August 15, 1876	Clinton	C. H. F. Peters	ADE	52 km (32 mi)	MPC · JPL
167 Urda	—	Urda	August 28, 1876	Clinton	C. H. F. Peters	KOR	40 km (25 mi)	MPC · JPL
168 Sibylla	—	Sibylla	September 28, 1876	Ann Arbor	J. C. Watson	CYB	145 km (90 mi)	MPC · JPL
169 Zelia	—	Zelia	September 28, 1876	Paris	P. M. Henry	·	38 km (24 mi)	MPC · JPL
170 Maria	—	Maria	January 10, 1877	Toulouse	J. Perrotin	MAR	33 km (21 mi)	MPC · JPL
171 Ophelia	—	Ophelia	January 13, 1877	Marseilles	A. Borrelly	THM	131 km (81 mi)	MPC · JPL
172 Baucis	—	Baucis	February 5, 1877	Marseilles	A. Borrelly	·	62 km (39 mi)	MPC · JPL
173 Ino	—	Ino	August 1, 1877	Marseilles	A. Borrelly	EUN	126 km (78 mi)	MPC · JPL
174 Phaedra	—	Phaedra	September 2, 1877	Ann Arbor	J. C. Watson	·	65 km (40 mi)	MPC · JPL
175 Andromache	—	Andromache	October 1, 1877	Ann Arbor	J. C. Watson	·	95 km (59 mi)	MPC · JPL
176 Iduna	—	Iduna	October 14, 1877	Clinton	C. H. F. Peters	·	107 km (66 mi)	MPC · JPL
177 Irma	—	Irma	November 5, 1877	Paris	P. P. Henry	·	69 km (43 mi)	MPC · JPL
178 Belisana	—	Belisana	November 6, 1877	Pola	J. Palisa	·	36 km (22 mi)	MPC · JPL
179 Klytaemnestra	—	Klytaemnestra	November 11, 1877	Ann Arbor	J. C. Watson	TEL	70 km (43 mi)	MPC · JPL
180 Garumna	—	Garumna	January 29, 1878	Toulouse	J. Perrotin	·	23 km (14 mi)	MPC · JPL
181 Eucharis	—	Eucharis	February 2, 1878	Marseilles	P. Cottenot	·	115 km (71 mi)	MPC · JPL
182 Elsa	—	Elsa	February 7, 1878	Pola	J. Palisa	·	40 km (25 mi)	MPC · JPL
183 Istria	—	Istria	February 8, 1878	Pula	J. Palisa	·	33 km (21 mi)	MPC · JPL
184 Dejopeja	—	Dejopeja	February 28, 1878	Pula	J. Palisa	·	62 km (39 mi)	MPC · JPL
185 Eunike	—	Eunike	March 1, 1878	Clinton	C. H. F. Peters	·	160 km (99 mi)	MPC · JPL
186 Celuta	—	Celuta	April 6, 1878	Paris	P. M. Henry	PHO	50 km (31 mi)	MPC · JPL
187 Lamberta	—	Lamberta	April 11, 1878	Marseilles	J. Coggia	·	147 km (91 mi)	MPC · JPL
188 Menippe	—	Menippe	June 18, 1878	Clinton	C. H. F. Peters	·	36 km (22 mi)	MPC · JPL
189 Phthia	—	Phthia	September 9, 1878	Clinton	C. H. F. Peters	·	38 km (24 mi)	MPC · JPL
190 Ismene	—	Ismene	September 22, 1878	Clinton	C. H. F. Peters	3:2	159 km (99 mi)	MPC · JPL
191 Kolga	—	Kolga	September 30, 1878	Clinton	C. H. F. Peters	·	95 km (59 mi)	MPC · JPL
192 Nausikaa	—	Nausikaa	February 17, 1879	Pola	J. Palisa	·	99 km (62 mi)	MPC · JPL
193 Ambrosia	—	Ambrosia	February 28, 1879	Marseilles	J. Coggia	·	26 km (16 mi)	MPC · JPL
194 Prokne	—	Prokne	March 21, 1879	Clinton	C. H. F. Peters	(194)	162 km (101 mi)	MPC · JPL
195 Eurykleia	—	Eurykleia	April 19, 1879	Pola	J. Palisa	·	93 km (58 mi)	MPC · JPL
196 Philomela	—	Philomela	May 14, 1879	Clinton	C. H. F. Peters	·	145 km (90 mi)	MPC · JPL
197 Arete	—	Arete	May 21, 1879	Pola	J. Palisa	·	32 km (20 mi)	MPC · JPL
198 Ampella	—	Ampella	June 13, 1879	Marseilles	A. Borrelly	·	54 km (34 mi)	MPC · JPL
199 Byblis	—	Byblis	July 9, 1879	Clinton	C. H. F. Peters	·	76 km (47 mi)	MPC · JPL
200 Dynamene	—	Dynamene	July 27, 1879	Clinton	C. H. F. Peters	·	128 km (80 mi)	MPC · JPL

== 201–300 ==
back to top

Designation			Discovery			Properties		Ref
Permanent	Provisional	Named after	Date	Site	Discoverer(s)	Category	Diam.	Ref
201 Penelope	—	Penelope	August 7, 1879	Pola	J. Palisa	·	86 km (53 mi)	MPC · JPL
202 Chryseïs	—	Chryseïs	September 11, 1879	Clinton	C. H. F. Peters	·	86 km (53 mi)	MPC · JPL
203 Pompeja	—	Pompeja	September 25, 1879	Clinton	C. H. F. Peters	·	125 km (78 mi)	MPC · JPL
204 Kallisto	—	Kallisto	October 8, 1879	Pula	J. Palisa	·	49 km (30 mi)	MPC · JPL
205 Martha	—	Martha	October 13, 1879	Pula	J. Palisa	·	77 km (48 mi)	MPC · JPL
206 Hersilia	—	Hersilia	October 13, 1879	Clinton	C. H. F. Peters	·	113 km (70 mi)	MPC · JPL
207 Hedda	—	Hedda	October 17, 1879	Pula	J. Palisa	·	58 km (36 mi)	MPC · JPL
208 Lacrimosa	—	Lacrimosa	October 21, 1879	Pula	J. Palisa	KOR	40 km (25 mi)	MPC · JPL
209 Dido	—	Dido	October 22, 1879	Clinton	C. H. F. Peters	·	179 km (111 mi)	MPC · JPL
210 Isabella	—	Isabella	November 12, 1879	Pula	J. Palisa	·	87 km (54 mi)	MPC · JPL
211 Isolda	—	Isolda	December 10, 1879	Pula	J. Palisa	·	141 km (88 mi)	MPC · JPL
212 Medea	—	Medea	February 6, 1880	Pula	J. Palisa	·	136 km (85 mi)	MPC · JPL
213 Lilaea	—	Lilaea	February 16, 1880	Clinton	C. H. F. Peters	·	82 km (51 mi)	MPC · JPL
214 Aschera	—	Aschera	February 29, 1880	Pula	J. Palisa	·	25 km (16 mi)	MPC · JPL
215 Oenone	—	Oenone	April 7, 1880	Berlin	V. Knorre	·	35 km (22 mi)	MPC · JPL
216 Kleopatra	—	Kleopatra	April 10, 1880	Pula	J. Palisa	moon	122 km (76 mi)	MPC · JPL
217 Eudora	—	Eudora	August 30, 1880	Marseilles	J. Coggia	·	65 km (40 mi)	MPC · JPL
218 Bianca	—	Bianca	September 4, 1880	Pula	J. Palisa	·	61 km (38 mi)	MPC · JPL
219 Thusnelda	—	Thusnelda	September 30, 1880	Pula	J. Palisa	·	38 km (24 mi)	MPC · JPL
220 Stephania	—	Stephania	May 19, 1881	Vienna	J. Palisa	·	32 km (20 mi)	MPC · JPL
221 Eos	—	Eos	January 18, 1882	Vienna	J. Palisa	EOS	95 km (59 mi)	MPC · JPL
222 Lucia	—	Lucia	February 9, 1882	Vienna	J. Palisa	THM ·	55 km (34 mi)	MPC · JPL
223 Rosa	—	Rosa	March 9, 1882	Vienna	J. Palisa	THM	80 km (50 mi)	MPC · JPL
224 Oceana	—	Oceana	March 30, 1882	Vienna	J. Palisa	·	58 km (36 mi)	MPC · JPL
225 Henrietta	—	Henrietta	April 19, 1882	Vienna	J. Palisa	T_{j} (2.99) · CYB	96 km (60 mi)	MPC · JPL
226 Weringia	—	Weringia	July 19, 1882	Vienna	J. Palisa	·	31 km (19 mi)	MPC · JPL
227 Philosophia	—	Philosophia	August 12, 1882	Paris	P. P. Henry	·	124 km (77 mi)	MPC · JPL
228 Agathe	—	Agathe	August 19, 1882	Vienna	J. Palisa	·	9.3 km (5.8 mi)	MPC · JPL
229 Adelinda	—	Adelinda	August 22, 1882	Vienna	J. Palisa	CYB	106 km (66 mi)	MPC · JPL
230 Athamantis	—	Athamantis	September 3, 1882	Bothkamp	K. de Ball	·	111 km (69 mi)	MPC · JPL
231 Vindobona	—	Vindobona	September 10, 1882	Vienna	J. Palisa	·	74 km (46 mi)	MPC · JPL
232 Russia	—	Russia	January 31, 1883	Vienna	J. Palisa	·	55 km (34 mi)	MPC · JPL
233 Asterope	—	Asterope	May 11, 1883	Marseilles	A. Borrelly	·	100 km (62 mi)	MPC · JPL
234 Barbara	—	Barbara	August 12, 1883	Clinton	C. H. F. Peters	PHO	45 km (28 mi)	MPC · JPL
235 Carolina	—	Carolina	November 28, 1883	Vienna	J. Palisa	·	58 km (36 mi)	MPC · JPL
236 Honoria	—	Honoria	April 26, 1884	Vienna	J. Palisa	·	78 km (48 mi)	MPC · JPL
237 Coelestina	—	Coelestina	June 27, 1884	Vienna	J. Palisa	·	41 km (25 mi)	MPC · JPL
238 Hypatia	—	Hypatia	July 1, 1884	Berlin	V. Knorre	·	156 km (97 mi)	MPC · JPL
239 Adrastea	—	Adrastea	August 18, 1884	Vienna	J. Palisa	·	38 km (24 mi)	MPC · JPL
240 Vanadis	—	Vanadis	August 27, 1884	Marseilles	A. Borrelly	·	88 km (55 mi)	MPC · JPL
241 Germania	—	Germania	September 12, 1884	Düsseldorf	R. Luther	·	169 km (105 mi)	MPC · JPL
242 Kriemhild	—	Kriemhild	September 22, 1884	Vienna	J. Palisa	·	41 km (25 mi)	MPC · JPL
243 Ida	—	Ida	September 29, 1884	Vienna	J. Palisa	KOR · moon	32 km (20 mi)	MPC · JPL
244 Sita	—	Sita	October 14, 1884	Vienna	J. Palisa	slow	11 km (6.8 mi)	MPC · JPL
245 Vera	—	Vera	February 6, 1885	Madras	N. R. Pogson	·	76 km (47 mi)	MPC · JPL
246 Asporina	—	Asporina	March 6, 1885	Marseilles	A. Borrelly	·	51 km (32 mi)	MPC · JPL
247 Eukrate	—	Eukrate	March 14, 1885	Düsseldorf	R. Luther	·	131 km (81 mi)	MPC · JPL
248 Lameia	—	Lameia	June 5, 1885	Vienna	J. Palisa	·	50 km (31 mi)	MPC · JPL
249 Ilse	—	Ilse	August 16, 1885	Clinton	C. H. F. Peters	·	35 km (22 mi)	MPC · JPL
250 Bettina	—	Bettina	September 3, 1885	Vienna	J. Palisa	·	121 km (75 mi)	MPC · JPL
251 Sophia	—	Sophia	October 4, 1885	Vienna	J. Palisa	EOS	27 km (17 mi)	MPC · JPL
252 Clementina	—	Clementina	October 11, 1885	Nice	J. Perrotin	·	65 km (40 mi)	MPC · JPL
253 Mathilde	—	Mathilde	November 12, 1885	Vienna	J. Palisa	slow	53 km (33 mi)	MPC · JPL
254 Augusta	—	Augusta	March 31, 1886	Vienna	J. Palisa	(254)	12 km (7.5 mi)	MPC · JPL
255 Oppavia	—	Oppavia	March 31, 1886	Vienna	J. Palisa	GEF ·	57 km (35 mi)	MPC · JPL
256 Walpurga	—	Walpurga	April 3, 1886	Vienna	J. Palisa	·	67 km (42 mi)	MPC · JPL
257 Silesia	—	Silesia	April 5, 1886	Vienna	J. Palisa	·	73 km (45 mi)	MPC · JPL
258 Tyche	—	Tyche	May 4, 1886	Düsseldorf	R. Luther	EUN	65 km (40 mi)	MPC · JPL
259 Aletheia	—	Aletheia	June 28, 1886	Clinton	C. H. F. Peters	·	174 km (108 mi)	MPC · JPL
260 Huberta	—	Huberta	October 3, 1886	Vienna	J. Palisa	(260) · CYB	102 km (63 mi)	MPC · JPL
261 Prymno	—	Prymno	October 31, 1886	Clinton	C. H. F. Peters	·	50 km (31 mi)	MPC · JPL
262 Valda	—	Valda	November 3, 1886	Vienna	J. Palisa	·	15 km (9.3 mi)	MPC · JPL
263 Dresda	—	Dresda	November 3, 1886	Vienna	J. Palisa	KOR	24 km (15 mi)	MPC · JPL
264 Libussa	—	Libussa	December 22, 1886	Clinton	C. H. F. Peters	·	63 km (39 mi)	MPC · JPL
265 Anna	—	Anna	February 25, 1887	Vienna	J. Palisa	·	23 km (14 mi)	MPC · JPL
266 Aline	—	Aline	May 17, 1887	Vienna	J. Palisa	·	109 km (68 mi)	MPC · JPL
267 Tirza	—	Tirza	May 27, 1887	Nice	A. Charlois	·	56 km (35 mi)	MPC · JPL
268 Adorea	—	Adorea	June 8, 1887	Marseilles	A. Borrelly	THM	145 km (90 mi)	MPC · JPL
269 Justitia	—	Justitia	September 21, 1887	Vienna	J. Palisa	·	51 km (32 mi)	MPC · JPL
270 Anahita	—	Anahita	October 8, 1887	Clinton	C. H. F. Peters	·	51 km (32 mi)	MPC · JPL
271 Penthesilea	—	Penthesilea	October 13, 1887	Berlin	V. Knorre	·	66 km (41 mi)	MPC · JPL
272 Antonia	—	Antonia	February 4, 1888	Nice	A. Charlois	·	27 km (17 mi)	MPC · JPL
273 Atropos	—	Atropos	March 8, 1888	Vienna	J. Palisa	PHO	30 km (19 mi)	MPC · JPL
274 Philagoria	—	Philagoria	April 3, 1888	Vienna	J. Palisa	·	27 km (17 mi)	MPC · JPL
275 Sapientia	—	Sapientia	April 15, 1888	Vienna	J. Palisa	·	103 km (64 mi)	MPC · JPL
276 Adelheid	—	Adelheid	April 17, 1888	Vienna	J. Palisa	·	115 km (71 mi)	MPC · JPL
277 Elvira	—	Elvira	May 3, 1888	Nice	A. Charlois	KOR	30 km (19 mi)	MPC · JPL
278 Paulina	—	Paulina	May 16, 1888	Vienna	J. Palisa	·	33 km (21 mi)	MPC · JPL
279 Thule	—	Thule	October 25, 1888	Vienna	J. Palisa	4:3	127 km (79 mi)	MPC · JPL
280 Philia	—	Philia	October 29, 1888	Vienna	J. Palisa	·	46 km (29 mi)	MPC · JPL
281 Lucretia	—	Lucretia	October 31, 1888	Vienna	J. Palisa	·	11 km (6.8 mi)	MPC · JPL
282 Clorinde	—	Clorinde	January 28, 1889	Nice	A. Charlois	·	39 km (24 mi)	MPC · JPL
283 Emma	—	Emma	February 8, 1889	Nice	A. Charlois	EMA · moon	132 km (82 mi)	MPC · JPL
284 Amalia	—	Amalia	May 29, 1889	Nice	A. Charlois	·	53 km (33 mi)	MPC · JPL
285 Regina	—	Regina	August 3, 1889	Nice	A. Charlois	·	47 km (29 mi)	MPC · JPL
286 Iclea	—	Iclea	August 3, 1889	Vienna	J. Palisa	·	94 km (58 mi)	MPC · JPL
287 Nephthys	—	Nephthys	August 25, 1889	Clinton	C. H. F. Peters	·	60 km (37 mi)	MPC · JPL
288 Glauke	—	Glauke	February 20, 1890	Düsseldorf	R. Luther	slow	29 km (18 mi)	MPC · JPL
289 Nenetta	—	Nenetta	March 10, 1890	Nice	A. Charlois	·	38 km (24 mi)	MPC · JPL
290 Bruna	—	Bruna	March 20, 1890	Vienna	J. Palisa	PHO	9.8 km (6.1 mi)	MPC · JPL
291 Alice	—	Alice	April 25, 1890	Vienna	J. Palisa	·	10 km (6.2 mi)	MPC · JPL
292 Ludovica	—	Ludovica	April 25, 1890	Vienna	J. Palisa	·	31 km (19 mi)	MPC · JPL
293 Brasilia	—	Brasilia	May 20, 1890	Nice	A. Charlois	BRA	57 km (35 mi)	MPC · JPL
294 Felicia	—	Felicia	July 15, 1890	Nice	A. Charlois	·	52 km (32 mi)	MPC · JPL
295 Theresia	—	Theresia	August 17, 1890	Vienna	J. Palisa	·	28 km (17 mi)	MPC · JPL
296 Phaëtusa	—	Phaëtusa	August 19, 1890	Nice	A. Charlois	·	8.2 km (5.1 mi)	MPC · JPL
297 Caecilia	—	Caecilia	September 9, 1890	Nice	A. Charlois	·	39 km (24 mi)	MPC · JPL
298 Baptistina	—	Baptistina	September 9, 1890	Nice	A. Charlois	BAP	21 km (13 mi)	MPC · JPL
299 Thora	—	Thora	October 6, 1890	Vienna	J. Palisa	slow	16 km (9.9 mi)	MPC · JPL
300 Geraldina	—	Geraldina	October 3, 1890	Nice	A. Charlois	·	67 km (42 mi)	MPC · JPL

== 301–400 ==
back to top

Designation			Discovery			Properties		Ref
Permanent	Provisional	Named after	Date	Site	Discoverer(s)	Category	Diam.	Ref
301 Bavaria	—	Bavaria	November 16, 1890	Vienna	J. Palisa	·	53 km (33 mi)	MPC · JPL
302 Clarissa	—	Clarissa	November 14, 1890	Nice	A. Charlois	CLA	39 km (24 mi)	MPC · JPL
303 Josephina	—	Josephina	February 12, 1891	Rome	E. Millosevich	·	125 km (78 mi)	MPC · JPL
304 Olga	—	Olga	February 14, 1891	Vienna	J. Palisa	PHO	66 km (41 mi)	MPC · JPL
305 Gordonia	—	Gordonia	February 16, 1891	Nice	A. Charlois	·	48 km (30 mi)	MPC · JPL
306 Unitas	—	Unitas	March 1, 1891	Rome	E. Millosevich	·	47 km (29 mi)	MPC · JPL
307 Nike	—	Nike	March 5, 1891	Nice	A. Charlois	·	61 km (38 mi)	MPC · JPL
308 Polyxo	—	Polyxo	March 31, 1891	Marseilles	A. Borrelly	·	129 km (80 mi)	MPC · JPL
309 Fraternitas	—	Fraternitas	April 6, 1891	Vienna	J. Palisa	·	41 km (25 mi)	MPC · JPL
310 Margarita	—	Margarita	May 16, 1891	Nice	A. Charlois	·	34 km (21 mi)	MPC · JPL
311 Claudia	—	Claudia	June 11, 1891	Nice	A. Charlois	KOR	26 km (16 mi)	MPC · JPL
312 Pierretta	—	Pierretta	August 28, 1891	Nice	A. Charlois	·	46 km (29 mi)	MPC · JPL
313 Chaldaea	—	Chaldaea	August 30, 1891	Vienna	J. Palisa	·	71 km (44 mi)	MPC · JPL
314 Rosalia	—	Rosalia	September 1, 1891	Nice	A. Charlois	·	61 km (38 mi)	MPC · JPL
315 Constantia	—	Constantia	September 4, 1891	Vienna	J. Palisa	·	6.5 km (4.0 mi)	MPC · JPL
316 Goberta	—	Goberta	September 8, 1891	Nice	A. Charlois	THM	56 km (35 mi)	MPC · JPL
317 Roxane	—	Roxane	September 11, 1891	Nice	A. Charlois	moon	19 km (12 mi)	MPC · JPL
318 Magdalena	—	Magdalena	September 24, 1891	Nice	A. Charlois	·	85 km (53 mi)	MPC · JPL
319 Leona	—	Leona	October 8, 1891	Nice	A. Charlois	CYB · slow	50 km (31 mi)	MPC · JPL
320 Katharina	—	Katharina	October 11, 1891	Vienna	J. Palisa	EOS	23 km (14 mi)	MPC · JPL
321 Florentina	—	Florentina	October 15, 1891	Vienna	J. Palisa	KOR ·	28 km (17 mi)	MPC · JPL
322 Phaeo	—	Phaeo	November 27, 1891	Marseilles	A. Borrelly	·	70 km (43 mi)	MPC · JPL
323 Brucia	—	Brucia	December 22, 1891	Heidelberg	M. F. Wolf	PHO	28 km (17 mi)	MPC · JPL
324 Bamberga	—	Bamberga	February 25, 1892	Vienna	J. Palisa	·	221 km (137 mi)	MPC · JPL
325 Heidelberga	—	Heidelberga	March 4, 1892	Heidelberg	M. F. Wolf	·	76 km (47 mi)	MPC · JPL
326 Tamara	—	Tamara	March 19, 1892	Vienna	J. Palisa	PHO	93 km (58 mi)	MPC · JPL
327 Columbia	—	Columbia	March 22, 1892	Nice	A. Charlois	·	30 km (19 mi)	MPC · JPL
328 Gudrun	—	Gudrun	March 18, 1892	Heidelberg	M. F. Wolf	·	146 km (91 mi)	MPC · JPL
329 Svea	—	Svea	March 21, 1892	Heidelberg	M. F. Wolf	PHO	81 km (50 mi)	MPC · JPL
330 Adalberta	A910 CB	Adalberta	February 2, 1910	Heidelberg	M. F. Wolf	·	9.1 km (5.7 mi)	MPC · JPL
331 Etheridgea	—	Etheridgea	April 1, 1892	Nice	A. Charlois	·	75 km (47 mi)	MPC · JPL
332 Siri	—	Siri	March 19, 1892	Heidelberg	M. F. Wolf	·	40 km (25 mi)	MPC · JPL
333 Badenia	1892 A	Badenia	August 22, 1892	Heidelberg	M. F. Wolf	·	72 km (45 mi)	MPC · JPL
334 Chicago	1892 L	Chicago	August 23, 1892	Heidelberg	M. F. Wolf	3:2	199 km (124 mi)	MPC · JPL
335 Roberta	1892 C	Roberta	September 1, 1892	Heidelberg	A. Staus	·	97 km (60 mi)	MPC · JPL
336 Lacadiera	1892 D	Lacadiera	September 19, 1892	Nice	A. Charlois	·	63 km (39 mi)	MPC · JPL
337 Devosa	1892 E	Devosa	September 22, 1892	Nice	A. Charlois	·	65 km (40 mi)	MPC · JPL
338 Budrosa	1892 F	Budrosa	September 25, 1892	Nice	A. Charlois	·	51 km (32 mi)	MPC · JPL
339 Dorothea	1892 G	Dorothea	September 25, 1892	Heidelberg	M. F. Wolf	EOS	44 km (27 mi)	MPC · JPL
340 Eduarda	1892 H	Eduarda	September 25, 1892	Heidelberg	M. F. Wolf	·	28 km (17 mi)	MPC · JPL
341 California	1892 J	California	September 25, 1892	Heidelberg	M. F. Wolf	slow	16 km (9.9 mi)	MPC · JPL
342 Endymion	1892 K	Endymion	October 17, 1892	Heidelberg	M. F. Wolf	·	64 km (40 mi)	MPC · JPL
343 Ostara	1892 N	Ostara	November 15, 1892	Heidelberg	M. F. Wolf	slow	18 km (11 mi)	MPC · JPL
344 Desiderata	1892 M	Desiderata	November 15, 1892	Nice	A. Charlois	·	124 km (77 mi)	MPC · JPL
345 Tercidina	1892 O	Tercidina	November 23, 1892	Nice	A. Charlois	·	90 km (56 mi)	MPC · JPL
346 Hermentaria	1892 P	Hermentaria	November 25, 1892	Nice	A. Charlois	·	86 km (53 mi)	MPC · JPL
347 Pariana	1892 Q	Pariana	November 28, 1892	Nice	A. Charlois	·	49 km (30 mi)	MPC · JPL
348 May	1892 R	May	November 28, 1892	Nice	A. Charlois	·	83 km (52 mi)	MPC · JPL
349 Dembowska	1892 T	Dembowska	December 9, 1892	Nice	A. Charlois	·	140 km (87 mi)	MPC · JPL
350 Ornamenta	1892 U	Ornamenta	December 14, 1892	Nice	A. Charlois	·	129 km (80 mi)	MPC · JPL
351 Yrsa	1892 V	Yrsa	December 16, 1892	Heidelberg	M. F. Wolf	·	40 km (25 mi)	MPC · JPL
352 Gisela	1893 B	Gisela	January 12, 1893	Heidelberg	M. F. Wolf	·	27 km (17 mi)	MPC · JPL
353 Ruperto-Carola	1893 F	Ruperto-Carola	January 16, 1893	Heidelberg	M. F. Wolf	·	14 km (8.7 mi)	MPC · JPL
354 Eleonora	1893 A	Eleonora	January 17, 1893	Nice	A. Charlois	·	149 km (93 mi)	MPC · JPL
355 Gabriella	1893 E	Gabriella	January 20, 1893	Nice	A. Charlois	(5)	24 km (15 mi)	MPC · JPL
356 Liguria	1893 G	Liguria	January 21, 1893	Nice	A. Charlois	·	146 km (91 mi)	MPC · JPL
357 Ninina	1893 J	Ninina	February 11, 1893	Nice	A. Charlois	·	124 km (77 mi)	MPC · JPL
358 Apollonia	1893 K	Apollonia	March 8, 1893	Nice	A. Charlois	·	90 km (56 mi)	MPC · JPL
359 Georgia	1893 M	Georgia	March 10, 1893	Nice	A. Charlois	·	44 km (27 mi)	MPC · JPL
360 Carlova	1893 N	Carlova	March 11, 1893	Nice	A. Charlois	·	129 km (80 mi)	MPC · JPL
361 Bononia	1893 P	Bononia	March 11, 1893	Nice	A. Charlois	T_{j} (2.98) · 3:2	154 km (96 mi)	MPC · JPL
362 Havnia	1893 R	Havnia	March 12, 1893	Nice	A. Charlois	·	98 km (61 mi)	MPC · JPL
363 Padua	1893 S	Padua	March 17, 1893	Nice	A. Charlois	PAD	97 km (60 mi)	MPC · JPL
364 Isara	1893 T	Isara	March 19, 1893	Nice	A. Charlois	·	26 km (16 mi)	MPC · JPL
365 Corduba	1893 V	Corduba	March 21, 1893	Nice	A. Charlois	·	87 km (54 mi)	MPC · JPL
366 Vincentina	1893 W	Vincentina	March 21, 1893	Nice	A. Charlois	·	86 km (53 mi)	MPC · JPL
367 Amicitia	1893 AA	Amicitia	May 19, 1893	Nice	A. Charlois	·	21 km (13 mi)	MPC · JPL
368 Haidea	1893 AB	Haidea	May 19, 1893	Nice	A. Charlois	·	69 km (43 mi)	MPC · JPL
369 Aëria	1893 AE	Aëria	July 4, 1893	Marseilles	A. Borrelly	·	74 km (46 mi)	MPC · JPL
370 Modestia	1893 AC	Modestia	July 14, 1893	Nice	A. Charlois	·	38 km (24 mi)	MPC · JPL
371 Bohemia	1893 AD	Bohemia	July 16, 1893	Nice	A. Charlois	·	53 km (33 mi)	MPC · JPL
372 Palma	1893 AH	Palma	August 19, 1893	Nice	A. Charlois	·	174 km (108 mi)	MPC · JPL
373 Melusina	1893 AJ	Melusina	September 15, 1893	Nice	A. Charlois	·	99 km (62 mi)	MPC · JPL
374 Burgundia	1893 AK	Burgundia	September 18, 1893	Nice	A. Charlois	·	45 km (28 mi)	MPC · JPL
375 Ursula	1893 AL	Ursula	September 18, 1893	Nice	A. Charlois	URS	216 km (134 mi)	MPC · JPL
376 Geometria	1893 AM	Geometria	September 18, 1893	Nice	A. Charlois	·	35 km (22 mi)	MPC · JPL
377 Campania	1893 AN	Campania	September 20, 1893	Nice	A. Charlois	·	90 km (56 mi)	MPC · JPL
378 Holmia	1893 AP	Holmia	December 6, 1893	Nice	A. Charlois	·	28 km (17 mi)	MPC · JPL
379 Huenna	1894 AQ	Huenna	January 8, 1894	Nice	A. Charlois	THM · moon	85 km (53 mi)	MPC · JPL
380 Fiducia	1894 AR	Fiducia	January 8, 1894	Nice	A. Charlois	·	68 km (42 mi)	MPC · JPL
381 Myrrha	1894 AS	Myrrha	January 10, 1894	Nice	A. Charlois	·	128 km (80 mi)	MPC · JPL
382 Dodona	1894 AT	Dodona	January 29, 1894	Nice	A. Charlois	·	65 km (40 mi)	MPC · JPL
383 Janina	1894 AU	Janina	January 29, 1894	Nice	A. Charlois	THM ·	43 km (27 mi)	MPC · JPL
384 Burdigala	1894 AV	Burdigala	February 11, 1894	Bordeaux	F. Courty	slow	34 km (21 mi)	MPC · JPL
385 Ilmatar	1894 AX	Ilmatar	March 1, 1894	Heidelberg	M. F. Wolf	·	86 km (53 mi)	MPC · JPL
386 Siegena	1894 AY	Siegena	March 1, 1894	Heidelberg	M. F. Wolf	·	165 km (103 mi)	MPC · JPL
387 Aquitania	1894 AZ	Aquitania	March 5, 1894	Bordeaux	F. Courty	·	101 km (63 mi)	MPC · JPL
388 Charybdis	1894 BA	Charybdis	March 7, 1894	Nice	A. Charlois	·	126 km (78 mi)	MPC · JPL
389 Industria	1894 BB	Industria	March 8, 1894	Nice	A. Charlois	·	74 km (46 mi)	MPC · JPL
390 Alma	1894 BC	Alma	March 24, 1894	Paris	G. Bigourdan	·	26 km (16 mi)	MPC · JPL
391 Ingeborg	1894 BE	Ingeborg	November 1, 1894	Heidelberg	M. F. Wolf	·	16 km (9.9 mi)	MPC · JPL
392 Wilhelmina	1894 BF	Wilhelmina	November 4, 1894	Heidelberg	M. F. Wolf	·	61 km (38 mi)	MPC · JPL
393 Lampetia	1894 BG	Lampetia	November 4, 1894	Heidelberg	M. F. Wolf	·	116 km (72 mi)	MPC · JPL
394 Arduina	1894 BH	Arduina	November 19, 1894	Marseilles	A. Borrelly	·	30 km (19 mi)	MPC · JPL
395 Delia	1894 BK	Delia	November 30, 1894	Nice	A. Charlois	·	44 km (27 mi)	MPC · JPL
396 Aeolia	1894 BL	Aeolia	December 1, 1894	Nice	A. Charlois	AEO	39 km (24 mi)	MPC · JPL
397 Vienna	1894 BM	Vienna	December 19, 1894	Nice	A. Charlois	·	49 km (30 mi)	MPC · JPL
398 Admete	1894 BN	Admete	December 28, 1894	Nice	A. Charlois	·	50 km (31 mi)	MPC · JPL
399 Persephone	1895 BP	Persephone	February 23, 1895	Heidelberg	M. F. Wolf	·	40 km (25 mi)	MPC · JPL
400 Ducrosa	1895 BU	Ducrosa	March 15, 1895	Nice	A. Charlois	·	36 km (22 mi)	MPC · JPL

== 401–500 ==
back to top

Designation			Discovery			Properties		Ref
Permanent	Provisional	Named after	Date	Site	Discoverer(s)	Category	Diam.	Ref
401 Ottilia	1895 BT	Ottilia	March 16, 1895	Heidelberg	M. F. Wolf	CYB	88 km (55 mi)	MPC · JPL
402 Chloë	1895 BW	Chloë	March 21, 1895	Nice	A. Charlois	·	55 km (34 mi)	MPC · JPL
403 Cyane	1895 BX	Cyane	May 18, 1895	Nice	A. Charlois	·	54 km (34 mi)	MPC · JPL
404 Arsinoë	1895 BY	Arsinoë	June 20, 1895	Nice	A. Charlois	·	95 km (59 mi)	MPC · JPL
405 Thia	1895 BZ	Thia	July 23, 1895	Nice	A. Charlois	·	109 km (68 mi)	MPC · JPL
406 Erna	1895 CB	Erna	August 22, 1895	Nice	A. Charlois	·	46 km (29 mi)	MPC · JPL
407 Arachne	1895 CC	Arachne	October 13, 1895	Heidelberg	M. F. Wolf	·	95 km (59 mi)	MPC · JPL
408 Fama	1895 CD	Fama	October 13, 1895	Heidelberg	M. F. Wolf	slow	36 km (22 mi)	MPC · JPL
409 Aspasia	1895 CE	Aspasia	December 9, 1895	Nice	A. Charlois	·	171 km (106 mi)	MPC · JPL
410 Chloris	1896 CH	Chloris	January 7, 1896	Nice	A. Charlois	CLO	119 km (74 mi)	MPC · JPL
411 Xanthe	1896 CJ	Xanthe	January 7, 1896	Nice	A. Charlois	·	77 km (48 mi)	MPC · JPL
412 Elisabetha	1896 CK	Elisabetha	January 7, 1896	Heidelberg	M. F. Wolf	·	96 km (60 mi)	MPC · JPL
413 Edburga	1896 CL	Edburga	January 7, 1896	Heidelberg	M. F. Wolf	·	34 km (21 mi)	MPC · JPL
414 Liriope	1896 CN	Liriope	January 16, 1896	Nice	A. Charlois	CYB	89 km (55 mi)	MPC · JPL
415 Palatia	1896 CO	Palatia	February 7, 1896	Heidelberg	M. F. Wolf	·	84 km (52 mi)	MPC · JPL
416 Vaticana	1896 CS	Vaticana	May 4, 1896	Nice	A. Charlois	·	85 km (53 mi)	MPC · JPL
417 Suevia	1896 CT	Suevia	May 6, 1896	Heidelberg	M. F. Wolf	·	55 km (34 mi)	MPC · JPL
418 Alemannia	1896 CV	Alemannia	September 7, 1896	Heidelberg	M. F. Wolf	·	40 km (25 mi)	MPC · JPL
419 Aurelia	1896 CW	Aurelia	September 7, 1896	Heidelberg	M. F. Wolf	·	149 km (93 mi)	MPC · JPL
420 Bertholda	1896 CY	Bertholda	September 7, 1896	Heidelberg	M. F. Wolf	CYB	139 km (86 mi)	MPC · JPL
421 Zähringia	1896 CZ	Zähringia	September 7, 1896	Heidelberg	M. F. Wolf	·	14 km (8.7 mi)	MPC · JPL
422 Berolina	1896 DA	Berolina	October 8, 1896	Urania	G. Witt	·	11 km (6.8 mi)	MPC · JPL
423 Diotima	1896 DB	Diotima	December 7, 1896	Nice	A. Charlois	EOS	176 km (109 mi)	MPC · JPL
424 Gratia	1896 DF	Gratia	December 31, 1896	Nice	A. Charlois	·	103 km (64 mi)	MPC · JPL
425 Cornelia	1896 DC	Cornelia	December 28, 1896	Nice	A. Charlois	·	68 km (42 mi)	MPC · JPL
426 Hippo	1897 DH	Hippo	August 25, 1897	Nice	A. Charlois	·	138 km (86 mi)	MPC · JPL
427 Galene	1897 DJ	Galene	August 27, 1897	Nice	A. Charlois	·	32 km (20 mi)	MPC · JPL
428 Monachia	1897 DK	Monachia	November 18, 1897	Munich	W. Villiger	·	20 km (12 mi)	MPC · JPL
429 Lotis	1897 DL	Lotis	November 23, 1897	Nice	A. Charlois	·	70 km (43 mi)	MPC · JPL
430 Hybris	1897 DM	Hybris	December 18, 1897	Nice	A. Charlois	·	32 km (20 mi)	MPC · JPL
431 Nephele	1897 DN	Nephele	December 18, 1897	Nice	A. Charlois	THM	102 km (63 mi)	MPC · JPL
432 Pythia	1897 DO	Pythia	December 18, 1897	Nice	A. Charlois	PHO	47 km (29 mi)	MPC · JPL
433 Eros	1898 DQ	Eros	August 13, 1898	Urania	G. Witt	AMO +1 km (0.62 mi)	17 km (11 mi)	MPC · JPL
434 Hungaria	1898 DR	Hungaria	September 11, 1898	Heidelberg	M. F. Wolf	H	8.9 km (5.5 mi)	MPC · JPL
435 Ella	1898 DS	Ella	September 11, 1898	Heidelberg	M. F. Wolf, A. Schwassmann	·	35 km (22 mi)	MPC · JPL
436 Patricia	1898 DT	Patricia	September 13, 1898	Heidelberg	M. F. Wolf, A. Schwassmann	·	59 km (37 mi)	MPC · JPL
437 Rhodia	1898 DP	Rhodia	July 16, 1898	Nice	A. Charlois	slow	13 km (8.1 mi)	MPC · JPL
438 Zeuxo	1898 DU	Zeuxo	November 8, 1898	Nice	A. Charlois	·	59 km (37 mi)	MPC · JPL
439 Ohio	1898 EB	Ohio	October 13, 1898	Mount Hamilton	E. F. Coddington	·	70 km (43 mi)	MPC · JPL
440 Theodora	1898 EC	Theodora	October 13, 1898	Mount Hamilton	E. F. Coddington	·	14 km (8.7 mi)	MPC · JPL
441 Bathilde	1898 ED	Bathilde	December 8, 1898	Nice	A. Charlois	·	65 km (40 mi)	MPC · JPL
442 Eichsfeldia	1899 EE	Eichsfeldia	February 15, 1899	Heidelberg	M. F. Wolf, A. Schwassmann	·	62 km (39 mi)	MPC · JPL
443 Photographica	1899 EF	Photographica	February 17, 1899	Heidelberg	M. F. Wolf, A. Schwassmann	·	26 km (16 mi)	MPC · JPL
444 Gyptis	1899 EL	Gyptis	March 31, 1899	Marseilles	J. Coggia	·	159 km (99 mi)	MPC · JPL
445 Edna	1899 EX	Edna	October 2, 1899	Mount Hamilton	E. F. Coddington	·	88 km (55 mi)	MPC · JPL
446 Aeternitas	1899 ER	Aeternitas	October 27, 1899	Heidelberg	M. F. Wolf, A. Schwassmann	·	54 km (34 mi)	MPC · JPL
447 Valentine	1899 ES	Valentine	October 27, 1899	Heidelberg	M. F. Wolf, A. Schwassmann	·	85 km (53 mi)	MPC · JPL
448 Natalie	1899 ET	Natalie	October 27, 1899	Heidelberg	M. F. Wolf, A. Schwassmann	·	51 km (32 mi)	MPC · JPL
449 Hamburga	1899 EU	Hamburga	October 31, 1899	Heidelberg	M. F. Wolf, A. Schwassmann	·	86 km (53 mi)	MPC · JPL
450 Brigitta	1899 EV	Brigitta	October 10, 1899	Heidelberg	M. F. Wolf, A. Schwassmann	EOS	37 km (23 mi)	MPC · JPL
451 Patientia	1899 EY	Patientia	December 4, 1899	Nice	A. Charlois	·	254 km (158 mi)	MPC · JPL
452 Hamiltonia	1899 FD	Hamiltonia	December 6, 1899	Mount Hamilton	J. E. Keeler	KOR	12 km (7.5 mi)	MPC · JPL
453 Tea	1900 FA	Tea	February 22, 1900	Nice	A. Charlois	·	24 km (15 mi)	MPC · JPL
454 Mathesis	1900 FC	Mathesis	March 28, 1900	Heidelberg	A. Schwassmann	·	82 km (51 mi)	MPC · JPL
455 Bruchsalia	1900 FG	Bruchsalia	May 22, 1900	Heidelberg	M. F. Wolf, A. Schwassmann	·	89 km (55 mi)	MPC · JPL
456 Abnoba	1900 FH	Abnoba	June 4, 1900	Heidelberg	M. F. Wolf, A. Schwassmann	·	38 km (24 mi)	MPC · JPL
457 Alleghenia	1900 FJ	Alleghenia	September 15, 1900	Heidelberg	M. F. Wolf, A. Schwassmann	·	19 km (12 mi)	MPC · JPL
458 Hercynia	1900 FK	Hercynia	September 21, 1900	Heidelberg	M. F. Wolf, A. Schwassmann	·	37 km (23 mi)	MPC · JPL
459 Signe	1900 FM	Signe	October 22, 1900	Heidelberg	M. F. Wolf	·	26 km (16 mi)	MPC · JPL
460 Scania	1900 FN	Scania	October 22, 1900	Heidelberg	M. F. Wolf	slow	20 km (12 mi)	MPC · JPL
461 Saskia	1900 FP	Saskia	October 22, 1900	Heidelberg	M. F. Wolf	THM	44 km (27 mi)	MPC · JPL
462 Eriphyla	1900 FQ	Eriphyla	October 22, 1900	Heidelberg	M. F. Wolf	KOR	34 km (21 mi)	MPC · JPL
463 Lola	1900 FS	Lola	October 31, 1900	Heidelberg	M. F. Wolf	PHO	21 km (13 mi)	MPC · JPL
464 Megaira	1901 FV	Megaira	January 9, 1901	Heidelberg	M. F. Wolf	·	77 km (48 mi)	MPC · JPL
465 Alekto	1901 FW	Alekto	January 13, 1901	Heidelberg	M. F. Wolf	·	73 km (45 mi)	MPC · JPL
466 Tisiphone	1901 FX	Tisiphone	January 17, 1901	Heidelberg	M. F. Wolf, L. Carnera	CYB	95 km (59 mi)	MPC · JPL
467 Laura	1901 FY	Laura	January 9, 1901	Heidelberg	M. F. Wolf	·	39 km (24 mi)	MPC · JPL
468 Lina	1901 FZ	Lina	January 18, 1901	Heidelberg	M. F. Wolf	THM	60 km (37 mi)	MPC · JPL
469 Argentina	1901 GE	Argentina	February 20, 1901	Heidelberg	L. Carnera	·	134 km (83 mi)	MPC · JPL
470 Kilia	1901 GJ	Kilia	April 21, 1901	Heidelberg	L. Carnera	slow	28 km (17 mi)	MPC · JPL
471 Papagena	1901 GN	Papagena	June 7, 1901	Heidelberg	M. F. Wolf	·	148 km (92 mi)	MPC · JPL
472 Roma	1901 GP	Roma	July 11, 1901	Heidelberg	L. Carnera	MAR	50 km (31 mi)	MPC · JPL
473 Nolli	1901 GC	Nolli	February 13, 1901	Heidelberg	M. F. Wolf	EUN	12 km (7.5 mi)	MPC · JPL
474 Prudentia	1901 GD	Prudentia	February 13, 1901	Heidelberg	M. F. Wolf	·	41 km (25 mi)	MPC · JPL
475 Ocllo	1901 HN	Ocllo	August 14, 1901	Arequipa	D. Stewart	·	18 km (11 mi)	MPC · JPL
476 Hedwig	1901 GQ	Hedwig	August 17, 1901	Heidelberg	L. Carnera	·	138 km (86 mi)	MPC · JPL
477 Italia	1901 GR	Italia	August 23, 1901	Heidelberg	L. Carnera	·	23 km (14 mi)	MPC · JPL
478 Tergeste	1901 GU	Tergeste	September 21, 1901	Heidelberg	L. Carnera	·	81 km (50 mi)	MPC · JPL
479 Caprera	1901 HJ	Caprera	November 12, 1901	Heidelberg	L. Carnera	·	60 km (37 mi)	MPC · JPL
480 Hansa	1901 GL	Hansa	May 21, 1901	Heidelberg	M. F. Wolf, L. Carnera	HNS	56 km (35 mi)	MPC · JPL
481 Emita	1902 HP	Emita	February 12, 1902	Heidelberg	L. Carnera	·	102 km (63 mi)	MPC · JPL
482 Petrina	1902 HT	Petrina	March 3, 1902	Heidelberg	M. F. Wolf	·	46 km (29 mi)	MPC · JPL
483 Seppina	1902 HU	Seppina	March 4, 1902	Heidelberg	M. F. Wolf	CYB	67 km (42 mi)	MPC · JPL
484 Pittsburghia	1902 HX	Pittsburghia	April 29, 1902	Heidelberg	M. F. Wolf	·	30 km (19 mi)	MPC · JPL
485 Genua	1902 HZ	Genua	May 7, 1902	Heidelberg	L. Carnera	·	64 km (40 mi)	MPC · JPL
486 Cremona	1902 JB	Cremona	May 11, 1902	Heidelberg	L. Carnera	·	23 km (14 mi)	MPC · JPL
487 Venetia	1902 JL	Venetia	July 9, 1902	Heidelberg	L. Carnera	·	59 km (37 mi)	MPC · JPL
488 Kreusa	1902 JG	Kreusa	June 26, 1902	Heidelberg	M. F. Wolf, L. Carnera	·	168 km (104 mi)	MPC · JPL
489 Comacina	1902 JM	Comacina	September 2, 1902	Heidelberg	L. Carnera	·	139 km (86 mi)	MPC · JPL
490 Veritas	1902 JP	Veritas	September 3, 1902	Heidelberg	M. F. Wolf	VER	119 km (74 mi)	MPC · JPL
491 Carina	1902 JQ	Carina	September 3, 1902	Heidelberg	M. F. Wolf	·	91 km (57 mi)	MPC · JPL
492 Gismonda	1902 JR	Gismonda	September 3, 1902	Heidelberg	M. F. Wolf	THM	53 km (33 mi)	MPC · JPL
493 Griseldis	1902 JS	Griseldis	September 7, 1902	Heidelberg	M. F. Wolf	·	42 km (26 mi)	MPC · JPL
494 Virtus	1902 JV	Virtus	October 7, 1902	Heidelberg	M. F. Wolf	·	101 km (63 mi)	MPC · JPL
495 Eulalia	1902 KG	Eulalia	October 25, 1902	Heidelberg	M. F. Wolf	·	37 km (23 mi)	MPC · JPL
496 Gryphia	1902 KH	Gryphia	October 25, 1902	Heidelberg	M. F. Wolf	slow	14 km (8.7 mi)	MPC · JPL
497 Iva	1902 KJ	Iva	November 4, 1902	Heidelberg	R. S. Dugan	·	41 km (25 mi)	MPC · JPL
498 Tokio	1902 KU	Tokio	December 2, 1902	Nice	A. Charlois	·	82 km (51 mi)	MPC · JPL
499 Venusia	1902 KX	Venusia	December 24, 1902	Heidelberg	M. F. Wolf	3:2	77 km (48 mi)	MPC · JPL
500 Selinur	1903 LA	Selinur	January 16, 1903	Heidelberg	M. F. Wolf	·	41 km (25 mi)	MPC · JPL

== 501–600 ==
back to top

Designation			Discovery			Properties		Ref
Permanent	Provisional	Named after	Date	Site	Discoverer(s)	Category	Diam.	Ref
501 Urhixidur	1903 LB	Urhixidur	January 18, 1903	Heidelberg	M. F. Wolf	·	74 km (46 mi)	MPC · JPL
502 Sigune	1903 LC	Sigune	January 19, 1903	Heidelberg	M. F. Wolf	PHO	16 km (9.9 mi)	MPC · JPL
503 Evelyn	1903 LF	Evelyn	January 19, 1903	Heidelberg	R. S. Dugan	·	82 km (51 mi)	MPC · JPL
504 Cora	1902 LK	Cora	June 30, 1902	Arequipa	S. I. Bailey	·	30 km (19 mi)	MPC · JPL
505 Cava	1902 LL	Cava	August 21, 1902	Arequipa	R. H. Frost	·	115 km (71 mi)	MPC · JPL
506 Marion	1903 LN	Marion	February 17, 1903	Heidelberg	R. S. Dugan	·	106 km (66 mi)	MPC · JPL
507 Laodica	1903 LO	Laodica	February 19, 1903	Heidelberg	R. S. Dugan	EOS	45 km (28 mi)	MPC · JPL
508 Princetonia	1903 LQ	Princetonia	April 20, 1903	Heidelberg	R. S. Dugan	·	117 km (73 mi)	MPC · JPL
509 Iolanda	1903 LR	Iolanda	April 28, 1903	Heidelberg	M. F. Wolf	·	52 km (32 mi)	MPC · JPL
510 Mabella	1903 LT	Mabella	May 20, 1903	Heidelberg	R. S. Dugan	·	60 km (37 mi)	MPC · JPL
511 Davida	1903 LU	Davida	May 30, 1903	Heidelberg	R. S. Dugan	·	270 km (170 mi)	MPC · JPL
512 Taurinensis	1903 LV	Taurinensis	June 23, 1903	Heidelberg	M. F. Wolf	·	23 km (14 mi)	MPC · JPL
513 Centesima	1903 LY	Centesima	August 24, 1903	Heidelberg	M. F. Wolf	EOS	49 km (30 mi)	MPC · JPL
514 Armida	1903 MB	Armida	August 24, 1903	Heidelberg	M. F. Wolf	·	120 km (75 mi)	MPC · JPL
515 Athalia	1903 ME	Athalia	September 20, 1903	Heidelberg	M. F. Wolf	THM	41 km (25 mi)	MPC · JPL
516 Amherstia	1903 MG	Amherstia	September 20, 1903	Heidelberg	R. S. Dugan	·	65 km (40 mi)	MPC · JPL
517 Edith	1903 MH	Edith	September 22, 1903	Heidelberg	R. S. Dugan	·	112 km (70 mi)	MPC · JPL
518 Halawe	1903 MO	Halawe	October 20, 1903	Heidelberg	R. S. Dugan	·	16 km (9.9 mi)	MPC · JPL
519 Sylvania	1903 MP	Sylvania	October 20, 1903	Heidelberg	R. S. Dugan	·	40 km (25 mi)	MPC · JPL
520 Franziska	1903 MV	Franziska	October 27, 1903	Heidelberg	M. F. Wolf, P. Götz	EOS	25 km (16 mi)	MPC · JPL
521 Brixia	1904 NB	Brixia	January 10, 1904	Heidelberg	R. S. Dugan	·	107 km (66 mi)	MPC · JPL
522 Helga	1904 NC	Helga	January 10, 1904	Heidelberg	M. F. Wolf	CYB	101 km (63 mi)	MPC · JPL
523 Ada	1904 ND	Ada	January 27, 1904	Heidelberg	R. S. Dugan	·	32 km (20 mi)	MPC · JPL
524 Fidelio	1904 NN	Fidelio	March 14, 1904	Heidelberg	M. F. Wolf	·	66 km (41 mi)	MPC · JPL
525 Adelaide	1908 EK^{a}	Adelaide	October 21, 1908	Taunton	J. H. Metcalf	·	9.3 km (5.8 mi)	MPC · JPL
526 Jena	1904 NQ	Jena	March 14, 1904	Heidelberg	M. F. Wolf	THM	45 km (28 mi)	MPC · JPL
527 Euryanthe	1904 NR	Euryanthe	March 20, 1904	Heidelberg	M. F. Wolf	·	53 km (33 mi)	MPC · JPL
528 Rezia	1904 NS	Rezia	March 20, 1904	Heidelberg	M. F. Wolf	CYB	92 km (57 mi)	MPC · JPL
529 Preziosa	1904 NT	Preziosa	March 20, 1904	Heidelberg	M. F. Wolf	EOS	32 km (20 mi)	MPC · JPL
530 Turandot	1904 NV	Turandot	April 11, 1904	Heidelberg	M. F. Wolf	·	85 km (53 mi)	MPC · JPL
531 Zerlina	1904 NW	Zerlina	April 12, 1904	Heidelberg	M. F. Wolf	PAL	18 km (11 mi)	MPC · JPL
532 Herculina	1904 NY	Herculina	April 20, 1904	Heidelberg	M. F. Wolf	·	168 km (104 mi)	MPC · JPL
533 Sara	1904 NZ	Sara	April 19, 1904	Heidelberg	R. S. Dugan	·	31 km (19 mi)	MPC · JPL
534 Nassovia	1904 OA	Nassovia	April 19, 1904	Heidelberg	R. S. Dugan	KOR	32 km (20 mi)	MPC · JPL
535 Montague	1904 OC	Montague	May 7, 1904	Heidelberg	R. S. Dugan	·	79 km (49 mi)	MPC · JPL
536 Merapi	1904 OF	Merapi	May 11, 1904	Washington	G. H. Peters	CYB	147 km (91 mi)	MPC · JPL
537 Pauly	1904 OG	Pauly	July 7, 1904	Nice	A. Charlois	·	41 km (25 mi)	MPC · JPL
538 Friederike	1904 OK	Friederike	July 18, 1904	Heidelberg	P. Götz	HYG	71 km (44 mi)	MPC · JPL
539 Pamina	1904 OL	Pamina	August 2, 1904	Heidelberg	M. F. Wolf	·	68 km (42 mi)	MPC · JPL
540 Rosamunde	1904 ON	Rosamunde	August 3, 1904	Heidelberg	M. F. Wolf	·	19 km (12 mi)	MPC · JPL
541 Deborah	1904 OO	Deborah	August 4, 1904	Heidelberg	M. F. Wolf	·	60 km (37 mi)	MPC · JPL
542 Susanna	1904 OQ	Susanna	August 15, 1904	Heidelberg	P. Götz, A. Kopff	·	42 km (26 mi)	MPC · JPL
543 Charlotte	1904 OT	Charlotte	September 11, 1904	Heidelberg	P. Götz	·	46 km (29 mi)	MPC · JPL
544 Jetta	1904 OU	Jetta	September 11, 1904	Heidelberg	P. Götz	·	27 km (17 mi)	MPC · JPL
545 Messalina	1904 OY	Messalina	October 3, 1904	Heidelberg	P. Götz	·	113 km (70 mi)	MPC · JPL
546 Herodias	1904 PA	Herodias	October 10, 1904	Heidelberg	P. Götz	·	66 km (41 mi)	MPC · JPL
547 Praxedis	1904 PB	Praxedis	October 14, 1904	Heidelberg	P. Götz	·	52 km (32 mi)	MPC · JPL
548 Kressida	1904 PC	Kressida	October 14, 1904	Heidelberg	P. Götz	·	14 km (8.7 mi)	MPC · JPL
549 Jessonda	1904 PK	Jessonda	November 15, 1904	Heidelberg	M. F. Wolf	·	16 km (9.9 mi)	MPC · JPL
550 Senta	1904 PL	Senta	November 16, 1904	Heidelberg	M. F. Wolf	·	37 km (23 mi)	MPC · JPL
551 Ortrud	1904 PM	Ortrud	November 16, 1904	Heidelberg	M. F. Wolf	·	81 km (50 mi)	MPC · JPL
552 Sigelinde	1904 PO	Sigelinde	December 14, 1904	Heidelberg	M. F. Wolf	·	89 km (55 mi)	MPC · JPL
553 Kundry	1904 PP	Kundry	December 27, 1904	Heidelberg	M. F. Wolf	·	9.0 km (5.6 mi)	MPC · JPL
554 Peraga	1905 PS	Peraga	January 8, 1905	Heidelberg	P. Götz	·	96 km (60 mi)	MPC · JPL
555 Norma	1905 PT	Norma	January 14, 1905	Heidelberg	M. F. Wolf	·	31 km (19 mi)	MPC · JPL
556 Phyllis	1905 PW	Phyllis	January 8, 1905	Heidelberg	P. Götz	V	36 km (22 mi)	MPC · JPL
557 Violetta	1905 PY	Violetta	January 26, 1905	Heidelberg	M. F. Wolf	·	23 km (14 mi)	MPC · JPL
558 Carmen	1905 QB	Carmen	February 9, 1905	Heidelberg	M. F. Wolf	·	55 km (34 mi)	MPC · JPL
559 Nanon	1905 QD	Nanon	March 8, 1905	Heidelberg	M. F. Wolf	·	80 km (50 mi)	MPC · JPL
560 Delila	1905 QF	Delila	March 13, 1905	Heidelberg	M. F. Wolf	·	35 km (22 mi)	MPC · JPL
561 Ingwelde	1905 QG	Ingwelde	March 26, 1905	Heidelberg	M. F. Wolf	THM	32 km (20 mi)	MPC · JPL
562 Salome	1905 QH	Salome	April 3, 1905	Heidelberg	M. F. Wolf	EOS	33 km (21 mi)	MPC · JPL
563 Suleika	1905 QK	Suleika	April 6, 1905	Heidelberg	P. Götz	·	53 km (33 mi)	MPC · JPL
564 Dudu	1905 QM	Dudu	May 9, 1905	Heidelberg	P. Götz	·	52 km (32 mi)	MPC · JPL
565 Marbachia	1905 QN	Marbachia	May 9, 1905	Heidelberg	M. F. Wolf	·	27 km (17 mi)	MPC · JPL
566 Stereoskopia	1905 QO	Stereoskopia	May 28, 1905	Heidelberg	P. Götz	CYB	167 km (104 mi)	MPC · JPL
567 Eleutheria	1905 QP	Eleutheria	May 28, 1905	Heidelberg	P. Götz	·	93 km (58 mi)	MPC · JPL
568 Cheruskia	1905 QS	Cheruskia	July 26, 1905	Heidelberg	P. Götz	·	71 km (44 mi)	MPC · JPL
569 Misa	1905 QT	Misa	July 27, 1905	Vienna	J. Palisa	MIS	73 km (45 mi)	MPC · JPL
570 Kythera	1905 QX	Kythera	July 30, 1905	Heidelberg	M. F. Wolf	CYB	87 km (54 mi)	MPC · JPL
571 Dulcinea	1905 QZ	Dulcinea	September 4, 1905	Heidelberg	P. Götz	slow	12 km (7.5 mi)	MPC · JPL
572 Rebekka	1905 RB	Rebekka	September 19, 1905	Heidelberg	P. Götz	·	29 km (18 mi)	MPC · JPL
573 Recha	1905 RC	Recha	September 19, 1905	Heidelberg	M. F. Wolf	EOS	48 km (30 mi)	MPC · JPL
574 Reginhild	1905 RD	Reginhild	September 19, 1905	Heidelberg	M. F. Wolf	·	8.5 km (5.3 mi)	MPC · JPL
575 Renate	1905 RE	Renate	September 19, 1905	Heidelberg	M. F. Wolf	MAR	19 km (12 mi)	MPC · JPL
576 Emanuela	1905 RF	Emanuela	September 22, 1905	Heidelberg	P. Götz	·	74 km (46 mi)	MPC · JPL
577 Rhea	1905 RH	Rhea	October 20, 1905	Heidelberg	M. F. Wolf	·	38 km (24 mi)	MPC · JPL
578 Happelia	1905 RZ	Happelia	November 1, 1905	Heidelberg	M. F. Wolf	·	69 km (43 mi)	MPC · JPL
579 Sidonia	1905 SD	Sidonia	November 3, 1905	Heidelberg	A. Kopff	EOS	86 km (53 mi)	MPC · JPL
580 Selene	1905 SE	Selene	December 17, 1905	Heidelberg	M. F. Wolf	·	48 km (30 mi)	MPC · JPL
581 Tauntonia	1905 SH	Tauntonia	December 24, 1905	Taunton	J. H. Metcalf	·	61 km (38 mi)	MPC · JPL
582 Olympia	1906 SO	Olympia	January 23, 1906	Heidelberg	A. Kopff	·	44 km (27 mi)	MPC · JPL
583 Klotilde	1905 SP	Klotilde	December 31, 1905	Vienna	J. Palisa	·	78 km (48 mi)	MPC · JPL
584 Semiramis	1906 SY	Semiramis	January 15, 1906	Heidelberg	A. Kopff	·	54 km (34 mi)	MPC · JPL
585 Bilkis	1906 TA	Bilkis	February 16, 1906	Heidelberg	A. Kopff	·	50 km (31 mi)	MPC · JPL
586 Thekla	1906 TC	Thekla	February 21, 1906	Heidelberg	M. F. Wolf	·	95 km (59 mi)	MPC · JPL
587 Hypsipyle	1906 TF	Hypsipyle	February 22, 1906	Heidelberg	M. F. Wolf	PHO	11 km (6.8 mi)	MPC · JPL
588 Achilles	1906 TG	Achilles	February 22, 1906	Heidelberg	M. F. Wolf	L4	130 km (81 mi)	MPC · JPL
589 Croatia	1906 TM	Croatia	March 3, 1906	Heidelberg	A. Kopff	·	94 km (58 mi)	MPC · JPL
590 Tomyris	1906 TO	Tomyris	March 4, 1906	Heidelberg	M. F. Wolf	EOS	31 km (19 mi)	MPC · JPL
591 Irmgard	1906 TP	Irmgard	March 14, 1906	Heidelberg	A. Kopff	·	52 km (32 mi)	MPC · JPL
592 Bathseba	1906 TS	Bathseba	March 18, 1906	Heidelberg	M. F. Wolf	·	44 km (27 mi)	MPC · JPL
593 Titania	1906 TT	Titania	March 20, 1906	Heidelberg	A. Kopff	·	70 km (43 mi)	MPC · JPL
594 Mireille	1906 TW	Mireille	March 27, 1906	Heidelberg	M. F. Wolf	·	9.2 km (5.7 mi)	MPC · JPL
595 Polyxena	1906 TZ	Polyxena	March 27, 1906	Heidelberg	A. Kopff	·	91 km (57 mi)	MPC · JPL
596 Scheila	1906 UA	Scheila	February 21, 1906	Heidelberg	A. Kopff	·	160 km (99 mi)	MPC · JPL
597 Bandusia	1906 UB	Bandusia	April 16, 1906	Heidelberg	M. F. Wolf	·	36 km (22 mi)	MPC · JPL
598 Octavia	1906 UC	Octavia	April 13, 1906	Heidelberg	M. F. Wolf	·	78 km (48 mi)	MPC · JPL
599 Luisa	1906 UJ	Luisa	April 25, 1906	Taunton	J. H. Metcalf	·	70 km (43 mi)	MPC · JPL
600 Musa	1906 UM	Musa	June 14, 1906	Taunton	J. H. Metcalf	·	25 km (16 mi)	MPC · JPL

== 601–700 ==
back to top

Designation			Discovery			Properties		Ref
Permanent	Provisional	Named after	Date	Site	Discoverer(s)	Category	Diam.	Ref
601 Nerthus	1906 UN	Nerthus	June 21, 1906	Heidelberg	M. F. Wolf	·	76 km (47 mi)	MPC · JPL
602 Marianna	1906 TE	Marianna	February 16, 1906	Taunton	J. H. Metcalf	·	110 km (68 mi)	MPC · JPL
603 Timandra	1906 TJ	Timandra	February 16, 1906	Taunton	J. H. Metcalf	slow	14 km (8.7 mi)	MPC · JPL
604 Tekmessa	1906 TK	Tekmessa	February 16, 1906	Taunton	J. H. Metcalf	·	65 km (40 mi)	MPC · JPL
605 Juvisia	1906 UU	Juvisia	August 27, 1906	Heidelberg	M. F. Wolf	·	70 km (43 mi)	MPC · JPL
606 Brangäne	1906 VB	Brangäne	September 18, 1906	Heidelberg	A. Kopff	BRG	36 km (22 mi)	MPC · JPL
607 Jenny	1906 VC	Jenny	September 18, 1906	Heidelberg	A. Kopff	·	68 km (42 mi)	MPC · JPL
608 Adolfine	1906 VD	Adolfine	September 18, 1906	Heidelberg	A. Kopff	EOS	20 km (12 mi)	MPC · JPL
609 Fulvia	1906 VF	Fulvia	September 24, 1906	Heidelberg	M. F. Wolf	·	54 km (34 mi)	MPC · JPL
610 Valeska	1906 VK	Valeska	September 26, 1906	Heidelberg	M. F. Wolf	·	19 km (12 mi)	MPC · JPL
611 Valeria	1906 VL	Valeria	September 24, 1906	Taunton	J. H. Metcalf	·	57 km (35 mi)	MPC · JPL
612 Veronika	1906 VN	Veronika	October 8, 1906	Heidelberg	A. Kopff	·	39 km (24 mi)	MPC · JPL
613 Ginevra	1906 VP	Ginevra	October 11, 1906	Heidelberg	A. Kopff	·	81 km (50 mi)	MPC · JPL
614 Pia	1906 VQ	Pia	October 11, 1906	Heidelberg	A. Kopff	·	29 km (18 mi)	MPC · JPL
615 Roswitha	1906 VR	Roswitha	October 11, 1906	Heidelberg	A. Kopff	·	49 km (30 mi)	MPC · JPL
616 Elly	1906 VT	Elly	October 17, 1906	Heidelberg	A. Kopff	MAR	21 km (13 mi)	MPC · JPL
617 Patroclus	1906 VY	Patroclus	October 17, 1906	Heidelberg	A. Kopff	L5 · moon · slow	140 km (87 mi)	MPC · JPL
618 Elfriede	1906 VZ	Elfriede	October 17, 1906	Heidelberg	Lohnert, K.	ELF	131 km (81 mi)	MPC · JPL
619 Triberga	1906 WC	Triberga	October 22, 1906	Heidelberg	A. Kopff	·	29 km (18 mi)	MPC · JPL
620 Drakonia	1906 WE	Drakonia	October 26, 1906	Taunton	J. H. Metcalf	·	11 km (6.8 mi)	MPC · JPL
621 Werdandi	1906 WJ	Werdandi	November 11, 1906	Heidelberg	A. Kopff	THM ·	30 km (19 mi)	MPC · JPL
622 Esther	1906 WP	Esther	November 13, 1906	Taunton	J. H. Metcalf	·	22 km (14 mi)	MPC · JPL
623 Chimaera	1907 XJ	Chimaera	January 22, 1907	Heidelberg	Lohnert, K.	PHO	44 km (27 mi)	MPC · JPL
624 Hektor	1907 XM	Hektor	February 10, 1907	Heidelberg	A. Kopff	L4 · HEK · moon	225 km (140 mi)	MPC · JPL
625 Xenia	1907 XN	Xenia	February 11, 1907	Heidelberg	A. Kopff	·	28 km (17 mi)	MPC · JPL
626 Notburga	1907 XO	Notburga	February 11, 1907	Heidelberg	A. Kopff	·	73 km (45 mi)	MPC · JPL
627 Charis	1907 XS	Charis	March 4, 1907	Heidelberg	A. Kopff	·	38 km (24 mi)	MPC · JPL
628 Christine	1907 XT	Christine	March 7, 1907	Heidelberg	A. Kopff	·	48 km (30 mi)	MPC · JPL
629 Bernardina	1907 XU	Bernardina	March 7, 1907	Heidelberg	A. Kopff	·	35 km (22 mi)	MPC · JPL
630 Euphemia	1907 XW	Euphemia	March 7, 1907	Heidelberg	A. Kopff	EUN · slow	16 km (9.9 mi)	MPC · JPL
631 Philippina	1907 YJ	Philippina	March 21, 1907	Heidelberg	A. Kopff	·	50 km (31 mi)	MPC · JPL
632 Pyrrha	1907 YX	Pyrrha	April 5, 1907	Heidelberg	A. Kopff	·	14 km (8.7 mi)	MPC · JPL
633 Zelima	1907 ZM	Zelima	May 12, 1907	Heidelberg	A. Kopff	EOS	33 km (21 mi)	MPC · JPL
634 Ute	1907 ZN	Ute	May 12, 1907	Heidelberg	A. Kopff	·	74 km (46 mi)	MPC · JPL
635 Vundtia	1907 ZS	Vundtia	June 9, 1907	Heidelberg	Lohnert, K.	EOS	94 km (58 mi)	MPC · JPL
636 Erika	1907 XP	Erika	February 8, 1907	Taunton	J. H. Metcalf	·	73 km (45 mi)	MPC · JPL
637 Chrysothemis	1907 YE	Chrysothemis	March 11, 1907	Taunton	J. H. Metcalf	THM	24 km (15 mi)	MPC · JPL
638 Moira	1907 ZQ	Moira	May 5, 1907	Taunton	J. H. Metcalf	·	60 km (37 mi)	MPC · JPL
639 Latona	1907 ZT	Latona	July 19, 1907	Heidelberg	Lohnert, K.	EOS	79 km (49 mi)	MPC · JPL
640 Brambilla	1907 ZW	Brambilla	August 29, 1907	Heidelberg	A. Kopff	·	63 km (39 mi)	MPC · JPL
641 Agnes	1907 ZX	Agnes	September 8, 1907	Heidelberg	M. F. Wolf	slow	9.4 km (5.8 mi)	MPC · JPL
642 Clara	1907 ZY	Clara	September 8, 1907	Heidelberg	M. F. Wolf	·	33 km (21 mi)	MPC · JPL
643 Scheherezade	1907 ZZ	Scheherezade	September 8, 1907	Heidelberg	A. Kopff	CYB	65 km (40 mi)	MPC · JPL
644 Cosima	1907 AA	Cosima	September 7, 1907	Heidelberg	A. Kopff	·	17 km (11 mi)	MPC · JPL
645 Agrippina	1907 AG	Agrippina	September 13, 1907	Taunton	J. H. Metcalf	·	29 km (18 mi)	MPC · JPL
646 Kastalia	1907 AC	Kastalia	September 11, 1907	Heidelberg	A. Kopff	·	8.2 km (5.1 mi)	MPC · JPL
647 Adelgunde	1907 AD	Adelgunde	September 11, 1907	Heidelberg	A. Kopff	·	9.7 km (6.0 mi)	MPC · JPL
648 Pippa	1907 AE	Pippa	September 11, 1907	Heidelberg	A. Kopff	·	68 km (42 mi)	MPC · JPL
649 Josefa	1907 AF	Josefa	September 11, 1907	Heidelberg	A. Kopff	·	7.7 km (4.8 mi)	MPC · JPL
650 Amalasuntha	1907 AM	Amalasuntha	October 4, 1907	Heidelberg	A. Kopff	NYS	19 km (12 mi)	MPC · JPL
651 Antikleia	1907 AN	Antikleia	October 4, 1907	Heidelberg	A. Kopff	EOS	32 km (20 mi)	MPC · JPL
652 Jubilatrix	1907 AU	Jubilatrix	November 4, 1907	Vienna	J. Palisa	·	16 km (9.9 mi)	MPC · JPL
653 Berenike	1907 BK	Berenike	November 27, 1907	Taunton	J. H. Metcalf	EOS	50 km (31 mi)	MPC · JPL
654 Zelinda	1908 BM	Zelinda	January 4, 1908	Heidelberg	A. Kopff	PHO	161 km (100 mi)	MPC · JPL
655 Briseïs	1907 BF	Briseïs	November 4, 1907	Taunton	J. H. Metcalf	slow	29 km (18 mi)	MPC · JPL
656 Beagle	1908 BU	Beagle	January 22, 1908	Heidelberg	A. Kopff	THM	63 km (39 mi)	MPC · JPL
657 Gunlöd	1908 BV	Gunlöd	January 23, 1908	Heidelberg	A. Kopff	·	39 km (24 mi)	MPC · JPL
658 Asteria	1908 BW	Asteria	January 23, 1908	Heidelberg	A. Kopff	KOR	22 km (14 mi)	MPC · JPL
659 Nestor	1908 CS	Nestor	March 23, 1908	Heidelberg	M. F. Wolf	L4	112 km (70 mi)	MPC · JPL
660 Crescentia	1908 CC	Crescentia	January 8, 1908	Taunton	J. H. Metcalf	MAR	42 km (26 mi)	MPC · JPL
661 Cloelia	1908 CL	Cloelia	February 22, 1908	Taunton	J. H. Metcalf	EOS	40 km (25 mi)	MPC · JPL
662 Newtonia	1908 CW	Newtonia	March 30, 1908	Taunton	J. H. Metcalf	·	22 km (14 mi)	MPC · JPL
663 Gerlinde	1908 DG	Gerlinde	June 24, 1908	Heidelberg	A. Kopff	·	108 km (67 mi)	MPC · JPL
664 Judith	1908 DH	Judith	June 24, 1908	Heidelberg	A. Kopff	·	85 km (53 mi)	MPC · JPL
665 Sabine	1908 DK	Sabine	July 22, 1908	Heidelberg	W. Lorenz	·	51 km (32 mi)	MPC · JPL
666 Desdemona	1908 DM	Desdemona	July 23, 1908	Heidelberg	A. Kopff	·	33 km (21 mi)	MPC · JPL
667 Denise	1908 DN	Denise	July 23, 1908	Heidelberg	A. Kopff	·	89 km (55 mi)	MPC · JPL
668 Dora	1908 DO	Dora	July 27, 1908	Heidelberg	A. Kopff	DOR	22 km (14 mi)	MPC · JPL
669 Kypria	1908 DQ	Kypria	August 20, 1908	Heidelberg	A. Kopff	EOS	29 km (18 mi)	MPC · JPL
670 Ottegebe	1908 DR	Ottegebe	August 20, 1908	Heidelberg	A. Kopff	·	36 km (22 mi)	MPC · JPL
671 Carnegia	1908 DV	Carnegia	September 21, 1908	Vienna	J. Palisa	·	61 km (38 mi)	MPC · JPL
672 Astarte	1908 DY	Astarte	September 21, 1908	Heidelberg	A. Kopff	·	36 km (22 mi)	MPC · JPL
673 Edda	1908 EA	Edda	September 20, 1908	Taunton	J. H. Metcalf	·	38 km (24 mi)	MPC · JPL
674 Rachele	1908 EP	Rachele	October 28, 1908	Heidelberg	W. Lorenz	·	96 km (60 mi)	MPC · JPL
675 Ludmilla	1908 DU	Ludmilla	August 30, 1908	Taunton	J. H. Metcalf	·	76 km (47 mi)	MPC · JPL
676 Melitta	1909 FN	Melitta	January 16, 1909	Greenwich	P. Melotte	EOS	78 km (48 mi)	MPC · JPL
677 Aaltje	1909 FR	Aaltje	January 18, 1909	Heidelberg	A. Kopff	·	32 km (20 mi)	MPC · JPL
678 Fredegundis	1909 FS	Fredegundis	January 22, 1909	Heidelberg	W. Lorenz	·	40 km (25 mi)	MPC · JPL
679 Pax	1909 FY	Pax	January 28, 1909	Heidelberg	A. Kopff	·	64 km (40 mi)	MPC · JPL
680 Genoveva	1909 GW	Genoveva	April 22, 1909	Heidelberg	A. Kopff	·	84 km (52 mi)	MPC · JPL
681 Gorgo	1909 GZ	Gorgo	May 13, 1909	Heidelberg	A. Kopff	·	20 km (12 mi)	MPC · JPL
682 Hagar	1909 HA	Hagar	June 17, 1909	Heidelberg	A. Kopff	EUN	10 km (6.2 mi)	MPC · JPL
683 Lanzia	1909 HC	Lanzia	July 23, 1909	Heidelberg	M. F. Wolf	·	83 km (52 mi)	MPC · JPL
684 Hildburg	1909 HD	Hildburg	August 8, 1909	Heidelberg	A. Kopff	·	19 km (12 mi)	MPC · JPL
685 Hermia	1909 HE	Hermia	August 12, 1909	Heidelberg	W. Lorenz	·	11 km (6.8 mi)	MPC · JPL
686 Gersuind	1909 HF	Gersuind	August 15, 1909	Heidelberg	A. Kopff	(194)	55 km (34 mi)	MPC · JPL
687 Tinette	1909 HG	Tinette	August 16, 1909	Vienna	J. Palisa	·	22 km (14 mi)	MPC · JPL
688 Melanie	1909 HH	Melanie	August 25, 1909	Vienna	J. Palisa	·	42 km (26 mi)	MPC · JPL
689 Zita	1909 HJ	Zita	September 12, 1909	Vienna	J. Palisa	·	16 km (9.9 mi)	MPC · JPL
690 Wratislavia	1909 HZ	Wratislavia	October 16, 1909	Taunton	J. H. Metcalf	·	135 km (84 mi)	MPC · JPL
691 Lehigh	1909 JG	Lehigh	December 11, 1909	Taunton	J. H. Metcalf	·	79 km (49 mi)	MPC · JPL
692 Hippodamia	1901 HD	Hippodamia	November 5, 1901	Heidelberg	M. F. Wolf, A. Kopff	T_{j} (2.96) · CYB	43 km (27 mi)	MPC · JPL
693 Zerbinetta	1909 HN	Zerbinetta	September 21, 1909	Heidelberg	A. Kopff	·	82 km (51 mi)	MPC · JPL
694 Ekard	1909 JA	Ekard	November 7, 1909	Taunton	J. H. Metcalf	·	122 km (76 mi)	MPC · JPL
695 Bella	1909 JB	Bella	November 7, 1909	Taunton	J. H. Metcalf	MAR	41 km (25 mi)	MPC · JPL
696 Leonora	1910 JJ	Leonora	January 10, 1910	Taunton	J. H. Metcalf	·	82 km (51 mi)	MPC · JPL
697 Galilea	1910 JO	Galilea	February 14, 1910	Heidelberg	J. Helffrich	·	80 km (50 mi)	MPC · JPL
698 Ernestina	1910 JX	Ernestina	March 5, 1910	Heidelberg	J. Helffrich	·	27 km (17 mi)	MPC · JPL
699 Hela	1910 KD	Hela	June 5, 1910	Heidelberg	J. Helffrich	·	20 km (12 mi)	MPC · JPL
700 Auravictrix	1910 KE	Auravictrix	June 5, 1910	Heidelberg	J. Helffrich	·	16 km (9.9 mi)	MPC · JPL

== 701–800 ==
back to top

Designation			Discovery			Properties		Ref
Permanent	Provisional	Named after	Date	Site	Discoverer(s)	Category	Diam.	Ref
701 Oriola	1910 KN	Oriola	July 12, 1910	Heidelberg	J. Helffrich	·	43 km (27 mi)	MPC · JPL
702 Alauda	1910 KQ	Alauda	July 16, 1910	Heidelberg	J. Helffrich	moon	191 km (119 mi)	MPC · JPL
703 Noëmi	1910 KT	Noëmi	October 3, 1910	Vienna	J. Palisa	slow	7.2 km (4.5 mi)	MPC · JPL
704 Interamnia	1910 KU	Interamnia	October 2, 1910	Teramo	V. Cerulli	·	306 km (190 mi)	MPC · JPL
705 Erminia	1910 KV	Erminia	October 6, 1910	Heidelberg	E. Ernst	·	132 km (82 mi)	MPC · JPL
706 Hirundo	1910 KX	Hirundo	October 9, 1910	Heidelberg	J. Helffrich	·	31 km (19 mi)	MPC · JPL
707 Steina	1910 LD	Steina	December 22, 1910	Heidelberg	M. F. Wolf	slow	9.0 km (5.6 mi)	MPC · JPL
708 Raphaela	1911 LJ	Raphaela	February 3, 1911	Heidelberg	J. Helffrich	·	21 km (13 mi)	MPC · JPL
709 Fringilla	1911 LK	Fringilla	February 3, 1911	Heidelberg	J. Helffrich	·	95 km (59 mi)	MPC · JPL
710 Gertrud	1911 LM	Gertrud	February 28, 1911	Vienna	J. Palisa	THM	29 km (18 mi)	MPC · JPL
711 Marmulla	1911 LN	Marmulla	March 1, 1911	Vienna	J. Palisa	·	9.0 km (5.6 mi)	MPC · JPL
712 Boliviana	1911 LO	Boliviana	March 19, 1911	Heidelberg	M. F. Wolf	·	124 km (77 mi)	MPC · JPL
713 Luscinia	1911 LS	Luscinia	April 18, 1911	Heidelberg	J. Helffrich	CYB	98 km (61 mi)	MPC · JPL
714 Ulula	1911 LW	Ulula	May 18, 1911	Heidelberg	J. Helffrich	MAR	41 km (25 mi)	MPC · JPL
715 Transvaalia	1911 LX	Transvaalia	April 22, 1911	Johannesburg	H. E. Wood	·	25 km (16 mi)	MPC · JPL
716 Berkeley	1911 MD	Berkeley	July 30, 1911	Vienna	J. Palisa	·	20 km (12 mi)	MPC · JPL
717 Wisibada	1911 MJ	Wisibada	August 26, 1911	Heidelberg	F. Kaiser	·	28 km (17 mi)	MPC · JPL
718 Erida	1911 MS	Erida	September 29, 1911	Vienna	J. Palisa	·	71 km (44 mi)	MPC · JPL
719 Albert	1911 MT	Albert	October 3, 1911	Vienna	J. Palisa	AMO +1 km (0.62 mi)	2.7 km (1.7 mi)	MPC · JPL
720 Bohlinia	1911 MW	Bohlinia	October 18, 1911	Heidelberg	F. Kaiser	KOR	34 km (21 mi)	MPC · JPL
721 Tabora	1911 MZ	Tabora	October 18, 1911	Heidelberg	F. Kaiser	CYB	86 km (53 mi)	MPC · JPL
722 Frieda	1911 NA	Frieda	October 18, 1911	Vienna	J. Palisa	slow	8.3 km (5.2 mi)	MPC · JPL
723 Hammonia	1911 NB	Hammonia	October 21, 1911	Vienna	J. Palisa	·	23 km (14 mi)	MPC · JPL
724 Hapag	1911 NC	Hapag	October 21, 1911	Vienna	J. Palisa	·	9.5 km (5.9 mi)	MPC · JPL
725 Amanda	1911 ND	Amanda	October 21, 1911	Vienna	J. Palisa	·	24 km (15 mi)	MPC · JPL
726 Joëlla	1911 NM	Joëlla	November 22, 1911	Winchester	J. H. Metcalf	·	44 km (27 mi)	MPC · JPL
727 Nipponia	1912 NT	Nipponia	February 11, 1912	Heidelberg	A. Massinger	MAR	32 km (20 mi)	MPC · JPL
728 Leonisis	1912 NU	Leonisis	February 16, 1912	Vienna	J. Palisa	·	5.9 km (3.7 mi)	MPC · JPL
729 Watsonia	1912 OD	Watsonia	February 9, 1912	Winchester	J. H. Metcalf	WAT	50 km (31 mi)	MPC · JPL
730 Athanasia	1912 OK	Athanasia	April 10, 1912	Vienna	J. Palisa	·	4.5 km (2.8 mi)	MPC · JPL
731 Sorga	1912 OQ	Sorga	April 15, 1912	Heidelberg	A. Massinger	·	35 km (22 mi)	MPC · JPL
732 Tjilaki	1912 OR	Tjilaki	April 15, 1912	Heidelberg	A. Massinger	·	30 km (19 mi)	MPC · JPL
733 Mocia	1912 PF	Mocia	September 16, 1912	Heidelberg	M. F. Wolf	CYB	98 km (61 mi)	MPC · JPL
734 Benda	1912 PH	Benda	October 11, 1912	Vienna	J. Palisa	·	67 km (42 mi)	MPC · JPL
735 Marghanna	1912 PY	Marghanna	December 9, 1912	Heidelberg	H. Vogt	·	68 km (42 mi)	MPC · JPL
736 Harvard	1912 PZ	Harvard	November 16, 1912	Winchester	J. H. Metcalf	·	17 km (11 mi)	MPC · JPL
737 Arequipa	1912 QB	Arequipa	December 7, 1912	Winchester	J. H. Metcalf	·	48 km (30 mi)	MPC · JPL
738 Alagasta	1913 QO	Alagasta	January 7, 1913	Heidelberg	F. Kaiser	·	63 km (39 mi)	MPC · JPL
739 Mandeville	1913 QR	Mandeville	February 7, 1913	Winchester	J. H. Metcalf	·	105 km (65 mi)	MPC · JPL
740 Cantabia	1913 QS	Cantabia	February 10, 1913	Winchester	J. H. Metcalf	·	91 km (57 mi)	MPC · JPL
741 Botolphia	1913 QT	Botolphia	February 10, 1913	Winchester	J. H. Metcalf	·	30 km (19 mi)	MPC · JPL
742 Edisona	1913 QU	Edisona	February 23, 1913	Heidelberg	F. Kaiser	EOS	47 km (29 mi)	MPC · JPL
743 Eugenisis	1913 QV	Eugenisis	February 25, 1913	Heidelberg	F. Kaiser	·	51 km (32 mi)	MPC · JPL
744 Aguntina	1913 QW	Aguntina	February 26, 1913	Vienna	J. Rheden	·	59 km (37 mi)	MPC · JPL
745 Mauritia	1913 QX	Mauritia	March 1, 1913	Heidelberg	F. Kaiser	·	25 km (16 mi)	MPC · JPL
746 Marlu	1913 QY	Marlu	March 1, 1913	Heidelberg	F. Kaiser	·	74 km (46 mi)	MPC · JPL
747 Winchester	1913 QZ	Winchester	March 7, 1913	Winchester	J. H. Metcalf	·	172 km (107 mi)	MPC · JPL
748 Simeïsa	1913 RD	Simeïsa	March 14, 1913	Crimea-Simeis	G. N. Neujmin	3:2	104 km (65 mi)	MPC · JPL
749 Malzovia	1913 RF	Malzovia	April 5, 1913	Crimea-Simeis	S. Belyavsky	·	11 km (6.8 mi)	MPC · JPL
750 Oskar	1913 RG	Oskar	April 28, 1913	Vienna	J. Palisa	NYS	23 km (14 mi)	MPC · JPL
751 Faïna	1913 RK	Faïna	April 28, 1913	Crimea-Simeis	G. N. Neujmin	·	114 km (71 mi)	MPC · JPL
752 Sulamitis	1913 RL	Sulamitis	April 30, 1913	Crimea-Simeis	G. N. Neujmin	SUL	60 km (37 mi)	MPC · JPL
753 Tiflis	1913 RM	Tiflis	April 30, 1913	Crimea-Simeis	G. N. Neujmin	·	21 km (13 mi)	MPC · JPL
754 Malabar	1906 UT	Malabar	August 22, 1906	Heidelberg	A. Kopff	·	95 km (59 mi)	MPC · JPL
755 Quintilla	1908 CZ	Quintilla	April 6, 1908	Taunton	J. H. Metcalf	·	41 km (25 mi)	MPC · JPL
756 Lilliana	1908 DC	Lilliana	April 26, 1908	Taunton	J. H. Metcalf	·	65 km (40 mi)	MPC · JPL
757 Portlandia	1908 EJ	Portlandia	September 30, 1908	Taunton	J. H. Metcalf	·	33 km (21 mi)	MPC · JPL
758 Mancunia	1912 PE	Mancunia	May 18, 1912	Johannesburg	H. E. Wood	HYG	89 km (55 mi)	MPC · JPL
759 Vinifera	1913 SJ	Vinifera	August 26, 1913	Heidelberg	F. Kaiser	·	53 km (33 mi)	MPC · JPL
760 Massinga	1913 SL	Massinga	August 28, 1913	Heidelberg	F. Kaiser	·	71 km (44 mi)	MPC · JPL
761 Brendelia	1913 SO	Brendelia	September 8, 1913	Heidelberg	F. Kaiser	KOR · moon	21 km (13 mi)	MPC · JPL
762 Pulcova	1913 SQ	Pulcova	September 3, 1913	Crimea-Simeis	G. N. Neujmin	moon	147 km (91 mi)	MPC · JPL
763 Cupido	1913 ST	Cupido	September 25, 1913	Heidelberg	F. Kaiser	slow	7.0 km (4.3 mi)	MPC · JPL
764 Gedania	1913 SU	Gedania	September 26, 1913	Heidelberg	F. Kaiser	·	58 km (36 mi)	MPC · JPL
765 Mattiaca	1913 SV	Mattiaca	September 26, 1913	Heidelberg	F. Kaiser	(5)	8.0 km (5.0 mi)	MPC · JPL
766 Moguntia	1913 SW	Moguntia	September 29, 1913	Heidelberg	F. Kaiser	EOS ·	41 km (25 mi)	MPC · JPL
767 Bondia	1913 SX	Bondia	September 23, 1913	Winchester	J. H. Metcalf	THM	43 km (27 mi)	MPC · JPL
768 Struveana	1913 SZ	Struveana	October 4, 1913	Crimea-Simeis	G. N. Neujmin	·	33 km (21 mi)	MPC · JPL
769 Tatjana	1913 TA	Tatjana	October 6, 1913	Crimea-Simeis	G. N. Neujmin	·	97 km (60 mi)	MPC · JPL
770 Bali	1913 TE	Bali	October 31, 1913	Heidelberg	A. Massinger	·	16 km (9.9 mi)	MPC · JPL
771 Libera	1913 TO	Libera	November 21, 1913	Vienna	J. Rheden	·	29 km (18 mi)	MPC · JPL
772 Tanete	1913 TR	Tanete	December 19, 1913	Heidelberg	A. Massinger	·	126 km (78 mi)	MPC · JPL
773 Irmintraud	1913 TV	Irmintraud	December 22, 1913	Heidelberg	F. Kaiser	·	92 km (57 mi)	MPC · JPL
774 Armor	1913 TW	Armor	December 19, 1913	Paris	C. le Morvan	·	50 km (31 mi)	MPC · JPL
775 Lumière	1914 TX	Lumière	January 6, 1914	Nice	J. Lagrula	EOS	32 km (20 mi)	MPC · JPL
776 Berbericia	1914 TY	Berbericia	January 24, 1914	Heidelberg	A. Massinger	·	152 km (94 mi)	MPC · JPL
777 Gutemberga	1914 TZ	Gutemberga	January 24, 1914	Heidelberg	F. Kaiser	·	72 km (45 mi)	MPC · JPL
778 Theobalda	1914 UA	Theobalda	January 25, 1914	Heidelberg	F. Kaiser	THB	55 km (34 mi)	MPC · JPL
779 Nina	1914 UB	Nina	January 25, 1914	Crimea-Simeis	G. N. Neujmin	·	81 km (50 mi)	MPC · JPL
780 Armenia	1914 UC	Armenia	January 25, 1914	Crimea-Simeis	G. N. Neujmin	ARM	126 km (78 mi)	MPC · JPL
781 Kartvelia	1914 UF	Kartvelia	January 25, 1914	Crimea-Simeis	G. N. Neujmin	·	73 km (45 mi)	MPC · JPL
782 Montefiore	1914 UK	Montefiore	March 18, 1914	Vienna	J. Palisa	·	14 km (8.7 mi)	MPC · JPL
783 Nora	1914 UL	Nora	March 18, 1914	Vienna	J. Palisa	·	39 km (24 mi)	MPC · JPL
784 Pickeringia	1914 UM	Pickeringia	March 20, 1914	Winchester	J. H. Metcalf	·	76 km (47 mi)	MPC · JPL
785 Zwetana	1914 UN	Zwetana	March 30, 1914	Heidelberg	A. Massinger	·	49 km (30 mi)	MPC · JPL
786 Bredichina	1914 UO	Bredichina	April 20, 1914	Heidelberg	F. Kaiser	·	108 km (67 mi)	MPC · JPL
787 Moskva	1914 UQ	Moskva	April 20, 1914	Crimea-Simeis	G. N. Neujmin	MAR	28 km (17 mi)	MPC · JPL
788 Hohensteina	1914 UR	Hohensteina	April 28, 1914	Heidelberg	F. Kaiser	·	111 km (69 mi)	MPC · JPL
789 Lena	1914 UU	Lena	June 24, 1914	Crimea-Simeis	G. N. Neujmin	·	22 km (14 mi)	MPC · JPL
790 Pretoria	1912 NW	Pretoria	January 16, 1912	Johannesburg	H. E. Wood	CYB	170 km (110 mi)	MPC · JPL
791 Ani	1914 UV	Ani	June 29, 1914	Crimea-Simeis	G. N. Neujmin	·	117 km (73 mi)	MPC · JPL
792 Metcalfia	1907 ZC	Metcalfia	March 20, 1907	Taunton	J. H. Metcalf	·	62 km (39 mi)	MPC · JPL
793 Arizona	1907 ZD	Arizona	April 9, 1907	Flagstaff	P. Lowell	·	27 km (17 mi)	MPC · JPL
794 Irenaea	1914 VB	Irenaea	August 27, 1914	Vienna	J. Palisa	·	36 km (22 mi)	MPC · JPL
795 Fini	1914 VE	Fini	September 26, 1914	Vienna	J. Palisa	·	85 km (53 mi)	MPC · JPL
796 Sarita	1914 VH	Sarita	October 15, 1914	Heidelberg	K. Reinmuth	·	44 km (27 mi)	MPC · JPL
797 Montana	1914 VR	Montana	November 17, 1914	Hamburg-Bergedorf	H. Thiele	·	21 km (13 mi)	MPC · JPL
798 Ruth	1914 VT	Ruth	November 21, 1914	Heidelberg	M. F. Wolf	EOS	43 km (27 mi)	MPC · JPL
799 Gudula	1915 WO	Gudula	March 9, 1915	Heidelberg	K. Reinmuth	·	47 km (29 mi)	MPC · JPL
800 Kressmannia	1915 WP	Kressmannia	March 20, 1915	Heidelberg	M. F. Wolf	·	15 km (9.3 mi)	MPC · JPL

== 801–900 ==
back to top

Designation			Discovery			Properties		Ref
Permanent	Provisional	Named after	Date	Site	Discoverer(s)	Category	Diam.	Ref
801 Helwerthia	1915 WQ	Helwerthia	March 20, 1915	Heidelberg	M. F. Wolf	EUN	32 km (20 mi)	MPC · JPL
802 Epyaxa	1915 WR	Epyaxa	March 20, 1915	Heidelberg	M. F. Wolf	·	7.4 km (4.6 mi)	MPC · JPL
803 Picka	1915 WS	Picka	March 21, 1915	Vienna	J. Palisa	·	46 km (29 mi)	MPC · JPL
804 Hispania	1915 WT	Hispania	March 20, 1915	Barcelona	J. Comas i Solà	·	138 km (86 mi)	MPC · JPL
805 Hormuthia	1915 WW	Hormuthia	April 17, 1915	Heidelberg	M. F. Wolf	·	73 km (45 mi)	MPC · JPL
806 Gyldénia	1915 WX	Gyldénia	April 18, 1915	Heidelberg	M. F. Wolf	·	83 km (52 mi)	MPC · JPL
807 Ceraskia	1915 WY	Ceraskia	April 18, 1915	Heidelberg	M. F. Wolf	EOS	21 km (13 mi)	MPC · JPL
808 Merxia	1901 GY	Merxia	October 11, 1901	Heidelberg	L. Carnera	MRX	31 km (19 mi)	MPC · JPL
809 Lundia	1915 XP	Lundia	August 11, 1915	Heidelberg	M. F. Wolf	moon	9.4 km (5.8 mi)	MPC · JPL
810 Atossa	1915 XQ	Atossa	September 8, 1915	Heidelberg	M. F. Wolf	·	8.1 km (5.0 mi)	MPC · JPL
811 Nauheima	1915 XR	Nauheima	September 8, 1915	Heidelberg	M. F. Wolf	KOR	16 km (9.9 mi)	MPC · JPL
812 Adele	1915 XV	Adele	September 8, 1915	Crimea-Simeis	S. Belyavsky	EUN	12 km (7.5 mi)	MPC · JPL
813 Baumeia	1915 YR	Baumeia	November 28, 1915	Heidelberg	M. F. Wolf	·	12 km (7.5 mi)	MPC · JPL
814 Tauris	1916 YT	Tauris	January 2, 1916	Crimea-Simeis	G. N. Neujmin	·	102 km (63 mi)	MPC · JPL
815 Coppelia	1916 YU	Coppelia	February 2, 1916	Heidelberg	M. F. Wolf	·	17 km (11 mi)	MPC · JPL
816 Juliana	1916 YV	Juliana	February 8, 1916	Heidelberg	M. F. Wolf	·	51 km (32 mi)	MPC · JPL
817 Annika	1916 YW	Annika	February 6, 1916	Heidelberg	M. F. Wolf	·	23 km (14 mi)	MPC · JPL
818 Kapteynia	1916 YZ	Kapteynia	February 21, 1916	Heidelberg	M. F. Wolf	·	64 km (40 mi)	MPC · JPL
819 Barnardiana	1916 ZA	Barnardiana	March 3, 1916	Heidelberg	M. F. Wolf	·	8.9 km (5.5 mi)	MPC · JPL
820 Adriana	1916 ZB	Adriana	March 30, 1916	Heidelberg	M. F. Wolf	·	59 km (37 mi)	MPC · JPL
821 Fanny	1916 ZC	Fanny	March 31, 1916	Heidelberg	M. F. Wolf	slow	29 km (18 mi)	MPC · JPL
822 Lalage	1916 ZD	Lalage	March 31, 1916	Heidelberg	M. F. Wolf	·	8.2 km (5.1 mi)	MPC · JPL
823 Sisigambis	1916 ZG	Sisigambis	March 31, 1916	Heidelberg	M. F. Wolf	slow	15 km (9.3 mi)	MPC · JPL
824 Anastasia	1916 ZH	Anastasia	March 25, 1916	Crimea-Simeis	G. N. Neujmin	slow	32 km (20 mi)	MPC · JPL
825 Tanina	1916 ZL	Tanina	March 27, 1916	Crimea-Simeis	G. N. Neujmin	·	13 km (8.1 mi)	MPC · JPL
826 Henrika	1916 ZO	Henrika	April 28, 1916	Heidelberg	M. F. Wolf	·	23 km (14 mi)	MPC · JPL
827 Wolfiana	1916 ZW	Wolfiana	August 29, 1916	Vienna	J. Palisa	·	8.5 km (5.3 mi)	MPC · JPL
828 Lindemannia	1916 ZX	Lindemannia	August 29, 1916	Vienna	J. Palisa	·	48 km (30 mi)	MPC · JPL
829 Academia	1916 ZY	Academia	August 25, 1916	Crimea-Simeis	G. N. Neujmin	·	43 km (27 mi)	MPC · JPL
830 Petropolitana	1916 ZZ	Petropolitana	August 25, 1916	Crimea-Simeis	G. N. Neujmin	·	41 km (25 mi)	MPC · JPL
831 Stateira	1916 AA	Stateira	September 20, 1916	Heidelberg	M. F. Wolf	slow	7.2 km (4.5 mi)	MPC · JPL
832 Karin	1916 AB	Karin	September 20, 1916	Heidelberg	M. F. Wolf	KOR	16 km (9.9 mi)	MPC · JPL
833 Monica	1916 AC	Monica	September 20, 1916	Heidelberg	M. F. Wolf	EOS	22 km (14 mi)	MPC · JPL
834 Burnhamia	1916 AD	Burnhamia	September 20, 1916	Heidelberg	M. F. Wolf	·	61 km (38 mi)	MPC · JPL
835 Olivia	1916 AE	Olivia	September 23, 1916	Heidelberg	M. F. Wolf	·	30 km (19 mi)	MPC · JPL
836 Jole	1916 AF	Jole	September 23, 1916	Heidelberg	M. F. Wolf	·	5.8 km (3.6 mi)	MPC · JPL
837 Schwarzschilda	1916 AG	Schwarzschilda	September 23, 1916	Heidelberg	M. F. Wolf	slow	6.0 km (3.7 mi)	MPC · JPL
838 Seraphina	1916 AH	Seraphina	September 24, 1916	Heidelberg	M. F. Wolf	·	58 km (36 mi)	MPC · JPL
839 Valborg	1916 AJ	Valborg	September 24, 1916	Heidelberg	M. F. Wolf	·	20 km (12 mi)	MPC · JPL
840 Zenobia	1916 AK	Zenobia	September 25, 1916	Heidelberg	M. F. Wolf	·	27 km (17 mi)	MPC · JPL
841 Arabella	1916 AL	Arabella	October 1, 1916	Heidelberg	M. F. Wolf	·	7.5 km (4.7 mi)	MPC · JPL
842 Kerstin	1916 AM	Kerstin	October 1, 1916	Heidelberg	M. F. Wolf	·	44 km (27 mi)	MPC · JPL
843 Nicolaia	1916 AN	Nicolaia	September 30, 1916	Hamburg-Bergedorf	H. Thiele	·	5.0 km (3.1 mi)	MPC · JPL
844 Leontina	1916 AP	Leontina	October 1, 1916	Vienna	J. Rheden	·	42 km (26 mi)	MPC · JPL
845 Naëma	1916 AS	Naëma	November 16, 1916	Heidelberg	M. F. Wolf	NAE	53 km (33 mi)	MPC · JPL
846 Lipperta	1916 AT	Lipperta	November 26, 1916	Hamburg-Bergedorf	K. Gyllenberg	THM · slow	52 km (32 mi)	MPC · JPL
847 Agnia	1915 XX	Agnia	September 2, 1915	Crimea-Simeis	G. N. Neujmin	AGN	25 km (16 mi)	MPC · JPL
848 Inna	1915 XS	Inna	September 5, 1915	Crimea-Simeis	G. N. Neujmin	THM	33 km (21 mi)	MPC · JPL
849 Ara	1912 NY	Ara	February 9, 1912	Crimea-Simeis	S. Belyavsky	·	81 km (50 mi)	MPC · JPL
850 Altona	Σ 24	Altona	March 27, 1916	Crimea-Simeis	S. Belyavsky	·	81 km (50 mi)	MPC · JPL
851 Zeissia	Σ 26	Zeissia	April 2, 1916	Crimea-Simeis	S. Belyavsky	·	13 km (8.1 mi)	MPC · JPL
852 Wladilena	Σ 27	Wladilena	April 2, 1916	Crimea-Simeis	S. Belyavsky	PHO	27 km (17 mi)	MPC · JPL
853 Nansenia	Σ 28	Nansenia	April 2, 1916	Crimea-Simeis	S. Belyavsky	·	28 km (17 mi)	MPC · JPL
854 Frostia	Σ 29	Frostia	April 3, 1916	Crimea-Simeis	S. Belyavsky	moon	7.8 km (4.8 mi)	MPC · JPL
855 Newcombia	1916 ZP	Newcombia	April 3, 1916	Crimea-Simeis	S. Belyavsky	·	12 km (7.5 mi)	MPC · JPL
856 Backlunda	Σ 30	Backlunda	April 3, 1916	Crimea-Simeis	S. Belyavsky	PHO	45 km (28 mi)	MPC · JPL
857 Glasenappia	Σ 33	Glasenappia	April 6, 1916	Crimea-Simeis	S. Belyavsky	·	14 km (8.7 mi)	MPC · JPL
858 El Djezaïr	1916 a	El Djezaïr	May 26, 1916	Algiers	F. Sy	·	23 km (14 mi)	MPC · JPL
859 Bouzaréah	1916 c	Bouzaréah	October 2, 1916	Algiers	F. Sy	·	65 km (40 mi)	MPC · JPL
860 Ursina	1917 BD	Ursina	January 22, 1917	Heidelberg	M. F. Wolf	·	35 km (22 mi)	MPC · JPL
861 Aïda	1917 BE	Aïda	January 22, 1917	Heidelberg	M. F. Wolf	·	67 km (42 mi)	MPC · JPL
862 Franzia	1917 BF	Franzia	January 28, 1917	Heidelberg	M. F. Wolf	·	27 km (17 mi)	MPC · JPL
863 Benkoela	1917 BH	Benkoela	February 9, 1917	Heidelberg	M. F. Wolf	·	39 km (24 mi)	MPC · JPL
864 Aase	1921 KE	Aase	September 30, 1921	Heidelberg	K. Reinmuth	·	7.2 km (4.5 mi)	MPC · JPL
865 Zubaida	1917 BO	Zubaida	February 15, 1917	Heidelberg	M. F. Wolf	PHO	18 km (11 mi)	MPC · JPL
866 Fatme	1917 BQ	Fatme	February 25, 1917	Heidelberg	M. F. Wolf	·	78 km (48 mi)	MPC · JPL
867 Kovacia	1917 BS	Kovacia	February 25, 1917	Vienna	J. Palisa	·	24 km (15 mi)	MPC · JPL
868 Lova	1917 BU	Lova	April 26, 1917	Heidelberg	M. F. Wolf	·	51 km (32 mi)	MPC · JPL
869 Mellena	1917 BV	Mellena	May 9, 1917	Hamburg-Bergedorf	R. Schorr	·	21 km (13 mi)	MPC · JPL
870 Manto	1917 BX	Manto	May 12, 1917	Heidelberg	M. F. Wolf	slow	14 km (8.7 mi)	MPC · JPL
871 Amneris	1917 BY	Amneris	May 14, 1917	Heidelberg	M. F. Wolf	·	8.0 km (5.0 mi)	MPC · JPL
872 Holda	1917 BZ	Holda	May 21, 1917	Heidelberg	M. F. Wolf	·	34 km (21 mi)	MPC · JPL
873 Mechthild	1917 CA	Mechthild	May 21, 1917	Heidelberg	M. F. Wolf	·	34 km (21 mi)	MPC · JPL
874 Rotraut	1917 CC	Rotraut	May 25, 1917	Heidelberg	M. F. Wolf	·	58 km (36 mi)	MPC · JPL
875 Nymphe	1917 CF	Nymphe	May 19, 1917	Heidelberg	M. F. Wolf	MAR	14 km (8.7 mi)	MPC · JPL
876 Scott	1917 CH	Scott	June 20, 1917	Vienna	J. Palisa	EOS	22 km (14 mi)	MPC · JPL
877 Walküre	Σ 7	Walküre	September 13, 1915	Crimea-Simeis	G. N. Neujmin	·	38 km (24 mi)	MPC · JPL
878 Mildred	1916 f	Mildred	September 6, 1916	Mount Wilson	S. B. Nicholson	NYS	2.5 km (1.6 mi)	MPC · JPL
879 Ricarda	1917 CJ	Ricarda	July 22, 1917	Heidelberg	M. F. Wolf	MAR · slow	18 km (11 mi)	MPC · JPL
880 Herba	1917 CK	Herba	July 22, 1917	Heidelberg	M. F. Wolf	·	32 km (20 mi)	MPC · JPL
881 Athene	1917 CL	Athene	July 22, 1917	Heidelberg	M. F. Wolf	·	12 km (7.5 mi)	MPC · JPL
882 Swetlana	1917 CM	Swetlana	August 15, 1917	Crimea-Simeis	G. N. Neujmin	·	42 km (26 mi)	MPC · JPL
883 Matterania	1917 CP	Matterania	September 14, 1917	Heidelberg	M. F. Wolf	(883)	7.0 km (4.3 mi)	MPC · JPL
884 Priamus	1917 CQ	Priamus	September 22, 1917	Heidelberg	M. F. Wolf	L5	101 km (63 mi)	MPC · JPL
885 Ulrike	1917 CX	Ulrike	September 23, 1917	Crimea-Simeis	S. Belyavsky	THM	31 km (19 mi)	MPC · JPL
886 Washingtonia	1917 b	Washingtonia	November 16, 1917	Washington	G. H. Peters	·	87 km (54 mi)	MPC · JPL
887 Alinda	1918 DB	Alinda	January 3, 1918	Heidelberg	M. F. Wolf	AMO +1 km (0.62 mi) · (887)	4.2 km (2.6 mi)	MPC · JPL
888 Parysatis	1918 DC	Parysatis	February 2, 1918	Heidelberg	M. F. Wolf	·	45 km (28 mi)	MPC · JPL
889 Erynia	1918 DG	Erynia	March 5, 1918	Heidelberg	M. F. Wolf	·	17 km (11 mi)	MPC · JPL
890 Waltraut	1918 DK	Waltraut	March 11, 1918	Heidelberg	M. F. Wolf	EOS	28 km (17 mi)	MPC · JPL
891 Gunhild	1918 DQ	Gunhild	May 17, 1918	Heidelberg	M. F. Wolf	·	56 km (35 mi)	MPC · JPL
892 Seeligeria	1918 DR	Seeligeria	May 31, 1918	Heidelberg	M. F. Wolf	·	74 km (46 mi)	MPC · JPL
893 Leopoldina	1918 DS	Leopoldina	May 31, 1918	Heidelberg	M. F. Wolf	·	86 km (53 mi)	MPC · JPL
894 Erda	1918 DT	Erda	June 4, 1918	Heidelberg	M. F. Wolf	·	28 km (17 mi)	MPC · JPL
895 Helio	1918 DU	Helio	July 11, 1918	Heidelberg	M. F. Wolf	(895)	110 km (68 mi)	MPC · JPL
896 Sphinx	1918 DV	Sphinx	August 1, 1918	Heidelberg	M. F. Wolf	·	12 km (7.5 mi)	MPC · JPL
897 Lysistrata	1918 DZ	Lysistrata	August 3, 1918	Heidelberg	M. F. Wolf	MAR	24 km (15 mi)	MPC · JPL
898 Hildegard	1918 EA	Hildegard	August 3, 1918	Heidelberg	M. F. Wolf	·	12 km (7.5 mi)	MPC · JPL
899 Jokaste	1918 EB	Jokaste	August 3, 1918	Heidelberg	M. F. Wolf	·	31 km (19 mi)	MPC · JPL
900 Rosalinde	1918 EC	Rosalinde	August 10, 1918	Heidelberg	M. F. Wolf	·	20 km (12 mi)	MPC · JPL

== 901–1000 ==
back to top

Designation			Discovery			Properties		Ref
Permanent	Provisional	Named after	Date	Site	Discoverer(s)	Category	Diam.	Ref
901 Brunsia	1918 EE	Brunsia	August 30, 1918	Heidelberg	M. F. Wolf	·	13 km (8.1 mi)	MPC · JPL
902 Probitas	1918 EJ	Probitas	September 3, 1918	Vienna	J. Palisa	·	8.6 km (5.3 mi)	MPC · JPL
903 Nealley	1918 EM	Nealley	September 13, 1918	Vienna	J. Palisa	·	58 km (36 mi)	MPC · JPL
904 Rockefellia	1918 EO	Rockefellia	October 29, 1918	Heidelberg	M. F. Wolf	·	49 km (30 mi)	MPC · JPL
905 Universitas	1918 ES	Universitas	October 30, 1918	Hamburg-Bergedorf	A. Schwassmann	·	12 km (7.5 mi)	MPC · JPL
906 Repsolda	1918 ET	Repsolda	October 30, 1918	Hamburg-Bergedorf	A. Schwassmann	·	66 km (41 mi)	MPC · JPL
907 Rhoda	1918 EU	Rhoda	November 12, 1918	Heidelberg	M. F. Wolf	·	83 km (52 mi)	MPC · JPL
908 Buda	1918 EX	Buda	November 30, 1918	Heidelberg	M. F. Wolf	PHO	31 km (19 mi)	MPC · JPL
909 Ulla	1919 FA	Ulla	February 7, 1919	Heidelberg	K. Reinmuth	ULA · CYB	116 km (72 mi)	MPC · JPL
910 Anneliese	1919 FB	Anneliese	March 1, 1919	Heidelberg	K. Reinmuth	·	49 km (30 mi)	MPC · JPL
911 Agamemnon	1919 FD	Agamemnon	March 19, 1919	Heidelberg	K. Reinmuth	L4	131 km (81 mi)	MPC · JPL
912 Maritima	1919 FJ	Maritima	April 27, 1919	Hamburg-Bergedorf	A. Schwassmann	slow	83 km (52 mi)	MPC · JPL
913 Otila	1919 FL	Otila	May 19, 1919	Heidelberg	K. Reinmuth	·	12 km (7.5 mi)	MPC · JPL
914 Palisana	1919 FN	Palisana	July 4, 1919	Heidelberg	M. F. Wolf	PHO	76 km (47 mi)	MPC · JPL
915 Cosette	1918 b	Cosette	December 14, 1918	Algiers	F. Gonnessiat	·	12 km (7.5 mi)	MPC · JPL
916 America	Σ 1	America	August 7, 1915	Crimea-Simeis	G. N. Neujmin	·	33 km (21 mi)	MPC · JPL
917 Lyka	Σ 4	Lyka	September 5, 1915	Crimea-Simeis	G. N. Neujmin	·	35 km (22 mi)	MPC · JPL
918 Itha	1919 FR	Itha	August 22, 1919	Heidelberg	K. Reinmuth	·	22 km (14 mi)	MPC · JPL
919 Ilsebill	1918 EQ	Ilsebill	October 30, 1918	Heidelberg	M. F. Wolf	·	34 km (21 mi)	MPC · JPL
920 Rogeria	1919 FT	Rogeria	September 1, 1919	Heidelberg	K. Reinmuth	·	27 km (17 mi)	MPC · JPL
921 Jovita	1919 FV	Jovita	September 4, 1919	Heidelberg	K. Reinmuth	·	55 km (34 mi)	MPC · JPL
922 Schlutia	1919 FW	Schlutia	September 18, 1919	Heidelberg	K. Reinmuth	·	19 km (12 mi)	MPC · JPL
923 Herluga	1919 GB	Herluga	September 30, 1919	Heidelberg	K. Reinmuth	·	35 km (22 mi)	MPC · JPL
924 Toni	1919 GC	Toni	October 20, 1919	Heidelberg	K. Reinmuth	·	85 km (53 mi)	MPC · JPL
925 Alphonsina	1920 GM	Alphonsina	January 13, 1920	Barcelona	J. Comas i Solà	·	58 km (36 mi)	MPC · JPL
926 Imhilde	1920 GN	Imhilde	February 15, 1920	Heidelberg	K. Reinmuth	·	48 km (30 mi)	MPC · JPL
927 Ratisbona	1920 GO	Ratisbona	February 16, 1920	Heidelberg	M. F. Wolf	·	76 km (47 mi)	MPC · JPL
928 Hildrun	1920 GP	Hildrun	February 23, 1920	Heidelberg	K. Reinmuth	·	63 km (39 mi)	MPC · JPL
929 Algunde	1920 GR	Algunde	March 10, 1920	Heidelberg	K. Reinmuth	·	11 km (6.8 mi)	MPC · JPL
930 Westphalia	1920 GS	Westphalia	March 10, 1920	Hamburg-Bergedorf	W. Baade	PHO · slow	35 km (22 mi)	MPC · JPL
931 Whittemora	1920 GU	Whittemora	March 19, 1920	Algiers	F. Gonnessiat	·	45 km (28 mi)	MPC · JPL
932 Hooveria	1920 GV	Hooveria	March 23, 1920	Vienna	J. Palisa	·	59 km (37 mi)	MPC · JPL
933 Susi	1927 CH	Susi	February 10, 1927	Heidelberg	K. Reinmuth	ERI	22 km (14 mi)	MPC · JPL
934 Thüringia	1920 HK	Thüringia	August 15, 1920	Hamburg-Bergedorf	W. Baade	·	54 km (34 mi)	MPC · JPL
935 Clivia	1920 HM	Clivia	September 7, 1920	Heidelberg	K. Reinmuth	·	6.4 km (4.0 mi)	MPC · JPL
936 Kunigunde	1920 HN	Kunigunde	September 8, 1920	Heidelberg	K. Reinmuth	THM ·	43 km (27 mi)	MPC · JPL
937 Bethgea	1920 HO	Bethgea	September 12, 1920	Heidelberg	K. Reinmuth	·	11 km (6.8 mi)	MPC · JPL
938 Chlosinde	1920 HQ	Chlosinde	September 9, 1920	Heidelberg	K. Reinmuth	THM	33 km (21 mi)	MPC · JPL
939 Isberga	1920 HR	Isberga	October 4, 1920	Heidelberg	K. Reinmuth	moon	10 km (6.2 mi)	MPC · JPL
940 Kordula	1920 HT	Kordula	October 10, 1920	Heidelberg	K. Reinmuth	CYB	80 km (50 mi)	MPC · JPL
941 Murray	1920 HV	Murray	October 10, 1920	Vienna	J. Palisa	·	18 km (11 mi)	MPC · JPL
942 Romilda	1920 HW	Romilda	October 11, 1920	Heidelberg	K. Reinmuth	·	37 km (23 mi)	MPC · JPL
943 Begonia	1920 HX	Begonia	October 20, 1920	Heidelberg	K. Reinmuth	·	71 km (44 mi)	MPC · JPL
944 Hidalgo	1920 HZ	Hidalgo	October 31, 1920	Hamburg-Bergedorf	W. Baade	T_{j} (2.07) · unusual	38 km (24 mi)	MPC · JPL
945 Barcelona	1921 JB	Barcelona	February 3, 1921	Barcelona	J. Comas i Solà	BAR	26 km (16 mi)	MPC · JPL
946 Poësia	1921 JC	Poësia	February 11, 1921	Heidelberg	M. F. Wolf	THM · slow	36 km (22 mi)	MPC · JPL
947 Monterosa	1921 JD	Monterosa	February 8, 1921	Hamburg-Bergedorf	A. Schwassmann	·	26 km (16 mi)	MPC · JPL
948 Jucunda	1921 JE	Jucunda	March 3, 1921	Heidelberg	K. Reinmuth	·	17 km (11 mi)	MPC · JPL
949 Hel	1921 JK	Hel	March 11, 1921	Heidelberg	M. F. Wolf	·	63 km (39 mi)	MPC · JPL
950 Ahrensa	1921 JP	Ahrensa	April 1, 1921	Heidelberg	K. Reinmuth	PHO · slow	14 km (8.7 mi)	MPC · JPL
951 Gaspra	Σ 45	Gaspra	July 30, 1916	Crimea-Simeis	G. N. Neujmin	·	12 km (7.5 mi)	MPC · JPL
952 Caia	Σ 61	Caia	October 27, 1916	Crimea-Simeis	G. N. Neujmin	·	89 km (55 mi)	MPC · JPL
953 Painleva	1921 JT	Painleva	April 29, 1921	Algiers	B. Jekhovsky	·	24 km (15 mi)	MPC · JPL
954 Li	1921 JU	Li	August 4, 1921	Heidelberg	K. Reinmuth	THM	59 km (37 mi)	MPC · JPL
955 Alstede	1921 JV	Alstede	August 5, 1921	Heidelberg	K. Reinmuth	·	17 km (11 mi)	MPC · JPL
956 Elisa	1921 JW	Elisa	August 8, 1921	Heidelberg	K. Reinmuth	·	10 km (6.2 mi)	MPC · JPL
957 Camelia	1921 JX	Camelia	September 7, 1921	Heidelberg	K. Reinmuth	·	92 km (57 mi)	MPC · JPL
958 Asplinda	1921 KC	Asplinda	September 28, 1921	Heidelberg	K. Reinmuth	3:2	45 km (28 mi)	MPC · JPL
959 Arne	1921 KF	Arne	September 30, 1921	Heidelberg	K. Reinmuth	slow	45 km (28 mi)	MPC · JPL
960 Birgit	1921 KH	Birgit	October 1, 1921	Heidelberg	K. Reinmuth	·	7.5 km (4.7 mi)	MPC · JPL
961 Gunnie	1921 KM	Gunnie	October 10, 1921	Heidelberg	K. Reinmuth	·	37 km (23 mi)	MPC · JPL
962 Aslög	1921 KP	Aslög	October 25, 1921	Heidelberg	K. Reinmuth	KOR	20 km (12 mi)	MPC · JPL
963 Iduberga	1921 KR	Iduberga	October 26, 1921	Heidelberg	K. Reinmuth	·	9.0 km (5.6 mi)	MPC · JPL
964 Subamara	1921 KS	Subamara	October 27, 1921	Vienna	J. Palisa	·	20 km (12 mi)	MPC · JPL
965 Angelica	1921 KT	Angelica	November 4, 1921	La Plata Observatory	J. Hartmann	·	61 km (38 mi)	MPC · JPL
966 Muschi	1921 KU	Muschi	November 9, 1921	Hamburg-Bergedorf	W. Baade	EUN	26 km (16 mi)	MPC · JPL
967 Helionape	1921 KV	Helionape	November 9, 1921	Hamburg-Bergedorf	W. Baade	·	10 km (6.2 mi)	MPC · JPL
968 Petunia	1921 KW	Petunia	November 24, 1921	Heidelberg	K. Reinmuth	·	24 km (15 mi)	MPC · JPL
969 Leocadia	1921 KZ	Leocadia	November 5, 1921	Crimea-Simeis	S. Belyavsky	·	17 km (11 mi)	MPC · JPL
970 Primula	1921 LB	Primula	November 29, 1921	Heidelberg	K. Reinmuth	·	9.2 km (5.7 mi)	MPC · JPL
971 Alsatia	1921 LF	Alsatia	November 23, 1921	Nice	A. Schaumasse	·	61 km (38 mi)	MPC · JPL
972 Cohnia	1922 LK	Cohnia	January 18, 1922	Heidelberg	M. F. Wolf	·	78 km (48 mi)	MPC · JPL
973 Aralia	1922 LR	Aralia	March 18, 1922	Heidelberg	K. Reinmuth	URS	52 km (32 mi)	MPC · JPL
974 Lioba	1922 LS	Lioba	March 18, 1922	Heidelberg	K. Reinmuth	·	25 km (16 mi)	MPC · JPL
975 Perseverantia	1922 LT	Perseverantia	March 27, 1922	Vienna	J. Palisa	KOR	22 km (14 mi)	MPC · JPL
976 Benjamina	1922 LU	Benjamina	March 27, 1922	Algiers	B. Jekhovsky	·	83 km (52 mi)	MPC · JPL
977 Philippa	1922 LV	Philippa	April 6, 1922	Algiers	B. Jekhovsky	·	65 km (40 mi)	MPC · JPL
978 Aidamina	1922 LY	Aidamina	May 18, 1922	Crimea-Simeis	S. Belyavsky	·	92 km (57 mi)	MPC · JPL
979 Ilsewa	1922 MC	Ilsewa	June 29, 1922	Heidelberg	K. Reinmuth	·	36 km (22 mi)	MPC · JPL
980 Anacostia	1921 W 19	Anacostia	November 21, 1921	Washington	G. H. Peters	·	75 km (47 mi)	MPC · JPL
981 Martina	Σ 92	Martina	September 23, 1917	Crimea-Simeis	S. Belyavsky	THM	33 km (21 mi)	MPC · JPL
982 Franklina	1922 MD	Franklina	May 21, 1922	Johannesburg	H. E. Wood	slow	33 km (21 mi)	MPC · JPL
983 Gunila	1922 ME	Gunila	July 30, 1922	Heidelberg	K. Reinmuth	·	74 km (46 mi)	MPC · JPL
984 Gretia	1922 MH	Gretia	August 27, 1922	Heidelberg	K. Reinmuth	·	32 km (20 mi)	MPC · JPL
985 Rosina	1922 MO	Rosina	October 14, 1922	Heidelberg	K. Reinmuth	·	8.4 km (5.2 mi)	MPC · JPL
986 Amelia	1922 MQ	Amelia	October 19, 1922	Barcelona	J. Comas i Solà	·	49 km (30 mi)	MPC · JPL
987 Wallia	1922 MR	Wallia	October 23, 1922	Heidelberg	K. Reinmuth	·	53 km (33 mi)	MPC · JPL
988 Appella	1922 MT	Appella	November 10, 1922	Algiers	B. Jekhovsky	slow	20 km (12 mi)	MPC · JPL
989 Schwassmannia	1922 MW	Schwassmannia	November 18, 1922	Hamburg-Bergedorf	A. Schwassmann	slow	13 km (8.1 mi)	MPC · JPL
990 Yerkes	1922 MZ	Yerkes	November 23, 1922	Williams Bay	G. Van Biesbroeck	·	21 km (13 mi)	MPC · JPL
991 McDonalda	1922 NB	McDonalda	October 24, 1922	Williams Bay	O. Struve	THM	39 km (24 mi)	MPC · JPL
992 Swasey	1922 ND	Swasey	November 14, 1922	Williams Bay	O. Struve	·	28 km (17 mi)	MPC · JPL
993 Moultona	1923 NJ	Moultona	January 12, 1923	Williams Bay	G. Van Biesbroeck	KOR	12 km (7.5 mi)	MPC · JPL
994 Otthild	1923 NL	Otthild	March 18, 1923	Heidelberg	K. Reinmuth	·	21 km (13 mi)	MPC · JPL
995 Sternberga	1923 NP	Sternberga	June 8, 1923	Crimea-Simeis	S. Belyavsky	·	20 km (12 mi)	MPC · JPL
996 Hilaritas	1923 NM	Hilaritas	March 21, 1923	Vienna	J. Palisa	THM	29 km (18 mi)	MPC · JPL
997 Priska	1923 NR	Priska	July 12, 1923	Heidelberg	K. Reinmuth	ADE	20 km (12 mi)	MPC · JPL
998 Bodea	1923 NU	Bodea	August 6, 1923	Heidelberg	K. Reinmuth	·	32 km (20 mi)	MPC · JPL
999 Zachia	1923 NW	Zachia	August 9, 1923	Heidelberg	K. Reinmuth	·	17 km (11 mi)	MPC · JPL
1000 Piazzia	1923 NZ	Piazzia	August 12, 1923	Heidelberg	K. Reinmuth	·	48 km (30 mi)	MPC · JPL

back to top

== See also ==
- Meanings of minor-planet names: 1–1000
