= 421 Zähringia =

Main-belt asteroid

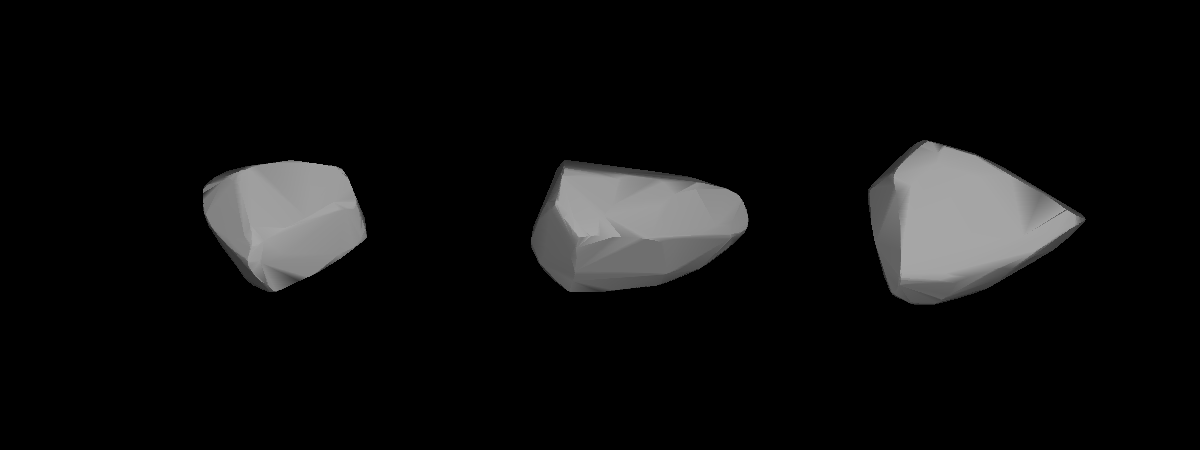
- Lightcurve-base 3D-model of 421 Zähringia.

Discovery
- Discovered by: M. F. Wolf
- Discovery site: Heidelberg Obs.
- Discovery date: 7 September 1896

Designations
- Named after: House of Zähringen (medieval noble family)
- Alternative designations: 1896 CZ · 1949 WJ; A908 OB
- Minor planet category: main-belt · (middle)

Orbital characteristics
- Epoch 4 September 2017 (JD 2458000.5)
- Uncertainty parameter 0
- Observation arc: 112.92 yr (41,243 days)
- Aphelion: 3.2604 AU
- Perihelion: 1.8203 AU
- Semi-major axis: 2.5404 AU
- Eccentricity: 0.2834
- Orbital period (sidereal): 4.05 yr (1,479 days)
- Mean anomaly: 297.47°
- Mean motion: 0° 14^{m} 36.24^{s} / day
- Inclination: 7.7854°
- Longitude of ascending node: 187.40°
- Argument of perihelion: 209.23°

Physical characteristics
- Dimensions: 14.119±0.320 km
- Synodic rotation period: 6.42 h (0.268 d)
- Geometric albedo: 0.172±0.027
- Spectral type: S (Tholen)
- Absolute magnitude (H): 11.78

421 Zähringia, provisional designation 1896 CZ, is a stony asteroid from the intermediate asteroid belt, approximately 14 kilometers in diameter. It was discovered on 7 September 1896, by astronomer Max Wolf at Heidelberg Observatory in Germany. The asteroid was named for the House of Zähringen, a medieval noble family that ruled parts of Swabia and Switzerland.

The first occultation of a star by 421 Zähringia was observed in 2021.
