= 552 Sigelinde =

Main-belt asteroid

Discovery
- Discovered by: M. F. Wolf
- Discovery site: Heidelberg
- Discovery date: 14 December 1904

Designations
- Pronunciation: German: [ˈziːɡəlɪndə]
- Alternative designations: 1904 PO

Orbital characteristics
- Epoch 31 July 2016 (JD 2457600.5)
- Uncertainty parameter 0
- Observation arc: 111.22 yr (40623 d)
- Aphelion: 3.4289 AU (512.96 Gm)
- Perihelion: 2.8723 AU (429.69 Gm)
- Semi-major axis: 3.1506 AU (471.32 Gm)
- Eccentricity: 0.088319
- Orbital period (sidereal): 5.59 yr (2042.6 d)
- Mean anomaly: 154.941°
- Mean motion: 0° 10^{m} 34.464^{s} / day
- Inclination: 7.6961°
- Longitude of ascending node: 266.936°
- Argument of perihelion: 348.530°

Physical characteristics
- Mean diameter: 88+10 −5 km (pole solution 1); 91+7 −13 km (pole solution 2)
- Synodic rotation period: 17.14963±0.00001 h (pole solution 1); 17.14962±0.00003 h (pole solution 2)
- Pole ecliptic longitude: 8° ± 24° or 189° ± 18°
- Pole ecliptic latitude: 73° ± 9° or 60° ± 17°
- Geometric albedo: 0.030+0.011 −0.007 (pole solution 1); 0.029+0.005 −0.007 (pole solution 2)
- Absolute magnitude (H): 9.6

552 Sigelinde is a minor planet orbiting the Sun.

It was named after a character in Richard Wagner's opera Die Walküre (The Valkyrie).
