= 1516 Henry =

Main-belt asteroid

Discovery
- Discovered by: A. Patry
- Discovery site: Nice Obs.
- Discovery date: 28 January 1938

Designations
- Named after: Paul and Prosper Henry (astronomers, opticians)
- Alternative designations: 1938 BG · 1938 DM
- Minor planet category: main-belt · (middle)

Orbital characteristics
- Epoch 4 September 2017 (JD 2458000.5)
- Uncertainty parameter 0
- Observation arc: 79.00 yr (28,854 days)
- Aphelion: 3.1087 AU
- Perihelion: 2.1368 AU
- Semi-major axis: 2.6227 AU
- Eccentricity: 0.1853
- Orbital period (sidereal): 4.25 yr (1,551 days)
- Mean anomaly: 216.91°
- Mean motion: 0° 13^{m} 55.2^{s} / day
- Inclination: 8.7440°
- Longitude of ascending node: 125.84°
- Argument of perihelion: 94.457°

Physical characteristics
- Dimensions: 19.19±4.31 km 19.92±1.7 km 19.98 km (derived); 26.163±0.138 km 26.442±0.150 km 27.70±8.84 km 28.55±0.36 km
- Synodic rotation period: 10 h 17.370±0.006 h
- Geometric albedo: 0.039±0.007; 0.0392±0.0045; 0.04±0.03; 0.042±0.001; 0.0536±0.011; 0.0701 (derived); 0.08±0.06
- Spectral type: S
- Absolute magnitude (H): 11.33±1.36 · 11.8 · 11.90 · 11.95 · 12.0 · 12.30

1516 Henry (provisional designation 1938 BG) is a stony asteroid from the middle region of the asteroid belt, approximately 20 kilometers in diameter. It was discovered on 28 January 1938, by French astronomer André Patry at Nice Observatory in southeastern France. It is named for French astronomers and opticians, Paul and Prosper Henry.

== Orbit and classification ==
The S-type asteroid orbits the Sun in the central main-belt at a distance of 2.1–3.1 AU once every 4 years and 3 months (1,551 days). Its orbit has an eccentricity of 0.19 and an inclination of 9° with respect to the ecliptic. No precoveries were taken, and no prior identifications were made. Henry's observation arc starts at Nice in August 1939, or 19 months after its official discovery observation.

== Physical characteristics ==
In May 2005, a rotational lightcurve of Henry was obtained by French amateur astronomer Christophe Demeautis. It gave a rotation period of 17.370 hours with a brightness variation of 0.54 magnitude (U=2). In February 2010, photometric observations by David Polishook and others at the Californian Palomar Transient Factory gave a divergent period of 10 hours with an amplitude of only 0.04 (U=2).

According to the surveys carried out by the Infrared Astronomical Satellite IRAS, the Japanese Akari satellite, and NASA's Wide-field Infrared Survey Explorer with its subsequent NEOWISE mission, Henry measures between 19.19 and 28.55 kilometers in diameter, and its surface has an albedo between 0.039 and 0.070. The Collaborative Asteroid Lightcurve Link derives an albedo of 0.0701 and a diameter of 19.98 kilometers with an absolute magnitude of 12.0.

== Naming ==
This minor planet is named for the two brothers Paul Henry and Prosper Henry (1848–1905 and 1849–1903, respectively), who each discovered seven asteroids. As opticians, they constructed the 76-cm refracting telescope at Nice Observatory, among others. While mapping the ecliptic during their Carte du Ciel survey, they made all their fourteen, low-numbered asteroid discoveries, starting with 125 Liberatrix.

The Henry Brothers are also honored by the lunar crater Henry Frères. The Martian crater Henry was named in honour of Paul. The official naming citation was published by the Minor Planet Center on 1 April 1978 (M.P.C. 4358).
