= Veleda (disambiguation) =

Veleda or Velleda may refer to:

- Veleda, a priestess and prophet of the Germanic tribe of the Bructeri
- Velléda, a cantata by Paul Dukas
- Velleda (beetle), a genus of beetles in the family Cerambycidae
- 126 Velleda, an asteroid
- Velleda, a work by Benedikte Naubert
- Velleda, a registered trademark of Société Bic, used for whiteboard markers
