= Tikhonravov (crater) =

Tikonravov
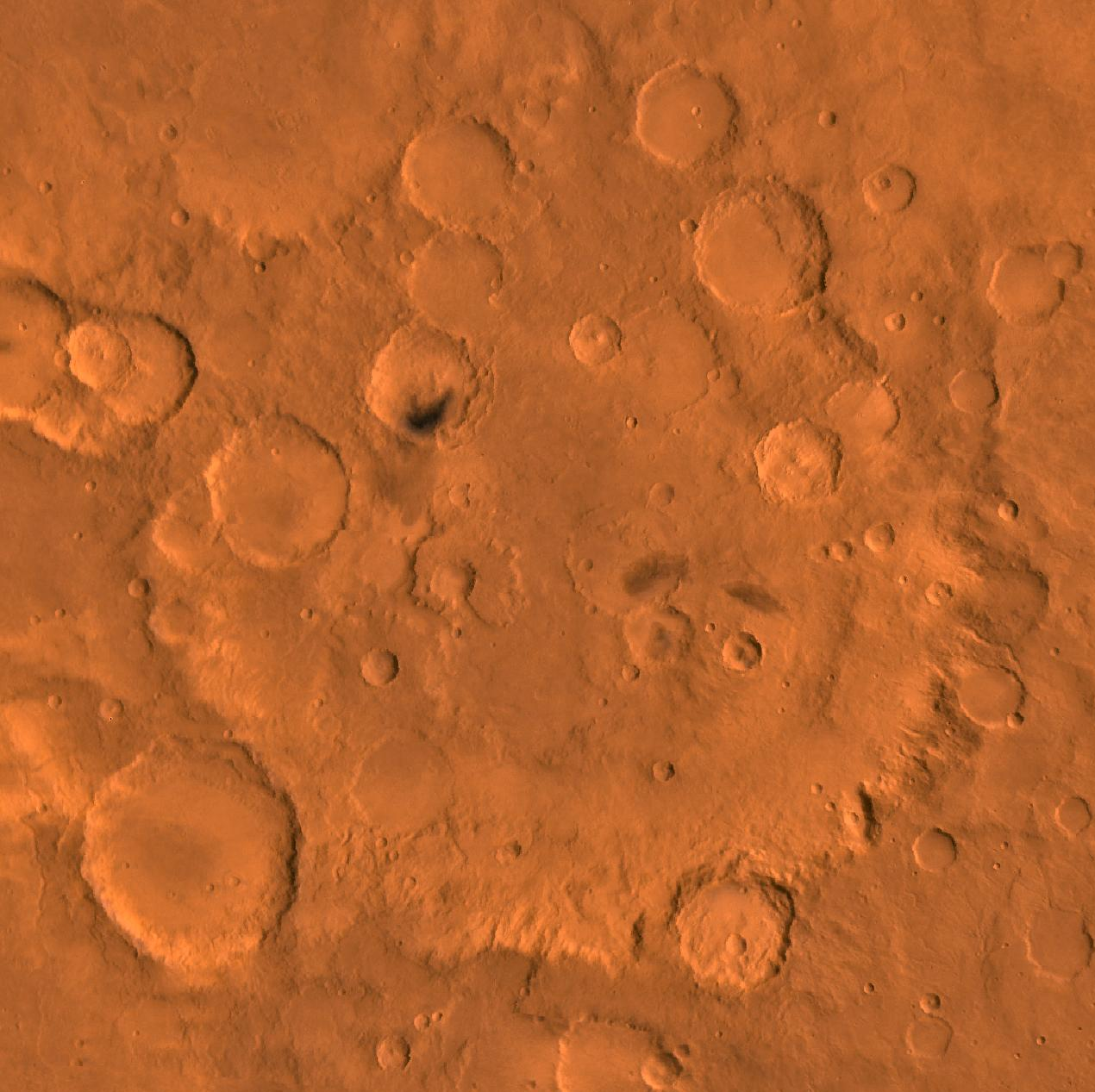
- Viking 1 Orbiter photo
- Planet: Mars
- Coordinates: 13.3°N 35.9°E
- Quadrangle: Arabia
- Diameter: 344 km (214 mi)
- Eponym: Mikhail Tikhonravov

Tikhonravov is a large, eroded crater in the Arabia quadrangle of Mars. It is 344 kilometres (214 mi) in diameter and was named after Mikhail Tikhonravov, a Russian rocket scientist. Tikhonravov is believed to have once held a giant lake that drained into the 4,500-kilometre-long (2,800 mi) Naktong-Scamander-Mamers lake-chain system. An inflow and outflow channel has been identified. Many craters once contained lakes.

== Pedestal craters ==
Some craters in Tikhonravov are classified as pedestal craters. A pedestal crater is a crater with its ejecta sitting above the surrounding terrain. They form when an impact crater ejects material which forms an erosion resistant layer, thus causing the immediate area to erode more slowly than the rest of the region. The result is that both the crater and its ejecta blanket stand above the surroundings.

== Gallery ==
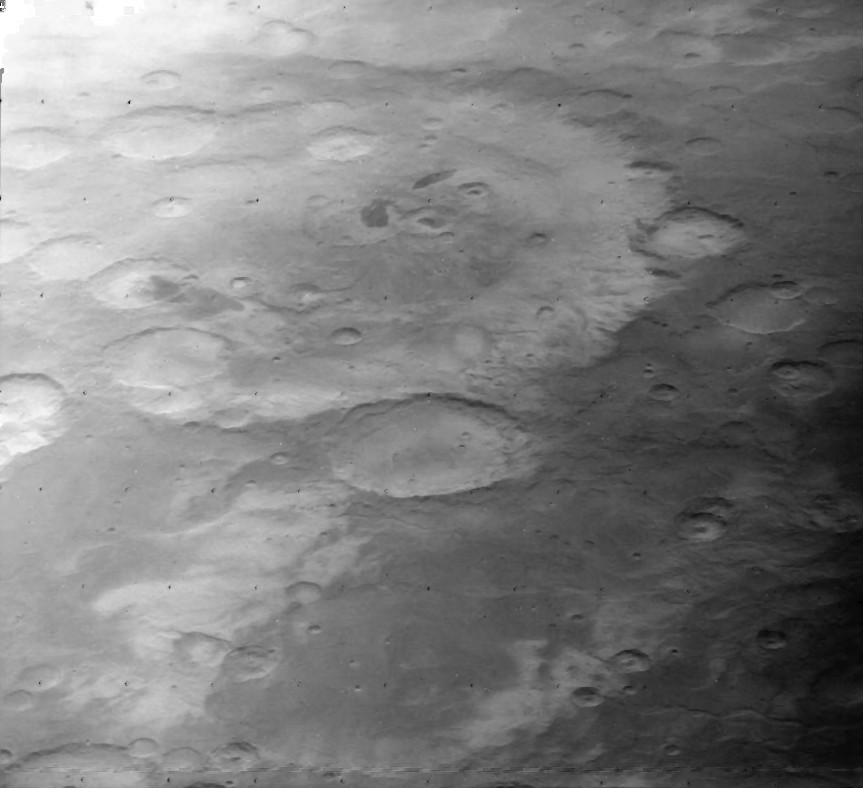
Oblique Viking Orbiter 1 view of Tikhonravov

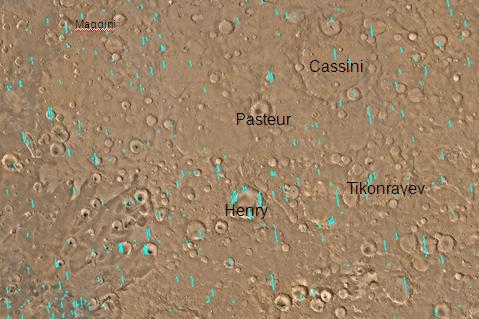
Map of Arabia quadrangle with major craters.

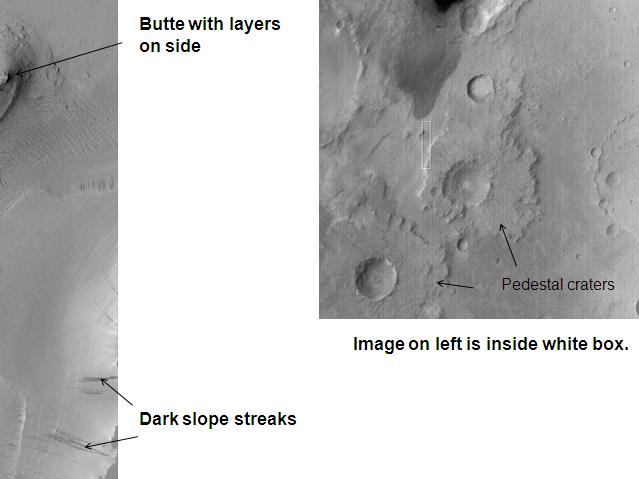
Tikhonravov crater floor, as seen by Mars Global Surveyor. Click on image to see dark slope streaks and layers.

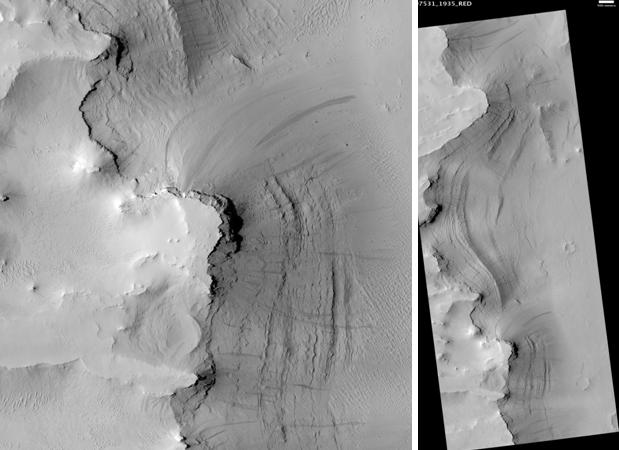
Streaks on side of pedestal crater in Tikhonravov, as seen by HiRISE. Scale bar is 500 meters long. Click on image to see close-up of the crater edge.

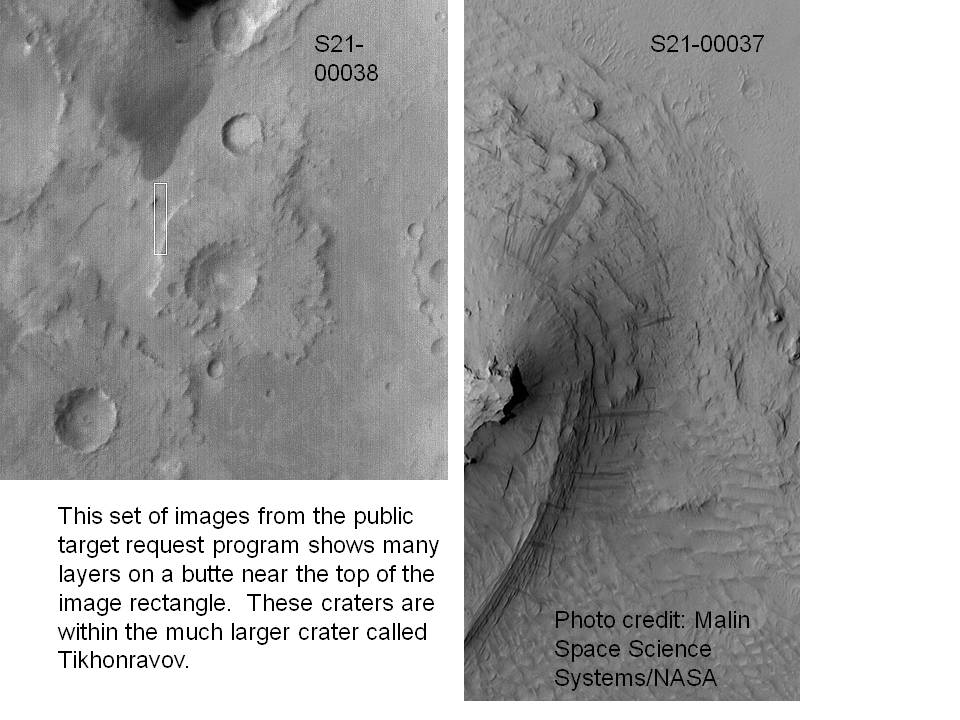
Close-up of layers in Tikhonravov in Arabia, as seen by Mars Global Surveyor, under the MOC Public Targeting Program. Layers may form from volcanoes, the wind, or by deposition under water. The craters on the left are pedestal craters.

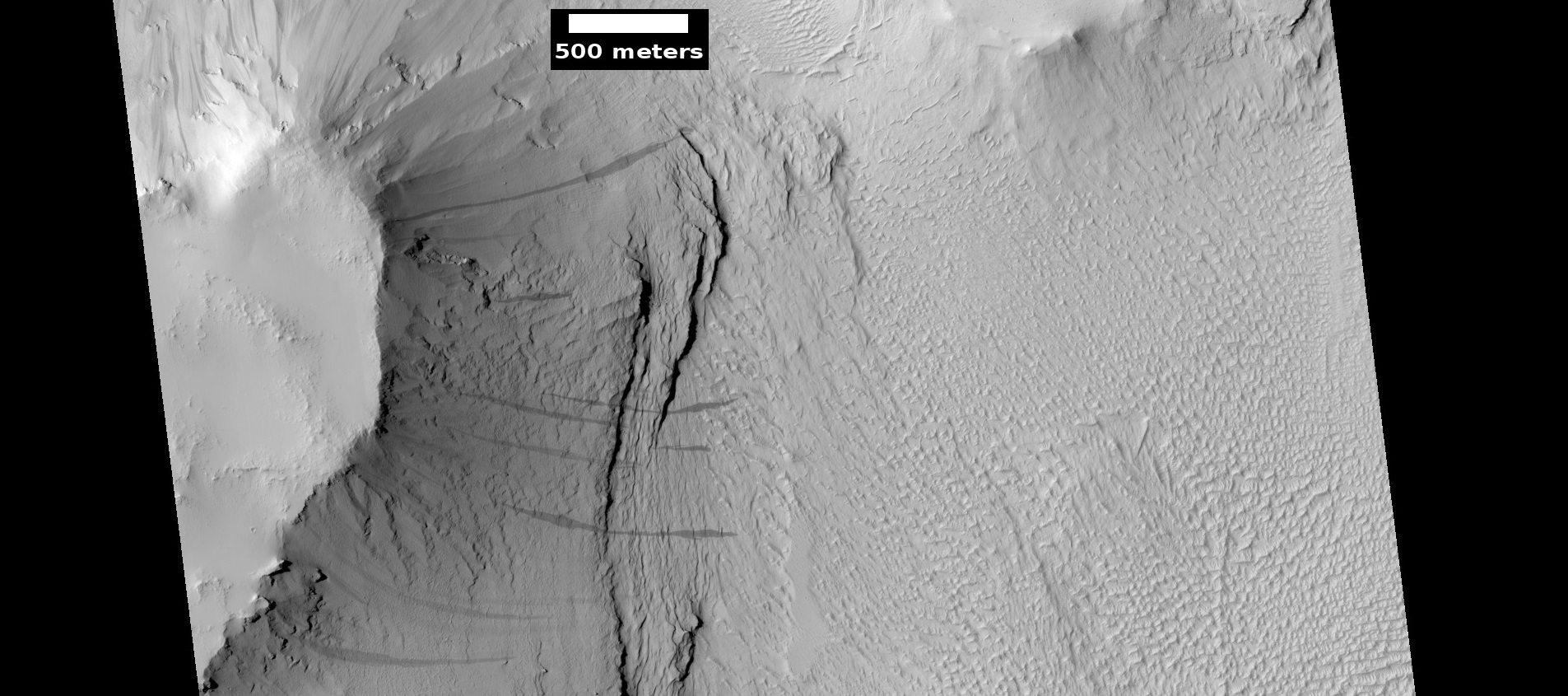
Layers under cap rock of a pedestal crater, as seen by HiRISE under HiWish program. Pedestal crater is within the much larger Tikhonravov Crater.

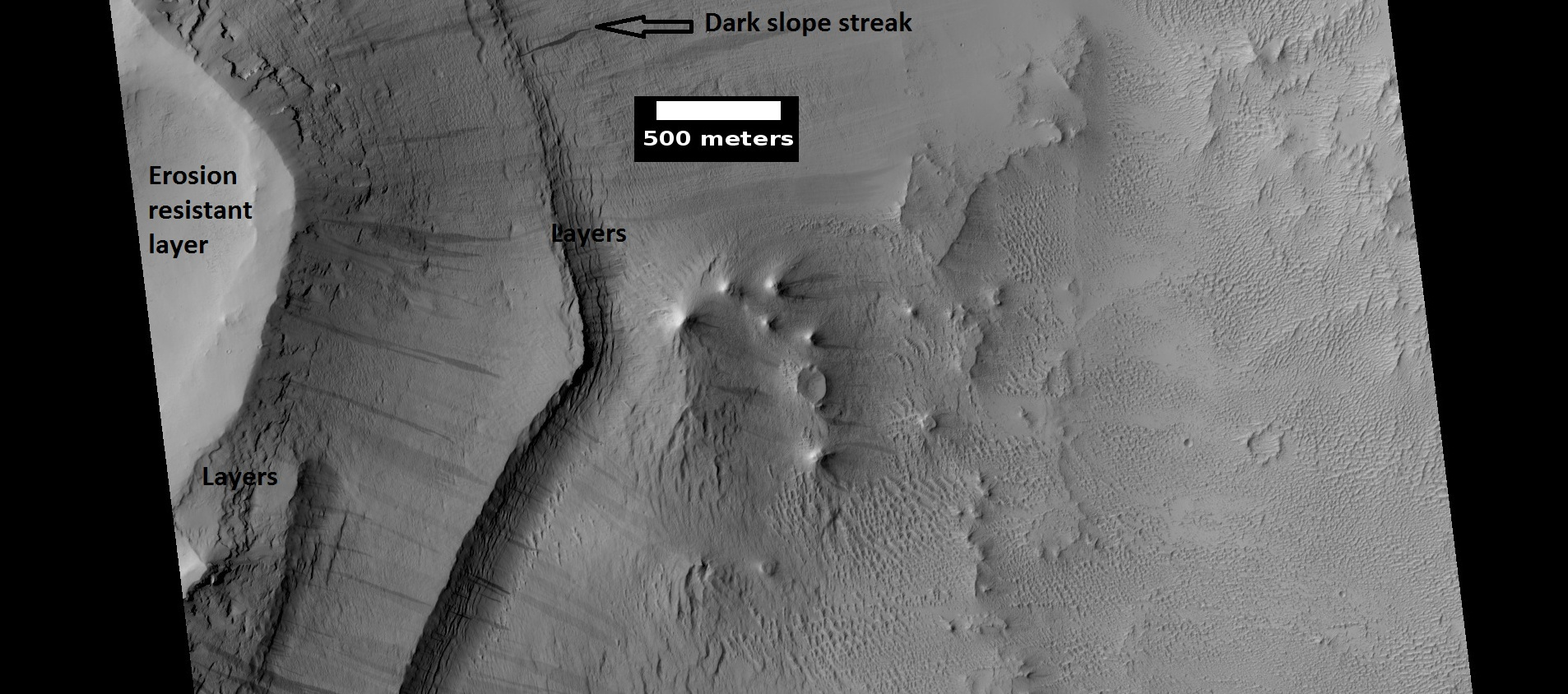
Layers under cap rock of a pedestal crater, as seen by HiRISE under HiWish program. Pedestal crater is within the much larger Tikhonravov.

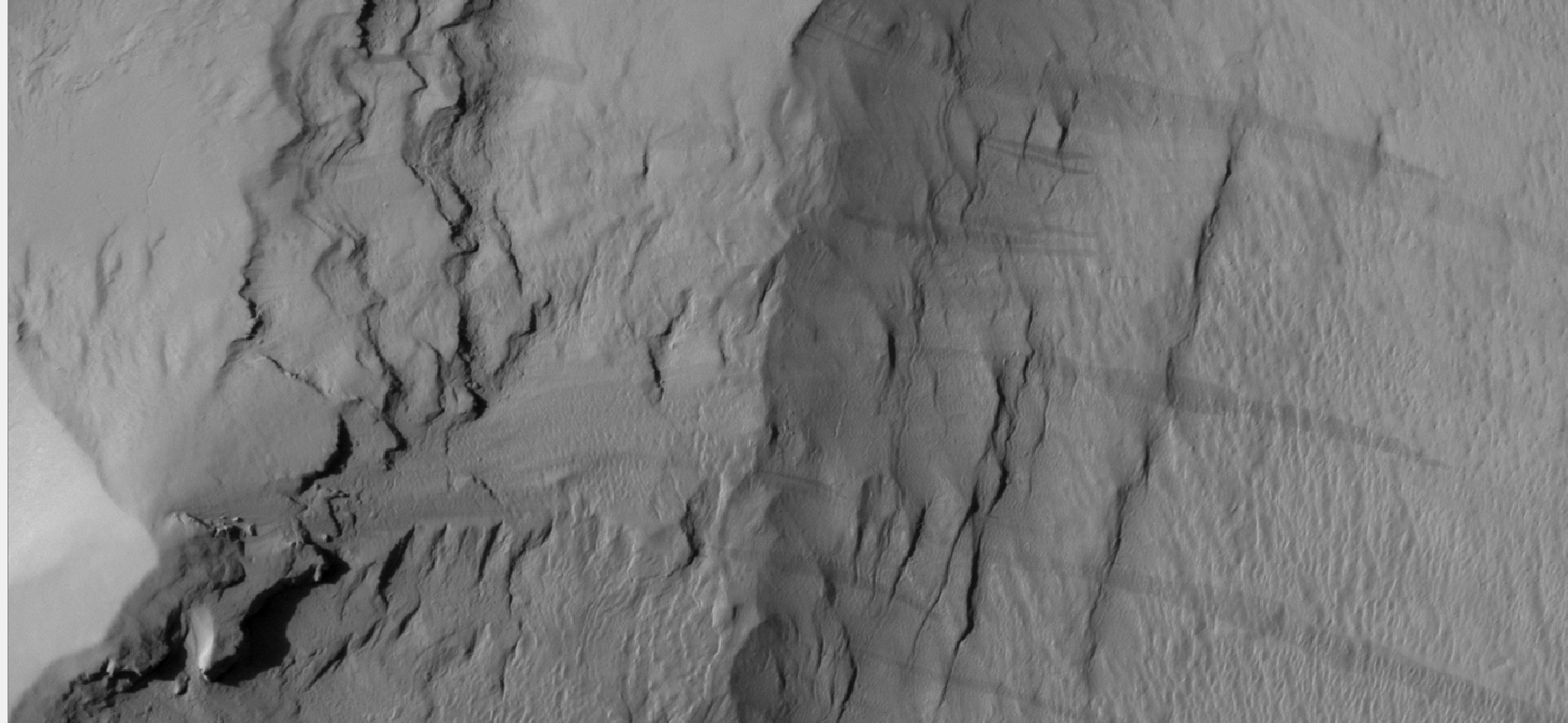
Close-up of some layers under cap rock of a pedestal crater, as seen by HiRISE under HiWish program.

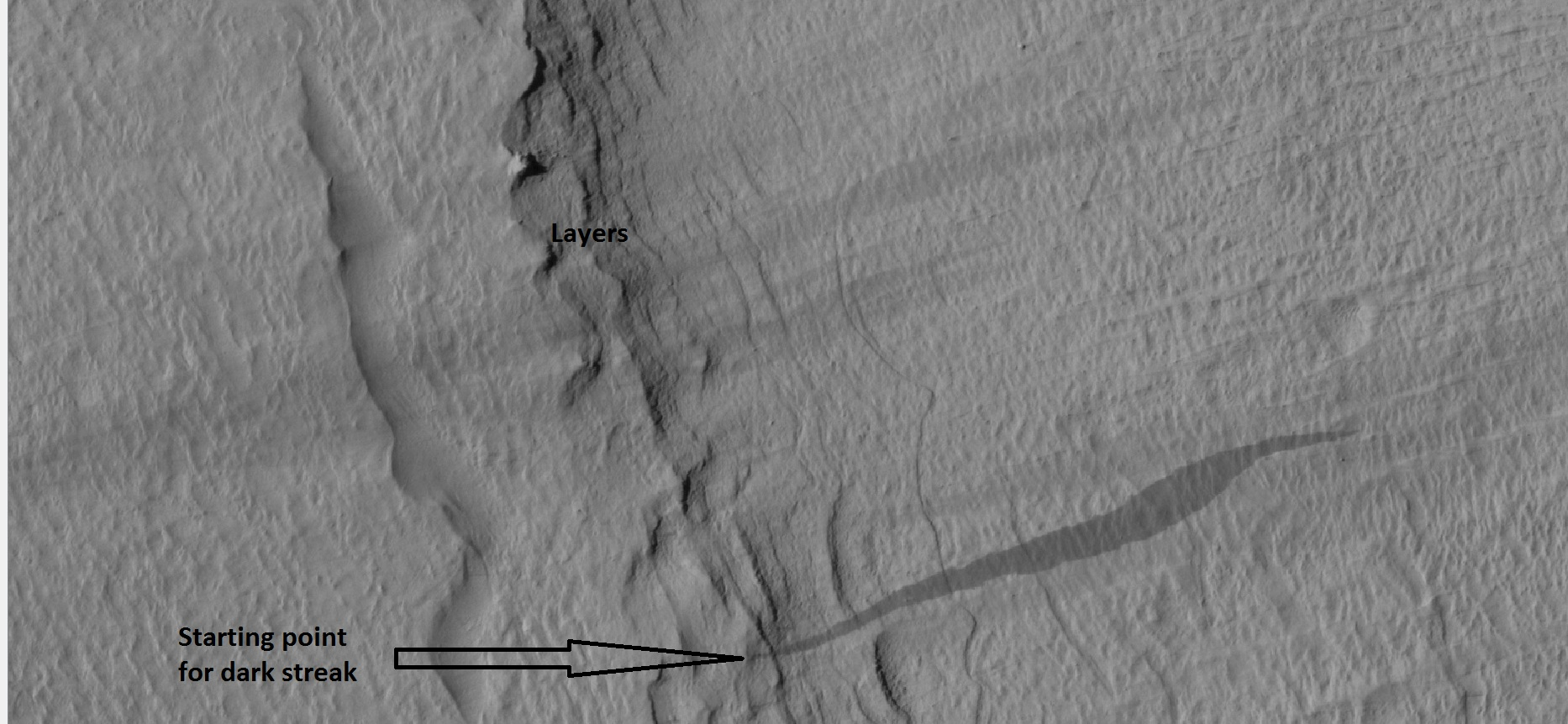
Close-up of some layers under cap rock of a pedestal crater and a dark slope streak, as seen by HiRISE under HiWish program.

== See also ==
- List of craters on Mars
