= Henry Frères =

Henry Frères may refer to:

- Paul Henry and Prosper Henry, French opticians and astronomers
- Henry Frères (crater), a lunar crater named after the above
