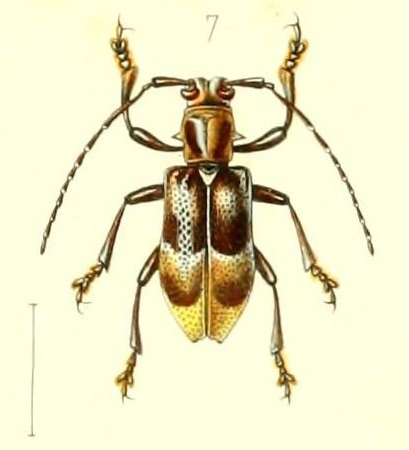
- V. murina.

Scientific classification
- Kingdom: Animalia
- Phylum: Arthropoda
- Class: Insecta
- Order: Coleoptera
- Suborder: Polyphaga
- Infraorder: Cucujiformia
- Family: Cerambycidae
- Tribe: Phrissomini
- Genus: Velleda; Thomson, 1858

Type species
- Velleda murina Thomson, 1858

= Velleda (beetle) =

Genus of beetles

Velleda is a genus of longhorn beetles of the subfamily Lamiinae, containing the following species:

- Velleda bassamensis (Breuning, 1936)
- Velleda callizona (Chevrolat, 1855)
- Velleda murina Thomson, 1858

Species formerly placed in this genus include:

- Falsovelleda congolensis (Hintz, 1911) Breuning, 1954
- Paravelleda aberrans (Duvivier, 1891)
