= Henry (lunar crater) =

Crater on the Moon

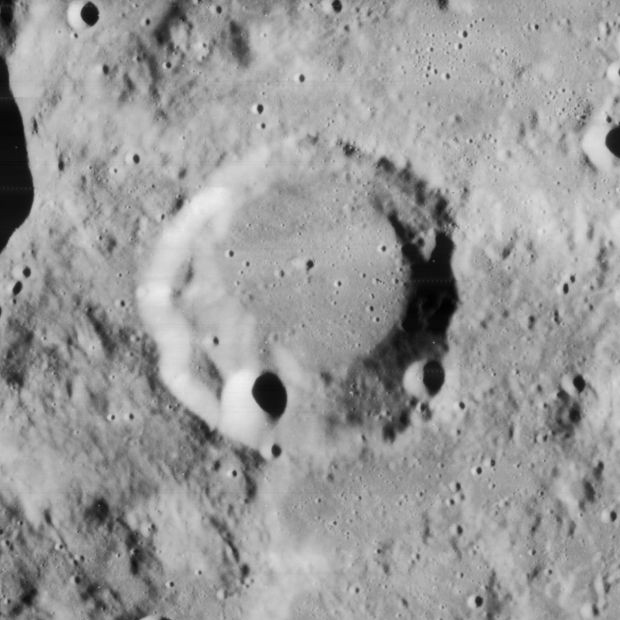
- Lunar Orbiter 4 image
- Coordinates: 24.0°S 56.8°W
- Diameter: 41 km
- Depth: 2.63 km
- Colongitude: 57° at sunrise
- Eponym: Joseph Henry

Henry is a lunar impact crater that is located to the northwest of the larger crater Cavendish, in the southeastern part of the Moon's near side. It was named after the Scottish-American scientist Joseph Henry. Less than a half diameter to the northwest is similar-sized crater Henry Frères, named for the brothers Paul and Prosper Henry.

The outer rim of Henry has undergone some impact erosion, particularly in the south and southeast where it is overlain by a pair of small craters. The former crater lies along the inner wall and part of the interior floor, with a rampart ridge to the north. The rim bulges outward slightly between these two depressions, and there are slight outward bulges to the north and northeast. The interior floor is relatively featureless, with an albedo that matches the surrounding terrain. A ray from Byrgius A, a satellite of Byrgius, crosses the northern half of the crater from west to east-northeast.

== Satellite craters ==
By convention these features are identified on lunar maps by placing the letter on the side of the crater midpoint that is closest to Henry.

Henry	Latitude	Longitude	Diameter
A	24.5° S	57.1° W	8 km
B	24.3° S	56.3° W	5 km
D	24.9° S	59.1° W	7 km
J	22.8° S	55.4° W	5 km
K	23.2° S	55.5° W	6 km
L	25.5° S	57.4° W	6 km
M	25.8° S	57.6° W	13 km
N	26.1° S	58.3° W	9 km
P	25.8° S	59.0° W	6 km
