= Paravelleda bispinosa =

Scientific classification
- Kingdom: Animalia
- Phylum: Arthropoda
- Class: Insecta
- Order: Coleoptera
- Suborder: Polyphaga
- Infraorder: Cucujiformia
- Family: Cerambycidae
- Genus: Paravelleda
- Species: P. bispinosa

Binomial name
- Paravelleda bispinosa (Aurivillius, 1910)

Species of beetle

Paravelleda bispinosa is a species of beetle in the family Cerambycidae. It was described by Per Olof Christopher Aurivillius in 1910.
