= Velleda bassamensis =

Scientific classification
- Kingdom: Animalia
- Phylum: Arthropoda
- Class: Insecta
- Order: Coleoptera
- Suborder: Polyphaga
- Infraorder: Cucujiformia
- Family: Cerambycidae
- Genus: Velleda
- Species: V. bassamensis

Binomial name
- Velleda bassamensis (Breuning, 1936)

Synonyms
- Parastixis bassamensis Breuning, 1936

Species of beetle

Velleda bassamensis is a species of beetle in the family Cerambycidae. It was described by Stephan von Breuning in 1936. It is known from the Ivory Coast and Ghana.
