= 154 Bertha =

Main-belt asteroid

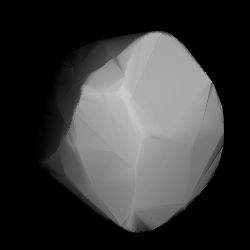

Discovery
- Discovered by: P. M. Henry
- Discovery date: 4 November 1875

Designations
- Pronunciation: /ˈbɜːrθə/
- Alternative designations: A875 VD
- Minor planet category: Main belt

Orbital characteristics
- Epoch 31 July 2016 (JD 2457600.5)
- Uncertainty parameter 0
- Observation arc: 130.75 yr (47758 d)
- Aphelion: 3.44 AU (515.21 Gm)
- Perihelion: 2.95 AU (441.30 Gm)
- Semi-major axis: 3.20 AU (478.26 Gm)
- Eccentricity: 0.077261
- Orbital period (sidereal): 5.72 years (2,087.9 d)
- Average orbital speed: 16.63 km/s
- Mean anomaly: 125.046°
- Mean motion: 0° 10^{m} 20.734^{s} / day
- Inclination: 20.9724°
- Longitude of ascending node: 36.7441°
- Argument of perihelion: 159.722°
- Earth MOID: 1.95 AU (291.94 Gm)
- Jupiter MOID: 1.53 AU (229.03 Gm)
- T_{Jupiter}: 3.087

Physical characteristics
- Mean diameter: 186.85±1.83 km (composite estimate); 184.93±3.6 km
- Mass: (5.0±1.1)×10^{18} kg (Note: Calculated from its standard gravitational parameter GM = 0.336±0.074 km^{3}/s^{2}.)
- Mean density: 1.35 g/cm^{3} (Note: Assuming a diameter of 193 km.)
- Equatorial surface gravity: 0.0517 m/s²
- Equatorial escape velocity: 0.0978 km/s
- Synodic rotation period: 25.224 h (1.0510 d)
- Geometric albedo: 0.0480±0.002; 0.0483 ± 0.0107
- Temperature: ~156 K
- Spectral type: C
- Absolute magnitude (H): 7.58, 7.530

154 Bertha is a main-belt asteroid. It was discovered by the French brothers Paul Henry and Prosper Henry on 4 November 1875, but the credit for the discovery was given to Prosper. It is probably named after Berthe Martin-Flammarion, sister of the astronomer Camille Flammarion.

Observations performed at the Palmer Divide Observatory in Colorado Springs, Colorado in during 2007 produced a light curve with a period of 22.30 ± 0.03 hours and a brightness range of 0.10 ± 0.02 in magnitude. A 1998 measurement gave a value of 27.6 hours, which doesn't fit the PDO data. In 2011, observations from the Organ Mesa Observatory in Las Cruces, New Mexico were used to determine a rotation period of 25.224 ± 0.002 hours with a brightness variability of 0.10 ± 0.01 magnitude, ruling out previous studies.

This is classified as a C-type asteroid and it has an estimated diameter of about 187 km.
