= Paravelleda =

Scientific classification
- Kingdom: Animalia
- Phylum: Arthropoda
- Class: Insecta
- Order: Coleoptera
- Suborder: Polyphaga
- Infraorder: Cucujiformia
- Family: Cerambycidae
- Tribe: Phrissomini
- Genus: Paravelleda; Breuning, 1936

Genus of beetles

Paravelleda is a genus of longhorn beetles of the subfamily Lamiinae, containing the following species:

- Paravelleda aberrans (Duvivier, 1891)
- Paravelleda bispinosa (Aurivillius, 1910)
- Paravelleda dentata (Hintz, 1911)
- Paravelleda gedeensis Adlbauer, 2010
- Paravelleda grisescens Breuning, 1949
- Paravelleda kenyensis Breuning, 1936
- Paravelleda nyassana Breuning, 1936
- Paravelleda orientalis Breuning, 1956
- Paravelleda pulchra Breuning, 1938
