= 164 Eva =

Main-belt asteroid

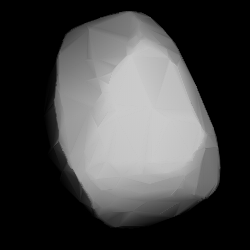
- 3D convex shape model of 164 Eva

Discovery
- Discovered by: P. P. Henry
- Discovery site: Paris
- Discovery date: 12 July 1876

Designations
- Pronunciation: /ˈiːvə/
- Named after: Unknown
- Alternative designations: A876 NA
- Minor planet category: Main belt

Orbital characteristics
- Epoch 31 July 2016 (JD 2457600.5)
- Uncertainty parameter 0
- Observation arc: 118.93 yr (43438 d)
- Aphelion: 3.5444 AU (530.23 Gm)
- Perihelion: 1.7188 AU (257.13 Gm)
- Semi-major axis: 2.6338 AU (394.01 Gm)
- Eccentricity: 0.34577
- Orbital period (sidereal): 4.27 yr (1561.2 d)
- Mean anomaly: 219.5472°
- Mean motion: 0° 13^{m} 50.128^{s} / day
- Inclination: 24.4564°
- Longitude of ascending node: 76.8519°
- Argument of perihelion: 283.9561°
- Earth MOID: 0.882286 AU (131.9881 Gm)
- Jupiter MOID: 2.44116 AU (365.192 Gm)
- T_{Jupiter}: 3.191

Physical characteristics
- Dimensions: 101.77 ± 3.61 km (composite estimate); 104.87±1.9 km
- Mass: (1.15±0.49)×10^{18} kg (Note: Calculated from its standard gravitational parameter GM = 0.077±0.033 km^{3}/s^{2}.)
- Mean density: 2.19 g/cm^{3} (Note: Assuming a diameter of 100 km.)
- Equatorial surface gravity: 2.249 cm/s (mean)
- Equatorial escape velocity: 4.857 cm/s (mean)
- Synodic rotation period: 13.66 h (0.569 d); 13.672 h
- Geometric albedo: 0.0447±0.002
- Temperature: 170 K (mean)
- Spectral type: C
- Absolute magnitude (H): 8.89, 8.84

164 Eva is a main-belt asteroid that was discovered by the French brothers Paul Henry and Prosper Henry on July 12, 1876, in Paris. The reason the name Eva was chosen remains unknown, though Karl Ludwig Littrow suspected a "worldly origin" ("Mit dem Namen könnten wir wie bei Miriam wieder den biblischen Boden zu betreten glauben, wenn wir bei diesem Entdecker nicht an Taufen weltlichen Ursprungs gewöhnt wären"). The orbital elements for 164 Eva were published in 1877 by American astronomer Winslow Upton.

This asteroid is categorized as a C-type asteroid and is probably composed of primitive carbonaceous chondritic materials. Dust activity due to sublimation has been detected on this asteroid, suggesting the presence of water ice in its interior.

This object has an estimated diameter of around 105 km. Photometric observations of this asteroid at the Palmer Divide Observatory in Colorado Springs, Colorado, during 2008 gave a light curve with a period of 13.672 ± 0.003 hours and a small brightness variation of 0.04 ± 0.01 in magnitude. This is consistent with a previous study reported in 1982 that listed a period estimate of 13.66 hours.

Between 2000 and 2021, 164 Eva has been observed to occult fourteen stars.

164 Eva is orbiting the Sun at a distance of 2.63 km with an eccentricity of 0.35 and an orbital period of 4.27 years. The orbital plane is inclined at an angle of 24.5° to the plane of the ecliptic. With a perihelion of 1.718 AU 164 Eva is the closest asteroid with a diameter over 100 kilometers to approach the orbit of Mars. Its closest approach is about 0.05 AU or about 19.5 lunar distances.
