= 152 Atala =

Main-belt asteroid

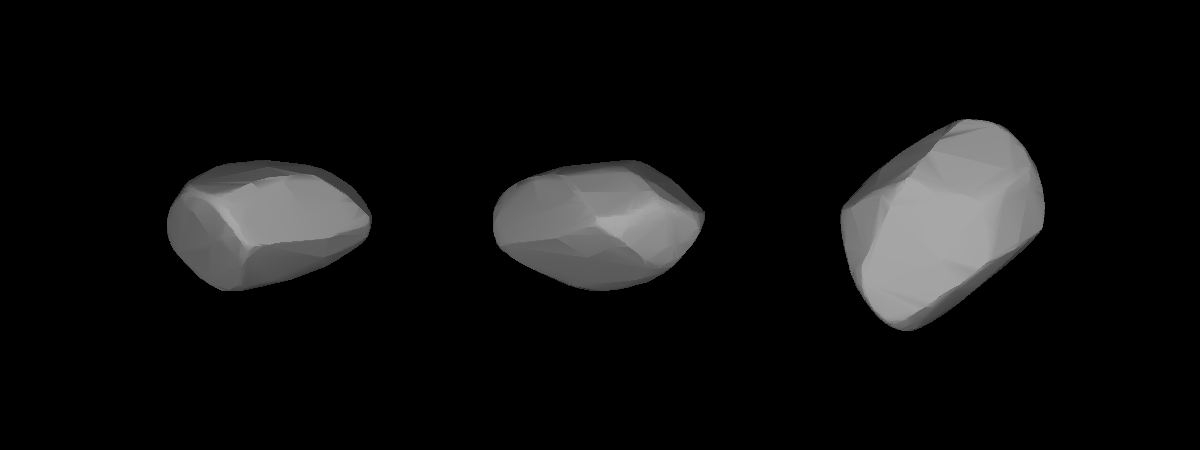
- A three-dimensional model of 152 Atala based on its lightcurve

Discovery
- Discovered by: P. P. Henry
- Discovery date: 2 November 1875

Designations
- Pronunciation: /əˈtɑːlə/ French: [atala]
- Named after: Atala
- Alternative designations: A875 VB
- Minor planet category: Main belt

Orbital characteristics
- Epoch 31 July 2016 (JD 2457600.5)
- Uncertainty parameter 0
- Observation arc: 130.69 yr (47735 d)
- Aphelion: 3.3855 AU (506.46 Gm)
- Perihelion: 2.8984 AU (433.59 Gm)
- Semi-major axis: 3.1420 AU (470.04 Gm)
- Eccentricity: 0.077507
- Orbital period (sidereal): 5.57 yr (2034.2 d)
- Mean anomaly: 52.593°
- Mean motion: 0° 10^{m} 37.092^{s} / day
- Inclination: 12.114°
- Longitude of ascending node: 39.945°
- Argument of perihelion: 59.807°
- Earth MOID: 1.93567 AU (289.572 Gm)
- Jupiter MOID: 1.85235 AU (277.108 Gm)
- T_{Jupiter}: 3.171

Physical characteristics
- Mean diameter: 82 ± 9 km/65 ± 8 km
- Mass: (5.43 ± 1.24) × 10^{18} kg
- Synodic rotation period: 6.24472 h (0.260197 d)
- Pole ecliptic longitude: 347°
- Pole ecliptic latitude: 47°
- Geometric albedo: 0.257 ± 0.018
- Spectral type: S (Bus/DeMeo); I (Tholen)
- Absolute magnitude (H): 8.36
- Angular diameter: 0.043″

152 Atala is a large main belt asteroid that was discovered by brothers Paul Henry and Prosper Henry on 2 November 1875, but the discovery was credited to Paul. It is a type D asteroid, meaning that it is composed of carbon, organic rich silicates and possibly water ice.

The asteroid is named for the eponymous heroine of the 1801 novella Atala by François-René de Chateaubriand. The Henry brothers also named the last of their discoveries, 186 Celuta, after another Chateaubriand heroine. Both Atala and Céluta are American Indian fictional characters.

An occultation of a star by Atala was observed from Japan on 11 March 1994. Subsequent occultations have been observed as recently as 2006.

Photometric of this asteroid made in 1981 gave a light curve with a period of 5.282 ± 0.004 hours with a brightness variation of 0.50 in magnitude.
