= Eduard Sobolewski =

Composer

Johann Friedrich Eduard Sobolewski (born Königsberg (Królewiec), October 1, 1804 or 1808 - died St. Louis, May 17, 1872) was a violinist, composer, and conductor.

Sobolewski studied with Carl Friedrich Zelter in Berlin, and with Carl Maria von Weber in Dresden between 1821 and 1824. He became music director at the Königsberg Theater in 1830. He was the founder and conductor of the Philharmonische Gesellschaft, which he established in 1838, as well as the founder of the Königsberg Musikalische Akademie, established 1843. From 1847 to 1853 he led the Königsberg Theater, after which he led the theater in Bremen. In 1859 he emigrated to Milwaukee, Wisconsin, and quickly founded the city's Philharmonic Society Orchestra alongside efforts to stage operas. In 1860 he moved to St. Louis and became conductor of their Philharmonic Society from 1860 to 1866. He was professor of vocal music from 1869 to his death in 1872 at the Bonham Female Seminary. He was buried at Bellefontaine Cemetery in St. Louis.

== Compositions ==
Note:this list is incomplete.

- Imogen, Opera, 1832
- Velleda, Opera, 1835 (see Veleda)
- Salvator Rosa, Opera, 1848
- Der Seher von Khorassan, Opera, 1850
- Comala, Opera, 1857
- Mohega, Opera, 1859
- Lazarus, Oratorio
- Johannes der Täufer, Oratorio
- Himmel und Erde, Oratorio
- Der Retter, Oratorio
- Süd und Nord, Symphony

== Writings ==
- Reactionary Letters, 1854
- Opera, Not Drama, 1857
- Debates About Music, 1857
- Chronicle of the newest School of Music, 1859
