= 127 Johanna =

Main-belt asteroid

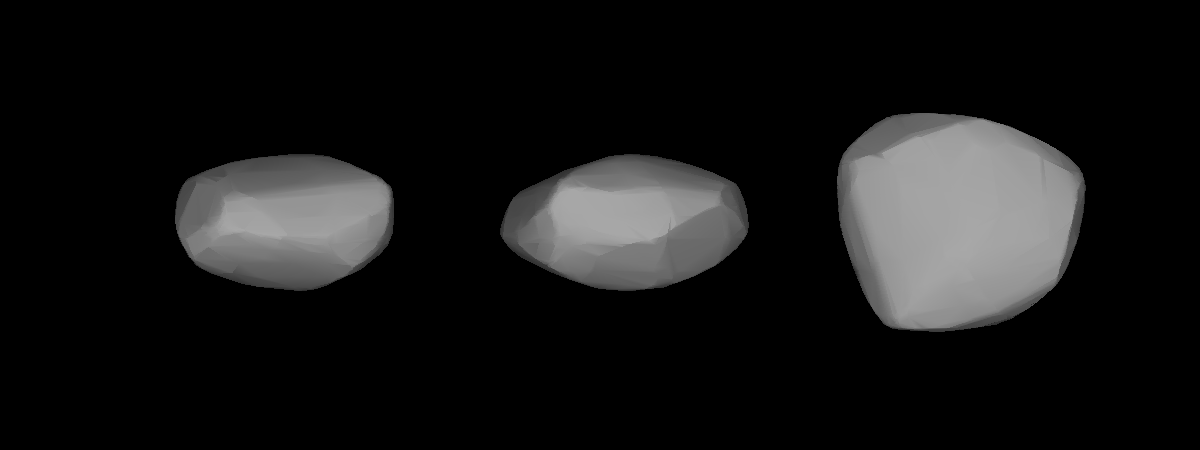
- A three-dimensional model of 127 Johanna based on its lightcurve

Discovery
- Discovered by: Paul Henry and Prosper Henry
- Discovery date: 5 November 1872

Designations
- Pronunciation: /dʒoʊˈhænə/
- Named after: Joan of Arc
- Alternative designations: A872 VB
- Minor planet category: Main belt

Orbital characteristics
- Epoch 31 July 2016 (JD 2457600.5)
- Uncertainty parameter 0
- Observation arc: 98.53 yr (35989 d)
- Aphelion: 2.94 AU (439.95 Gm)
- Perihelion: 2.57 AU (384.67 Gm)
- Semi-major axis: 2.76 AU (412.31 Gm)
- Eccentricity: 0.067041
- Orbital period (sidereal): 4.58 yr (1,671.3 d)
- Average orbital speed: 17.92 km/s
- Mean anomaly: 67.782°
- Mean motion: 0° 12^{m} 55.44^{s} / day
- Inclination: 8.2449°
- Longitude of ascending node: 31.154°
- Argument of perihelion: 94.611°
- Earth MOID: 1.60 AU (239.57 Gm)
- Jupiter MOID: 2.11 AU (315.95 Gm)
- T_{Jupiter}: 3.325

Physical characteristics
- Mean diameter: 120.04±0.05 km (composite estimate); 122 km
- Mass: (2.39 ± 0.997) × 10^{18} kg (composite estimate) (1.26±0.21)×10^{18} kg (Note: Calculated from its standard gravitational parameter GM = 0.084±0.014 km^{3}/s^{2}.)
- Mean density: 2.64±1.10 g/cm^{3} 1.32 g/cm^{3} (Note: Assuming a diameter of 122 km.)
- Synodic rotation period: 12.7988 h (0.53328 d)
- Geometric albedo: 0.0557±0.0039
- Temperature: ~168 K
- Spectral type: CX (Tholen); Ch (Bus)
- Absolute magnitude (H): 8.6, 8.30

127 Johanna is a large, dark main-belt asteroid that was discovered by French astronomers Paul Henry and Prosper Henry on 5 November 1872, and is believed to be named after Joan of Arc. It is classified as a CX-type asteroid, indicating the spectrum shows properties of both a carbonaceous C-type asteroid and a metallic X-type asteroid.

A photoelectric study was performed of this minor planet in 1991 at the Konkoly Observatory in Hungary. The resulting light curve showed a synodic rotation period of 6.94 ± 0.29 hours with a brightness variation of 0.2 in magnitude. It was estimated to have an absolute magnitude of 8.459 ± 0.013 with a diameter of 96–118 km (60–73 mi) and an albedo of 0.06–0.04.

Infrared observations made in 1982 at Konkoly showed a rapid variation that seemed to suggest a shorter rotation period of 1.5 hours; one of the fastest known at the time. However, an irregular shape was suggested as an alternative cause of the rapid variation. The present day established rotation period of this object is 12.7988 hours.

During 2001, 127 Johanna was observed by radar from the Arecibo Observatory. The return signal matched an effective diameter of 117 ± 21 km. A larger diameter value of 123.41 ± 4.07 km was obtained from the Midcourse Space Experiment observations, with an albedo of 0.0557 ± 0.0039. A 2012 study gave a refined diameter estimate of 116.14 ± 3.93 km.
