= 169 Zelia =

Main-belt asteroid

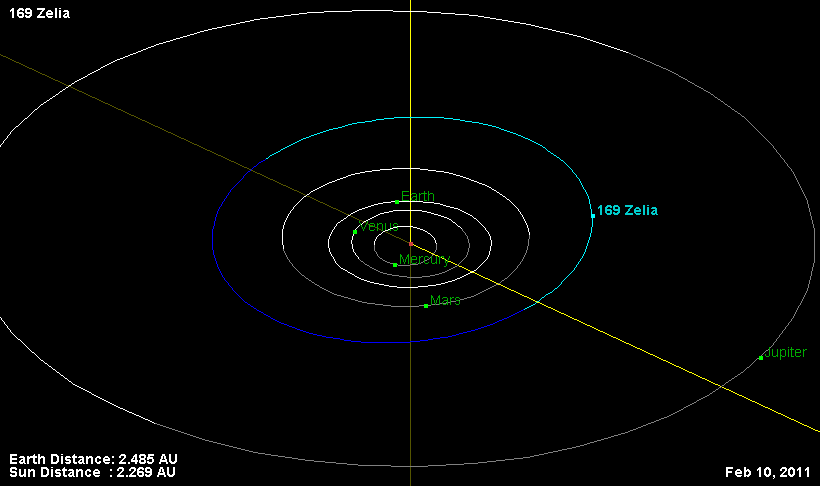
- Orbital diagram

Discovery
- Discovered by: P. M. Henry, 1876
- Discovery date: 28 September 1876

Designations
- Named after: Zelia Martin
- Alternative designations: A876 SB; 1933 FC_{2}
- Minor planet category: Main belt

Orbital characteristics
- Epoch 31 July 2016 (JD 2457600.5)
- Uncertainty parameter 0
- Observation arc: 131.26 yr (47944 d)
- Aphelion: 2.6662 AU (398.86 Gm)
- Perihelion: 2.0511 AU (306.84 Gm)
- Semi-major axis: 2.3586 AU (352.84 Gm)
- Eccentricity: 0.13040
- Orbital period (sidereal): 3.62 yr (1323.1 d)
- Mean anomaly: 249.62°
- Mean motion: 0° 16^{m} 19.524^{s} / day
- Inclination: 5.5001°
- Longitude of ascending node: 354.77°
- Argument of perihelion: 334.90°
- Earth MOID: 1.04119 AU (155.760 Gm)
- Jupiter MOID: 2.65309 AU (396.897 Gm)
- T_{Jupiter}: 3.535

Physical characteristics
- Mean radius: 16.80±1.3 km 19.3 ± 0.45 km
- Mass: (1.20±0.60)×10^{17} kg (Note: Calculated from its standard gravitational parameter GM = 0.008±0.004 km^{3}/s^{2}.)
- Mean density: 4.40 g/cm^{3} (Note: Assuming a diameter of 37.5 km.)
- Synodic rotation period: 14.537 h (0.6057 d)
- Geometric albedo: 0.178 ± 0.035; 0.2347±0.041
- Spectral type: O (Bus & Binzel)
- Absolute magnitude (H): 9.56

169 Zelia is a main belt asteroid that was discovered by the brothers Paul Henry and Prosper Henry on September 28, 1876. Credit for this discovery was given to Prosper. Initial orbital elements for this asteroid were published in 1877 by American astronomer H. A. Howe.

Based upon its spectrum, this body is classified as a rare O-type asteroid in the taxonomic system of Bus & Binzel. Photometric observations of this asteroid during 2009 gave a light curve with a period of 14.537 ± 0.001 hours and a brightness variation of 0.14 ± 0.03 in magnitude.

It was named for Zelia Martin, a niece of the astronomer Camille Flammarion.
