= Veleda =

1st century seeress of the Bructeri, a Germanic people

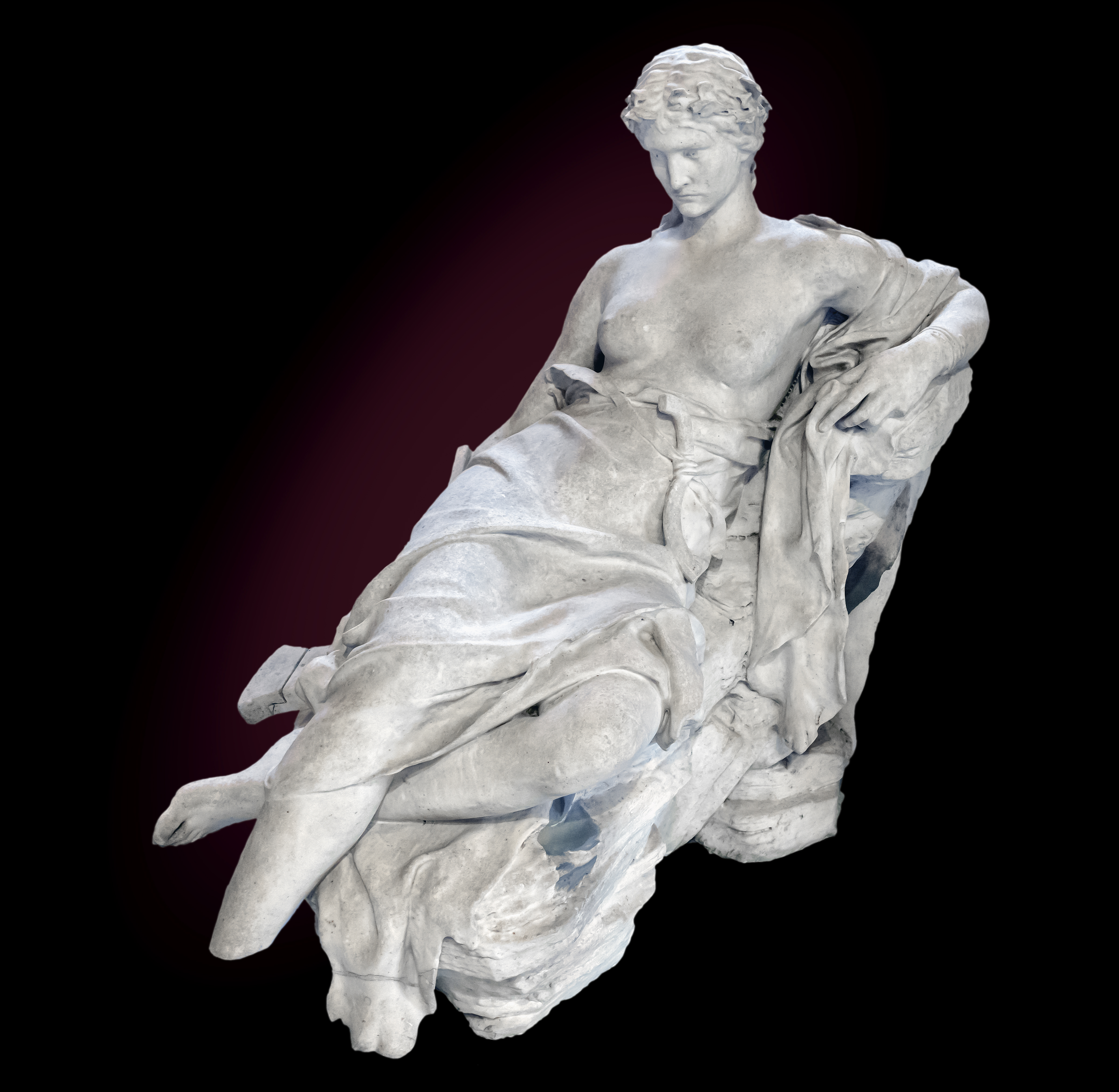
Statue of Veleda by Laurent Marqueste (c. 1877)

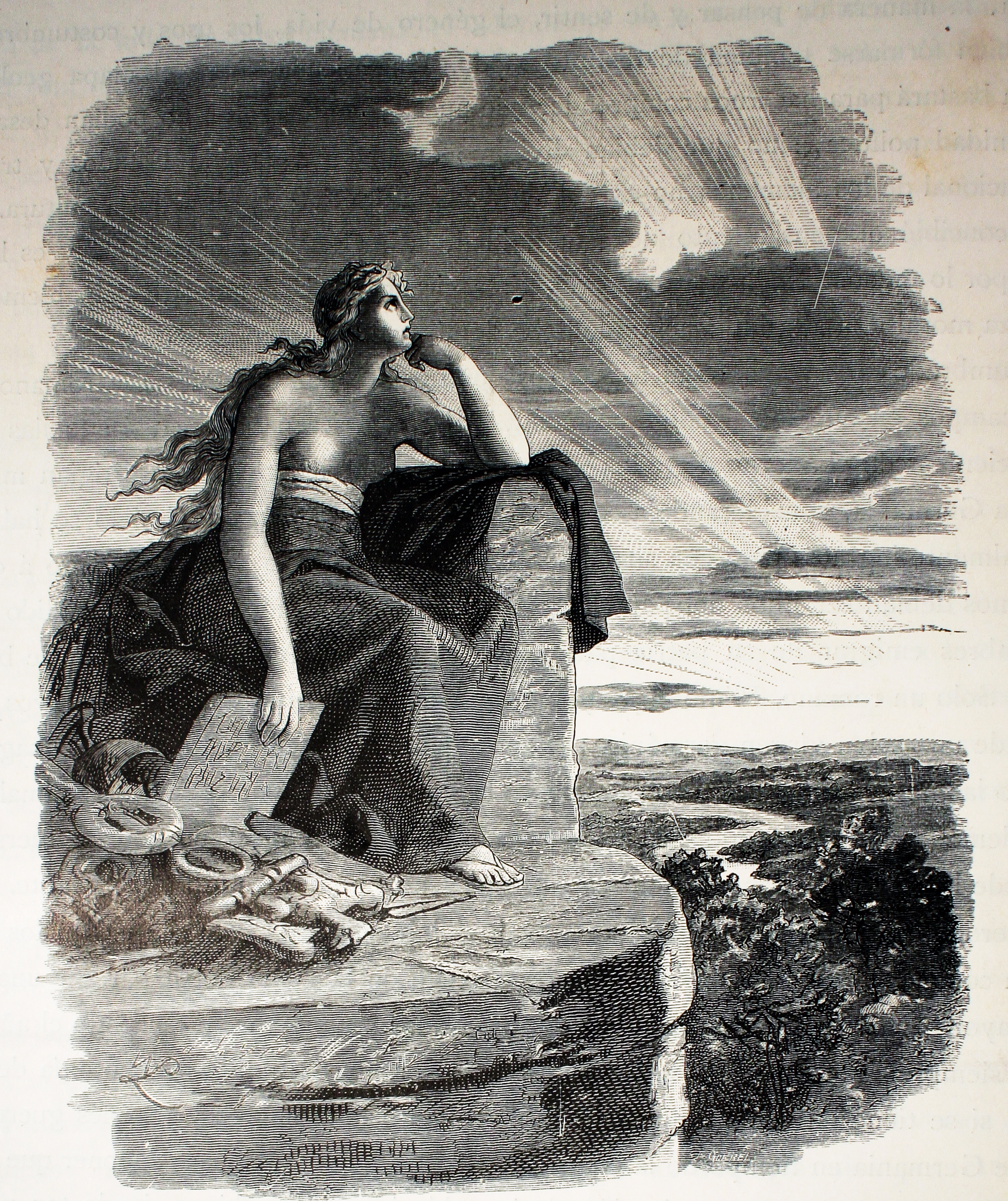
"Veleda, prophetess of the Germans," by Juan Scherr (1882)

Veleda (fl. AD 69–84) was a seeress of the Bructeri, a Germanic people who achieved some prominence during the Batavian rebellion of AD 69–70, headed by the Romanized Batavian chieftain Gaius Julius Civilis, when she correctly predicted the initial successes of the rebels against Roman legions.

== Name ==
The name Veleda (pronounced [wɛ.ɫɛ.da]) is most likely a borrowing from an unattested Gaulish noun *ueletā, meaning 'seeress' (cf. Gaulish uelets, Old Irish filed, Middle Welsh gwelet, 'seer'), with regular Germanic sound correspondence -t- > -d-. It may thus not represent a proper personal name, but rather a title originally designating the female officiant (i.e. the priestess) of a cult.

The medial vowel -e- is of uncertain quantity. While Statius scans it as short, the spelling -ae- in Tacitus and -η- in Cassius Dio, together with epigraphic attestations, appear to indicate a long vowel, and the form should probably be read as Velēda.

== Life ==
The ancient Germanic peoples discerned a divinity of prophecy in women and regarded prophetesses as true and living goddesses. In the latter half of the 1st century AD Veleda was regarded as a deity by most of the tribes in central Germany and enjoyed wide influence. She lived in a tower near the Lippe River, a tributary of the Rhine. The inhabitants of the Roman settlement of Colonia Claudia Ara Agrippinensium (now Cologne) accepted her arbitration in a conflict with the Tencteri, an unfederated tribe of Germany (i.e., one outside the boundary of the Roman Empire). In her role as arbitrator, the envoys were not admitted to her presence; an interpreter conveyed their messages to her and reported her pronouncements.

=== Batavian Uprising ===
The Batavian leader Civilis originally raised his force as an ally of Vespasian during the Roman power struggle in AD 69, but when he saw the weakened condition of the legions in Romanized Germany he openly revolted. It is not clear whether Veleda merely prophesied the rebellion or actively incited it; given the Germans' adoration of her as a goddess, remote in her tower, the distinction may not have been clear at the time. Early in AD 70 the revolt was joined by Julius Classicus and Julius Tutor, leaders of the Treviri who like Civilis were Roman citizens. The Roman garrison at Novaesium (now Neuss) surrendered without a fight, as did the one at Castra Vetera (near modern Xanten in Niederrhein, Germany). The commander of the Roman garrison, Munius Lupercus, was sent to Veleda, though he was killed en route, evidently in an ambush. Later, when the praetorian trireme was captured, it was rowed upriver on the Lippe as a gift to Veleda.

A strong show of force by nine Roman legions under Gaius Licinius Mucianus caused the rebellion to collapse. Civilis was cornered on his home island of Batavia on the lower Rhine by a force commanded by Quintus Petillius Cerialis; his fate is unknown, but in general Cerialis treated the rebels with surprising lenience, so as to reconcile them to Roman rule and military service. In Veleda's case, she was left at liberty for several years.

In AD 77 the Romans either captured her, perhaps as a hostage, or offered her asylum. According to Statius, her captor was then-Governor of Germania Inferior Rutilius Gallicus. A Greek epigram has been found at Ardea, a few kilometres south of Rome, that satirizes her prophetic powers. Veleda may have acted in the interest of Rome by negotiating the acceptance of a pro-Roman king by the Bructeri in AD 83 or 84. She was evidently long since deceased by the time Tacitus wrote his Germania in AD 98.

== Legacy ==
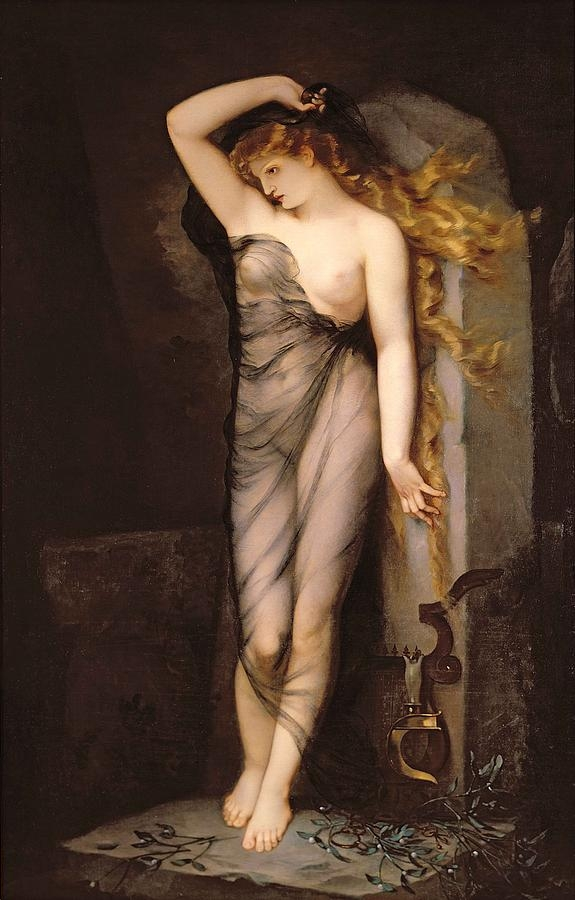
Velleda, as imagined in a 19th-century painting by Charles Voillemot.

In her 1795 novel Velleda, ein Zauberroman (Velleda, a Magic Novel), Benedikte Naubert conflated the lives of two contemporaries, Boudica and Veleda, whom she romanticized as Boadicea and Velleda. In Naubert's work, Velleda is portrayed as a sorceress who offers Boadicea's daughters access to immortality in the magical world of Germanic goddesses, while Boadicea draws her daughters back to the real world. A large extract from Naubert's novel appeared in Shawn C. Jarvis and Jeannine Blackwell's The Queen's Mirror, as did Amalie von Helwig's 1814 story "Die Symbole" (The Symbols), in which she was called Welleda. The forms "Velleda" and "Welleda" appear to be attempts to render the name in modern German (much as Richard Wagner rendered Odin or Wōden as Wotan in his Ring cycle).

Other 19th-century works incorporating Veleda/Velleda/Welleda included Friedrich de la Motte-Fouqué's 1818 novel, Welleda und Gemma; Eduard Sobolewski's 1835 opera Velleda; E.H. Maindron's 1843–44 marble sculpture Velleda; Franz Sigret's drawing Veleda, Prophetess of the Bructeri, and Paul Dukas' cantata Velléda.

More recently, Veleda's story was fictionalized by Poul Anderson in Star of the Sea (1991), and by Lindsey Davis in The Iron Hand of Mars (1992) and Saturnalia (2007). Veleda is also referenced as a prophetess turned saint/goddess in The Veil of Years (2001) by L. Warren Douglas. She is also a character in The Dragon Lord (1979), by David Drake.

On November 5, 1872, Paul Henry of Paris discovered an asteroid which was named 126 Velleda in honor of Veleda.

The book series Memory, Sorrow, and Thorn by Tad Williams features a mysterious and powerful seeress named Valada Geloë, likely inspired by Veleda.

== See also ==
- Germanic paganism
- Weleda
