= 148 Gallia =

Main-belt asteroid

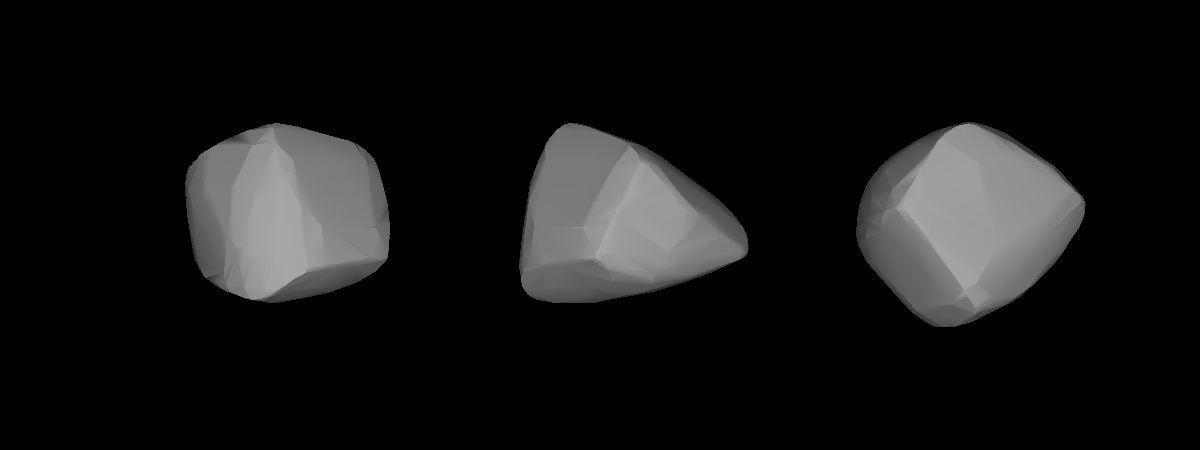
- Lightcurve-based 3D model of 148 Gallia

Discovery
- Discovered by: P. M. Henry
- Discovery site: Paris
- Discovery date: 7 August 1875

Designations
- Pronunciation: /ˈɡæliə/
- Named after: Gaul (Latin name for France)
- Alternative designations: A875 PA
- Minor planet category: main-belt · (middle); Gallia

Orbital characteristics
- Epoch 23 March 2018 (JD 2458200.5)
- Uncertainty parameter 0
- Observation arc: 138.37 yr (50,540 d)
- Aphelion: 3.2885 AU
- Perihelion: 2.2531 AU
- Semi-major axis: 2.7708 AU
- Eccentricity: 0.1868
- Orbital period (sidereal): 4.61 yr (1,685 d)
- Mean anomaly: 278.58°
- Mean motion: 0° 12^{m} 49.32^{s} / day
- Inclination: 25.291°
- Longitude of ascending node: 145.01°
- Argument of perihelion: 252.79°

Physical characteristics
- Mean diameter: 83.45±5.07 km (composite estimate); 98.09 km (derived) Individual estimates: 80.87±1.04 km; 85.91±23.39 km; 97.75±3.7 km
- Mass: (1.0±1.0)×10^{18} kg (Note: Calculated from its standard gravitational parameter GM = 0.07±0.07 km^{3}/s^{2}.) (SB441)
- Mean density: 2.1–3.8 g/cm^{3} (calculated)
- Synodic rotation period: 20.6592±0.0007 h 20.66±0.01 h 20.664 h 20.665266 h (Note: Warner (2011) web: modeled lightcurve gave a rotation period 20.665266 hours. Summary figures for (148) Gallia at the LCDB); 20.666±0.002 h (Note: Lightcurve plot of 148 Gallia, Palmer Divide Observatory, B. D. Warner (2007): rotation period 20.666±0.002 hours with a brightness amplitude of 0.21±0.02 mag. Quality code of 2+. Summary figures at the LCDB)
- Geometric albedo: 0.1640±0.013; 0.2013 (derived); 0.21±0.12; 0.240±0.008
- Spectral type: Tholen = GU; SMASS = S B–V = 0.858; U–B = 0.423
- Absolute magnitude (H): 6.97±0.84; 7.4; 7.4±0.1; 7.63; 7.67; 7.72±0.10

148 Gallia is an asteroid from the central regions of the asteroid belt, approximately 90 kilometers (56 miles) in diameter. It was discovered on 7 August 1875, by the French brothers Paul Henry and Prosper Henry at the Paris, but the credit for this discovery was given to Prosper. It was named after the Latin name for the country of France, Gaul. Based upon its spectrum, it is an unusual G-type asteroid (GU) and a stony S-type asteroid in the Tholen and SMASS classification, respectively.

Photometric observations of this asteroid at the European Southern Observatory in 1977–78 gave a light curve with a period of 0.86098 ± 0.00030 days (20.6635 ± 0.0072 h) and a brightness variation of 0.32 in magnitude. A 2007 study at the Palmer Divide Observatory in Colorado, United States, yielded a period of 20.666 ± 0.002 hours with a magnitude variation of 0.21.

This object is the namesake of the Gallia family (802), a small family of nearly 200 known stony asteroids that share similar spectral properties and orbital elements. Hence they may have arisen from the same collisional event. All members have a relatively high orbital inclination.
