= 159 Aemilia =

Main-belt asteroid

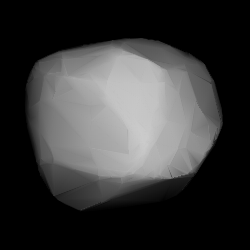
- 3D convex shape model of 159 Aemilia

Discovery
- Discovered by: P. P. Henry
- Discovery date: 26 January 1876

Designations
- Pronunciation: /ɪˈmɪliə/
- Named after: Via Aemilia
- Alternative designations: A876 BA; 1959 EG_{1}
- Minor planet category: Main belt (Hygiea family)
- Adjectives: Aemilian /ɪˈmɪliən/

Orbital characteristics
- Epoch 31 July 2016 (JD 2457600.5)
- Uncertainty parameter 0
- Observation arc: 112.24 yr (40996 d)
- Aphelion: 3.4377 AU (514.27 Gm)
- Perihelion: 2.76896 AU (414.231 Gm)
- Semi-major axis: 3.1033 AU (464.25 Gm)
- Eccentricity: 0.10775
- Orbital period (sidereal): 5.47 yr (1996.8 d)
- Average orbital speed: 16.86 km/s
- Mean anomaly: 214.036°
- Mean motion: 0° 10^{m} 49.008^{s} / day
- Inclination: 6.1308°
- Longitude of ascending node: 134.132°
- Argument of perihelion: 333.387°
- Earth MOID: 1.78581 AU (267.153 Gm)
- Jupiter MOID: 1.67782 AU (250.998 Gm)
- T_{Jupiter}: 3.203

Physical characteristics
- Mean diameter: 135/138 ± 7 km (LCI + occ); 137±8 km (thermophysical)
- Mass: (1.80±0.33)×10^{18} kg (Note: Calculated from its standard gravitational parameter GM = 0.120±0.022 km^{3}/s^{2}.)
- Mean density: 1.31–1.40 g/cm^{3} (calculated)
- Equatorial surface gravity: ~0.024 m/s^{2}
- Equatorial escape velocity: ~0.055 km/s
- Synodic rotation period: 24.486±0.002 h
- Pole ecliptic longitude: 139° ± 7° or 349° ± 7°
- Pole ecliptic latitude: 66° ± 5° or 63° ± 6°
- Geometric albedo: 0.054 ± 0.015; 0.064±0.014; 0.0627 ± 0.0142
- Temperature: ~160 K max: 239 K (−34 °C; −29 °F)
- Spectral type: C (Tholen)
- Absolute magnitude (H): 8.27, 8.10

159 Aemilia is a large main-belt asteroid. Aemilia was discovered by the French brothers Paul Henry and Prosper Henry on January 26, 1876. The credit for this discovery was given to Paul. It is probably named after the Via Aemilia, a Roman road in Italy that runs from Piacenza to Rimini.

This slowly rotating, dark asteroid has a primitive carbonaceous composition, based upon its classification as a C-type asteroid. Photometric observations made in 2006 gave a rotation period of about 25 hours. Subsequent observations made at the Oakley Observatory in Terre Haute, Indiana found a light curve period of 16.37 ± 0.02 hours, with variation in brightness of 0.24 ± 0.04 in magnitude.

It orbits within the Hygiea family, although it may be an unrelated interloping asteroid, as it is too big to have arisen from the cratering process that most probably produced that family. Three stellar occultations by Aemilia have been recorded so far, the first in 2001, the second in 2003 and the third in 2016
