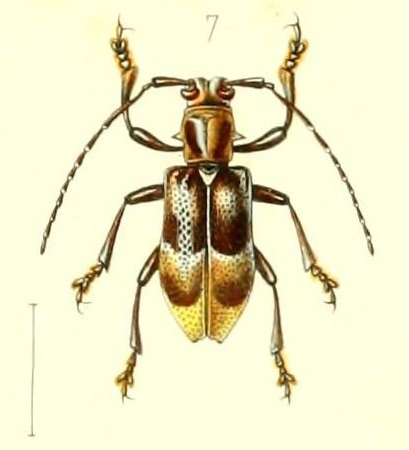

Scientific classification
- Kingdom: Animalia
- Phylum: Arthropoda
- Class: Insecta
- Order: Coleoptera
- Suborder: Polyphaga
- Infraorder: Cucujiformia
- Family: Cerambycidae
- Genus: Velleda
- Species: V. murina

Binomial name
- Velleda murina Thomson, 1858

= Velleda murina =

Species of beetle

Velleda murina is a species of beetle in the family Cerambycidae. It was described by James Thomson in 1858. It is known from the Republic of the Congo, Equatorial Guinea, and Gabon.
