= André Patry =

French astronomer (1902–1960)

Minor planets discovered: 9
| 1509 Esclangona | December 21, 1938 | MPC |
| 1510 Charlois | February 22, 1939 | MPC |
| 1515 Perrotin | November 15, 1936 | MPC |
| 1516 Henry | January 28, 1938 | MPC |
| 1539 Borrelly | October 29, 1940 | MPC |
| 1756 Giacobini | December 24, 1937 | MPC |
| 1797 Schaumasse | November 15, 1936 | MPC |
| 3142 Kilopi | January 9, 1937 | MPC |
| 4162 SAF | November 24, 1940 | MPC |

André Patry (22 November 1902 – 20 June 1960) was a French astronomer and discoverer of 9 minor planets in the late 1930s.

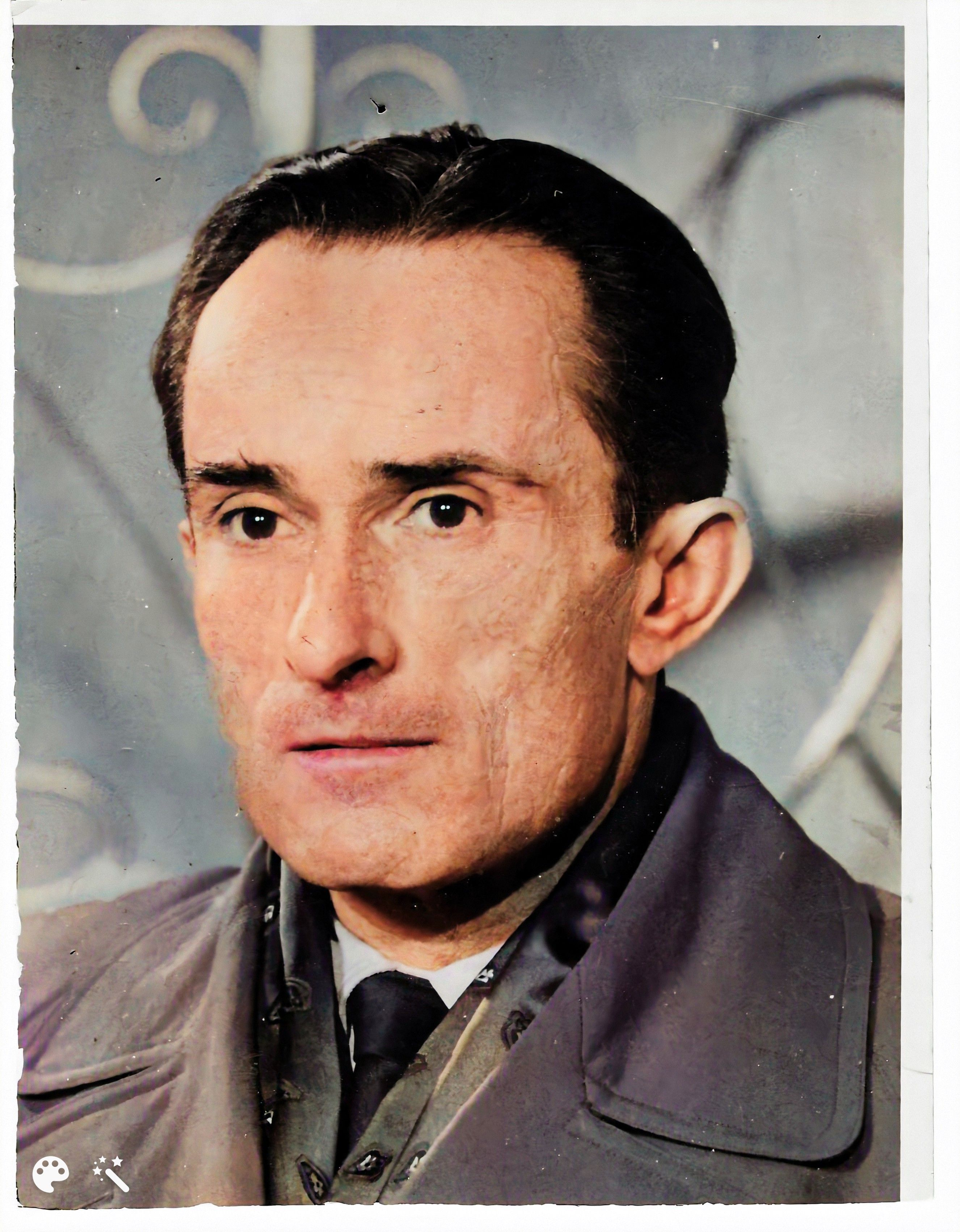
Andrés Patry

Patry was orphaned at a young age, and began working as a 17-year-old at the Nice Observatory in southeastern France. He studied asteroids and discovered several himself. The inner main-belt asteroid 1601 Patry was named in his honor (M.P.C. 2196).
