= 1510 Charlois =

Main-belt asteroid

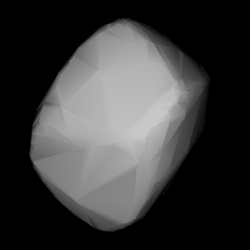
- Shape model of Charlois from its lightcurve

Discovery
- Discovered by: A. Patry
- Discovery site: Nice Obs.
- Discovery date: 22 February 1939

Designations
- Named after: Auguste Charlois (astronomer)
- Alternative designations: 1939 DC · 1959 WE; 1963 UB
- Minor planet category: main-belt · Eunomia

Orbital characteristics
- Epoch 4 September 2017 (JD 2458000.5)
- Uncertainty parameter 0
- Observation arc: 78.10 yr (28,525 days)
- Aphelion: 3.0649 AU
- Perihelion: 2.2791 AU
- Semi-major axis: 2.6720 AU
- Eccentricity: 0.1470
- Orbital period (sidereal): 4.37 yr (1,595 days)
- Mean anomaly: 16.619°
- Mean motion: 0° 13^{m} 32.52^{s} / day
- Inclination: 11.821°
- Longitude of ascending node: 331.49°
- Argument of perihelion: 165.25°

Physical characteristics
- Dimensions: 20.30±0.39 km 23.68 km (derived); 23.80±2.8 km (IRAS:11); 24.507±0.345; 26.98±0.64 km 27.608±0.373 km
- Synodic rotation period: 5.866±0.0003 h 6.653±0.008 h
- Geometric albedo: 0.0769±0.0086; 0.0791 (derived); 0.081±0.004; 0.1033±0.029 (IRAS:11); 0.118±0.017
- Spectral type: SMASS = C · C
- Absolute magnitude (H): 11.2 · 11.40 · 11.5

1510 Charlois (provisional designation 1939 DC) is a carbonaceous Eunomia asteroid from the middle region of the asteroid belt, approximately 24 kilometers in diameter.

It was discovered on 22 February 1939, by French astronomer André Patry at Nice Observatory in southeastern France, and later named after astronomer Auguste Charlois.

== Orbit and classification ==
Charlois is a carbonaceous C-type asteroid and a member of the Eunomia family, a large group of otherwise mostly S-type asteroids and the most prominent family in the intermediate main-belt. It orbits the Sun in the central main-belt at a distance of 2.3–3.1 AU once every 4 years and 4 months (1,595 days). Its orbit has an eccentricity of 0.15 and an inclination of 12° with respect to the ecliptic. As no precoveries were taken and no prior identifications were made, the body's observation arc begins with its discovery observation in 1939.

== Physical characteristics ==
=== Diameter and albedo ===
According to the surveys carried out by the Infrared Astronomical Satellite IRAS, the Japanese Akari satellite, and NASA's Wide-field Infrared Survey Explorer with its subsequent NEOWISE mission, Charlois measures between 20.3 and 27.6 kilometers in diameter, and its surface has an albedo between 0.077 and 0.12, while the Collaborative Asteroid Lightcurve Link derives an albedo of 0.079 and a diameter of 23.7 kilometers based on an absolute magnitude of 11.5.

=== Rotation period ===
In November 2007, a rotational lightcurve, constructed from photometric observations by Crag Bennefeld at the Rick Observatory, gave a rotation period of 6.653±0.008 hours with a brightness variation of 0.23 in magnitude (U=2). Another lightcurve, obtained by French astronomers Pierre Antonini and René Roy in February 2013, gave a period of 5.866±0.0003 hours with an amplitude of 0.18 (U=2).

== Naming ==
This minor planet was named in memory of French astronomer Auguste Charlois (1864–1910), an early discoverer of minor planets at the Nice Observatory where this asteroid was discovered. He was a pioneer during the transition from visual to photographic discoveries in the late 19th century. Until his homicide in 1910, he had discovered 99 asteroids. The official naming citation was published by the Minor Planet Center on 30 June 1977 (M.P.C. 4190).
