= Paravelleda orientalis =

Scientific classification
- Kingdom: Animalia
- Phylum: Arthropoda
- Class: Insecta
- Order: Coleoptera
- Suborder: Polyphaga
- Infraorder: Cucujiformia
- Family: Cerambycidae
- Genus: Paravelleda
- Species: P. orientalis

Binomial name
- Paravelleda orientalis Breuning, 1956

Species of beetle

Paravelleda orientalis is a species of beetle in the family Cerambycidae. It was described by Stephan von Breuning in 1956.
