= Velleda callizona =

Scientific classification
- Kingdom: Animalia
- Phylum: Arthropoda
- Class: Insecta
- Order: Coleoptera
- Suborder: Polyphaga
- Infraorder: Cucujiformia
- Family: Cerambycidae
- Genus: Velleda
- Species: V. callizona

Binomial name
- Velleda callizona (Chevrolat, 1855)

Synonyms
- Parmena callizona Chevrolat, 1855

Species of beetle

Velleda callizona is a species of beetle in the family Cerambycidae. It was described by Louis Alexandre Auguste Chevrolat in 1855. It is known from Nigeria.
