= Falsovelleda =

Scientific classification
- Domain: Eukaryota
- Kingdom: Animalia
- Phylum: Arthropoda
- Class: Insecta
- Order: Coleoptera
- Suborder: Polyphaga
- Infraorder: Cucujiformia
- Family: Cerambycidae
- Tribe: Acanthocinini
- Genus: Falsovelleda

Genus of beetles

Falsovelleda is a genus of beetles in the family Cerambycidae, containing the following species:

- Falsovelleda congolensis (Hintz, 1911)
- Falsovelleda rufescens (Breuning, 1970)
- Falsovelleda similis Breuning, 1970
