= 177 Irma =

Main-belt asteroid

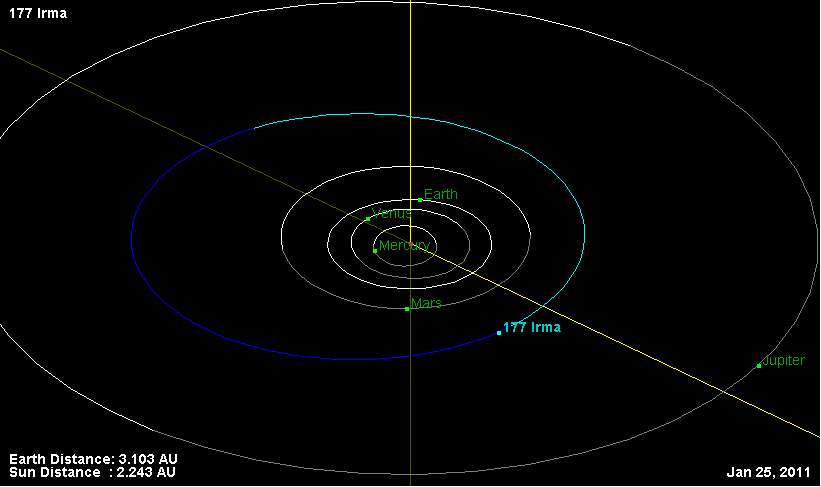
- Orbital diagram

Discovery
- Discovered by: P. P. Henry, 1877
- Discovery date: 5 November 1877

Designations
- Alternative designations: A877 VA; 1900 UB; 1900 VA;1912 HE; 1937 UA, 1962 DB
- Minor planet category: Main belt

Orbital characteristics
- Epoch 31 July 2016 (JD 2457600.5)
- Uncertainty parameter 0
- Observation arc: 115.30 yr (42113 d)
- Aphelion: 3.4260 AU (512.52 Gm)
- Perihelion: 2.1110 AU (315.80 Gm)
- Semi-major axis: 2.7685 AU (414.16 Gm)
- Eccentricity: 0.23749
- Orbital period (sidereal): 4.61 yr (1682.5 d)
- Mean anomaly: 42.096°
- Mean motion: 0° 12^{m} 50.256^{s} / day
- Inclination: 1.3893°
- Longitude of ascending node: 347.55°
- Argument of perihelion: 38.184°
- Earth MOID: 1.11401 AU (166.654 Gm)
- Jupiter MOID: 2.03001 AU (303.685 Gm)
- T_{Jupiter}: 3.296

Physical characteristics
- Mean radius: 36.61±0.8 km
- Synodic rotation period: 13.856 h (0.5773 d)
- Geometric albedo: 0.0527±0.002
- Spectral type: C
- Absolute magnitude (H): 9.49

177 Irma is a fairly large and dark main belt asteroid. It was discovered by the French brothers Paul Henry and Prosper Henry on November 5, 1877. Paul was credited for this discovery. The meaning of the name Irma is unknown.

Photometric observations of this asteroid at the Organ Mesa Observatory in Las Cruces, New Mexico in 2011 gave a light curve with a period of 13.856 ± 0.001 hours and a brightness variation of 0.30 ± 0.03 in magnitude.
