= Naktong Vallis =

Vallis on Mars

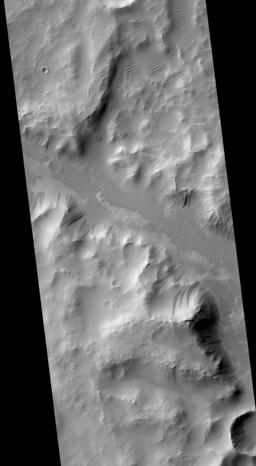
- Naktong Vallis as seen by HiRISE
- Coordinates: 5.3°N 327.1°W
- Length: 670 kilometres (416 mi)
- Naming: River in Korea

Naktong Vallis is an ancient river valley in the Arabia quadrangle of Mars, located at 5.3 degrees north latitude and 327.1 degrees west longitude. It is 670 km long and was named after the Nakdong River in Korea.

Naktong Vallis is part of the Naktong/Scamander/Mamers Valles lake-chain system that is comparable in length of Earth's largest system, like the Missouri-Mississippi.
