= 227 Philosophia =

Main-belt asteroid

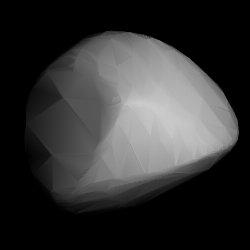
- 3D model based on lightcurve data

Discovery
- Discovered by: P.P. Henry
- Discovery date: 12 August 1882

Designations
- Pronunciation: /fɪloʊˈsɒfiə/
- Named after: Philosophy
- Alternative designations: A882 PA, 1919 AA; 1933 SD_{1}, 1949 OO_{1}
- Minor planet category: Main belt

Orbital characteristics
- Epoch 31 July 2016 (JD 2457600.5)
- Uncertainty parameter 0
- Observation arc: 108.20 yr (39519 d)
- Aphelion: 3.7673 AU (563.58 Gm)
- Perihelion: 2.56007 AU (382.981 Gm)
- Semi-major axis: 3.16366 AU (473.277 Gm)
- Eccentricity: 0.19079
- Orbital period (sidereal): 5.63 yr (2055.3 d)
- Average orbital speed: 16.78 km/s
- Mean anomaly: 71.2570°
- Mean motion: 0° 10^{m} 30.554^{s} / day
- Inclination: 9.1539°
- Longitude of ascending node: 326.254°
- Argument of perihelion: 267.020°

Physical characteristics
- Mean diameter: 101 ± 5 km
- Mass: (7.9±3.6)×10^{17} kg (Note: Calculated from its standard gravitational parameter GM = 0.053±0.024 km^{3}/s^{2}.)
- Mean density: 1.47±0.70 g/cm^{3} (calculated)
- Synodic rotation period: 24.486±0.002 h
- Pole ecliptic longitude: 97° ± 5° or 271° ± 5°
- Pole ecliptic latitude: 16° ± 5° or 0° ± 5°
- Geometric albedo: 0.041±0.005
- Absolute magnitude (H): 9.1

227 Philosophia is a large main-belt asteroid that was discovered by the French astronomer Paul-Pierre Henry on August 12, 1882, in Paris and named after the topic of philosophy. Based upon photometric observations, it has a synodic rotation period of 52.98 ± 0.01 with a brightness variation of 0.15 ± 0.02 in magnitude.
