= 186 Celuta =

50 km Main belt asteroid

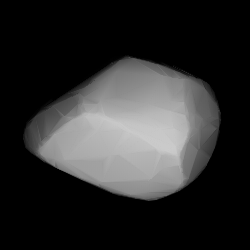
- 3D convex shape model of 186 Celuta

Discovery
- Discovered by: P. M. Henry, 1878
- Discovery date: 6 April 1878

Designations
- Pronunciation: /sɛˈluːtə/
- Alternative designations: A878 GA; 1954 FD
- Minor planet category: Main belt

Orbital characteristics
- Epoch 31 July 2016 (JD 2457600.5)
- Uncertainty parameter 0
- Observation arc: 132.36 yr (48343 d)
- Aphelion: 2.7152 AU (406.19 Gm)
- Perihelion: 2.0084 AU (300.45 Gm)
- Semi-major axis: 2.3618 AU (353.32 Gm)
- Eccentricity: 0.14964
- Orbital period (sidereal): 3.63 yr (1325.8 d)
- Mean anomaly: 275.22°
- Mean motion: 0° 16^{m} 17.544^{s} / day
- Inclination: 13.185°
- Longitude of ascending node: 14.769°
- Argument of perihelion: 315.65°
- Earth MOID: 1.01999 AU (152.588 Gm)
- Jupiter MOID: 2.71546 AU (406.227 Gm)
- T_{Jupiter}: 3.500

Physical characteristics
- Dimensions: 49.99±1.6 km
- Synodic rotation period: 19.842 h (0.8268 d)
- Geometric albedo: 0.1929±0.013
- Spectral type: SK
- Absolute magnitude (H): 8.91

186 Celuta is a main belt asteroid. It was discovered by the French astronomers Paul Henry and Prosper Henry on April 6, 1878. This was the last discovery credited to the Prosper brothers. The asteroid is named after Céluta, a female character in two works of fiction by François-René de Chateaubriand, Atala (1801) and René (1802). The Henry brothers had already named another of their discoveries, 152 Atala, after the heroine of Atala. Both Atala and Céluta are American Indian fictional characters.

This object is orbiting the Sun at a distance of 2.36 AU with an eccentricity of 0.15 and an orbital period of 3.63 years. The orbital plane is inclined at an angle of 13.2° relative to the plane of the ecliptic. 186 Celuta has a diameter of 50 km and it is classified as a stony S-type asteroid.

Photometric observations of this asteroid at the Organ Mesa Observatory in Las Cruces, New Mexico during 2010 gave a light curve with a period of 19.842±0.001 hours and a brightness variation of 0.54±0.02 in magnitude.
