= Henry Frères (crater) =

Crater on the Moon

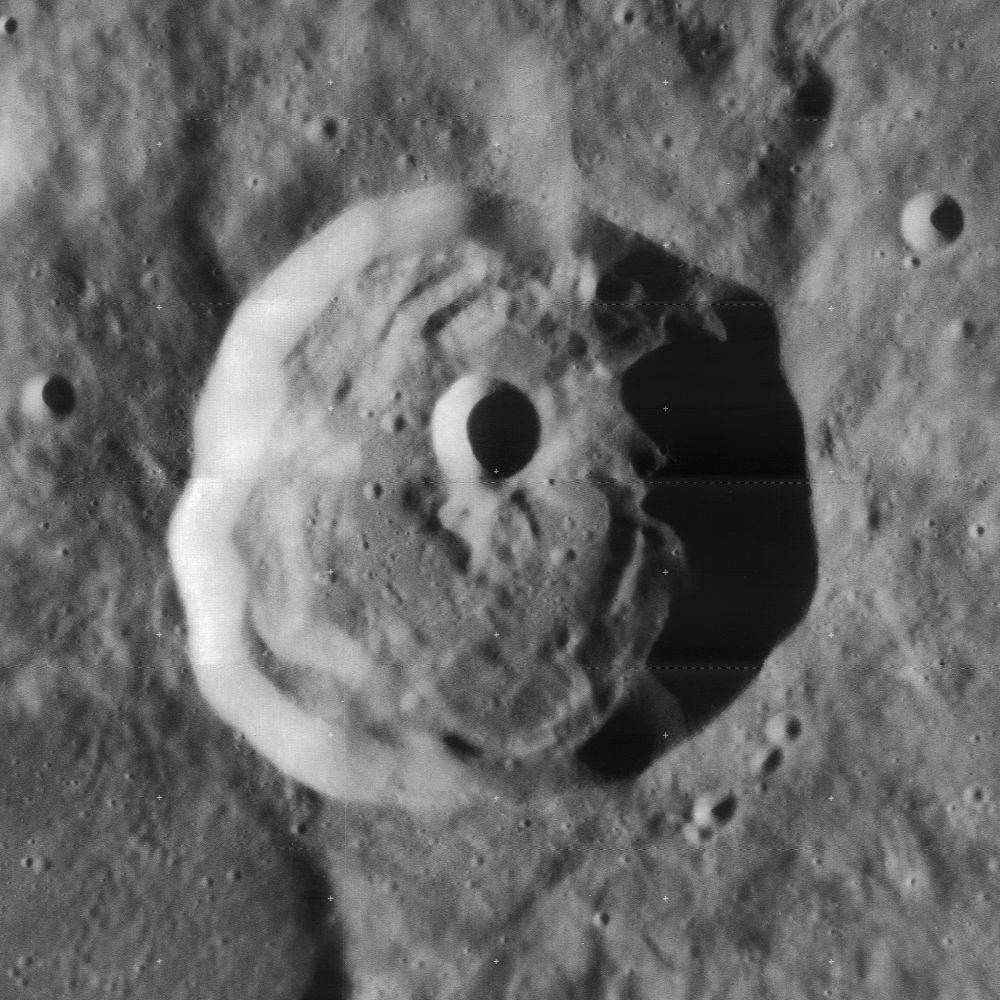
- Lunar Orbiter 4 image
- Coordinates: 23.5°S 58.9°W
- Diameter: 42 km
- Depth: 2.0 km
- Colongitude: 59° at sunrise
- Eponym: Paul Henry and Prosper Henry

Henry Frères is a lunar impact crater that is located in the southwestern part of the near side of the Moon. It was named after the brothers Paul Henry and Prosper Henry, French astronomers. It lies just to the west-northwest of the crater Henry, a similar diameter feature. To the west-southwest of Henry Frères is the much larger crater Byrgius. Rays from the satellite crater Byrgius A lie across the floor of this formation, forming a wispy trace from west to east.

The outer rim of Henry Frères is nearly circular, with a slight outward bulge along the southwest. When viewed from the Earth, however, this crater has more of an oval shape due to foreshortening. There is some irregularity along the northeast, but the rim is otherwise not significantly eroded or overlain by craters of note. The western part of the interior floor has some uneven areas, and a small crater lies in the northern part of the floor.

== Satellite craters ==
By convention these features are identified on lunar maps by placing the letter on the side of the crater midpoint that is closest to Henry Frères.

Henry Frères	Latitude	Longitude	Diameter
C	24.6° S	59.7° W	37 km
E	24.6° S	60.0° W	4 km
G	22.8° S	58.0° W	4 km
H	22.3° S	56.6° W	6 km
R	21.5° S	57.8° W	7 km
S	20.5° S	56.4° W	6 km

== See also ==
- 1516 Henry, minor planet
- Henry (Martian crater)
