= 141 Lumen =

Main-belt asteroid

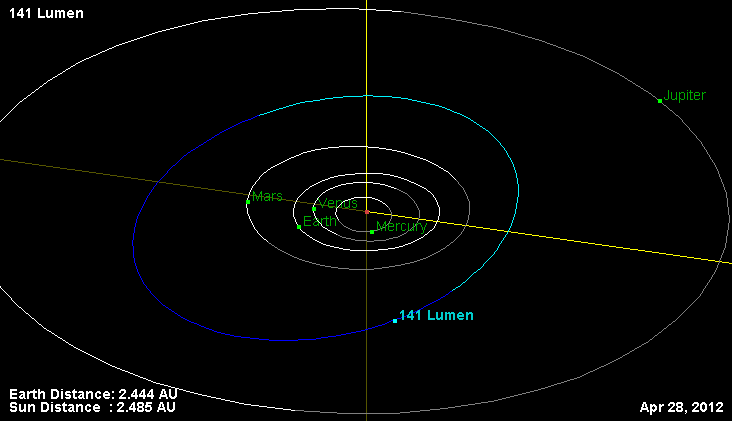
- Orbital diagram

Discovery
- Discovered by: P. P. Henry
- Discovery date: 13 January 1875

Designations
- Pronunciation: /ˈluːmən/, /ˈluːmɛn/
- Named after: Lumen: Récits de l'infini
- Minor planet category: main-belt · (middle); Eunomian interloper

Orbital characteristics
- Epoch 31 July 2016 (JD 2457600.5)
- Uncertainty parameter 0
- Observation arc: 138.63 yr (50635 d)
- Aphelion: 3.23723 AU (484.283 Gm)
- Perihelion: 2.09253 AU (313.038 Gm)
- Semi-major axis: 2.66488 AU (398.660 Gm)
- Eccentricity: 0.21477
- Orbital period (sidereal): 4.35 yr (1589.0 d)
- Mean anomaly: 292.477°
- Mean motion: 0° 13^{m} 35.623^{s} / day
- Inclination: 11.8967°
- Longitude of ascending node: 318.504°
- Argument of perihelion: 58.1076°

Physical characteristics
- Mean diameter: 132.24±1.73 km (composite estimate); 131.03±2.9 km 130 km
- Mass: (2.01±0.28)×10^{18} kg (Note: Calculated from its standard gravitational parameter GM = 0.134±0.019 km^{3}/s^{2}.)
- Mean density: 2.33 g/cm^{3} (Note: Assuming a diameter of 118 km.)
- Synodic rotation period: 19.87 h (0.828 d); 0.820 d (19.67 h)
- Geometric albedo: 0.0540±0.002; 0.054
- Spectral type: C
- Absolute magnitude (H): 8.4

141 Lumen is a carbonaceous asteroid from the intermediate asteroid belt, approximately 130 kilometers in diameter. It is an identified Eunomian interloper.

== Description ==
It was discovered on January 13, 1875, by the brothers Paul Henry and Prosper Henry, but Paul is the one who was given the credit for this discovery. It is named for Lumen: Récits de l'infini, a book by the astronomer Camille Flammarion.

Richard Binzel and Schelte Bus further added to the knowledge about this asteroid in a light-curve survey published in 2003. This project was known as Small Main-belt Asteroid Spectroscopic Survey, Phase II or SMASSII, which built on a previous survey of the main-belt asteroids. The visible-wavelength (0.435–0.925 micrometre) spectra data was gathered between August 1993 and March 1999.

Lightcurve data has also been recorded by observers at the Antelope Hill Observatory, which has been designated as an official observatory by the Minor Planet Center.
