= 126 Velleda =

Main-belt asteroid

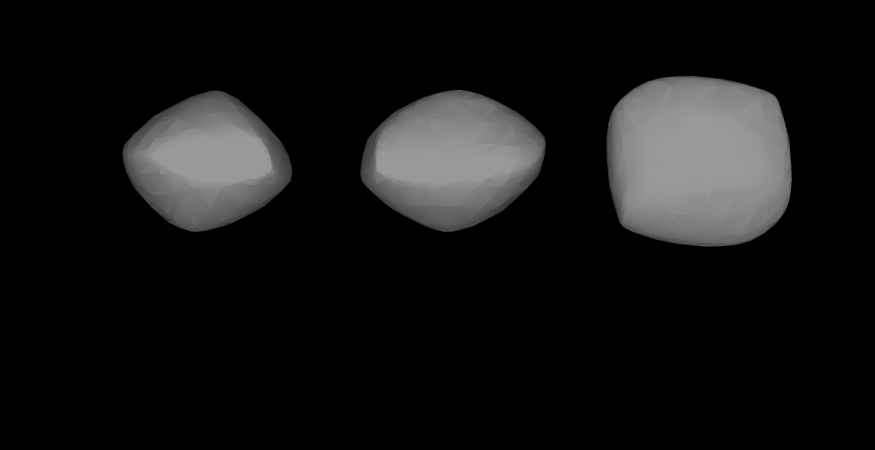
- A three-dimensional model of 126 Velleda based on its lightcurve

Discovery
- Discovered by: Paul Henry and Prosper Henry
- Discovery date: 5 November 1872

Designations
- Pronunciation: /ˈvɛlɪdə/
- Named after: Veleda
- Alternative designations: A872 VA; 1949 YF; 1950 BD_{1}
- Minor planet category: Main belt

Orbital characteristics
- Epoch 31 December 2006 (JD 2454100.5)
- Aphelion: 403.523 Gm (2.697 AU)
- Perihelion: 326.153 Gm (2.180 AU)
- Semi-major axis: 364.816 Gm (2.439 AU)
- Eccentricity: 0.1060806
- Orbital period (sidereal): 1,391.107 days (3.81 yr)
- Mean anomaly: 117.027°
- Inclination: 2.92451°
- Longitude of ascending node: 23.47325°
- Argument of perihelion: 327.94065°

Physical characteristics
- Mean diameter: 44.82±1.3 km
- Synodic rotation period: 5.364±0.003 h
- Geometric albedo: 0.1723
- Spectral type: S
- Absolute magnitude (H): 9.27

126 Velleda is a main-belt asteroid. It is probably a rather typical, albeit sizable, S-type asteroid. This asteroid was named for Veleda, a priestess and prophet of the Germanic tribe of the Bructeri. It was discovered by Paul Henry on 5 November 1872, in Paris, France. It was his first credited discovery. He and his brother Prosper Henry discovered a total of 14 asteroids.

This body is orbiting the Sun at a distance of 2.44 AU with a period of 3.81 years and an eccentricity (ovalness) of 0.11. The orbital plane is inclined by 2.9° to the plane of the ecliptic. It has a cross-section diameter of ~45 km. This asteroid has had multiple studies of its rotation period, yielding an adopted period of 5.3672 h. During each rotation the brightness varies by 0.22 magnitudes.
