= Falsovelleda congolensis =

Scientific classification
- Domain: Eukaryota
- Kingdom: Animalia
- Phylum: Arthropoda
- Class: Insecta
- Order: Coleoptera
- Suborder: Polyphaga
- Infraorder: Cucujiformia
- Family: Cerambycidae
- Genus: Falsovelleda
- Species: F. congolensis

Binomial name
- Falsovelleda congolensis (Hintz, 1911)

Species of beetle

Falsovelleda congolensis is a species of beetle in the family Cerambycidae. It was described by Hintz in 1911.
