= 125 Liberatrix =

Main-belt asteroid

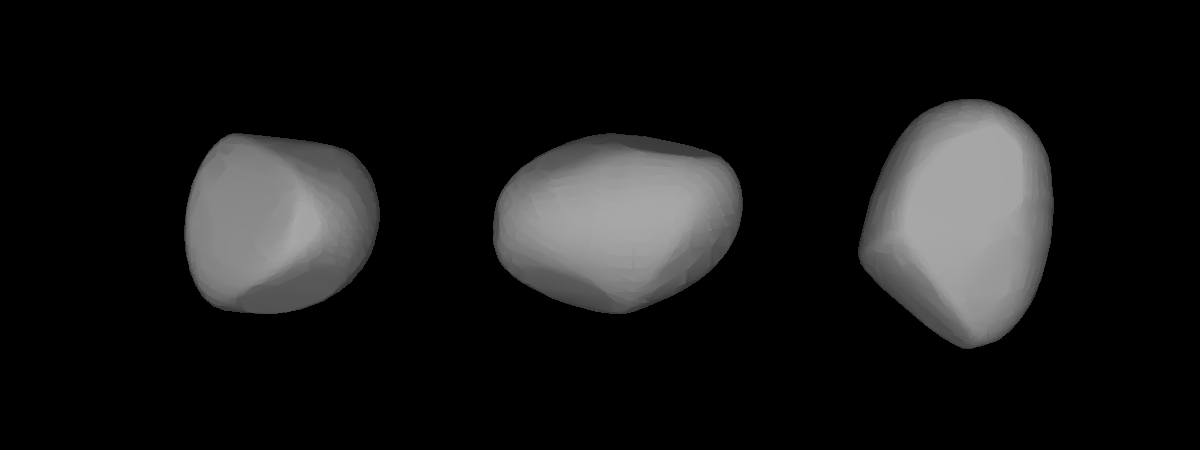
- A three-dimensional model of 125 Liberatrix based on its light curve.

Discovery
- Discovered by: Paul Henry and Prosper Henry
- Discovery date: 11 September 1872

Designations
- Pronunciation: /ˈlɪbəreɪtrɪks/
- Alternative designations: A872 RA; 1902 EG; 1943 FE; 1949 OE_{1}; 1949 SM; 1954 TD_{1}
- Minor planet category: Main belt (liberatrix)

Orbital characteristics
- Epoch 31 July 2016 (JD 2457600.5)
- Uncertainty parameter 0
- Observation arc: 143.54 yr (52428 d)
- Aphelion: 2.95698 AU (442.358 Gm)
- Perihelion: 2.53084 AU (378.608 Gm)
- Semi-major axis: 2.74391 AU (410.483 Gm)
- Eccentricity: 0.077651
- Orbital period (sidereal): 4.55 yr (1660.2 d)
- Average orbital speed: 17.96 km/s
- Mean anomaly: 307.971°
- Mean motion: 0° 13^{m} 0.642^{s} / day
- Inclination: 4.66407°
- Longitude of ascending node: 169.003°
- Argument of perihelion: 109.288°
- Earth MOID: 1.51912 AU (227.257 Gm)
- Jupiter MOID: 2.13019 AU (318.672 Gm)
- T_{Jupiter}: 3.340

Physical characteristics
- Dimensions: 43.58±2.3 km 61.058 km
- Mass: 8.7×10^{16} kg
- Mean density: 2.0 g/cm^{3}
- Equatorial surface gravity: 0.0122 m/s^{2}
- Equatorial escape velocity: 0.0231 km/s
- Synodic rotation period: 3.968 h (0.1653 d)
- Geometric albedo: 0.2253±0.026; 0.1305 ± 0.0269
- Temperature: ~168 K
- Spectral type: M (Tholen)
- Absolute magnitude (H): 9.04, 8.90

125 Liberatrix is a main-belt asteroid. It has a relatively reflective surface and an M-type spectrum. Liberatrix is a member of an asteroid family bearing its own name.

It was discovered by Prosper Henry on 11 September 1872, from Paris. Some sources give Paul Henry sole credit for its discovery. The asteroid's name is a feminine version of the word "liberator". Henry may have chosen the name to mark the liberation of France from Prussia during the Franco-Prussian War in 1870. More specifically, it may honor Adolphe Thiers, the first President of the French Republic, who arranged a loan that enabled the Prussian troops to be removed from France.

In the late 1990s, a network of astronomers worldwide gathered lightcurve data to derive the spin states and shape models of 10 asteroids, including Liberatrix. Liberatrix's lightcurve has a large amplitude of 0.4 in magnitude, indicating an elongated or irregular shape.

The spectrum of this asteroid matches a M-type asteroid. It may be the remnant of an asteroid that had undergone differentiation, with orthopyroxene minerals scattered evenly across the surface. There is no indication of hydration.

To date, there have been at least two observed occultations by Liberatrix. Early on 11 December 2014, Liberatrix occulted a 9th magnitude star and was visible over the majority of Southern California and a swath of Mexico.
