= Paravelleda aberrans =

Scientific classification
- Kingdom: Animalia
- Phylum: Arthropoda
- Class: Insecta
- Order: Coleoptera
- Suborder: Polyphaga
- Infraorder: Cucujiformia
- Family: Cerambycidae
- Genus: Paravelleda
- Species: P. aberrans

Binomial name
- Paravelleda aberrans (Duvivier, 1891)

Species of beetle

Paravelleda aberrans is a species of beetle in the family Cerambycidae. It was described by Duvivier in 1891.
