= Henry (Martian crater) =

Martian crater

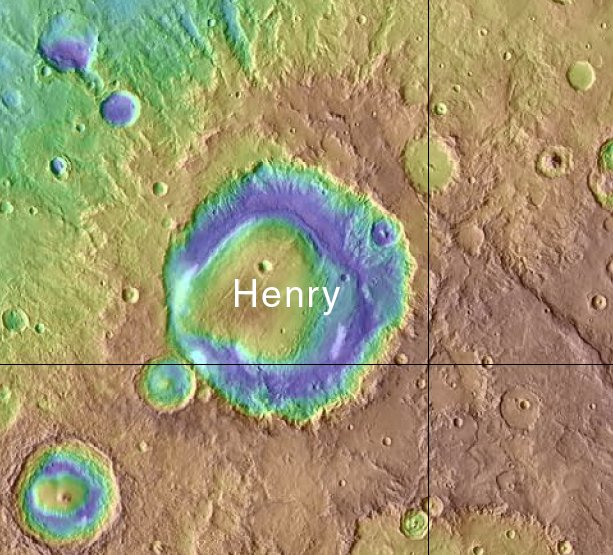
- Location of Henry crater
- Planet: Mars
- Region: Arabia quadrangle
- Coordinates: 10.9°N 23.3°E
- Quadrangle: Arabia
- Diameter: 171 km
- Eponym: Paul Henry and Prosper Henry

Henry is a large crater in the Arabia quadrangle of Mars. It is 171 kilometres (106 mi) in diameter and was named after the brothers Paul Henry and Prosper Henry, both of whom were French telescope makers and astronomers.

Arago crater is to the east of Henry, Barth crater is to the southeast, and Pasteur crater is to the north.

== Layers ==
Henry crater has a large mound in its center that shows layers in certain parts. The layers can be a few meters thick or tens of meters thick. Recent research on these layers by scientists at California Institute of Technology (Caltech) suggest that ancient climate change on Mars caused by regular variation in the planet's tilt, or obliquity may have caused the patterns in the layers. On Earth, similar changes (astronomical forcing) of climate results in ice-age cycles.

In a recent study of layers in craters in western Arabia Terra much was learned about the layers. Each layer may average under 4 meters in one crater, but 20 meters in another. Although the craters in this study are just outside the boundary for the Arabia quadrangle the findings would probably apply to the Arabia quadrangle as well. The pattern of layers within layers measured in Becquerel crater, suggests that each layer was formed over a period of about 100,000 years. Moreover, every 10 layers were bundled together into larger units. The 10-layer pattern is repeated at least 10 times. So every 10-layer pattern took one million years to form.

It is believed that the regular pattern of layers in Arabia Terra is connected to the regular way in which the rotational axis of Mars changes. The tilt of the Earth's axis changes by only a little more than 2 degrees. In contrast Mars's tilt varies by tens of degrees. When the tilt (or obliquity) is low, the poles are the coldest places on the planet, while the sun is located near the equator all the time. This could cause gases in the atmosphere, like water and carbon dioxide, to migrate poleward, where they'd be locked up as ice. When the obliquity is higher, the poles receive more sunlight, causing those materials to migrate away. When carbon dioxide moves from the poles, the atmospheric pressure increases, maybe causing a difference in the ability of winds to transport and deposit sand. Also, with more water in the atmosphere sand grains may stick and cement together to form layers. This study was done using stereo topographic maps obtained by processing data from the high-resolution camera onboard NASA's Mars Reconnaissance Orbiter.

Another group of researchers proposed groundwater with dissolved minerals came to the surface in craters, and helped to form layers by adding minerals (especially sulfate) and cementing sediments. This hypothesis is supported by a groundwater model and by sulfates discovered in a wide area. At first, by examining surface materials with Opportunity Rover, scientists discovered that groundwater had repeatedly risen and deposited sulfates. Later studies with instruments on board the Mars Reconnaissance Orbiter showed that the same kinds of materials exist in a large area that included Arabia. In this model, the layers in the mound of Henry would be caused partly by sediments moving into the crater and partly by minerals rising up with groundwater and being deposited.

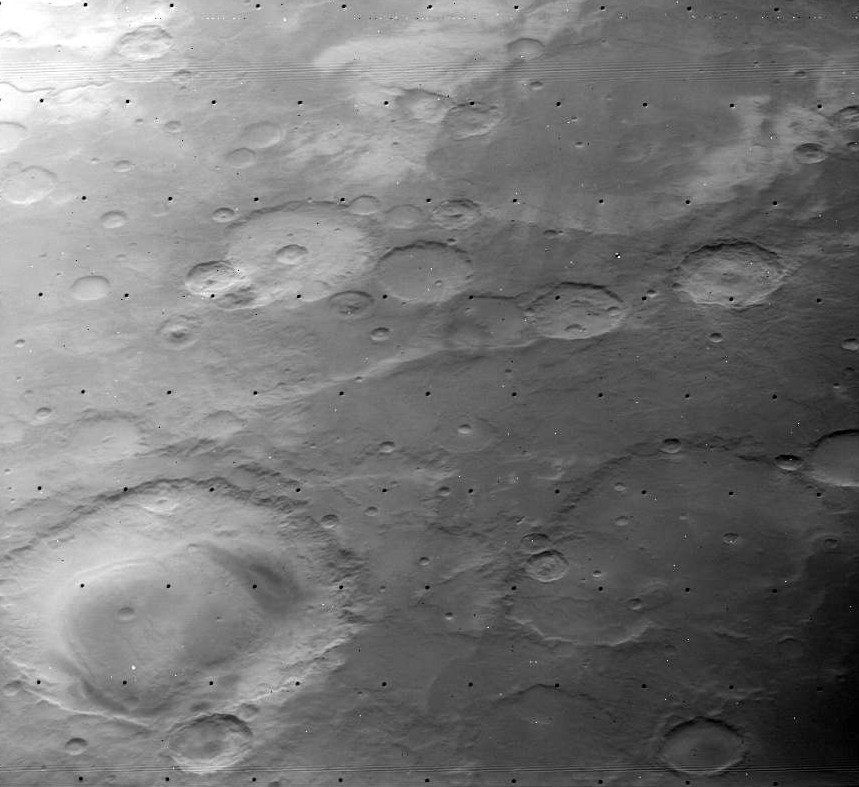
Oblique view from Viking Orbiter 1 of Henry crater (lower left), Barth crater (lower right), and Arago crater (upper right)

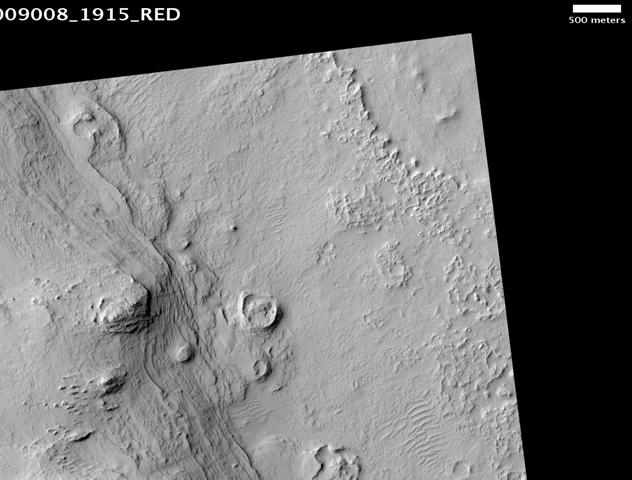
Henry crater mound, as seen by HiRISE

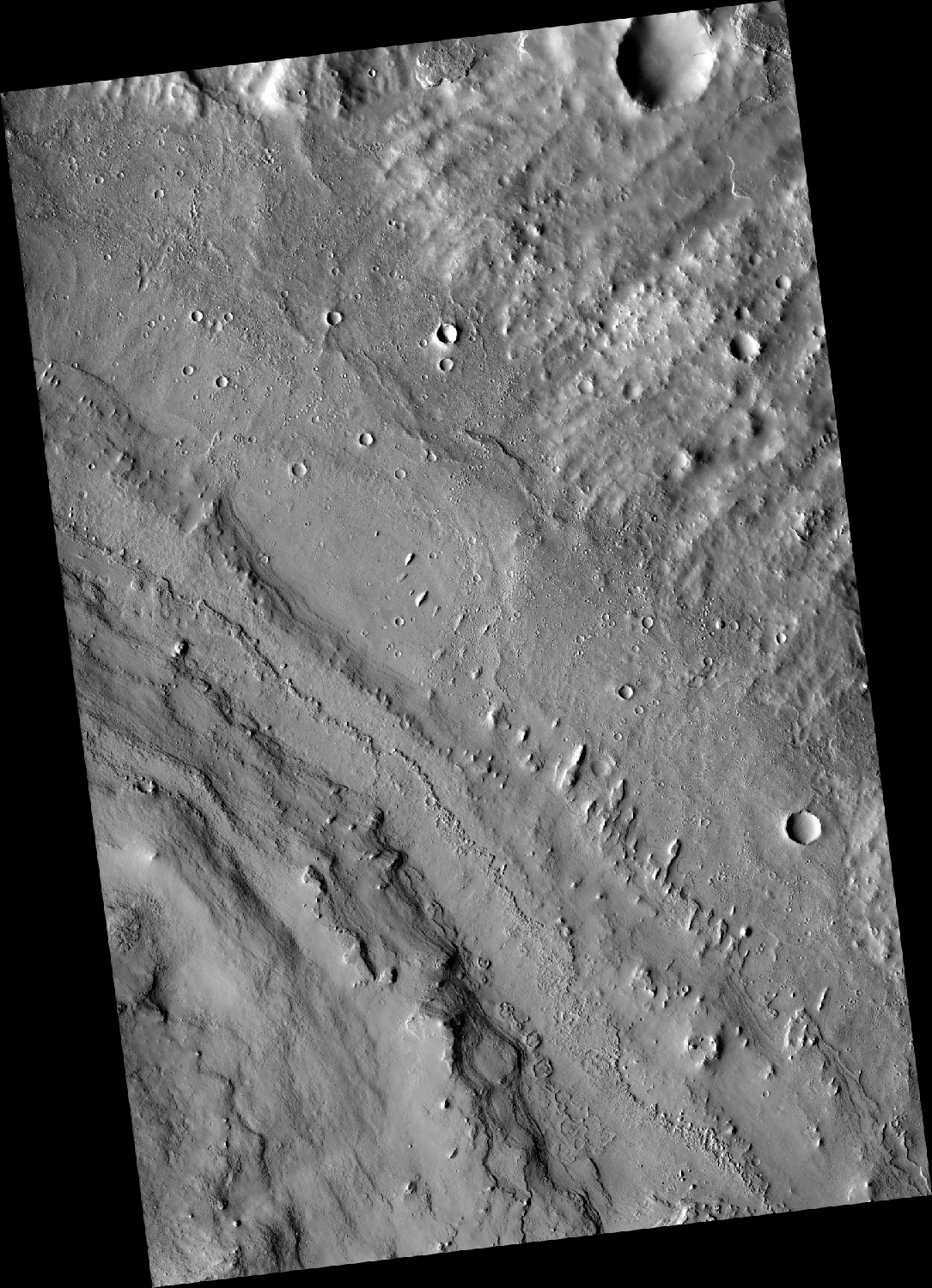
Northeastern Henry crater showning layers at lower left and linear hills called yardangs, sculpted by wind

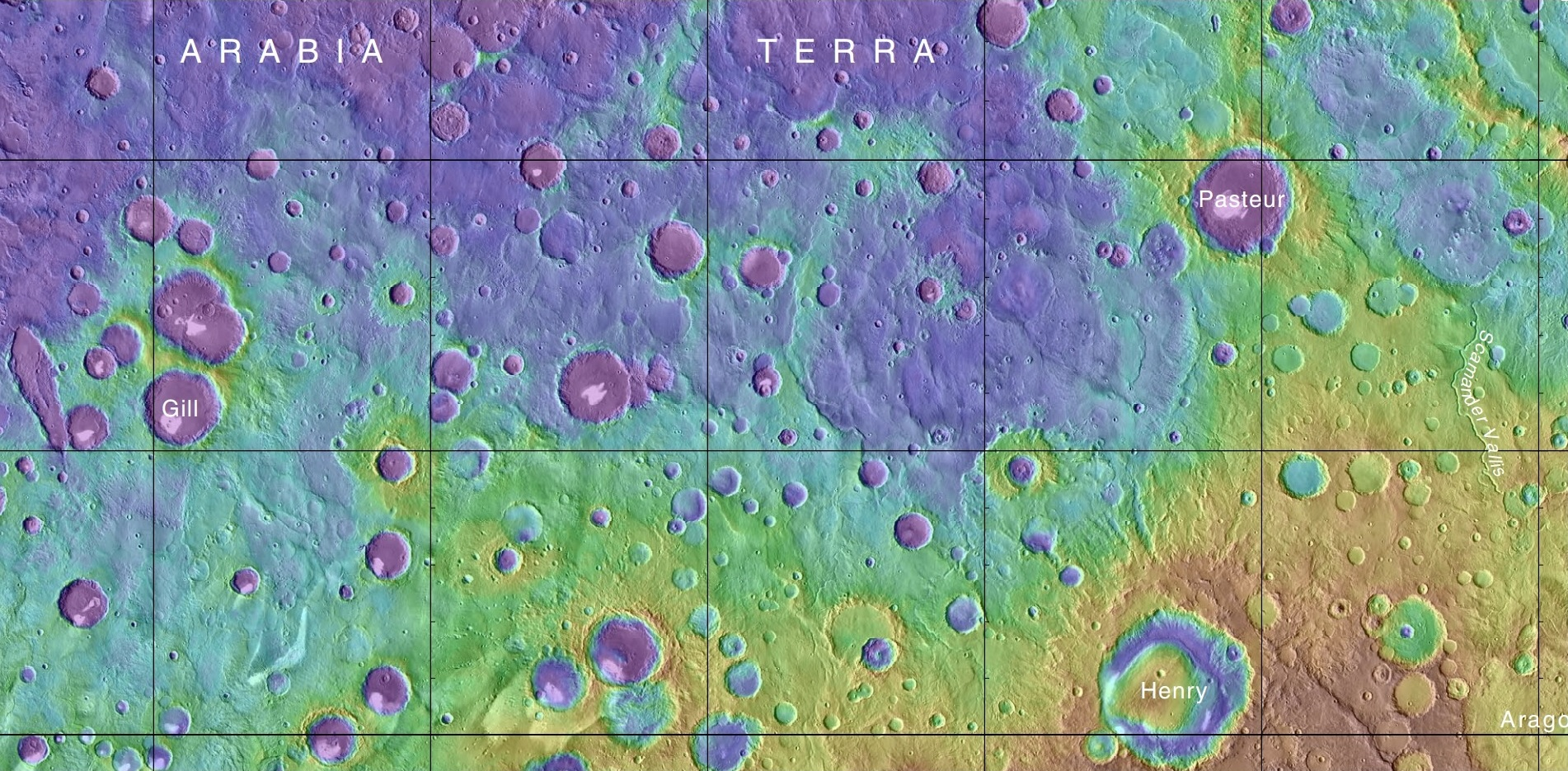
MOLA map, showing Henry crater and other nearby craters. Colors indicate elevations.

== See also ==
- List of craters on Mars
