= Mamers Valles =

Vallis on Mars

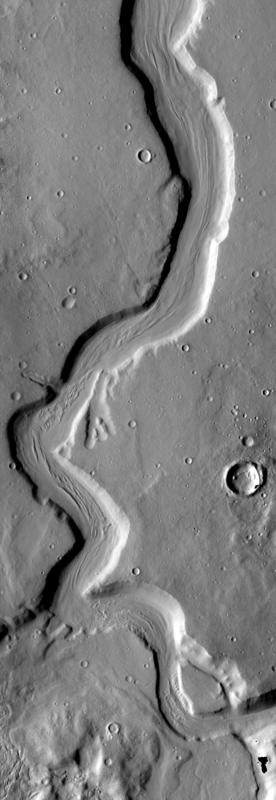
- Coordinates: 40.3°N 342.2°W
- Length: 1,020.0
- Naming: Word for "Mars" in Oscan.

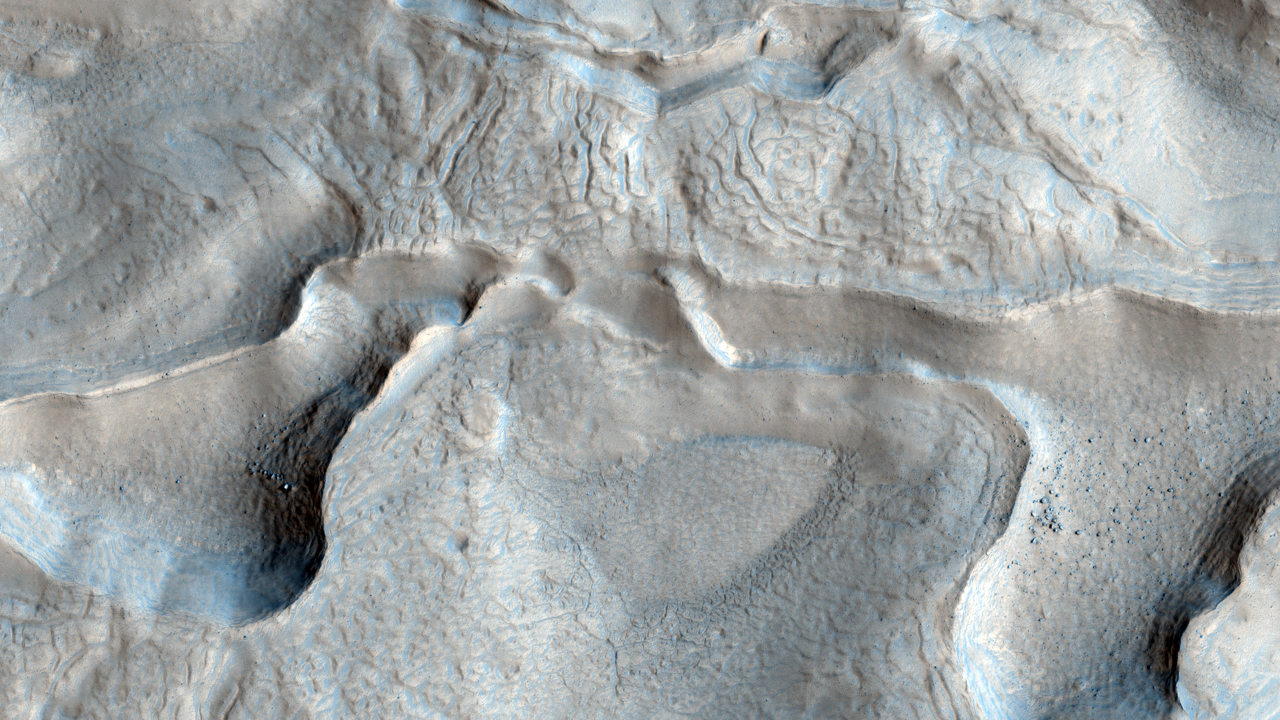
Glacial-like flow features near the Mamers Valles. Scarps and hills appear twisted like taffy, probably the result of the slow movement of the subsurface ice. Note the patterned ground at top center. These small-scale textures may be the result of sublimation (evaporation) of subsurface ice combined with the taffy-like shifts in the ground surface. Width of image is about a kilometer.

The Mamers Valles are a set of channels in a long, winding canyon in the north of Mars. They cover 1000 km, cutting through the cratered uplands of the Arabia Terra, from the Cerulli crater to the Deuteronilus Mensae near the edge of Mars' vast northern lowlands. Through their midsection, they average a width of 25 km and a depth of 1200 meters.

Theories of canyon formation include that Mamers Valles were formed by either water or lava, with the flow from south to north and additional material flowing from the slope toward the valley floor. According to the most popular theory, linear features on the valley bottom indicate possible ice flows and that ice may currently be plentiful. The Mamers Valles are dated to the early Hesperian period, about 3.8 billion years ago.

An infeeder canyon at the northwestern edge of the Mamers Valles, near their mouth (seen at the bottom of the photo at lower right), is a box canyon. Such canyons (with rounded headwalls and no obvious overland infeeders) have been widely presumed to have formed by a process of seepage erosion. However, it has been suggested that this side canyon was formed by a catastrophic flood event (Lamb, 2008). The case is supported by comparison with Box Canyon, Idaho, USA, which shows a similar morphology, but also exhibits features such as plunge pools, rock scours on the headwall rim, and a notch on the headwall rim, suggestive of large-volume flow.

The Mamers Valles were named in 1976, after the Oscan word for Mars.

== Gallery ==
Wide view of the Mamers Valles with cliffs, as seen by HiRISE.

Smooth cliff of the Mamers Valles. Note the lack of boulders. Much of the surface may have just been blown in or dropped from the sky (as dirty frost). Image from HiRISE.

Layered deposit in the Mamers Valles, as seen by HiRISE.
