= Scamander Vallis =

Vallis on Mars

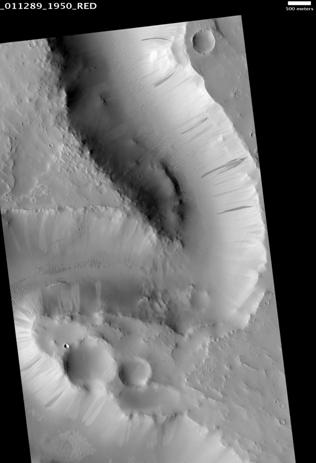
- Scamander Vallis, as seen by HiRISE. The full size image shows dark slope streaks in a variety of shades. The darker the streak the younger it is. Scale bar is 500 meters long.
- Coordinates: 16°N 28.5°E
- Naming: an ancient name of a river at Troy (modern Turkey)

Scamander Vallis is an ancient river valley in the Arabia quadrangle of Mars, located at coordinates 16ºN, 28.5ºE. It is 204 km long and was named after an ancient name of a river in Troy.
