= Paul Henry and Prosper Henry =

French opticians and astronomers

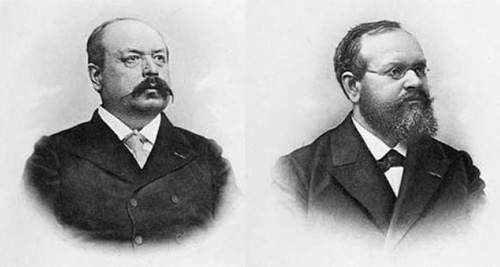
Paul Henry (left) and Prosper Henry (right)

Minor planets discovered: 14 (7 each)
see § List of discovered minor planets

Paul-Pierre Henry (21 August 1848 – 4 January 1905) and his brother Prosper-Mathieu Henry (10 December 1849 – 25 July 1903) were French opticians and astronomers.

They made refracting telescopes and instruments for observatories, and were involved in the origin of the Carte du Ciel project.

Between the two of them, they discovered a total of 14 asteroids. The Minor Planet Center credits their discoveries under "P. P. Henry" and "P. M. Henry", respectively. The lunar crater Henry Frères (Henry brothers) and the Martian crater Henry are named after them. They were jointly awarded the first Valz Prize in 1877 for their sky charts designed to facilitate the search for minor planets.

== List of discovered minor planets ==
Discoveries by Paul Henry (P. P. Henry)
| 126 Velleda | 5 November 1872 | list |
| 141 Lumen | 13 January 1875 | list |
| 152 Atala | 2 November 1875 | list |
| 159 Aemilia | 26 January 1876 | list |
| 164 Eva | 12 July 1876 | list |
| 177 Irma | 5 November 1877 | list |
| 227 Philosophia | 12 August 1882 | list |

Discoveries by Prosper Henry
| 125 Liberatrix | 11 September 1872 | list |
| 127 Johanna | 5 November 1872 | list |
| 148 Gallia | 7 August 1875 | list |
| 154 Bertha | 4 November 1875 | list |
| 162 Laurentia | 21 April 1876 | list |
| 169 Zelia | 28 September 1876 | list |
| 186 Celuta | 6 April 1878 | list |

== Obituaries ==
=== Paul Henry ===
- AN 167 (1905) 223/224 (in German)
- MNRAS 65 (1905) 349
- Obs 28 (1905) 110
- PASP 17 (1905) 77 (one paragraph)

=== Prosper Henry ===
- AN 163 (1903) 381/382 (in French)
- MNRAS 64 (1904) 296
- Obs 26 (1903) 396 (one paragraph)
- PASP 15 (1903) 230
