= Van Biesbroeck =

Van Biesbroeck may refer to:

People with the surname Van Biesbroeck

- George Van Biesbroeck (1880-1974) - astronomer
- Jules Evarist Van Biesbroeck (1848-1920)- artist
- Jules Pierre Van Biesbroeck (1873-1965) - artist
- Marguerite Van Biesbroeck (1875-1965) - artist

Other:

- 1781 Van Biesbroeck, a main-belt asteroid
- George Van Biesbroeck Prize
- Mount Van Biesbroeck, near the McDonald Observatory
- Van Biesbroeck, a lunar crater
- Van Biesbroeck's star (VB 10), a red dwarf
