= Kopff =

Kopff may refer to:

- 1631 Kopff, a main-belt asteroid
- Kopff (crater), a lunar crater

== People with the surname ==
- August Kopff (1882–1960), German astronomer
- E. Christian Kopff (born 1946), American academic, translator and writer
