= Eos family =

Asteroid family in the outer asteroid belt

The Eos family (adj. Eoan /iːˈoʊən/; FIN: 606) is a very large asteroid family located in the outer region of the asteroid belt. This family of K-type asteroids is believed to have formed as a result of an ancient catastrophic collision. The family's parent body is the asteroid 221 Eos.

== Description ==
In 1918, while the Japanese astronomer Kiyotsugu Hirayama was studying at Yale University, he began to examine asteroid motions. By plotting the mean motion, eccentricity and inclination of the asteroid orbits, he discovered that some of the objects formed groupings. In a 1918 paper, he described three such groups, including the Eos family with 19 members. Since that time, the number of members in the Eos family grouping has continued to grow, reaching 289 by 1993.

Currently there are about 16,000 known members of the Eos family. The inner orbit of the family is bracketed by the 7/3 mean-motion resonance with Jupiter at 2.96 AU. The orbital range also includes the 9/4 mean-motion resonance with Jupiter at 3.03 AU. Most of the family members lie within the latter orbital distance. The distribution of asteroid sizes suggests that the family is about 1–2 billion years old.

Hirayama hypothesized that these asteroid families were formed by a catastrophic collision with a parent body. This interpretation is still accepted today by the astronomy community. Observations of the Eos family show that they have a similar spectroscopic signature. Variation in the spectra is interpreted as compositional variation resulting from the partial differentiation of the parent body. That is, prior to the breakup, the parent body was partly segregated with denser materials moving toward the core. Since the breakup, the family members have undergone space weathering.

Asteroids in the Eos family resemble the S-type asteroid category. However, examination of Eos and other family members in the infrared show some differences with the S-type. As a result, the Eos family have been given their own category of K-type asteroids. In terms of meteorites collected on Earth, this category may be related to the CO3 or CV3 chondrites, instead of the OC type. Objects that share similar orbits with the Eos family but do not have this spectrum are assumed to be random interlopers.

The rotation rates of the Eos family asteroids are randomly distributed. This randomization resulted from subsequent collisions with other bodies, implying that the asteroids retain some "memory" of the rotation rate of the parent body. Thus the original object had a rotation rate of about 1–3 days. Evolutionary models of this spread in the rotation rate of the Eos family implies that this group may be comparable to the age of the Solar System. Numerical simulations of the collision that created the Eos family suggest that the smaller body was about a tenth the mass of the parent and struck from a direction out of the ecliptic plane. The parent object had an estimated diameter of 240 km. The best fit model implies a family age of 1.1 billion years.

Members of the Eos family include the asteroids 221 Eos, 339 Dorothea, 450 Brigitta, 513 Centesima, 562 Salome, 633 Zelima, 639 Latona, 651 Antikleia, 653 Berenike, 661 Cloelia, 669 Kypria, 742 Edisona, 766 Moguntia, 798 Ruth, 807 Ceraskia, 876 Scott and 890 Waltraut. Not all fragments of the original parent body have remained in the orbital zone occupied by the Eos family. Spectroscopic analysis has shown that some of these asteroids are now located in the 9:4 mean-motion resonance with Jupiter. These fugitives appear relatively young compared to the other family members.
