= 607 Jenny =

Minor planet (asteroid) orbiting in the Asteroid Belt

Discovery
- Discovered by: August Kopff
- Discovery site: Heidelberg
- Discovery date: 18 September 1906

Designations
- Alternative designations: 1906 VC

Orbital characteristics
- Epoch 31 July 2016 (JD 2457600.5)
- Uncertainty parameter 0
- Observation arc: 109.51 yr (40000 d)
- Aphelion: 3.0629 AU (458.20 Gm)
- Perihelion: 2.6435 AU (395.46 Gm)
- Semi-major axis: 2.8532 AU (426.83 Gm)
- Eccentricity: 0.073505
- Orbital period (sidereal): 4.82 yr (1760.3 d)
- Mean anomaly: 76.6844°
- Mean motion: 0° 12^{m} 16.236^{s} / day
- Inclination: 10.109°
- Longitude of ascending node: 285.271°
- Argument of perihelion: 290.172°

Physical characteristics
- Mean radius: 31.39±1.05 km
- Synodic rotation period: 8.521 h (0.3550 d)
- Geometric albedo: 0.0711±0.005
- Absolute magnitude (H): 10.0

607 Jenny is a minor planet, specifically an asteroid orbiting in the asteroid belt that was discovered by German astronomer August Kopff on September 18, 1906.

Like 608 Adolfine it was named after Jenny Adolfine Kessler, a friend of the astronomer.

Photometric observations of this asteroid at Palmer Divide Observatory in Colorado Springs, Colorado during 2007 gave a light curve with a period of 8.524 ± 0.005 hours and a brightness variation of 0.21 ± 0.03 in magnitude. Results reported in 2003 giving a period of 7.344 hours were deemed the result of a data ambiguity.
