= 1130 Skuld =

Florian asteroid

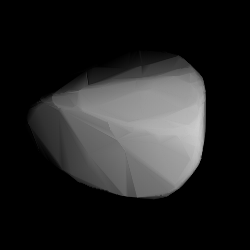
- Modelled shape of Skuld from its lightcurve

Discovery
- Discovered by: K. Reinmuth
- Discovery site: Heidelberg Obs.
- Discovery date: 2 September 1929

Designations
- Named after: Skuld (Norse mythology)
- Alternative designations: 1929 RC · 1928 FJ; 1949 UD · 1962 LA; A906 VC
- Minor planet category: main-belt · Flora

Orbital characteristics
- Epoch 4 September 2017 (JD 2458000.5)
- Uncertainty parameter 0
- Observation arc: 110.38 yr (40,316 days)
- Aphelion: 2.6701 AU
- Perihelion: 1.7864 AU
- Semi-major axis: 2.2282 AU
- Eccentricity: 0.1983
- Orbital period (sidereal): 3.33 yr (1,215 days)
- Mean anomaly: 173.35°
- Mean motion: 0° 17^{m} 46.68^{s} / day
- Inclination: 2.1677°
- Longitude of ascending node: 216.13°
- Argument of perihelion: 113.81°

Physical characteristics
- Dimensions: 9.63±0.44 km 9.99 km (derived); 10.125±0.092 km 10.24±0.64 km 11.009±0.091 km
- Synodic rotation period: 4.73±0.02 h 4.807±0.002 h 4.8079±0.0005 h 4.810 h (Note: Robinson (2011) web: rotation period 4.810 hours with a brightness amplitude of 0.5 mag. Summary figures for (1130) Skuld at 2=Collaborative Asteroid Lightcurve Link (CALL))
- Geometric albedo: 0.1995±0.0461; 0.24 (assumed); 0.244±0.033; 0.302±0.031
- Spectral type: S
- Absolute magnitude (H): 12.0 · 12.10 · 12.17 · 12.17±0.02

1130 Skuld, provisional designation 1929 RC, is a stony Florian asteroid from the inner regions of the asteroid belt, approximately 10 kilometers in diameter. It was named after Skuld from Norse mythology.

== Discovery ==
Skuld was discovered on 2 September 1929, by German astronomer Karl Reinmuth at Heidelberg Observatory in southwest Germany. The body was independently discovered by astronomers and fellow countrymen Arnold Schwassmann and Arno Wachmann at the Hamburger Bergedorf Observatory ten nights later.

It was first identified as A906 VC at Heidelberg in 1906, extending the asteroid's observation arc by 23 years prior to its official discovery observation.

== Orbit and classification ==
Skuld is a member of the Flora family, one of the largest groups of stony S-type asteroids in the main-belt. It orbits the Sun in the inner main-belt at a distance of 1.8–2.7 AU once every 3 years and 4 months (1,215 days). Its orbit has an eccentricity of 0.20 and an inclination of 2° with respect to the ecliptic.

== Naming ==
This minor planet was named after Skuld, one of the three Norns in Norse mythology. The asteroids 167 Urda and 621 Werdandi are named after the other two Norns. Naming citation was first mentioned in The Names of the Minor Planets by Paul Herget in 1955 (H 110).

== Physical characteristics ==
=== Rotation period ===
In January 2004, the first rotational lightcurves of Skuld were obtained by Henk de Groot and by a group of Polish and French astronomers. Lightcurve analysis gave a rotation period of 4.73 and 4.8079 hours with a brightness variation of 0.46 and 0.40 magnitude, respectively (U=2+/3-).

In 2009 and 2011, astronomers Robert Buchheim and Larry Robinson obtained two well-defined lightcurves from photometric observations. They gave a refined period of 4.810 and 4.807 hours with an amplitude of 0.50 and 0.26 magnitude, respectively (U=3/3).

=== Diameter and albedo ===
According to the surveys carried out by the Japanese Akari satellite and NASA's Wide-field Infrared Survey Explorer with its subsequent NEOWISE mission, Skuld measures between 9.63 and 11.009 kilometers in diameter and its surface has an albedo between 0.1995 and 0.302. The Collaborative Asteroid Lightcurve Link assumes an albedo of 0.24 – derived from 8 Flora, the largest member and namesake of this orbital family – and calculates a diameter of 9.99 kilometers with an absolute magnitude of 12.17.
