= Brangane =

Brangane can refer to:

- 606 Brangäne, an asteroid orbiting the Sun
- A character from Tristan und Isolde

== See also ==
- Brangaine
