= 291 (disambiguation) =

291 is a year.

291 may also refer to:

- 291 (number)
- The year 291 BC
- 291 (art gallery), an art gallery in Midtown Manhattan, 1905–1917
- 291 (magazine), an arts and literary magazine, 1915–1916
- 291 Alice, an asteroid
- Interstate 291 (Massachusetts), an Interstate highway in Massachusetts
- Interstate 291 (Connecticut), an Interstate highway in Connecticut
