= Adelgunde =

Adelgunde is a German female name. It may refer to:

People

- Princess Adelgunde of Bavaria (1823–1914)
- Princess Adelgunde of Bavaria (1870–1958)
- Adelgunde Vogt, Danish sculptor

Other

- 647 Adelgunde, an asteroid in the asteroid belt
