= Vesta family =

Asteroid family

The Vesta family (adj. Vestian; FIN: 401) is a family of asteroids. The cratering family is located in the inner asteroid belt in the vicinity of its namesake and principal body, 4 Vesta. It is one of the largest asteroid families with more than 15,000 known members and consists of mostly bright V-type asteroids, so-called "vestoids".

== Characteristics ==
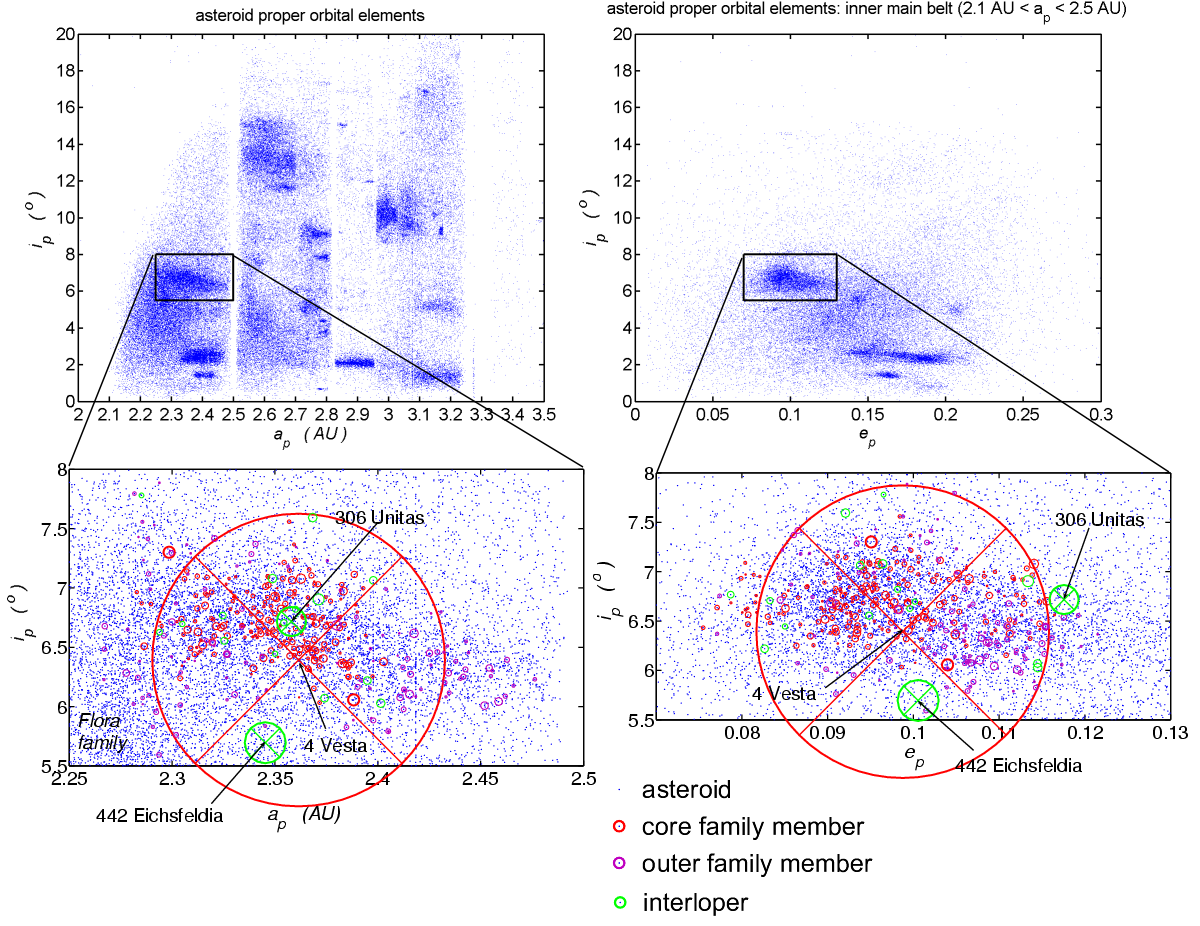
Location and structure of the Vesta family. The graphs plot asteroids by inclination and semi-major axis (left) and by inclination and eccentricity (right)

The Vestian asteroids consist of 4 Vesta, the second-most-massive of all asteroids (mean diameter of 530 km), and many small asteroids below 10 km diameter. The brightest of these, 1929 Kollaa and 2045 Peking, have an absolute magnitude of 12.2, which would give them a radius of about 7.5 km assuming the same high albedo as 4 Vesta.

The family originated from an impact on asteroid 4 Vesta, with the giant south-polar crater the likely impact site. The family are thought to be the source of the HED meteorites.

The Vesta family also includes a few J-type asteroids (related to the V-type), which are thought to have come from the deeper layers of Vesta's crust, and are similar to the diogenite meteorites.

A HCM numerical analysis (by Zappala 1995) determined a large group of 'core' family members, whose proper orbital elements lie in the approximate ranges:

	a_{p}	e_{p}	i_{p}
min	2.26 AU	0.075	5.6°
max	2.48 AU	0.122	7.9°

This gives the approximate boundaries of the family. At the present epoch, the range of osculating orbital elements of these core members is:

	a	e	i
min	2.26 AU	0.035	5.0°
max	2.48 AU	0.162	8.3°

The Zappala 1995 analysis found 235 core members. A search of a recent proper-element database (AstDys) for 96,944 minor planets in 2005 yielded 6,051 objects (about 6% of the total) lying within the Vesta-family region as per the first table above.

== Large members ==
Mass distribution of the Vesta family (assuming similar densities)
1. 4 Vesta 2,620 (98.0%)
2. 63 Ausonia 50.7 (1.90%)
3. All other members 1.84 (0.07%)

The 10 brightest Vesta family members
Name	Abs. Mag	Size (km)	proper a (AU)	proper e	proper i
4 Vesta	3.25	525	2.3615	0.099	6.393
63 Ausonia	7.13	116	2.3952	0.121	6.216
556 Phyllis	9.54	36	2.4654	0.119	6.065
1145 Robelmonte	11.47	24	2.4243	0.124	6.598
2045 Peking	12.21	9.7	2.3799	0.090	6.685
2346 Lilio	12.52	10	2.3712	0.113	6.904
3376 Armandhammer	12.53	7.9	2.3488	0.096	7.079
1906 Naef	12.54	7.9	2.3736	0.099	6.405
2590 Mourao	12.56	7.9	2.3425	0.097	6.762
2086 Newell	12.57	6.1	2.4015	0.115	6.028

== Interlopers ==
Spectroscopic analyses have shown that some of the largest Vestians are in fact interlopers. They are not of the V or J spectral class, but have similar orbital elements by coincidence. These include 306 Unitas, 442 Eichsfeldia, 1697 Koskenniemi, 1781 Van Biesbroeck, 2024 McLaughlin, 2029 Binomi, 2086 Newell, 2346 Lilio, and others. (Identified by inspection of the PDS asteroid taxonomy data set).
