= 651 (disambiguation) =

651 may refer to:

- 651 (year)
- 651 (number)
- 651 BC
- 651 series
- Area code 651
- 651 Antikleia
