= 670 Ottegebe =

Main-belt asteroid

Discovery
- Discovered by: August Kopff
- Discovery site: Heidelberg
- Discovery date: 20 August 1908

Designations
- Alternative designations: 1908 DR

Orbital characteristics
- Epoch 31 July 2016 (JD 2457600.5)
- Uncertainty parameter 0
- Observation arc: 108.91 yr (39781 d)
- Aphelion: 3.3465 AU (500.63 Gm)
- Perihelion: 2.2587 AU (337.90 Gm)
- Semi-major axis: 2.8026 AU (419.26 Gm)
- Eccentricity: 0.19406
- Orbital period (sidereal): 4.69 yr (1713.7 d)
- Mean anomaly: 333.660°
- Mean motion: 0° 12^{m} 36.252^{s} / day
- Inclination: 7.5354°
- Longitude of ascending node: 174.687°
- Argument of perihelion: 195.276°

Physical characteristics
- Mean radius: 17.035±0.65 km
- Synodic rotation period: 10.045 h (0.4185 d)
- Geometric albedo: 0.1830±0.015
- Absolute magnitude (H): 9.4

670 Ottegebe is a minor planet orbiting the Sun. In 2007 lightcurve data showed that Ottegebe rotates every 10.041 ± 0.002 hours. The name refers to a character in Gerhardt Hauptmann's play Der arme Heinrich. It is orbiting close to a 5:2 mean motion resonance with Jupiter, which is located at 2.824 AU.
