= 632 Pyrrha =

Main-belt asteroid

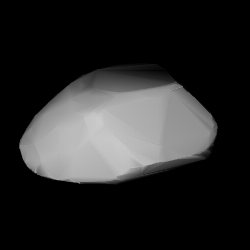
- Modelled shape of Pyrrha from its lightcurve

Discovery
- Discovered by: August Kopff
- Discovery site: Heidelberg
- Discovery date: 5 April 1907

Designations
- Pronunciation: /ˈpɪrə/,
- Alternative designations: 1907 YX

Orbital characteristics
- Epoch 31 July 2016 (JD 2457600.5)
- Uncertainty parameter 0
- Observation arc: 109.03 yr (39823 d)
- Aphelion: 3.1695 AU (474.15 Gm)
- Perihelion: 2.1583 AU (322.88 Gm)
- Semi-major axis: 2.6639 AU (398.51 Gm)
- Eccentricity: 0.18979
- Orbital period (sidereal): 4.35 yr (1588.1 d)
- Mean anomaly: 33.9510°
- Mean motion: 0° 13^{m} 36.084^{s} / day
- Inclination: 2.2156°
- Longitude of ascending node: 356.505°
- Argument of perihelion: 252.767°

Physical characteristics
- Synodic rotation period: 4.1167 h (0.17153 d)
- Absolute magnitude (H): 11.4

632 Pyrrha is a minor planet orbiting the Sun.

Photometric observations of the minor planet in 2011 gave a rotation period of 4.1167±0.001 h with an amplitude of 0.40±0.04 in magnitude. This result rules out previous determinations of the period.
