= 693 Zerbinetta =

Main-belt asteroid

Discovery
- Discovered by: August Kopff
- Discovery site: Heidelberg
- Discovery date: 21 September 1909

Designations
- Alternative designations: 1909 HN, 1949 QB, 1949 SW1, 1952 DR3

Orbital characteristics
- Epoch 13 January 2016 (JD 2457400.5)
- Uncertainty parameter 0
- Observation arc: 38866 days (106.41 yr)
- Aphelion: 3.0369 AU (454.31 Gm)
- Perihelion: 2.8506 AU (426.44 Gm)
- Semi-major axis: 2.9438 AU (440.39 Gm)
- Eccentricity: 0.031644
- Orbital period (sidereal): 5.05 yr (1844.8 d)
- Mean anomaly: 101.77°
- Mean motion: 0° 11^{m} 42.504^{s} / day
- Inclination: 14.195°
- Longitude of ascending node: 351.875°
- Argument of perihelion: 288.790°

Physical characteristics
- Mean radius: 33.83 ± 0.65 km
- Synodic rotation period: 11.475 h (0.4781 d)
- Geometric albedo: 0.0683 ± 0.003
- Absolute magnitude (H): 9.5

693 Zerbinetta is a minor planet orbiting the Sun. It was discovered on 21 September 1909 by August Kopff in Heidelberg and named after a character in Richard Strauss' opera Ariadne auf Naxos.

Between 2003 and 2022, 693 Zerbinetta was observed to occult seventeen stars.
