= 591 Irmgard =

Minor planet orbiting the Sun

Discovery
- Discovered by: August Kopff
- Discovery site: Heidelberg
- Discovery date: 14 March 1906

Designations
- Pronunciation: German: [ˈɪʁmɡaːt]
- Alternative designations: 1906 TP

Orbital characteristics
- Epoch 31 July 2016 (JD 2457600.5)
- Uncertainty parameter 0
- Observation arc: 110.08 yr (40205 d)
- Aphelion: 3.2342 AU (483.83 Gm)
- Perihelion: 2.1241 AU (317.76 Gm)
- Semi-major axis: 2.6792 AU (400.80 Gm)
- Eccentricity: 0.20718
- Orbital period (sidereal): 4.39 yr (1601.8 d)
- Mean anomaly: 43.3627°
- Mean motion: 0° 13^{m} 29.1^{s} / day
- Inclination: 12.490°
- Longitude of ascending node: 334.289°
- Argument of perihelion: 217.191°

Physical characteristics
- Mean radius: 25.93±0.65 km
- Synodic rotation period: 7.35 h (0.306 d)
- Geometric albedo: 0.0364±0.002
- Absolute magnitude (H): 10.64

591 Irmgard is a minor planet orbiting the Sun.
