= 627 Charis =

Main-belt asteroid

Discovery
- Discovered by: A. Kopff
- Discovery site: Heidelberg Obs.
- Discovery date: 4 March 1907

Designations
- Pronunciation: /ˈkeɪrɪs/
- Named after: Charis (Greek mythology)
- Alternative designations: 1907 XS · 1929 RJ_{1} 1929 RN_{1} · 1932 CZ; 1947 GK · 1966 DR; A917 DE
- Minor planet category: main-belt · (outer); Charis

Orbital characteristics
- Epoch 4 September 2017 (JD 2458000.5)
- Uncertainty parameter 0
- Observation arc: 110.65 yr (40,415 days)
- Aphelion: 3.0675 AU
- Perihelion: 2.7320 AU
- Semi-major axis: 2.8998 AU
- Eccentricity: 0.0578
- Orbital period (sidereal): 4.94 yr (1,804 days)
- Mean anomaly: 318.92°
- Mean motion: 0° 11^{m} 58.56^{s} / day
- Inclination: 6.4732°
- Longitude of ascending node: 142.48°
- Argument of perihelion: 176.72°

Physical characteristics
- Dimensions: 38.018±0.146 km 44.745±0.140 km 48.51±2.6 km 49.47±0.51 km 62.68±0.41 km
- Synodic rotation period: >24 h (dated); 27.888±0.002 h
- Geometric albedo: 0.047±0.007; 0.0786±0.009; 0.080±0.002; 0.0925±0.0225
- Spectral type: Tholen = XB: SMASS = X · P B–V = 0.680; U–B = 0.261
- Absolute magnitude (H): 9.44±0.85 · 9.95

627 Charis /ˈkeɪrɪs/ is an asteroid and the parent body of the Charis family, located in the outer regions of the asteroid belt, approximately 49 kilometers in diameter. It was discovered on 4 March 1907, by German astronomer August Kopff at the Heidelberg-Königstuhl State Observatory in southwest Germany. The asteroid was named after the Greek goddess Charis, a name which may have been inspired by the asteroid's provisional designation 1907 XS. ('Charis' is in Greek is spelled 'Χάρις'.)

== Orbit and classification ==
Charis is the parent body of the Charis family (616), an asteroid family of more than 800 known members. It orbits the Sun in the outer main-belt at a distance of 2.7–3.1 AU once every 4 years and 11 months (1,804 days; semi-major axis of 2.90 AU). Its orbit has an eccentricity of 0.06 and an inclination of 6° with respect to the ecliptic. The body's observation arc begins with its official discovery observation at Heidelberg in March 1907.

== Physical characteristics ==
The overall spectral type for members of the Charis family is that of a C- and X-type. In the SMASS classification Charis is an X-type asteroid, while in the Tholen classification, its type is ambiguous, closest to an X- and somewhat similar to a carbonaceous B-type asteroid including a reported noisy spectrum (XB:). Conversely, the Wide-field Infrared Survey Explorer (WISE) characterized it as a primitive P-type asteroid.

=== Rotation period ===
Photometric observations of this asteroid by American astronomer Frederick Pilcher at the Organ Mesa Observatory (G50) in Las Cruces, New Mexico, during May 2012 gave a well-defined lightcurve with a rotation period of 27.888 hours and a brightness variation of 0.35 in magnitude (U=3). The result supersedes a tentative period of at least 24 hours obtained by French amateur astronomer Pierre Antonini in March 2011 (U=2-).

=== Diameter and albedo ===
According to the surveys carried out by the Infrared Astronomical Satellite IRAS, the Japanese Akari satellite and the NEOWISE mission of NASA's WISE telescope, Charis measures between 38.018 and 62.68 kilometers in diameter and its surface has an albedo between 0.047 and 0.0925.

The Collaborative Asteroid Lightcurve Link adopts the results obtained by IRAS, that is, an albedo of 0.0786 and a diameter of 48.51 kilometers based on an absolute magnitude of 9.95.

== Naming ==
This minor planet was named from Greek mythology, after the goddess Charis, the wife of Hephaestus after whom the minor planet 2212 Hephaistos was also named. The official naming citation was mentioned in The Names of the Minor Planets by Paul Herget in 1955 (H 65).
