= 612 Veronika =

Main-belt asteroid

Discovery
- Discovered by: August Kopff
- Discovery site: Heidelberg
- Discovery date: 8 October 1906

Designations
- Pronunciation: classically /vɛrəˈnaɪkə/
- Alternative designations: 1906 VN

Orbital characteristics
- Epoch 31 July 2016 (JD 2457600.5)
- Uncertainty parameter 0
- Observation arc: 109.52 yr (40003 d)
- Aphelion: 3.9729 AU (594.34 Gm)
- Perihelion: 2.3415 AU (350.28 Gm)
- Semi-major axis: 3.1572 AU (472.31 Gm)
- Eccentricity: 0.25837
- Orbital period (sidereal): 5.61 yr (2049.1 d)
- Mean anomaly: 262.948°
- Mean motion: 0° 10^{m} 32.484^{s} / day
- Inclination: 20.943°
- Longitude of ascending node: 202.904°
- Argument of perihelion: 122.046°

Physical characteristics
- Mean radius: 18.87±0.6 km
- Synodic rotation period: 8.243 h (0.3435 d)
- Geometric albedo: 0.0411±0.003
- Absolute magnitude (H): 10.7

612 Veronika is a minor planet orbiting the Sun. It was discovered on 8 October 1906 by August Kopff from Heidelberg. The reason for the name is unknown; asteroid etymologist Lutz D. Schmadel suspects that it may have been inspired by the letter code "VN" in its provisional designation, 1906 VN.
