= 648 Pippa =

Minor planet

Discovery
- Discovered by: August Kopff
- Discovery site: Heidelberg
- Discovery date: 11 September 1907

Designations
- Alternative designations: 1907 AE

Orbital characteristics
- Epoch 31 July 2016 (JD 2457600.5)
- Uncertainty parameter 0
- Observation arc: 108.44 yr (39606 d)
- Aphelion: 3.8302 AU (572.99 Gm)
- Perihelion: 2.5847 AU (386.67 Gm)
- Semi-major axis: 3.2075 AU (479.84 Gm)
- Eccentricity: 0.19416
- Orbital period (sidereal): 5.74 yr (2098.2 d)
- Mean anomaly: 327.76°
- Mean motion: 0° 10^{m} 17.688^{s} / day
- Inclination: 9.8005°
- Longitude of ascending node: 291.226°
- Argument of perihelion: 178.170°

Physical characteristics
- Mean radius: 34.135±0.8 km
- Synodic rotation period: 9.263 h (0.3860 d)
- Geometric albedo: 0.0509±0.002
- Absolute magnitude (H): 9.68

648 Pippa is a minor planet orbiting the Sun. Photometric measurements made from the Oakley Southern Sky Observatory during 2012 gave a light curve with a period of 9.263 ± 0.001 hours and a variation in brightness of 0.31 ± 0.03 in magnitude. This is inconsistent with a period estimate of 5.2 ± 0.3 made in 2004. It was named after Pippa, the title character in Gerhardt Hauptmann's novel Und Pippa tanzt.
