= 3133 Sendai =

Main-belt asteroid

Discovery
- Discovered by: A. Kopff
- Discovery site: Heidelberg Obs.
- Discovery date: 4 October 1907

Designations
- Named after: Sendai (Japanese city)
- Alternative designations: A907 TC · 1968 TO; 1973 DN · 1981 UX; 1984 QG_{1} · A907 XA
- Minor planet category: main-belt · Flora

Orbital characteristics
- Epoch 4 September 2017 (JD 2458000.5)
- Uncertainty parameter 0
- Observation arc: 109.19 yr (39,882 days)
- Aphelion: 2.5314 AU
- Perihelion: 1.8299 AU
- Semi-major axis: 2.1806 AU
- Eccentricity: 0.1608
- Orbital period (sidereal): 3.22 yr (1,176 days)
- Mean anomaly: 44.618°
- Mean motion: 0° 18^{m} 21.96^{s} / day
- Inclination: 6.5666°
- Longitude of ascending node: 37.160°
- Argument of perihelion: 358.26°

Physical characteristics
- Dimensions: 7.25±0.30 km 7.47 km (calculated); 8.323±0.066 km
- Synodic rotation period: 5.7491±0.0008 h 5.776±0.005 h (Note: Megna (2011) web: rotation period 5.776±0.005 hours with a brightness amplitude of 0.19 mag. Light-curve chart at Ralph Megna's website and summary figures for (3133) Sendai at Collaborative Asteroid Lightcurve Link (CALL).)
- Geometric albedo: 0.2131±0.0373; 0.24 (assumed); 0.307±0.039
- Spectral type: S
- Absolute magnitude (H): 12.8 · 12.7 · 12.7 · 12.522±0.001 (R) · 12.92±0.21

3133 Sendai, provisional designation A907 TC, is a stony Flora asteroid from the inner regions of the asteroid belt, approximately 8 kilometers in diameter. It was discovered on 4 October 1907, by German astronomer August Kopff at Heidelberg Observatory in southwest Germany. The asteroid was named for the Japanese city of Sendai.

== Orbit and classification ==
Sendai is a member of the Flora family, one of the largest groups of stony asteroids in the main-belt. It orbits the Sun in the inner main-belt at a distance of 1.8–2.5 AU once every 3 years and 3 months (1,176 days). Its orbit has an eccentricity of 0.16 and an inclination of 7° with respect to the ecliptic.

== Physical characteristics ==
Sendai has been characterized as a stony S-type asteroid.

=== Diameter and albedo ===
According to the surveys carried out by NASA's Wide-field Infrared Survey Explorer and its extended NEOWISE mission, the asteroid's surface has an albedo of 0.21 and 0.31, with a diameter of 8.3 and 7.3 kilometers, respectively. The Collaborative Asteroid Lightcurve Link assumes an intermediate albedo of 0.24 – which derives from 8 Flora, the largest member and namesake of this orbital family – and calculates a concurring diameter of 7.5 kilometers.

=== Lightcurves ===
In 2010, two rotational lightcurves were obtained by amateur astronomer Ralph Megna at Goat Mountain Astronomical Research Station (G79), and by the U.S. Palomar Transient Factory in California. The concurring lightcurves showed a rotation period of 5.776±0.005 and 5.7491±0.0008 hours, respectively (U=3-/2).

== Naming ==
This minor planet was named for the second largest city north of Tokyo, Sendai (pop. 1 million), location of the Tōhoku University. It is the home of the Sendai Astronomical Observatory, which was founded in 1955, on appeal by the Sendai Amateur Astronomical Association. The observatory has discovered several minor planets. The official naming citation was published by the Minor Planet Center on 29 September 1985 (M.P.C. 10045).
