= 582 Olympia =

Main-belt asteroid

Discovery
- Discovered by: A. Kopff
- Discovery site: Heidelberg
- Discovery date: 23 January 1906

Designations
- Pronunciation: /əˈlɪmpiə/
- Alternative designations: 1906 SO

Orbital characteristics
- Epoch 31 July 2016 (JD 2457600.5)
- Uncertainty parameter 0
- Observation arc: 110.23 yr (40261 d)
- Aphelion: 3.1910 AU (477.37 Gm)
- Perihelion: 2.0291 AU (303.55 Gm)
- Semi-major axis: 2.6100 AU (390.45 Gm)
- Eccentricity: 0.22258
- Orbital period (sidereal): 4.22 yr (1540.2 d)
- Mean anomaly: 87.2520°
- Mean motion: 0° 14^{m} 1.464^{s} / day
- Inclination: 30.036°
- Longitude of ascending node: 155.717°
- Argument of perihelion: 310.537°

Physical characteristics
- Mean radius: 21.705±1.3 km 21.695 ± 0.745 km
- Mass: (0.43 ± 1.17) × 10^{18} kg
- Synodic rotation period: 36.312 h (1.5130 d)
- Geometric albedo: 0.2128±0.028
- Absolute magnitude (H): 9.11

582 Olympia is a minor planet orbiting the Sun.
