= 646 Kastalia =

Main-belt asteroid

Discovery
- Discovered by: August Kopff
- Discovery site: Heidelberg
- Discovery date: 11 September 1907

Designations
- Pronunciation: /kæˈsteɪliə/
- Alternative designations: 1907 AC

Orbital characteristics
- Epoch 31 July 2016 (JD 2457600.5)
- Uncertainty parameter 0
- Observation arc: 108.60 yr (39665 d)
- Aphelion: 2.8200 AU (421.87 Gm)
- Perihelion: 1.8300 AU (273.76 Gm)
- Semi-major axis: 2.3250 AU (347.82 Gm)
- Eccentricity: 0.21291
- Orbital period (sidereal): 3.55 yr (1294.9 d)
- Mean anomaly: 266.366°
- Mean motion: 0° 16^{m} 40.872^{s} / day
- Inclination: 6.9010°
- Longitude of ascending node: 302.820°
- Argument of perihelion: 38.142°

Physical characteristics
- Dimensions: 8.15±0.15 km
- Absolute magnitude (H): 12.6

646 Kastalia is a minor planet orbiting the Sun, not to be confused with the near-Earth asteroid 4769 Castalia.
