= 2037 Tripaxeptalis =

Main-belt asteroid

Discovery
- Discovered by: P. Wild
- Discovery site: Zimmerwald Obs.
- Discovery date: 25 October 1973

Designations
- Named after: Tripaxeptalis (fantasy name) (3 × 679 Pax = 7 × 291 Alice)
- Alternative designations: 1973 UB · A917 SN
- Minor planet category: main-belt · Flora

Orbital characteristics
- Epoch 4 September 2017 (JD 2458000.5)
- Uncertainty parameter 0
- Observation arc: 43.52 yr (15,894 days)
- Aphelion: 2.6046 AU
- Perihelion: 1.9996 AU
- Semi-major axis: 2.3021 AU
- Eccentricity: 0.1314
- Orbital period (sidereal): 3.49 yr (1,276 days)
- Mean anomaly: 235.93°
- Mean motion: 0° 16^{m} 55.92^{s} / day
- Inclination: 4.2509°
- Longitude of ascending node: 9.5018°
- Argument of perihelion: 346.18°

Physical characteristics
- Dimensions: 5.956±0.213 km 6.21 km (calculated)
- Synodic rotation period: 2.33±0.01 h
- Geometric albedo: 0.198±0.032; 0.24 (assumed)
- Spectral type: S
- Absolute magnitude (H): 13.2 · 13.44±0.12 · 13.5

2037 Tripaxeptalis, provisional designation 1973 UB, is a stony Florian asteroid from the inner regions of the asteroid belt, approximately 6 kilometers in diameter.

It was discovered on 25 October 1973, by Swiss astronomer Paul Wild at Zimmerwald Observatory near Bern, Switzerland. The asteroid's constructed name "Tripaxeptalis" derives from a numbers game with the asteroids 679 Pax and 291 Alice.

== Orbit and classification ==
Tripaxeptalis is a member of the Flora family, one of the largest collisional populations of stony asteroids. It orbits the Sun in the inner main-belt at a distance of 2.0–2.6 AU once every 3 years and 6 months (1,276 days). Its orbit has an eccentricity of 0.13 and an inclination of 4° with respect to the ecliptic.

In September 1917, the asteroid was first identified as A917 SN at Simeiz Observatory on the Crimean peninsula. The body's observation arc begins with its official discovery observation at Zimmerwald.

== Physical characteristics ==
=== Rotation period ===
In January 2006, a rotational lightcurve of Tripaxeptalis was obtained from photometric observations by astronomer Adrián Galád at Modra Observatory in Slovakia. Lightcurve analysis gave a rotation period of 2.33 hours with a brightness variation of 0.10 magnitude (U=2). The ambiguous lightcurve gave an alternative period solution of 2.23 hours and an amplitude of 0.10.

=== Diameter and albedo ===
According to the survey carried out by the NEOWISE mission of NASA's Wide-field Infrared Survey Explorer, Tripaxeptalis measures 5.956 kilometers in diameter and its surface has an albedo of 0.198. The Collaborative Asteroid Lightcurve Link assumes an albedo of 0.24 – derived from 8 Flora, the largest member and namesake of its family – and calculates a diameter of 6.21 kilometers based on an absolute magnitude of 13.2.

== Naming ==
This minor planet's constructed name "Tripaxeptalis" (tri–Pax–hepta–Alice) refers to the fact that its number, 2037, matches 3 × 679 Pax as well as 7 × 291 Alice. The approved naming citation was published by the Minor Planet Center on 1 June 1980 (M.P.C. 5359).
