= 634 Ute =

Main-belt asteroid

Discovery
- Discovered by: August Kopff
- Discovery site: Heidelberg
- Discovery date: 12 May 1907

Designations
- Pronunciation: /ˈjuːt/
- Alternative designations: 1907 ZN

Orbital characteristics
- Epoch 31 July 2016 (JD 2457600.5)
- Uncertainty parameter 0
- Observation arc: 108.89 yr (39772 d)
- Aphelion: 3.6093 AU (539.94 Gm)
- Perihelion: 2.4805 AU (371.08 Gm)
- Semi-major axis: 3.0449 AU (455.51 Gm)
- Eccentricity: 0.18536
- Orbital period (sidereal): 5.31 yr (1940.7 d)
- Mean anomaly: 96.526°
- Mean motion: 0° 11^{m} 7.8^{s} / day
- Inclination: 12.289°
- Longitude of ascending node: 133.446°
- Argument of perihelion: 220.467°

Physical characteristics
- Mean radius: 34.72±2.05 km
- Synodic rotation period: 11.7554 h (0.48981 d)
- Geometric albedo: 0.0530±0.007
- Absolute magnitude (H): 9.8

634 Ute is a minor planet orbiting the Sun.
