= 649 Josefa =

Main-belt asteroid

Discovery
- Discovered by: August Kopff
- Discovery site: Heidelberg
- Discovery date: 11 September 1907

Designations
- Alternative designations: 1907 AF

Orbital characteristics
- Epoch 31 July 2016 (JD 2457600.5)
- Uncertainty parameter 0
- Observation arc: 108.60 yr (39665 d)
- Aphelion: 3.2555 AU (487.02 Gm)
- Perihelion: 1.8371 AU (274.83 Gm)
- Semi-major axis: 2.5463 AU (380.92 Gm)
- Eccentricity: 0.27852
- Orbital period (sidereal): 4.06 yr (1484.1 d)
- Mean anomaly: 273.84°
- Mean motion: 0° 14^{m} 33.252^{s} / day
- Inclination: 12.715°
- Longitude of ascending node: 357.035°
- Argument of perihelion: 349.562°

Physical characteristics
- Synodic rotation period: 10.481 h (0.4367 d)
- Absolute magnitude (H): 12.7

649 Josefa is a minor planet, specifically an asteroid, orbiting primarily in the asteroid belt. Photometric observations provide a rotation period of 10.481±0.001 h with a brightness variation of 0.33±0.04 in magnitude.
