= 628 Christine =

Main-belt asteroid

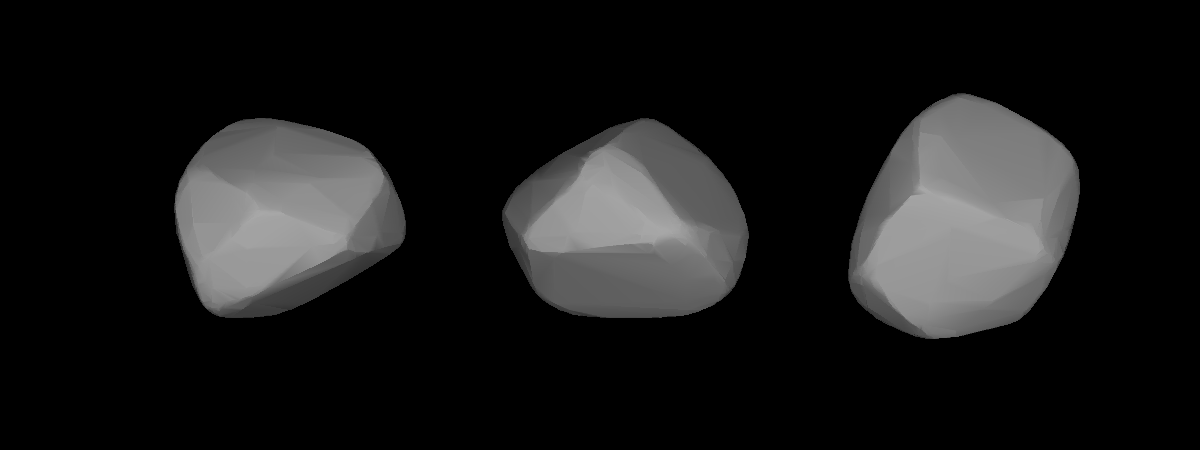
- A three-dimensional model of 628 Christine based on its light curve

Discovery
- Discovered by: August Kopff
- Discovery site: Heidelberg
- Discovery date: 7 March 1907

Designations
- Alternative designations: 1907 XT

Orbital characteristics
- Epoch 31 July 2016 (JD 2457600.5)
- Uncertainty parameter 0
- Observation arc: 109.12 yr (39856 d)
- Aphelion: 2.6931 AU (402.88 Gm)
- Perihelion: 2.4696 AU (369.45 Gm)
- Semi-major axis: 2.5813 AU (386.16 Gm)
- Eccentricity: 0.043303
- Orbital period (sidereal): 4.15 yr (1514.8 d)
- Mean anomaly: 325.02°
- Mean motion: 0° 14^{m} 15.54^{s} / day
- Inclination: 11.527°
- Longitude of ascending node: 112.123°
- Argument of perihelion: 207.566°

Physical characteristics
- Mean radius: 24.86±1.2 km
- Synodic rotation period: 16.1783 h (0.67410 d)
- Geometric albedo: 0.1426±0.015
- Absolute magnitude (H): 9.25

628 Christine is a minor planet orbiting the Sun.
