= 654 Zelinda =

Asteroid

Discovery
- Discovered by: August Kopff
- Discovery site: Heidelberg
- Discovery date: 4 January 1908

Designations
- Alternative designations: 1908 BM

Orbital characteristics
- Epoch 31 July 2016 (JD 2457600.5)
- Uncertainty parameter 0
- Observation arc: 108.29 yr (39553 d)
- Aphelion: 2.8288 AU (423.18 Gm)
- Perihelion: 1.7653 AU (264.09 Gm)
- Semi-major axis: 2.2970 AU (343.63 Gm)
- Eccentricity: 0.23150
- Orbital period (sidereal): 1,271.6 d (3.48 yr)
- Mean anomaly: 51.9052°
- Mean motion: 0° 16^{m} 59.196^{s} / day
- Inclination: 18.125°
- Longitude of ascending node: 278.460°
- Argument of perihelion: 214.008°

Physical characteristics
- Mean diameter: 125.90±4.49 km (composite estimate); 160.736±1.342 km
- Mass: (1.22±0.351)×10^{18} kg (composite estimate) (2.25±0.57)×10^{18} kg (Note: Calculated from its standard gravitational parameter GM = 0.150±0.038 km^{3}/s^{2}.)
- Mean density: 1.17±0.36 g/cm^{3} 1.03 g/cm^{3} (Note: Assuming a diameter of 161 km.)
- Synodic rotation period: 31.735 h (1.3223 d)
- Geometric albedo: 0.027±0.005
- Absolute magnitude (H): 8.60

654 Zelinda is a minor planet orbiting the Sun that was discovered on 4 January 1908 by German astronomer August Kopff. It is orbiting the Sun at a distance of 2.297 AU with an orbital eccentricity of 0.23 and a period of 3.48 yr. The orbital plane is inclined at an angle of 18.1° to the plane of the ecliptic. On favorable oppositions, it can be as bright as magnitude 10.0, as observed on January 30, 2016.

In 1988, this object was detected with radar from the Arecibo Observatory at a distance of 0.89 AU. The measured radar cross-section was 2,200 km^{2}. Measurements made using the adaptive optics system at the W. M. Keck Observatory give a diameter estimate of 131 km. This is 13% smaller than the diameter estimated from the IRAS observatory measurements. It is roughly triangular in shape, and spins with a synodic rotation period of 31.735 h.
