= 669 Kypria =

Main-belt asteroid

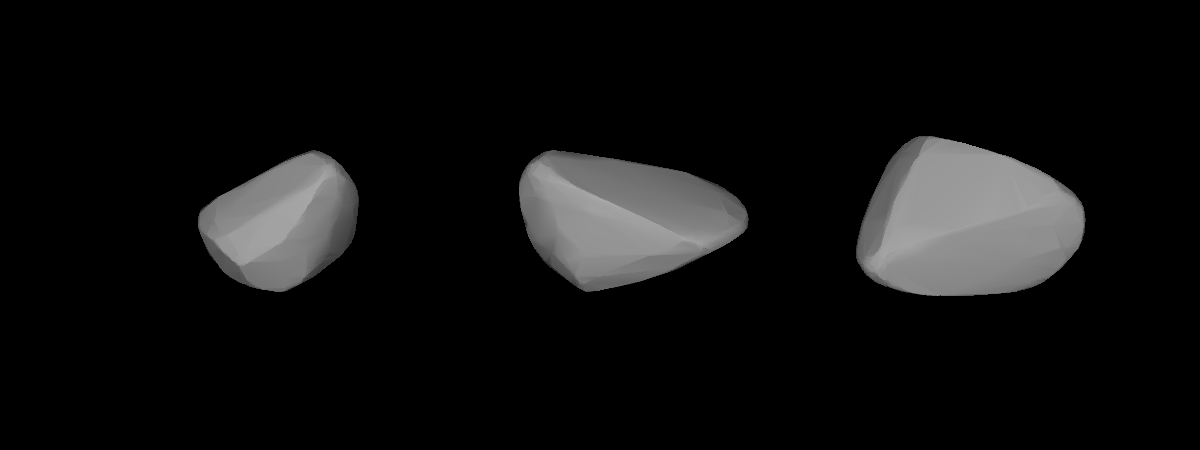
- A three-dimensional model of 669 Kypria based on its light curve

Discovery
- Discovered by: August Kopff
- Discovery site: Heidelberg
- Discovery date: 20 August 1908

Designations
- Pronunciation: /ˈkɪpriə/
- Alternative designations: 1908 DQ

Orbital characteristics
- Epoch 31 July 2016 (JD 2457600.5)
- Uncertainty parameter 0
- Observation arc: 110.22 yr (40258 d)
- Aphelion: 3.2452 AU (485.48 Gm)
- Perihelion: 2.7840 AU (416.48 Gm)
- Semi-major axis: 3.0146 AU (450.98 Gm)
- Eccentricity: 0.076496
- Orbital period (sidereal): 5.23 yr (1911.8 d)
- Mean anomaly: 277.943°
- Mean motion: 0° 11^{m} 17.88^{s} / day
- Inclination: 10.794°
- Longitude of ascending node: 170.761°
- Argument of perihelion: 114.672°

Physical characteristics
- Mean radius: 15.875±0.65 km
- Synodic rotation period: 14.283 h (0.5951 d)
- Geometric albedo: 0.1405±0.012
- Absolute magnitude (H): 10.24

669 Kypria is a minor planet orbiting the Sun that was discovered by German astronomer August Kopff on 20 August 1908. It is named after the lost Greek poem Cypria, which explained the causes of the Trojan War and served as a prequel to the Iliad.

This body is a member of the dynamic Eos family of asteroids that most likely formed as the result of a collisional breakup of a parent body. It is orbiting the Sun with a semimajor axis of 3.01 km and a low eccentricity of 0.076, causing it to vary in distance from 2.78 to 3.25 AU during each orbital period of 5.23 years. The orbital plane is inclined at an angle of 10.79° relative to the plane of the ecliptic.

669 Kypria is classified as a stony S-type asteroid. infrared data yields a diameter estimate of 29.227±0.405 km. Photometric data collected during 2007 was used to construct a lightcurve of this asteroid. It showed a synodic rotational period of 14.283±0.001 hours with a brightness variation of 0.60 in magnitude.
