= 890 Waltraut =

Asteroid

Discovery
- Discovered by: Max Wolf
- Discovery site: Heidelberg Observatory
- Discovery date: 11 March 1918

Designations
- Minor planet category: main-belt Eos

Orbital characteristics
- Epoch 31 July 2016 (JD 2457600.5)
- Uncertainty parameter 0
- Observation arc: 95.39 yr (34842 days)
- Aphelion: 3.2017 AU (478.97 Gm)
- Perihelion: 2.8415 AU (425.08 Gm)
- Semi-major axis: 3.0216 AU (452.02 Gm)
- Eccentricity: 0.059606
- Orbital period (sidereal): 5.25 yr (1918.5 d)
- Mean anomaly: 174.471°
- Mean motion: 0° 11^{m} 15.54^{s} / day
- Inclination: 10.872°
- Longitude of ascending node: 160.683°
- Argument of perihelion: 90.307°

Physical characteristics
- Mean radius: 13.665±0.85 km
- Synodic rotation period: 12.581 h (0.5242 d)
- Geometric albedo: 0.1153±0.016
- Absolute magnitude (H): 10.78

890 Waltraut is an Eoan asteroid from the outer region of the asteroid belt that was discovered by German astronomer Max Wolf on 11 March 1918. It was named for a character in Richard Wagner's opera, Götterdämmerung (Twilight of the Gods).

This is a member of the dynamic Eos family of asteroids that most likely formed as the result of a collisional breakup of a parent body.
