= 682 Hagar =

Planetoid

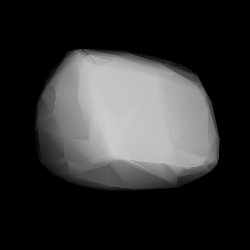
- Modelled shape of Hagar from its lightcurve

Discovery
- Discovered by: A. Kopff
- Discovery site: Heidelberg Obs.
- Discovery date: 17 June 1909

Designations
- Pronunciation: /ˈheɪɡɑːr/
- Named after: Hagar (Biblical woman)
- Alternative designations: A909 MA · 1943 GK; 1953 VU_{3} · 1975 VO_{5} 1909 HA
- Minor planet category: main-belt · (middle); Eunomia

Orbital characteristics
- Epoch 31 May 2020 (JD 2459000.5)
- Uncertainty parameter 0
- Observation arc: 110.96 yr (40,529 d)
- Aphelion: 3.1105 AU
- Perihelion: 2.1966 AU
- Semi-major axis: 2.6536 AU
- Eccentricity: 0.1722
- Orbital period (sidereal): 4.32 yr (1,579 d)
- Mean anomaly: 225.55°
- Mean motion: 0° 13^{m} 40.8^{s} / day
- Inclination: 11.507°
- Longitude of ascending node: 190.78°
- Argument of perihelion: 105.08°

Physical characteristics
- Mean diameter: 19±4 km
- Synodic rotation period: 4.8503±0.0001 h (Note: Lightcurve plot of (682) Hagar, by Frederick Pilcher (2013) at the Organ Mesa Observatory (G50) in Arizona. Rotation period 4.8503±0.0001 hours with a brightness amplitude of 0.52±0.03 mag. Quality code is 3. Summary figures at the LCDB and ASLC website.)
- Pole ecliptic latitude: (56.0°, −78.0°) (λ_{1}/β_{1}); (255.0°, −57.0°) (λ_{2}/β_{2})
- Geometric albedo: 0.057 (assumed)
- Spectral type: S (assumed); C (assumed); V–R = 0.400±0.040
- Absolute magnitude (H): 12.2; 12.27±0.07

682 Hagar (prov. designation: A909 MA or 1909 HA) is an Eunomia asteroid from the central regions of the asteroid belt. It was discovered on 17 June 1909, by German astronomer August Kopff at the Heidelberg-Königstuhl State Observatory. The presumed S-type asteroid has a short rotation period of 4.9 hours and measures approximately 19 kilometers (12 miles) in diameter. Possibly inspired by the asteroid's provisional designation "1909 HA", it was named for the biblical woman Hagar.

== Orbit and classification ==
When applying the hierarchical clustering method to its proper orbital elements, Hagar is a core member of the Eunomia family (502), a prominent family of stony S-type asteroids and the largest one in the intermediate main belt with more than 5,000 known members. It orbits the Sun in the central main-belt at a distance of 2.2–3.1 AU once every 4 years and 4 months (1,579 days; semi-major axis of 2.65 AU). Its orbit has an eccentricity of 0.17 and an inclination of 12° with respect to the ecliptic. The body's observation arc begins at Vienna Observatory on 28 June 1909, just eleven nights after prior to its official discovery observation by August Kopff at Heidelberg.

== Naming ==
This minor planet was named after the biblical woman Hagar from the Book of Genesis. She was an Ancient Egyptian servant of Sarah and the mother of Abraham's firstborn, Ishmael. The asteroid's name may have been inspired by the two letters of its provisional designation, "1909 HA". It is also speculated that the name comes from a list created in 1913 by the Astronomisches Rechen-Institut (ARI) containing suggestions of female names from history and mythology for the naming of minor planets (AN 196, 137). At the time, the naming process was not well developed and the ARI feared inconsistencies and potential confusion. The list was sent to several German astronomers, including Kopff, with the invitation to name all of their made discoveries up to number 700.

== Physical characteristics ==
Based on the overall spectral type of the Eunomia family, Hagar is possibly a common, stony S-type asteroid. However, observations by Pilcher (see below) found a V–R color index of 0.400±0.040, which rather suggest a low albedo of a carbonaceous C-type asteroid.

=== Rotation period ===
In August 2013, a rotational lightcurve of Hagar was obtained from nine nights of photometric observations by Frederick Pilcher at the Organ Mesa Observatory (G50) in Arizona. Analysis gave a well-defined, classically shaped bimodal lightcurve with a rotation period of (4.8503±0.0001) hours and a high brightness variation of 0.52±0.03 magnitude (U=3). At the same time, Alexander Kurtenkov at Sofia University, and a team of Bulgarian students obtained a concurring period of 4.854±0.011 hours with an amplitude of 0.49±0.03 magnitude (U=3). In July 2017, French and Swiss astronomers René Roy and Raoul Behrend confirmed the period measuring a nearly identical rotation of (4.8516±0.0003) hours and an amplitude of 0.51±0.02 magnitude (U=3).

=== Poles ===
Two lightcurves, published in 2016, using modeled photometric data from the Lowell Photometric Database (LPD) and other sources, gave a concurring sidereal period of (4.850417±0.000001) and (4.85042±0.00005) hours, respectively. Each modeled lightcurve also determined two spin axes of (93.0°, −71.0°) and (277.0°, −35.0°), as well as (56.0°, −78.0°) and (255.0°, −57.0°) in ecliptic coordinates (λ, β), respectively.

=== Diameter and albedo ===
American photometrist Frederick Pilcher also determined a diameter of 19±4 kilometers based on a visual absolute magnitude of 12.27±0.07, and an albedo of 0.057 derived from its measured V–R color index (see above). The Collaborative Asteroid Lightcurve Link adopts Pilcher's albedo of 0.057 and derives a diameter of 19.57 kilometers.
