= 616 Elly =

Main-belt asteroid

Discovery
- Discovered by: August Kopff
- Discovery site: Heidelberg
- Discovery date: 17 October 1906

Designations
- Alternative designations: 1906 VT

Orbital characteristics
- Epoch 31 July 2016 (JD 2457600.5)
- Uncertainty parameter 0
- Observation arc: 109.51 yr (39998 d)
- Aphelion: 2.7045 AU (404.59 Gm)
- Perihelion: 2.4026 AU (359.42 Gm)
- Semi-major axis: 2.5536 AU (382.01 Gm)
- Eccentricity: 0.059122
- Orbital period (sidereal): 4.08 yr (1490.4 d)
- Mean anomaly: 258.42°
- Mean motion: 0° 14^{m} 29.544^{s} / day
- Inclination: 14.960°
- Longitude of ascending node: 356.112°
- Argument of perihelion: 107.703°

Physical characteristics
- Mean radius: 9.075±0.75 km
- Synodic rotation period: 5.301 ± 0.001 h 5.297 h (0.2207 d)
- Geometric albedo: 0.2866±0.053
- Absolute magnitude (H): 10.68

616 Elly is a minor planet orbiting the Sun. It is a member of the Maria family of asteroids.
