= 663 Gerlinde =

Main-belt asteroid

Discovery
- Discovered by: August Kopff
- Discovery site: Heidelberg
- Discovery date: 24 June 1908

Designations
- Alternative designations: 1908 DG

Orbital characteristics
- Epoch 31 July 2016 (JD 2457600.5)
- Uncertainty parameter 0
- Observation arc: 107.39 yr (39224 d)
- Aphelion: 3.5174 AU (526.20 Gm)
- Perihelion: 2.6209 AU (392.08 Gm)
- Semi-major axis: 3.0691 AU (459.13 Gm)
- Eccentricity: 0.14605
- Orbital period (sidereal): 5.38 yr (1963.9 d)
- Mean anomaly: 135.977°
- Mean motion: 0° 10^{m} 59.916^{s} / day
- Inclination: 17.820°
- Longitude of ascending node: 232.869°
- Argument of perihelion: 310.954°

Physical characteristics
- Mean radius: 50.44±1.5 km
- Mass: (7.5±7.5)×10^{17} kg (Note: Calculated from its standard gravitational parameter GM = 0.05±0.05 km^{3}/s^{2}.) (SB441)
- Mean density: 1.4±1.4 g/cm^{3} (calculated)
- Synodic rotation period: 10.251 h (0.4271 d)
- Geometric albedo: 0.0359±0.002
- Absolute magnitude (H): 9.21

663 Gerlinde is a minor planet orbiting the Sun.
