= 613 Ginevra =

Main-belt asteroid

Discovery
- Discovered by: August Kopff
- Discovery site: Heidelberg
- Discovery date: 11 October 1906

Designations
- Pronunciation: Italian: [dʒiˈneːvra]
- Named after: Guinevere
- Alternative designations: 1906 VP

Orbital characteristics
- Epoch 31 July 2016 (JD 2457600.5)
- Uncertainty parameter 0
- Observation arc: 114.18 yr (41704 d)
- Aphelion: 3.0931 AU (462.72 Gm)
- Perihelion: 2.7483 AU (411.14 Gm)
- Semi-major axis: 2.9207 AU (436.93 Gm)
- Eccentricity: 0.059028
- Orbital period (sidereal): 4.99 yr (1823.2 d)
- Mean anomaly: 334.658°
- Mean motion: 0° 11^{m} 50.82^{s} / day
- Inclination: 7.6668°
- Longitude of ascending node: 354.807°
- Argument of perihelion: 62.394°

Physical characteristics
- Mean radius: 40.02±1 km
- Synodic rotation period: 13.024 h (0.5427 d)
- Geometric albedo: 0.0374±0.002
- Absolute magnitude (H): 9.67

613 Ginevra is a mid-sized asteroid orbiting the Sun.
