= 679 Pax =

Main-belt asteroid

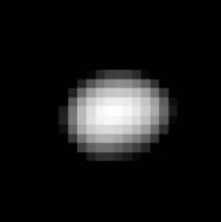
- An image of 679 Pax.

Discovery
- Discovered by: August Kopff
- Discovery site: Heidelberg
- Discovery date: 28 January 1909

Designations
- Pronunciation: /ˈpæks/
- Alternative designations: 1909 FY

Orbital characteristics
- Epoch 31 July 2016 (JD 2457600.5)
- Uncertainty parameter 0
- Observation arc: 106.90 yr (39044 d)
- Aphelion: 3.3910 AU (507.29 Gm)
- Perihelion: 1.7808 AU (266.40 Gm)
- Semi-major axis: 2.5859 AU (386.85 Gm)
- Eccentricity: 0.31135
- Orbital period (sidereal): 4.16 yr (1518.8 d)
- Mean anomaly: 33.4022°
- Mean motion: 0° 14^{m} 13.272^{s} / day
- Inclination: 24.387°
- Longitude of ascending node: 112.263°
- Argument of perihelion: 266.736°

Physical characteristics
- Mean radius: 25.735±1.2 km 32.44 ± 1.82 km
- Mass: (7.14 ± 1.99) × 10^{17} kg
- Mean density: 4.99 ± 1.62 g/cm^{3}
- Synodic rotation period: 8.452 h (0.3522 d)
- Geometric albedo: 0.1660±0.017
- Absolute magnitude (H): 9.01

679 Pax is a minor planet orbiting the Sun that was discovered by German astronomer August Kopff on January 28, 1909. It is named after Pax, a Roman goddess. It is orbiting the Sun with a period of 4.16 years, a semimajor axis of 2.59 AU, and a moderately high eccentricity of 0.31. The last causes it to vary in distance from the Sun over the course of its orbit, ranging from 1.78 to 3.39 AU. The orbital plane is inclined at an angle of 24.4° relative to the plane of the ecliptic.

Measurements using the adaptive optics at the W. M. Keck Observatory give a mean diameter of 62 km. This is 16% larger than the diameter estimated using the IRAS observatory. The asteroid is elongated with a size ratio of 1.66 ± 0.23 between the major and minor axes. Photometric measurements reported in 1982 gave a rotation period of 8.452 hours. The asteroid's pole of rotation lies 32° away from the plane of the ecliptic.

Polarimetric study of this asteroid reveals anomalous properties that suggests the regolith consists of a mixture of low and high albedo material. This may have been caused by fragmentation of an asteroid substrate with the spectral properties of CO3/CV3 carbonaceous chondrites.

== See also ==
- 2037 Tripaxeptalis
