= 656 Beagle =

Main-belt asteroid

Discovery
- Discovered by: A. Kopff
- Discovery site: Heidelberg Obs.
- Discovery date: 22 January 1908

Designations
- Pronunciation: /ˈbiːɡəl/
- Named after: HMS Beagle (Darwin's ship)
- Alternative designations: 1908 BU · 1917 Sed; 1954 HJ
- Minor planet category: main-belt · (outer); Themis · Beagle

Orbital characteristics
- Epoch 23 March 2018 (JD 2458200.5)
- Uncertainty parameter 0
- Observation arc: 109.90 yr (40,141 d)
- Aphelion: 3.5722 AU
- Perihelion: 2.7270 AU
- Semi-major axis: 3.1496 AU
- Eccentricity: 0.1342
- Orbital period (sidereal): 5.59 yr (2,042 d)
- Mean anomaly: 201.29°
- Mean motion: 0° 10^{m} 34.68^{s} / day
- Inclination: 0.5165°
- Longitude of ascending node: 184.28°
- Argument of perihelion: 330.81°

Physical characteristics
- Mean diameter: 62.60±0.51 km
- Synodic rotation period: 7.035±0.003 h
- Geometric albedo: 0.045±0.005
- Spectral type: C (SDSS-MOC)
- Absolute magnitude (H): 10.00

656 Beagle, provisional designation 1908 BU, is an asteroid from the outer regions of the asteroid belt, approximately 60 kilometers (37 miles) in diameter. It was discovered on 22 January 1908, by German astronomer August Kopff at the Heidelberg Observatory. It is the principal body and namesake of the small Beagle cluster located within the Themis family. The C-type asteroid is likely highly elongated and has a rotation period of 7.0 hours. It was named for Charles Darwin's ship, HMS Beagle.

== Orbit and classification ==
Beagle is the principal body and namesake of the Beagle cluster (620), a small asteroid family of less than 150 known members, located within the much larger Themis family (602) of carbonaceous asteroids, which is named after 24 Themis. It orbits the Sun in the outer main-belt at a distance of 2.7–3.6 AU once every 5 years and 7 months (2,042 days; semi-major axis of 3.15 AU). Its orbit has an eccentricity of 0.13 and an inclination of 1° with respect to the ecliptic.

== Naming ==
This minor planet was named after HMS Beagle, with which naturalist Charles Darwin sailed around the world from 1831 to 1836. The official naming citation was mentioned in The Names of the Minor Planets by Paul Herget in 1955 (H 68).

== Physical characteristics ==
In the SDSS-based taxonomy, Beagle is a carbonaceous C-type asteroid, in line with the overall spectral type of the Beagle and Themis family.

=== Rotation period ===
In April 2004, a rotational lightcurve of Beagle was obtained from photometric observations by John Menke at the Menke Observatory. Lightcurve analysis gave a rotation period of 7.035±0.003 hours with a very high brightness amplitude of 1.2 magnitude, indicative of a non-spherical, elongated shape (U=3).

=== Diameter and albedo ===
According to the survey carried out by the NEOWISE mission of NASA's Wide-field Infrared Survey Explorer, Beagle measures 62.6 kilometers in diameter and its surface has an albedo of 0.045. The Collaborative Asteroid Lightcurve Link adopts the SIMPS albedo of 0.0625 and a diameter of 53.17 kilometers based on an absolute magnitude of 10.0.
