= 650 Amalasuntha =

Main-belt asteroid

Discovery
- Discovered by: August Kopff
- Discovery site: Heidelberg
- Discovery date: 4 October 1907

Designations
- Alternative designations: 1907 AM

Orbital characteristics
- Epoch 31 July 2016 (JD 2457600.5)
- Uncertainty parameter 0
- Observation arc: 108.51 yr (39635 d)
- Aphelion: 2.9093 AU (435.23 Gm)
- Perihelion: 2.0076 AU (300.33 Gm)
- Semi-major axis: 2.4584 AU (367.77 Gm)
- Eccentricity: 0.18339
- Orbital period (sidereal): 3.85 yr (1408.0 d)
- Mean anomaly: 84.6795°
- Mean motion: 0° 15^{m} 20.484^{s} / day
- Inclination: 2.5576°
- Longitude of ascending node: 215.571°
- Argument of perihelion: 178.366°

Physical characteristics
- Synodic rotation period: 16.582 h (0.6909 d)
- Absolute magnitude (H): 12.93

650 Amalasuntha is a minor planet orbiting the Sun that was discovered by German astronomer August Kopff on October 4, 1907, at Heidelberg. It was named after Amalasuntha, the queen of the Ostrogoths from 526 to 534 AD. The name may have been inspired by the asteroid's provisional designation 1907 AM.

Photometric observations of this asteroid during 2007 at the Organ Mesa Observatory in Las Cruces, New Mexico, were used to create a light curve plot. This showed a rotation period of 16.582 ± 0.001 hours and a brightness variation of 0.44 ± 0.03 magnitude during each cycle.
