= 1781 Van Biesbroeck =

Vesta asteroid

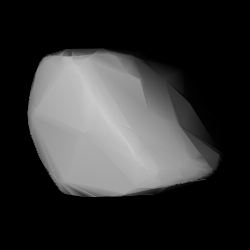
- Van Biesbroeck modeled from its lightcurve

Discovery
- Discovered by: A. Kopff
- Discovery site: Heidelberg Obs.
- Discovery date: 17 October 1906

Designations
- Named after: George Van Biesbroeck (astronomer)
- Alternative designations: A906 UB · 1954 SZ; 1958 VP · 1969 TM_{2}
- Minor planet category: main-belt · Vestian

Orbital characteristics
- Epoch 4 September 2017 (JD 2458000.5)
- Uncertainty parameter 0
- Observation arc: 110.55 yr (40,377 days)
- Aphelion: 2.6541 AU
- Perihelion: 2.1355 AU
- Semi-major axis: 2.3948 AU
- Eccentricity: 0.1083
- Orbital period (sidereal): 3.71 yr (1,354 days)
- Mean anomaly: 330.79°
- Mean motion: 0° 15^{m} 57.24^{s} / day
- Inclination: 6.9497°
- Longitude of ascending node: 44.630°
- Argument of perihelion: 342.83°

Physical characteristics
- Dimensions: 8.500±0.126; 9 km (estimate at 0.20)
- Geometric albedo: 0.203±0.023
- Spectral type: XS
- Absolute magnitude (H): 12.75 · 12.8

1781 Van Biesbroeck (prov. designation: A906 UB) is a Vesta asteroid from the inner regions of the asteroid belt, approximately 8.5 kilometers in diameter. It was discovered on 17 October 1906, by German astronomer August Kopff at Heidelberg Observatory in southern Germany. It was named after astronomer George Van Biesbroeck.

== Orbit and classification ==
Van Biesbroeck orbits the Sun in the inner main-belt at a distance of 2.1–2.7 AU once every 3 years and 9 months (1,354 days). Its orbit has an eccentricity of 0.11 and an inclination of 7° with respect to the ecliptic. It is not known whether the member of the Vesta family of asteroids is in fact a V/J-type, or if it is an unrelated interloper, as currently assumed to be more likely. The asteroid's observation arc begins with its official discovery observation, as no precoveries were taken, and no previous identifications were made.

== Physical characteristics ==
According to the survey carried out by NASA's Wide-field Infrared Survey Explorer with its subsequent NEOWISE mission, Van Biesbroeck measures 8.5 kilometers in diameter, and its surface has an albedo of 0.203. A generic absolute magnitude-to-diameter conversion gives an inferred diameter between 8 and 14 kilometers, assuming an albedo in the range of 0.05 to 0.25 for an absolute magnitude of 12.8. As of 2017, Van Biesbroeck's composition, rotation period and shape remain unknown.

== Naming ==
This minor planet was named after renowned Belgian–born observational astronomer George Van Biesbroeck, who naturalized as U.S. citizens in 1922. He specialized in the observation of double stars, variable stars, comets and asteroids, of which he discovered sixteen at the U.S. Yerkes Observatory in Williams Bay, Wisconsin, between 1922 and 1939. The official naming citation was published by the Minor Planet Center on 1 January 1974 (M.P.C. 3569).

In 1961, he published the Van Biesbroeck's star catalog of low-mass, low-luminosity stars. The mountain Van Biesbroeck near the McDonald Observatory, the lunar crater Van Biesbroeck, and most notably the red dwarf Van Biesbroeck's Star, were also named in his honour. (There are very few stars named after people). The George Van Biesbroeck Prize, awarded by the American Astronomical Society for achievements in astronomy, also bears his name.
