= 643 Scheherezade =

Main-belt asteroid

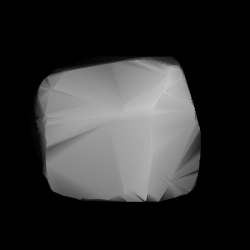
- Modeled shape of Scheherezade

Discovery
- Discovered by: August Kopff
- Discovery site: Heidelberg Obs.
- Discovery date: 8 September 1907

Designations
- Pronunciation: /ʃəˌhɛrəˈzɑːd/
- Named after: Sheherazad
- Alternative designations: 1907 ZZ

Orbital characteristics
- Epoch 31 July 2016 (JD 2457600.5)
- Uncertainty parameter 0
- Observation arc: 108.57 yr (39655 d)
- Aphelion: 3.5551 AU (531.84 Gm)
- Perihelion: 3.1656 AU (473.57 Gm)
- Semi-major axis: 3.3603 AU (502.69 Gm)
- Eccentricity: 0.057954
- Orbital period (sidereal): 6.16 yr (2249.9 d)
- Mean anomaly: 162.557°
- Mean motion: 0° 9^{m} 36.036^{s} / day
- Inclination: 13.769°
- Longitude of ascending node: 252.201°
- Argument of perihelion: 230.826°

Physical characteristics
- Mean radius: 35.785±1.4 km
- Synodic rotation period: 14.161 h (0.5900 d)
- Geometric albedo: 0.0446±0.004
- Absolute magnitude (H): 9.7

643 Scheherezade is a minor planet orbiting the Sun. It was named after the fictional storyteller Sheherazad.
