= 562 Salome =

Asteroid

Discovery
- Discovered by: M. F. Wolf
- Discovery site: Heidelberg
- Discovery date: 3 April 1905

Designations
- Pronunciation: /səˈloʊmiː/ (biblical) /ˈsæləmeɪ/ (operatic)
- Alternative designations: 1905 QH

Orbital characteristics
- Epoch 31 July 2016 (JD 2457600.5)
- Uncertainty parameter 0
- Observation arc: 111.00 yr (40542 d)
- Aphelion: 3.3215 AU (496.89 Gm)
- Perihelion: 2.7152 AU (406.19 Gm)
- Semi-major axis: 3.0183 AU (451.53 Gm)
- Eccentricity: 0.10043
- Orbital period (sidereal): 5.24 yr (1915.3 d)
- Mean anomaly: 313.859°
- Mean motion: 0° 11^{m} 16.656^{s} / day
- Inclination: 11.104°
- Longitude of ascending node: 70.608°
- Argument of perihelion: 263.747°

Physical characteristics
- Mean radius: 15.335±0.9 km
- Synodic rotation period: 6.351 h (0.2646 d)
- Geometric albedo: 0.1967±0.026
- Absolute magnitude (H): 9.95

562 Salome is a minor planet orbiting the Sun that was discovered by German astronomer Max Wolf on 3 April 1905 from Heidelberg. It is named after Salome, the daughter of Herodias who is referenced in the New Testament.

This is a member of the dynamic Eos family of asteroids that most likely formed as the result of a collisional breakup of a parent body.
