= 798 Ruth =

Main-belt asteroid

Discovery
- Discovered by: Max Wolf
- Discovery site: Heidelberg Observatory
- Discovery date: 21 November 1914

Designations
- Pronunciation: /ˈruːθ/
- Alternative designations: 1914 VT

Orbital characteristics
- Epoch 31 July 2016 (JD 2457600.5)
- Uncertainty parameter 0
- Observation arc: 135.93 yr (49647 d)
- Aphelion: 3.1230 AU (467.19 Gm)
- Perihelion: 2.9062 AU (434.76 Gm)
- Semi-major axis: 3.0146 AU (450.98 Gm)
- Eccentricity: 0.035951
- Orbital period (sidereal): 5.23 yr (1,911.7 d)
- Mean anomaly: 327.100°
- Mean motion: 0° 11^{m} 17.88^{s} / day
- Inclination: 9.2386°
- Longitude of ascending node: 214.268°
- Argument of perihelion: 41.817°

Physical characteristics
- Mean radius: 21.595±1.45 km
- Mass: (8.4±3.3)×10^{17} kg (Note: Calculated from its standard gravitational parameter GM = 0.056±0.022 km^{3}/s^{2}.)
- Mean density: 19.89 g/cm^{3} (Note: Assuming a diameter of 43.2 km.)
- Synodic rotation period: 8.550 h (0.3563 d)
- Geometric albedo: 0.1587±0.024
- Spectral type: M
- Absolute magnitude (H): 9.5

798 Ruth is a minor planet orbiting the Sun that was discovered by the German astronomer Max Wolf on 21 November 1914. It may have been named after the biblical character Ruth. This main belt asteroid has an orbital period of 5.23 years and is orbiting at a distance of 3.0 AU from the Sun with an eccentricity (ovalness) of 0.036. The orbital plane is tilted by 9.2° from the plane of the ecliptic.

This is a member of the dynamic Eos family of asteroids that most likely formed as the result of a collisional breakup of a parent body. It is an M-type (metallic) asteroid that displays a significant component of the mineral olivine in its spectrum. 798 Ruth spans 43.19±2.9 km and rotates on its axis once every 8.55 h.
