= 667 Denise =

Main-belt asteroid

Discovery
- Discovered by: August Kopff
- Discovery site: Heidelberg
- Discovery date: 23 July 1908

Designations
- Alternative designations: 1908 DN

Orbital characteristics
- Epoch 31 July 2016 (JD 2457600.5)
- Uncertainty parameter 0
- Observation arc: 107.73 yr (39350 d)
- Aphelion: 3.7913 AU (567.17 Gm)
- Perihelion: 2.5749 AU (385.20 Gm)
- Semi-major axis: 3.1831 AU (476.18 Gm)
- Eccentricity: 0.19107
- Orbital period (sidereal): 5.68 yr (2074.3 d)
- Mean anomaly: 205.803°
- Mean motion: 0° 10^{m} 24.816^{s} / day
- Inclination: 25.404°
- Longitude of ascending node: 153.256°
- Argument of perihelion: 305.863°
- Earth MOID: 1.66044 AU (248.398 Gm)
- Jupiter MOID: 1.53232 AU (229.232 Gm)
- T_{Jupiter}: 3.022

Physical characteristics
- Mean diameter: 83+4 −2 km/83 ± 2 km
- Mass: (6.0±6.0)×10^{17} kg (Note: Calculated from its standard gravitational parameter GM = 0.04±0.04 km^{3}/s^{2}.) (SB441)
- Mean density: 2.0±2.0 g/cm^{3} (calculated)
- Synodic rotation period: 12.68499±0.00003 h
- Pole ecliptic longitude: 15° ± 25°
- Pole ecliptic latitude: −83° ± 6°
- Geometric albedo: 0.051 ± 3
- Absolute magnitude (H): 9.4

667 Denise is a minor planet orbiting the Sun. The name may have been inspired by the asteroid's provisional designation 1908 DN.
