= 593 Titania =

Main-belt asteroid

Discovery
- Discovered by: August Kopff
- Discovery site: Heidelberg
- Discovery date: 20 March 1906

Designations
- Pronunciation: /taɪˈteɪniə/
- Alternative designations: 1906 TT

Orbital characteristics
- Epoch 31 July 2016 (JD 2457600.5)
- Uncertainty parameter 0
- Observation arc: 109.99 yr (40173 d)
- Aphelion: 3.2796 AU (490.62 Gm)
- Perihelion: 2.1201 AU (317.16 Gm)
- Semi-major axis: 2.6998 AU (403.88 Gm)
- Eccentricity: 0.21475
- Orbital period (sidereal): 4.44 yr (1620.3 d)
- Mean anomaly: 6.54586°
- Mean motion: 0° 13^{m} 19.848^{s} / day
- Inclination: 16.884°
- Longitude of ascending node: 75.995°
- Argument of perihelion: 31.131°

Physical characteristics
- Mean radius: 37.66±2.5 km
- Synodic rotation period: 9.89 h (0.412 d)
- Geometric albedo: 0.0604±0.009
- Absolute magnitude (H): 9.28

593 Titania is a minor planet orbiting the Sun. The name may have been inspired by the asteroid's provisional designation 1906 TT.
