= 3687 Dzus =

Carbonaceous asteroid

Discovery
- Discovered by: A. Kopff
- Discovery site: Heidelberg Obs.
- Discovery date: 7 October 1908

Designations
- Named after: Paul K. Dzus (MPC volunteer)
- Alternative designations: A908 TC · 1952 HM_{3} 1970 GD_{2} · 1980 TO_{8} 1980 TX · 1984 NC
- Minor planet category: main-belt · (middle)

Orbital characteristics
- Epoch 4 September 2017 (JD 2458000.5)
- Uncertainty parameter 0
- Observation arc: 108.33 yr (39,567 days)
- Aphelion: 3.2735 AU
- Perihelion: 2.1814 AU
- Semi-major axis: 2.7275 AU
- Eccentricity: 0.2002
- Orbital period (sidereal): 4.50 yr (1,645 days)
- Mean anomaly: 84.307°
- Mean motion: 0° 13^{m} 7.68^{s} / day
- Inclination: 15.798°
- Longitude of ascending node: 224.89°
- Argument of perihelion: 113.79°

Physical characteristics
- Dimensions: 28.61±2.2 km 30.932±0.250 km 32.36±0.40 km 34.481±0.343 km
- Synodic rotation period: 7.44±0.01 h
- Geometric albedo: 0.0373±0.0070; 0.043±0.001; 0.046±0.005; 0.0542±0.009
- Spectral type: SMASS = Ch · C
- Absolute magnitude (H): 11.4 · 11.5 · 11.57±0.19

3687 Dzus, provisional designation A908 TC, is a carbonaceous asteroid from the central region of the asteroid belt, approximately 31 kilometers in diameter. It was discovered by German astronomer August Kopff at Heidelberg-Königstuhl State Observatory on 7 October 1908.

== Orbit and classification ==
Dzus orbits the Sun in the central main-belt at a distance of 2.2–3.3 AU once every 4 years and 6 months (1,645 days). Its orbit has an eccentricity of 0.20 and an inclination of 16° with respect to the ecliptic. As no precoveries were taken, the asteroid's observation arc begins with its discovery observation in 1908.

== Physical characteristics ==
The C-type asteroid is characterized as a Ch subtype in the SMASS classification.

=== Diameter and albedo ===
According to the surveys carried out by the Infrared Astronomical Satellite IRAS, the Japanese Akari satellite, and NASA's Wide-field Infrared Survey Explorer with its subsequent NEOWISE mission, Dzus measures between 28.6 and 34.5 kilometers in diameter and its surface has an albedo between 0.038 and 0.054. The Collaborative Asteroid Lightcurve Link agrees with the results obtained by IRAS; that is an albedo of 0.038 and a diameter of 28.6 kilometers, based on an absolute magnitude of 11.5.

=== Rotation period ===
A fragmentary lightcurve of Dzus was obtained from photometric observations made by Robert Stephens at the Santana Observatory (646) in Rancho Cucamonga, California, during April to June 2002. It showed a rotation period of 7.44±0.01 hours with a brightness variation of 0.25±0.04 in magnitude during each rotation (U=1).

== Naming ==
This minor planet was named by Brian Geoffrey Marsden, long-time director of the Minor Planet Center (MPC), in honor of Paul K. Dzus (b. 1969) in appreciation of his helpful assistance since October 1987, much of the time as a volunteer. The official naming citation was published by the MPC on 23 December 1988 (M.P.C. 14029).
