= 595 Polyxena =

Main-belt asteroid

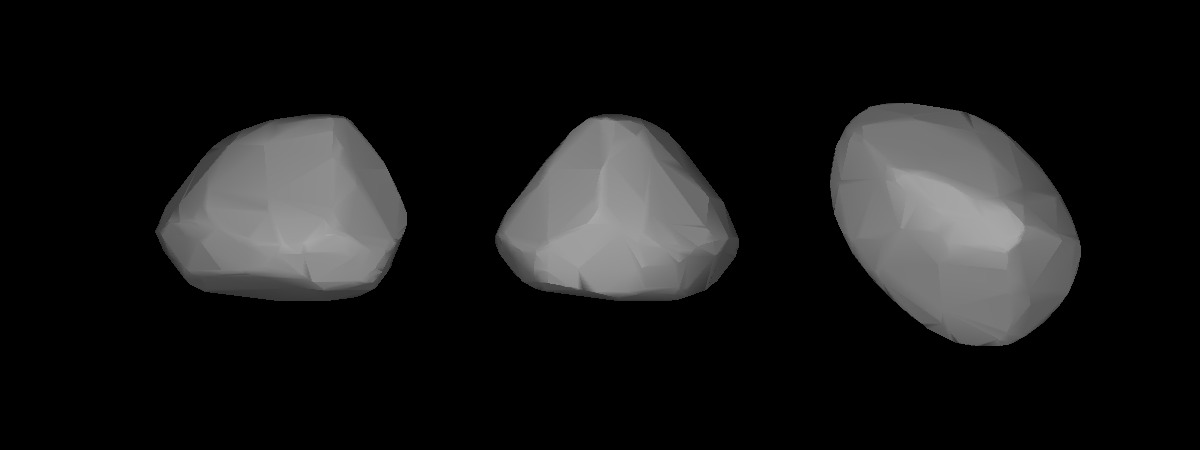
- A three-dimensional model of 595 Polyxena based on its light curve

Discovery
- Discovered by: August Kopff
- Discovery site: Heidelberg
- Discovery date: 27 March 1906

Designations
- Pronunciation: /pɒˈlɪksɪnə/
- Alternative designations: 1906 TZ

Orbital characteristics
- Epoch 31 July 2016 (JD 2457600.5)
- Uncertainty parameter 0
- Observation arc: 110.05 yr (40197 d)
- Aphelion: 3.4085 AU (509.90 Gm)
- Perihelion: 3.0083 AU (450.04 Gm)
- Semi-major axis: 3.2084 AU (479.97 Gm)
- Eccentricity: 0.062376
- Orbital period (sidereal): 5.75 yr (2,099.1 d)
- Mean anomaly: 355.26°
- Mean motion: 0° 10^{m} 17.4^{s} / day
- Inclination: 17.828°
- Longitude of ascending node: 23.909°
- Argument of perihelion: 279.182°

Physical characteristics
- Mean radius: 54.535±1.1 km
- Mass: (1.5±1.5)×10^{18} kg (Note: Calculated from its standard gravitational parameter GM = 0.1±0.1 km^{3}/s^{2}.) (SB441)
- Mean density: 2.2±2.2 g/cm^{3} (calculated)
- Synodic rotation period: 11.801 h (0.4917 d)
- Geometric albedo: 0.0937±0.004
- Absolute magnitude (H): 7.9

595 Polyxena is a minor planet orbiting the Sun. This main belt asteroid was discovered on 27 March 1906 by German astronomer August Kopff at the Heidelberg observatory. It was named after the youngest daughter of Priam and Hecuba, king and queen of Troy during the Trojan War. 595 Polyxena is orbiting at a distance of 3.21 AU from the Sun, with an orbital eccentricity (ovalness) of 0.06 and a period of 5.75 yr (2,099.1 d). The orbital plane is inclined at an angle of 17.8° to the ecliptic.

Light curves generated from photometric data indicate a sidereal rotation period of 11.794162±0.000023 h. Preliminary shape models of the asteroid suggest there's a flat region at the southern pole, perhaps indicating a concave area or an impact crater.
