= 681 Gorgo =

Main-belt asteroid

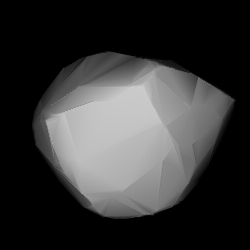
- Modelled shape of Gorgo from its lightcurve

Discovery
- Discovered by: August Kopff
- Discovery site: Heidelberg
- Discovery date: 13 May 1909

Designations
- Pronunciation: /ˈɡɔːrɡoʊ/
- Alternative designations: 1909 GZ

Orbital characteristics
- Epoch 31 July 2016 (JD 2457600.5)
- Uncertainty parameter 0
- Observation arc: 83.58 yr (30526 d)
- Aphelion: 3.4247 AU (512.33 Gm)
- Perihelion: 2.7859 AU (416.76 Gm)
- Semi-major axis: 3.1053 AU (464.55 Gm)
- Eccentricity: 0.10287
- Orbital period (sidereal): 5.47 yr (1998.7 d)
- Mean anomaly: 145.868°
- Mean motion: 0° 10^{m} 48.396^{s} / day
- Inclination: 12.580°
- Longitude of ascending node: 177.985°
- Argument of perihelion: 117.024°

Physical characteristics
- Synodic rotation period: 6.4606 h (0.26919 d)
- Absolute magnitude (H): 10.8

681 Gorgo is a minor planet orbiting the Sun.

'Gorgo' is German for Gorgon. However, Ingrid van Houten-Groeneveld and Antonio Paluzie-Borrell suggest it may refer to "King of Salamine, in the 5th century B.C., who accompanied Xerxes in Greece."
