= 664 Judith =

Main-belt minor planet

Discovery
- Discovered by: August Kopff
- Discovery site: Heidelberg
- Discovery date: 24 June 1908

Designations
- Pronunciation: /ˈdʒuːdɪθ/
- Alternative designations: 1908 DH

Orbital characteristics
- Epoch 31 July 2016 (JD 2457600.5)
- Uncertainty parameter 0
- Observation arc: 107.74 yr (39352 d)
- Aphelion: 3.9310 AU (588.07 Gm)
- Perihelion: 2.4607 AU (368.12 Gm)
- Semi-major axis: 3.1959 AU (478.10 Gm)
- Eccentricity: 0.23004
- Orbital period (sidereal): 5.71 yr (2086.8 d)
- Mean anomaly: 28.142°
- Mean motion: 0° 10^{m} 21.036^{s} / day
- Inclination: 8.5782°
- Longitude of ascending node: 170.956°
- Argument of perihelion: 102.16°

Physical characteristics
- Mean radius: 36.34±1.4 km
- Synodic rotation period: 13.764 h (0.5735 d)
- Geometric albedo: 0.0344±0.003
- Absolute magnitude (H): 9.97

664 Judith is a minor planet orbiting the Sun. It was named after the biblical character Judith.
