= 658 Asteria =

Main-belt asteroid

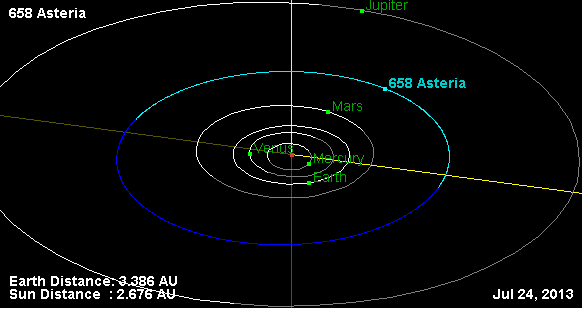

Discovery
- Discovered by: August Kopff
- Discovery site: Heidelberg
- Discovery date: 23 January 1908

Designations
- Pronunciation: /əˈstɪəriə/
- Alternative designations: 1908 BW

Orbital characteristics
- Epoch 31 July 2016 (JD 2457600.5)
- Uncertainty parameter 0
- Observation arc: 109.62 yr (40038 d)
- Aphelion: 3.0400 AU (454.78 Gm)
- Perihelion: 2.6661 AU (398.84 Gm)
- Semi-major axis: 2.8530 AU (426.80 Gm)
- Eccentricity: 0.065512
- Orbital period (sidereal): 4.82 yr (1760.2 d)
- Mean anomaly: 239.630°
- Mean motion: 0° 12^{m} 16.272^{s} / day
- Inclination: 1.5061°
- Longitude of ascending node: 351.004°
- Argument of perihelion: 61.086°

Physical characteristics
- Mean radius: 11.475±0.6 km
- Synodic rotation period: 21.034 h (0.8764 d)
- Geometric albedo: 0.2040±0.024
- Absolute magnitude (H): 10.54

658 Asteria is an asteroid orbiting around the Sun at a distance of around 2.85 AU taking around 4.8 years to complete an orbit. It has a mean radius of about 11.47 kilometers.

== History ==
It was discovered in on the 23rd of January, 1908 by the German astronomer August Kopff in the city Heidelberg. The name appears to have four different meanings in ancient Greek mythology. The first is Asteria the daughter of the Titans Coeus and Phoebe and the sister of Leto. The second is being one of the fifty daughters of Danaus. The third is Apollodorus stating that Asteria was a daughter of Atlas. The fourth and final is Asteria being the name of a town in Greece. The object was lost in 1908.
