= 626 Notburga =

Main-belt asteroid

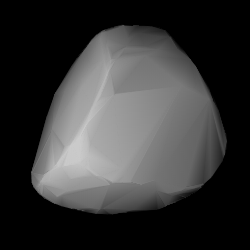
- Modelled shape of Notburga from its lightcurve

Discovery
- Discovered by: August Kopff
- Discovery site: Heidelberg
- Discovery date: 11 February 1907

Designations
- Pronunciation: /nɒtˈbɜːrɡə/
- Named after: Saint Notburga
- Alternative designations: 1907 XO

Orbital characteristics
- Epoch 31 July 2016 (JD 2457600.5)
- Uncertainty parameter 0
- Observation arc: 109.14 yr (39863 d)
- Aphelion: 3.1985 AU (478.49 Gm)
- Perihelion: 1.9481 AU (291.43 Gm)
- Semi-major axis: 2.5733 AU (384.96 Gm)
- Eccentricity: 0.24295
- Orbital period (sidereal): 4.13 yr (1507.8 d)
- Mean anomaly: 277.12°
- Mean motion: 0° 14^{m} 19.536^{s} / day
- Inclination: 25.371°
- Longitude of ascending node: 341.645°
- Argument of perihelion: 43.678°

Physical characteristics
- Mean radius: 48.42 ± 2.335 km (composite estimate); 50.365±1 km
- Mass: (1.0±1.0)×10^{18} kg (Note: Calculated from its standard gravitational parameter GM = 0.07±0.07 km^{3}/s^{2}.) (SB441) (3.24 ± 1.30) × 10^{18} kg
- Mean density: 2.0–2.2 g/cm^{3} (calculated); 6.81 ± 2.90 g/cm^{3}
- Synodic rotation period: 19.353 h (0.8064 d)
- Geometric albedo: 0.0437±0.002
- Absolute magnitude (H): 9.00

626 Notburga is a large, dark asteroid orbiting the Sun in the asteroid belt.
