= 629 Bernardina =

Main-belt asteroid

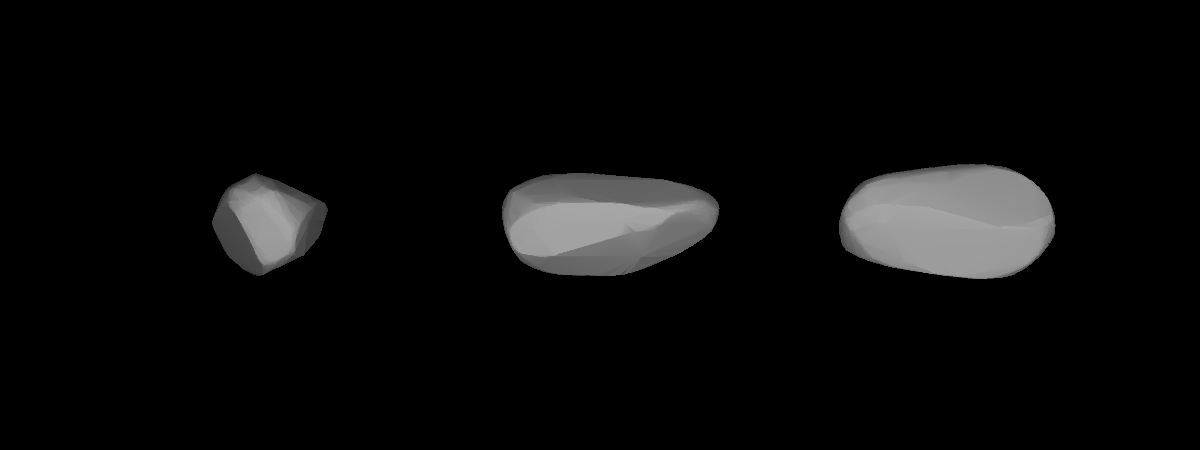
- A three-dimensional model of 629 Bernardina based on its light curve

Discovery
- Discovered by: August Kopff
- Discovery site: Heidelberg
- Discovery date: 7 March 1907

Designations
- Alternative designations: 1907 XU

Orbital characteristics
- Epoch 31 July 2016 (JD 2457600.5)
- Uncertainty parameter 0
- Observation arc: 108.85 yr (39758 d)
- Aphelion: 3.6208 AU (541.66 Gm)
- Perihelion: 2.6560 AU (397.33 Gm)
- Semi-major axis: 3.1384 AU (469.50 Gm)
- Eccentricity: 0.15371
- Orbital period (sidereal): 5.56 yr (2030.8 d)
- Mean anomaly: 292.348°
- Mean motion: 0° 10^{m} 38.172^{s} / day
- Inclination: 9.2530°
- Longitude of ascending node: 86.560°
- Argument of perihelion: 35.435°

Physical characteristics
- Dimensions: 35.087±0.507 km
- Mean radius: 15.05 km
- Synodic rotation period: 3.763 h (0.1568 d)
- Sidereal rotation period: 3.763 h
- Geometric albedo: 0.2140±0.034
- Absolute magnitude (H): 10.0

629 Bernardina is a minor planet orbiting the Sun.

Dust activity due to sublimation has been detected on this asteroid, suggesting the presence of water ice in its interior.
