= 684 Hildburg =

Main-belt Asteroid

Discovery
- Discovered by: A. Kopff
- Discovery site: Heidelberg Obs.
- Discovery date: 8 August 1909

Designations
- Named after: unknown
- Alternative designations: A909 PB · 1928 PB; 1938 CT · 1909 HD
- Minor planet category: main-belt · (inner) background

Orbital characteristics
- Epoch 31 May 2020 (JD 2459000.5)
- Uncertainty parameter 0
- Observation arc: 110.43 yr (40,335 d)
- Aphelion: 2.5172 AU
- Perihelion: 2.3461 AU
- Semi-major axis: 2.4317 AU
- Eccentricity: 0.0352
- Orbital period (sidereal): 3.79 yr (1,385 d)
- Mean anomaly: 122.80°
- Mean motion: 0° 15^{m} 35.64^{s} / day
- Inclination: 5.5224°
- Longitude of ascending node: 336.36°
- Argument of perihelion: 290.44°

Physical characteristics
- Mean diameter: 16.28±0.34 km; 19.040±0.188 km
- Synodic rotation period: 15.89±0.01 h
- Geometric albedo: 0.186±0.009; 0.238±0.043
- Spectral type: S; B–V = 0.960±0.020; U–B = 0.500±0.030
- Absolute magnitude (H): 10.8; 10.94; 11.40

684 Hildburg (prov. designation: A909 PB or 1909 HD) is a stony background asteroid from the inner regions of the asteroid belt. It was discovered on 8 August 1909, by German astronomer August Kopff at the Heidelberg-Königstuhl State Observatory in southwest Germany. The S-type asteroid has a rotation period of 15.9 hours and measures approximately 19 kilometers (12 miles) in diameter. Any reference to the origin of the asteroid's name is unknown.

== Orbit and classification ==
Hildburg is a non-family asteroid of the main belt's background population when applying the hierarchical clustering method to its proper orbital elements. It orbits the Sun in the inner main-belt at a distance of 2.3–2.5 AU once every 3 years and 9 months (1,385 days; semi-major axis of 2.43 AU). Its orbit has an eccentricity of 0.04 and an inclination of 6° with respect to the ecliptic. The body's observation arc begins at Heidelberg Observatory on 19 August 1909, just eleven nights after its official discovery observation.

== Naming ==
This minor planet's name may have been inspired by the two letters of its provisional designation, "1909 HD". However, any reference to a person or occurrence is unknown. It is speculated that the name comes from a list created in 1913 by the Astronomisches Rechen-Institut (ARI) containing suggestions of female names from history and mythology for the naming of minor planets (AN 196, 137). At the time, the naming process was not well developed and the ARI feared inconsistencies and potential confusion. The list was sent to several German astronomers, including Kopff, with the invitation to name all of their made discoveries up to number 700. It is therefore unlikely that this asteroid's name refers to a known person such as Austrian actress Stephanie Hildburg (1862–1942).

=== Unknown meaning ===
Among the many thousands of named minor planets, Hildburg is one of 120 asteroids for which no naming citation has been published. All of these asteroids with an unknown meaning have low numbers, beginning with 164 Eva and ending with 1514 Ricouxa, all discovered between 1876 and the 1930s, predominantly by astronomers Auguste Charlois, Johann Palisa, Max Wolf and Karl Reinmuth.

== Physical characteristics ==
Hildburg is a common stony S-type asteroid according to observations by Richard Binzel conducted at McDonald and Cerro Tololo observatories in May 1984.

=== Rotation period ===
In March 2014, a rotational lightcurve of Hildburg was obtained from photometric observations by Italian astronomer Andrea Ferrero at the Bigmuskie Observatory (B88) in Mombercelli, Italy. Lightcurve analysis gave a rotation period of 15.89±0.01 hours with a brightness variation of 0.22±0.02 magnitude (U=2). However, the result is ambiguous and allows for an alternative period solution of 11.92 hours. In April 2008, French amateur astronomer René Roy determined a period of 14.2±1.0 hours with a low amplitude of 0.07±0.02 magnitude (U=2−). In May 1984, the object's first measurement by Richard Binzel gave a period of 11.92 h and an amplitude of 0.23 magnitude (U=2).

=== Diameter and albedo ===
According to the surveys carried out by the Japanese Akari satellite and the NEOWISE mission of NASA's Wide-field Infrared Survey Explorer (WISE), Hildburg measures (16.28±0.34) and (19.040±0.188) kilometers in diameter and its surface has an albedo of (0.186±0.009) and (0.238±0.043), respectively.

The Collaborative Asteroid Lightcurve Link assumes a standard albedo for a stony asteroid of 0.20 and derives a diameter of 19.28 kilometers based on an absolute magnitude of 10.94. The WISE team also published an alternative mean-diameter (22.386±0.080 km) and an albedo of (0.1485±0.0159). On 23 August 2004, an asteroid occultation gave a best-fit ellipse dimension of (17.0 km × 17.0 km) with a low quality rating of 1. These timed observations are taken when the asteroid passes in front of a distant star.
