= 584 Semiramis =

Main-belt asteroid

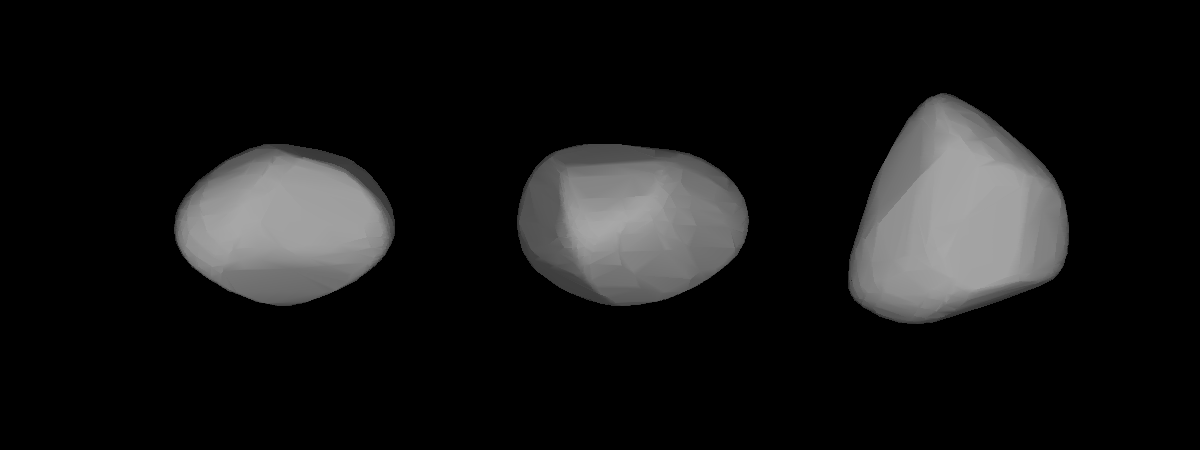
- A three-dimensional model of 584 Semiramis based on its light curve

Discovery
- Discovered by: A. Kopff
- Discovery site: Heidelberg
- Discovery date: 15 January 1906

Designations
- Pronunciation: /sɪˈmɪrəmɪs/
- Named after: Semiramis
- Alternative designations: 1906 SY

Orbital characteristics
- Epoch 31 July 2016 (JD 2457600.5)
- Uncertainty parameter 0
- Observation arc: 110.26 yr (40272 d)
- Aphelion: 2.9282 AU (438.05 Gm)
- Perihelion: 1.8224 AU (272.63 Gm)
- Semi-major axis: 2.3753 AU (355.34 Gm)
- Eccentricity: 0.23276
- Orbital period (sidereal): 3.66 yr (1337.1 d)
- Mean anomaly: 166.35°
- Mean motion: 0° 16^{m} 9.228^{s} / day
- Inclination: 10.718°
- Longitude of ascending node: 282.159°
- Argument of perihelion: 85.121°

Physical characteristics
- Mean radius: 27.005±0.7 km 25.89 ± 1.075 km
- Mass: (8.23 ± 5.77) × 10^{17} kg
- Synodic rotation period: 5.068 h (0.2112 d)
- Geometric albedo: 0.1987±0.011
- Absolute magnitude (H): 8.71

584 Semiramis is a minor planet orbiting the Sun within the main asteroid belt. Photometric observations at the Mark Evans Observatory during 2014 gave a rotation period of 5.0689 ± 0.0001 hours. This value is in close agreement with previous studies. The spectrum shows it to be a stony S(IV)-type asteroid.
