= 585 Bilkis =

Minor planet (asteroid)

Discovery
- Discovered by: A. Kopff
- Discovery site: Heidelberg
- Discovery date: 16 February 1906

Designations
- Pronunciation: /ˈbɪlkɪs/
- Alternative designations: 1906 TA

Orbital characteristics
- Epoch 31 July 2016 (JD 2457600.5)
- Uncertainty parameter 0
- Observation arc: 110.16 yr (40236 d)
- Aphelion: 2.7440 AU (410.50 Gm)
- Perihelion: 2.1173 AU (316.74 Gm)
- Semi-major axis: 2.4307 AU (363.63 Gm)
- Eccentricity: 0.12892
- Orbital period (sidereal): 3.79 yr (1384.2 d)
- Mean anomaly: 60.5077°
- Mean motion: 0° 15^{m} 36.288^{s} / day
- Inclination: 7.5679°
- Longitude of ascending node: 180.293°
- Argument of perihelion: 328.948°

Physical characteristics
- Mean radius: 29.045±0.65 km
- Synodic rotation period: 8.5751 h (0.35730 d)
- Geometric albedo: 0.0362±0.002
- Absolute magnitude (H): 10.40

585 Bilkis is a minor planet, specifically an asteroid orbiting in the asteroid belt. It was discovered by German astronomer August Kopff in 1906 February and was given the Koran name for the Queen of Sheba. Photometric observations at the Palmer Divide Observatory in Colorado Springs, Colorado in 2006–7 were used to build a light curve for this object. The asteroid displayed a rotation period of 8.5742 ± 0.0005 hours and a brightness variation of 0.40 ± 0.02 in magnitude.
