= 680 Genoveva =

Main-belt asteroid

Discovery
- Discovered by: August Kopff
- Discovery site: Heidelberg
- Discovery date: 22 April 1909

Designations
- Alternative designations: 1909 GW

Orbital characteristics
- Epoch 31 July 2016 (JD 2457600.5)
- Uncertainty parameter 0
- Observation arc: 106.97 yr (39070 d)
- Aphelion: 4.0692 AU (608.74 Gm)
- Perihelion: 2.2223 AU (332.45 Gm)
- Semi-major axis: 3.1457 AU (470.59 Gm)
- Eccentricity: 0.29354
- Orbital period (sidereal): 5.58 yr (2037.9 d)
- Mean anomaly: 23.547°
- Mean motion: 0° 10^{m} 35.94^{s} / day
- Inclination: 17.498°
- Longitude of ascending node: 38.042°
- Argument of perihelion: 245.721°

Physical characteristics
- Mean radius: 42.345 ± 0.855 km (composite estimate); 41.96±0.7 km
- Mass: (6.0±6.0)×10^{17} kg (Note: Calculated from its standard gravitational parameter GM = 0.04±0.04 km^{3}/s^{2}.) (SB441)
- Mean density: ~1.9 g/cm^{3} (calculated)
- Synodic rotation period: 11.089 h (0.4620 d)
- Geometric albedo: 0.0474±0.002
- Absolute magnitude (H): 9.31

680 Genoveva is a minor planet orbiting the Sun. It was named after the play Genoveva by Friedrich Hebbel. The name may have been inspired by the asteroid's provisional designation 1909 GW, as W is pronounced 'v' in German, as is V in Latinate names such as 'Genoveva'.
