= 631 Philippina =

Main-belt asteroid

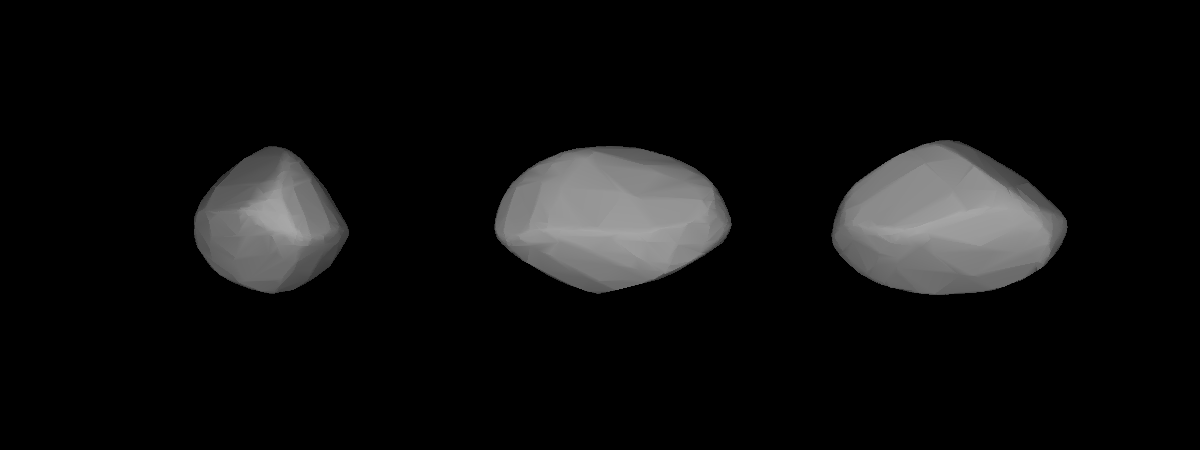
- A three-dimensional model of 631 Philippina based on its light curve

Discovery
- Discovered by: August Kopff
- Discovery site: Heidelberg
- Discovery date: 21 March 1907

Designations
- Alternative designations: 1907 YJ

Orbital characteristics
- Epoch 31 July 2016 (JD 2457600.5)
- Uncertainty parameter 0
- Observation arc: 109.08 yr (39842 d)
- Aphelion: 3.0226 AU (452.17 Gm)
- Perihelion: 2.5641 AU (383.58 Gm)
- Semi-major axis: 2.7933 AU (417.87 Gm)
- Eccentricity: 0.082065
- Orbital period (sidereal): 4.67 yr (1705.2 d)
- Mean anomaly: 217.70°
- Mean motion: 0° 12^{m} 39.996^{s} / day
- Inclination: 18.917°
- Longitude of ascending node: 224.709°
- Argument of perihelion: 277.857°

Physical characteristics
- Mean radius: 28.825±0.6 km
- Synodic rotation period: 5.899 h (0.2458 d)
- Geometric albedo: 0.1760±0.008
- Absolute magnitude (H): 8.70

631 Philippina is a minor planet orbiting the Sun that was discovered by German astronomer August Kopff on March 21, 1907.

Photometric of this asteroid made in 1981 gave a light curve with a period of 5.92 ± 0.01 hours with a brightness variation of 0.20 in magnitude. In 2007 lightcurve data showed that it rotates every 5.899 ± 0.001 hours.

== See also ==
- List of minor planets: 1–1000
