= 672 Astarte =

Main-belt asteroid

Discovery
- Discovered by: August Kopff
- Discovery site: Heidelberg
- Discovery date: 21 September 1908

Designations
- Pronunciation: /əˈstɑːrtiː/
- Alternative designations: 1908 DY

Orbital characteristics
- Epoch 31 July 2016 (JD 2457600.5)
- Uncertainty parameter 0
- Observation arc: 109.04 yr (39826 d)
- Aphelion: 2.9012 AU (434.01 Gm)
- Perihelion: 2.2093 AU (330.51 Gm)
- Semi-major axis: 2.5553 AU (382.27 Gm)
- Eccentricity: 0.13538
- Orbital period (sidereal): 4.08 yr (1492.0 d)
- Mean anomaly: 199.236°
- Mean motion: 0° 14^{m} 28.644^{s} / day
- Inclination: 11.125°
- Longitude of ascending node: 343.936°
- Argument of perihelion: 308.810°

Physical characteristics
- Dimensions: 28.5±1.3 km 32.3±1.0 km
- Synodic rotation period: 22.572 h (0.9405 d)
- Absolute magnitude (H): 11.5

672 Astarte is a minor planet orbiting the Sun.
