= 639 Latona =

Member of the Eos family of asteroids

Discovery
- Discovered by: K. Lohnert
- Discovery site: Heidelberg
- Discovery date: 19 July 1907

Designations
- Pronunciation: /leɪˈtoʊnə/
- Alternative designations: 1907 ZT

Orbital characteristics
- Epoch 31 July 2016 (JD 2457600.5)
- Uncertainty parameter 0
- Observation arc: 108.74 yr (39718 d)
- Aphelion: 3.3364 AU (499.12 Gm)
- Perihelion: 2.6969 AU (403.45 Gm)
- Semi-major axis: 3.0167 AU (451.29 Gm)
- Eccentricity: 0.10600
- Orbital period (sidereal): 5.24 yr (1913.8 d)
- Mean anomaly: 253.886°
- Mean motion: 0° 11^{m} 17.196^{s} / day
- Inclination: 8.5546°
- Longitude of ascending node: 279.853°
- Argument of perihelion: 70.682°

Physical characteristics
- Mean radius: 35.625±0.85 km
- Mass: (7.2±2.1)×10^{17} kg (Note: Calculated from its standard gravitational parameter GM = 0.048±0.014 km^{3}/s^{2}.)
- Mean density: 2.82 g/cm^{3} (Note: Assuming a diameter of 78.5 km.)
- Synodic rotation period: 6.193 h (0.2580 d)
- Geometric albedo: 0.1826±0.009
- Absolute magnitude (H): 8.20

639 Latona is a minor planet, specifically an asteroid orbiting in the asteroid belt. It was discovered by German astronomer Karl Lohnert on 19 July 1907, at Heidelberg.

Photometric observations of this asteroid at Palmer Divide Observatory in Colorado Springs, Colorado, during 2007 gave a light curve with a period of 6.139 ± 0.002 hours and a brightness variation of 0.08 ± 0.01 in magnitude. This confirms period measurements of about 6.2 hours reported in 1987 and 2001.

This is a member of the dynamic Eos family of asteroids that most likely formed as the result of a collisional breakup of a parent body.
