= 805 Hormuthia =

Minor planet

Discovery
- Discovered by: Max Wolf
- Discovery site: Heidelberg Observatory
- Discovery date: 17 April 1915

Designations
- Alternative designations: 1915 WW

Orbital characteristics
- Epoch 31 July 2016 (JD 2457600.5)
- Uncertainty parameter 0
- Observation arc: 100.85 yr (36835 d)
- Aphelion: 3.7899 AU (566.96 Gm)
- Perihelion: 2.5947 AU (388.16 Gm)
- Semi-major axis: 3.1923 AU (477.56 Gm)
- Eccentricity: 0.18720
- Orbital period (sidereal): 5.70 yr (2083.3 d)
- Mean anomaly: 132.402°
- Mean motion: 0° 10^{m} 22.08^{s} / day
- Inclination: 15.728°
- Longitude of ascending node: 166.446°
- Argument of perihelion: 132.362°
- Earth MOID: 1.60843 AU (240.618 Gm)
- Jupiter MOID: 1.7152 AU (256.59 Gm)
- T_{Jupiter}: 3.111

Physical characteristics
- Mean radius: 33.47±1.45 km
- Synodic rotation period: 9.510 h (0.3963 d)
- Geometric albedo: 0.0465±0.004
- Absolute magnitude (H): 9.82

805 Hormuthia is a minor planet orbiting the Sun. This asteroid follows an elliptical orbit through the main asteroid belt that reaches perihelion just outside the Kirkwood gap at 2.5 AU. Its estimated diameter is 73 km, and it is one of the 500 largest asteroids. 805 Hormuthia was discovered by Max Wolf in 1915, at the University of Heidelberg. The planet is named after Hormuth Kopff, the wife of astronomer August Kopff.
