= 657 Gunlöd =

Main-belt asteroid

Discovery
- Discovered by: A. Kopff
- Discovery site: Heidelberg Obs.
- Discovery date: 23 January 1908

Designations
- Alternative designations: 1908 BV; 1927 SC; 1929 AM; 1936 YJ

Orbital characteristics
- Epoch 31 July 2016 (JD 2457600.5)
- Uncertainty parameter 0
- Observation arc: 107.90 yr (39412 d)
- Aphelion: 2.9049 AU (434.57 Gm)
- Perihelion: 2.3187 AU (346.87 Gm)
- Semi-major axis: 2.6118 AU (390.72 Gm)
- Eccentricity: 0.11223
- Orbital period (sidereal): 4.22 yr (1541.7 d)
- Mean anomaly: 207.017°
- Mean motion: 0° 14^{m} 0.636^{s} / day
- Inclination: 10.228°
- Longitude of ascending node: 297.595°
- Argument of perihelion: 245.225°

Physical characteristics
- Mean diameter: 39+2 −1 km 37 ± 3 km (alternate pole solution)
- Synodic rotation period: 15.92870 ± 0.00004 h 15.92872 ± 0.00003 h (alternate pole solution)
- Pole ecliptic longitude: 252° ± 50° 127° ± 25° (alternate pole solution)
- Pole ecliptic latitude: 51° ± 20° 61° ± 6° (alternate pole solution)
- Geometric albedo: 0.0415±0.003
- Absolute magnitude (H): 10.93

657 Gunlöd is a dark background asteroid orbiting in the intermediate asteroid belt, approximately 43 kilometres (27 mi) in diameter. It was discovered on 23 January 1908, by astronomer August Kopff at the Heidelberg Observatory in southwest Germany. It has an albedo of around 0.042 and a rotation period of 15.7 hours.
