= 644 Cosima =

Main-belt asteroid

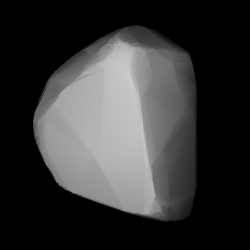
- Modelled shape of Cosima from its lightcurve

Discovery
- Discovered by: August Kopff
- Discovery site: Heidelberg
- Discovery date: 7 September 1907

Designations
- Alternative designations: 1907 AA

Orbital characteristics
- Epoch 31 July 2016 (JD 2457600.5)
- Uncertainty parameter 0
- Observation arc: 107.84 yr (39390 d)
- Aphelion: 3.0041 AU (449.41 Gm)
- Perihelion: 2.1938 AU (328.19 Gm)
- Semi-major axis: 2.5990 AU (388.80 Gm)
- Eccentricity: 0.15589
- Orbital period (sidereal): 4.19 yr (1530.4 d)
- Mean anomaly: 357.546°
- Mean motion: 0° 14^{m} 6.864^{s} / day
- Inclination: 1.0409°
- Longitude of ascending node: 109.975°
- Argument of perihelion: 268.690°

Physical characteristics
- Mean radius: 9.96±0.75 km
- Synodic rotation period: 7.556 h (0.3148 d)
- Geometric albedo: 0.1572±0.028
- Absolute magnitude (H): 11.13

644 Cosima is a minor planet orbiting the Sun.
