= 1631 Kopff =

Main-belt asteroid

Discovery
- Discovered by: Y. Väisälä
- Discovery site: Turku Obs.
- Discovery date: 11 October 1936

Designations
- Named after: August Kopff (astronomer)
- Alternative designations: 1936 UC · 1926 TH; 1935 FG · 1946 SA; 1952 HV_{2}
- Minor planet category: main-belt · Flora

Orbital characteristics
- Epoch 4 September 2017 (JD 2458000.5)
- Uncertainty parameter 0
- Observation arc: 90.37 yr (33,006 days)
- Aphelion: 2.7129 AU
- Perihelion: 1.7572 AU
- Semi-major axis: 2.2350 AU
- Eccentricity: 0.2138
- Orbital period (sidereal): 3.34 yr (1,220 days)
- Mean anomaly: 107.17°
- Inclination: 7.4943°
- Longitude of ascending node: 16.826°
- Argument of perihelion: 315.11°

Physical characteristics
- Dimensions: 8.636±0.395 km 9.58±0.21 km 9.66±1.2 km 9.71 km (derived)
- Synodic rotation period: 6.683±0.001 h
- Geometric albedo: 0.2497±0.074; 0.259±0.012; 0.2710 (derived); 0.342±0.061
- Spectral type: S
- Absolute magnitude (H): 12.1 · 12.2 · 12.57±0.35

1631 Kopff (provisional designation 1936 UC) is a stony Florian asteroid from the inner regions of the asteroid belt, approximately 9 kilometers in diameter. It was discovered on 11 October 1936, by Finnish astronomer Yrjö Väisälä at Turku Observatory in Southwest Finland. (Note: Quoted from Dictionary of Minor Planet Names – (1631) Kopff: "Karl Reinmuth discovered the planet as 1926 TH on 5 October 1926. The planet could only have been observed on two nights which was not sufficient to derive a reliable orbit. The discovery is therefore credited to Yrjö Väisälä. Elliptical elements were derived by H. Walter (MPC 1897) from five positions of 1936 UC. The identity between both apparitions was found by André Patry (MPC 1451).") It was later named after German astronomer August Kopff.

== Classification and orbit ==
Kopff is a member of the Flora family, one of the largest collisional families of stony S-type asteroid. It orbits the Sun in the inner main-belt at a distance of 1.8–2.7 AU once every 3 years and 4 months (1,220 days). Its orbit has an eccentricity of 0.21 and an inclination of 7° with respect to the ecliptic. First identified as 1926 TH at Heidelberg in 1926, the body's observation arc begins with its official discovery observation at Turku in 1936.

== Physical characteristics ==
=== Rotation period ===
In November 2003, a rotational lightcurve of Kopff was obtained from remote photometric observations at the Tenagra and Tenagra II Observatories. Lightcurve analysis gave a well-defined rotation period of 6.683 hours with a brightness variation of 0.41 magnitude (U=3).

=== Diameter and albedo ===
According to the surveys carried out by the Infrared Astronomical Satellite IRAS, the Japanese Akari satellite, and NASA's Wide-field Infrared Survey Explorer with its subsequent NEOWISE mission, Kopff measures between 8.64 and 9.66 kilometers in diameter and its surface has an albedo between 0.2497 and 0.342. The Collaborative Asteroid Lightcurve Link derives an albedo of 0.271 and a diameter of 9.71 kilometers, with an absolute magnitude of 12.1.

== Naming ==
This minor planet was named for German astronomer August Kopff (1882–1960). He was first an assistant to Max Wolf, and became later a prolific discoverer of minor planets himself. In 1924, Kopff became Director of the Astronomisches Rechen-Institut in Berlin, and, after the western section moved to Heidelberg, he also became director of the Heidelberg Observatory. Under his leadership, the third Catalogue of Fundamental Stars (FK3) was compiled and the work on the fourth catalogue (FK4) was initiated. The lunar crater Kopff is also named in his honour. The official naming citation was published by the Minor Planet Center on 20 February 1976 (M.P.C. 3931).
