= 633 Zelima =

Main-belt asteroid

Discovery
- Discovered by: August Kopff
- Discovery site: Heidelberg
- Discovery date: 12 May 1907

Designations
- Alternative designations: 1907 ZM

Orbital characteristics
- Epoch 31 July 2016 (JD 2457600.5)
- Uncertainty parameter 0
- Observation arc: 108.93 yr (39785 d)
- Aphelion: 3.2736 AU (489.72 Gm)
- Perihelion: 2.7719 AU (414.67 Gm)
- Semi-major axis: 3.0227 AU (452.19 Gm)
- Eccentricity: 0.082992
- Orbital period (sidereal): 5.26 yr (1919.6 d)
- Mean anomaly: 214.689°
- Mean motion: 0° 11^{m} 15.144^{s} / day
- Inclination: 10.908°
- Longitude of ascending node: 147.360°
- Argument of perihelion: 188.537°

Physical characteristics
- Mean radius: 17.185±0.7 km
- Synodic rotation period: 11.724 h (0.4885 d)
- Geometric albedo: 0.1918±0.017
- Absolute magnitude (H): 9.73

633 Zelima is a minor planet orbiting the Sun in the asteroid belt with a magnitude of 10.7. The name may have been inspired by the asteroid's provisional designation 1907 ZM.
