= 647 Adelgunde =

Main-belt asteroid

Discovery
- Discovered by: A. Kopff
- Discovery site: Heidelberg Obs.
- Discovery date: 11 September 1907

Designations
- Named after: unknown
- Alternative designations: 1907 AD · 1930 SA; 1949 YJ · 1960 PA
- Minor planet category: main-belt · (inner)

Orbital characteristics
- Epoch 4 September 2017 (JD 2458000.5)
- Uncertainty parameter 0
- Observation arc: 109.79 yr (40,102 days)
- Aphelion: 2.9166 AU
- Perihelion: 1.9659 AU
- Semi-major axis: 2.4412 AU
- Eccentricity: 0.1947
- Orbital period (sidereal): 3.81 yr (1,393 days)
- Mean anomaly: 237.76°
- Mean motion: 0° 15^{m} 30.24^{s} / day
- Inclination: 7.3311°
- Longitude of ascending node: 254.68°
- Argument of perihelion: 175.79°

Physical characteristics
- Dimensions: 9.725±0.092; 9.769±0.108 km 9.93±0.59 km 13.69±0.76 km 15.52 km (calculated)
- Synodic rotation period: 32.202±0.007 h
- Geometric albedo: 0.20 (assumed); 0.257±0.031; 0.488±0.105; 0.508±0.040; 0.5143±0.0862
- Spectral type: Tholen = X · S B–V = 0.719; U–B = 0.297
- Absolute magnitude (H): 10.89±0.57 · 11.41

647 Adelgunde, provisional designation 1907 AD, is a stony asteroid from the inner regions of the asteroid belt, approximately 13 kilometers in diameter. It was discovered on 11 September 1907, by German astronomer August Kopff at Heidelberg Observatory in southern Germany. The origin of the asteroid's name is unknown, it may be derived from the name of Princess Adelgunde of Bavaria.

== Orbit and classification ==
Adelgunde orbits the Sun in the inner main-belt at a distance of 2.0–2.9 AU once every 3 years and 10 months (1,393 days). Its orbit has an eccentricity of 0.19 and an inclination of 7° with respect to the ecliptic. As no precoveries were taken, Adelgunde's observation arc begins with its official discovery observation.

== Physical characteristics ==
=== Diameter and albedo ===
According to the space-based observations by NASA's Wide-field Infrared Survey Explorer and its subsequent NEOWISE mission, Adelgunde measures between 9.72 and 9.93 kilometers in diameter, and its surface has a high albedo of 0.488–0.514.

Based on the survey carried out by the Japanese Akari satellite, it measures 13.7 kilometers with an albedo of 0.26. The Collaborative Asteroid Lightcurve Link (CALL) agrees with the results obtained by AKARI, assumes a standard albedo for stony asteroids of 0.20, and calculates a diameter of 15.5 kilometers with an absolute magnitude of 11.41. As the diameters are typically inferred from the body's absolute brightness and its reflectively, a higher albedo results in a smaller diameter.

=== Spectral type ===
Adelgunde is an X-type asteroid on the Tholen taxonomic scheme, while CALL assumes it to be a stony S-type asteroid.

=== Rotation period ===
In August 2006, a rotational lightcurve of Adelgunde was obtained from photometric observations by astronomers Pierre Antonini and Antonio Vagnozzi. Lightcurve analysis gave a well-defined rotation period of 32.202 hours with a brightness variation of 0.28 in magnitude (U=3).

== Name ==
The origin of this minor planet's name is unknown. It is speculated that the name comes from a list created in 1913 by the Astronomisches Rechen-Institut (ARI) containing suggestions of female names from history and mythology for the naming of minor planets. At the time, the naming process was not well developed and the ARI feared inconsistencies and potential confusion. The list was sent to several German astronomers, including Kopff, with the invitation to name all of their made discoveries up to number 700.

=== Unknown meaning ===
Among the many thousands of named minor planets, Adelgunde is one of 120 asteroids, for which no official naming citation has been published. All of these low-numbered asteroids have numbers between 164 Eva and 1514 Ricouxa and were discovered between 1876 and the 1930s, predominantly by astronomers Auguste Charlois, Johann Palisa, Max Wolf and Karl Reinmuth.
