= 291 Alice =

Main-belt asteroid

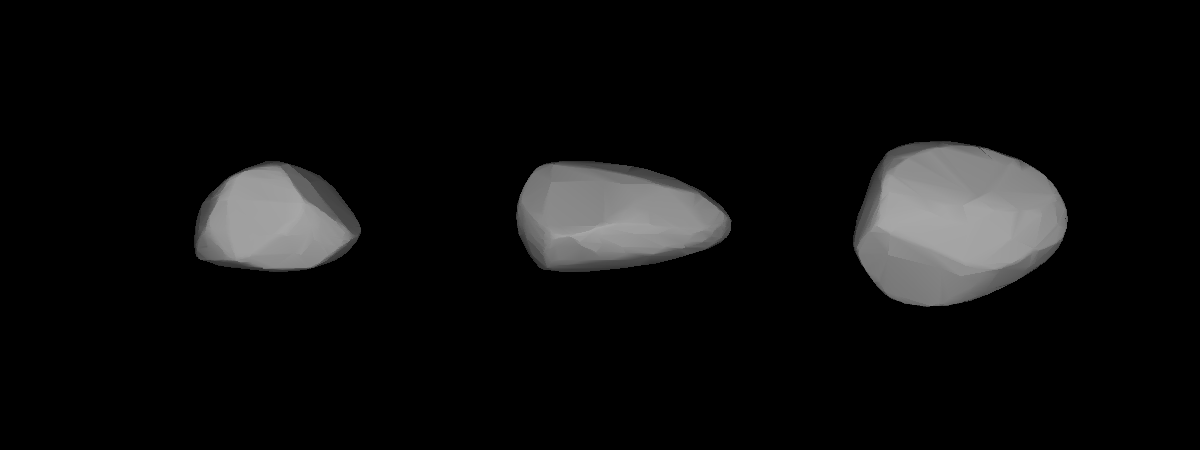
- A three-dimensional model of 291 Alice based on its lightcurve

Discovery
- Discovered by: Johann Palisa
- Discovery date: 25 April 1890

Designations
- Alternative designations: A890 HA, 1954 UJ_{3}
- Minor planet category: main-belt

Orbital characteristics
- Epoch 31 July 2016 (JD 2457600.5)
- Uncertainty parameter 0
- Observation arc: 124.62 yr (45516 d)
- Aphelion: 2.4273 AU (363.12 Gm)
- Perihelion: 2.01631 AU (301.636 Gm)
- Semi-major axis: 2.22182 AU (332.380 Gm)
- Eccentricity: 0.092495
- Orbital period (sidereal): 3.31 yr (1209.7 d)
- Mean anomaly: 115.293°
- Mean motion: 0° 17^{m} 51.382^{s} / day
- Inclination: 1.8555°
- Longitude of ascending node: 161.655°
- Argument of perihelion: 331.580°

Physical characteristics
- Dimensions: 14.97±1.1 km 19×12×11 km
- Mass: ~
- Mean density: ~2.7 g/cm^{3}
- Synodic rotation period: 4.313 h (0.1797 d); 0.180 d (4.32 h)
- Geometric albedo: 0.2075±0.033; 0.208
- Spectral type: S
- Absolute magnitude (H): 11.45

291 Alice is a stony background asteroid from the inner region of the asteroid belt. It was discovered by Johann Palisa on 25 April 1890 at the Vienna Observatory.

Photometric observations of this asteroid at the Leura Observatory in Leura, Australia during 2006 gave a rotation period of 4.313 ± 0.002 hours and a brightness variation of 0.20 ± 0.02 in magnitude. This result is in agreement with previous studies. Lightcurve analysis indicates that Alice's pole points towards either ecliptic coordinates (β, λ) = (55°, 65°) or (β, λ) = (55°, 245°) with a 10° uncertainty. This gives an axial tilt of about 35° in both cases.

== See also ==
- 2037 Tripaxeptalis
