= 606 Brangäne =

Asteroid discovered in 1906

Discovery
- Discovered by: A. Kopff
- Discovery site: Heidelberg Obs.
- Discovery date: 18 September 1906

Designations
- Pronunciation: German: [ˈbʁaŋɡɛːnə]
- Named after: Brangaine (opera character)
- Alternative designations: 1906 VB
- Minor planet category: main-belt · (middle); Brangäne

Orbital characteristics
- Epoch 23 March 2018 (JD 2458200.5)
- Uncertainty parameter 0
- Observation arc: 111.68 yr (40,792 d)
- Aphelion: 3.1564 AU
- Perihelion: 2.0181 AU
- Semi-major axis: 2.5872 AU
- Eccentricity: 0.2200
- Orbital period (sidereal): 4.16 yr (1,520 d)
- Mean anomaly: 276.59°
- Mean motion: 0° 14^{m} 12.48^{s} / day
- Inclination: 8.5990°
- Longitude of ascending node: 318.48°
- Argument of perihelion: 58.344°

Physical characteristics
- Mean diameter: 28.15±4.91 km 35.54±2.2 km 35.758±0.165 km 36.18±0.53 km
- Synodic rotation period: 12.2950±0.0001 h
- Geometric albedo: 0.096; 0.096±0.009; 0.0986; 0.13
- Spectral type: Tholen = TSD; SMASS = K B–V = 0.770; U–B = 0.391
- Absolute magnitude (H): 10.20; 10.3; 10.38; 10.49

606 Brangäne, provisional designation 1906 VB, is an asteroid from the central regions of the asteroid belt, approximately 36 kilometers (22 miles) in diameter. It was discovered on 18 September 1906, by astronomer August Kopff at the Heidelberg Observatory in southwest Germany. The unusual K-type asteroid is the namesake of the small Brangäne family and has a rotation period of 12.3 hours. It was named after Brangaine, a character from the opera Tristan und Isolde by Richard Wagner.

== Orbit and classification ==
Brangäne is the principal body of the stony Brangäne family, a small asteroid family of less than 200 known members. It orbits the Sun in the central main-belt at a distance of 2.0–3.2 AU once every 4 years and 2 months (1,520 days; semi-major axis of 2.59 AU). Its orbit has an eccentricity of 0.22 and an inclination of 9° with respect to the ecliptic.

== Physical characteristics ==
In the SMASS classification, Brangäne is an uncommon K-type asteroid, while in the Tholen classification its spectral type is ambiguous, closest to a T-type and somewhat similar to that of an S- and D-type.

=== Rotation period ===
In November 2006, a rotational lightcurve of Brangäne was obtained from photometric observations by French amateur astronomers Raymond Poncy and René Roy. Lightcurve analysis gave a rotation period of 12.2950±0.0001 hours with a brightness amplitude of 0.20 magnitude (U=3-).

=== Diameter and albedo ===
According to the surveys carried out by the Infrared Astronomical Satellite IRAS, the Japanese Akari satellite and the NEOWISE mission of NASA's Wide-field Infrared Survey Explorer, Brangäne measures between 28.15 and 36.18 kilometers in diameter and its surface has an albedo between 0.096 and 0.13. The Collaborative Asteroid Lightcurve Link adopts an albedo of 0.1075 and a diameter of 36.96 kilometers, based on an absolute magnitude of 10.2, from Petr Pravec's revised WISE-data.

== Naming ==
This minor planet was named after Brangaine, a character from the opera Tristan und Isolde by Richard Wagner. The official naming citation was mentioned in The Names of the Minor Planets by Paul Herget in 1955 (H 64).
