= 651 Antikleia =

Main-belt asteroid

Discovery
- Discovered by: August Kopff
- Discovery site: Heidelberg-Königstuhl State Observatory
- Discovery date: 4 October 1907

Designations
- Pronunciation: /æntɪˈkliːə/
- Named after: Anticlea
- Alternative designations: 1907 AN
- Minor planet category: Main belt

Orbital characteristics
- Epoch 30 November 2008 (JD 2454800.5)
- Aphelion: 3.3185 AU
- Perihelion: 2.7319 AU
- Semi-major axis: 3.02523 AU
- Eccentricity: 0.09695
- Orbital period (sidereal): 1921.93 days (5.26 years)
- Mean anomaly: 86.86°
- Inclination: 10.767°
- Longitude of ascending node: 38.203°
- Argument of perihelion: 355.742°

Physical characteristics
- Dimensions: 33.04±2.2 km (mean)
- Synodic rotation period: 20.291±0.003 h; 20.287±0.004 h
- Geometric albedo: 0.1603±0.024
- Absolute magnitude (H): 10.01

651 Antikleia is a main-belt asteroid discovered on 4 October 1907 by August Kopff at the Heidelberg-Königstuhl State Observatory. It is named for Anticlea the mother of Odysseus. The name may have been inspired by the asteroid's provisional designation 1907 AN.

Antikleia is a member of the dynamic Eos family of asteroids that most likely formed as the result of a collisional breakup of a parent body.
