= August Kopff =

German astronomer

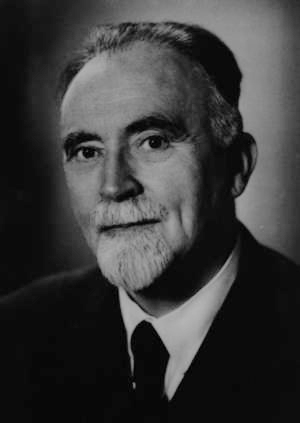
August Kopff

Minor planets discovered: 68
see § List of discovered minor planets

August Kopff (February 5, 1882 – April 25, 1960) was a German astronomer and discoverer of several comets and asteroids.

Kopff studied and worked in Heidelberg, getting his PhD there in 1906 and he then joined the Humboldt University of Berlin where he became the Director of the Institute for Astronomical Calculation.

He discovered some comets, including periodic comet 22P/Kopff and the non-periodic C/1906 E1. He discovered a number of asteroids, including notably the Trojan asteroids 617 Patroclus and 624 Hektor.

The lunar crater Kopff is named after him, as is the asteroid 1631 Kopff. Minor planet 805 Hormuthia is named after his wife, Hormuth.

== List of discovered minor planets ==
542 Susanna	15 August 1904	list^{[A]}
579 Sidonia	3 November 1905	list
582 Olympia	23 January 1906	list
584 Semiramis	15 January 1906	list
585 Bilkis	16 February 1906	list
589 Croatia	3 March 1906	list
591 Irmgard	14 March 1906	list
593 Titania	20 March 1906	list
595 Polyxena	27 March 1906	list
596 Scheila	21 February 1906	list
606 Brangane	18 September 1906	list
607 Jenny	18 September 1906	list
608 Adolfine	18 September 1906	list
612 Veronika	8 October 1906	list
613 Ginevra	11 October 1906	list
614 Pia	11 October 1906	list
615 Roswitha	11 October 1906	list
616 Elly	17 October 1906	list
617 Patroclus	17 October 1906	list
619 Triberga	22 October 1906	list
621 Werdandi	11 November 1906	list
624 Hektor	10 February 1907	list
625 Xenia	11 February 1907	list
626 Notburga	11 February 1907	list
627 Charis	4 March 1907	list

628 Christine	7 March 1907	list
629 Bernardina	7 March 1907	list
630 Euphemia	7 March 1907	list
631 Philippina	21 March 1907	list
632 Pyrrha	5 April 1907	list
633 Zelima	12 May 1907	list
634 Ute	12 May 1907	list
640 Brambilla	29 August 1907	list
643 Scheherezade	8 September 1907	list
644 Cosima	7 September 1907	list
646 Kastalia	11 September 1907	list
647 Adelgunde	11 September 1907	list
648 Pippa	11 September 1907	list
649 Josefa	11 September 1907	list
650 Amalasuntha	4 October 1907	list
651 Antikleia	4 October 1907	list
654 Zelinda	4 January 1908	list
656 Beagle	22 January 1908	list
657 Gunlod	23 January 1908	list
658 Asteria	23 January 1908	list
663 Gerlinde	24 June 1908	list
664 Judith	24 June 1908	list
666 Desdemona	23 July 1908	list
667 Denise	23 July 1908	list
668 Dora	27 July 1908	list

669 Kypria	20 August 1908	list
670 Ottegebe	20 August 1908	list
672 Astarte	21 September 1908	list
677 Aaltje	18 January 1909	list
679 Pax	28 January 1909	list
680 Genoveva	22 April 1909	list
681 Gorgo	13 May 1909	list
682 Hagar	17 June 1909	list
684 Hildburg	8 August 1909	list
686 Gersuind	15 August 1909	list
692 Hippodamia	5 November 1901	list^{[B]}
693 Zerbinetta	21 September 1909	list
754 Malabar	22 August 1906	list
1780 Kippes	12 September 1906	list
1781 Van Biesbroeck	17 October 1906	list
3105 Stumpff	8 August 1907	list
3133 Sendai	4 October 1907	list
3687 Dzus	7 October 1908	list
Co-discovery made with:^{A} P. Götz^{B} M. F. Wolf
