= 621 Werdandi =

Main-belt asteroid

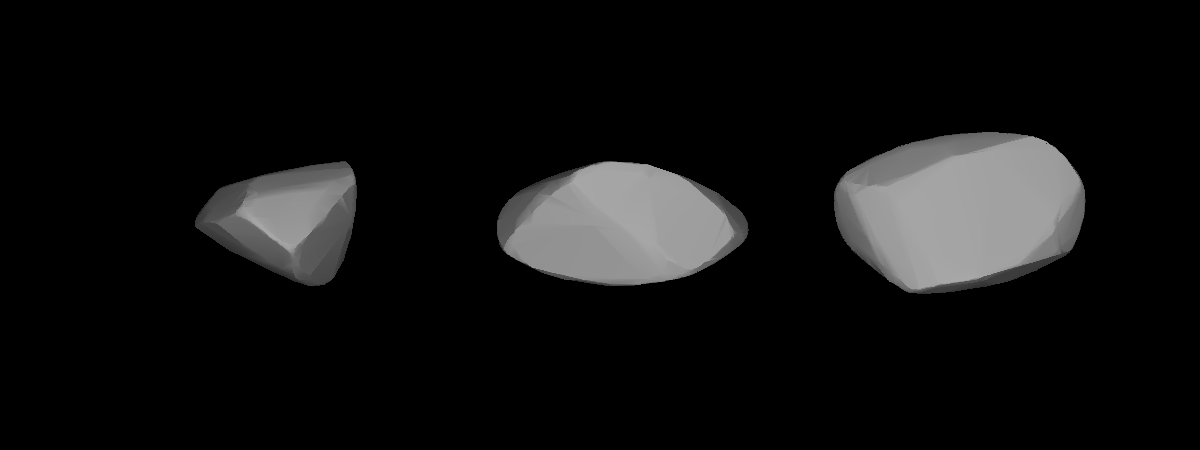
- A three-dimensional model of 621 Werdandi based on its light curve

Discovery
- Discovered by: August Kopff
- Discovery site: Heidelberg
- Discovery date: 11 November 1906

Designations
- Alternative designations: 1906 WJ

Orbital characteristics
- Epoch 31 July 2016 (JD 2457600.5)
- Uncertainty parameter 0
- Observation arc: 104.13 yr (38035 d)
- Aphelion: 3.5597 AU (532.52 Gm)
- Perihelion: 2.6941 AU (403.03 Gm)
- Semi-major axis: 3.1269 AU (467.78 Gm)
- Eccentricity: 0.13840
- Orbital period (sidereal): 5.53 yr (2019.6 d)
- Mean anomaly: 299.847°
- Mean motion: 0° 10^{m} 41.7^{s} / day
- Inclination: 2.3146°
- Longitude of ascending node: 67.107°
- Argument of perihelion: 31.965°

Physical characteristics
- Mean radius: 13.575±0.75 km
- Synodic rotation period: 11.776 h (0.4907 d)
- Geometric albedo: 0.1527±0.018
- Absolute magnitude (H): 10.49

621 Werdandi is a Themistian asteroid.
