= 608 Adolfine =

Main-belt asteroid

Discovery
- Discovered by: August Kopff
- Discovery site: Heidelberg
- Discovery date: 18 September 1906

Designations
- Alternative designations: 1906 VD

Orbital characteristics
- Epoch 31 July 2016 (JD 2457600.5)
- Uncertainty parameter 0
- Observation arc: 104.60 yr (38206 d)
- Aphelion: 3.3986 AU (508.42 Gm)
- Perihelion: 2.6455 AU (395.76 Gm)
- Semi-major axis: 3.0221 AU (452.10 Gm)
- Eccentricity: 0.12459
- Orbital period (sidereal): 5.25 yr (1918.9 d)
- Mean anomaly: 319.449°
- Mean motion: 0° 11^{m} 15.396^{s} / day
- Inclination: 9.3799°
- Longitude of ascending node: 293.861°
- Argument of perihelion: 71.494°

Physical characteristics
- Mean radius: 12.59±1.15 km
- Synodic rotation period: 8.3458 h (0.34774 d)
- Geometric albedo: 0.1603±0.034
- Absolute magnitude (H): 10.8

608 Adolfine is a minor planet, specifically an asteroid orbiting in the asteroid belt.

The light curve of 608 Adolfine shows a periodicity of 8.37 ± 0.03 hours, during which time the brightness of the object varies by 0.25 ± 0.05 in magnitude.
