= Van Biesbroeck (crater) =

Crater on the Moon

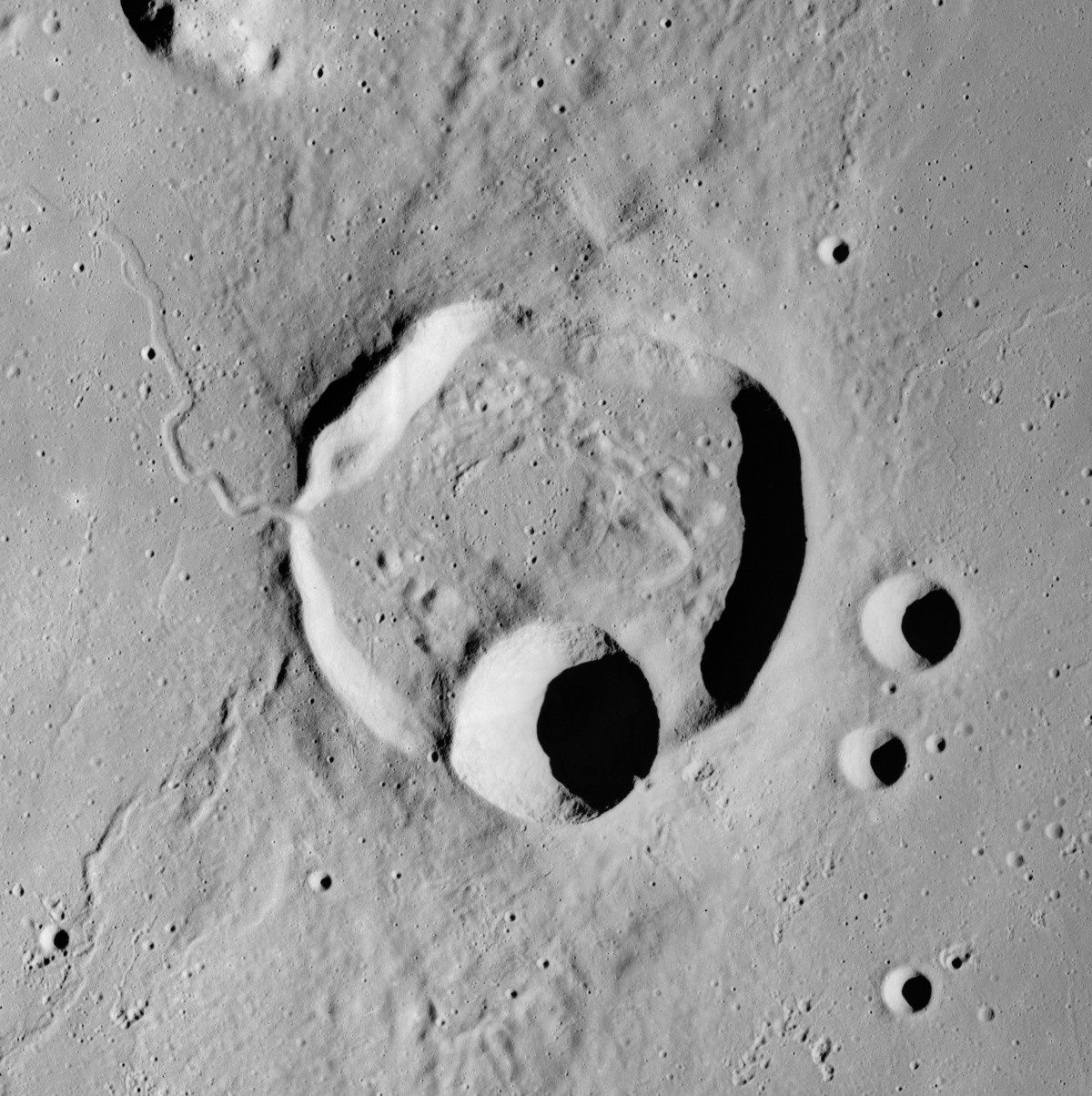
- Van Biesbroeck crater lies across the southern rim of Krieger crater. Southeast of Krieger are the small craters Rocco and Ruth (5 km and 3 km in diameter). Apollo 15 photo.
- Coordinates: 28.77°N 45.59°W
- Diameter: 9.08 km (5.64 mi)
- Depth: unknown
- Colongitude: 46° at sunrise
- Eponym: George A. Van Biesbroeck

Van Biesbroeck is a small lunar impact crater that interrupts the southern rim of the lava-flooded crater Krieger, in the Oceanus Procellarum. The crater is circular and symmetrical, with sloping inner walls that run down to a small interior floor. Van Biesbroeck was designated Krieger B before the IAU gave it a unique name in 1976.

== See also ==
- 1781 Van Biesbroeck, minor planet
