= J-type asteroid =

Type of asteroid

J-type asteroids are asteroids with spectra similar to that of diogenite meteorites and so, presumably, to the deeper layers of the crust of 4 Vesta.

Their spectra are rather similar to that of the V-type asteroids but have a particularly strong 1 μm absorption band.

Examples are 2442 Corbett, 3869 Norton, 4005 Dyagilev, and 4215 Kamo.

== See also ==
- Asteroid spectral types
