= 41 Daphne =

Main-belt asteroid

- VLT-SPHERE image of Daphne

Discovery
- Discovered by: H. Goldschmidt
- Discovery date: 22 May 1856

Designations
- Pronunciation: /ˈdæfni/
- Named after: Daphne
- Alternative designations: 1949 TG
- Minor planet category: Main belt
- Adjectives: Daphnean /ˈdæfniən/

Orbital characteristics
- Epoch 31 December 2006 (JD 2454100.5)
- Aphelion: 3.517 AU (526.144 million km)
- Perihelion: 2.014 AU (301.220 million km)
- Semi-major axis: 2.765 AU (413.682 million km)
- Eccentricity: 0.272
- Orbital period (sidereal): 4.60 a (1,679.618 d)
- Mean anomaly: 247.500°
- Inclination: 15.765°
- Longitude of ascending node: 178.159°
- Argument of perihelion: 46.239°
- Known satellites: Peneius /pɛˈniːəs/ (S/2008 (41) 1)

Physical characteristics
- Dimensions: (235 ± 17 × 183 ± 16 × 153 ± 14) km(237.9 × 184.8 × 156.0) ± 21.5 km
- Mean diameter: 187±13 km
- Volume: (3.39±0.71)×10^{6} km^{3}
- Mass: (6.10±0.89)×10^{18} kg
- Mean density: 1.77±0.26 g/cm^{3}
- Synodic rotation period: 5.987981±0.00006 hr
- Axial tilt: 126°
- Pole ecliptic longitude: 199.4° ± 5°
- Pole ecliptic latitude: −31.9° ± 5°
- Geometric albedo: 0.052 (calculated); 0.059±0.007
- Spectral type: C
- Absolute magnitude (H): 7.12; 7.58

41 Daphne is a large asteroid from the asteroid belt. It is a dark-surfaced body 187 km in diameter and is probably composed of primitive carbonaceous chondrites. The spectra of the asteroid displays evidence of aqueous alteration. It was discovered by H. Goldschmidt on 22 May 1856, and named after Daphne, the nymph in Greek mythology who was turned into a laurel tree. Incorrect orbital calculations initially resulted in 56 Melete being mistaken for a second sighting of Daphne. Daphne was not sighted again until 31 August 1862.

The orbit of 41 Daphne places it in a 9:22 mean motion resonance with the planet Mars. The computed Lyapunov time for this asteroid is 14,000 years, indicating that it occupies a chaotic orbit that will change randomly over time because of gravitational perturbations of the planets.

In 1999, Daphne occulted three stars, and on 2 July 1999, produced eleven chords indicating an ellipsoid of 213×160 km. Daphnean lightcurves also suggest that the asteroid is irregular in shape. Daphne was observed by Arecibo radar in April 2008. Based upon radar data, the near surface solid density of the asteroid is 2.4^{+0.7}_{−0.5} g cm^{−3}.

== Satellite ==
Peneius
- Daphne and Peneius as seen by the W.M. Keck II telescope in 2008

Designations
- Pronunciation: /pɛˈniːəs/
- Alternative designations: S/2008 (41) 1
- Adjectives: Peneian /pɛˈniːən/

Orbital characteristics
- Inclination: °

41 Daphne has at least one satellite, named Peneius (provisionally S/2008 (41) 1). It was identified on 28 March 2008, and has a projected separation of 443 km, an orbital period of approximately 1.1 days, and an estimated diameter of less than 2 km. If these preliminary observations hold up, this binary system has the most extreme size ratio known. In Greek myth, Pēneios is the god of the river of that name, and father of Daphne.
