= List of geological features on 21 Lutetia =

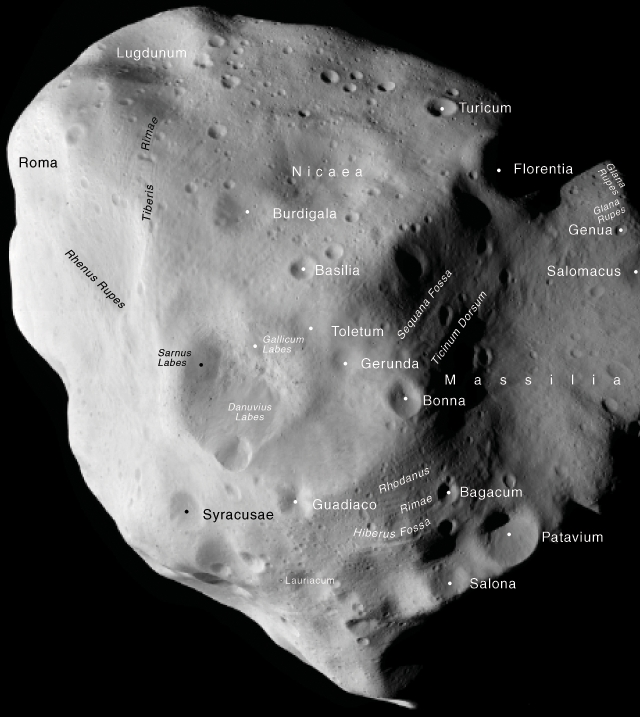
Annotated image of 21 Lutetia

This is a list of named geological features on 21 Lutetia. There are 37 officially named features on Lutetia, of which:

- 19 are craters,
- 8 are Regiones,
- 3 are Labes,
- 2 are Fossae,
- 2 are Rimae,
- 2 are Rupes, and
- 1 is a Dorsum.

21 Lutetia was flown by in July 2010 by the Rosetta spacecraft, while en route to comet 67P/Churyumov–Gerasimenko. During this visit, Rosetta imaged Lutetia with a resolution of 60 metres (200 feet) per pixel. As Lutetia is named after the Roman town that would later become Paris, most features on Lutetia are named after places in Europe during the Roman era.

== Craters ==
Impact craters on 21 Lutetia are named after cities in Europe around the Roman era. Based on the images taken of the northern side of Lutetia by Rosetta, it is suspected there is a large crater named Suspicio crater on the southern side of Lutetia, however it has not been directly imaged, so it remains unconfirmed, and therefore is not included in this list.

Crater	Coordinates	Diameter (km)	Approval Date	Named After	Ref
Bagacum	46°N 49°E	3.7	5 April 2011	City at the time of Lutetia, present-day Bavay in France.	WGPSN
Basilia	73°N 184°E	3.5	5 April 2011	City at the time of Lutetia, present-day Basel in Switzerland.	WGPSN
Bonna	62°N 67°E	6	5 April 2011	City at the time of Lutetia, present-day Bonn in Germany.	WGPSN
Burdigala	52°N 211°E	10	5 April 2011	City at the time of Lutetia, present-day Bordeaux in France.	WGPSN
Florentia	23°N 137°E	10.9	5 April 2011	City at the time of Lutetia, present-day Florence in Italy.	WGPSN
Gaudiaco	58°N 5°E	6.7	5 April 2011	City at the time of Lutetia, present-day Joué-lès-Tours in France.	WGPSN
Genua	11°N 117°E	1.8	5 April 2011	City at the time of Lutetia, present-day Genoa in Italy.	WGPSN
Gerunda	78°N 68°E	4.7	5 April 2011	City at the time of Lutetia, present-day Girona in Spain.	WGPSN
Lauriacum	37°N 0°E	1.5	2 September 2011	City at the time of Lutetia, present-day Enns in Austria; defines zero degrees longitude on Lutetia.	WGPSN
Lugdunum	10°N 219°E	17	5 April 2011	City at the time of Lutetia, present-day Lyon in France.	WGPSN
Massilia	41°N 96°E	61	5 April 2011	City at the time of Lutetia, present-day Marseille in France.	WGPSN
Nicaea	43°N 181°E	21	5 April 2011	City at the time of Lutetia, present-day Nice in France.	WGPSN
Patavium	31°N 52°E	9.3	5 April 2011	City at the time of Lutetia, present-day Padua in Italy.	WGPSN
Roma	13°N 243°E	19	5 April 2011	City at the time of Lutetia, present-day Rome in Italy.	WGPSN
Salomacus	11°N 109°E	7	5 April 2011	City at the time of Lutetia, present-day Salles (Gironde) in France.	WGPSN
Salona	32°N 37°E	7.1	5 April 2011	City at the time of Lutetia, present-day Solin in Croatia.	WGPSN
Syracusae	39°N 328°E	7	5 April 2011	City at the time of Lutetia, present-day Syracuse in Italy.	WGPSN
Toletum	87°N 161°E	6	5 April 2011	City at the time of Lutetia, present-day Toledo in Spain.	WGPSN
Turicum	20°N 158°E	3.8	5 April 2011	City at the time of Lutetia, present-day Zurich in Switzerland.	WGPSN

== Dorsa ==
Dorsa on 21 Lutetia are named after rivers in Europe around the Roman era. Ticinum Dorsum might be associated with Suspicio Crater, on the far side of Lutetia.

Dorsum	Coordinates	Diameter (km)	Approval Date	Named After	Ref
Ticinum Dorsum	51°N 100°E	8.5	5 April 2011	River at the time of Lutetia, present-day Ticino River in Italy.	WGPSN

== Fossae ==
Fossae on 21 Lutetia are named after rivers in Europe around the Roman era. Hiberus Fossa is associated with a large (~40 km) unnamed crater composed partially of Danuvius Labes, Gallicum Labes, and Sarnus Labes. Sequana Fossa might be associated with Suspicio Crater, on the far side of Lutetia.

Fossa	Coordinates	Diameter (km)	Approval Date	Named After	Ref
Hiberus Fossa	46°N 33°E	12.8	5 April 2011	River at the time of Lutetia, present-day Ebro River in Spain.	WGPSN
Sequana Fossa	57°N 106°E	7.9	5 April 2011	River at the time of Lutetia, present-day Seine River in France.	WGPSN

== Labes ==
Labes on 21 Lutetia are named after rivers in Europe around the Roman era. All of these features partially make up a large (~40 km) unnamed crater on the near side of Lutetia.

Labes	Coordinates	Diameter (km)	Approval Date	Named After	Ref
Danuvius Labes	70°N 333°E	0	5 April 2011	River at the time of Lutetia, present-day Danube River in Europe.	WGPSN
Gallicum Labes	77°N 287°E	0	5 April 2011	River at the time of Lutetia, present-day Gállego River in Spain.	WGPSN
Sarnus Labes	63°N 285°E	0	5 April 2011	River at the time of Lutetia, present-day Sarno River in Italy.	WGPSN

== Regiones ==
Most Regiones on 21 Lutetia are named after provinces of the Roman Empire, with the exception of Goldschmidt Regio.

Regio	Coordinates	Diameter (km)	Approval Date	Named After	Ref
Achaia Regio	28°N 206°E	0	5 April 2011	Province of the Roman Empire at the time of Lutetia, located in ancient and present-day Greece.	WGPSN
Baetica Regio	69°N 318°E	0	5 April 2011	Province of the Roman Empire at the time of Lutetia, its location corresponds to present-day Andalusia province, Spain.	WGPSN
Etruria Regio	19°N 282°E	0	5 April 2011	Province of the Roman Empire at the time of Lutetia, its location corresponds to present-day central Italy.	WGPSN
Goldschmidt Regio	65°S 359°E	0	5 April 2011	Hermann; French astronomer of German origin, discoverer of asteroid (21) Lutetia (1802–1866).	WGPSN
Narbonensis Regio	34°N 101°E	0	5 April 2011	Province of the Roman Empire at the time of Lutetia, its location corresponds to present-day southern France.	WGPSN
Noricum Regio	41°N 10°E	0	5 April 2011	Province of the Roman Empire at the time of Lutetia, its location corresponds to present-day Austria and a part of Slovenia.	WGPSN
Pannonia Regio	23°N 30°E	0	5 April 2011	Province of the Roman Empire at the time of Lutetia, its location corresponds to present-day western Hungary and parts of the adjacent countries.	WGPSN
Raetia Regio	20°S 305°E	0	5 April 2011	Province of the Roman Empire at the time of Lutetia, its location corresponds to present-day eastern Switzerland and parts of the adjacent countries.	WGPSN

== Rimae ==
Rimae on 21 Lutetia are named after rivers in Europe around the Roman era. Tiberis Rimae is associated with Massilia crater, and Rhodanus Rimae is associated with a large (~40 km) unnamed crater composed partially of Danuvius Labes, Gallicum Labes, and Sarnus Labes.

Rimae	Coordinates	Diameter (km)	Approval Date	Named After	Ref
Rhodanus Rimae	53°N 39°E	10.8	5 April 2011	River at the time of Lutetia, present-day Rhone River in Switzerland and France.	WGPSN
Tiberis Rimae	33°N 229°E	27.4	5 April 2011	River at the time of Lutetia, present-day Tiber River in Italy.	WGPSN

== Rupes ==
Rupes on 21 Lutetia are named after rivers in Europe around the Roman era. Glana Rupes might be associated with Suspicio Crater, on the far side of Lutetia.

Rupes	Coordinates	Diameter (km)	Approval Date	Named After	Ref
Glana Rupes	11°N 124°E	9.8	5 March 2011	River at the time of Lutetia, present-day Glonn River in Germany.	WGPSN
Rhenus Rupes	20°N 262°E	11.8	5 April 2011	River at the time of Lutetia, present-day Rhine River in Europe.	WGPSN
