= Panopea (disambiguation) =

Panopea is a Nereid of Greek mythology.

Panopea may also refer to:

- Panopea (bivalve), a genus of bivalve in the family Hiatellidae
- Panopea, a genus of moths in the family Geometridae; synonym of Epiphryne

== See also ==
- 70 Panopaea, an asteroid
