= 54 Alexandra =

Main-belt asteroid

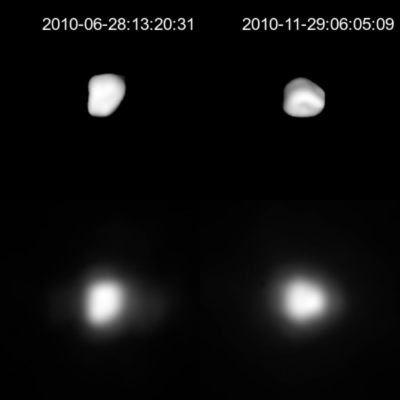
- A three-dimensional model of 54 Alexandra based on its light curve (top) and images of the asteroid (bottom)

Discovery
- Discovered by: H. Goldschmidt
- Discovery date: 10 September 1858

Designations
- Pronunciation: /ˌælɪɡˈzændrə, -ˈzɑːn-/ AL-ig-ZA(H)N-drə
- Named after: Alexander von Humboldt (German explorer)
- Minor planet category: Main belt
- Adjectives: Alexandrian

Orbital characteristics
- Epoch 31 December 2006 (JD 2454100.5)
- Aphelion: 485.483 million km (3.245 AU)
- Perihelion: 326.043 million km (2.179 AU)
- Semi-major axis: 405.763 million km (2.712 AU)
- Eccentricity: 0.196
- Orbital period (sidereal): 1,631.620 d (4.47 a)
- Mean anomaly: 103.809°
- Inclination: 11.804°
- Longitude of ascending node: 313.446°
- Argument of perihelion: 345.594°

Physical characteristics
- Dimensions: 160 × 135 km (± 1 km)
- Mean diameter: 143 ± 5 km
- Mass: (2.83±0.31)×10^{18} kg (Note: Calculated from its standard gravitational parameter GM = 0.189±0.021 km^{3}/s^{2}.)
- Mean density: 1.85±0.29 g/cm^{3}
- Synodic rotation period: 7.022642 h
- Pole ecliptic longitude: 155°±4°
- Pole ecliptic latitude: 17°±3°
- Geometric albedo: 0.059 ± 0.014; 0.056
- Spectral type: Tholen = C SMASS = C
- Absolute magnitude (H): 7.94

54 Alexandra is a carbonaceous asteroid from the intermediate asteroid belt, approximately 155 kilometers in diameter. It was discovered by German-French astronomer Hermann Goldschmidt on 10 September 1858, and named after the German explorer Alexander von Humboldt; it was the first asteroid to be named after a male.

== Description ==
On 17 May 2005, this asteroid occulted a faint star (magnitude 8.5) and the event was observed and timed in a number of locations within the U.S. and Mexico. As a result, a silhouette profile was produced, yielding a roughly oval cross-section with dimensions of 160 × 135 km (± 1 km). The mass of the asteroid can be estimated based upon the mutually perturbing effects of other bodies, yielding an estimate of (2.83±0.31)×10^{18} kg.

Photometric observations of this asteroid during 1990–92 gave a light curve with a period of 18.14 ± 0.04 hours and a brightness variation of 0.10 in magnitude. Alexandra has been studied by radar. It was the namesake and largest member of the former Alexandra asteroid family; a dynamic group of C-type asteroids that share similar orbital elements. Other members included 70 Panopaea and 145 Adeona. 145 Adeona was subsequently assigned to the Adeona family, with Alexandra and Panopaea being dropped.

== In popular culture ==
In the Swedish film Aniara, 54 Alexandra is the closest celestial body which the off-course and out-of-control spacecraft will approach before it leaves the Solar System.
