= Hiberus Fossa =

Fossa on Lutetia

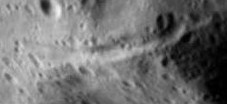
- An image of Hiberus Fossa, captured by the Rosetta spacecraft in 2010
- Feature type: Fossa
- Location: 21 Lutetia
- Coordinates: 46.00°N 33.00°E
- Diameter: 12.8 km (8.0 mi)
- Discoverer: via the Rosetta, in c. July 2010
- Naming: 5 April 2011
- Eponym: Ebro River in Spain

The Hiberus Fossa is a fossa on 21 Lutetia, a main-belt asteroid, that was discovered via the Rosetta spacecraft in c. July 2010. The fossa was named after the Latin name of the Ebro River in Spain, at the time of Lutetia. The name "Hiberus Fossa" was officially approved by the International Astronomical Union (IAU) on 5 April 2011.

== Geology and characteristics ==
Its coordinates are 46.00°N 33.00°E, with an estimated diameter of approximately 12.8 kilometres (8.0 mi).

== See also ==
- List of geological features on 21 Lutetia
