= 32 Pomona =

Main-belt asteroid

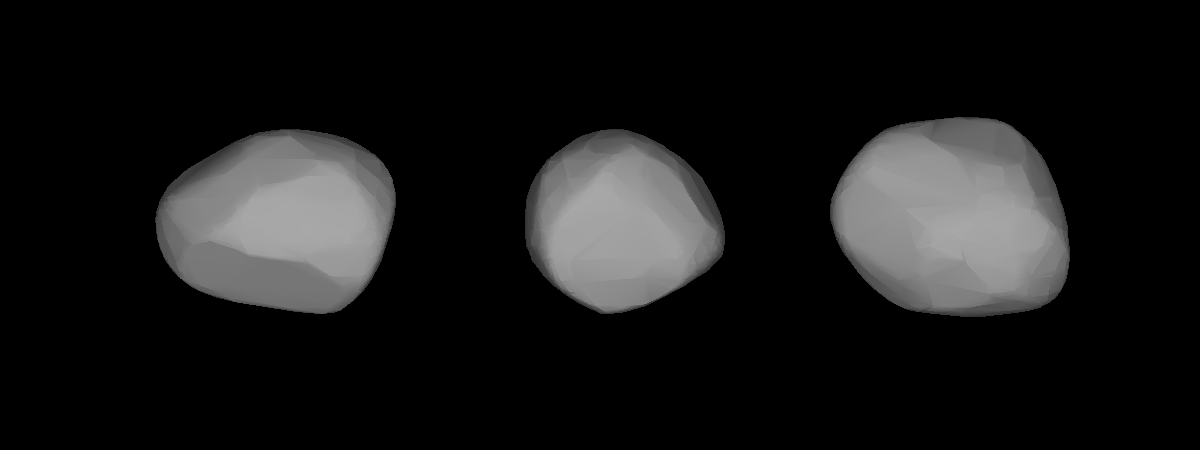
- A three-dimensional model of 32 Pomona based on its light curve

Discovery
- Discovered by: H. Goldschmidt
- Discovery date: 26 October 1854

Designations
- Pronunciation: /pəˈmoʊnə/
- Named after: Pōmōna
- Alternative designations: A899 QA; A911 KF; 1945 RB; 1949 SH; 1950 YD
- Minor planet category: Main belt
- Adjectives: Pomonian /pəˈmoʊniən/

Orbital characteristics
- Epoch 21 November 2025 (JD 2461000.5)
- Aphelion: 2.798 AU
- Perihelion: 2.377 AU
- Semi-major axis: 2.588 AU
- Eccentricity: 0.081
- Orbital period (sidereal): 4.163 yr (1520.57 d)
- Mean anomaly: 242.006°
- Inclination: 5.521°
- Longitude of ascending node: 220.357°
- Time of perihelion: 2027-Apr-02
- Argument of perihelion: 337.859°
- Jupiter MOID: 2.169 AU
- T_{Jupiter}: 3.410

Physical characteristics
- Dimensions: 80.76±1.6 km
- Mass: (8.88 ± 4.17/1.67)×10^{17} kg (9.1±1.8)×10^{17} kg (Note: Calculated from its standard gravitational parameter GM = 0.061±0.012 km^{3}/s^{2}.)
- Mean density: 3.102 ± 1.455/0.584 g/cm^{3} (Note: Assuming a diameter of 81.78 ± 3.74 km.); 3.32 g/cm^{3} (Note: Assuming a diameter of 80.8 km.)
- Synodic rotation period: 0.3937 d (9.448 h)
- Geometric albedo: 0.2564
- Spectral type: S
- Absolute magnitude (H): 7.79

32 Pomona (/pəˈmoʊnə/ pə-MOH-nə;) is a stony main-belt asteroid that is 81 kilometres (50 mi) in diameter. It was discovered by German-French astronomer Hermann Mayer Salomon Goldschmidt on 26 October 1854, and is named after Pōmōna, the Roman goddess of fruit trees.

Photometric observations of this asteroid gave a light curve with a synodic rotation period of 9.448 hours. The data was used to construct a model for the asteroid, revealing it to be an angular object that is spinning about a pole with ecliptic coordinates (β, λ) = (+58°, 267°). The ratio of the major to minor axes' lengths is roughly equal to 1.3.

The spectrum of 32 Pomona matches an S-type in the Tholen classification system, and is similar to primitive achondrite meteorites. Measurements of the thermal inertia of 32 Pomona give a value of around 20–120 m^{−2} K^{−1} s^{−1/2}, compared to 50 for lunar regolith and 400 for coarse sand in an atmosphere.

== Observations ==
Australian amateur astronomer Jonathan Bradshaw recorded an unusual asteroid occultation by 32 Pomona on 16 August 2008. The expected maximum duration of the occultation was 7.1 secs; however, the video recording shows two separate occultations of equal depth each lasting 1.2 seconds, separated by 0.8 secs. Those durations convert to chord lengths at the asteroid of 15 km, 10 km, and 15 km – for a total length of 40 km. The IRAS diameter for Pomona is 80.76 ± 1.6 km. The most likely explanation for this observation is that the asteroid is either binary (including a contact binary), or is a unitary asteroid with a significant concave region on its surface. The video of this occultation can be viewed on YouTube.
