= 56 Melete =

Large, dark, P-type main-belt asteroid

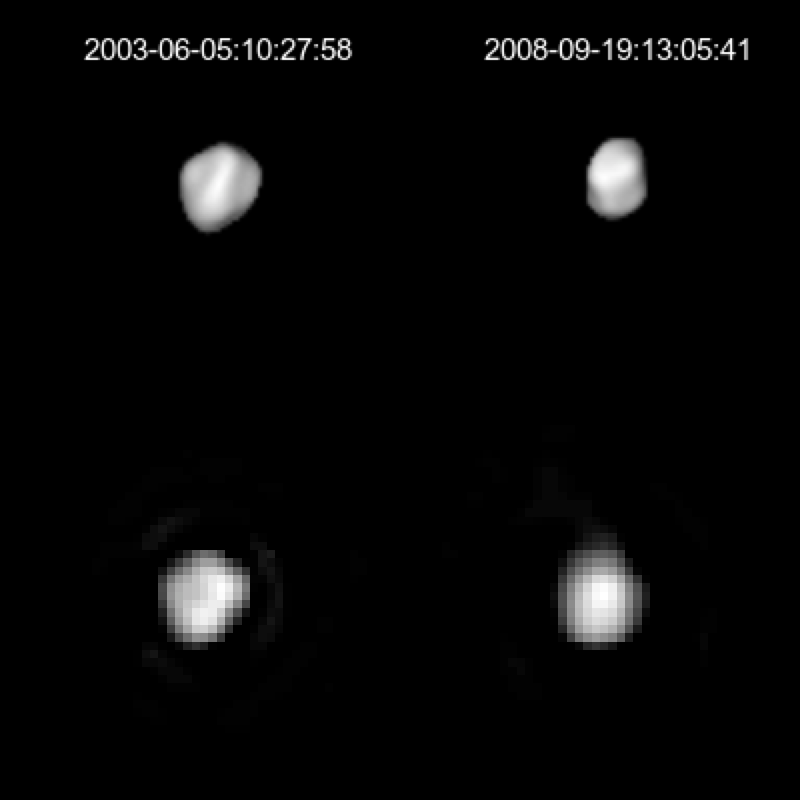
- Three-dimensional model of 56 Melete created based on light curve on the top with an image of the asteroid on the bottom.

Discovery
- Discovered by: Hermann Mayer Salomon Goldschmidt
- Discovery date: 9 September 1857

Designations
- Pronunciation: /ˈmɛlɪtiː/
- Named after: Melete
- Minor planet category: Main belt
- Adjectives: Meletean /mɛlɪˈtiːən/

Orbital characteristics
- Epoch 31 December 2006 (JD 2454100.5)
- Aphelion: 480.683 million km (3.213 AU)
- Perihelion: 295.717 million km (1.977 AU)
- Semi-major axis: 388.200 million km (2.595 AU)
- Eccentricity: 0.238
- Orbital period (sidereal): 1526.839 d (4.18 a)
- Mean anomaly: 267.781°
- Inclination: 8.072°
- Longitude of ascending node: 193.478°
- Argument of perihelion: 103.648°

Physical characteristics
- Mean diameter: 119 ± 5 km
- Mass: (1.33±0.28)×10^{18} kg (Note: Calculated from its standard gravitational parameter GM = 0.089±0.019 km^{3}/s^{2}.)
- Mean density: 1.51±0.37 g/cm^{3}
- Synodic rotation period: 18.14817 hr
- Pole ecliptic longitude: 103° ± 1°/283° ± 1°
- Pole ecliptic latitude: −26° ± 2°/−3° ± 3°
- Geometric albedo: 0.065
- Spectral type: P
- Absolute magnitude (H): 8.31

56 Melete is a large and dark main-belt asteroid. It is a rather unusual P-type asteroid, probably composed of organic-rich silicates, carbon and anhydrous silicates, with possible internal water ice. The asteroid orbits the Sun with a period of 4.18 years.

Melete was discovered by Hermann Goldschmidt from his balcony in Paris, on 9 September 1857. Its orbit was computed by E. Schubert, who named it after Melete, the Muse of meditation in Greek mythology. It was originally confused for 41 Daphne before it was confirmed not to be by its second sighting on 27 August 1871. In 1861, the brightness of 56 Melete was shown to vary by German astronomer Friedrich Tietjen.

Melete has been studied by radar. Photometric observations of this asteroid at the Palmer Divide Observatory in Colorado Springs, Colorado in 2007 gave a light curve with a period of 18.151 ± 0.002 hours and a brightness variation of 0.15 ± 0.02 in magnitude. This result is in agreement with a period of 18.1 hours independently reported in 1993 and 2007.

To date, two stellar occultations by Melete have been observed successfully (in 1997 and again in 2002).
