= 49 Pales =

Main-belt asteroid

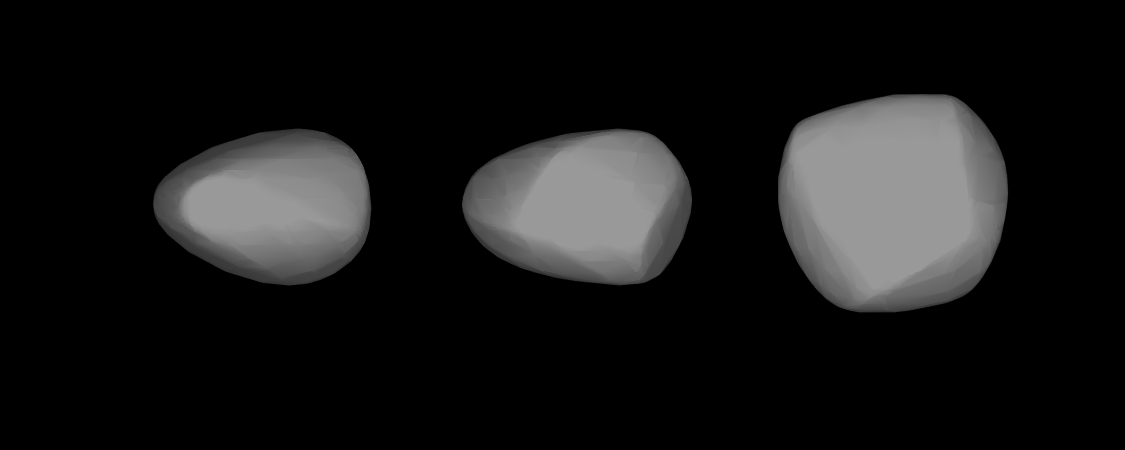
- A three-dimensional model of 49 Pales based on its lightcurve

Discovery
- Discovered by: Hermann Goldschmidt
- Discovery site: Paris Observatory
- Discovery date: 19 September 1857

Designations
- Designation: (49) Pales
- Pronunciation: /ˈpeɪliːz/
- Named after: Pales
- Minor planet category: Main belt
- Adjectives: Palian /ˈpeɪliən/; Palilian /pəˈlɪliən/ (adj. only)

Orbital characteristics
- Epoch 23 March 2018 (JD 2458200.5)
- Aphelion: 3.7989 AU
- Perihelion: 2.4030 AU
- Semi-major axis: 3.10093 AU
- Eccentricity: 0.22507
- Orbital period (sidereal): 1994.51 days (5.46 years)
- Mean anomaly: 169.53°
- Inclination: 3.17°
- Longitude of ascending node: 285.646°
- Argument of perihelion: 111.146°

Physical characteristics
- Mean diameter: 149.97±3.78 km (composite estimate); 149.80±3.8 km
- Mass: (2.86±0.27)×10^{18} kg (Note: Calculated from its standard gravitational parameter GM = 0.191±0.018 km^{3}/s^{2}.)
- Mean density: 1.19 g/cm^{3} (Note: Assuming a diameter of 166 km.)
- Synodic rotation period: 20.7057±0.0002 h; 20.705±0.002 h; 20.704±0.001 h
- Albedo: 0.0597±0.003
- Spectral type: C
- Absolute magnitude (H): 7.8

49 Pales (/ˈpeɪliːz/) is a large, dark main-belt asteroid. It was discovered by German-French astronomer Hermann Goldschmidt on 19 September 1857 from his balcony in Paris. The asteroid is named after Pales, the goddess of shepherds in Roman mythology. Since it was discovered on the same night as 48 Doris, geologist Élie de Beaumont suggested naming the two "The Twins".

The orbit of this asteroid has close to a 2:1 commensurability with the orbit of Jupiter. On 17 January 2000, this minor planet was observed occulting a 9th magnitude star from seven locations. These timed chords across the silhouette allowed an estimate to be made of the object's dimensions, yielding a cross-section of 251 km × 160 km.

Pales has been studied by radar. It has a rotation period of 20.705±0.002 h and a lightcurve with an amplitude of 0.18 mag. The lightcurve shows 4 maxima and 4 minima per cycle, suggesting an irregular shape. The previously accepted period of 10.42 hours with 2 maxima and minima per cycle was proven to be wrong by Pilcher in 2016, showing that correct rotation periods still have not been found for all low-numbered asteroids.
