= Lauriacum (crater) =

Asteroid crater

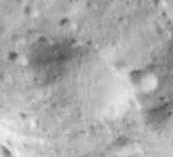
- An image of Lauriacum, captured by the Rosetta spacecraft in 2010
- Feature type: Crater
- Location: 21 Lutetia
- Coordinates: 37°N 0°E
- Diameter: 1.5 km (0.9 mi)
- Discoverer: via the Rosetta spacecraft, in c. July 2010
- Naming: 2 September 2011
- Eponym: Lauriacum

Lauriacum is a crater on the asteroid 21 Lutetia, a main-belt asteroid that was discovered via the Rosetta spacecraft in c. July 2010. The crater was named after Lauriacum, an important town at the time of Lutetia. The name "Lauriacum" was officially approved by the International Astronomical Union (IAU) on September 2nd, 2011.

== Geology and characteristics ==
Its coordinates are 37°N 0°E which makes it define zero degrees longitude on 21 Lutetia. It has an estimated diameter of 1.5 kilometers. (0.9 miles)

== See also ==
- List of geological features on 21 Lutetia
