= Hermann Goldschmidt =

German painter

Hermann Mayer Salomon Goldschmidt
- Born: June 17, 1802; Frankfurt, Germany
- Died: August 30, 1866 (aged 64); Fontainebleau, France
- Known for: discovery of the asteroid Lutetia
- Awards: Lalande Prize (1852, 1854, 1855, 1857, 1858, 1860, 1861); Gold Medal of the Royal Astronomical Society (1861)

Hermann Mayer Salomon Goldschmidt (June 17, 1802 – August 30 or September 10, 1866) was a German-French astronomer and painter who spent much of his life in France. He started out as a painter, but after attending a lecture by the famous French astronomer Urbain Le Verrier turned to astronomy. His discovery of the asteroid Lutetia in 1852 was followed by further findings and by 1861 Goldschmidt had discovered 14 asteroids. He received the Gold Medal of the Royal Astronomical Society in 1861 for having discovered more asteroids than any other person up to that time. He died from complications of diabetes.

== Life and work ==
Goldschmidt was born in Frankfurt as the son of a Jewish merchant. During a journey to the Netherlands, Goldschmidt visited Dutch picture galleries. The impression of this visit convinced him to become a painter. He studied art in Munich for several years under supervision of such famous painters as Peter von Cornelius and Julius Schnorr von Carolsfeld. To complete his education, in 1836 Goldschmidt went to Paris.

In 1820, Goldschmidt discovered shadow bands in total solar eclipses.

Several lectures on astronomy were planned for the occasion of the lunar eclipse of March 31, 1847. Urbain Le Verrier, discoverer of Neptune, held one in the Sorbonne. By pure chance, Goldshmidt attended this lecture, which awakened his interest in astronomy and led him to pursue it as a career.

Asteroids discovered: 14
| 21 Lutetia | November 15, 1852 |
| 32 Pomona | October 26, 1854 |
| 36 Atalante | October 5, 1855 |
| 40 Harmonia | March 31, 1856 |
| 41 Daphne | May 22, 1856 |
| 44 Nysa | May 27, 1857 |
| 45 Eugenia | June 27, 1857 |
| 48 Doris | September 19, 1857 |
| 49 Pales | September 19, 1857 |
| 52 Europa | February 4, 1858 |
| 54 Alexandra | September 10, 1858 |
| 56 Melete | September 9, 1857 |
| 61 Danaë | September 9, 1860 |
| 70 Panopaea | May 5, 1861 |

Goldschmidt bought a telescope with the diameter of 23 lines (52 millimeters (2.0 in)) with the money he got from selling two portraits of Galileo he painted during a stay in Florence. Goldschmidt set up the telescope in his apartment on the sixth floor above the Café Procope. Very soon he started updating the Star charts he had with new stars. During this work he observed the same area several times and was able to detect variable stars and moving objects like planets. He discovered his first new planet (today classified as asteroid) on November 15, 1852. Goldschmidt confirmed his observations with the help of François Arago at the Paris Observatory on November 18. Arago suggested the name Lutetium, based on the Latin name of Paris Lutetia used during the Roman occupation. The discovery of the new planet was published on November 23.

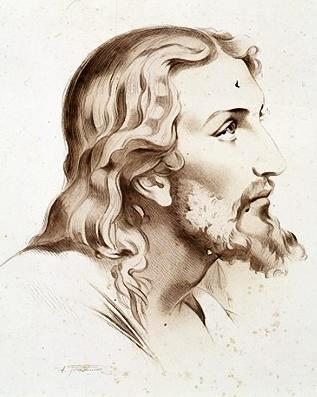
Portrait of Christ by Goldschmidt. Ink on paper. Date unknown

In subsequent years, Goldschmidt bought larger telescopes, one with 30 lines diameter. Despite the limited observational capabilities of his instrument, which was inferior to those of most of his competitors, by May 1856 Goldschmidt had discovered four more asteroids. His next telescope was one with the diameter of 4 inches (10 cm). This technical improvement enabled him to discover nine asteroids between May 1857 and May 1861. During that period, the Academy of Science awarded Goldschmidt the astronomical prize medal several times, and he was made a chevalier of the Légion d'honneur in 1857. By the time of his final discovery in May 1861, the Royal Astronomical Society had awarded him the Gold Medal of the Royal Astronomical Society for the discovery of 13 asteroids. At that point, the second most successful astronomers John Russell Hind and Robert Luther had each discovered 10.

Goldschmidt combined his abilities as a painter with his love for astronomy as exemplified by his paintings of the Great Comet of 1858 and of the solar eclipse he observed in Spain July 1860. In April 1861, he announced the discovery of a ninth moon of Saturn between Titan and Hyperion, which he named "Chiron". However, he was mistaken: this moon did not exist; today, "Chiron" is the name of an entirely different object, the unusual asteroid/comet 2060 Chiron. His updated star charts and the discovery of several variable stars were also appreciated by his colleagues.

Goldschmidt was never employed at the Paris Observatory and therefore his income was insecure. However, in 1862 he was awarded a pension of 1500 francs. Because of his diabetes, Goldschmidt moved to Fontainebleau, but his condition did not improve. He stayed in Fontainebleau for three years and, having lost his eyesight, he died there on August 26, 1866.

== Namesakes ==
The lunar crater Goldschmidt is named after him. The crater is located in the northern polar region.

The outer main-belt asteroid 1614 Goldschmidt, discovered by French astronomer Alfred Schmitt in 1952, was named in his memory.

== Prizes and awards ==
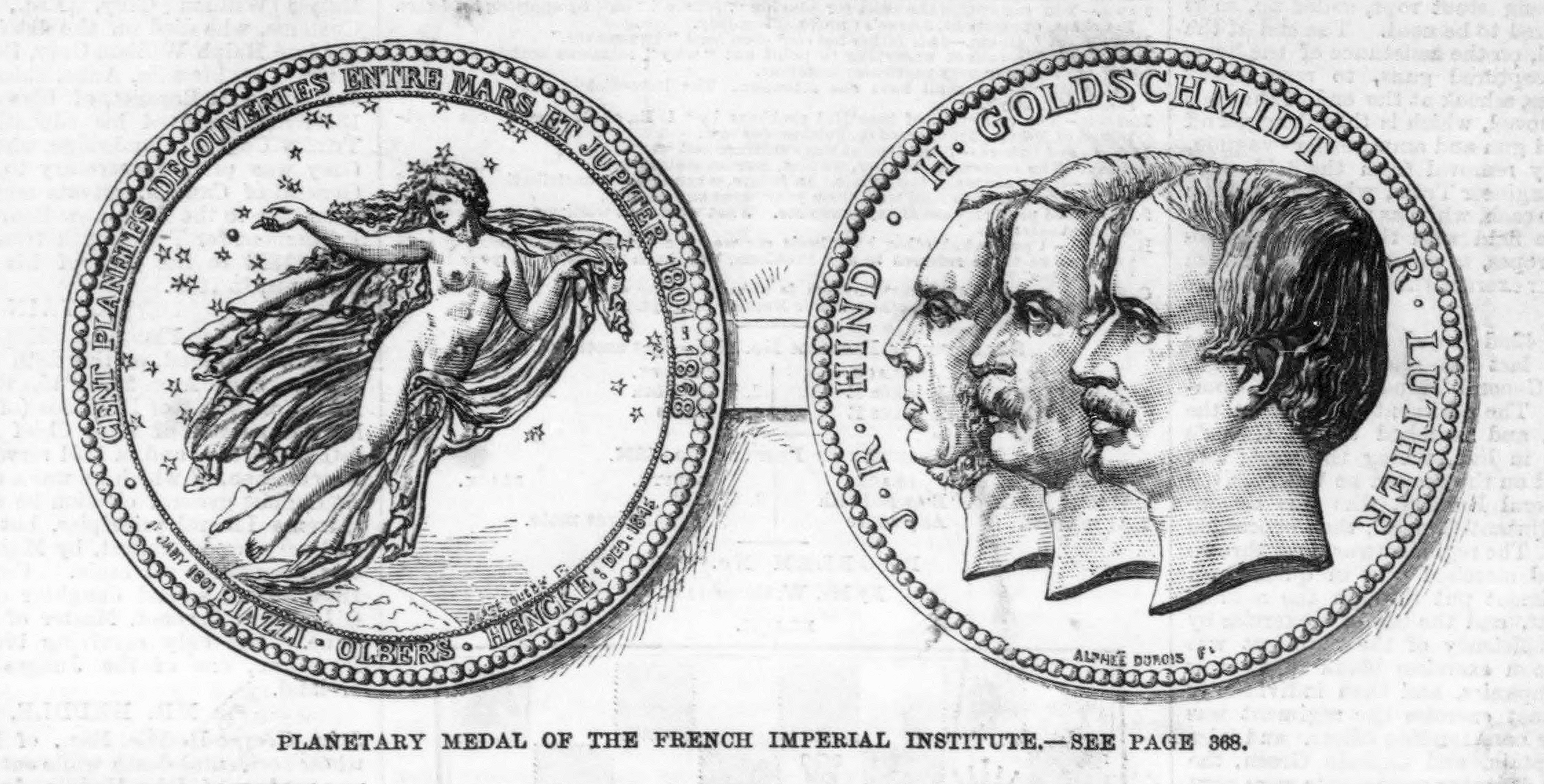
Royal Medal to commemorate the 100th Asteroid, showing Astronomers John Russell Hind, Hermann Goldschmidt and Robert Luther, 1869

Goldschmidt was awarded the Lalande Prize seven times (1852, 1854, 1855, 1857, 1858, 1860, 1861).

He was awarded chevalier of the Légion d'honneur in 1857.

In 1861, received Gold Medal of the Royal Astronomical Society for the discovery of 13 asteroids (at that time).

In 1869, a commemorative medal honoring the discovery of the 100th asteroid shows the profiles of John Russell Hind, Hermann Goldschmidt and Robert Luther.

== See also ==
- List of German painters
