= 36 Atalante =

Main-belt asteroid

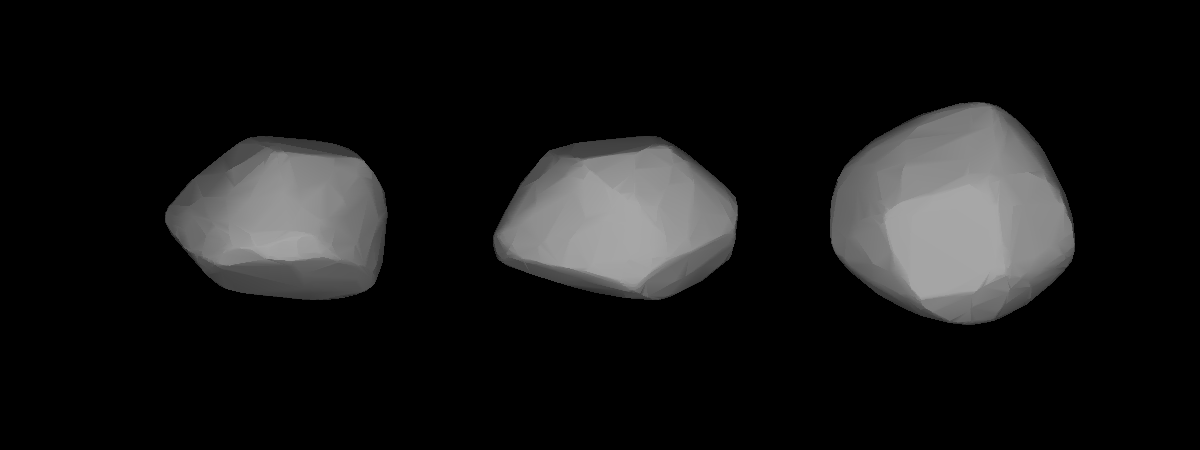
- Three-dimensional model of 36 Atalante created based on its light-curve

Discovery
- Discovered by: H. Goldschmidt
- Discovery date: 5 October 1855

Designations
- Designation: (36) Atalante
- Pronunciation: /ætəˈlæntə/ for Atalanta, /ætəˈlæntiː/ for Atalante (Note: The /ætəˈlæntiː/ pronunciation is for the Greek form Ἀταλάντη; however, the name Atalante here is actually the German form of the Latin Atalanta, with the German final -e being a schwa much like an English final -a – and indeed, 'Atalanta' is given as the English form in Craig (1869).)
- Named after: Atalanta
- Alternative names: A901 SB; A912 HC; Atalanta
- Minor planet category: Main belt
- Adjectives: Atalantean /ˌætəlænˈtiːən/

Orbital characteristics
- Epoch 31 December 2006 (JD 2454100.5)
- Aphelion: 535.625 million km (3.580 AU)
- Perihelion: 286.217 million km (1.913 AU)
- Semi-major axis: 410.921 million km (2.747 AU)
- Eccentricity: 0.303
- Orbital period (sidereal): 1662.831 d (4.55 a)
- Average orbital speed: 17.55 km/s
- Mean anomaly: 47.005°
- Inclination: 18.432°
- Longitude of ascending node: 358.472°
- Argument of perihelion: 47.132°

Physical characteristics
- Mean diameter: 132.842 ± 29.191 km 110.14 ± 4.38 km (composite estimate)
- Mass: (9.57 ± 4.32/3.15)×10^{17} kg (1.63±0.54)×10^{18} kg (Note: Calculated from its standard gravitational parameter GM = 0.109±0.036 km^{3}/s^{2}.)
- Mean density: 1.672 ± 0.755/0.551 g/cm^{3} (Note: Assuming a diameter of 103 ± 11.451 km.); 1.33 g/cm^{3} (Note: Assuming a diameter of 133 km.)
- Surface gravity: ~226.4664 m/s²
- Escape velocity: ~0.0498 km/s
- Synodic rotation period: 0.414 d (9.93 h)
- Albedo: 0.029
- Temperature: ~170 K
- Spectral type: C
- Absolute magnitude (H): 8.59

36 Atalante is a large, dark main-belt asteroid. It was discovered by the German-French astronomer H. Goldschmidt on 5 October 1855, and named by French mathematician Urbain Le Verrier after the Greek mythological heroine Atalanta (of which Atalante is the French and German form, pronounced nearly the same as 'Atalanta' in English). It was rendered 'Atalanta' in English sources in the 19th century. This asteroid is classified as C-type (carbonaceous), according to the Tholen classification system.

Observation of the asteroid light curve indicates it is rotating with a period of 9.93 ± 0.01 hours. During this interval, the magnitude varies by an amplitude of 0.12 ± 0.02. By combining the results of multiple light curves, the approximate ellipsoidal shape of the object can be estimated. It appears to be slightly elongated, being about 28.2% longer along one axis compared to the other two. Atalante was observed by Arecibo radar in October 2010.

This asteroid shares a mean-motion resonance with the planets Jupiter and Saturn. The computed Lyapunov time for this asteroid is only 4,000 years, indicating that it occupies a highly chaotic orbit that will change randomly over time because of gravitational perturbations of the planets. This is the shortest Lyapunov time of the first 100 named asteroids.
