= 61 Danaë =

Main-belt asteroid

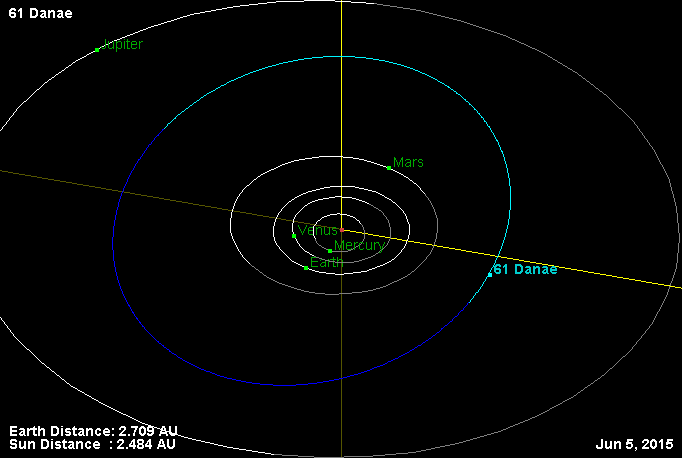

Discovery
- Discovered by: H. Goldschmidt
- Discovery site: Paris
- Discovery date: 9 September 1860

Designations
- Pronunciation: /ˈdæneɪ.iː/
- Named after: Danaë (Greek mythology)
- Alternative designations: 1953 RL_{1} · A917 SM
- Minor planet category: main-belt · (outer) background
- Adjectives: Danaëan /dæneɪˈiːən/

Orbital characteristics
- Epoch 4 September 2017 (JD 2458000.5)
- Uncertainty parameter 0
- Observation arc: 151.67 yr (55,398 days)
- Aphelion: 3.4798 AU
- Perihelion: 2.4840 AU
- Semi-major axis: 2.9819 AU
- Eccentricity: 0.1670
- Orbital period (sidereal): 5.15 yr (1,881 days)
- Mean anomaly: 157.11°
- Mean motion: 0° 11^{m} 29.04^{s} / day
- Inclination: 18.212°
- Longitude of ascending node: 333.72°
- Argument of perihelion: 12.695°

Physical characteristics
- Dimensions: 82.52±2.73 km (composite estimate) Individual estimates: 82.04±4.3 km; 83.56±1.02 km; 85.125±1.962 km; 85.937±2.151 km; 91.00±3.50 km
- Mass: (1.66±0.67)×10^{18} kg (Note: Calculated from its standard gravitational parameter GM = 0.111±0.045 km^{3}/s^{2}.)
- Mean density: 5.01 g/cm^{3} (Note: Assuming a diameter of 85.9 km.)
- Synodic rotation period: 11.45 h 11.547±0.001 h
- Geometric albedo: 0.181±0.034; 0.203±0.014; 0.2065±0.0472; 0.216±0.006; 0.2224±0.025
- Spectral type: Tholen = S SMASS = S B–V = 0.852; U–B = 0.402
- Absolute magnitude (H): 7.56±0.10 · 7.68 · 7.78±0.25

61 Danaë (/ˈdæneɪ.iː/) is a stony (S-type) asteroid in the outer asteroid belt's background population, approximately 84 kilometer in diameter. It was discovered by French astronomer Hermann Goldschmidt on 9 September 1860, from his balcony in Paris, France. Goldschmidt was ill when asked to name the asteroid, and requested his fellow asteroid-hunter Robert Luther to name it instead. Luther chose to name it after Danaë, the mother of Perseus in Greek mythology. Danaë was the first asteroid to have a diacritical character in its official name.

The asteroid is orbiting the Sun with a period of 5.15 years and is rotating on its axis once every 11.45 hours. In 1985, a study of lightcurve data suggested that Danaë may have a moon. If so, the main body would be an ellipsoid measuring 85 km × 80 km × 75 km (53 mi × 50 mi × 47 mi), and the moon would orbit 101 kilometres (63 mi) away, measuring 55 km × 30 km × 30 km (34 mi × 19 mi × 19 mi). The density of both would be 1.1 g/cm^{3}.
