= Grazing lunar occultation =

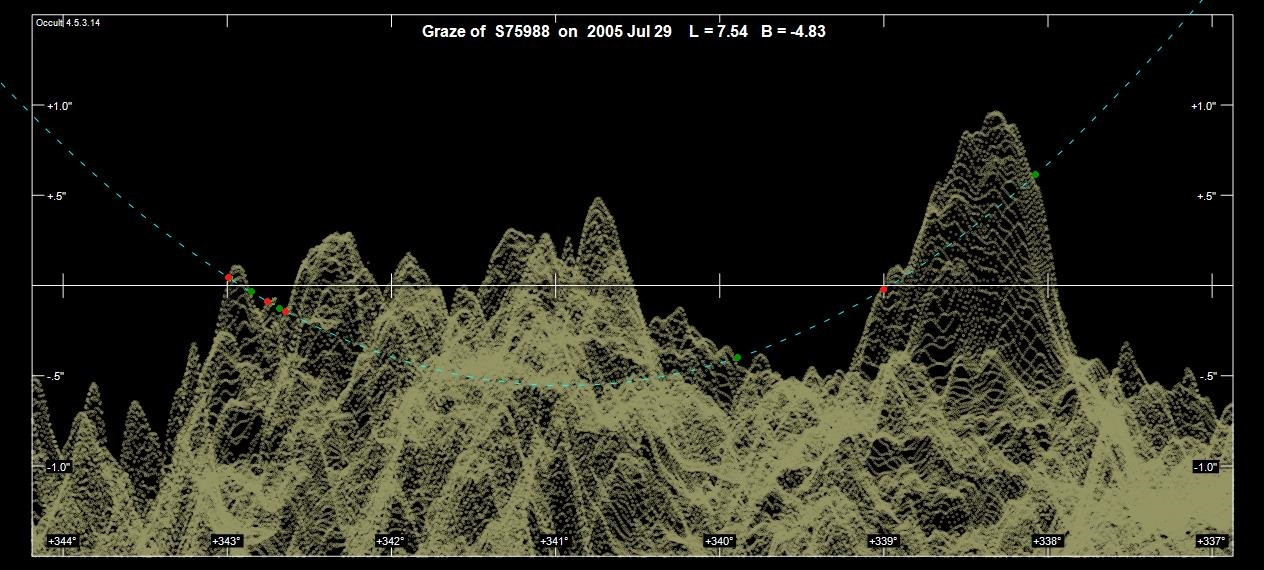
Figure 2: Observed events plotted on the limb topographical profile. It shows a plot of the results from a single observer graze expedition, where eight events were observed. The path of the star is shown curved, when in reality it is the moon moving past the star. The first disappearance is shown on the left (red) and the last reappearance on the right (green). The olive coloured dots are altitude soundings from the data points from the Kaguya lunar orbiter.

A grazing lunar occultation (also lunar grazing occultation, lunar graze, or just graze) is a lunar occultation in which the occulted star disappears and reappears intermittently on the edge of the Moon. A team of many observers can combine grazes and reconstruct an accurate profile of the limb lunar terrain.

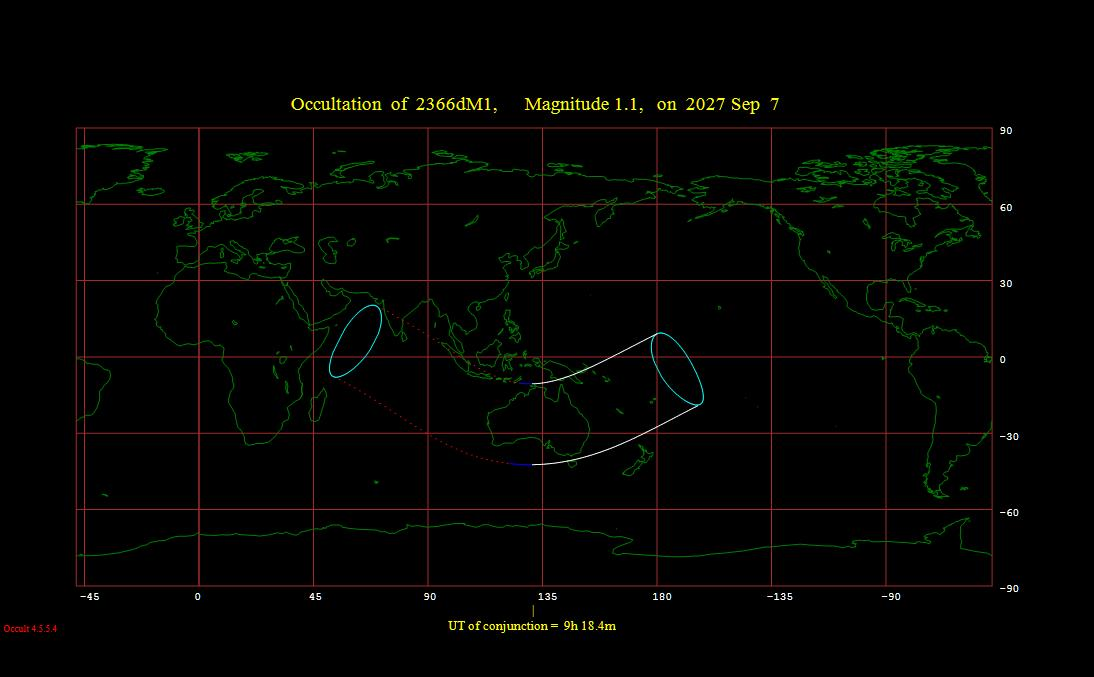
Figure 1: A map showing the path of the lunar shadow as it crosses the earth. In this case, the star is Antares and the predicted date is 2027 September 7th. The left (western) ellipse represents moonrise for that region of the globe. The right (eastern) ellipse represents moon set for that region. The northern and southern path limits are shown. In the example shown, weather conditions allowing, sites between the white lines will see the event at night; sites between the blue lines will see the event during twilight; and sites between the red dotted lines during the day-time for stars brighter than (of a number lower than) second magnitude (<+2 Apparent Magnitude).

Since graze paths rarely pass over established observatories, amateur astronomers use portable observing equipment and travel to sites along the shadow path limits. The goal is to report the UTC of each event as accurately as possible, and GPS disciplined devices are frequently used as the time-base. Two methods are used to observe:

- visual – the observer has an audible UTC beeping device (e.g. a shortwave radio tuned to WWV) and an audio recorder (e.g. a tape recorder) and watches the target through the telescope, and calls 'Gone' when the star disappears, and 'Back' when the star reappears. The audio recording is later analysed to extract the event times.
- video – the observer uses a small video camera, usually mounted in the focuser of the telescope. A Video Time Inserter (VTI) is commonly used to insert a UTC time-stamp onto each frame of the recording. Either a camcorder, DVR or a laptop computer is used to record the video stream. The video recording is later analysed to extract event times.

Such observations are useful for:

- refining knowledge of the positions and motions of stars
- examining limb topographical profile around the lunar polar region.
- Measurement of the Earth's rotation

== See also ==
- Asteroid occultation
- Occultation
- Transit (occultations of planets by other planets)
