= 48 Doris =

Main-belt asteroid

- VLT-SPHERE image of Doris

Discovery
- Discovered by: Hermann Mayer Salomon Goldschmidt
- Discovery date: 19 September 1857

Designations
- Pronunciation: /ˈdɔːrɪs/
- Named after: Doris
- Alternative designations: 1857 SA, 1948 FE
- Minor planet category: Main belt
- Adjectives: Dorian /ˈdɔːriən/

Orbital characteristics
- Epoch 31 December 2006 (JD 2454100.5)
- Aphelion: 500.093 million km (3.343 AU)
- Perihelion: 430.463 million km (2.877 AU)
- Semi-major axis: 465.278 million km (3.110 AU)
- Eccentricity: 0.075
- Orbital period (sidereal): 2003.453 d (5.49 a)
- Mean anomaly: 336.191°
- Inclination: 6.554°
- Longitude of ascending node: 183.754°
- Argument of perihelion: 257.583°

Physical characteristics
- Dimensions: (257 × 211 × 185) ± 3 km
- Mean diameter: 215±3 km
- Mass: (7.15±0.34)×10^{18} kg (2025) (Note: Calculated from its standard gravitational parameter GM = 0.477±0.023 km^{3}/s^{2}.) (6.71±0.85)×10^{18} kg (2023)
- Mean density: 1.37±0.09 g/cm^{3} (2025); 1.29±0.17 g/cm^{3} (2023)
- Synodic rotation period: 11.890105±0.000001 h
- Axial tilt: 45°
- Pole ecliptic longitude: 294° ± 2°
- Pole ecliptic latitude: 51° ± 2°
- Geometric albedo: 0.066; 0.065 ± 0.008; 0.062
- Spectral type: C
- Absolute magnitude (H): 6.90; 7.10

48 Doris is one of the largest main belt asteroids. It was discovered on 19 September 1857 by Hermann Goldschmidt from his balcony in Paris.

To find a name for the object, Jacques Babinet of the Academy of Sciences created a shortlist and asked the geologist Élie de Beaumont to make the selection. De Beaumont chose Doris, after an Oceanid in Greek mythology. Since Doris was discovered on the same night as 49 Pales, de Beaumont suggested naming the two "The Twins".

== Physical characteristics ==
An occultation on 19 March 1981 suggested a diameter of 219±25 km. Observations of an occultation on 14 October 1999, using four well-placed chords, indicate an ellipsoid of 278×142 km and that 48 Doris is an extremely irregularly shaped object.

Doris will pass within 0.019 AU of Pallas in June 2132.
