= 40 Harmonia =

Main-belt asteroid

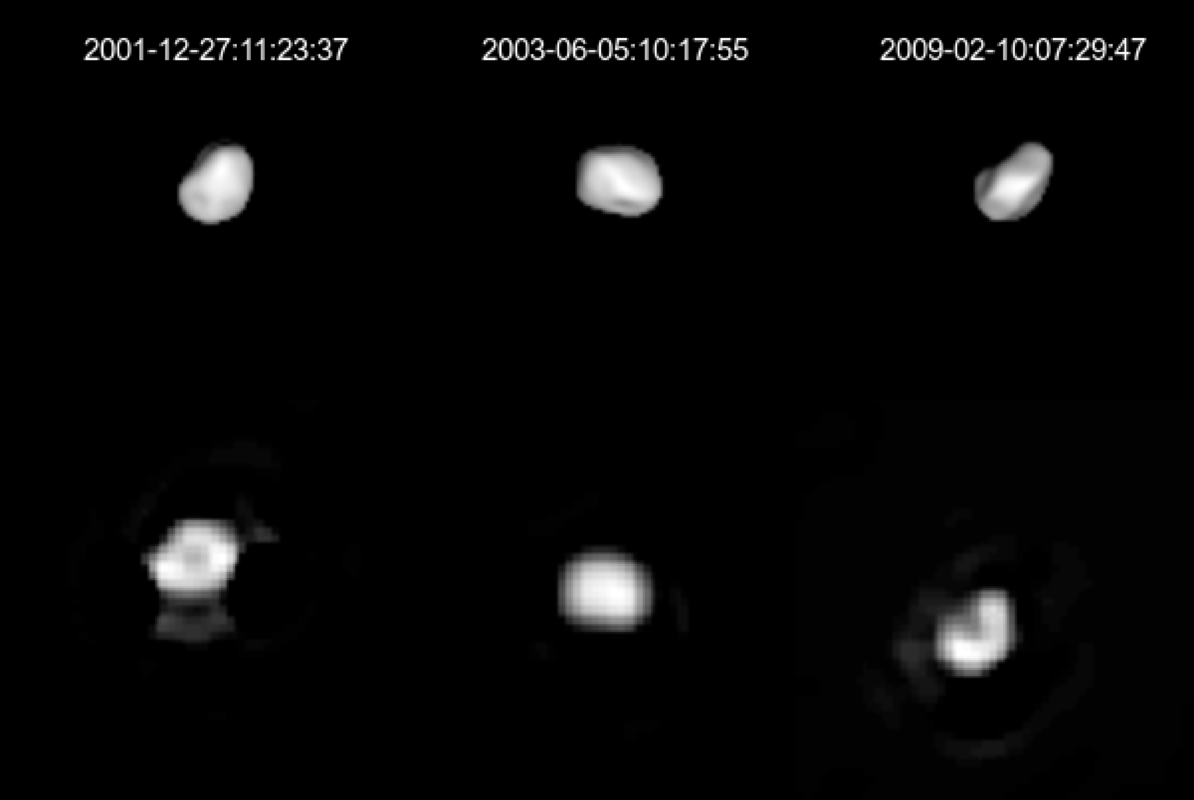
- A three-dimensional model of 40 Harmonia based on its light curve on the top and an image of 40 Harmonia on the bottom.

Discovery
- Discovered by: H. Goldschmidt
- Discovery date: 31 March 1856

Designations
- Pronunciation: /hɑːrˈmoʊniə/
- Named after: Harmonia
- Alternative designations: 1950 XU
- Minor planet category: Main belt

Orbital characteristics
- Epoch 31 December 2006 (JD 2454100.5)
- Aphelion: 355.021 million km (2.373 AU)
- Perihelion: 323.537 million km (2.163 AU)
- Semi-major axis: 339.279 million km (2.268 AU)
- Eccentricity: 0.046
- Orbital period (sidereal): 1,247.514 d (3.42 a)
- Mean anomaly: 249.120°
- Inclination: 4.256°
- Longitude of ascending node: 94.287°
- Argument of perihelion: 268.988°

Physical characteristics
- Mean diameter: 113 ± 7 km
- Mass: (2.038±0.090)×10^{18} kg (Note: Calculated from its standard gravitational parameter GM = 0.136±0.006 km^{3}/s^{2}.)
- Mean density: 2.70±0.51 g/cm^{3}
- Synodic rotation period: 0.3711869 d (8.908485 h)
- Pole ecliptic longitude: 22° ± 2°
- Pole ecliptic latitude: 38° ± 5°
- Geometric albedo: 0.242
- Spectral type: S
- Apparent magnitude: 9.31 (brightest)
- Absolute magnitude (H): 6.55

40 Harmonia is a large main-belt asteroid. It was discovered by German-French astronomer Hermann Goldschmidt on 31 March 1856, and named after Harmonia, the Greek goddess of harmony. The name was chosen to mark the end of the Crimean War.

The asteroid is orbiting the Sun with a period of 3.42 years and a relatively low eccentricity of 0.046. It has a cross-sectional size of 107.6 km. The spectrum of 40 Harmonia matches an S-type (silicate) in the Tholen classification system, and is similar to primitive achondrite meteorites. Photometric observations at the Organ Mesa Observatory in Las Cruces, New Mexico during 2008–09 were used to generate a light curve that showed four unequal minima and maxima per cycle. The curve shows a period of 8.909 ± 0.001 hours with a brightness variation of 0.28 ± 0.02 in magnitude. This result is compatible with previous studies.

Speckle interferometric observations carried out with the Nicholas U. Mayall Telescope at the Kitt Peak National Observatory during 1982–84 failed to discover a satellite companion. In 1988 a search for satellites or dust orbiting this asteroid was performed using the UH88 telescope at the Mauna Kea Observatories, but the effort came up empty.
