= Lunar occultation of Venus =

Astronomical phenomenon of Lunar Occultation of Venus

Lunar Occultation of Venus
- Lunar Occultation of Venus on 18th June in 2007

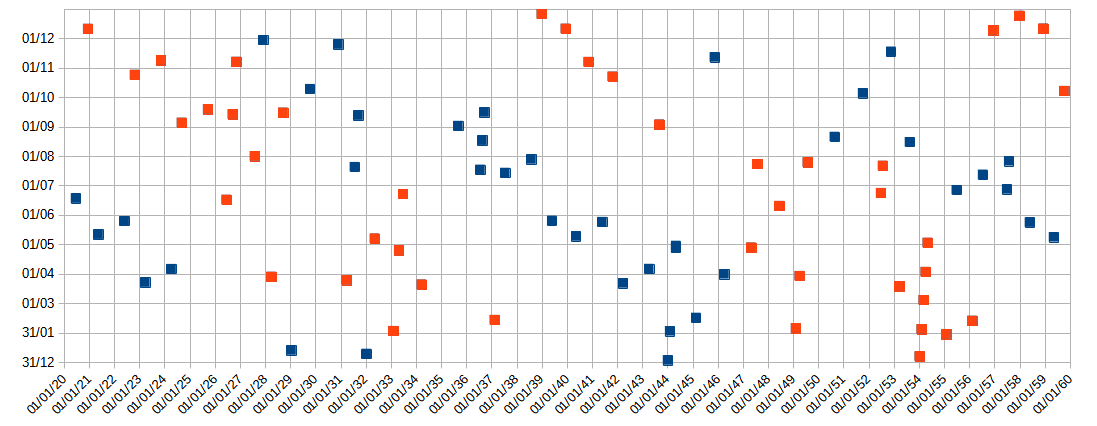
Probable lunar occultations of Venus, 2020 to 2060. These are calculated by a simple method that may include some near occultations. The blue points represent occultations closer to the moon's ascending node while the red are closer to the descending node. Note the series of five in 2054, which have been checked.

The lunar occultation of Venus refers to a natural phenomenon in which the Moon passes in front of Venus, obstructing it from view on some regions of the Earth. Since the orbital planes of both the moon and Venus are tilted relative to the ecliptic, occultations only happen about twice a year rather than once a month. A computer search predicts that 101 lunar occultations occur in the date range of 1995–2045.

Occultations can occur at any value of the moon's argument of latitude, not just near its nodes, because Venus goes further north and south of the ecliptic than the moon does. In 2054 for example there are five occultations at intervals of just one month (January through May), and the first two are when Venus is more than 5.1° north of the ecliptic.

Whether there is an occultation depends on whether the distance of the centre of the moon is greater or less than 8093 kilometres (the sum of the earth's polar radius and the moon's radius) away from the line connecting the centre of the earth to Venus. The angle between the lines from the centre of the earth to the centres of the moon and Venus will then be the arc sine of 8093 km divided by the distance to the moon. Since this distance can vary in the range of 356,400 to 406,700 kilometres, there will always be an occultation (of the centre of Venus) if the said angle is less than 1.14° and there will never be one if the angle is more than 1.30°. Venus itself can have an angular radius up to nearly 0.01°, which needs to be taken into account when determining whether all of Venus will be hidden. This is similar to considerations of gamma for solar eclipses.

For years up to 2025, a website giving easily observable occultations for the year is available.

== Observations ==
Year	Observation
−124	A Babylonian scribe reported observing Venus disappear behind the Moon on 4 September 125 BC. However, this report is considered unreliable as the occultation supposedly occurred an hour and 20 minutes after sunrise and the report does not agree well with ΔT determinations at similar times in the past.
63	The eclipse on 5 November 63 as viewed from Rome may be referenced in the Book of Revelation.
503	The Chinese Book of Wei records the lunar occultation of Venus on 5 August 503.
554	Medieval sources in Metz record a lunar occultation of Venus at around this time. The most likely date was 9 October 554.
1476	Castilian astronomer Abraham Zacuto made a detailed report of a lunar occultation of Venus on 24 July 1476.
1529	Renaissance polymath Nicolaus Copernicus observed the Moon occult Venus on 12 March 1529, and he used this and records of occultations from antiquity to deduce the motion of Venus.
1757	A near simultaneous occultation of Mars and Venus occurred 18 March 1757. The two planets had an angular separation of 25′.
1923	On 13 January 1923, a lunar occultation of Venus was photographed from the United States.
1980	From the British Isles on 5 October 1980, a rare lunar eclipse sequence of Venus and the star Regulus was viewed by multiple observers.
1998	On 23 April 1998, there was a near simultaneous lunar occultation of Venus and Jupiter. However, most of the event was only observable from the South Atlantic Ocean.
2007	The Venus Express spacecraft was in orbit around Venus when a lunar occultation was observed on 18 July 2007. Scientists used the radio transmissions to measure the electron density in the Moon's ionosphere.
2015	On the 7 December 2015, the lunar occultation of Venus was observed by astronomers in Texas. Similarly, Joel Kowsky, the astronomer of NASA recorded the lunar occultation of Venus the same day from Washington, D.C. The lunar occultation of Venus on this date was the second lunar occultation of the Venus in the same year.
2020	Venus was eclipsed by the Moon at 19 June 2020 from 9:44:15 - 10:46:12 PM (UTC+2).
2021	In the year 2021, Venus was occultated on 8 November. The occultation was observed from the Eastern part of Asia.
2023	On 24 March 2023, there was a lunar occultation viewed from Taiwan. On 9 November 2023, there was a lunar occultation observed from Europe.
2026	On 17 June 2026 there was an occultation of Venus visible in daylight the contiguous US, part of Canada and Mexico, Caribbean and NE South America, the latter after sunset.
2053	A near simultaneous lunar occultation of Venus and Uranus is predicted for 16 August 2053.
