= 70 Panopaea =

Main-belt asteroid

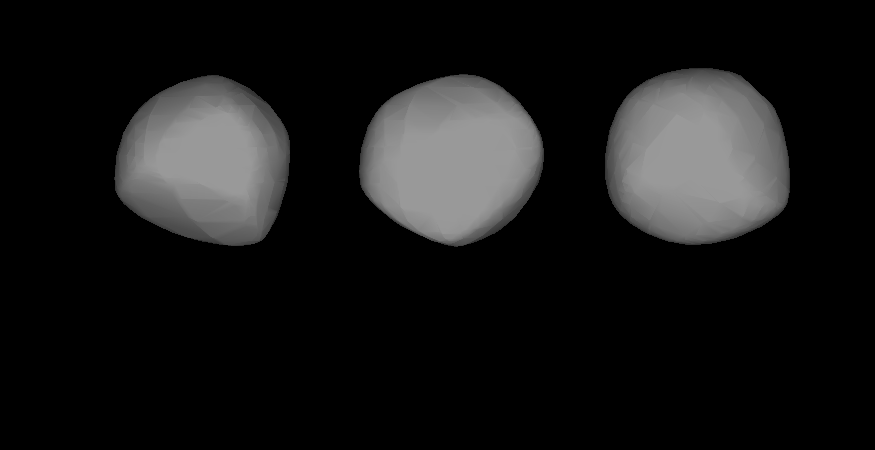
- A 3D model of 70 Panopaea based on its lightcurve

Discovery
- Discovered by: Hermann Mayer Salomon Goldschmidt
- Discovery site: Paris Observatory
- Discovery date: 5 May 1861

Designations
- Pronunciation: /pænəˈpiːə/
- Named after: Panopea
- Minor planet category: main belt
- Adjectives: Panopaean

Orbital characteristics
- Epoch 30 November 2008
- Aphelion: 3.0903 AU
- Perihelion: 2.1402 AU
- Semi-major axis: 2.61526 AU
- Eccentricity: 0.181641
- Orbital period (sidereal): 1544.79 days (4.23 years)
- Mean anomaly: 264.193°
- Inclination: 11.584°
- Longitude of ascending node: 47.783°
- Argument of perihelion: 256.016°

Physical characteristics
- Mean diameter: 128 ± 7 km (pole solution 1); 128+7 −11 km (pole solution 2)
- Mass: (1.75±0.25)×10^{18} kg (Note: Calculated from its standard gravitational parameter GM = 0.117±0.017 km^{3}/s^{2}.)
- Mean density: 1.61 g/cm^{3}
- Synodic rotation period: 15.80440 ± 0.00002 h (pole solution 1); 15.80439 ± 0.00001 h (pole solution 2)
- Pole ecliptic longitude: 42° ± 5° or 240° ± 6°
- Pole ecliptic latitude: 27° ± 3° or 26° ± 4°
- Geometric albedo: 0.0675 ± 0.003
- Spectral type: C
- Absolute magnitude (H): 8.11

70 Panopaea is a large main belt asteroid. Its orbit is close to those of the Eunomia asteroid family; however, Panopaea is a dark, primitive carbonaceous C-type asteroid in contrast to the S-type asteroids of the Eunomian asteroids. The spectra of the asteroid displays evidence of aqueous alteration. Photometric studies give a rotation period of 15.797 hours and an amplitude of 0.11±0.01 in magnitude. Previous studies that suggested the rotation period may be twice this amount were rejected based upon further observation.

Panopaea was discovered by Hermann Goldschmidt on 5 May 1861. It was his fourteenth and last asteroid discovery. It is named after Panopea, a nymph in Greek mythology; the name was chosen by Robert Main, President of the Royal Astronomical Society. In 1862, Swedish astronomer Nils Christoffer Dunér gave a doctoral thesis on the orbital elements of this asteroid.

The orbit of 70 Panopaea places it in a mean motion resonance with the planets Jupiter and Saturn. The computed Lyapunov time for this asteroid is 24,000 years, indicating that it occupies a chaotic orbit that will change randomly over time because of gravitational perturbations of the planets.

The asteroid frequently makes close approaches with 16 Psyche, such as on 12 June 2040 when it will make a close approach of 0.00602 AU (2.34 Lunar distances, or approx. 770,000 km, 478,455 mi) to the asteroid, and on 2 June 2095 when it will come only 0.003372 AU (1.31 LD) to the asteroid.
