= Lyapunov time =

Timescale of dynamical systems

In mathematics, the Lyapunov time is the characteristic timescale on which a dynamical system is chaotic. It is named after the Russian mathematician Aleksandr Lyapunov. It is defined as the inverse of a system's largest Lyapunov exponent.

== Use ==
The Lyapunov time mirrors the limits of the predictability of the system. By convention, it is defined as the time for the distance between nearby trajectories of the system to increase by a factor of e. However, measures in terms of 2-foldings and 10-foldings are sometimes found, since they correspond to the loss of one bit of information or one digit of precision respectively.

While it is used in many applications of dynamical systems theory, it has been particularly used in celestial mechanics where it is important for the problem of the stability of the Solar System. However, empirical estimation of the Lyapunov time is often associated with computational or inherent uncertainties.

== Examples ==
Typical values are:

System	Lyapunov time
Pluto's orbit	20 million years
Solar System	5 million years
Axial tilt of Mars	1–5 million years
Orbit of 36 Atalante	4,000 years
Rotation of Hyperion	36 days
Chemical chaotic oscillations	5.4 minutes
Hydrodynamic chaotic oscillations	2 seconds
1 cm^{3} of argon at room temperature	3.7×10^{−11} seconds
1 cm^{3} of argon at triple point (84 K, 69 kPa)	3.7×10^{−16} seconds

== See also ==
- Belousov–Zhabotinsky reaction
- Molecular chaos
- Three-body problem
