= 21 Lutetia =

Main-belt asteroid

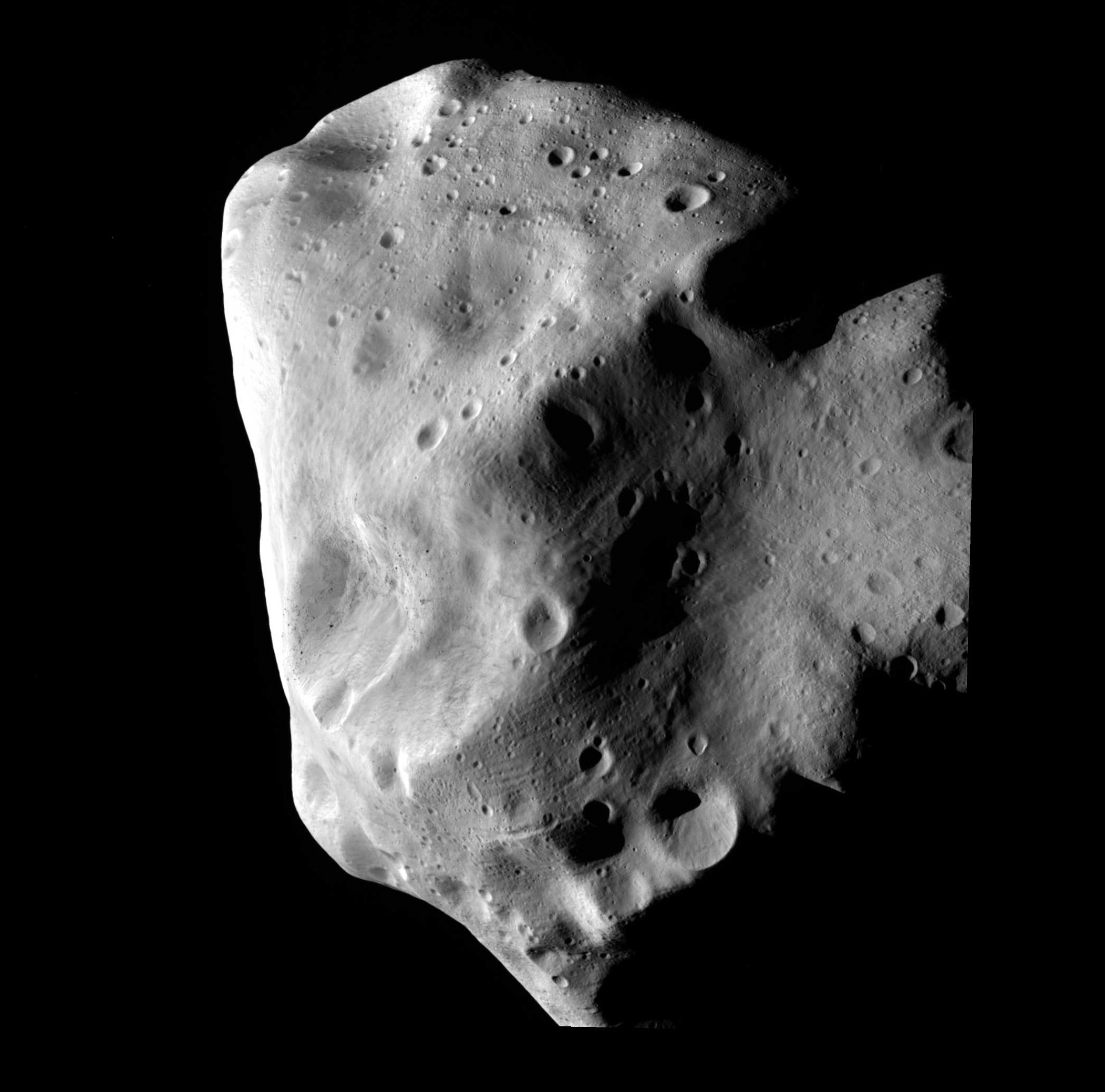
- Rosetta image of 21 Lutetia at closest approach. Asteroid not fully shown

Discovery
- Discovered by: Hermann M. S. Goldschmidt
- Discovery date: 15 November 1852

Designations
- Pronunciation: /ljuːˈtiːʃiə/
- Named after: Paris (Latin: Lutētia)
- Minor planet category: Main belt
- Adjectives: Lutetian

Orbital characteristics
- Epoch May 31, 2020 (JD 2459000.5)
- Aphelion: 2.833 AU (423.8 million km)
- Perihelion: 2.037 AU (304.7 million km)
- Semi-major axis: 2.435 AU (364.3 million km)
- Eccentricity: 0.16339
- Orbital period (sidereal): 3.80 yr (1388.1 d)
- Mean anomaly: 87.976°
- Inclination: 3.064°
- Longitude of ascending node: 80.867°
- Time of perihelion: 30 January 2027
- Argument of perihelion: 249.997°

Physical characteristics
- Dimensions: (121±1) × (101±1) × (75±13) km
- Mean radius: 49±1 km
- Volume: (5.0±0.4)×10^{14} m^{3}
- Mass: (1.700±0.017)×10^{18} kg
- Mean density: 3.4±0.3 g/cm^{3}
- Synodic rotation period: 0.3402 d (8.1655 h)
- Axial tilt: 96°
- North pole right ascension: 51.8 ± 0.4°
- North pole declination: +10.8 ± 0.4°
- Geometric albedo: 0.19 ± 0.01 (geometrical); 0.073 ± 0.002 (bond)
- Temperature: 170–245 K
- Spectral type: M (Tholen)
- Apparent magnitude: 9.25 to 13.17
- Absolute magnitude (H): 7.29

21 Lutetia is a large M-type asteroid in the main asteroid belt. It measures about 100 kilometers in diameter (120 km along its major axis). It was discovered in 1852 by Hermann Goldschmidt, and is named after Lutetia, the Latin name of the city of Paris.

Lutetia has an irregular shape and is heavily cratered, with the largest impact crater reaching 45 km in diameter. The surface is geologically heterogeneous and is intersected by a system of grooves and scarps, which are thought to be fractures. It has a high overall bulk density, suggesting that it is made of metal-rich rock.

The Rosetta probe passed within 3,162 km (1,965 mi) of Lutetia in July 2010. It was the largest asteroid visited by a spacecraft until Dawn arrived at Vesta in July 2011, and it is currently the 3rd largest asteroid to have ever been imaged in high quality by a spacecraft (after Vesta and Ceres).

== Discovery and exploration ==
Animation of Rosetta's trajectory from 2 March 2004 to 9 September 2016 Rosetta · 67P/Churyumov–Gerasimenko · Earth · Mars · 21 Lutetia · 2867 Šteins

Lutetia was discovered on 15 November 1852, by Hermann Goldschmidt from the balcony of his apartment in Paris. A preliminary orbit for the asteroid was computed in November–December 1852 by German astronomer Georg Rümker and others. In 1903, it was photographed at opposition by Edward Pickering at Harvard College Observatory. He computed an opposition magnitude of 10.8.

There have been two reported stellar occultations by Lutetia, observed from Malta in 1997 and Australia in 2003, with only one chord each, roughly agreeing with IRAS measurements.

On 10 July 2010, the European Rosetta space probe flew by Lutetia at a minimum distance of 3168 ± 7.5 km at a velocity of 15 kilometres per second on its way to the comet 67P/Churyumov-Gerasimenko. The flyby provided images of up to 60 meters per pixel resolution and covered about 50% of the surface, mostly in the northern hemisphere. The 462 images were obtained in 21 narrow- and broad-band filters extending from 0.24 to 1 μm. Lutetia was also observed by the visible–near-infrared imaging spectrometer VIRTIS, and measurements of the magnetic field and plasma environment were taken as well.

Based on the rare high-resolution images captured during the flyby, a photogrammetric model was reconstructed to simulate a complete trajectory around Lutetia. This animation is available in two versions: a standard 2D version and a stereoscopic version, allowing for a detailed appreciation of the asteroid's relief.

== Characteristics ==
=== Orbit ===
Lutetia orbits the Sun at the distance of approximately 2.4 AU in the inner asteroid belt. Its orbit lies almost in the plane of ecliptic and is moderately eccentric. The orbital period of Lutetia is 3.8 years.

=== Mass and density ===
The Rosetta flyby demonstrated that the mass of Lutetia is (1.700 ± 0.017)×10^{18} kg, smaller than the pre-flyby estimate of 2.57×10^{18} kg. It has one of the highest densities seen in asteroids at 3.4 ± 0.3 g/cm^{3}. Taking into account possible porosity of 10–15%, the bulk density of Lutetia exceeds that of a typical stony meteorite.

=== Composition ===
Lutetia is classified among the enigmatic M-type asteroids, most of which were historically believed to be nearly purely metallic. However, radar observations of the M-types suggest that two-thirds of them, including Lutetia, may instead consist of metal-enriched silicates. Indeed, telescopic spectra of Lutetia have shown a flat, low frequency spectrum similar to that of carbonaceous chondrites and C-type asteroids and unlike metallic meteorites, evidence of hydrated minerals, abundant silicates, and a thicker regolith than most asteroids.

The Rosetta probe found that the asteroid has a moderately red spectrum in visible light and an essentially flat spectrum in the near infrared. No absorption features were detected in the range covered by observations, 0.4–3.5 μm, which is at odds with previous ground-based reports of hydrated minerals and carbon-rich compounds. There was also no evidence of olivine. However, the spacecraft only observed half of Lutetia, so the existence of these phases cannot be completely ruled out. Together with the high bulk density reported for Lutetia, these results suggest that Lutetia is either made of enstatite chondrite material, or may be related to metal-rich and water-poor carbonaceous chondrite of classes like CB, CH, or CR.

Rosetta observations revealed that the surface of Lutetia is covered with a regolith made of loosely aggregated dust particles 50–100 μm in size. It is estimated to be 3 km thick and may be responsible for the softened outlines of many of the larger craters.

=== Shape and axial tilt ===
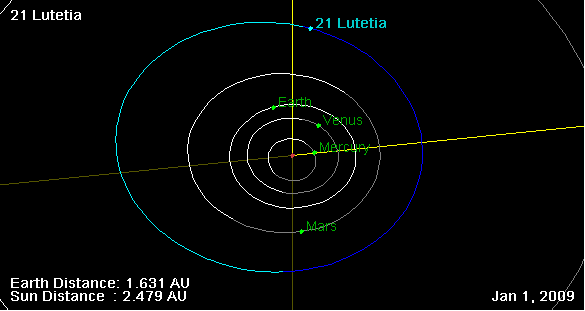
21 Lutetia's orbit, and its position on 1 January 2009 (NASA Orbit Viewer applet)

The Rosetta probe's photographs confirmed the results of a 2003 lightcurve analysis that described Lutetia as a rough sphere with "sharp and irregular shape features". A study from 2004 to 2009 proposed that Lutetia has a non-convex shape, likely because of a large crater, Suspicio Crater. It is not yet clear whether Rosetta's findings support this claim.

The analysis of Rosetta images in combination with photometric light curves yielded the position of the north rotational pole of Lutetia: RA = 51.8°±0.4°, Dec = +10.8°±0.4°. This gives an axial tilt of 96° (retrograde rotator), meaning that the axis of rotation is approximately parallel to the ecliptic, similar to the planet Uranus.

== Surface features ==
The surface of Lutetia is covered by numerous impact craters and intersected by fractures, scarps and grooves thought to be surface manifestations of internal fractures. On the imaged hemisphere of the asteroid there are a total of 350 craters with diameters ranging from 600 m to 55 km. The most heavily cratered surfaces (in Achaia region) have a crater retention age of about 3.6 ± 0.1 billion years.

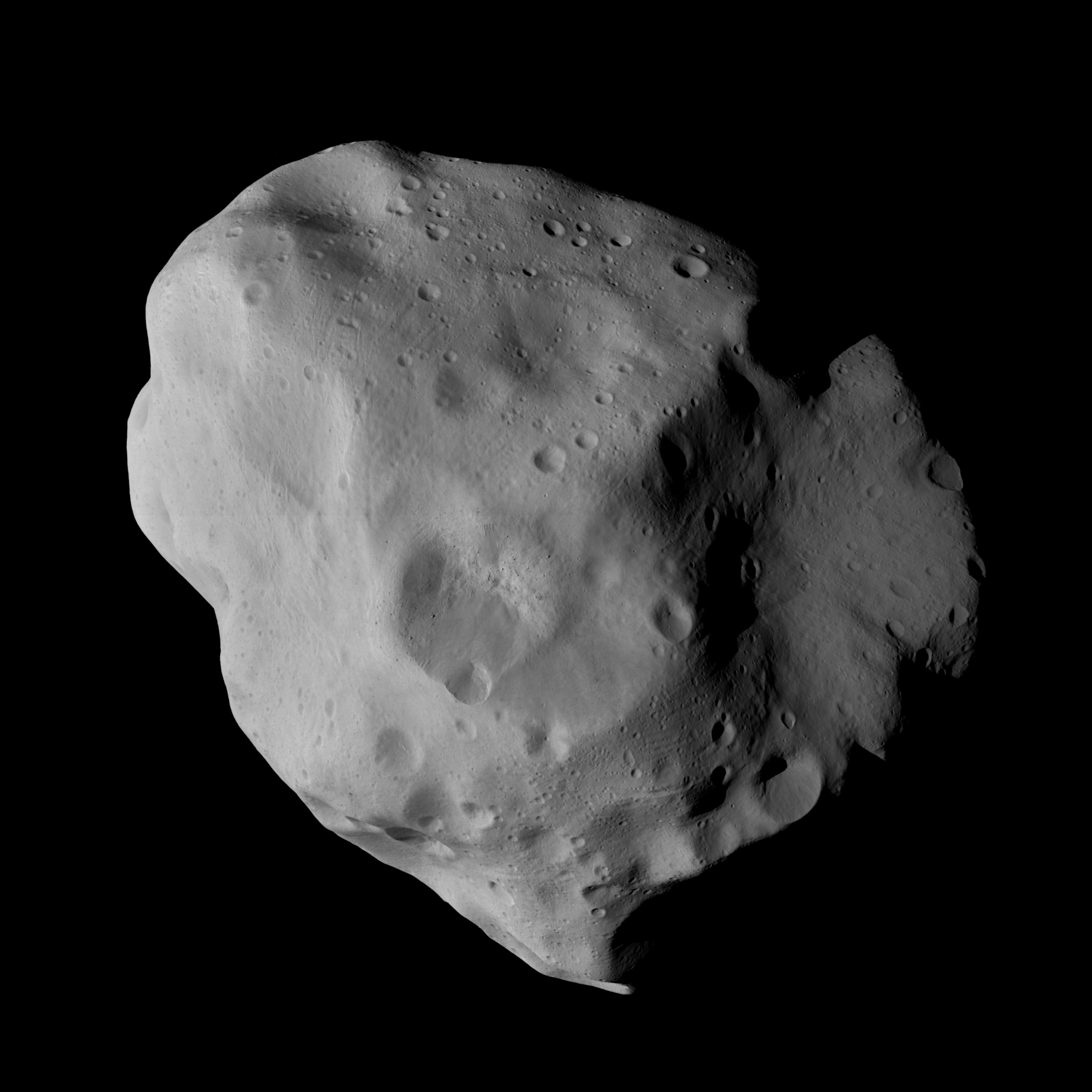
The surface of 21 Lutetia

The surface of Lutetia has been divided into seven regions based on their geology. They are Baetica (Bt), Achaia (AC), Etruria (Et), Narbonensis (Nb), Noricum (Nr), Pannonia (Pa), and Raetia (Ra). The Baetica region is situated around the north pole (in the center of the image) and includes a cluster of impact craters 21 km in diameter as well as their impact deposits. It is the youngest surface unit on Lutetia. Baetica is covered by a smooth ejecta blanket approximately 600 m thick that has partially buried older craters. Other surface features include landslides, gravitational taluses and ejecta blocks up to 300 m in size. The landslides and corresponding rock outcrops are correlated with variations of albedo, being generally brighter.

The two oldest regions are Achaia and Noricum. The former is a remarkably flat area with a lot of impact craters. The Narbonensis region coincides with the largest impact crater on Lutetia—Massilia. It includes a number of smaller units and is modified by pit chains and grooves formed at a later epoch. Other two regions—Pannonia and Raetia are also likely to be large impact craters. The last Noricum region is intersected by a prominent groove 10 km in length and about 100 m deep.

The numerical simulations showed that even the impact that produced the largest crater on Lutetia, which is 45 km in diameter, seriously fractured but did not shatter the asteroid. So, Lutetia has likely survived intact from the beginning of the Solar System. The existence of linear fractures and the impact crater morphology also indicate that the interior of this asteroid has a considerable strength and is not a rubble pile like many smaller asteroids. Taken together, these facts suggest that Lutetia should be classified as a primordial planetesimal.

=== Suspicio Crater ===
Studies of patterns of fractures on Lutetia lead astronomers to think that there is a ~45 kilometer impact crater on the southern side of Lutetia, named Suspicio Crater, but because Rosetta only observed Lutetia's northern part, it is not known for certain what it looks like, or if it exists at all.

== Nomenclature ==
This animation is an artist's impression of a possible scenario to explain how Lutetia came to now be located in the asteroid belt

In March 2011, the Working Group for Planetary Nomenclature at the International Astronomical Union agreed on a naming scheme for geographical features on Lutetia. Since Lutetia was a Roman city, the asteroid's craters are named after cities of the Roman Empire and the adjacent parts of Europe during the time of Lutetia's existence. Its regions are named after the discoverer of Lutetia (Goldschmidt) and after provinces of the Roman Empire at the time of Lutetia. Other features are named after rivers of the Roman Empire and the adjacent parts of Europe at the time of the city.

== Origin ==
The composition of Lutetia suggests that it formed in the inner Solar System among the terrestrial planets, and was ejected into the asteroid belt through an interaction with one of them.
