= Occultation =

When an object is hidden behind another

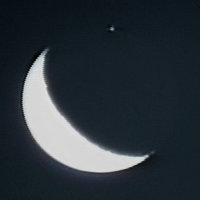
In this July 1997 still frame captured from video, the bright star Aldebaran has just reappeared on the dark limb of the waning crescent moon in this predawn occultation.

An occultation is an event that occurs when one object is hidden from the observer by another object that passes between them. The term is often used in astronomy, but can also refer to any situation in which an object in the foreground blocks from view (occults) an object in the background. In this general sense, occultation applies to the visual scene observed from low-flying aircraft (or computer-generated imagery) when foreground objects obscure distant objects dynamically, as the scene changes over time.

If the closer body does not entirely conceal the farther one, the event is called a transit. Both transit and occultation may be referred to generally as occlusion; and if a shadow is cast onto the observer, it is called an eclipse.

The symbol for an occultation, and especially a solar eclipse, is (U+1F775 🝵).

== Occultations by the Moon ==
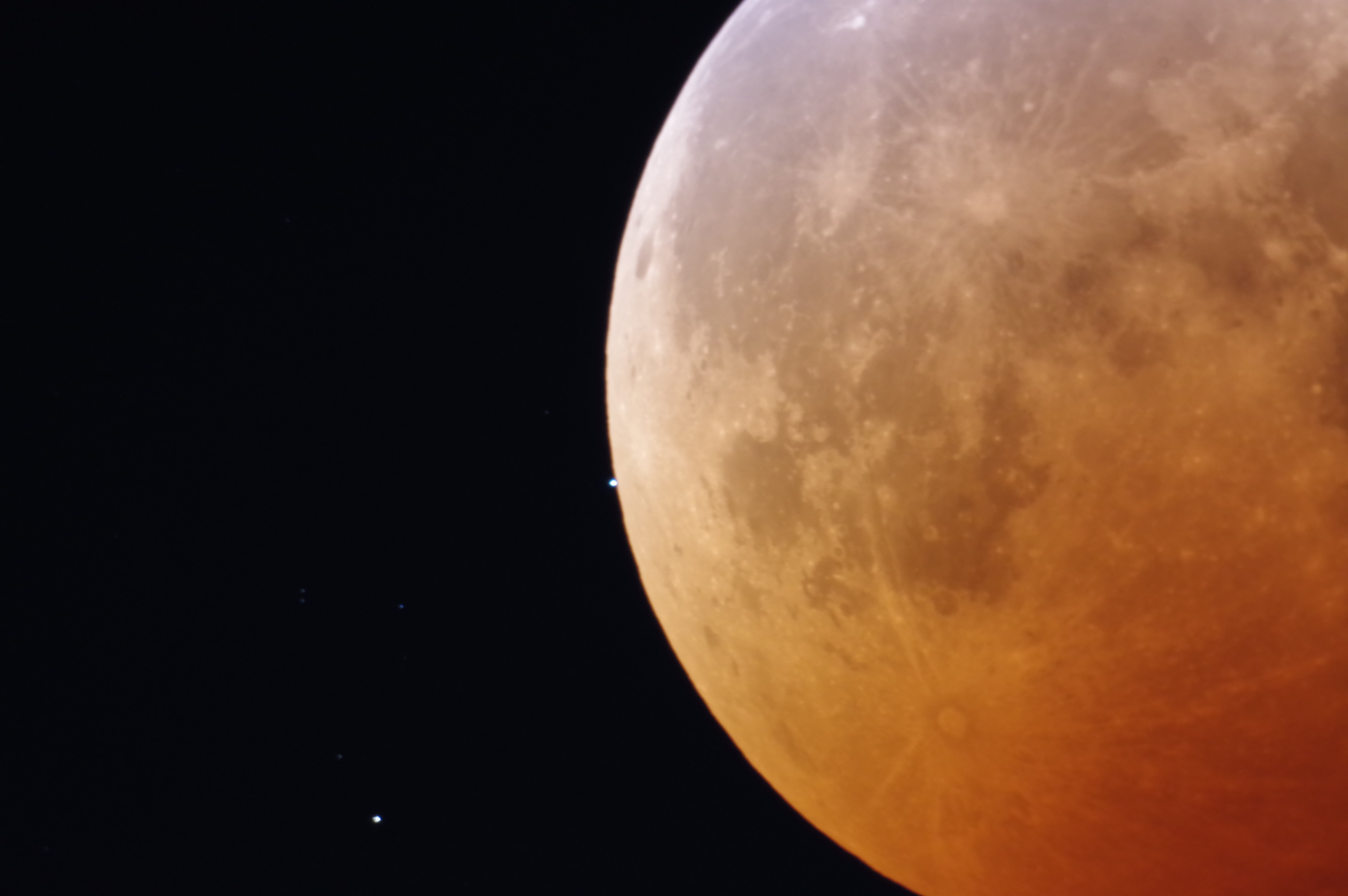
Occultation of Uranus during the lunar eclipse on 8 November 2022.

Occultation of a star by the Moon.

The term occultation is most frequently used to describe lunar occultations, those relatively frequent occasions when the Moon passes in front of a star during the course of its orbital motion around the Earth. Since the Moon, with an angular speed with respect to the stars of 0.55 arcsec/s or 2.7 μrad/s, has a very thin atmosphere and stars have an angular diameter of at most 0.057 arcseconds or 0.28 μrad, a star that is occulted by the Moon will disappear or reappear in 0.1 seconds or less on the Moon's edge, or limb. Events that take place on the Moon's dark limb are of particular interest to observers, because the lack of glare allows easier observation and timing.

The Moon's orbit is inclined slightly with respect to the ecliptic meaning any star with an ecliptic latitude between –6.6 and +6.6 degrees may be occulted by it. Three first magnitude stars appear well within that band – Regulus, Spica, and Antares – meaning they may be occulted by the Moon or by planets. Occultations of Aldebaran are in this epoch only possible by the Moon, because the planets pass Aldebaran to the north. Neither planetary nor lunar occultations of Pollux are currently possible, however several thousand years ago lunar occultations were possible. Some notably close deep-sky objects, such as the Pleiades, can be occulted by the Moon.

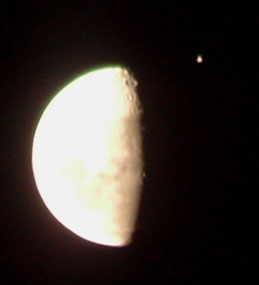
Jupiter (the bright object in the upper right) a few minutes before being occulted by the Moon on 16 June 2005.

Occultation of the planet Saturn by the Moon on 3 November 2001.

Ten Minute Time Lapse Video of the Total Solar Eclipse on April 8, 2024, in Mazatlán, Mexico.

Within a few kilometres of the edge of an occultation's predicted path, referred to as its northern or southern limit, an observer may see the star intermittently disappearing and reappearing as the irregular limb of the Moon moves past the star, creating what is known as a grazing lunar occultation. From an observational and scientific standpoint, these "grazes" are the most dynamic and interesting of lunar occultations.

The accurate timing of lunar occultations is performed regularly by (primarily amateur) astronomers. Lunar occultations timed to an accuracy of a few tenths of a second have various scientific uses, particularly in refining our knowledge of lunar topography. Photoelectric analysis of lunar occultations have also discovered some stars to be very close visual or spectroscopic binaries. Some angular diameters of stars have been measured by timing of lunar occultations, which is useful for determining effective temperatures of those stars. Early radio astronomers found occultations of radio sources by the Moon valuable for determining their exact positions, because the long wavelength of radio waves limited the resolution available through direct observation. This was crucial for the unambiguous identification of the radio source 3C 273 with the optical quasar and its jet, and a fundamental prerequisite for Maarten Schmidt's discovery of the cosmological nature of quasars.

Several times during the year the Moon can be seen occulting a planet. Since planets, unlike stars, have significant angular sizes, lunar occultations of planets will create a narrow zone on Earth from which a partial occultation of the planet will occur. An observer located within that narrow zone could observe the planet's disk partly blocked by the slowly moving Moon. The same mechanism can be seen with the Sun, where observers on Earth will view it as a solar eclipse. Therefore, a total solar eclipse is essentially the Moon occulting the Sun.

== Occultation by planets ==
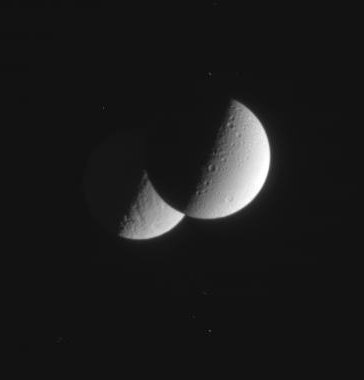
A grazing occultation of Rhea by Dione, two moons of Saturn, imaged by Cassini–Huygens.

Stars may also be occulted by planets. Occultations of bright stars are rare. In 1959, Venus occulted Regulus, and the next occultation of a bright star (also Regulus by Venus) will be in 2044. Uranus's rings were first discovered when that planet occulted a star in 1977. On 3 July 1989, Saturn passed in front of the 5th magnitude star 28 Sagittarii. Pluto occulted stars in 1988, 2002, and 2006, allowing its tenuous atmosphere to be studied via atmospheric limb sounding.

In rare cases, one planet can pass in front of another. If the nearer planet appears larger than the more distant one, the event is called a mutual planetary occultation. The last occultation or transit occurred on 3 January 1818 and the next will occur on 22 November 2065, in both cases involving the same two planets—Venus and Jupiter.

Jupiter rarely occults Saturn. This is one of the rarest events known, with the next occurrence on 16 February 7541. This event is visible worldwide since the duo would be positioned almost in opposition to the sun, in the border line between the constellations of Orion and Taurus. In some areas this occultation cannot be seen, but when viewed through even small telescopes, both gas giants appear to be in the same part of view through the eyepiece. The last one occurred in 6857 B.C.E.

== Occultations by smaller bodies ==
A further set of occultations are those when a small Solar System body or dwarf planet passes in front of a star, temporarily blocking its light as seen from Earth. These occultations are useful for measuring the size and position of body much more precisely than can be done by other means. A cross-sectional profile of the shape of a body can even be determined if a number of observers at different, nearby, locations observe the occultation. Occultations have been used to calculate the diameter of trans-Neptunian objects such as 2002 TX_{300}, Ixion and Varuna. Software for coordinating observations is available for download at http://www.occultwatcher.net/

In addition, mutual occultation and eclipsing events can occur between a primary and its satellite. A large number of moons have been discovered analyzing the photometric light curves of small bodies and detecting a second, superimposed brightness variation, from which an orbital period for the satellite (secondary), and a secondary-to-primary diameter-ratio (for the binary system) can often be derived.

=== Examples ===
Notable occultations of asteroids
Name	Chords	Measured profile (km)
704 Interamnia	35	350×304
39 Laetitia	~16	219×142
94 Aurora	9	225×173
375 Ursula	6	216±10
444 Gyptis	6	179×150
48 Doris	4	278×142

==== Asteroids ====
- On 29 May 1983, 2 Pallas occulted the naked-eye bright spectroscopic binary star 1 Vulpeculae along a track across the southern United States, northern Mexico, and north parts of the Caribbean. Observations from 130 different locations defined the shape of about two-thirds of the asteroid, and detected the secondary companion of the bright binary star; these observations, taken together with those of a separate occultation by Pallas in 1979, provided a complete figure for the asteroid eight years before any asteroid was visited by a spacecraft (the much smaller Gaspra by Galileo in October 1991).
- On 12 March 2009 nine asteroids (85 Io, 247 Eukrate, 1585 Union, 201 Penelope, 70 Panopaea, 980 Anacostia, 2448 Sholokhov, 1746 Brouwer, and 191 Kolga) occulted notable magnitude stars, viewed from given places on the Earth.
- According to the 1998 European Asteroidal Occultation Results from Euraster, 39 Laetitia was observed by over 38 observatories in one occultation on 3 March 1998, which resulted in many chords being determined.
- The star Regulus was occulted by the asteroid 163 Erigone in the early morning of 20 March 2014. This was the brightest occultation of an asteroid ever predicted to occur over a populated area. As the main belt asteroid passed in front of the star its 100 km (60 mi) shadow swept across Nassau and Suffolk counties, all of New York City and the Hudson River Valley, with the center of the shadow path following a line roughly connecting New York City, White Plains, Newburgh, Oneonta, Rome, and Pulaski before crossing into Canada near Belleville and North Bay, Ontario. Bad weather obscured the occultation.
- The star Betelgeuse was partially occulted by the asteroid 319 Leona in the early morning of 12 December 2023. The event could only be viewed over a small strip of America, Europe, and Asia.

This animation shows the path of the shadow of the dwarf planet Makemake during an occultation of a faint star in April 2011. Note: the actual shape of the shadow on Earth will not be exactly round as shown here. This video is to illustrate the phenomenon.

==== Distant objects ====
- Preliminary results of a 6 November 2010 occultation by the dwarf planet Eris of a magnitude 17 star (USNOA2 0825-00375767) in the constellation of Cetus placed an upper limit on Eris's diameter of 2320 km, making it almost the same size as Pluto. Due to their slower movement through the night sky, occultations by TNOs are far less common than by asteroids in the main-belt.
- The dwarf planet Haumea was observed in a stellar transit on 21 January 2017, identifying a ring.
- On 3 June 2017, a star was occulted by the Kuiper belt object 486958 Arrokoth, the first such occultation detected. The multi-faceted campaign involved cooperation from the Argentinian government (including local governments – a major highway was closed for two hours, and street lights were turned off, in order to preclude light pollution), three spacecraft, 24 portable ground-based telescopes, and NASA's SOFIA airborne observatory in "the most challenging stellar occultation in the history of astronomy," in an effort spanning six months.

== Double occultations ==
The Moon or another celestial body can occult multiple celestial bodies at the same time.

Because of its relatively large angular diameter, the Moon occults an indeterminate number of stars and galaxies at any given time. However, the Moon occulting (obscuring) two bright objects (e.g. two planets or a bright star and a planet) simultaneously is extremely rare, and it can be seen only from a small part of the world: The last such event was on 23 April 1998, when the Moon occulted Venus and Jupiter for observers in the southern Atlantic Ocean and a small portion of Brazil. It was the first time such a double occultation was observable anywhere on Earth since the year 567.

== Artificial occultations ==
The Big Occulting Steerable Satellite (BOSS) was a proposed satellite that would work in conjunction with a telescope to detect planets around distant stars. The satellite consists of a large, very lightweight sheet, and a set of maneuvering thrusters and navigation systems. It would maneuver to a position along the line of sight between the telescope and a nearby star. The satellite would thereby block the radiation from the star, permitting the orbiting planets to be observed.

The proposed satellite would have a dimension of 70 by 70 metres (230 ft × 230 ft), a mass of about 600 kg, and maneuver by means of an ion drive engine in combination with using the sheet as a light sail. Positioned at a distance of 100,000 km from the telescope, it would block more than 99.998% of the starlight.

There are two possible configurations of this satellite. The first would work with a space telescope, most likely positioned near the Earth's L_{2} Lagrangian point. The second would place the satellite in a highly elliptical orbit about the Earth, and work in conjunction with a ground telescope. At the apogee of the orbit, the satellite would remain relatively stationary with respect to the ground, allowing longer exposure times.

An updated version of this design is called the Starshade, which uses a sunflower-shaped coronagraph disc. A comparable proposal was also made for a satellite to occult bright X-ray sources, called an X-ray Occulting Steerable Satellite or XOSS.

== See also ==
- Astronomical transit
- Conjunction
- GPS occultation
- Grazing lunar occultation
- Grazing occultation
- List of minor planets
- List of Solar System objects by size
- Lunar occultation of Venus
- Occultations, transits, and eclipses
- Planetary transits and occultations
- Radio occultation
- Solar eclipse
- Syzygy (astronomy)
- TAOS: The Taiwanese-American Occultation Survey
- Transit of Mercury
- Transit of Venus
