= Celestial police =

Informal name for the German United Astronomical Society

The Celestial police (German: Himmelspolizey), officially the United Astronomical Society (German: Vereinigte Astronomische Gesellschaft), was a cooperation of numerous European astronomers in the early 19th century. It is mainly known in relation to the search for objects expected between the orbits of Mars and Jupiter. It was formed in 1800 at the second European congress of astronomers. At the first such congress, in 1798, the French mathematician Jérôme Lalande had called for a coordinated search, in which each participating observatory would patrol a particular part of the sky. The group confirmed or discovered the four largest minor planets, which would lead to the identification of the asteroid belt. They also initiated the compilation of better star catalogues and the investigation of variable stars. They pioneered international collaboration and communication in astronomy.

== Founding ==
In 1798 Franz Xaver von Zach had organised and hosted the first European congress of astronomers at his observatory in Gotha. Zach was also editor of the monthly journals Allgemeine Geographische Ephemeriden (since 1798) and Monatliche Correspondenz zur Beförderung der Erd- und Himmels-Kunde (since 1800). The second congress in 1800 was held with smaller attendance and more focussed agenda in Lilienthal, at the observatory of Johann Hieronymus Schröter. Schröter had arranged for a visit by Prince Adolph Frederick to coincide with the congress.

Foremost on the agenda for the congress was the founding of the Vereinigte Astronomische Gesellschaft (United Astronomical Society). Six astronomers were present to found the society on 20 September 1800, with Schröter as president and von Zach as director or secretary. The founding members were:

- Johann Hieronymus Schröter (Lilienthal), president
- Adolf von Ende (Celle)
- Johann Gildemeister (Bremen)
- Wilhelm Olbers (Bremen)
- Karl Ludwig Harding (Lilienthal)
- Franz Xaver von Zach (Gotha), director or secretary

== Tasks ==
=== Star catalogues ===
The main workload for the society was the compilation of more precise star catalogues and to improve knowledge of spherical astronomy and coordinate systems. This was required for two reasons:

- It was necessary to identify and locate the positions of fainter celestial objects than in the past.
- Sound definitions of coordinate systems were needed as basis for the precise determination of the orbits of newly discovered celestial bodies.

An area of 15° width centred on the ecliptic was to be catalogued. To share the workload, the ecliptic was divided into 24 zones each extending 15° in longitude and 7° or 8° either side in latitude.

=== New comets and further planets ===
The task that the Celestial police is best known for was the search for a small planet that was expected to exist between the orbits of Mars and Jupiter. The existence of such a body followed from the Titius-Bode law, a geometric series of the orbital radii from Mercury to Uranus, which has a gap at 2.8 astronomical units. Even Johannes Kepler had postulated such an undiscovered planet in 1596 in his Mysterium Cosmographicum.

Given the discovery of Uranus in 1781, more planets might also be found beyond Saturn. And new and telescopic comets might be found.

=== Further tasks ===
The question of stellar parallax and the distance of the stars was an important topic at the turn from the 18th to the 19th century. This was hence also on the agenda of the Celestial police.

Another new topic of astronomical research in the early 19th century was the surveillance of variable stars and novae.

As an international collaboration of astronomers, the Celestial police also noted the need for communication, both among participants and through a publication like von Zach's Monatliche Correspondenz zur Beförderung der Erd- und Himmels-Kunde.

== Members ==
The division of labour into 24 zones of ecliptic longitude required the Celestial police to have 24 members, with one zone allocated to each member. The canonical list of 24 members of the celestial police are:

- Johann Elert Bode (Berlin)
- Johann Tobias Bürg (Vienna)
- Thomas Bugge (Copenhagen)
- Johann Karl Burckhardt (Paris)
- Adolf von Ende (Celle)
- Johann Gildemeister (Bremen)
- Karl Ludwig Harding (Lilienthal)
- William Herschel (Slough)
- Johann Sigismund Gottfried Huth (Frankfurt (Oder))
- Georg Simon Klügel (Halle (Saale))
- Julius August Koch (Gdańsk)
- Nevil Maskelyne (Greenwich)
- Daniel Melanderhjelm (Stockholm)
- Pierre Méchain (Paris)
- Charles Messier (Paris)
- Wilhelm Olbers (Bremen)
- Barnaba Oriani (Milan)
- Giuseppe Piazzi (Palermo)
- Johann Hieronymus Schröter (Lilienthal)
- Theodor von Schubert (Saint Petersburg)
- Jöns Svanberg (Uppsala); Svanberg replaced Jan Śniadecki (Kraków) when the future of his observatory was in doubt
- Joseph Thulis (Marseille)
- Johann Friedrich Wurm (Blaubeuren)
- Franz Xaver von Zach (Gotha)

Jérôme Lalande had been invited, but declined due to other commitments. Some invitations may have been issued late or may never have arrived. Not every invitee actively participated in the survey of the ecliptic, and others who worked on the tasks, such as Friedrich Bessel, are not included in the group. Carl Friedrich Gauss (Braunschweig) became a member in 1801 and, jointly with Olbers, became foreign correspondent in 1804.

== Results ==
=== Ceres ===
On 1 January 1801, apparently by coincidence and independent of the Celestial police, Piazzi was working on a star catalogue and found a moving object, the first minor planet, (1) Ceres. He announced it as a new comet, but due to the lack of nebulosity suspected it might be a small planet. It was not until September 1801 that his complete observations were published. Gauss then developed his method of determining orbits from astrometric observations. This confirmed not only a planetary rather than a cometary orbit, it also enabled von Zach and Olbers to "recover" the minor planet, i.e. to find it again after its passage behind the Sun.

Because the orbit of Ceres matched the requirement from the Titius-Bode law, the planet missing between Mars and Jupiter seemed to have been found, but it was disappointingly faint.

=== Pallas, Juno and Vesta ===
In March 1802 Olbers was working on the star catalogue of his zone, in preparation of Ceres arriving in the area, when he discovered another moving star, the second minor planet, (2) Pallas.

The presence of two minor planets between Mars and Jupiter had several consequences. It cast doubt on the Titius-Bode law, which called for a single, large planet. It prompted William Herschel, discoverer of Uranus, to propose an alternative term "asteroid" instead of "planet". While the use of "planet" could not continue, "asteroid" was not generally accepted until decades later.

Olbers took the presence of two minor planets to suggest that a former planet had been destroyed by a collision with a comet. This could restore the Titius-Bode law and offered hope to find more minor planets, in particular at the crossing points of the orbits of Ceres and Pallas. Huth and von Zach favoured the opposite idea, that the minor planets were just small planets in a region where they failed to form a full-size planet.

Pursuing Olbers' idea, Harding in September 1804 found (3) Juno, and Olbers in March 1807 found (4) Vesta.

=== Further developments ===
After discovering such a large number of relatively small objects in a similar orbit, it became clear that no planet-sized object likely existed in that region. The group members' interest waned in the search. Additionally, the Napoleonic Wars had disrupted the work of several group members, especially when the war came to Lilienthal, where Schröter's observatory had served as the home for many of the scientists working with the celestial police. Schröter died in 1816; other members of the Celestial police had moved elsewhere or changed the focus of their work. It would be another generation before any further major discoveries of planets (or even large asteroids) occurred.

The division of labour pioneered by the celestial police, around 1850, led to the concept of surveys, also to the compilation of catalogues of nebulae. The most famous star catalogue of the 19th century is the Bonner Durchmusterung with 300,000 stars, which was later extended through the work of more southerly observatories.

== See also ==
- Astronomische Gesellschaft
- List of astronomical societies
