= Adolf von Ende =

German lawyer

Ferdinand Adolf Freiherr von Ende
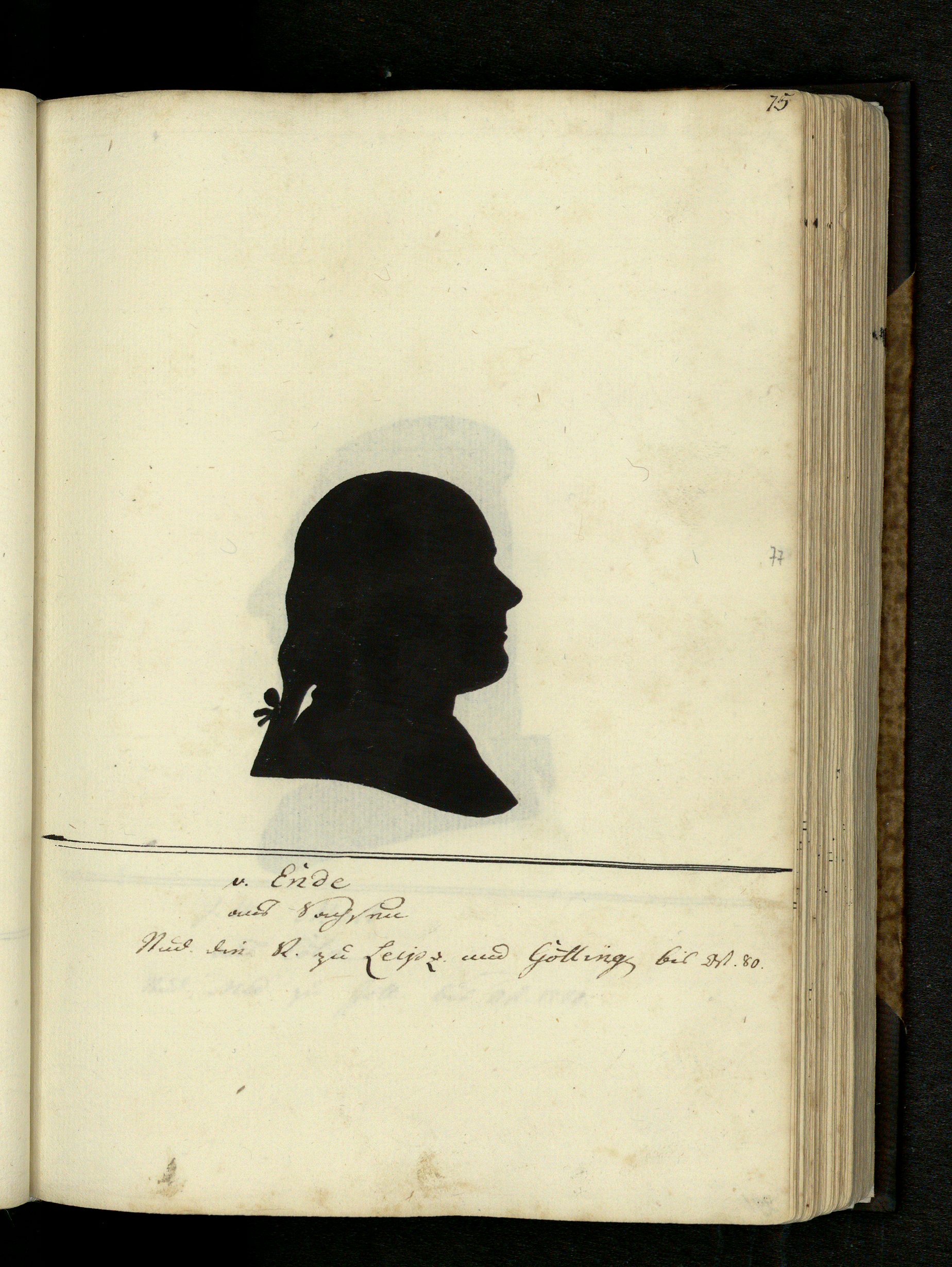
- Silhouette of Adolf von Ende, student of law in Göttingen (1778)
- Born: 9 March 1760; Lucklum (near Braunschweig)
- Died: 10 July 1816 (aged 56); Cologne

Ferdinand Adolf Freiherr von Ende (born 9 March 1760 in Lucklum (near Braunschweig); died 10 July 1816 in Cologne) was a German lawyer and Württemberg Minister of Justice.

== Family ==
His parents were Gotthelf Dietrich von Ende (4 June 1726 – 13 October 1798) and his wife Countess Johanna Adelheid von der Schulenburg-Wolfsburg (27 November 1735 – 12 May 12, 1805). His father was royal British and Hanoverian minister of state, real privy councillor and heir to Monzig near Meißen; his mother was the daughter of the Prussian general Adolph Friedrich von der Schulenburg. His brother was the Prussian general and commander of Cologne Friedrich Albrecht Gotthilf von Ende.

== Career ==
Von Ende was prepared by his tutors to study at university. He studied in Leipzig under the guidance of Hofmeister Höpfer and later moved to Göttingen, where he became a member of the Landsmannschaft der Kurländer (student association). (Note: Although he was born in Lucklum as the son of a father in Hanoverian service, he enrolled in Göttingen as a "stud. jur. from Saxony". According to the convention protocols of the Hannoversche Landsmannschaft, membership was made possible by the Kurländer Landsmannschaft lifting the cantonation requirement. Deneke, Otto (1937). Alte Göttinger Landsmannschaften – Urkunden zu ihrer frühesten Geschichte (1737–1813). Göttingen: Vandenhoeck & Ruprecht. As a family register entry in the Göttingen city archives 109, 68 (1776) with editorial note "Indication of origin erased"(!), 188, 13.) His silhouette from his time in Göttingen is preserved in the Schubert silhouette collection.

In 1780 he became a law firm auditor in Celle, in 1783 he became an extraordinary judicial councillor in Stade, then a full judicial councillor and, after a few years, senior appellate councillor in Celle. He stayed there until 1803. He then entered the service of the Elector of Württemberg and from 1806 to 1809 became head of the justice department in the Württemberg State Ministry in Stuttgart. From 1810, von Ende was the Baden secret legation councillor in Karlsruhe and from this time lived in Mannheim.

He died unmarried in Cologne.

== Interests ==
In addition to his professional interest in law, von Ende also pursued historical studies. For example, he drew attention to some unclear passages in the works of Strabo and Cicero. He also had a strong interest in astronomy. He tried to observe for himself all celestial phenomena, such as eclipses, star occultations and comets (especially the Great Comet of 1811). On his travels he often took portable instruments (especially sextant and watch) with him to determine geographical locations, for example on a trip to Leipzig and Dresden in 1799. In Celle he set up an observatory on his house, whose instruments he later took with him to Mannheim. He eventually sold his reflector to Mannheim Observatory and showed great interest in its financial provision.

Together with Johann Hieronymus Schröter, Franz Xaver von Zach, Johann Gildemeister, Wilhelm Olbers and Karl Ludwig Harding, he founded the Vereinigte Astronomische Gesellschaft in 1800.

== Publications ==
His list of publications is as varied as his interests: Von Ende anonymously published several historical and legal essays in the braunschweigisch-lüneburgische Annalen and, with Andreas Ludolf Jacobi (1746–1825), published Sammlungen für Geschichte und Staatskunde aus den braunschweigisch-lüneburgischen Kurlanden (collections on history and political studies from the Braunschweig-Lüneburg Courlands).

Other legal publications from his pen were:

- Vermischte juristische Abhandlungen (miscellaneous legal treatises), Celle 1802
- Vermischte juristische Aufsätze (miscellaneous legal essays), 1816.

On the topic of astronomy, von Ende published, in addition to small essays in the magazine Monatliche Correspondenz zur Förderung der Erd- und Himmels-Kunde, edited by Franz Xaver von Zach, and in the Berliner Astronomisches Jahrbuch, edited by Johann Elert Bode, the following:

- Geographische Ortsbestimmungen im Niedersächsischen Kreise nebst einigen astronomischen Beobachtungen und Bemerkungen (geographical location determinations in the Lower Saxony district along with some astronomical observations and comments), 1802
- Ueber Massen und Steine, die aus dem Monde auf die Erde gefallen sind (about masses and stones that fell from the moon to the earth), 1804. N.B.: This publication took into account the hypothesis put forward at the time that the meteor stones came from the moon.

In his astronomical writings, von Ende spoke out against the possible visibility of the Galilean moons with the naked eye. However, when it came to the question of the supposed moon of Venus, he did not want to definitively acknowledge that such phenomena can always be traced back to an optical illusion.
