= First European congress of astronomers =

Astronomy conference in Gotha, Germany (1798)

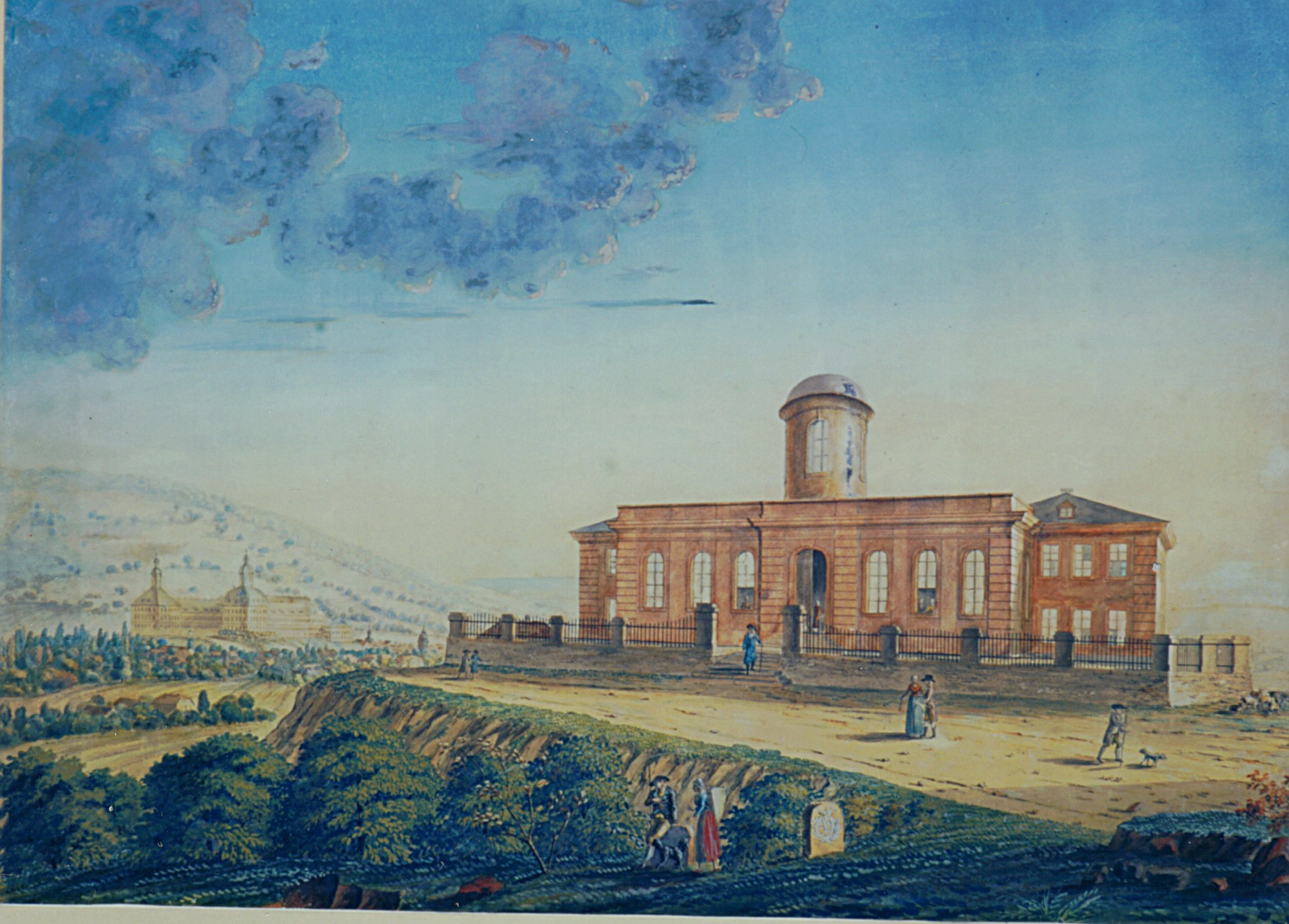
Seeberg Observatory ca. 1800

The first European congress of astronomers took place in August 1798 at the Seeberg Observatory in Gotha, Germany. It lasted around ten days. Organized by Franz Xaver von Zach, the congress brought together European astronomers to discuss star cataloging, instrumentation, and the adoption of the metric system. A follow-up congress in 1800 led to the formation of the celestial police, an association of astronomers that discovered several minor planets.

== Organization ==
The Seeberg Observatory, commissioned in 1790 by Franz Xaver von Zach, quickly became a centre of the European astronomical community. Zach corresponded with almost all colleagues in the field, and the observatory he designed was visited often because of its innovative features.

At the beginning of 1798, the French astronomer Jérôme Lalande expressed a desire to visit the Seeberg Observatory, where he hoped to meet the Berlin astronomer Johann Elert Bode. Zach sent invitations to astronomy-related professionals; the meeting was scheduled for early August. Among the invitees were Taddäus Derfflinger from the Kremsmünster Observatory, Roger Barry from Mannheim Observatory, Christian Friedrich Rüdiger from Leipzig Observatory, and M. A. David and Antonín Strnad from Prague Observatory. In most cases, these invitations were received positively and supported by the respective sovereigns. However, some feared the influence of revolutionary French ideas. Jurij Vega from Vienna, who was invited by Lalande, was not allowed to travel to Gotha. Johann Hieronymus Schroeter in Lilienthal and Heinrich Wilhelm Olbers in Bremen stayed away on their own initiative because they suspected that the metric system of units was being propagated.

== Participants ==
These were the participants at the congress:

- Johann Elert Bode (1747–1826), Berlin, astronomer
- George Butler (1774–1853), Cambridge, traveller, student
- Johannes Feer (1763–1823), Zürich, surveyor
- Ludwig Wilhelm Gilbert (1769–1824), Halle, professor of physics
- Johann Kaspar Horner (1774–1834), Gotha, assistant to Zach
- Johann Jakob Huber (1733–1798), Basel, astronomer
- Georg Simon Klügel (1739–1812), Halle, professor and optician
- Johann Gottfried Köhler (1745–1800), Dresden, Mathematical-Physical Salon
- Jérôme Lalande (1732–1807), Paris, astronomer
- Marie-Jeanne de Lalande (1768–1832), Paris, astronomical calculator
- Carl Philipp Heinrich Pistor (1778–1847), Berlin, postal secretary and instrument maker
- Johann Konrad Schaubach (1764–1849), Meiningen, high school director
- Karl Felix Seyffer (1762–1822), Göttingen, astronomer
- Johann Heinrich Seyffert (1751–1817), Dresden, finance secretary
- Johann Friedrich Wurm (1760–1833), Nürtingen, astronomical calculator, priest
- Franz Xaver von Zach (1754–1832), Gotha, astronomer
- Possibly also Martin van Marum (1750–1837), Haarlem, physician and chemist

== Proceedings and results ==
Jérôme Lalande arrived at the Seeberg early, on 25 July, together with his niece-in-law, the astronomical calculator Marie-Jeanne de Lalande. Most of the other participants followed between the beginning of August and 9 August, when Bode arrived. Wurm and Huber arrived after Bode; Seyffer may have left before 9 August. Zach could accommodate most of the participants in the observatory buildings, but some had to stay at the inn Zur Schelle on Gotha's Hauptmarkt square. On clear evenings, everyone gathered in the Seeberg Observatory for observations and discussions.

The scope of the discussions was broad. It was clear from the outset that only closer cooperation could secure the desired successes. Star atlases and the reduction of star positions for aberration and nutation were discussed. Several participants were working on star catalogues and atlases or contributed data. The comparison of instruments brought along, especially chronometers and sextants, was a topic of discussion. An excursion to the Inselsberg on 14 August 1798 provided an opportunity for practical exercises. Duchess Charlotte of Saxe-Gotha-Altenburg also participated in this working trip.

The benefit of a common, decimal system of units (the metric system) and of a common time (Central European Time) was evident to those present, and they adopted these for their work. Introducing these more widely, beyond science, was not the business of astronomers; it was seen as a product of the French Revolution. Proposals for new constellations were controversial among astronomers. Lalande and Bode had designed new constellations before, and brought new proposals to the congress. Others, including Olbers, opposed new constellations.

Astronomical journals were likely also discussed. Although there was already the Berliner Astronomisches Jahrbuch, edited by Bode, this series of publications took too long to make new research results known. Further, comparatively little space was given to descriptive texts. Von Zach started editing the Allgemeine Geographische Ephemeriden the same year, 1798.

Not on the agenda were emerging fields like spectroscopy, or William Herschel's work on stellar statistics and the structure of the Milky Way.

The social gathering was also not neglected. As the duke's brother, Prince August, reported, Lalande's niece's name day was celebrated with a banquet, dance and small cannon.

Johann Jakob Huber, who travelled from Basel, fell ill shortly after his arrival and died unexpectedly on 21 August. His son Daniel Huber, who was a mathematician and, like his father, an astronomer, arrived in Gotha and made the acquaintance of Lalande and other scholars. By the end of August 1798 all participants had left.

== Aftermath ==
A second congress was held in 1800 in Lilienthal, with six participants who, apart from von Zach, were not present in 1798. This meeting founded the Vereinigte Astronomische Gesellschaft, better known as the Celestial police.

Eventually, European countries followed the scientists’ lead and adopted their standards for units and time. New constellations met with gradually increasing opposition among astronomers but were abolished only in 1925 by the International Astronomical Union, when a variation of the spherical rectangles of John Herschel, George Biddell Airy and Francis Baily were implemented.

The Astronomische Gesellschaft was founded in 1863 in Heidelberg. On the occasion of the 200th anniversary of the first European congress of astronomers, the Astronomische Gesellschaft held its 1998 spring meeting in Gotha. More than 120 astronomers from 15 countries attended. In honour of the anniversary, the asteroid (8130) Seeberg was named.

A globe and a metric ruler, presented by Lalande, are among the memorabilia in the Gotha museum of regional history.
