= Lilienthal, Lower Saxony =

Lilienthal
- Municipality
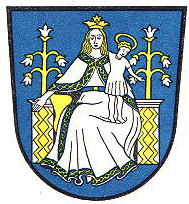
- Coat of arms

- Location of Lilienthal within Osterholz district
- Interactive map of Lilienthal
- Location within Germany Location within Lower Saxony
- Coordinates: 53°8′N 08°55′E
- Country: Germany
- State: Lower Saxony
- District: Osterholz

Government
  - Mayor (2022–27): Kim Fürwentsches (Greens)

Area
  - Total: 72.55 km^{2} (28.01 sq mi)
- Elevation: 0–12 m (0–39 ft)

Population (2025-12-31)
  - Total: 20,148
  - Density: 277.7/km^{2} (719.3/sq mi)
- Time zone: UTC+01:00 (CET)
  - Summer (DST): UTC+02:00 (CEST)
- Postal codes: 28865
- Dialling codes: 04298
- Vehicle registration: OHZ
- Website: www.lilienthal.de

Lilienthal (German pronunciation: [ˈliːliəntaːl]; Low German: Leendaal, Lelendaal) is a municipality in the administrative district of Osterholz, Lower Saxony, Germany. It borders Bremen (Free Hanseatic City of Bremen).

== History ==
Lilienthal belonged to the Prince-Archbishopric of Bremen.

=== Lilienthal monastery ===
The history of the small town (without Town privileges) of Lilienthal goes back to its founding as a nunnery by the prince-archbishop Gerhard II. In 1232 construction was begun on a convent of the Order of the Cistercians under the name of Vallis Liliorum (St. Mary's Nunnery in the Valley of Lilies), and the finished building was sanctified in 1264. During the 15th century, the cloister enjoyed a time of prosperity. After the Reformation and the conversion of the Cistercian nuns, it became a Lutheran Women's Convent, and until the end of the Thirty Years' War in 1648 it remained in deplorable conditions. In 1650, the city went through secularization. The land once belonging to the convent, which had become fragmented, developed into the small town of Lilienthal.

=== Sweden and Hanover ===
In 1648, according to the terms of the peace treaty that ended the Thirty Years' War (The Peace of Westphalia), the Prince-Archbishopric was transformed into the Duchy of Bremen, ruled together with the Principality of Verden, which were first ruled in personal union by the Swedish Crown. Queen Christina sent one of her commanders over, Graf Friedrich von Hessen-Eschwege, to the newly created barony (Herrschaft) of Osterholz, in which the charge of both Lilienthal and Osterholz were combined. After his early death in 1655, his wife Eleonora took over the government of the barony, with her seat in Osterholz, where she took an active role in the improvement of economic and sanitary conditions for the rural population. After her death in 1692, the barony fell back into the hands of the Swedish Royalty. Lilienthal remained a part of Swedish Bremen-Verden until 1712 (which is why the coat of arms contains the blue and yellow of the Swedish Flag), at which time it came under Danish occupation, and then in 1719 it fell under the sovereignty of the Electorate of Hanover, which ruled Bremen-Verden in personal union.

In 1740, the buildings of the convent except of the church were dismantled.

=== Astronomy in Lilienthal ===
In 1782, Johann Hieronymus Schröter became chief magistrate (or bailiff, Amtmann). In addition to this administrative office, he also played a large part in the advancement of astronomy during his lifetime. On the grounds of his office in Lilienthal, he constructed an observatory. In the following years, the Lilienthal Observatory would become the best equipped observatory in the world. One of its technological advances was the "Riesenteleskop" (giant telescope), a telescope with a 50.8 cm (20 inch) aperture and an 8.25 m focal length. Due to the telescope, Lilienthal became well-known and was sought out in matters of astronomy by government and military officials. Schröter remained in contact with many of the important astronomers of the time. Together with Wilhelm Olbers and other scholars, he founded the "celestial police" in Lilienthal in 1800. The asteroid 3 Juno was discovered September 1, 1804, by Karl Ludwig Harding at the observatory. After Schröter's death in 1816, the observatory fell into disrepair. In 1850 the remaining structure was destroyed. A large part of the observatory was sent to the University of Göttingen before the demolition.

=== 19th century ===
The Befreiungskrieg (a series of battles fought between 1813 and 1815 that ended the Napoleonic Wars) hit Lilienthal hard. After an incident during a retreat, French troops set the entire village on fire. Only the church, a few houses, and the observatory escaped the flames (but the observatory was looted, and important records were destroyed).

After the reconstruction, the then-municipality grew steadily. In 1939 there were 3,100 inhabitants, in 1974 12,500. After the incorporation of a neighbouring town in the same year, the population grew to 17,000.

In 1823 Bremen-Verden was united in a real union with the Kingdom of Hanover and its territory became part of the Stade Region. In 1866, the kingdom of Hannover lost its independence. Lilienthal became Prussian, in 1885 the bailiwick of Lilienthal was dissolved and combined with that in Osterholz to form the new district of Osterholz.

=== 20th and 21st century ===
From 1900 to 1956, Lilienthal was connected to Bremen and to the moorland region north of the town by a narrow-gauge railway. Nowadays, its alignment is used as a bikeway.

Since 1 August 2014, public transport in Lilienthal has been upgraded by a line of Bremen Tramway, passing through its main street.

Today, in Lilienthal there are 6 wind turbines, producing 6.013.246,00 kWh, annually.

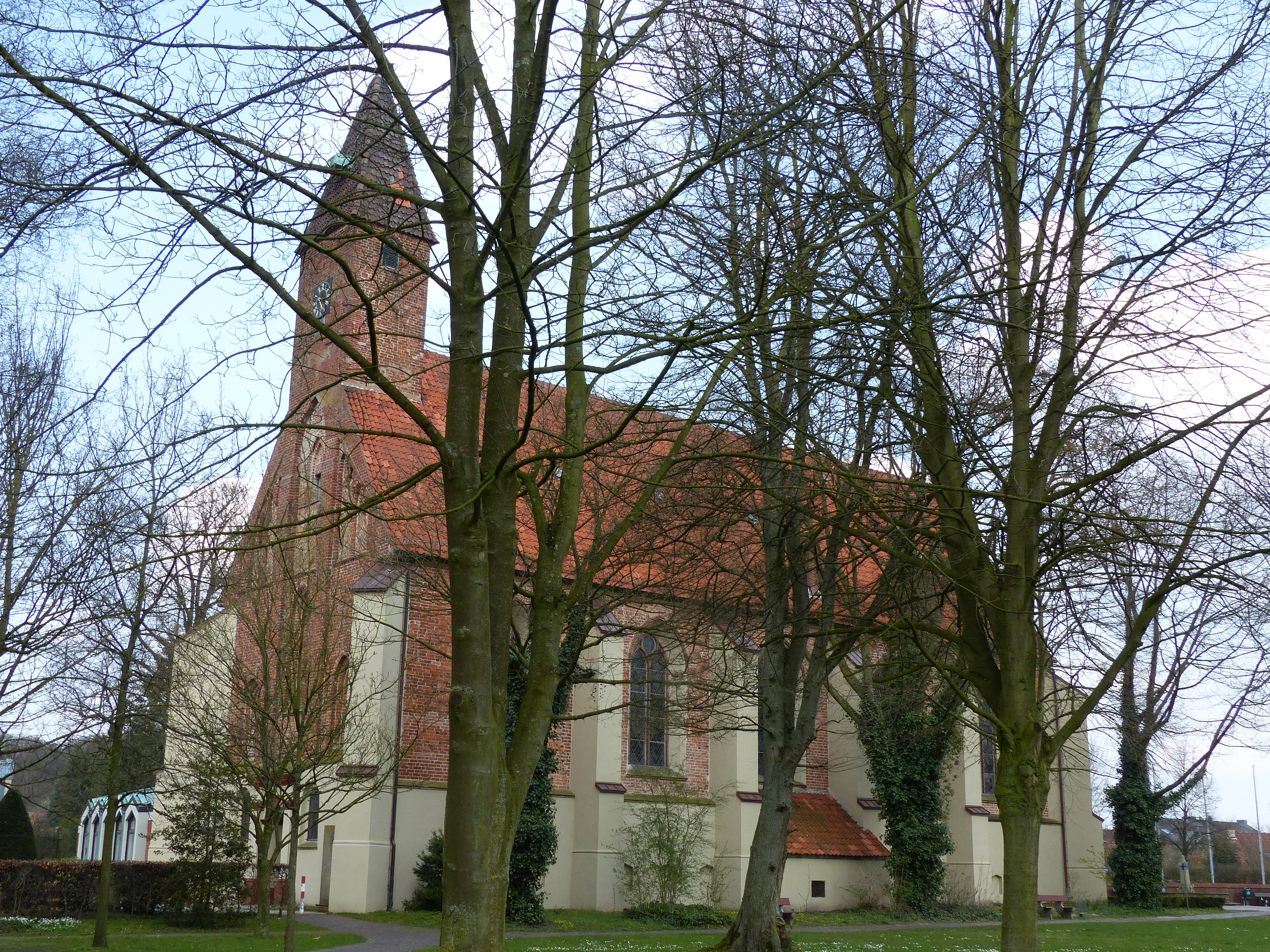
St-Mary's abbey church

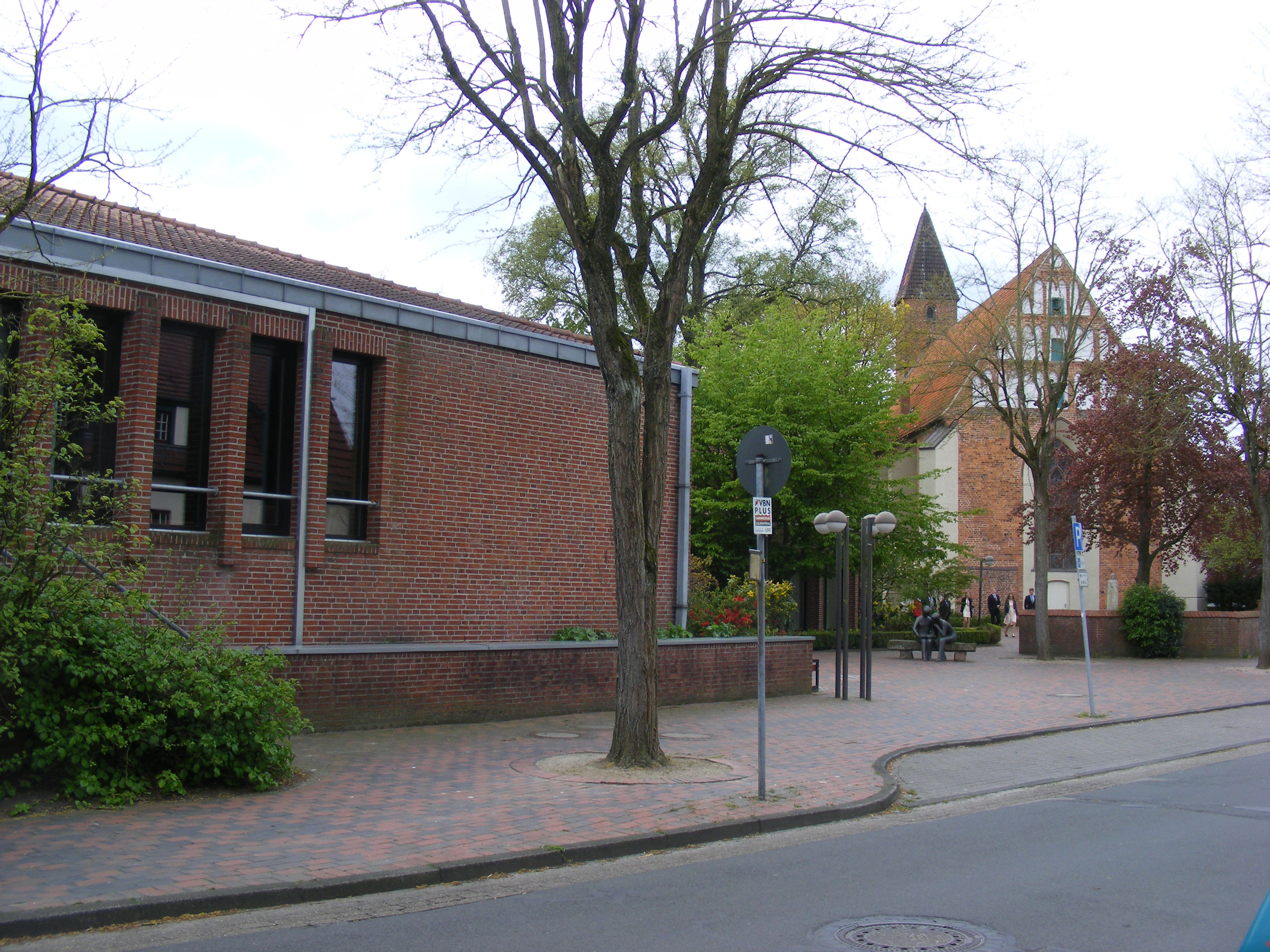
Town hall and abbey church

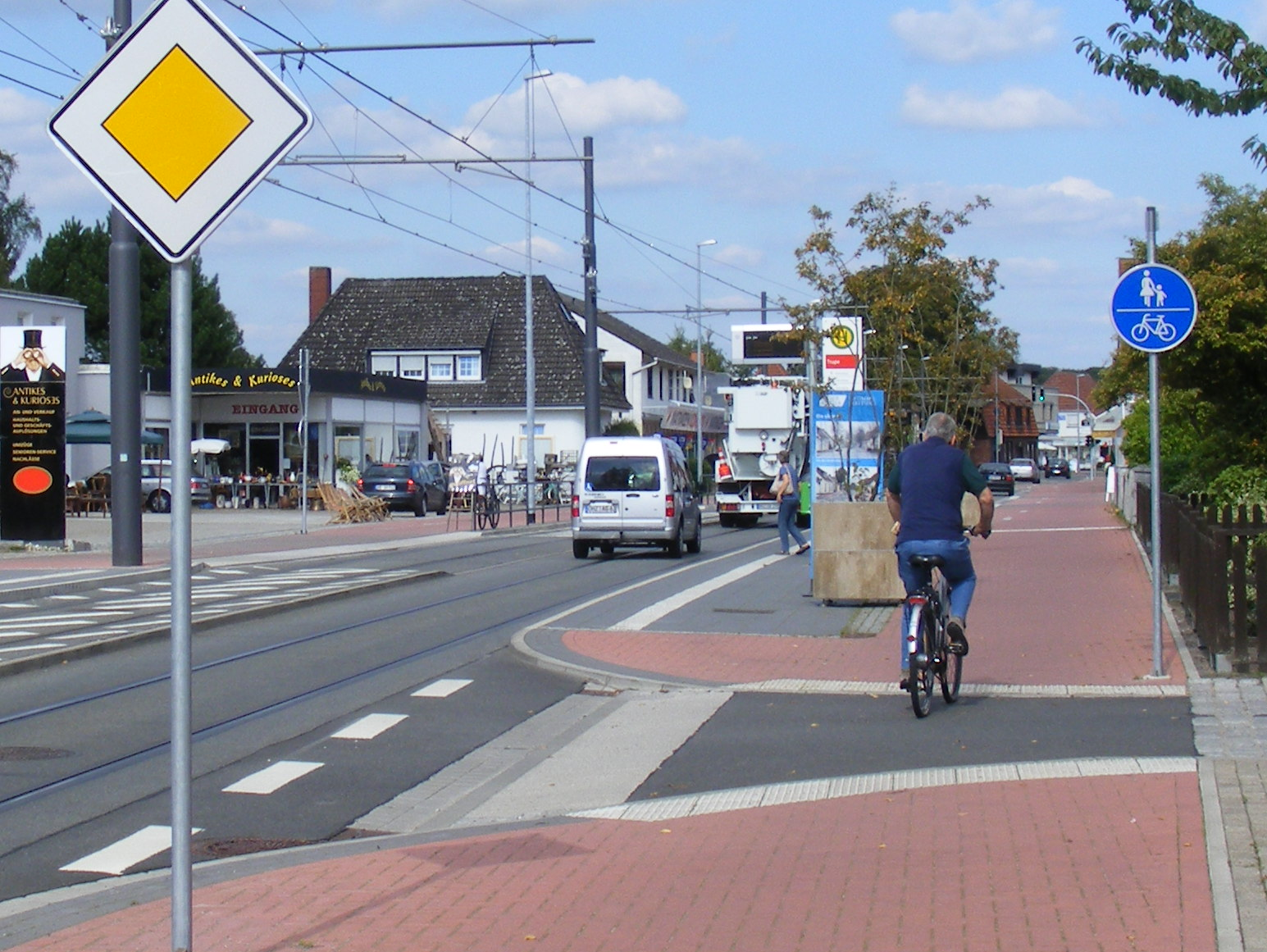
Main street with the line of Bremen Tramway, opened in 2014

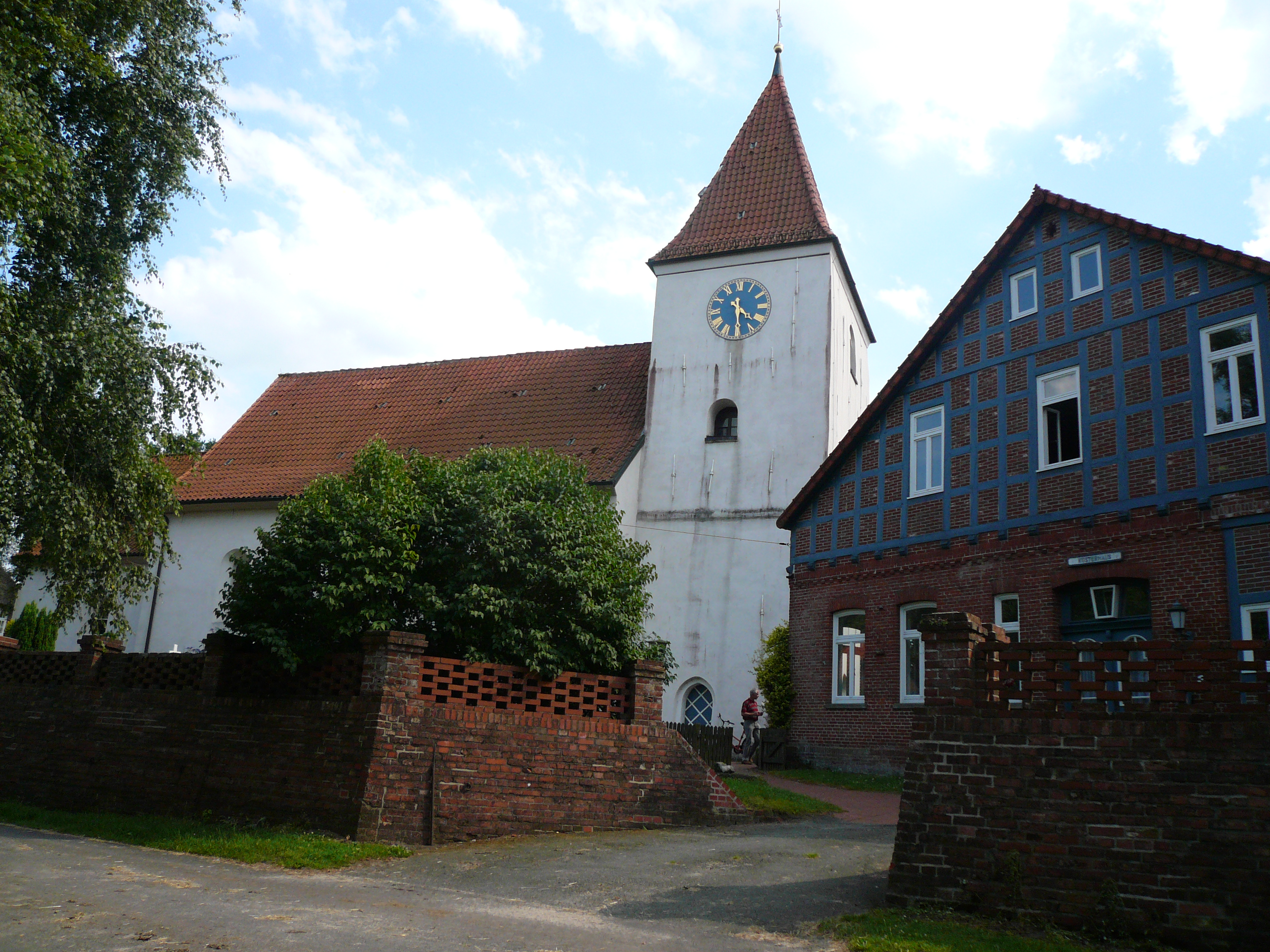
St-George's church in the locality of St. Jürgen

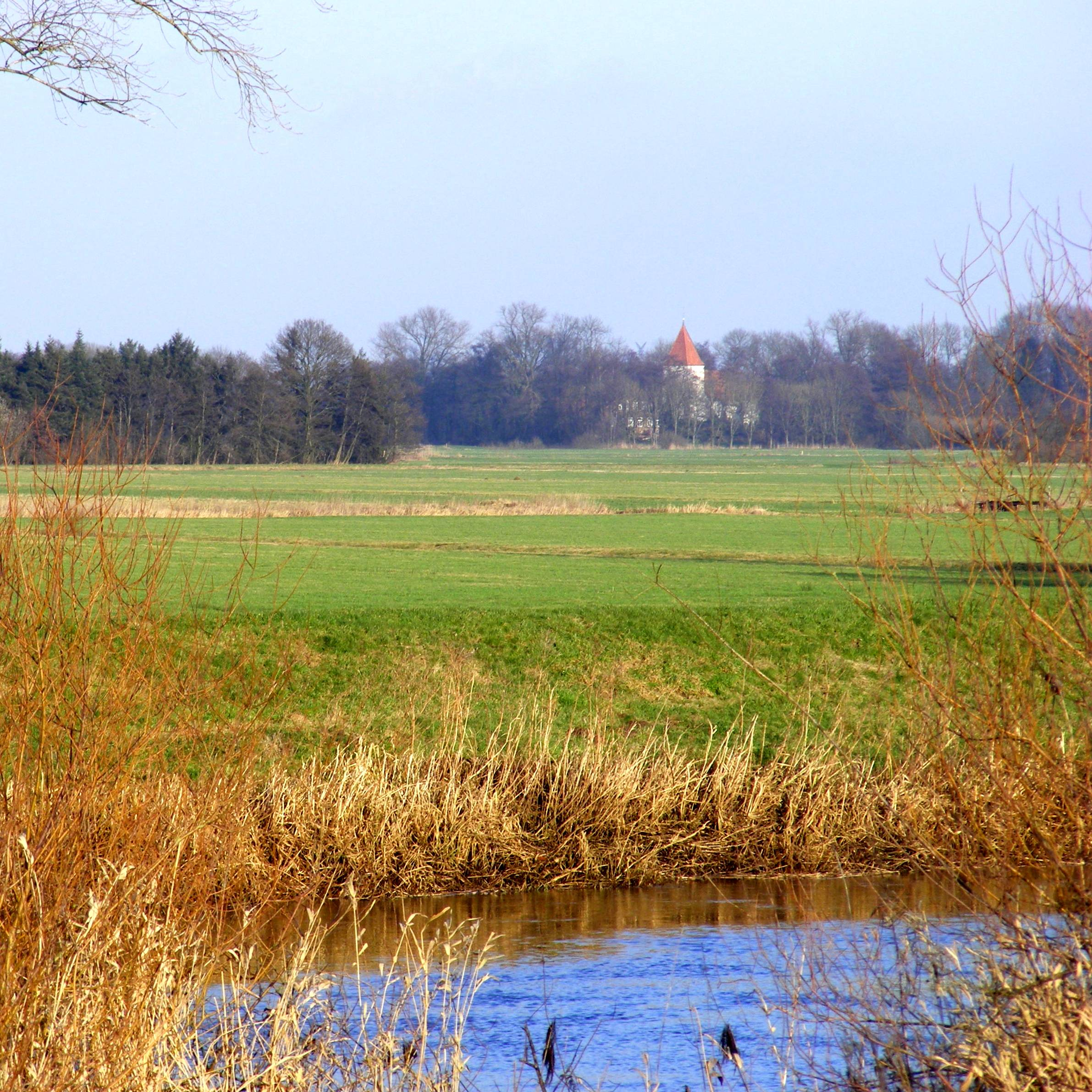
St-George's church, seen from the Bremish dyke of river Wümme

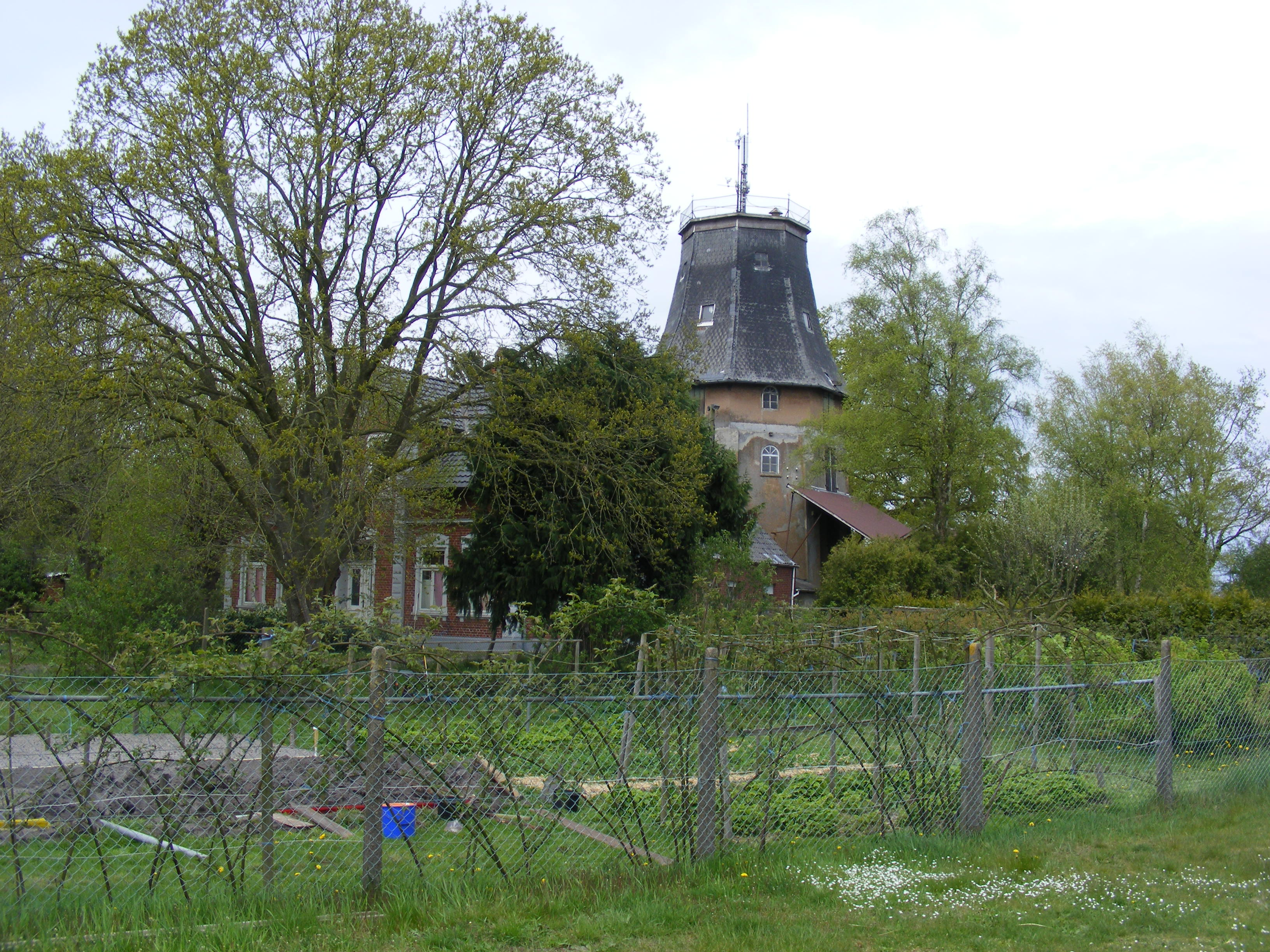
Tower of the windmill of the locality of Frankenburg

== Schools ==
- Primary education:
  - Falkenberg Primary School
  - Frankenburg Primary School
  - Schroeterschule
  - Seebergen Primary School
  - Trupermoor Primary School
  - Worphausen Primary School
- Secondary education:
  - All-Day Lilienthal Haupt- and Realschule
  - Gymnasium Lilienthal
- Special education:
  - Christoph-Tornée-School

== Localities ==
Today, many former independent villages have been merged into Lilienthal.

Some of them had been founded as late as in the moorland cultivation of the 18th century, organized by Jürgen Christian Findorff: Lüningsee (1763), Lüninghausen (1764), Westerwede (1764), Moorende (1778), Mooringen (1778), Schrötersdorf (1805, named after J. H. Schröter) and Neu Mooringen (1808).

There were several dates of merging:

- In 1827, Lilienthal received Butendiek, which was given from Bremen state to the Kingdom of Hanover, in exchange for some ground for the foundation of Bremerhaven.
- In 1929, some small Moorland villages were merged.
- In 1937,
  - Lilienthal incorporated Falkenberg, Frankenburg, a part of Moorhausen, Trupe, Truperdeich and Trupermoor,
  - Sankt Jürgen incorporated another part of Moorhausen, Niederende, Oberende and Wührden,
  - Worphausen incorporated Moorende and Mooringen
- In 1974, Lilienthal incorporated Heidberg, Sankt Jürgen, Seebergen and Worphausen.

== Twinned cities ==
- Since 1970, the municipality of Lilienthal has been twinned with the Dutch municipality of Stadskanaal.
- In 1993, the city of Émerainville in the vicinity of Paris was added.
