= 2003 Harding =

Main-belt asteroid

Discovery
- Discovered by: C. J. van Houten; I. van Houten-G. T. Gehrels
- Discovery site: Palomar Obs.
- Discovery date: 24 September 1960

Designations
- Named after: Karl Harding (German astronomer)
- Alternative designations: 6559 P-L · 1934 XH; 1941 BH · 1952 BP; 1952 DT · 1971 SU_{1} 1972 YT · 1973 AG_{1}
- Minor planet category: main-belt · (outer)

Orbital characteristics
- Epoch 4 September 2017 (JD 2458000.5)
- Uncertainty parameter 0
- Observation arc: 82.47 yr (30,122 days)
- Aphelion: 3.4477 AU
- Perihelion: 2.6723 AU
- Semi-major axis: 3.0600 AU
- Eccentricity: 0.1267
- Orbital period (sidereal): 5.35 yr (1,955 days)
- Mean anomaly: 98.138°
- Mean motion: 0° 11^{m} 2.76^{s} / day
- Inclination: 1.8693°
- Longitude of ascending node: 64.474°
- Argument of perihelion: 70.697°

Physical characteristics
- Dimensions: 20.173±0.112
- Synodic rotation period: 2.96 h (0.123 d)
- Geometric albedo: 0.065±0.005
- Spectral type: C
- Absolute magnitude (H): 12.0

2003 Harding, provisional designation 6559 P-L, is a carbonaceous Eoan asteroid from the outer regions of the asteroid belt, approximately 18 kilometers in diameter. It was discovered during the Palomar–Leiden survey on 24 September 1960, by astronomers Ingrid and Cornelis van Houten at Leiden, and Tom Gehrels at Palomar, California. The asteroid was later named after astronomer Karl Ludwig Harding.

== Orbit and characterization ==
The asteroid is a member of the Eos family. Orbiting the Sun at a distance of 2.7–3.4 AU once every 5 years and 4 months, the asteroid's path is nearly coplanar to the plane of the ecliptic with an orbital inclination of less than 2 degrees. It has a short rotation period of three hours.

The survey designation "P-L" stands for Palomar–Leiden, named after Palomar Observatory and Leiden Observatory, which collaborated on the fruitful Palomar–Leiden survey in the 1960s. Gehrels used Palomar's Samuel Oschin telescope (also known as the 48-inch Schmidt Telescope), and shipped the photographic plates to Ingrid and Cornelis van Houten at Leiden Observatory where astrometry was carried out. The trio are credited with the discovery of several thousand asteroid discoveries.

== Naming ==
The asteroid is named after German astronomer Karl Ludwig Harding (1765–1834), who discovered the minor planet 3 Juno. He is also honored by the lunar crater Harding. The official naming citation was published by the Minor Planet Center on 15 October 1977 (M.P.C. 4238).
