= Magi Society =

International association of astrologers

The Magi Society is an international association of astrologers.

Based in New York City, the society has developed and uses its own system of astrology, called Magi Astrology, that is based on “Planetary Geometry” which it defines as “geometric patterns made by drawing connecting lines between the positions of the planets.” Hay House, Inc. has published three books teaching the principles of Magi Astrology with the Magi Society as the author.

Through its books, the Magi Society advocates the use of declinations, heliocentric longitudes and latitudes in astrology as well as offering a methodology to interpret them. The Magi Society's third book claims that the position of Chiron (a planetoid) in a birth chart can be used to help predict romantic attraction.

They use heliocentric charts as well. From their recent research, the Magi Society uses the major asteroids/planetoids of Chiron, Ceres, Juno, Pallas and Vesta. They also recently attributed Sedna to stock market crashes.
