= Juno clump =

The Juno clump is a probable main-belt asteroid family that share similar orbital elements to 3 Juno.

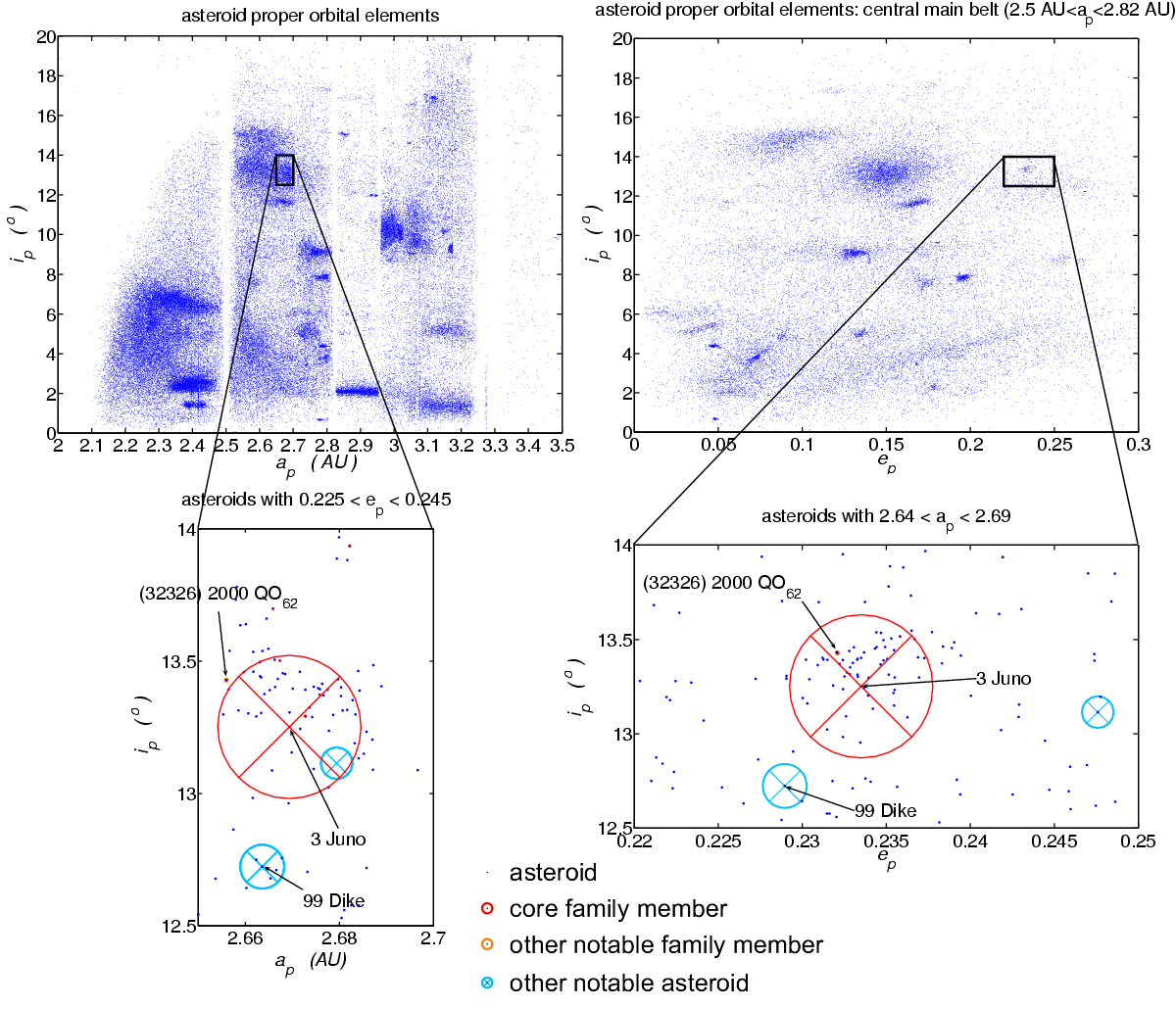
Location and structure of the Juno clump.

3 Juno is a large asteroid with a mean diameter of about 235 km, but the remaining bodies are all small. (32326) 2000 QO62, the brightest of those clearly in the visible clump would have a diameter of about 6 km, given the same albedo as 3 Juno. This indicates that it is probably a so-called cratering family composed of ejecta from impacts on 3 Juno.

The Hierarchical Clustering Method (HCM) analysis by (Zappalà 1995) determined several likely core members, whose proper elements lie in the approximate ranges

	a_{p}	e_{p}	i_{p}
min	2.64 AU	0.226	13.3°
max	2.68 AU	0.240	13.9°

At the present epoch, the range of osculating orbital elements of these core members is

	a	e	i
min	2.64 AU	0.238	11.8°
max	2.68 AU	0.274	14.6°
