= Joseph Thulis =

French astronomer

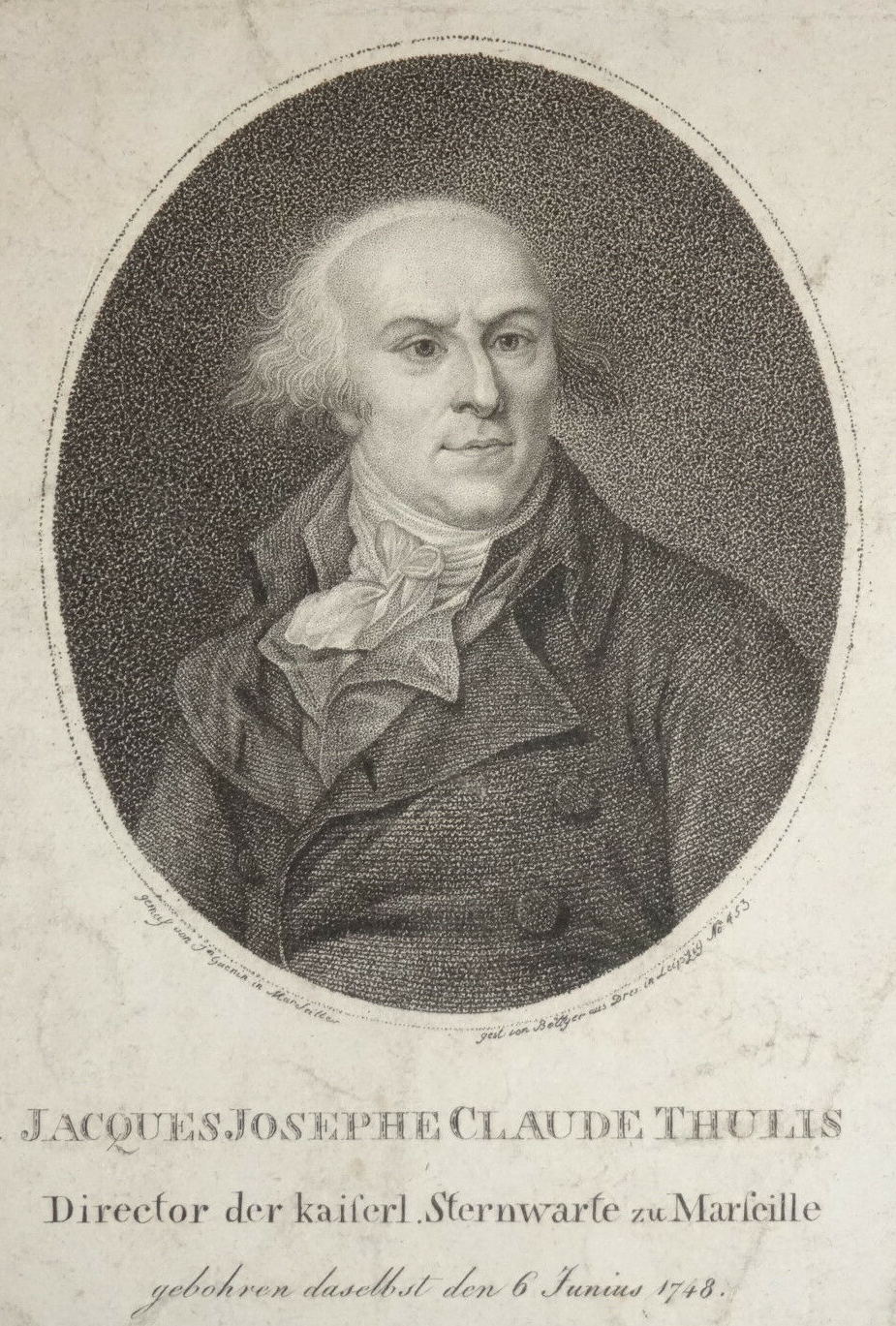
- Born: 6 June 1748; Marseille
- Died: 10 July 1816 (aged 68); Marseille

Jacques Joseph Thulis (born 6 June 1748 in Marseille, died 23 January 1810 in Marseille) was a French astronomer. He was director of Marseille Observatory.

== Biography ==
Jacques Joseph Thulis was born into a family of rich merchants; his father Pierre Thulis and his brother Jean-Baptiste were respectively 2nd alderman in 1753 and 1st alderman in 1788. After studying at the Jesuit college, Joseph was sent to Cairo to manage a branch of his father's company; he stayed there for a little over six years. He returned to Marseille in 1772 and devoted himself to mathematics, physics and astronomy. In 1786 he went to Hyères where an observatory equipped with good English-made facilities had been installed by the Duke of Saxe-Gotha. In the company of the Duke and Franz Xaver von Zach he undertook a trip to Italy to visit the main observatories of this country.

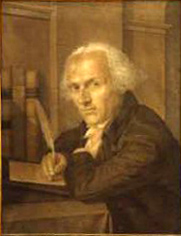
Portrait of Joseph Thulis.

On 20 November 1782 he was elected to the Académie de Marseille. The Marseille Observatory has a graphite drawing representing the portrait of this astronomer.
