= R Virginis =

Star in the constellation Virgo

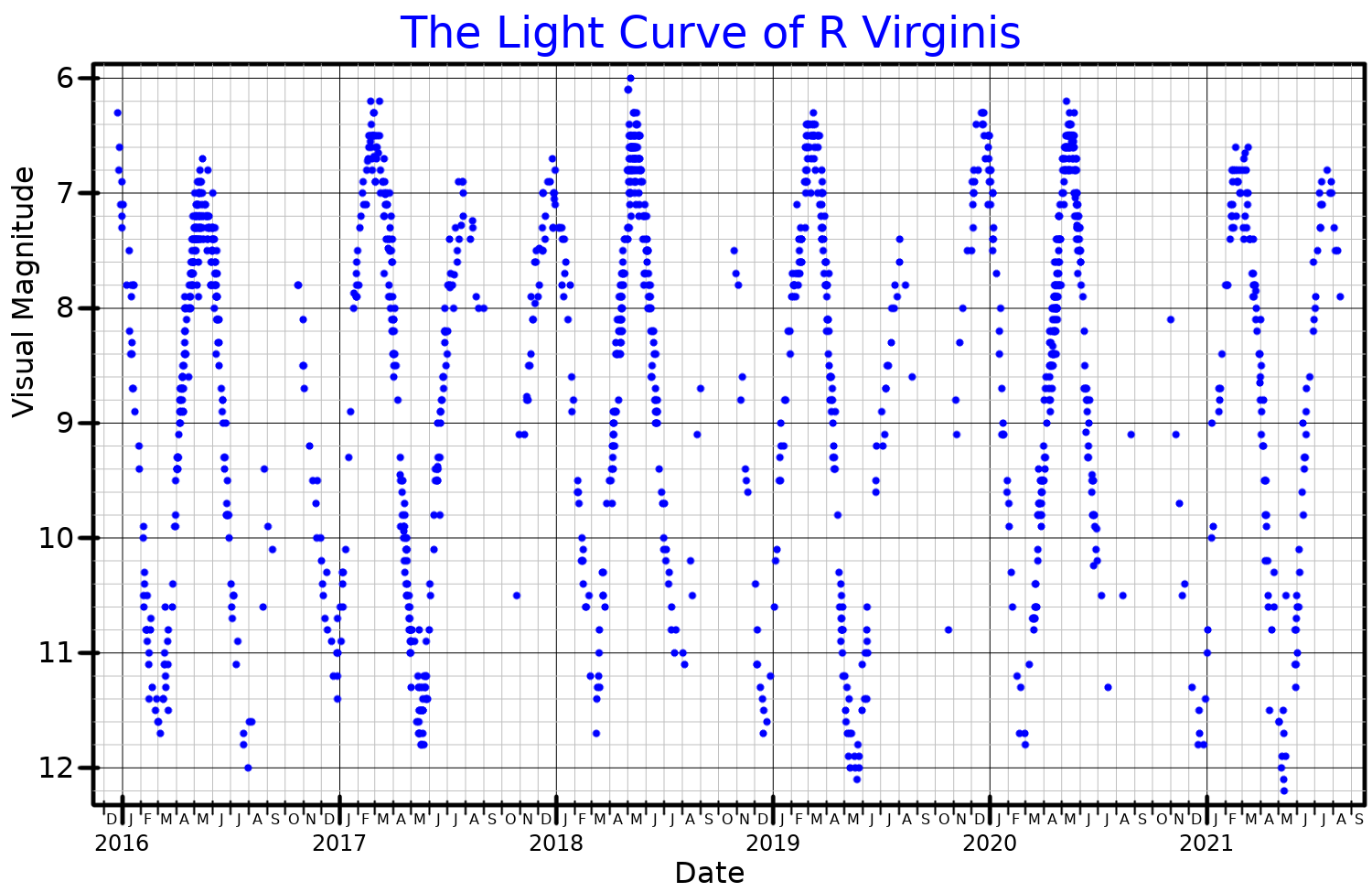
- The visual band light curve of R Virginis, from AAVSO data

Observation data Epoch J2000 Equinox ICRS
- Constellation: Virgo
- Right ascension: 12^{h} 38^{m} 29.9338^{s}
- Declination: +06° 59′ 19.026″
- Apparent magnitude (V): 6.1 - 12.1

Characteristics
- Spectral type: M3.5-7e
- U−B color index: 1.22
- B−V color index: 1.56
- Variable type: Mira

Astrometry
Radial velocity (R_{v})	−26.60 km/s
Proper motion (μ)	RA: −32.283±0.248 mas/yr Dec.: 4.483±0.186 mas/yr
Parallax (π)	1.8884±0.0946 mas
Distance	1,730 ± 90 ly (530 ± 30 pc)

Details
Mass	1.19 M_{☉}
Radius	130 R_{☉}
Surface gravity (log g)	0.34 cgs
Temperature	3,270–3,800 K
Metallicity [Fe/H]	+0.29 dex

Other designations
- R Virginis, TYC 295-2-1, AG+07°1658, HD 109914, BD+07°2561, DO 3264, HIP 61667, GC 17212, HR 4808, RAFGL 4157, SAO 119509

Database references
SIMBAD	data

R Virginis is a Mira variable in the constellation Virgo. Located approximately 530 parsecs (1,700 ly) distant, it varies between magnitudes 6.1 and 12.1 over a period of approximately 146 days. Its variable nature was discovered by Karl Ludwig Harding in 1809.
