= 999 Zachia =

Main-belt asteroid

Discovery
- Discovered by: K. Reinmuth
- Discovery site: Heidelberg
- Discovery date: 9 August 1923

Designations
- Alternative designations: 1923 NW

Orbital characteristics
- Epoch 31 July 2016 (JD 2457600.5)
- Uncertainty parameter 0
- Observation arc: 92.68 yr (33850 days)
- Aphelion: 3.1787 AU (475.53 Gm)
- Perihelion: 2.0450 AU (305.93 Gm)
- Semi-major axis: 2.6118 AU (390.72 Gm)
- Eccentricity: 0.21704
- Orbital period (sidereal): 4.22 yr (1541.8 d)
- Mean anomaly: 352.050°
- Mean motion: 0° 14^{m} 0.6^{s} / day
- Inclination: 9.7603°
- Longitude of ascending node: 214.972°
- Argument of perihelion: 128.034°

Physical characteristics
- Mean radius: 8.95 km
- Synodic rotation period: 22.77 h (0.949 d)
- Geometric albedo: 0.1994±0.051
- Absolute magnitude (H): 10.8

999 Zachia is a main-belt asteroid that was discovered by German astronomer Karl W. Reinmuth in 1923 and named after Hungarian astronomer Franz Xaver von Zach.

Photometric observations of this asteroid collected during 1999 show a rotation period of 22.77 ± 0.03 hours with a brightness variation of 0.3 magnitude.
