= Karl Felix Seyffer =

German astronomer (1762–1822)

Karl Felix (von) Seyffer (25 January 1762 in Bitzfeld (now Bretzfeld), Duchy of Württemberg – 17 September 1822 in Bogenhausen (now Munich), Kingdom of Bavaria) was a German astronomer.

== Life and work ==
Karl Felix Seyffer (Note: also written "Carl". Since Günther (1892) named him "von Seyffer" in the German biographic encyclopedia article, this version of the name has been the mostly used one, but Seyffer wrote his name only without "von" in his publications, and there is no indication of any ennoblement; the Bavarian Academy of Science names his former member "Karl Felix Seyffer" (see ref.).) was born in the small village of Bitzfeld in Württemberg on 25 January 1762. He finished his studies at the University of Tübingen with a doctor degree, and became extraordinary professor at the University of Göttingen in the Electorate of Hanover in 1789. There he was the astronomical instructor of Carl Friedrich Gauss. He visited the First European congress of astronomers at the Seeberg observatory in Gotha in 1798.

In 1804, he left Göttingen to become professor at the Bavarian University of Landshut. (Note: In 1826, the university was transferred from Landshut to Munich.) In 1805 and 1806, he worked for a short time in the French headquarter with the title "Ingénieur-Géographe". Then he was appointed as member of the statistic-topographic bureau in Munich, since 1808 as co-director.

The area of the Electorate of Bavaria was considerably enlarged in 1803, (Note: In January 1806, the Electorate of Bavaria was upgraded to a Kingdom.) and the necessity of precise maps was obvious. A survey was to be carried out, and astronomical data were needed, but at that time Munich had no competitive observatory. As a third duty, Seyffer was charged with the planning of a new observatory. He bought some new instruments, and brought them together with already available ones in a provisorical wooden building in the village of Haidhausen near Munich, where a proper installation was not possible. As a consequence of Bavaria's involvement in the Napoleonic Wars, the planning was delayed, and finally stopped completely. The new observatory was eventually constructed not until 1816 in the nearby village of Bogenhausen. Seyffer determined the geographical coordinates of the observatory, and by barometrical measures its height.

Seyffer was seen as a difficult character by his contemporaries, and since 1813 his opponents denounced him as a friend of the French. Under the pretext of "astronomical inactivity" he was replaced as head of the observatory by Johann Georg von Soldner. Seyffer himself became director of the Bavarian topographic bureau since 1815. In this position he became one of the founders of the Bavarian cadastre, the first one of the German states.

Seyffer's main scientific interests were on the fields of survey, geography, and meteorology.

Seyffer died in Bogenhausen on 17 September 1822.

== Honours ==
He was elected as ordinary member of the Bavarian Academy of Sciences in 1804. The Hanoverian government awarded him the honorary title "Hofrath" in 1808. He became Knight of the Legion of Honour in 1809.

== Selected writings ==
- 1794: Bestimmung der Längen von Göttingen, Gotha, Danzig, Berlin, und Harefield (Middlesex) aus der Sonnenfinsterniss vom 5ten September 1793 (in German). Göttingen: Dieterich. 1794.
- 1800: "Über die neuesten Entdeckungen in der Süd-See" [On the newest discoveries in the Pacific]. Monatliche Correspondenz zur Beförderung der Erd- und Himmelskunde (in German). 1: 497–506.
- 1800: "Supplement zu der Entdeckungs-Geschichte der neuen Marquesas-Inseln". Monatliche Correspondenz zur Beförderung der Erd- und Himmelskunde (in German). 1: 566–573.
- 1808: De Altitudine Speculae astronomicae regiae, quae prope Monachium est, supra mare internum, quam mille quingentis Observationibus a se habitis atque ad calculos revocatis mensus est. Denkschriften der königlichen Akademie der Wissenschaften zu München für das Jahr 1808 (in Latin). Munich. pp. 312–340.
- 1808: Super longitudine geographica Speculae astronomicae Regiae, quae Monachii est, ex occultionibus siderum inerrantium a se observatis et ad calculo revocatis nunc primum definita. Denkschriften der königlichen Akademie der Wissenschaften zu München für das Jahr 1808 (in Latin). Munich. pp. 341–374.
- 1810: Super longitudine geographica Speculae astronomicae Regiae, quae Monachii est, ex triginta septem defectionibus solis observatis, et ad calculos nunc primum definita. Denkschriften der königlichen Akademie der Wissenschaften zu München für das Jahr 1809 (in Latin). Munich. pp. 415–516.
- 1813: De Positu Basis et Retis Triangulorum impensa Regis per totam Bojoariam porrectorum ad meridianum speculae astronomicae Regiae relato azimuthis observatis et ad calculos revocatis, nunc primum definito. Denkschriften der königlichen Akademie der Wissenschaften zu München für das Jahr 1811–1812 (in Latin). Munich. pp. 449–521.
- 1813: Elementa et phaenomena Eclipsis Lunae totalis d. Februarii 1812 mane observandae ad Calculos revocavit (PDF). Denkschriften der königlichen Akademie der Wissenschaften zu München für das Jahr 1813 (in Latin). Munich. pp. 357–360.
- 1813: Elementa et phaenomena defectionis solis calendis Februarii MDCCCXIII, ad horizontem et meridianum speculae Regis astronomicae ad calculos revocavit (PDF). Denkschriften der königlichen Akademie der Wissenschaften zu München für das Jahr 1813 (in Latin). Munich. pp. 361––364.

== Sources ==
- Saalfeld, Friedrich (1820). Geschichte der Universität Göttingen in dem Zeitraum von 1788 bis 1820 (in German). Hanover: Helwingsche Buchhandlung. pp. 209–210.
- Meusel, Johann Georg (1825). Das gelehrte Teutschland im neunzehnten Jahrhundert (in German). Vol. 8. Lemgo: Meyersche Hof-Buchhandlung. pp. 456–457.
- Günther, Siegmund (1892). Seyffer, Karl Felix von. Allgemeine Deutsche Biographie (in German). Vol. 34. Leipzig: Duncker & Humblot. pp. 107–108.
