= Dechen (crater) =

Crater on the Moon

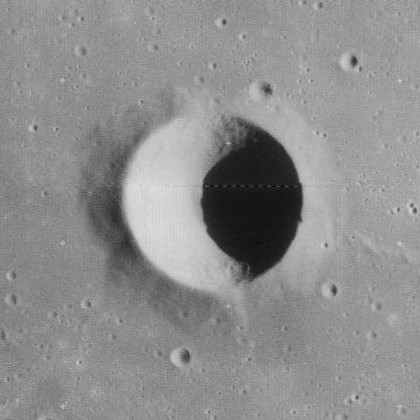
- Lunar Orbiter 4 image
- Coordinates: 46.1°N 68.2°W
- Diameter: 12.04 km (7.48 mi)
- Depth: Unknown
- Colongitude: 68° at sunrise
- Eponym: Ernst H. K. von Dechen

Dechen is a small, bowl-shaped crater that is located in the northwest part of the Oceanus Procellarum, near the northwest limb of the Moon. The rim of the crater projects slightly above the surrounding lunar mare, and the interior is symmetrical and nearly featureless. It lies to the northeast of the crater Harding, but is otherwise relatively isolated.

This formation is named after German geologist and mineralogist Ernst Heinrich Karl von Dechen (1800-1889). His name was included in the lunar nomenclature of German astronomer J. F. Julius Schmidt in 1878. Its designation was formally adopted by the International Astronomical Union in 1935.

== Satellite craters ==
By convention these features are identified on lunar maps by placing the letter on the side of the crater midpoint that is closest to Dechen.

Dechen	Latitude	Longitude	Diameter
A	46.0° N	65.7° W	5 km
B	44.2° N	64.3° W	6 km
C	45.9° N	69.9° W	6 km
D	46.2° N	60.5° W	5 km
