= Harding (crater) =

Lunar impact crater

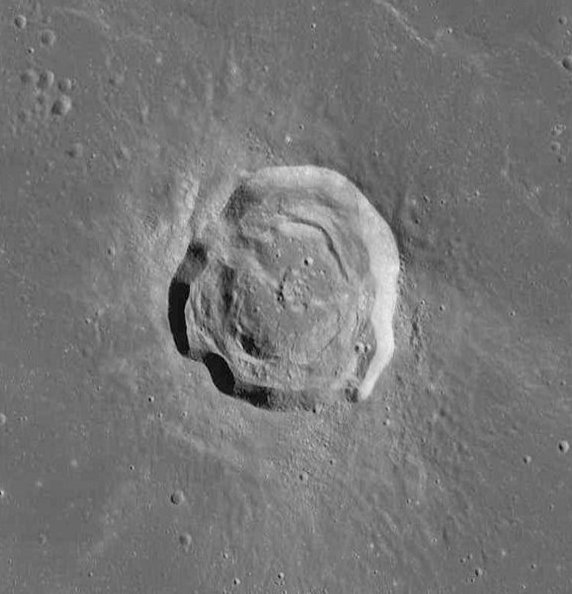
- LRO image
- Coordinates: 43.54°N 71.66°W
- Diameter: 23 km
- Depth: 1.1 km
- Colongitude: 72° at sunrise
- Eponym: Karl L. Harding

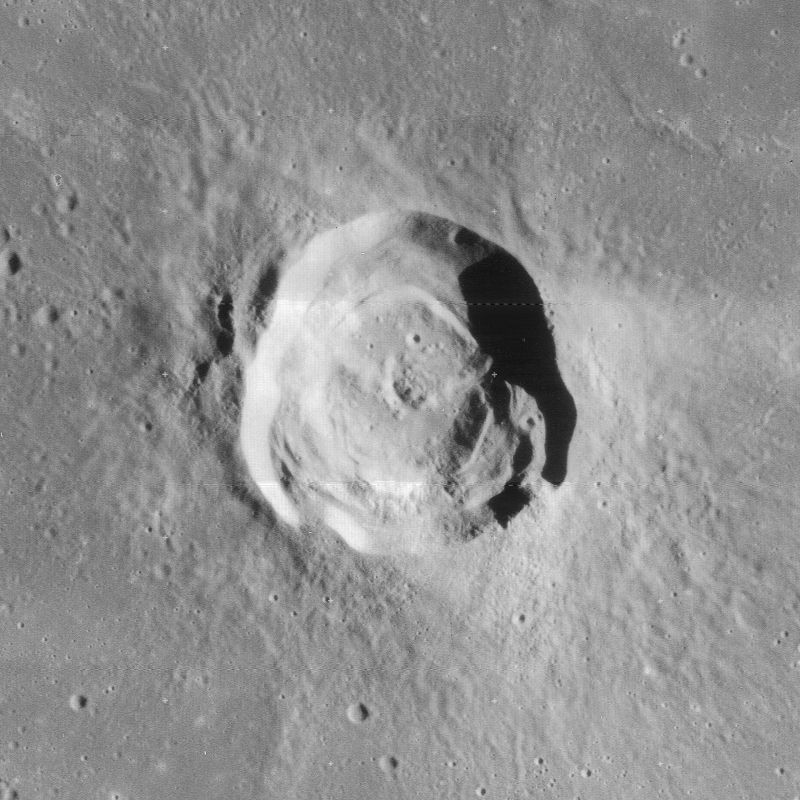
Lunar Orbiter 4 image

Harding is a small lunar impact crater that lies in the Sinus Roris, a bay in the northwest part of the Oceanus Procellarum. Because of its location near the northwest limb of the Moon's near side, this crater is viewed at a relatively low angle from the Earth resulting in foreshortening and limiting the amount of detail that can be seen.

This is an isolated formation, making it relatively easy to find. The nearest craters of note are Gerard, farther to the west, and von Braun to the west-southwest. To the northeast of Harding is the smaller crater Dechen.

The rim of Harding has a sharp edge, and is not quite circular, with slight outward bulges to the north and west, and a somewhat angular corner in the southeast. The inner walls have slumped down, producing a ring of material around the interior floor. There is a slight ridge at the midpoint.

== Satellite craters ==
By convention these features are identified on lunar maps by placing the letter on the side of the crater midpoint that is closest to Harding.

Harding	Latitude	Longitude	Diameter
A	40.4° N	75.5° W	14 km
B	41.9° N	76.3° W	17 km
C	42.4° N	74.7° W	8 km
D	42.9° N	67.7° W	7 km
H	40.8° N	64.4° W	6 km

== See also ==
- 2003 Harding, main-belt asteroid
