= Julius August Koch =

German astronomer and physician

Julius August Koch (born 15 June 1752 in Osnabrück; died 21 October 1817 in Gdańsk) was a German astronomer and physician.

He studied medicine as main subject in Göttingen and Straßburg, his secondary subjects were mathematics and astronomy. After his doctorate he settled as general practitioner in Osnabrück.

On recommendation by his former instructor Georg Christoph Lichtenberg, the Danzig Research Society, appointed him astronomer at its observatory on Gdansk's Biskupia Górka, which had been founded in 1783 by Nathanael Matthaeus von Wolf.

Living through the second siege of Danzig (1813, after 1807) his health suffered and he died three years after the siege ended.

Koch was among the first astronomers to study the variability of stars. In 1782 he discovered R Leonis, a variable star with long period and large amplitude, which was not always visible to the naked eye. Further discoveries were variables in the constellations of Hercules, Corona Borealis and Scutum. In Johann Elert Bode's Berliner Astronomisches Jahrbuch for 1817 his table of all variable stars known by 1815 with known periods (Tafel aller 1815 bekannten veränderlichen Sterne, deren Lichtwechselperioden bestimmt worden sind) was published.

As addition to Bode's tables, he published in 1797 in Berlin and Stralsund, Astronomische Tafeln zur Bestimmung der Zeit aus der beobachteten gleichen, obwol unbekannten Höhe zweyer Fixsterne (astronomical tables for the determination of time from the observation of two stars of equal, but unknown, altitude), which proved very useful for mariners.

Already in Bode's Jahrbuch for 1794 did he discuss the question, whether comets could be observed at aphelion.
