= Magi astrology =

System of doing astrology

Magi astrology is a system of astrology introduced to the public by the Magi Society, its originator, through its three books published from 1995 to 1999. The Magi Society is an international association of astrologers. Magi Astrology is one of the various recognized techniques used by astrologers for interpreting charts.

The basic principles of Magi astrology were initially published in 1995 in the book Astrology Really Works! and further elaborated in the subsequent titles The Magi Society Ephemeris (1950–1999) Including Secrets of Magi Astrology (1996) and Magi Astrology: The Key to Success in Love and Money (1999), all published by Hay House.

Magi astrology differs from other astrological techniques because exact birth times are not necessary to do competent astrology within the Magi astrology system. While having an exact birth time is helpful, it is not crucial to providing accurate astrological information.

== Bibliography ==
- Astrology Really Works, Hay House Inc., 1995, ISBN 1-56170-134-3
- The Magi Society Ephemeris Including Secrets of Magi Astrology, Hay House Inc., 1997, ISBN 1-56170-331-1
- Magi Astrology: The Key to Success In Love and Money, Hay House Inc., ISBN 1-56170-128-9
