= Johann Jakob Huber =

Swiss astronomer (1733–1798)

Johann Jakob Huber (27 August 1733, Basel – 21 August 1798, Gotha) was a Swiss astronomer.

== Life and work ==
Huber was the eldest of two sons born to the Basle trader Johann Jakob Huber (1704–1759) and his first wife Anna Maria Winkelblech (1706–1736). He studied at the usual Basle schools. His father had originally envisioned a career for his eldest son similar to his own, but as he showed early on his inclination towards mathematics and astronomy, he allowed him to receive a correspondingly suitable education. Among his university lecturers in his home town of Basle were the mathematicians Daniel Bernoulli and Johann II. Bernoulli.

In 1754, Huber was an astronomer at the Royal Greenwich Observatory. From 1754 to 1755, he undertook a scientific sojourn through England. During this trip, he wrote on 19 October 1754, in Croydon, an essay on the determination of longitude at sea, containing thoughts on a particular part that a mechanical clock needs to have an escapement with constant force. During a visit to the University of Oxford in Spring 1755 to hear a lecture by James Bradley, he handed this memorandum over to him. As Bradley was impressed by the work and found the described escapement simpler than that of John Harrison, Huber gave a contract to the clockmaker Thomas Mudge for a model of his innovation.

In 1756, Huber was called to Potsdam by Friedrich II. and became there Professor and astronomer of the Akademie der Wissenschaften. On 15 January 1756 he became an ordentliches Member. In the same year he took on the job of Direktor of the Berlin Observatory. Because of the sub-standard equipment he gave the post up in 1758 and returned home to Basle. Since 27 January 1758, he was a foreign Member of the academy. In Basle, he married in the same year his second wife, Rosina Rohner (1737–1812) and worked from then on as Private Tutor.

On 21 August 1798, Huber died in Gotha while on a journey to Germany, which led him through Berlin. In the Summer, he had taken part in the First European congress of astronomers at the Gotha Observatory. Huber left five daughters and two sons. His eldest son, also called Johann Jakob Huber (1761–1790), had already died a few years before him. His second-born son, Johann Rudolf Huber (1766–1806), was professor of history and a clergyman. The youngest, Daniel Huber (1768–1829), was a mathematician and also an astronomer.
