= Johann Sigismund Gottfried Huth =

German mathematician and physicist

Johann Sigismund Gottfried Huth (born 2 May 1763 in Roßlau; died 12 March [O.S. 28 February] 1818 in Dorpat) was professor for mathematics and physics.

He studied theology, mathematics and natural history at the Martin Luther University Halle-Wittenberg. Along with Ernst Friedrich Knorre he was among the students of Wenceslaus Johann Gustav Karsten. After Karsten's death in 1787, Huth earned his Dr. phil. on 9 July 1787 in the presence of Johann Christian Foerster.

In 1788 he held private lectures on the basics of algebra based on the text books by Karsten; the following year he became professor for physics and mathematics at the university in Frankfurt (Oder), where around 1799 Heinrich von Kleist was among his students. In 1807 Huth accepted an appointment at the National University of Kharkiv and between 1808 and 1811 laid the foundation of astronomical research there. After Knorre's death, Huth succeeded him at the German-speaking Dorpat University in Estonia (Livonia), where Wilhelm von Struve was first his student and later his assistant at the observatory. Huth is buried in Raadi cemetery.

From 1812 Huth was corresponding member of the Prussian Academy of Sciences.

In Frankfurt, around 1789, he had participated in the acoustic experiments of Christian Ernst Wünsch. In 1796 he proposed an acoustic megaphone system that he called "der Telephon".

From 1801 Huth turned more and more to astronomy. He searched (without success) for the asteroid Ceres, corresponded with William Herschel and travelled around England to familiarise himself with the observatories there. Upon his return he installed an observatory at his home in Frankfurt (Oder), which he also opened up to his students. It was here that he discovered three comets (2P/Encke, 3D/Biela, C/1807 R1) and published his research in the Berliner Astronomisches Jahrbuch. In Kharkiv, the university erected its first observatory according to Huth's designs, although this was completed only after he had left for Dorpat. Due to his chronic bad health, he was unable to carry out observations at the observatory there.
