= Karl Ludwig Harding =

German astronomer

Karl Ludwig Harding FRS
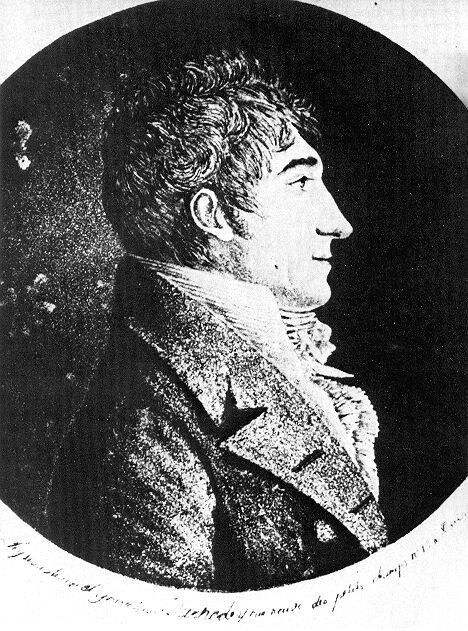
- Harding by Edme Quenedey
- Born: 29 September 1765; Lauenburg/Elbe, Saxe-Lauenburg
- Died: 31 August 1834 (aged 68); Göttingen, Kingdom of Hanover
- Education: University of Göttingen
- Known for: 3 Juno, astronomical discoveries
- Awards: Lalande Prize

Karl Ludwig Harding (29 September 1765 – 31 August 1834) was a German astronomer, who discovered Juno, the third asteroid of the main-belt in 1804.

== Life and career ==
Harding was born in Lauenburg. From 1786–1789, he was educated at the University of Göttingen, where he studied theology, mathematics, and physics. In 1796, Johann Hieronymus Schröter hired Harding as a tutor for his son. Schröter was an enthusiastic astronomer and owner of a well-equipped observatory in Lilienthal near Bremen, where Harding was soon appointed observer and inspector.

In 1800, he was among the 24 astronomers invited to participate in the celestial police, a group dedicated to finding additional planets in the Solar System. As part of the group, in 1804, Harding discovered Juno at Schröter's observatory. In the next year he left Lilienthal, where his successor became Friedrich Wilhelm Bessel, as he was appointed extraordinary professor of astronomy at the University of Göttingen, since 1812 as ordinary professor. He worked at Göttingen Observatory, since 1807 as colleague of Carl Friedrich Gauss, until his sudden death in 1834.

In addition to Juno, he discovered three comets and the variable stars R Virginis, R Aquarii, R Serpentis and S Serpentis. Furthermore, he found some new nebulae, among them being the Helix Nebula or "the Eye of God". His main opus was the Atlas novus coelestis, the first star atlas without splendid but confusing mythological figures.

== Honours and awards ==
Harding was corresponding member of the Royal Academy of Sciences in Göttingen since 1803 and full member since 1806, corresponding member of the French Academy of Sciences since 1810, elected as member of the Royal Society in London in 1806, and associate member of the Royal Astronomical Society since 1821. From the government he was awarded the title "Hofrath" (Councillor of the court).

In 1804, he was awarded the Lalande Prize.

The lunar crater Harding and the asteroid 2003 Harding are named in his honor.

== Works ==
Minor planets discovered: 1
| 3 Juno | 1 September 1804 | MPC |

- Atlas novus coelestis (1808–1823; re-edited by Jahn, 1856) which catalogued 120,000 stars
- Kleine astronomische Ephemeriden (edited with Wiessen, 1830–35)
- Hora XV and XXIII of the series Berliner Akademische Sternkarten (Berlin Academic Star Charts) (1826, 1830)
