= Daniel Melanderhjelm =

Swedish mathematician & astronomer (1726–1810)

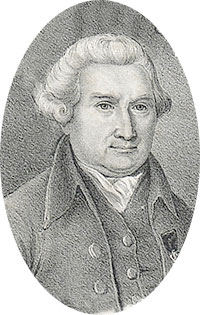
- Born: 29 October 1726; Stockholm
- Died: 8 January 1810 (aged 83); Stockholm

Daniel Melander, knighted Melanderhjelm, (29 October 1726 – 8 January 1810) was a Swedish mathematician and astronomer, professor and rector of Uppsala University, secretary of the Royal Swedish Academy of Sciences and councillor (Swedish: kansliråd).

== Biography ==
Daniel Melander's father Simon Melander was a school headmaster in Stockholm and vicar in Enköping and Gävle, and a descendant of Archbishop Olaus Martini from Bureätten. His mother was Justina Margaretha Djurberg who was the daughter of Daniel Djurberg and Margaretha Theel.

The father's wish was that Daniel Melander would become a vicar like himself, but after the son studied Euclid with Samuel Klingenstierna, he changed the focus of his studies. He became a student at Uppsala University in 1740, master of philosophy in 1752, lecturer in mathematical physics the same year, assistant professor of physics in 1757, professor of astronomy in 1761. He was knighted in 1778 with the name Melanderhjelm. He was given leave of absence in 1782 and was called to Stockholm in 1788 to assist with the organization of the Royal Swedish Academy of War Sciences. In 1796 or 1797 he was appointed secretary of the Royal Swedish Academy of Sciences and remained in the post until 1803. In 1801 he received the title of councillor (kansliråds). Melanderhjelm was a member of the Royal Society of Sciences in Uppsala, the Academy of Sciences (1765), the Royal Swedish Academy of Letters, History and Antiquities (1780) and the Royal Swedish Academy of War Sciences.

He was married to his cousin Margaretha Katarina Frondin, daughter of chamber councillor Professor Elias Frondin and Gunilla Rommel, and sister of Berge Frondin. He survived both his wife and children, so that his family line ended in 1810. He is buried in Uppsala Cathedral.

=== Work as astronomer ===
Melanderhjelm published widely on astronomy. To support academic teaching, he published Conspectus praelectionum academicarum continens fundamenta astronomiae (1779), which was later published in a somewhat revised and expanded form in Swedish under the title Astronomie (1795). Its Latin edition was also used abroad well into the 19th century. His more scientific works were mainly on celestial mechanics, especially the general theory of the Solar System and Lunar theory.

In Om den synliga verldens större eller mindre varaktighet (on the greater or lesser duration of the visible world, 1771–1772), Melanderhjelm tried to show that among all possible laws of attraction the actually existing one is the most suitable for the existence of the world system. Among his works on the theory of the Moon was De theoria lunae commentarii (1769), in which, with the theory of gravitation as a starting point, the motion of the Moon is determined, and related problems are solved according to other, partly simpler, methods than those given by Clairaut, Euler and Lagrange. Among the subjects of his other writings are transits of Venus, the atmospheres of the planets and the method of determining the equation of time. Melanderhjelm also initiated the 1802 meridian survey in Lapland and wrote the foreword to the account thereof.

=== Work as mathematician ===
Melanderhjelm also wrote several works on pure mathematics. He also tried to support academic teaching in this area and to this end published a new edition of Newton's work on the quadrature of curves, which he provided with notes and additions. In addition, he wrote on integral calculus and the theory for the integration of differential equations; however, his results were somewhat specific and contained only fairly simple substitution formulas.

Melanderhjelm on literary subjects wrote, for example Om nyttan af ett eget de lärdes språk (on the benefit of one's own language).
