= Johann Friedrich Wurm =

German astronomer

Johann Friedrich Wurm (19 January 1760 in Nürtingen – 23 April 1833 in Stuttgart) was a German teacher and astronomer.

== Life ==
Wurm was the son of the pastor Gottlieb Friedrich Wurm (1733–1803) (Note: The Wurm dynasty of pastors in Württemberg began with Gottlieb Friedrich Wurm and continued uninterruptedly up to the Landesbischof Theophil Wurm.) and the administrator's daughter Beate Christiana Wolff (1736–1760). His father was preceptor at the Latin school in Nürtingen. After the death of his first wife, Johann Friedrich's mother, his father married Johanna Katharina Ziegler on 4 November 1760. He had six children with her. Wurm's father taught him the ancient languages, so that Johann Friedrich was able to join the seminar in Denkendorf in 1774 and that in Maulbronn in 1776. In 1778 he enrolled at the University of Tübingen to study theology. After completing his studies in 1783, he worked as a vicar for his father, among others.

From 1788 to 1797 he was preceptor at the Latin school in Nürtingen, then pastor in Gruibingen. From 1800 he was professor of Greek and Latin as well as mathematics at the Blaubeuren high school, and from 1807 in Stuttgart. He retired in 1824 due to an eye disease.

In 1797 he was elected a corresponding member of the Göttingen Academy of Sciences and Humanities, and in 1809 he was admitted to the Bavarian Academy of Sciences and Humanities with the same status.

=== Family ===
On 29 July 1788, Wurm married Christiane Luise Friederike Liesching (1767–1814) in Sielmingen, with whom he had three children.

His sons also underwent theological training. Julius Friedrich Wurm (1791–1839) was initially a professor at the seminar in Blaubeuren, and from 1833 he was the town priest in Waldenbuch. Christian Friedrich Wurm (1803–1859) also studied theology before discovering his calling as a high school teacher and historical-political journalist. Although he had found his second home in Hamburg, and was sent from there to the Frankfurt Pre-Parliament in 1848, he returned to Württemberg for a short time. While visiting relatives in the Neckarkreis, he was nominated as a candidate for the constituent National Assembly and became a member of the Frankfurt Parliament in 1849.

== Astronomy ==
Wurm wrote numerous publications, for example in the specialist magazine founded by Franz Xaver von Zach. He also published Geschichte des neuen Planeten Uranus (history of the new planet Uranus, Gotha 1791) and Praktische Anleitung zur Parallaxenberechnung (practical instructions for parallax calculation, Tübingen 1804). He was a participant in the first European astronomers' congress in Gotha in 1798. He was also one of the first astronomers to study variable stars. He determined the period of Algol to be 2 days, 20 hours, 48 minutes, 58 seconds.

His linguistic training enabled him to write the article Beiträge zur Astronomie der Araber (contributions to the astronomy of the Arabs, 1811).

He refuted Johann Albrecht Bengel, who had calculated the return of Christ for 18 June 1836 (J. A. Bengel's Cyclus oder der astronomische Theil von dessen apokalyptischem Systeme gemeinverständlich dargestellt (cycle or the astronomical part of his apocalyptic system presented in a commonly understandable way), Stuttgart 1831; Ueber die Beweisgründe für Bengel’s apokalyptische Zeitrechnung (n the evidentiary reasons for Bengel's apocalyptic time calculation, ibid. 1832).
