= Franz Xaver von Zach =

Austrian astronomer (1754–1832)

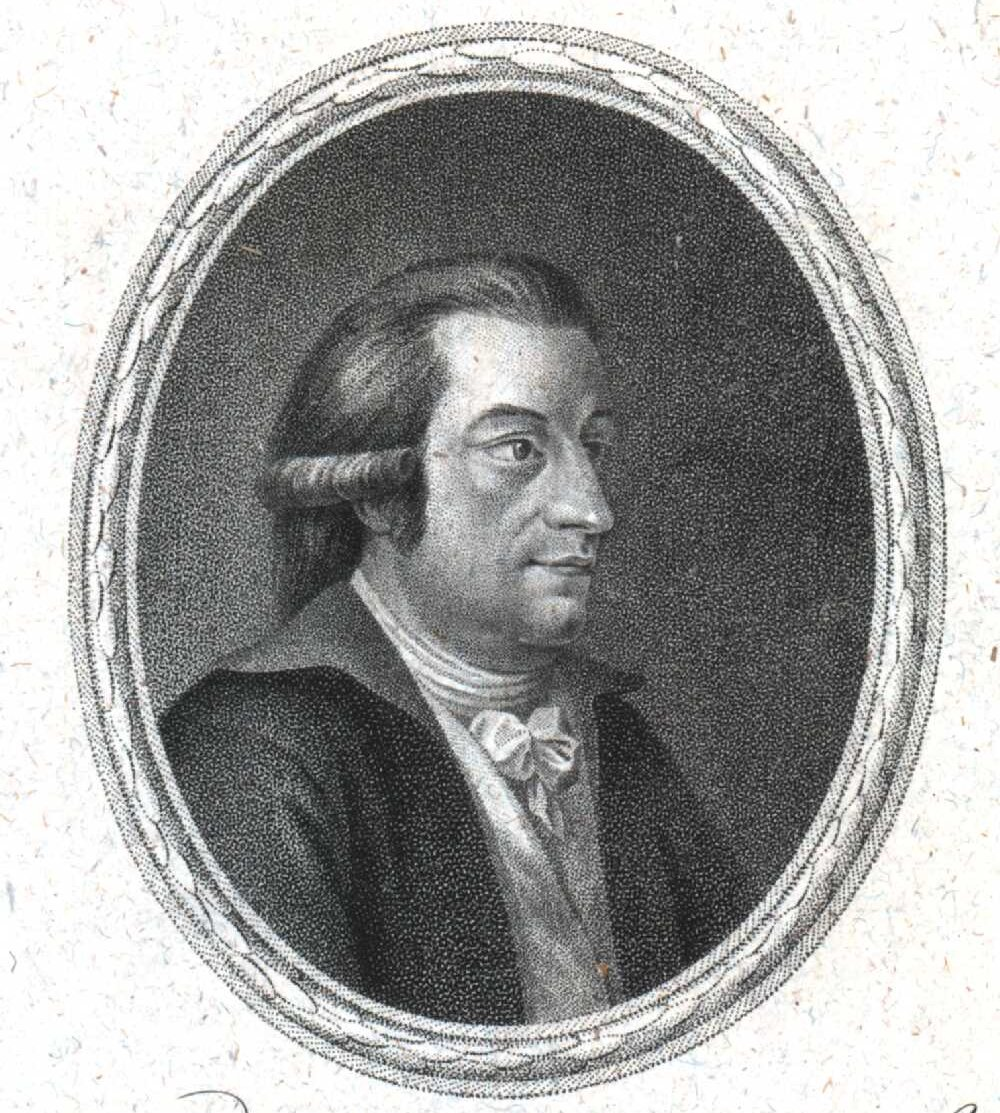
- Born: 4 June 1754; Pest, Austrian Empire
- Died: 2 September 1832 (aged 78); Paris, Kingdom of the French
- Scientific career
- Fields: astronomy

Baron Franz Xaver von Zach (Franz Xaver Freiherr von Zach; 4 June 1754 – 2 September 1832) was an Austrian astronomer born in Pest, Hungary (now Budapest).

== Biography ==
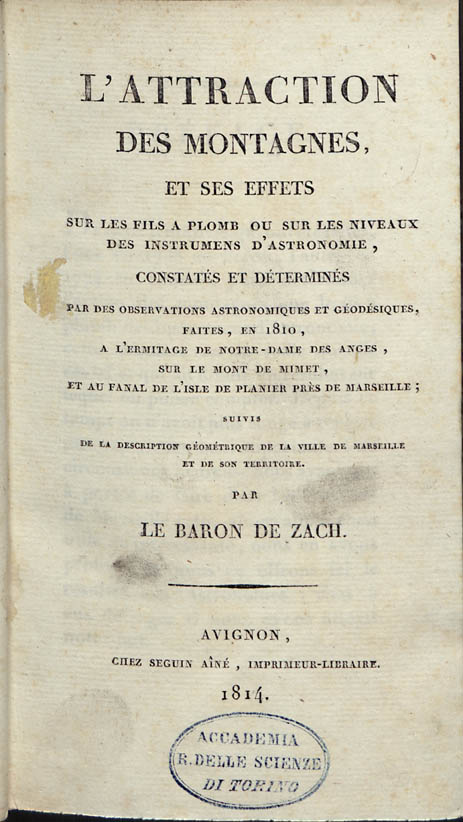
L'attraction des montagnes, 1814

Zach studied physics at the Royal University of Pest, and served for some time in the Austrian army. He taught at the University of Lemberg (now Lviv, Ukraine) and worked in its observatory. He lived in Paris in 1780–83, and in London from 1783 to 1786 as tutor in the house of the Saxon ambassador, Hans Moritz von Brühl. In Paris and London he entered the circles of astronomers like Jérôme Lalande, Pierre-Simon Laplace and William Herschel. In 1786 he was appointed by Ernest II, Duke of Saxe-Gotha-Altenburg director of the new observatory on Seeberg hill at Gotha, which was finished in 1791. At the close of the 18th century, he organised the first European congress of astronomers in 1798 and established the "celestial police", a group of twenty-four astronomers, to prepare for a systematic search for the "missing planet" predicted by the Titius–Bode law between Mars and Jupiter. Ceres was discovered by accident just as the search was getting underway. Using predictions made of the position of Ceres by Carl Friedrich Gauss, on 31 December 1801/1 January 1802, Zach (and, independently one night later, Heinrich Wilhelm Matthias Olbers) recovered Ceres after it was lost during its passage behind the Sun. After the death of the duke in 1804, Zach accompanied the duke's widow on her travels in the south of Europe, and the two settled in Genoa in 1815 where he directed an observatory. He moved back to Paris in 1827 and died there in 1832.

Zach published Tables of the Sun (Gotha, 1792; new and improved edition, Gotha, 1804), and numerous papers on geographical subjects, particularly on the geographical positions of many towns and places, which he determined on his travels with a sextant.

His principal importance was, however, as editor of three scientific journals of great value: Allgemeine Geographische Ephemeriden (4 vols., Gotha, 1798–1799), Monatliche Correspondenz zur Beförderung der Erd- und Himmels-Kunde (28 vols., Gotha, 1800–1813, from 1807 edited by Bernhard von Lindenau), and Correspondance astronomique, geographique, hydrographique, et statistique (Genoa, 1818–1826, 14 vols., and one number of the 15th, the suppression of which was instigated by the Jesuits).

He was elected as a member of the Royal Swedish Academy of Sciences in 1794, a Foreign Honorary Member of the American Academy of Arts and Sciences in 1798, a Fellow of the Royal Society in 1804, and an honorary member of the Hungarian Academy of Sciences in 1832.

In 1808, von Zach was in Marseille where he observed and explained the phenomenon of the Canigou mountain in eastern Pyrénées which can be seen twice a year from there, 250 km away, by refraction of light.

Asteroid 999 Zachia and the crater Zach on the Moon are named after him, while asteroid 64 Angelina is named after an astronomical station he set up near Marseille.

== Works ==
- Tables abrégées et portatives du soleil (in French). Pisa: Molini & Landi & C. 1809.
- Mémoire sur le degré du méridien mesuré en Piemont par le père Beccaria (in French). 1810.
- Attraction des montagnes, et ses effets sur les fils a plomb ou sur les niveaux des instrumens d'astronomie (in French). Avignon: François Seguin (2.). 1814.
