= 3 Juno =

Stony main-belt asteroid

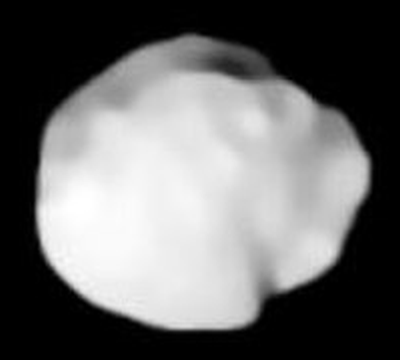
- VLT-SPHERE image of Juno

Discovery
- Discovered by: Karl Ludwig Harding
- Discovery date: 1 September 1804

Designations
- Pronunciation: /ˈdʒuːnoʊ/ JOO-noh
- Named after: Juno (Latin: Iūno)
- Minor planet category: Main belt (Juno clump)
- Adjectives: Junonian /dʒuːˈnoʊniən/
- Symbol: (historically astronomical, now astrological)

Orbital characteristics
- Epoch 13 September 2023 (JD 2453300.5)
- Aphelion: 3.35 AU (501 million km)
- Perihelion: 1.985 AU (297.0 million km)
- Semi-major axis: 2.67 AU (399 million km)
- Eccentricity: 0.2562
- Orbital period (sidereal): 4.361 yr
- Average orbital speed: 17.93 km/s
- Mean anomaly: 37.02°
- Inclination: 12.991°
- Longitude of ascending node: 169.84°
- Time of perihelion: 13 August 2027
- Argument of perihelion: 247.74°
- Earth MOID: 1.04 AU (156 million km)

Proper orbital elements
- Proper semi-major axis: 2.6693661 AU
- Proper eccentricity: 0.2335060
- Proper inclination: 13.2515192°
- Proper mean motion: 82.528181 deg / yr
- Proper orbital period: 4.36215 yr (1593.274 d)
- Precession of perihelion long.: 43.635655 arcsec / yr
- Precession of asc. node: −61.222138 arcsec / yr

Physical characteristics
- Dimensions: (288 × 250 × 225) ± 5 km
- Mean diameter: 254±2 km
- Mass: (2.719±0.018)×10^{19} kg (2025) (Note: Calculated from its standard gravitational parameter GM = 1.815±0.012 km^{3}/s^{2}.) (2.75±0.05)×10^{19} kg (2023)
- Mean density: 3.17±0.08 g/cm^{3} (2025); 3.20±0.10 g/cm^{3} (2023)
- Equatorial surface gravity: 0.113 m/s^{2} (0.0115 g_{0})
- Equatorial escape velocity: 0.169 km/s
- Synodic rotation period: 7.209531±0.000001 hr
- Equatorial rotation velocity: 31.75 m/s (Note: Calculated based on the known parameters)
- Axial tilt: 60°
- Pole ecliptic longitude: 105° ± 3°
- Pole ecliptic latitude: 18° ± 3°
- Geometric albedo: 0.202; 0.214 ± 0.026
- Temperature: ~163 K max: 301 K (+28°C)
- Spectral type: S
- Apparent magnitude: 7.4 to 11.55
- Absolute magnitude (H): 5.19; 5.31
- Angular diameter: 0.30" to 0.07"

Juno (minor-planet designation: 3 Juno) is a large asteroid in the asteroid belt. Juno was the third asteroid discovered, in 1804, by German astronomer Karl Harding. It is tied with three other asteroids as the thirteenth largest asteroid, and it is one of the two largest stony (S-type) asteroids, along with 15 Eunomia. And it is estimated to contain 1% of the total mass of the asteroid belt.

== History ==
=== Discovery ===
Juno was discovered on 1 September 1804, by Karl Ludwig Harding. It was the third asteroid discovered at the time, but it was initially considered to be a planet; then Juno was reclassified as an asteroid and minor planet during the 1850s.

=== Name and symbol ===
Juno is named after the mythological Juno, the highest Roman goddess. The adjectival form is Junonian (from Latin: jūnōnius), with the historical final n of the name (still seen in the French form, Junon) reappearing, analogous to Pluto: Plutonian. Juno is the international name for the asteroid, subject to local variations, such as Italian Giunone, French Junon, and Russian Юнона (Yunona). (Note: There are two exceptions: Greek, where the name was translated to its Hellenic equivalent, Hera (3 Ήρα), as in the cases of 1 Ceres and 4 Vesta; and Chinese, where it is called the 'marriage-god(dess) star' (Chinese: 婚神星; pinyin: hūnshénxīng). This contrasts with the goddess Juno, for which Chinese uses the transliterated Latin name (朱諾; zhūnuò).)

The old astronomical symbol of Juno, still used in astrology, is a scepter topped by a star:. There are many graphic variants with more elaborate scepters, such as, sometimes tilted at an angle to provide more room for decoration. The generic asteroid symbol of a disk with its discovery number (③ for Juno) was introduced in 1852 and quickly became the norm. The scepter symbol was resurrected for astrological use in 1973.

== Characteristics ==
Juno is one of the larger asteroids, perhaps tenth by size and containing approximately 1% the mass of the entire asteroid belt. It is the second-most-massive S-type asteroid after 15 Eunomia. Even so, Juno has only 3% the mass of the largest asteroid, Ceres. The orbital period of Juno is 4.36578 years.

Amongst S-type asteroids, Juno is unusually reflective, which may be indicative of distinctive surface properties. This high albedo explains its relatively high apparent magnitude for a small object not near the inner edge of the asteroid belt. Juno can reach +7.5 at a favourable opposition, which is brighter than Neptune or Titan, and is the reason for it being discovered before the larger asteroids Hygiea, Europa, Davida, and Interamnia. At most oppositions, however, Juno only reaches a magnitude of around +8.7—only just visible with binoculars—and at smaller elongations a 3-inch (76 mm) telescope is required to resolve it. It is the main body in the Juno family.

Juno was originally considered a planet, along with 1 Ceres, 2 Pallas, and 4 Vesta. In 1811, Johann Schröter estimated Juno to be as large as 2290 km in diameter. All four were reclassified as asteroids as additional asteroids were discovered. Juno's small size and irregular shape preclude it from being designated a dwarf planet.

Size comparison: the first 10 asteroids discovered, profiled against Earth's Moon. Juno is third from the left.

Juno orbits at a slightly closer mean distance to the Sun than Ceres or Pallas. Its orbit is moderately inclined at around 12° to the ecliptic, but has an extreme eccentricity, greater than that of Pluto. This high eccentricity brings Juno closer to the Sun at perihelion than Vesta and further out at aphelion than Ceres. It had the most eccentric orbit of any known body until 33 Polyhymnia was discovered in 1854, and of asteroids over 200 km in diameter only 324 Bamberga has a more eccentric orbit.

Juno rotates in a prograde direction with an axial tilt of approximately 60°. The maximum temperature on the surface, directly facing the Sun, was measured at about 293 K on 2 October 2001. Taking into account the heliocentric distance at the time, this gives an estimated maximum temperature of 301 K (+28 °C) at perihelion.

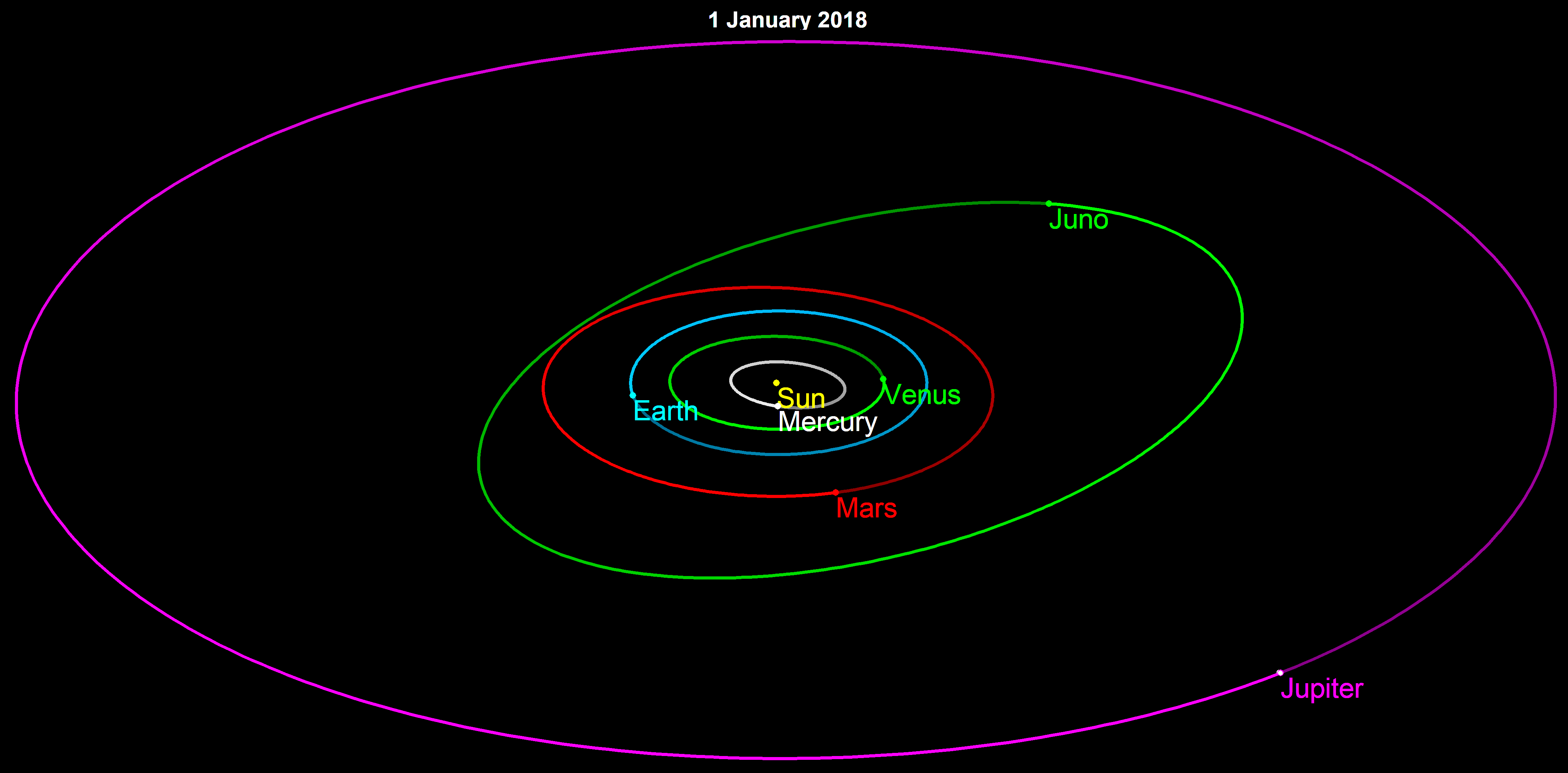
The orbit of Juno is significantly elliptical with a small inclination, moving between Mars and Jupiter

Spectroscopic studies of the Junonian surface permit the conclusion that Juno could be the progenitor of chondrites, a common type of stony meteorite composed of iron-bearing silicates such as olivine and pyroxene. Infrared images reveal that Juno possesses an approximately 100 km-wide crater or ejecta feature, the result of a geologically young impact.

Based on Mid-Infrared Asteroid Spectroscopy (MIDAS) data using the Hale Telescope, an average radius of 135.7 ± 11 km was reported in 2004.

== Observations ==
Juno was the first asteroid for which an occultation was observed. It passed in front of a dim star (SAO 112328) on 19 February 1958. Since then, several occultations by Juno have been observed, the most fruitful being the occultation of SAO 115946 on 11 December 1979, which was registered by 18 observers. It occulted the magnitude 11.3 star PPMX 9823370 on 29 July 2013, and 2UCAC 30446947 on 30 July 2013.

Radio signals from spacecraft in orbit around Mars and on its surface have been used to estimate the mass of Juno from the tiny perturbations induced by it onto the motion of Mars. Juno's orbit appears to have changed slightly around 1839, very likely due to perturbations from a passing asteroid, whose identity has not been determined.

In 1996, Juno was imaged by the Hooker Telescope at Mount Wilson Observatory at visible and near-IR wavelengths, using adaptive optics. The images spanned a whole rotation period and revealed an irregular shape and a dark albedo feature, interpreted as a fresh impact site.

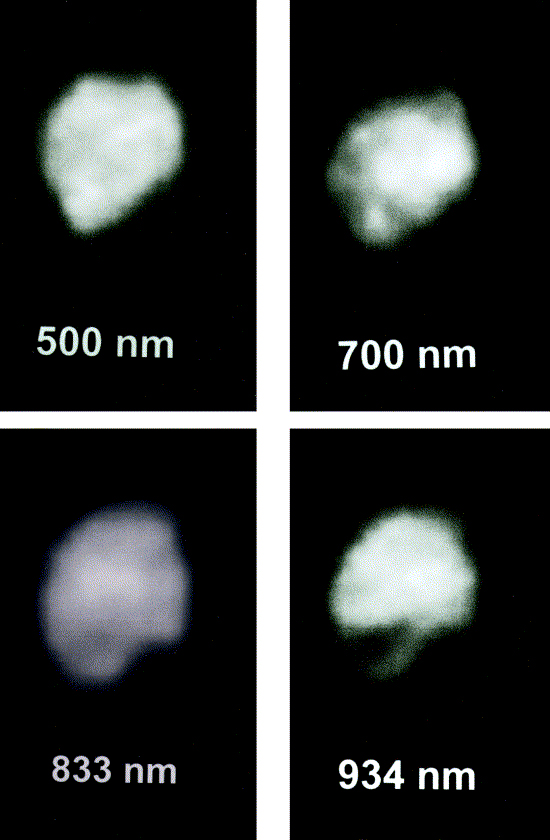
Juno seen at four wavelengths with a large crater in the dark (Hooker telescope, 2003)

Juno moving across background stars

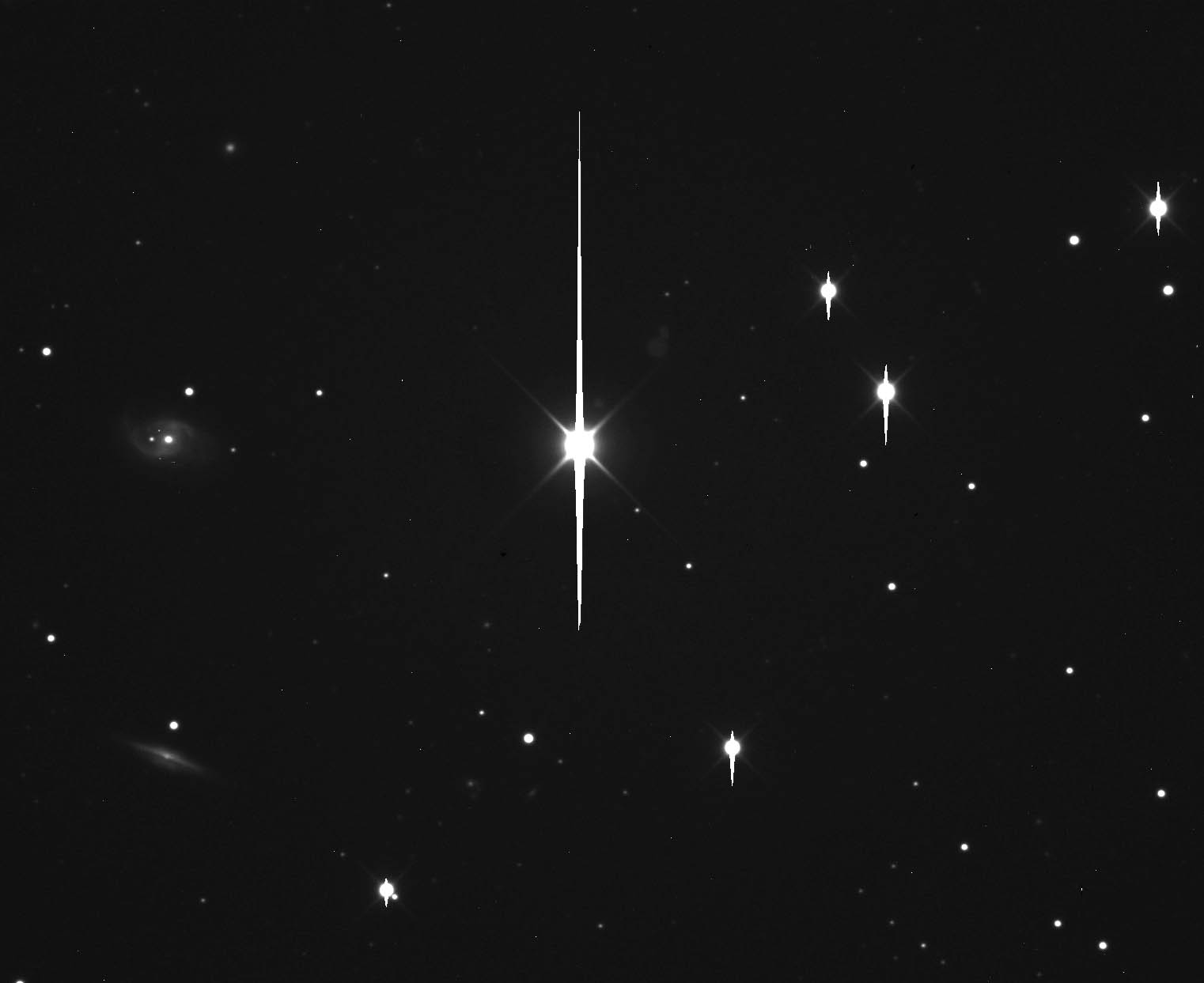
Juno during opposition in 2009

Video of Juno taken as part of ALMA's Long Baseline Campaign

== Oppositions ==
Juno reaches opposition from the Sun every 15.5 months or so, with its minimum distance varying greatly depending on whether it is near perihelion or aphelion. Sequences of favorable oppositions occur every 10th opposition, i.e. just over every 13 years. The last favorable oppositions were on 1 December 2005, at a distance of 1.063 AU, magnitude 7.55, and on 17 November 2018, at a minimum distance of 1.036 AU, magnitude 7.45. The next favorable opposition will be 30 October 2031, at a distance of 1.044 AU, magnitude 7.42.

== See also ==
- Juno clump
- List of former planets
