= Heinrich Wilhelm Matthias Olbers =

German astronomer (1758–1840)

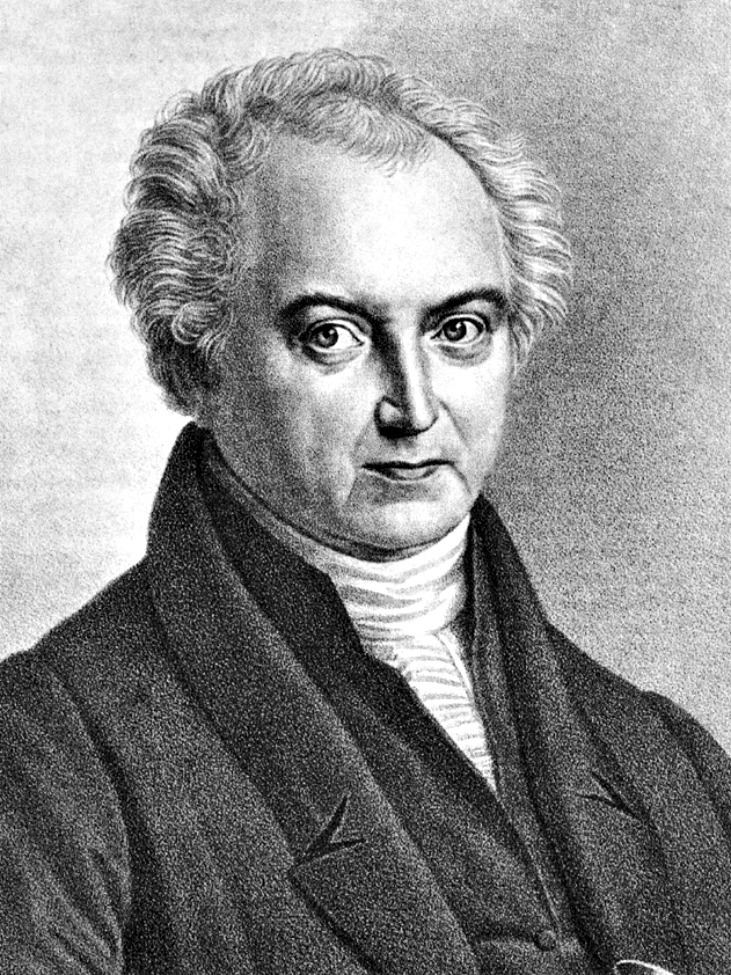
- Lithograph by Rudolph Suhrlandt
- Born: 11 October 1758; Arbergen, Holy Roman Empire
- Died: 2 March 1840 (aged 81); Free Hanseatic City of Bremen, German Confederation
- Known for: Olbers's paradox Pallas; Vesta
- Scientific career
- Fields: Medicine; Astronomy

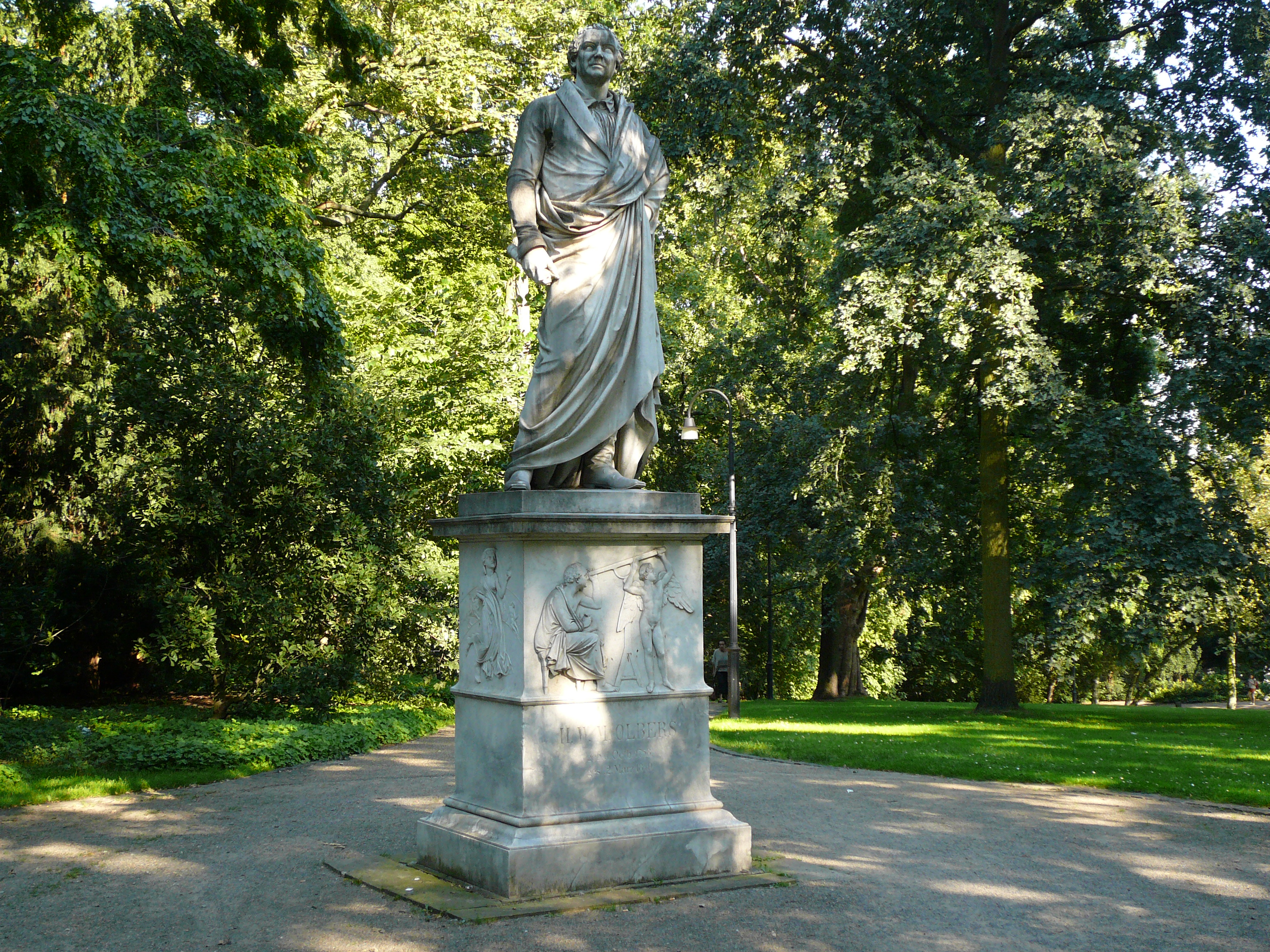
Olbers monument in Bremen by Carl Johann Steinhäuser (1850)

Heinrich Wilhelm Matthias Olbers (/ˈɔːlbərz/; German: [ˈɔlbɐs]; 11 October 1758 – 2 March 1840) was a German astronomer. He found a convenient method of calculating the orbit of comets, and in 1802 and 1807, discovered the second and the fourth asteroids Pallas and Vesta.

== Life and career ==
Olbers was born in Arbergen, Germany, today part of Bremen, and studied to be a physician at Göttingen (1777–1780). While he was at Göttingen, he studied mathematics with Abraham Gotthelf Kästner. In 1779, while attending to a sick fellow student, he devised a method of calculating cometary orbits which made an epoch in the treatment of the subject, as it was the first satisfactory method of calculating cometary orbits. After his graduation in 1780, he began practicing medicine in Bremen. At night he dedicated his time to astronomical observation, making the upper story of his home into an observatory.

In 1800, Olbers was one of 24 astronomers invited to participate in the group known as the "celestial police", dedicated to finding new planets in the Solar System. On 28 March 1802, Olbers discovered and named the asteroid Pallas. Five years later, on 29 March 1807, he discovered the asteroid Vesta, which he allowed Carl Friedrich Gauss to name. As the word "asteroid" was not yet coined, the literature of the time referred to these minor planets as planets in their own right. He proposed that the asteroid belt, where these objects lay, was the remnants of a planet that had been destroyed. The current view of most scientists is that tidal effects from the planet Jupiter disrupted the planet-formation process in the asteroid belt. On 6 March 1815, Olbers discovered a periodic comet, now named after him (formally designated 13P/Olbers). Olbers's paradox, described by him in 1823 (and then reformulated in 1826), states that the darkness of the night sky conflicts with the supposition of an infinite and eternal static universe.

In July 1804, the young Friedrich Wilhelm Bessel contacted Olbers to get his opinion of Bessel's treatise on orbit calculation of Halley's Comet. Olbers noticed the outstanding quality of this work and arranged for its publication.

In 1804, Olbers was elected a Fellow of the Royal Society of London, in 1809, corresponding member living abroad of the Royal Institute of the Netherlands in 1822, a Foreign Honorary Member of the American Academy of Arts and Sciences, and in 1827, a foreign member of the Royal Swedish Academy of Sciences.

Olbers was deputed by his fellow citizens to assist at the baptism of Napoleon II of France on 9 June 1811. He was a member of the corps legislatif in Paris 1812–13. He died in Bremen aged 81. He was twice married, and one son survived him. Olbers's paradox, the argument that the dark sky at night shows that stars cannot be evenly distributed through infinite space, is named for him, though others had also advanced it.

== Honors ==
The following celestial features are named for Olbers:

- The periodic comet 13P/Olbers
- The minor planet 1002 Olbersia
- The lunar crater Olbers
- The albedo feature Olbers on Vesta's surface

There is a statue of Olbers of 1850 in the former rampart area in Bremen.

== Works ==
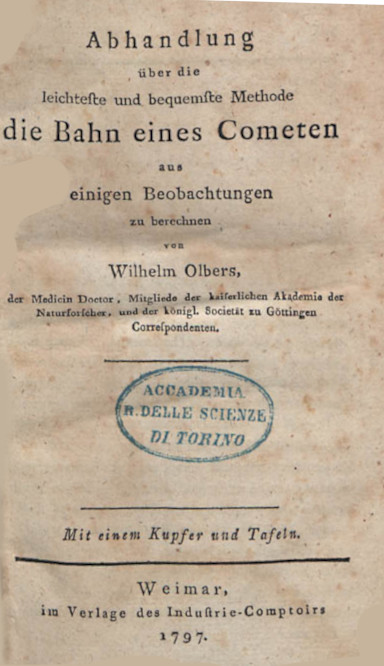
Abhandlung über die leichteste und bequemste Methode die Bahn eines Cometen zu berechnen, 1797

- Abhandlung über die leichteste und bequemste Methode die Bahn eines Cometen zu berechnen (in German). Weimar: Verlag des Industrie-Comptoirs. 1797.
