= Johann Hieronymus Schröter =

German astronomer (1745–1816)

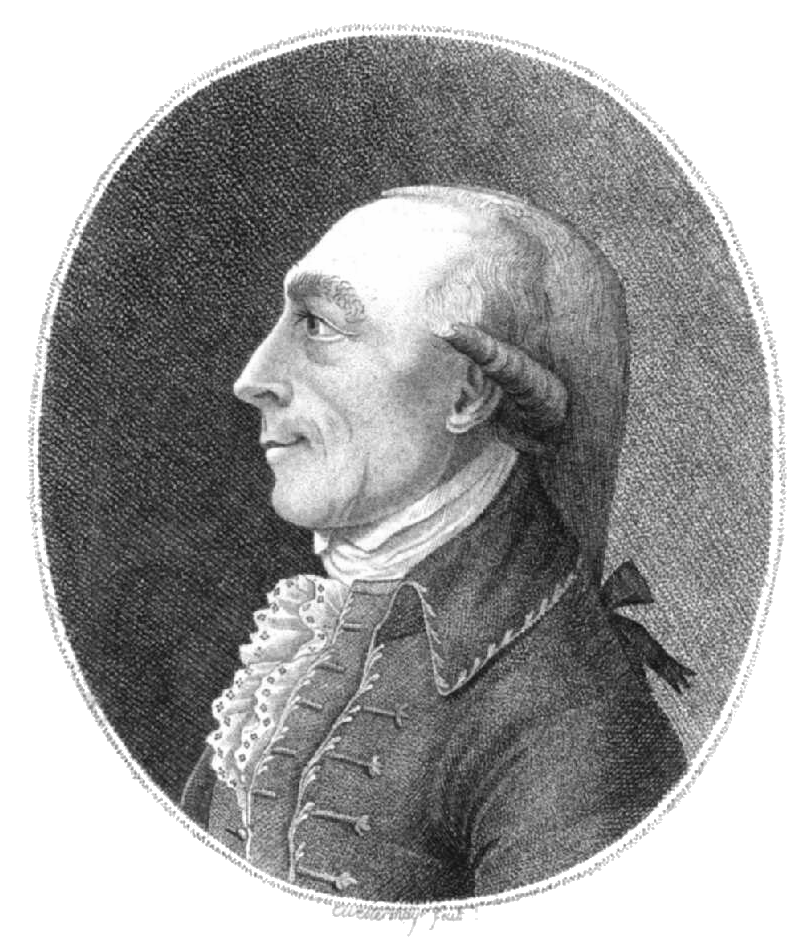
Johann Hieronymus Schröter

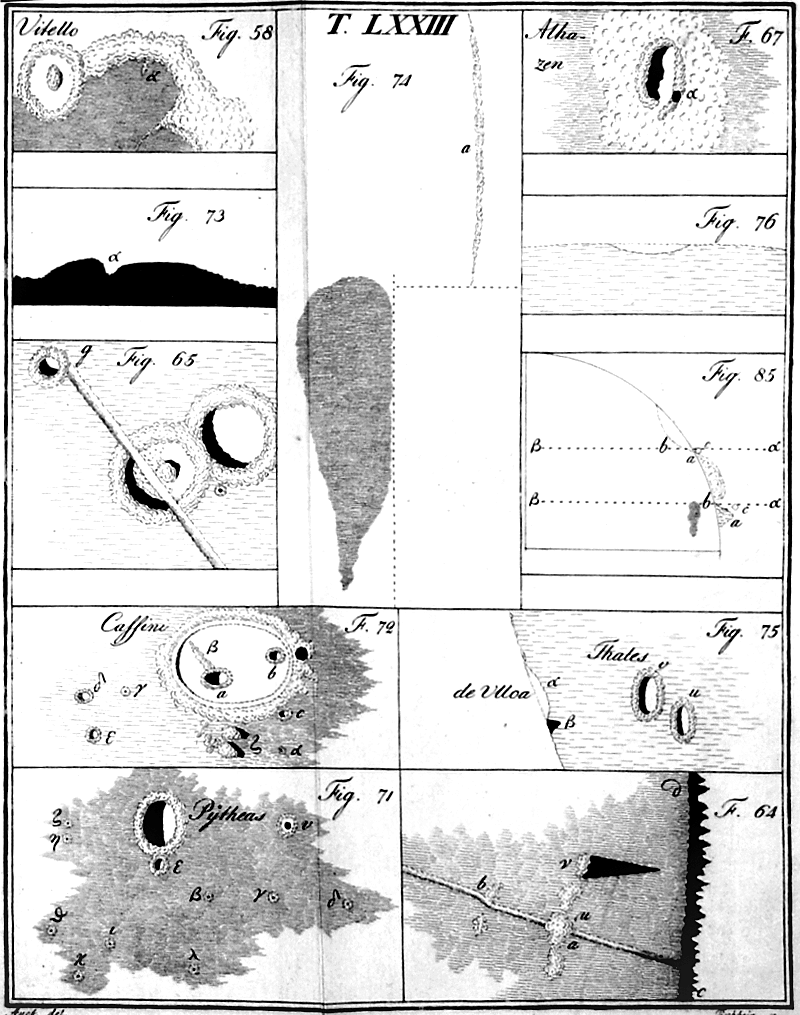
Samples from moon maps in the Selenetopographische Fragmente

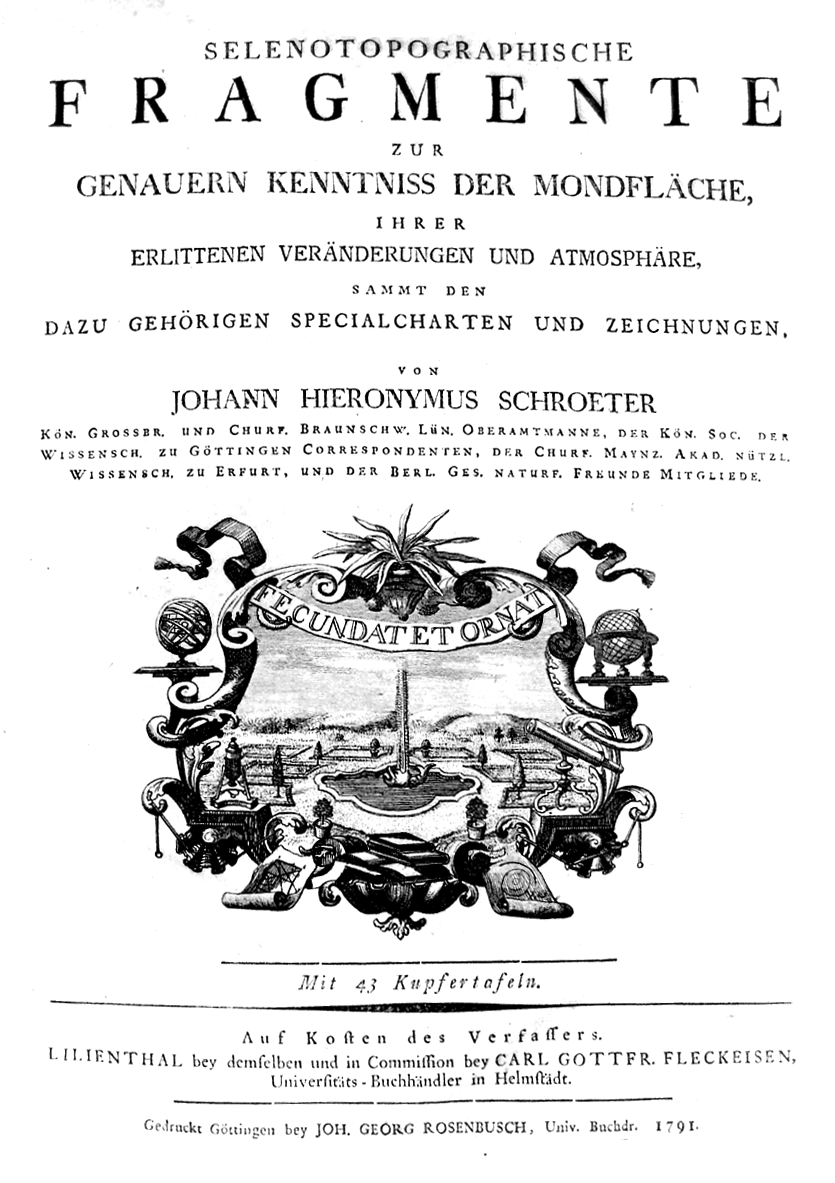
Title page from the Selenetopographische Fragmente

Johann Hieronymus Schröter (30 August 1745, Erfurt – 29 August 1816, Lilienthal) was a German astronomer.

== Life ==
Schröter was born in Erfurt, and studied law at Göttingen University from 1762 until 1767, after which he started a ten-year-long legal practice.

In 1777 he was appointed Secretary of the Royal Chamber of George III in Hanover, where he made the acquaintance of two of William Herschel's brothers. In 1779, he acquired a three-foot-long (91 cm, almost one metre) achromatic refractor with 2.25-inch (57 mm) lens (50 mm) to observe the Sun, Moon, and Venus. Herschel's discovery of Uranus in 1781 inspired Schröter to pursue astronomy more seriously, and he resigned his post and became chief magistrate and district governor of Lilienthal.

In 1784, he paid 31 Reichsthaler (about 600 Euros of today) for a Herschel reflector of 122 cm focal length and 12 cm aperture. He quickly gained a good name from his observational reports in journals, but was not satisfied and in 1786 paid 600 Reichstaler (an equivalent of six months earnings) for a 214 cm focal length 16.5 cm aperture reflector with eyepieces allowing up to 1,200 magnification, and 26 Thaler for a screw-micrometer. With this, he systematically observed Venus, Mars, Jupiter and Saturn.

Schröter made extensive drawings of the features of Mars, yet curiously he was always erroneously convinced that what he was seeing was mere cloud formations rather than geographical features. In 1791, he published an important early study on the topography of the Moon entitled Selenotopographische Fragmente zur genauern Kenntniss der Mondfläche. The visual lunar albedo scale developed in this work was later popularised by Thomas Gwyn Elger and now bears his name. In 1793, he was the first to notice the phase anomaly of Venus, now known as the Schröter effect, where the phase appears more concave than geometry predicts.

His two famous assistant astronomers were Karl Ludwig Harding (1796–1805) and Friedrich Wilhelm Bessel (1806–1810).

In 1813, he suffered the disruptions of the Napoleonic Wars: his work was ruined by the French under Vandamme, who destroyed his books, writings and observatory. He never recovered from the catastrophe.

His drawings of Mars were not rediscovered until 1873 (by François J. Terby) and were not published until 1881 (by H. G. van de Sande Bakhuyzen), well after his death.

He was elected a member of the Royal Swedish Academy of Sciences in 1794 and elected a Fellow of the Royal Society in April 1798.

The lunar crater Schröter and the Martian crater Schroeter are named after him, as is Vallis Schröteri (Schröter's Valley) on the Moon.

== See also ==
- List of largest optical telescopes in the 18th century
