= Berliner Astronomisches Jahrbuch =

Almanac cover.

The Berliner Astronomisches Jahrbuch (abbrev. B.A.J.) is an astronomical ephemeris almanac and one of the longest publication series in astronomy. It was a compendium of ephemerides of all large Solar System bodies and of fundamental stars which define the celestial reference system.

The B.A.J. series was founded by Johann Elert Bode, and is thus sometimes referred to as Bode's Astronomisches Jahrbuch. It began publication in 1776 and continued until 1960 when it was merged into the international edition of the Astronomical Ephemeris and Apparent Places of Fundamental Stars (APFS). This merger was decided in 1959 by the IAU.

Starting in 1907 it contained accurate apparent places of the first international fundamental catalogue which was compiled for astrometry; later these data were actualized within the framework of the Catalogues of Fundamental Stars FK3 and FK4.

In the 1940s the Almanac was edited in co-operation with the Astronomisch-Geodätisches Jahrbuch of the Recheninstitut in Heidelberg, Germany, which was also merged into the IAU editions like other national almanacs.
