= Planet X (disambiguation) =

Planet X is a disproved hypothetical planet proposed in 1906 by Percival Lowell to have existed beyond the planet Neptune.

Planet X may also refer to:

== Astronomy ==
- Colloquially, and by extension, any hypothetical trans-Neptunian planet, in particular Planet Nine.

== Science fiction ==
- Planet X, the home planet of Marvel Comics character Groot and other flora colossi
- "Planet X" (comics), a 2004 X-Men comic book story-line
- Planet X (Star Trek), a 1998 novel depicting a crossover between The X-Men and Star Trek
- The name for several fictional planets of the Solar System
- The planet Daffy Duck seeks in the 1953 Merrie Melodies cartoon Duck Dodgers in the 24½th Century
- The home planet of the Xiliens, a fictional alien race featured in the 1965 kaiju film Invasion of Astro-Monster
- A planet in David Ossman's 1973 sci-fi comedy album How Time Flys

== Music ==
- Planet X (Derek Sherinian album), 1999
- Planet X (Helios Creed album), 1994
- Planet-X, an album by bassist Jimmy Johnson
- Planet X (band), a progressive metal band founded by Derek Sherinian
- Plan-It-X Records, a DIY punk rocks record label

== Other uses ==
- Nibiru cataclysm, a supposed impending disastrous encounter between Earth and a large astronomical object
- Operation Planet X, a military operation during the Iraq War in 2003
- Packages from Planet X, a 2013–14 animated television series created by Jeff Harter and aired on Teletoon
- Planet X Limited, a British bicycle company

== See also ==
- List of hypothetical Solar System objects
- Trans-Neptunian object
- Tenth planet (disambiguation)
- Ninth planet (disambiguation)
