= Fifth planet =

Fifth planet may refer to:

== Astronomy ==
- Jupiter, fifth planet from the Sun in the Solar System
- Fifth planet (hypothetical), any of various hypothetical planets thought to have existed
- Planet V, 2002 scientific proposal for a destroyed fifth planet
- Mars, fifth planet from Earth in the Ptolemaic geocentric model
- Ceres (dwarf planet), dwarf planet between Mars and Jupiter in the asteroid belt

== Fiction ==
- Fifth Planet (novel), science fiction novel by Fred and Geoffrey Hoyle

== See also ==
- Planet § History and etymology
