= Ninth planet (disambiguation) =

Ninth planet is a concept related to planets beyond Neptune.

Ninth planet or Planet Nine may also refer to:

== Astronomy ==
- Neptune, sometimes considered the ninth planet from 1979–1999 when Pluto was classified as a planet and was temporarily closer to the Sun than Neptune
- Planet Nine, hypothetical ninth planet in the outer Solar System
- Pluto, considered the ninth planet from its 1930 discovery until it was reclassified as a dwarf planet in 2006 (except 1979–1999, see above)

== Music ==
- Planet 9 (record label), founded by Mya

== See also ==
- Tenth planet (disambiguation)
- Eleventh planet
- Twelfth planet (disambiguation)
- Planet X (disambiguation)
