= Tenth planet (disambiguation) =

Tenth planet is a term formerly applied to possible planets beyond Neptune, before the reclassification of Pluto. It may also refer to:

== Astronomy ==
- 2060 Chiron, claimed by some to be the tenth planet upon discovery
- 15760 Albion, then nicknamed "Smiley" and hailed as the tenth planet
- Eris (dwarf planet), referred to by some to be the tenth planet after discovery, up to the reclassification of Pluto

== Literature ==
- Doctor Who and the Tenth Planet, a 1976 Doctor Who novelization by Gerry Davis
- The Tenth Planet, a. k. a. Days of Creation, a 1944 Captain Future novel by Joseph Samachson under the house name Brett Sterling
- The Tenth Planet, a 1973 novel by Edmund Cooper
- The Tenth Planet, a 1984 novel by Leo Melamed
- The Tenth Planet, a 1999 novel by Dean Wesley Smith and Kristine Kathryn Rusch, the first installment in a trilogy of novels

== Other uses ==
- The 10th Planet, a cancelled space combat game
- 10th Planet Jiu-Jitsu, non-traditional system of Brazilian Jiu-Jitsu
- The Tenth Planet, a 1952 Hollywood Star Playhouse radio play starring Joseph Cotten
- The Tenth Planet, a 1965 Doctor Who serial
- "The Tenth Planet?", a 1972 episode of the BBC astronomy programme The Sky at Night
- "Tenth Planet", a song by Solid Space from the 1982 album Space Museum

== See also ==
- Planet X (disambiguation)
- Ninth planet (disambiguation)
- Eleventh planet
- Fictional planets of the Solar System
