= Pulp era =

Pulp era may refer to:

- The era of the pulp magazines in general, 1896–1950s
- The pulp era of science fiction, commonly held to have begun in 1926
