= Twelfth planet =

Twelfth planet may refer to:

- The 12th Planet, a pseudoscience book by Zecharia Sitchin
- 12th Planet (musician), an American dubstep producer and DJ

== See also ==
- IAU definition of planet
- Planet § History
- Planets beyond Neptune
