= Planet X Limited =

Bicycle company based in Rotherham, England

Planet X Bikes
- Company type: Privately held company
- Industry: Cycling
- Founded: Sheffield, United Kingdom, 1988
- Headquarters: Rotherham, South Yorkshire, United Kingdom
- Key people: Dave Loughran, CEO and founder
- Website: planetx.co.uk

Planet X is a bicycle company based in Rotherham, in the north of England. It was founded in 1988 by Dave Loughran and, in 2020, became an employee-owned trust.

Planet X operates a number of brands including On-One components and Titus bikes.

== Production ==
Planet X works with Taiwanese, Chinese and Italian companies to manufacture its road, cyclocross, track and time-trial frames.

== Retail ==
Planet X operates only online and has no retail stores.

== Sponsorship ==
Planet X sponsored the world XTERRA Triathlon champion, Julie Dibens, during 2008 for a successful defence of her world title.

In 2003, Planet-X sponsored the Trialskings team who used Planet-X Pitbull and Jack Flash frames. These were present in Trialskings team videos, ridden by Danny Holroyd and other members.

== See also ==
- Planet X (disambiguation)
