= Planet V =

Hypothetical fifth plant that existed between Mars and the asteroid belt

Planet V is a hypothetical fifth terrestrial planet posited by NASA scientists John Chambers and Jack J. Lissauer to have once existed between Mars and the asteroid belt. In their hypothesis, the Late Heavy Bombardment of the Hadean eon began after perturbations from the other terrestrial planets caused Planet V's orbit to cross into the asteroid belt. Chambers and Lissauer presented the results of initial tests of this hypothesis during the 33rd Lunar and Planetary Science Conference, held from March 11 through 15, 2002.

== Hypothesis ==
In the Planet V hypothesis, five terrestrial planets were produced during the planetary formation era. The fifth terrestrial planet began on a low-eccentricity orbit between Mars and the asteroid belt with a semi-major axis between 1.8 and 1.9 AU. While long-lived, this orbit was unstable on a time-scale of 600 Myr. Eventually perturbations from the other inner planets drove Planet V onto a high-eccentricity orbit which crossed into the inner asteroid belt. Asteroids were scattered onto Mars-crossing and resonant orbits by close encounters with Planet V. Many of these asteroids then evolved onto Earth-crossing orbits temporarily enhancing the lunar impact rate. This process continued until Planet V was lost most likely by impacting the Sun after entering the ν_{6} secular resonance.

== Tests and results ==
As an initial test of the Planet V hypothesis, Chambers and Lissauer conducted 36 computer simulations of the Solar System with an additional terrestrial planet. A variety of parameters were used to determine the impacts of Planet V's initial orbit and mass. The mean time at which Planet V was lost was found to increase from 100 Myr to 400 Myr as its initial semi-major axis was increased from 1.8 to 1.9 AU. Results consistent with the current Solar System were most common with a 0.25 Mars mass Planet V. In cases with a larger mass Planet V collisions between planets were likely. Overall a third of these simulations were deemed successful in that Planet V was removed without impacting another planet. To test whether Planet V could increase the lunar impact rate they added test particles to one of the simulations. After an initial decline the number of particles on Earth-crossing orbits increased after Planet V entered the inner asteroid belt a pattern consistent with the LHB. These results were presented at the 33rd Lunar and Planetary Science Conference.

In a later article published in the journal Icarus in 2007, Chambers reported the results of 96 simulations examining the orbital dynamics of the Solar System with five terrestrial planets. In a quarter of the simulations Planet V was ejected or impacted the Sun without other terrestrial planets suffering collisions. This result was most frequent if Planet V's mass was less than 0.25 of Mars. The other simulations were not considered successful because Planet V either survived for the entire 1 billion year length of the simulations, or collisions occurred between planets.

The terrestrial Planet V hypothesis was examined by Ramon Brasser and Alessandro Morbidelli in 2011. Their work was the first to focus on the magnitude of the bombardment caused by Planet V. Brasser and Morbidelli calculated that to create the Late Heavy Bombardment Planet V would have to remove 95% of the pre-LHB main asteroid belt or 98% of the inner asteroid belt (semi-major axis < 2.5 AU). Depleting the main asteroid belt by 95% with a 0.5 Mars-mass Planet V was found to require it remain in an orbit crossing the entire asteroid belt for 300 million years. This orbital evolution was not observed in any simulations; Planet V typically entered an Earth-crossing orbit resulting in a short dynamic lifetime before entering such an orbit. In a few percent of simulations Planet V remained in the inner belt long enough to produce the LHB. However, producing the LHB from the inner asteroid belt would require the inner asteroid belt to have begun with 4–13 times the mass, and 10–24 time the orbital density, as the rest of the asteroid belt.

Brasser and Morbidelli also examined the hypothesis that Planet V caused the LHB by disrupting putative asteroid belts between the terrestrial planets. The authors noted that the lack of present-day detection of the remnants of these belts places a significant constraint on this hypothesis, requiring that they be 99.99% depleted before Planet V was lost. While this occurred in 66% of the simulations compatible with the current Solar System for a Venus-Earth belt, it did not occur in any for the Earth-Mars belt due to its higher stability. Morbidelli and Brasser concluded from this result that an Earth-Mars belt could not have contained a significant population. Although Planet V could generate a Late Heavy Bombardment by disrupting a massive Venus-Earth belt alone, the authors observed that significant differences in these belts has not been produced in planetary formation models.

== Alternate version ==
An impact of Planet V onto Mars, forming the Borealis Basin has recently been proposed as an explanation for the Late Heavy Bombardment. Debris from this impact would have a different size distribution than the asteroid belt with a smaller fraction of large bodies and would result in a lower number of giant impact basins relative to craters.

== See also ==
- Disrupted planet
- Fifth planet (hypothetical)
- Nice model
- Phaeton (hypothetical planet)
- List of hypothetical Solar System objects
