= Fictional planets of the Solar System =

Schematic diagram of the orbits of the fictional planets Vulcan, Counter-Earth, and Phaëton in relation to the five innermost planets of the Solar System.

Fictional planets of the Solar System have been depicted since the 1700s—often but not always corresponding to hypothetical planets that have at one point or another been seriously proposed by real-world astronomers, though commonly persisting in fiction long after the underlying scientific theories have been refuted. Vulcan was a planet hypothesized to exist inside the orbit of Mercury between 1859 and 1915 to explain anomalies in Mercury's orbit until Einstein's theory of general relativity resolved the matter; it continued to appear in fiction as late as the 1960s. Counter-Earth—a planet diametrically opposite Earth in its orbit around the Sun—was originally proposed by the ancient Greek philosopher Philolaus in the fifth century BCE (albeit in a pre-heliocentric framework), and has appeared in fiction since at least the late 1800s. It is sometimes depicted as very similar to Earth and other times very different, often used as a vehicle for satire, and frequently inhabited by counterparts of the people of Earth.

Following the discovery of the first asteroids in the early 1800s, it was suggested that the asteroid belt might be the remnants of a planet predicted by the Titius–Bode law to exist between Mars and Jupiter that had somehow been destroyed; this hypothetical former fifth planet is known as Phaëton in astronomy and often dubbed "Bodia" (after Johann Elert Bode) in science fiction. Bodia was popular in the pulp era of science fiction, where it was often depicted as similar to Earth and inhabited by humans who might occasionally be the ancestors of humans on Earth, and stories about its destruction became increasingly common following the invention of the atomic bomb in 1945.

Additional planets in the outer reaches of the Solar System, such as a ninth planet beyond Neptune or especially a tenth beyond Pluto (between the 1930 discovery of Pluto and its reclassification from planet to dwarf planet in 2006), appear regularly. Many different names for this hypothetical outermost planet have been used, the most common being "Persephone". Some stories depict so-called rogue planets that do not orbit any star entering the Solar System from without, typically on a collision course with Earth. Less frequently, fictional planets appear in other locations, such as between Venus and Earth or inside a hollow Earth. Similarly, fictional moons appear in some works; fictional additional moons of the Earth largely fell out of favour with the advent of the Space Age.

== Vulcan ==
Anomalies in Mercury's orbit around the Sun led Urbain Le Verrier to propose the existence of an unseen planet with an orbit interior to Mercury's exerting gravitational influence in 1859, similar to how irregularities in Uranus' orbit had led to his mathematical prediction of Neptune and its subsequent discovery in 1846. This hypothesized planet was dubbed "Vulcan", and it subsequently made several appearances in works of fiction. It has typically been depicted as an extremely hot place. In Donald Horner's 1910 novel By Aeroplane to the Sun, Vulcan is spotted by spacefarers en route to the Sun, but not visited. Mercury's orbital anomalies are now understood to be caused by the effects of general relativity, and Vulcan was thus conclusively dismissed as a serious scientific theory in 1915, having by then already largely fallen out of favour as a result of extensive search failing to result in direct observation of the planet to confirm its existence.

Vulcan nevertheless remained popular in pulp science fiction. It was often depicted as small and dense, explaining how it could have gone undetected telescopically despite being massive enough to alter Mercury's orbit. A high density also allowed for surface gravity similar to Earth gravity and a thick atmosphere, as in Ray Cummings's 1943 short story "The Flame Breathers". As a planet close to the Sun, Vulcan was expected to be metal-rich, and it became a recurring motif that it constituted an abundant source of some rare and valuable material. In Leslie F. Stone's 1932 short story "The Hell Planet", Vulcan is investigated to be mined for resources, while in Harl Vincent's 1932 short story "Vulcan's Workshop", it has been turned into a prison colony for the purpose. At the opposite end of the density spectrum, Vulcan has also repeatedly been portrayed as a hollow planet. In Ross Rocklynne's 1936 short story "At the Center of Gravity" characters become stuck at the midpoint of this vast cavity; in Leigh Brackett's 1942 short story "Child of the Sun", the interior is inhabited by an intelligent lifeform; and in Edmond Hamilton's 1946 Captain Future short story "Outlaw World", the inner surface is covered by tropical vegetation. Another property that Vulcan was expected to have due to its proximity to the Sun was tidal locking, whereby the same side always faces the Sun and sees a perpetual daytime while the other side experiences an unending night—seen in works such as John Russell Fearn's 1940 short story "The Flat Folk of Vulcan", Albert dePina and Henry Hasse's 1943 short story "Alcatraz of the Starways", and Rocklynne's 1946 short story "The Bottled Men". Astrophysicist Elizabeth Stanway comments that the regular depiction of Vulcan as tidally locked, as well as the recurring use of libration as a plot element in works like "Vulcan's Workshop" and "The Bottled Men", indicates that the science fiction writers of the time took some interest in the scientific plausibility of their stories. More exotic visions of Vulcan appear in Fearn's 1936 short story "Mathematica", where it is found to be an entirely artificial planet, and Rocklynne's "Beyond the Boiling Zone", where the immense gravity of the Sun distorts spacetime to the point that Vulcan does not exist in the normal three-dimensional space. A Vulcan-equivalent planet called "Aryl" inside the orbit of Mercury appears in Roman Frederick Starzl's 1931 short story "The Terrors of Aryl".

After the 1940s, Vulcan made only rare appearances in fiction, and mostly in works for younger audiences. A late appearance of Vulcan is found in Hugh Walter's 1965 juvenile novel Mission to Mercury, and a variation on the theme appears in Poul Anderson's 1983 short story "Vulcan's Forge", where an asteroid orbits so close to the Sun that it is partially molten. The name "Vulcan" has continued to be used in science fiction to refer to other celestial objects as in the 1966 Doctor Who serial "The Power of the Daleks", and has come to be most associated with the extrasolar planet Vulcan in the Star Trek franchise.

== Counter-Earth ==
Earth and Gor, a fictional Counter-Earth, share an orbit and are always hidden from each other by the Sun. In reality, this orbital arrangement would not be stable.

The most popular hypothetical planet in fiction is Counter-Earth—a planet diametrically opposite Earth in its orbit around the Sun. The underlying concept was originally proposed by the ancient Greek philosopher Philolaus in the fifth century BCE, working in a pre-heliocentric framework where the Earth, Sun, and Counter-Earth (called Antichthon) all revolve around a "Central Fire" and Counter-Earth is perpetually hidden from Earth's view.

The position of Counter-Earth on the other side of the Sun corresponds to the Sun–Earth L_{3} Lagrange point. In reality, the two planets would not remain hidden from each other as the gravitational influence from other planets would perturb their orbits, altering their relative positions. Conversely, a Counter-Earth of significant mass would reveal its existence indirectly by exerting gravitational influence on other celestial bodies.

Counter-Earth is variously depicted as very similar to Earth or very different, and often employed as a vehicle for satire. Its earliest appearance in fiction may be D. L. Stump's 1896 novel From World to World (later expanded into the 1913 novel The Love of Meltha Laone). In Paul Capon's 1950 novel The Other Side of the Sun and its sequels in the Antigeos trilogy, there are two societies on Antigeos—one of which is utopian—separated by extreme tides caused by the planet's moons. The Doctor Who villains Cybermen, first introduced in the 1966 serial "The Tenth Planet", originate from a Counter-Earth known as Mondas. John Norman's Gor series, starting with the 1966 novel Tarnsman of Gor, uses the titular planet as the setting for planetary romance stories.

Counter-Earth being inhabited by counterparts of the people of Earth is a recurring theme. In Edison Marshall's 1916 short story "Who Is Charles Avison?", the two versions of the title character depart from their respective planets by spaceship but inadvertently both return to the same one. In Edgar Wallace's 1929 novel Planetoid 127, both individuals and events are identical between the two worlds, though with a slight and variable time difference in either direction that enables the inhabitants to gain foreknowledge by communicating with the other planet. In Ben Barzman's 1960 novel Out of This World (a.k.a. Twinkle, Twinkle, Little Star; a.k.a. Echo X), Counter-Earth displays an alternate history where World War II never happened. In the 1969 film Doppelgänger (a.k.a. Journey to the Far Side of the Sun), Counter-Earth is the mirror reflection of Earth, but is otherwise identical. The theme also resurfaced decades later in the 2011 film Another Earth.

Variations on the concept have also appeared. Extrasolar examples of planets on opposite sides in the same orbit around their star appear in the 1976 episode "The Last Enemy" of the television show Space: 1999, where one planet has an all-female population and the other an all-male one, and the two planets are at war; and Malcolm MacCloud's 1981 novel A Gift of Mirrorvax. A planet hidden on the other side of the Moon, rather than Sun, appears in Paul Ernst's 1931 short story "The World Behind the Moon" and W. J. Passingham's 1938 short story likewise titled "The World Behind the Moon". The Mars equivalent, Counter-Mars, also appears occasionally.

== Phaëton ==
How might it be if Ceres and Pallas were just a pair of fragments, or portions of a once greater planet which at one time occupied its proper place between Mars and Jupiter, and was in size more analogous to the other planets, and perhaps millions of years ago, had, either through the impact of a comet, or from an internal explosion, burst into pieces?

— Letter from Heinrich Olbers to William Herschel, May 17, 1802

A now-superseded theory to explain the existence of the asteroid belt that was popular in the 1800s was that it consists of the remnants of a planet predicted by the Titius–Bode law to exist between Mars and Jupiter that had somehow been destroyed. The idea was originally proposed by German astronomer Heinrich Olbers, who discovered the asteroids Pallas and Vesta in 1802 and 1807, respectively. In astronomy, this hypothetical former fifth planet is known as Phaëton; in science fiction, it is often called "Bodia" after Johann Elert Bode. An early science fiction work that mentions this explanation for the origin of the asteroids is Robert Cromie's 1895 novel The Crack of Doom, which describes the release of energy stored in atomic nuclei a few thousand years ago as the culprit.

By the pulp era of science fiction, Bodia was a recurring theme. In these stories it is typically similar to Earth and inhabited by humans, often advanced humans and occasionally the ancestors of humans on Earth. Interplanetary warfare with Mars causes the destruction of Bodia—and indirectly, the end of civilization on Mars—in Harl Vincent's 1930 short story "Before the Asteroids". An internal disaster resulting in the explosion of the planetary core is responsible in John Francis Kalland's 1932 short story "The Sages of Eros". In Leslie F. Stone's 1934 short story "The Rape of the Solar System", war with Mars over the colonization of then-uninhabited Earth results both in the partial destruction of Bodia, thus creating the asteroids, and the displacement of the largest fragment to a much wider orbit to create Pluto, while the settlers on Earth eventually become humanity.

Following the invention of the atomic bomb in 1945, stories of this planetary destruction became increasingly common, encouraged by the advent of a plausible-seeming means of disintegration. Robert A. Heinlein's 1948 novel Space Cadet thus states that the fifth planet was destroyed as a result of nuclear war, and in Ray Bradbury's 1948 short story "Asleep in Armageddon" (a.k.a. "Perchance to Dream"), the ghosts of the former warring factions infect the mind of an astronaut stranded on an asteroid. Several works of the 1950s reused the idea to warn of the dangers of nuclear weapons, including Lord Dunsany's 1954 Joseph Jorkens short story "The Gods of Clay" and James Blish's 1957 novel The Frozen Year (a.k.a. Fallen Star). In Jack Williamson's 1942–1951 Seetee series an antimatter explosion is to blame, and in Theodore Cogswell's 1955 short story "Test Area", the destruction results from a nuclear test conducted by the inhabitants of Mars, while in Heinlein's 1951 novel Between Planets the technology that caused the destruction has been lost to time. The planet's destruction by Martians is also mentioned in Heinlein's 1961 novel Stranger in a Strange Land, and implied to have been caused using supernatural powers. The 1977 novel Inherit the Stars, the first in James P. Hogan's Giants series, revisits the theme of the fifth planet—here called "Minerva"—being destroyed by war fought with advanced weapons.

In Raymond Z. Gallun's 1950 short story "A Step Farther Out", valuables from the destroyed civilization are recovered, and in Harry Harrison's 1969 novel Plague Ship, an ancient virus is found in the asteroid remnants. Paul Preuss's 1985 short story "Small Bodies", where fossils are found on an asteroid, is a late example of the destroyed planet theme; it has otherwise largely been relegated to deliberately retro works such as the 1989 tabletop role-playing game Space: 1889. A variation on the theme appears in Clifford D. Simak's 1973 short story "Construction Shack", where the asteroids are leftover material originally intended for the construction of a fifth planet.

== Trans-Neptunian planets ==
Planets beyond the orbit of Neptune, or even Pluto, appear in several works of science fiction. Pluto was held to be the ninth and outermost planet of the Solar System from its 1930 discovery until its reclassification from planet to dwarf planet in 2006; some works from before the discovery of Pluto imagine a ninth planet beyond the orbit of Neptune, and many works from when Pluto was counted as the ninth portray a hypothetical tenth planet even further out. A contributing factor to the popularity of such a tenth planet was that the search that led to the discovery of Pluto had been motivated by unexplained aberrations in the orbit of Uranus, yet Pluto with its diminutive size seemed insufficient to account for these without another, still-undetected planet causing additional perturbations. (Note: The flyby of Neptune by Voyager 2 in 1989 resolved the question by revealing that the previous estimate for the mass of Neptune was slightly too high; using the more accurate mass provided by the data from the probe in the orbital models eliminated the discrepancies and thus the need for any additional celestial bodies to explain the planetary motion.)

The most common name for this hypothetical outermost planet is "Persephone", (Note: Persephone, in Greek mythology, is a goddess who is the companion of the god Hades. Her counterpart in Roman mythology is Proserpina (sometimes spelled "Proserpine"), companion of the god Pluto. Because of this relationship with Pluto, both the Greek and Roman names have been favoured as names for a trans-Plutonian planet in fiction and the real world alike. It was one of the suggested names for the dwarf planet Eris, and had earlier been used for the asteroid 399 Persephone.) as in Jack Williamson's 1937 short story "The Blue Spot" and several works by Arthur C. Clarke such as the 1946 short story "Rescue Party" and the 1973 novel Rendezvous with Rama, though many other names (Note: Including "Cerberus" in Raymond Z. Gallun's 1934 short story "The World Wrecker", "Euthan" in J. Harvey Haggard's 1936 short story "A Little Green Stone", and "Mephisto" in George O. Smith's 1945 novel Nomad.) appear as well. In Jules Verne's 1889 short story "In the Year 2889", (Note: Originally published under the name Jules Verne, though now believed to have been largely or entirely written by his son Michel Verne.) the discovery of a planet beyond Neptune called "Olympus" is mentioned. Two 1931 short stories by Victor Rousseau Emanuel feature such planets: "Outlaws of the Sun", where the planet Circe has low gravity and is inhabited by primitive giants, and "Revolt on Inferno", where the planet Inferno has a hostile environment and is used as a remote penal colony.

In terms of the physical environment, astrophysicist Elizabeth Stanway comments that many stories, especially in the planetary romance genre, portray the fictional planet as largely Earth-like; in particular, a planet so far from the Sun would be expected to be frigid, but this is often disregarded in these stories. In Henry Kuttner's 1942 short story "We Guard the Black Planet!", the titular tenth planet is an ocean world inhabited by winged humanoids identified with the Valkyries of Norse mythology. Sometimes an explanation for the planet's unexpectedly high temperature is presented, as in the episode "The New Planet" of the 1963–1964 television series Space Patrol, where it is attributed to geothermal activity. In other stories, scientific plausibility takes precedence and the planet is presented as cold. In John W. Campbell's 1937 short story "The Tenth World" (part of the Penton and Blake, or The Planeteers, series) the temperature is close to absolute zero and the planet has corresponding features like rivers of liquid hydrogen and rocks of solid nitrogen. A cold tenth planet becomes the destination for those fleeing Earth in Edmund Cooper's 1973 novel The Tenth Planet, a role the planet also plays in Philip K. Dick's 1955 novel Solar Lottery (a.k.a. World of Chance).

Other variations on the theme also appear. Larry Niven's 1975 short story "The Borderland of Sol" describes four additional planets in the outer reaches of the Solar System. A very distant gas giant appears in Niven and Jerry Pournelle's 1977 novel Lucifer's Hammer, where its gravitational influence alters the trajectory of a comet and puts it on a collision course with Earth, and another appears in Peter Watts' 2006 novel Blindsight.

== Elsewhere in the Solar System ==
Science fiction bibliographers E. F. Bleiler and Richard Bleiler, in the 1998 reference work Science-Fiction: The Gernsback Years, list various imaginary constituents of the pre-modern "science-fiction Solar System". Among these are planets between Venus and Earth, planets on the inside of a hollow Earth, and a planet "behind the Earth". Brian Stableford, in the 2006 reference work Science Fact and Science Fiction: An Encyclopedia, writes that fictional planets have appeared both in fiction and speculative nonfiction since the 1700s, and points to Ludvig Holberg's 1741 work Niels Klim's Underground Travels as unusual in placing such a planet inside the hollow Earth rather than a more distant location. The Bleilers' list also includes various fictional moons that have been depicted; astrophysicist Elizabeth Stanway notes that stories about additional moons of the Earth typically provide some explanation for why these moons have not been detected earlier, such as being very small or only having entered orbit around the Earth recently, and that they largely fell out of favour with the advent of the Space Age.

== Rogue planets ==
So-called rogue planets, those that do not orbit the Sun nor any other star, occasionally turn up in the Solar System in works of fiction. Such a planet colliding with Earth, or threatening to do so, is a recurring motif in apocalyptic fiction. Examples include Edwin Balmer and Philip Wylie's 1933 novel When Worlds Collide, which was adapted to film in 1951, and the 2011 film Melancholia. A rogue planet that enters the Solar System without threatening impact with other celestial objects appears in Ross Rocklynne's 1938 short story "The Men and the Mirror". Similarly, some stories depict additional stars entering the Solar System from without, as in Isaac Asimov's 1989 novel Nemesis, where the errant star is orbited by planets of its own. Another variation on the rogue planet motif involves planets in the Solar System leaving their orbit around the Sun and becoming rogue planets drifting through space, as happens to the Earth by chance in Fritz Leiber's 1951 short story "A Pail of Air" and by design in Liu Cixin's 2000 short story "The Wandering Earth" and its 2019 film adaptation; the same fate befalls the Moon in the 1975–1977 television series Space: 1999 and all of the planets in Edmond Hamilton's 1934 short story "Thundering Worlds".

== See also ==
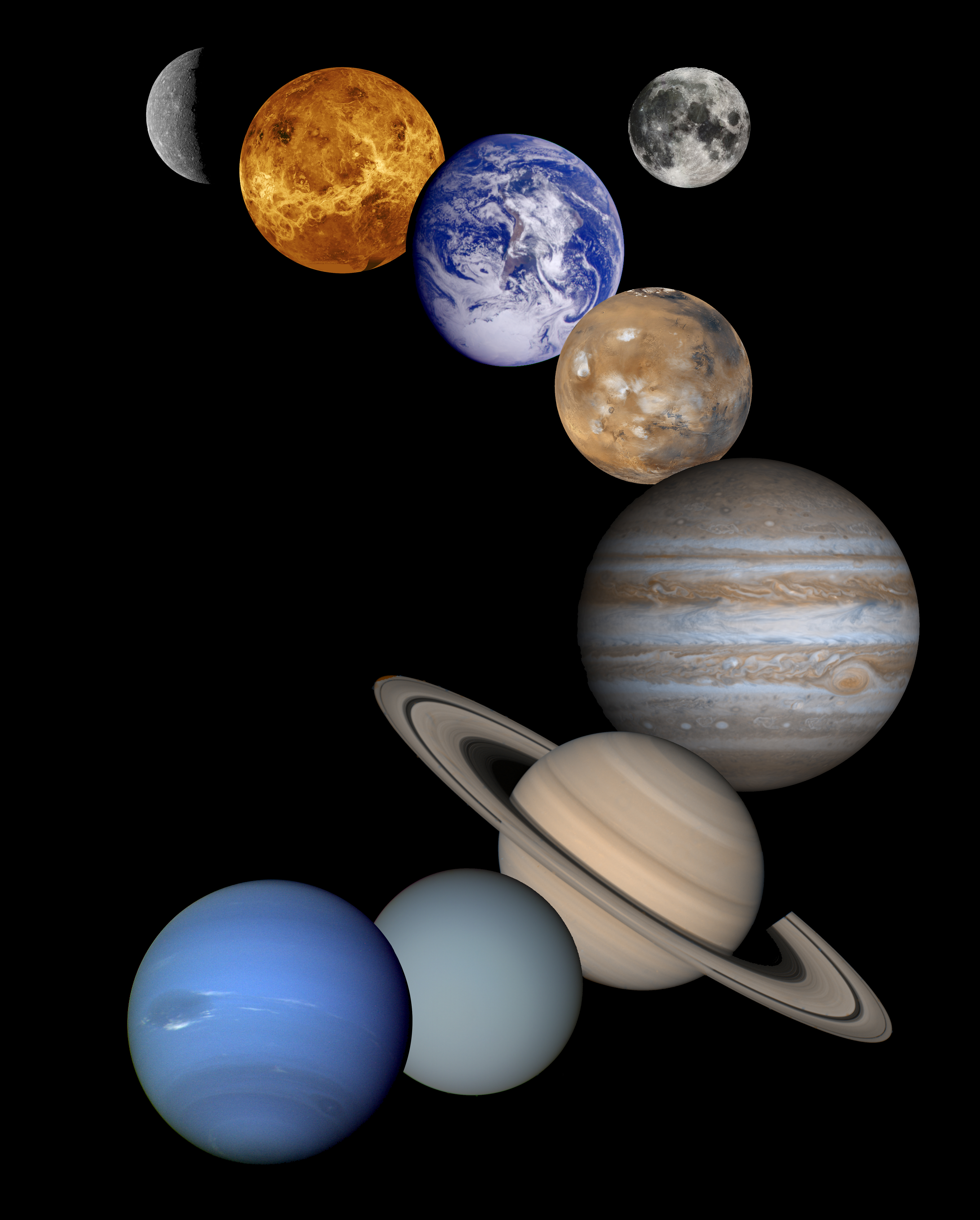
Clicking on a planet leads to the article about its depiction in fiction.

- Extrasolar planets in fiction
- Solar System in fiction
- Sun in fiction
- List of hypothetical Solar System objects
  - Nemesis – Hypothetical star orbiting the Sun, supposedly responsible for extinction events
  - Planet Nine – Hypothetical Solar System planet
  - Theia – Ancient planet that collided with Earth
  - Tyche – Hypothetical gas giant in the Oort cloud
- Planetary objects proposed in religion, astrology, ufology and pseudoscience
