= Destruction of the Moon =

Hypothetical global catastrophe scenario

The destruction of the Moon is a hypothetical global catastrophe scenario explored in fiction and, informally, by scientists.

== Analysis ==
Completely destroying the Moon to avoid the debris reassembling into a satellite would require an amount of energy larger than the Moon gravitational binding energy, estimated to be 1.2 × 10^{29} J. This equals a bit less than 600 billion 50-megaton nuclear bombs, such as the Tsar Bomba, roughly equivalent to the full energy output by the Sun in six minutes. For comparison, the impact that created the South Pole-Aitken basin, the largest lunar impact structure, had an energy of roughly 4 × 10^{26} J, 300 times smaller. Bringing the Moon's orbit within the Roche limit of Earth (within about 18,000 km (11,000 mi)) would also destroy it.

Without the Moon, tides would still happen—the Sun's gravity also causes tides—but they would be substantially reduced, to a quarter of the size of the current spring tide. The sudden disappearance of the Moon, however, could release water pressure and create large potentially catastrophic waves around the oceans. The reduction of tides could have profound negative consequences for coastal ecosystems. Tides also help to drive ocean currents; without the Moon, weather extremes and major weather events would be more common.

In 1993 numerical simulations suggested that the Moon is necessary to keep the Earth's axial tilt stable. Without the Moon the axial tilt of Earth could therefore oscillate chaotically from 0° to 45° on the scale of tens of thousands of years, possibly reaching 85° on timescales of several million years, with severe climatic consequences. More recent studies, however, suggested that, even without the Moon, Earth's axial tilt could be relatively stable on the scale of hundreds of millions of years. Without the Moon, neither solar nor lunar eclipses would exist.

Violent destruction of the Moon would likely bring substantial debris to impact Earth. Such debris would be slower, and thus each debris fragment would have only about 1% of the kinetic energy with respect to an asteroid of the same size; therefore, their impact would be less destructive. However, their sheer quantity could lead nonetheless to substantial atmospheric heating, possibly leading to extinction of life on Earth.

If the Sun destroys the Earth during either of the red giant stages, the Moon will also be destroyed. However, a 2026 study suggests that Earth is likely to survive the asymptotic giant branch phase of the Sun.

== Destruction of other moons ==
Natural satellites can and do get destroyed. The rings of Saturn possibly originated from the destruction of a former moon, called Chrysalis. The capture of Triton by Neptune possibly destroyed some of the previous moons of Neptune, by crashing them on Neptune or Triton itself. In turn, tidal interactions also cause Triton's orbit, which is already closer to Neptune than the Moon is to Earth, to gradually decay further; predictions are that 28 billion years from now, Triton will pass within Neptune's Roche limit and be destroyed. The Mars moon Phobos is expected to meet a similar fate. Phobos gets closer to Mars by about 2 cm per year, and it is predicted that within 30 to 50 million years it will either collide with the planet or break up into a planetary ring. Outside the Solar System, exomoons might collide with planets, removing life from them.

== See also ==
- Moon in science fiction
