= Hypothetical moon of Mercury =

Hypothesized natural satellite orbiting Mercury

Mercury is the closest planet to the Sun and lacks any natural satellites. An undiscovered moon orbiting the planet was hypothesized to exist in the early 1970s, but it turned out to be misinterpreted data from the star 31 Crateris. Observation of a moon of Mercury from Earth would be difficult because Mercury is relatively close to the Sun. For example, Mercury was not observed in the infrared spectrum until 1995. NASA's MESSENGER spacecraft, which orbited Mercury from 2011 to 2015, did not detect any moon. Mercury's small Hill sphere limits the potential for a natural satellite to exist.

== Mariner 10 mission ==
A moon of Mercury was for a short time thought to exist. On March 27, 1974, two days before Mariner 10 made its flyby of Mercury, instruments began registering large amounts of ultraviolet radiation in the vicinity of Mercury that, according to one astronomer, "had no right to be there". By the next day, the radiation had disappeared; it reappeared three days later, appearing to originate from an object that was, seemingly, detached from Mercury. Some astronomers speculated that they had detected a star, but others argued that the object must be a moon, citing not only the two different directions from which the radiation had emanated but also the belief that such high-energy radiation could not penetrate very far through the interstellar medium. Arguments in favor of a moon were strengthened when the object's speed was calculated to be 4 kilometres per second (2.5 mi/s), which matched the expected speed of a moon.

=== 31 Crateris ===
31 Crateris may be an eclipsing binary

A "moon" was detected moving away from Mercury in 1974, and was eventually identified as a background star, 31 Crateris. 31 Crateris is a spectroscopic binary with a period of 2.9 days, and this may have been the source of the ultraviolet radiation detected in 1974. The 'moon of Mercury' misidentification in 1974 sparked an important discovery in astronomy: ultraviolet radiation is not as completely absorbed by the interstellar medium as was formerly thought.

== MESSENGER mission ==
In an April Fools' Day joke in 2012, NASA announced that the MESSENGER spacecraft supposedly discovered a moon in orbit around Mercury, which they named jokingly Caduceus, in reference to the caduceus, the staff carried by the Roman god Mercury. The MESSENGER mission used the spacecraft to search for moons of Mercury in 2011 and 2013, and confirmed that Mercury had none.

== See also ==
- List of hypothetical Solar System objects
- Claimed moons of Earth
