= Fifth planet (hypothetical) =

Other planets thought to be 5th from the Sun

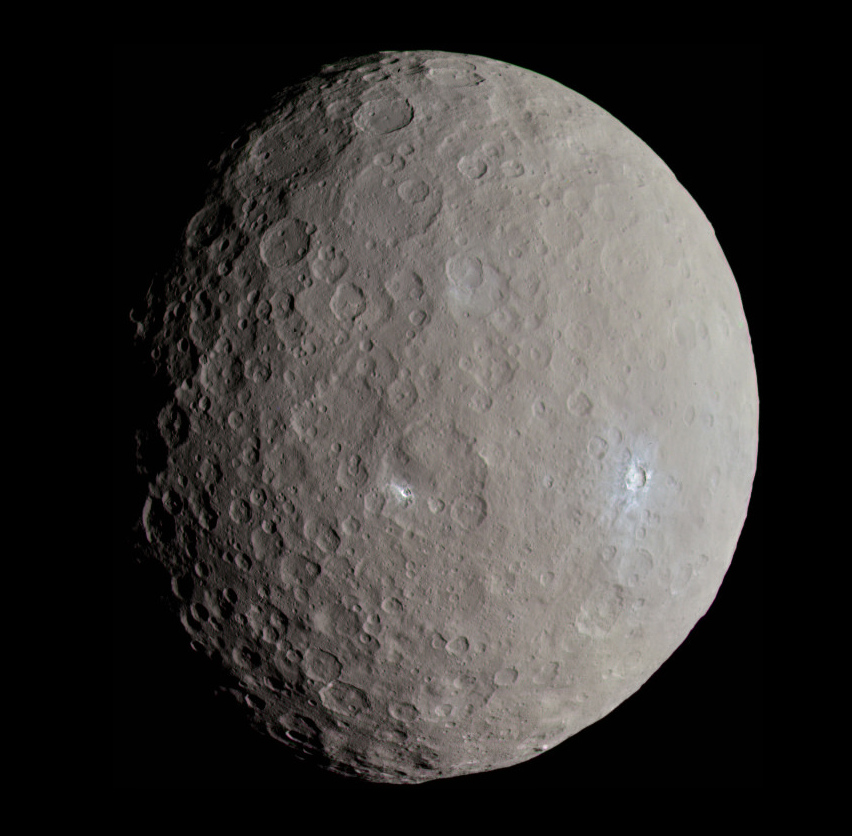
Ceres, the only dwarf planet in the asteroid belt, was once categorized as a planet.

In the history of astronomy, a handful of Solar System bodies other than Jupiter have been counted as the fifth planet from the Sun. Various hypotheses have also postulated the former existence of a fifth planet, now destroyed, to explain various characteristics of the inner Solar System.

== Hypotheses ==
There are three main ideas regarding hypothetical planets between Mars and Jupiter.

=== Asteroids ===
During the early 19th century, as asteroids were discovered, they were considered to be planets. Jupiter became the sixth planet with the discovery of Ceres in 1801. Soon, three more asteroids, Pallas (1802), Juno (1804), and Vesta (1807) were discovered. They were counted as separate planets, even though they share a single orbital spacing given by the Titius–Bode law. Between 1845 and 1851, eleven additional asteroids were discovered, and Jupiter had become the twentieth planet. At this point, astronomers began to classify asteroids as minor planets. Following the reclassification of the asteroids in their own group, Jupiter became the fifth planet once again. Following the International Astronomical Union's (IAU) redefinition of the term planet in August 2006, Ceres is now considered a dwarf planet.

=== Disruption hypothesis ===
The disruption hypothesis suggests that a planet which was positioned between Mars and Jupiter was destroyed, creating the asteroid belt between these planets. First proposed by astronomer Heinrich Wilhelm Matthias Olbers, scientists in the 20th century dubbed this hypothetical planet "Phaeton". Astronomers proposed various properties of Phaeton, including masses ranging from 1–8 M_{☾} and an icy composition. However, the hypothesis faced criticisms due to difficulties in adequately explaining the mechanisms behind planetary breakup. The Phaeton hypothesis was eventually superseded by the accretion model, as the observed properties of the asteroid belt did not fit an origin from a single, disrupted planet.

=== Planet V hypothesis ===
Based on simulations, NASA space scientists John Chambers and Jack J. Lissauer have proposed the existence of a planet between Mars and the asteroid belt, going in a successively eccentric and unstable orbit, 4 billion years ago. They connect this planet, which they name Planet V, and its disappearance with the Late Heavy Bombardment episode of the Hadean era. Chambers and Lissauer also claim this Planet V most probably ended up crashing into the Sun. Unlike the disruption hypothesis's fifth planet, "Planet V" is not credited with creating the asteroid belt.

== Fifth planet in fiction ==
A hypothetical former fifth planet that has since been destroyed has been referenced in fiction since at least the late 1800s. In science fiction, the planet is often called "Bodia" after Johann Elert Bode. By the pulp era of science fiction, Bodia was a recurring theme. In these stories it is typically similar to Earth and inhabited by humans, often advanced humans and occasionally the ancestors of humans on Earth. Following the invention of the atomic bomb in 1945, stories of this planetary destruction became increasingly common, encouraged by the advent of a plausible-seeming means of disintegration. Several works of the 1950s used the idea to warn of the dangers of nuclear weapons. The concept has since largely been relegated to deliberately retro works.

== See also ==
- Disrupted planet
- Fictional planets of the Solar System
- Hypothetical planetary object
- Planet § History
- Planets beyond Neptune
- Trans-Neptunian object
