= Chrysalis (hypothetical moon) =

Hypothetical moon of Saturn

Chrysalis was a hypothetical former moon of Saturn, named in 2022 by scientists of the Massachusetts Institute of Technology using data from the Cassini–Huygens mission. The moon is hypothesized to have been torn apart by Saturn's tidal forces, somewhere between 200 and 100 million years ago. Up to 99% of the moon's mass would have been swallowed by Saturn, with the remaining 1% forming the rings of Saturn. The origin of Saturn's rings from the destruction of a satellite has been previously proposed by other authors.

== Nomenclature ==
The hypothetical moon was named after the pupa stage of a butterfly, with the rings of Saturn representing its emergence from the chrysalis.

== Size and orbit ==
Chrysalis was hypothesized to be similar in size and mass to Iapetus, with a similar water-ice composition, and to have orbited somewhere between Iapetus and Titan. Its orbit around Saturn may have been degraded as a result of Titan's orbit expanding due to interactions of the Saturnian system with a resonance with Neptune, resulting in the increasing eccentricity of Chrysalis's orbit until being torn apart during a close encounter with Saturn by its parent planet's gravitational force.

== See also ==
- List of hypothetical Solar System objects
- Rings of Saturn § Formation and evolution of main rings
- Phaeton
