= Theia (hypothetical planet) =

Ancient planet that collided with Earth

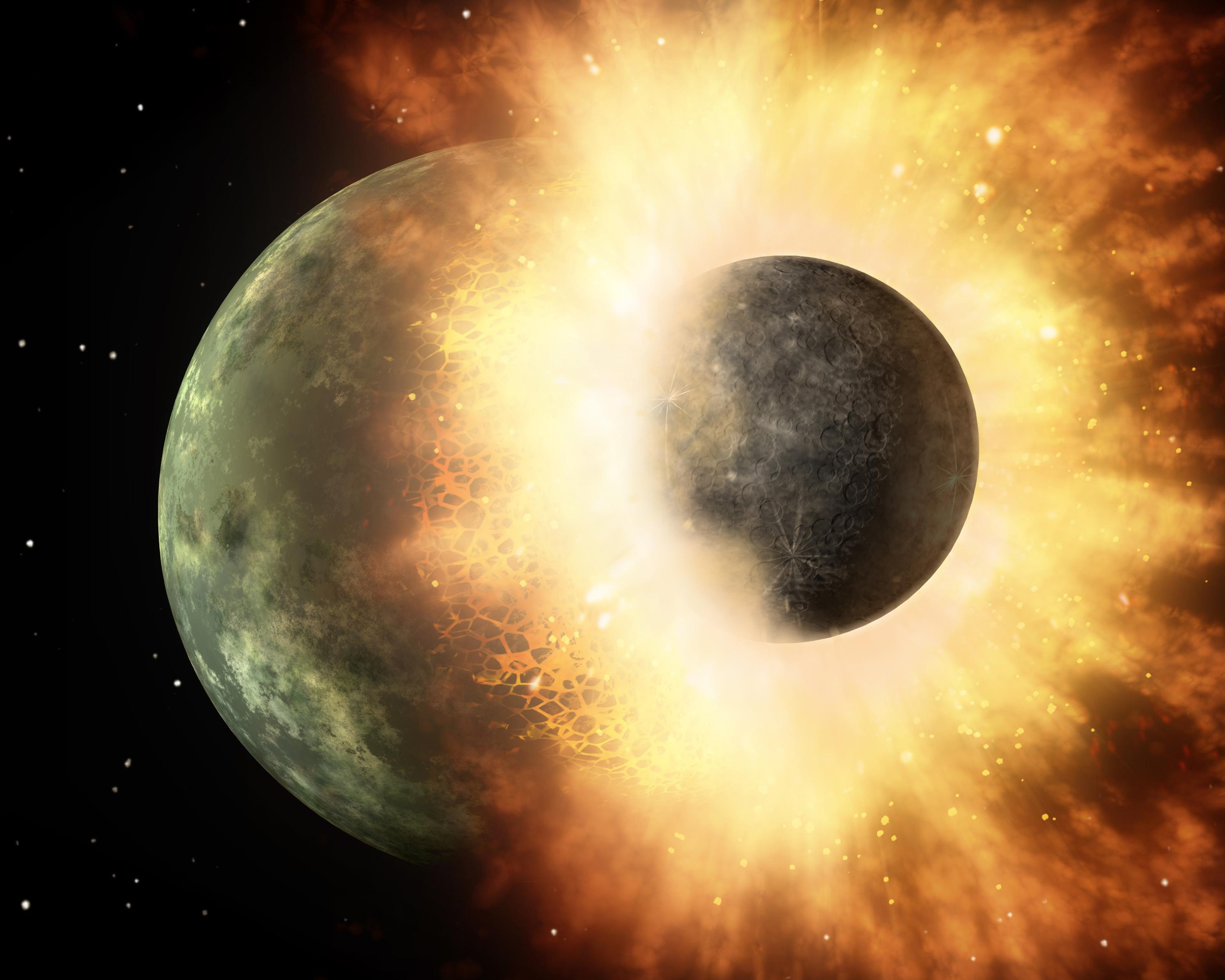
- Artist's depiction of a collision between two planetary bodies, similar to the hypothesized collision between Theia and the proto-Earth.

Designations
- Pronunciation: /ˈθiːə/
- Named after: Theia

Orbital characteristics
- Semi-major axis: 1.16 – 1.195 AU
- Star: Sun

Physical characteristics
- Mass: 0.1 - 0.45 M_{🜨} 0.13 – 0.15 M_{🜨} (pre-impact)

Theia (/ˈθiːə/ THEE-uh) is a hypothetical planet in the early Solar System which, according to the giant-impact hypothesis, collided with the proto-Earth around 4.50 billion years ago, with some of the resulting ejected debris re-coalescing to form the Moon. Collision simulations support the idea that the two large low-shear-velocity provinces in the Earth's lower mantle may be remnants of Theia.

Theia is hypothesized to have been about the size of Mars and likely formed at the L_{4} or L_{5} Lagrange points of the Earth's orbit, although some hypotheses debatably suggested it may have formed in the outer Solar System and later migrated into the Earth's orbit, and might have provided much of Earth's water.

== Name ==
In Greek mythology, Theia was one of the Titans, the sister of Hyperion whom she later married, and the mother of Selene, the goddess of the Moon. This story parallels the planet Theia's theorized role in creating the Moon.

== Orbit ==
In one hypothesis, Theia formed at the L_{4} Lagrange point, then went into a chaotic orbit, approached the Earth, and collided with it. One "loop" of the orbit takes one year. The Earth is shown stationary (rotating frame of reference).

Theia is hypothesized to have orbited in the L_{4} or L_{5} configuration presented by the Earth–Sun system, where it would tend to remain. If this were the case it might have grown to a size comparable to Mars. Gravitational perturbations by Venus could have put it onto a collision course with the early Earth. A 2017 study found that the most probable orbital origin for Theia was a relatively stable orbit outside of Earth's, with a semi-major axis between 1.16 AU and 1.195 AU.

Later studies have investigated Inner Solar System orbits. This hypothesis is supported by isotope analysis of both lunar and terrestrial rocks.

== Physical characteristics ==
=== Size and mass ===
Theia is often suggested to be around the size of Mars, with a mass about 10% that of modern-day Earth. However, its size is not certain, with some authors suggesting that it may have been larger, perhaps 30% or even 40–45% the mass of Earth, making it nearly equal to the mass of the proto-Earth. A newer study suggests that pre-impact Theia has a mass of approximately 13% to 15% the mass of Earth.

=== Composition ===
The composition of Theia and how different it was from Earth is disputed and subject to debate. It is considered unlikely that Theia had an exactly similar isotopic composition to the proto-Earth. A key constraint has been that the many isotope ratios of retrieved rocks from the Moon are nearly identical to those from Earth, implying either that the two bodies were extensively homogenized by the collision, or that the isotopic composition of Theia was very similar to Earth. However, a 2020 study showed that lunar rocks were more variable in oxygen isotope composition than previously thought, some differing more from Earth than others, with the more divergent values probably originating deeper in the lunar mantle suggested to be a more true reflection of Theia, and may suggest that Theia formed further away from the Sun than Earth.

== Collision ==
A supercomputer simulation on how the Moon formed, made by NASA's Ames Research Center

According to the giant impact hypothesis, Theia orbited the Sun, nearly along the orbit of the proto-Earth, by staying close to one or the other of the Earth–Sun system's two more stable Lagrangian points (i.e. either L_{4} or L_{5}). Theia was eventually perturbed away from that relationship, most likely by the gravitational influence of Jupiter, Venus, or both, resulting in a collision between Theia and Earth.

Initially, the hypothesis supposed that Theia had struck Earth with a glancing blow and ejected many pieces of both the proto-Earth and Theia, those pieces either forming one body that became the Moon or forming two moons that eventually merged to form the Moon. Such accounts assumed that a head-on impact would have destroyed both planets, creating a short-lived second asteroid belt between the orbits of Venus and Mars.

In contrast, evidence published in January 2016 suggests that the impact was indeed a head-on collision and that Theia's remains are on Earth and the Moon.

Simulations suggest that Theia would be responsible for around 70–90% of the total mass of the Moon under a classic giant impact scenario where Theia is considerably smaller than proto-Earth.

== Hypotheses ==
From the beginning of modern astronomy, there have been at least four hypotheses for the origin of the Moon:

1. A single body split into Earth and Moon
2. The Moon was captured by Earth's gravity (as most of the outer planets' smaller moons were captured)
3. The Earth and Moon formed at the same time when the protoplanetary disk accreted
4. The Theia-impact scenario described above

The lunar rock samples retrieved by Apollo astronauts were found to be very similar in composition to Earth's crust, and so were likely removed from Earth in some violent event.

It is possible that the large low-shear-velocity provinces detected deep in Earth's mantle may be fragments of Theia. In 2023, computer simulations reinforced that hypothesis.

== See also ==
- Disrupted planet
- Phaeton (hypothetical planet)
- Synestia
