= Phaeton (hypothetical planet) =

Hypothetical former Solar System planet

Phaeton (alternatively Phaethon /ˈfeɪ.əθən/ or Phaëton /ˈfeɪ.ətən/; from Ancient Greek: Φαέθων, romanized: Phaéthōn, pronounced [pʰa.é.tʰɔːn]) is a hypothetical planet hypothesized by the Titius–Bode law to have existed between the orbits of Mars and Jupiter, the destruction of which supposedly led to the formation of the asteroid belt (including the dwarf planet Ceres). The hypothetical planet was named for Phaethon, the son of the sun god Helios in Greek mythology, who attempted to drive his father's solar chariot for a day with disastrous results and was ultimately destroyed by Zeus.

== Phaeton hypothesis ==
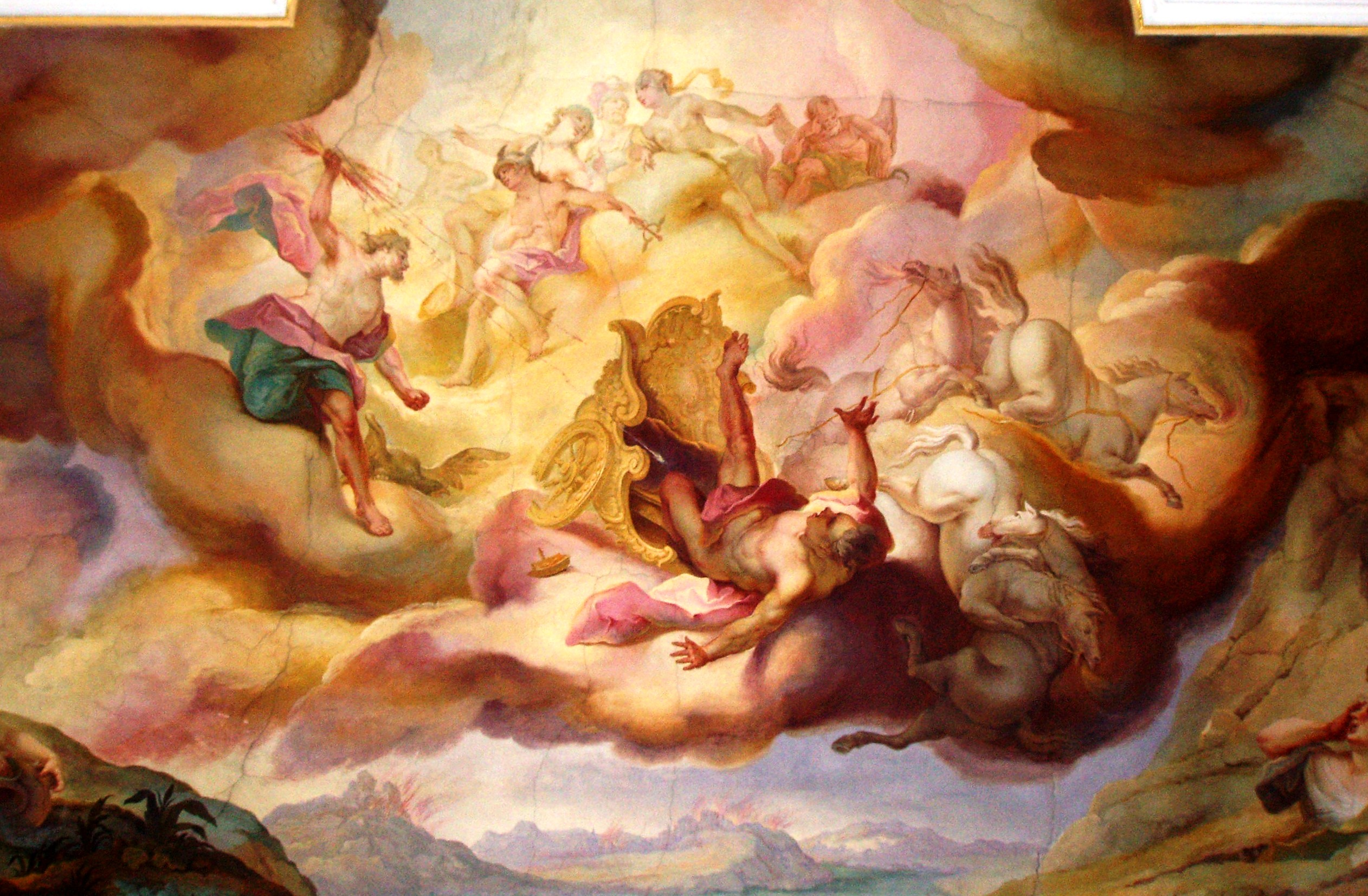
Sturz des Phaeton (Fall of the Phaeton) by Johann Michael Franz

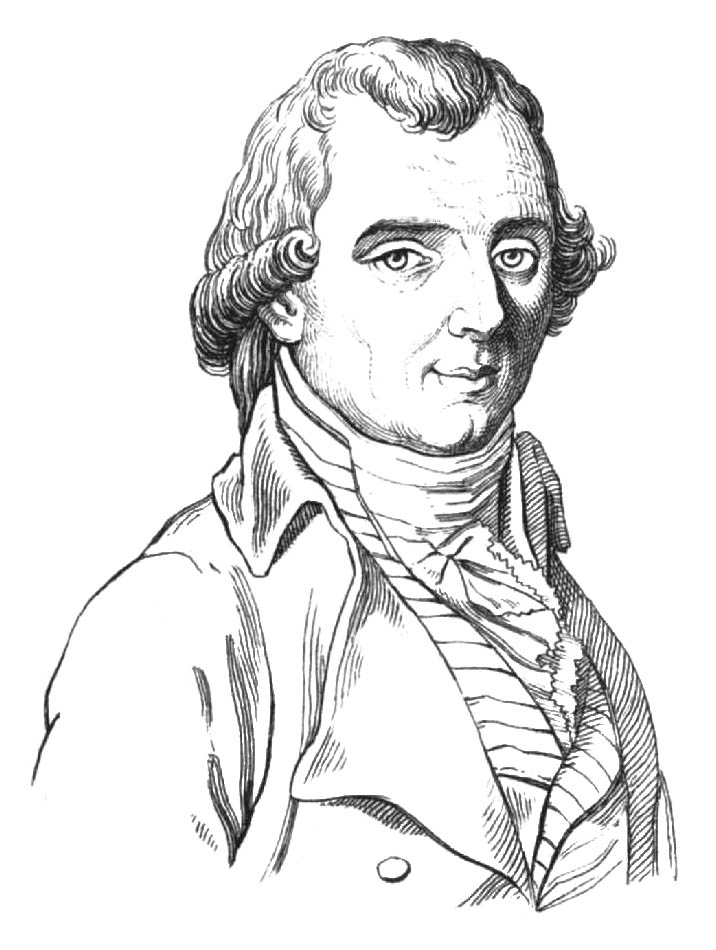
Heinrich Wilhelm Matthäus Olbers, who formulated the planet Phaeton hypothesis

According to the hypothesized Titius–Bode law proposed in the 1700s to explain the spacing of planets in a solar system, a planet may have once existed between Mars and Jupiter. After learning of the regular sequence discovered by the German astronomer and mathematician Johann Daniel Titius, astronomer Johann E. Bode urged a search for the fifth planet corresponding to a gap in the sequence. (1) Ceres, the largest asteroid in the asteroid belt (now considered a dwarf planet), was serendipitously discovered in 1801 by the Italian Giuseppe Piazzi and found to closely match the "empty" position in Titius' sequence, which led many to believe it to be the "missing planet". However, in 1802 astronomer Heinrich Wilhelm Matthäus Olbers discovered and named the asteroid (2) Pallas, a second object in roughly the same orbit as (1) Ceres.

Olbers proposed that these two discoveries were the fragments of a disrupted planet that had formerly orbited the Sun, and predicted that more of these pieces would be found. The discovery of the asteroid (3) Juno by Karl Ludwig Harding and (4) Vesta by Olbers, buttressed his hypothesis. In 1823, German linguist and retired teacher Johann Gottlieb Radlof called Olbers' destroyed planet Phaëthon, linking it to the Greek myths and legends about Phaethon and others.

In 1927, Franz Xaver Kugler wrote a short book titled Sibyllinischer Sternkampf und Phaëthon in naturgeschichtlicher Beleuchtung (The Sybilline Battle of the Stars and Phaeton Seen as Natural History). The central idea in Kugler's book is that the myth of Phaethon was based on a real event: Making use of ancient sources, Kugler argued that Phaeton had been a very bright celestial object that appeared around 1500 BC which fell to Earth not long afterwards as a shower of large meteorites, causing catastrophic fires and floods in Africa and elsewhere.

Hypotheses regarding the formation of the asteroid belt from the destruction of a hypothetical fifth planet are today collectively referred to as "the disruption theory". These hypotheses state that there was once a major planetary member of the Solar System circulating in the present gap between Mars and Jupiter, which was destroyed by one or more of the following hypothetical processes:

- it veered too close to Jupiter and was torn apart by its powerful tides
- it was struck by another large celestial body
- it was destroyed by a hypothetical brown dwarf, the companion star to the Sun, known as Nemesis
- it was shattered by some internal catastrophe

In 1953, Soviet Russian astronomer Ivan I. Putilin suggested that Phaeton was destroyed due to centrifugal forces, giving it a diameter of approximately 6,880 kilometres (4,280 mi) (slightly larger than Mars' diameter of 6,779 kilometres [4,212 mi]) and a rotational speed of 2.6 hours. Eventually, the planet became so distorted that parts of it near its equator were spun off into space. Outgassing of gases once stored in Phaeton's interior caused multiple explosions, sending material into space and forming asteroid families. However, his hypothesis was not widely accepted. Two years later in 1955, Odesan astronomer Konstantin N. Savchenko suggested that Ceres, Pallas, Juno, and Vesta were not fragments of Phaeton, but rather its former moons. Phaeton had an additional fifth satellite, assumed to be the size of Ceres, orbiting near the planet's Hill sphere, and thus more subject to gravitational perturbations from Jupiter. As a result, the fifth satellite became tidally detached and orbited the Sun for millions of years afterward, making periodic close misses with Phaeton that slowly increased its velocity. Once the escaped satellite re-entered Phaeton's Hill sphere, it collided with the planet at high speed, shattering it while Ceres, Pallas, Juno, and Vesta assumed heliocentric orbits. Simulations showed that for such a Ceres-sized body to shatter Phaeton, it would need to be travelling at nearly 20 kilometres per second (12 mi/s).

The disrupted planet hypothesis was also supported by French–Italian mathematician and astronomer Joseph-Louis Lagrange in 1814; Canadian geologist Reginald Daly in 1943; American geochemists Harrison Brown and Clair Patterson in 1948; Soviet academics Alexander Zavaritskiy in 1948, Vasily Fesenkov in 1950 (who later rejected his own model) and Otto Schmidt (died 1956); British–Canadian astronomer Michael Ovenden in 1972–1973; and American astronomer Donald Menzel (1901–1976) in 1978. Ovenden suggested that the planet be named "Krypton" after the destroyed native world of Superman, as well as believing it to have been a gas giant roughly eighty-five to ninety Earth masses in mass and nearly the size of Saturn.

Today, the Phaeton hypothesis has been superseded by the accretion model. Most astronomers today believe that the asteroids in the main belt are remnants of the protoplanetary disk that never formed a planet and that in this region the amalgamation of protoplanets into a planet was prevented by the disruptive gravitational perturbations of Jupiter during the formative period of the Solar System.

== Other hypotheses ==
Some scientists and non-scientists continue to advocate for the existence and destruction of a Phaeton-like planet.

Zecharia Sitchin suggested that the goddess known to the Sumerians as Tiamat in fact relates to a planet that was destroyed by a rogue planet known as Nibiru, creating both Earth and the asteroid belt. His work is widely regarded as pseudoscience.

The astronomer and author Tom Van Flandern held that Phaeton (which he called "Planet V", with V representing the Roman numeral for five and not to be confused with the other postulated former fifth planet not attributed to the formation of the asteroid belt) exploded through some internal mechanism. In his "Exploded Planet Hypothesis 2000", he lists possible reasons for its explosion: a runaway nuclear reaction of uranium in its core, a change of state as the planet cooled down creating a density phase change, or through continual absorption of heat in the core from gravitons. Van Flandern even suggested that Mars itself may have been a moon of Planet V, due to its craters hinting to exposure to meteorite storms and its relatively low density compared to the other inner planets.

In 1972, Soyuzmultfilm studios produced an animated short film titled Phaeton: The Son of Sun (Russian: Фаэтон – Сын Солнца), directed by Vasiliy Livanov, in which the asteroid belt is portrayed as the remains of a planet. The film also has numerous references to ancient astronauts.

== In fiction ==
The hypothetical former fifth planet has been referenced in fiction since at least the late 1800s. In science fiction, the planet is often called "Bodia" after Johann Elert Bode. By the pulp era of science fiction, Bodia was a recurring theme. In these stories it is typically similar to Earth and inhabited by humans, often advanced humans and occasionally the ancestors of humans on Earth. Following the invention of the atomic bomb in 1945, stories of this planetary destruction became increasingly common, encouraged by the advent of a plausible-seeming means of disintegration. Several works of the 1950s used the idea to warn of the dangers of nuclear weapons. The concept has since largely been relegated to deliberately retro works.

== See also ==
- Asteroid belt
- Disrupted planet
- Fifth planet
- Giant-impact hypothesis
- History of Solar System formation and evolution hypotheses
- List of hypothetical Solar System objects
- Nibiru
- Planet V
- Theia (planet)
- Zecharia Sitchin

== Sources ==
- "Olbers, Heinrich Wilhelm Matthias" . Encyclopædia Britannica. Vol. 20 (11th ed.). 1911. p. 63.
- Christy-Vitale, Joseph (2004). Watermark: The Disaster That Changed the World and Humanity 12,000 Years Ago. New York: Simon and Schuster.
- Cole, Dandridge M.; Cox, Donald William (1964). Islands in Space: The Challenge of the Planetoids. Philadelphia: Chilton Books.
- McSween, Harry Y. (2004). Meteorites and Their Parent Planets. Cambridge: Cambridge University Press.
- Annals of the New York Academy of Sciences. New York Academy of Sciences. 1877., Records of meetings 1808–1916 in v. 11–27, p. 872.
