= Michael Ovenden =

British astronomer (1926–1987)

Michael William Ovenden
- Born: 21 May 1926; Muswell Hill, London, England
- Died: March 15, 1987 (aged 60); Vancouver, Canada
- Education: Queen Mary College, London; Cambridge University
- Occupation: astronomer
- Years active: 1953–1985
- Known for: President of the Astronomical Society of Glasgow; Professor of Astronomy at University of British Columbia
- Notable work: see Publications

Michael William Ovenden FRSE FRAS (21 May 1926 – 15 March 1987) was a 20th-century British astronomer who was President of the Astronomical Society of Glasgow and Professor of Astronomy at University of British Columbia.

== Life ==
He was born on 21 May 1926 in the Muswell Hill district of north London. His first degree was from Queen Mary College, London in 1947. He then went to Cambridge University where he received an MA.

In 1953 he began lecturing in Astronomy at Glasgow University being promoted to Senior Lecturer in 1964.

In 1964 he was elected a Fellow of the Royal Society of Edinburgh. His proposers were Peter Alan Sweet, Hermann Bruck, Hugh Butler, and Peter Fellgett.

In 1966 he emigrated to Canada to take the role as Professor of Astronomy at the University of British Columbia.

He retired in 1985 due to ill-health and died of a heart attack on 15 March 1987 in Vancouver in Canada.

== Publications ==
- Recent Advances in Science (1952)
- The Deflection of Light by the Solar Gravitational Field (1952)
- Looking at the Stars (1957)
- Artificial Satellites (1960)
- Life in the Universe (1962)
- On the Satellite Capture Problem (1975) with John Byl

== See also ==
- Phaeton (hypothetical planet)
