= 31 Crateris =

Star in the constellation Corvus

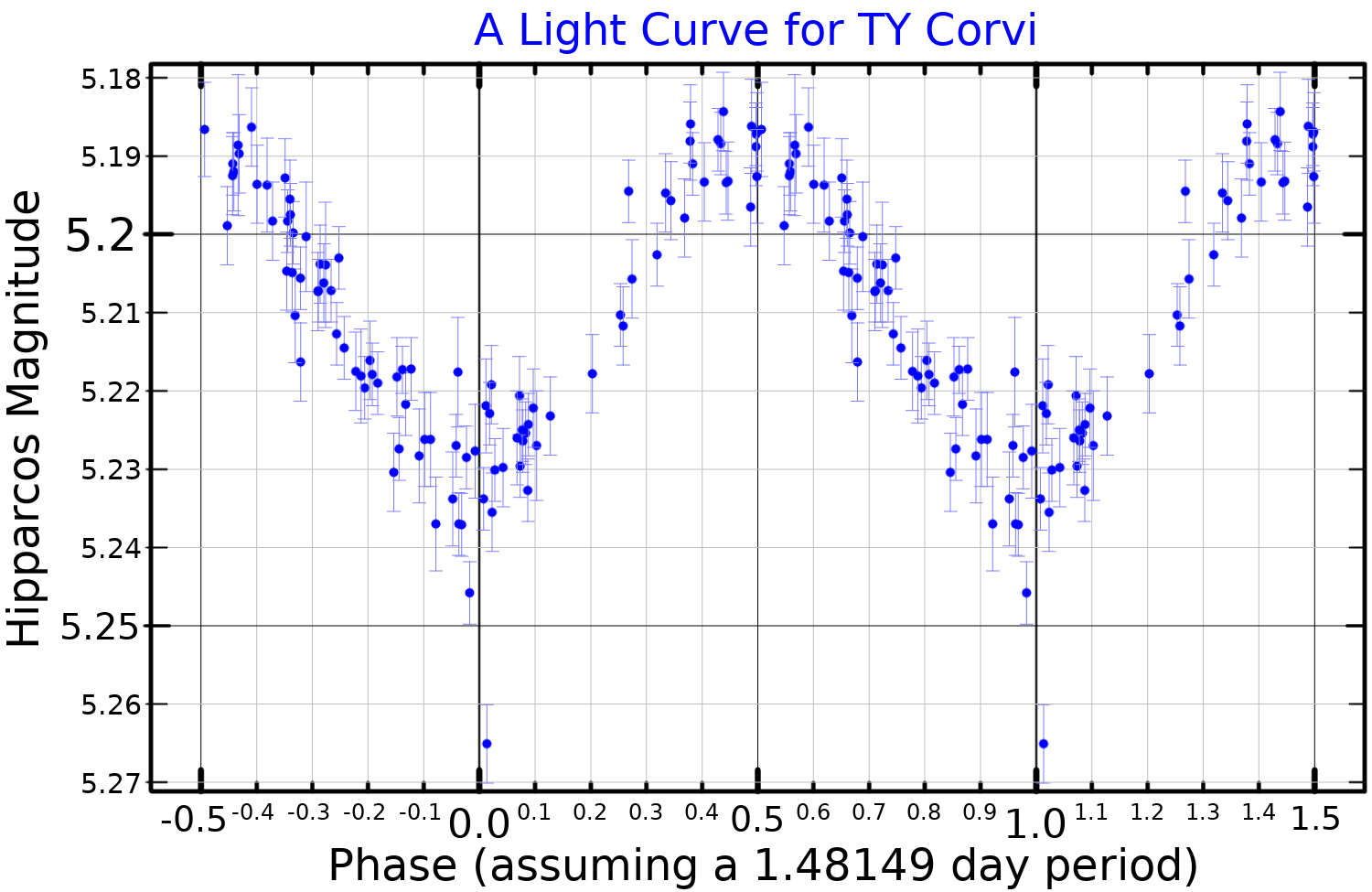
- A light curve for TY Corvi, plotted from Hipparcos data

Observation data Epoch J2000.0 Equinox J2000.0
- Constellation: Corvus
- Right ascension: 12^{h} 00^{m} 51.15916^{s}
- Declination: −19° 39′ 32.3322″
- Apparent magnitude (V): 5.19-5.23

Characteristics
- Spectral type: B1.5V + ?
- Variable type: Eclipsing binary

Astrometry
Radial velocity (R_{v})	1.7±2 km/s
Proper motion (μ)	RA: −17.071 mas/yr Dec.: +6.830 mas/yr
Parallax (π)	1.6891±0.1525 mas
Distance	1,900 ± 200 ly (590 ± 50 pc)
Absolute magnitude (M_{V})	−2.71

Details
Mass	11.0 M_{☉}
Luminosity	13,900 L_{☉}
Temperature	23,442 K

Other designations
- 31 Crateris, TY Corvi, HD 104337, HR 4590, HIP 58587, SAO 157042, BD−18°3295

Database references
SIMBAD	data

31 Crateris is a binary star system in the constellation Corvus. Varying between apparent magnitudes 5.19 and 5.23 over 1.48 days, it has the variable star designation of TY Corvi. It is actually a remote system with a hot blue-white star of spectral type B1.5V and a companion about which little is known. The two stars orbit each other every 2.9631 days. The primary is possibly a blue straggler of the Hyades group. The primary is around 11 times as massive as the Sun and 13,900 times as luminous.

Johann Elert Bode designated this star Mu Crateris in his 1801 Uranographia, but this is now no longer used.

British astronomer John Flamsteed numbered the stars in an expanded constellation he termed Hydra and Crater, which included the stars of Hydra immediately below the Cup. Published in 1712, this was not followed by later astronomers. 31 Crateris ended up in the constellation Corvus after formal boundaries were set in 1922.

On 27 March 1974, the Mariner 10 mission detected emissions in the far ultraviolet. These were initially thought to be from an undiscovered satellite of Mercury before the source was shown to be 31 Crateris.
