= Pulp era of science fiction =

Historiographic concept and term

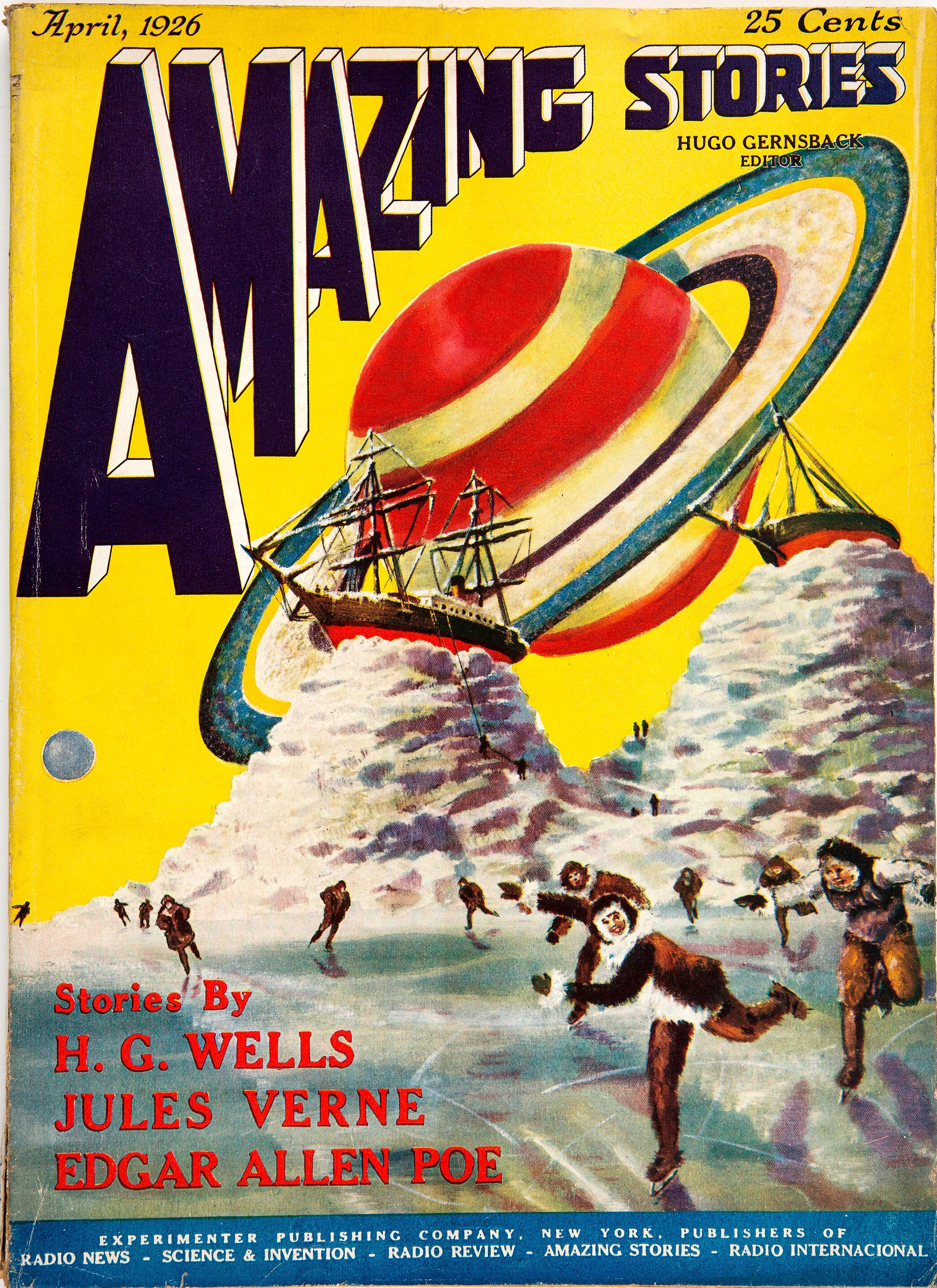
First issue of Amazing Stories, April 1926. Its publication is often regarded as the beginning of the pulp era of science fiction.

In the history of science fiction, the pulp era (occasionally pulp age) is a period subject to various definitions. It is commonly held to have begun in 1926, the year the first science fiction magazine—Hugo Gernsback's Amazing Stories—was launched. The end point is usually placed in the 1950s, when the pulp magazines ceased publication. Various largely similar definitions exist that differ by a few years in either direction at the beginning or end of the period, though there are some outliers—by the broadest definition the era began in 1896 with the first (albeit genre-nonspecific) pulp magazine Argosy, and by the narrowest it ended in 1937 with the onset of the Golden Age of Science Fiction. The notion of science fiction as a defined genre, as well as the term science fiction itself, originated in this period.

== Background ==
The first pulp magazine appeared in 1896 when Frank Munsey changed the format of Argosy and started printing it on pulp paper. Argosy and the magazines that followed in its wake carried general fiction, including science fiction; the first science fiction story published in a pulp magazine was Charles H. Palmer's "Citizen 504", which appeared in the very first pulp issue of Argosy (December 1896). Pulp magazines specializing in specific genres, such as Westerns or crime fiction, started appearing in the 1910s with titles like Detective Story Magazine (launched 1915) and Western Story Magazine (launched 1919). The first pulp magazine devoted to speculative fiction—including but not limited to science fiction—was Weird Tales, (Note: The Thrill Book, which saw a total of sixteen issues in 1919, is sometimes described as the first. It was initially a dime novel, switching to the pulp format halfway through its run. It specialized in adventure fiction "with an unusual twist" and sought to publish stories that other magazines would reject "because of their odd qualities and harrowing nature". It printed a substantial amount of science fiction and otherwise supernatural fiction and fantasy, but was not limited to these genres.) launched in 1923.

The first dedicated science fiction magazine was Amazing Stories, launched by Hugo Gernsback in 1926, though it was not originally a pulp magazine and would not be until 1933; the first science fiction magazine that was also a pulp magazine was Astounding Stories of Super-Science when it launched in 1930. With the science fiction magazines came the notion of science fiction as a defined genre. This was also the origin of the term "science fiction" to refer to that genre; Gernsback adopted the term in 1929, having called the genre "scientifiction" at the 1926 launch of Amazing. Earlier works in the genre had received other labels; for instance, Jules Verne's had been referred to as voyages extraordinaires and H. G. Wells's as scientific romances.

Several additional magazines by Gernsback and others appeared, and in some cases disappeared again, in the years that followed; in 1937, there were seven science fiction pulp magazines in publication. The majority of science fiction that was published in pulp magazines nevertheless continued to appear in general pulps rather than science fiction ones until 1943. Magazines remained the primary outlet for science fiction until the end of World War II, after which anthologies and novels became increasingly common alongside other forms of media such as film, television, and comics.

After 1950, the pulps gradually disappeared, largely to be replaced by paperbacks and digest magazines, though new ones continued to appear as late as 1953. The last remaining science fiction pulp magazine that had not changed format, Science Fiction Quarterly, ceased publication in 1958; the last pulp magazine overall was Ranch Romances, the final issue of which was published in 1971.

== Definition ==
=== Start ===
Proposed starting points
Year	Notes	Ref.
1896	First pulp magazine: Argosy; Science fiction in general pulp magazines	
1923	First speculative fiction pulp magazine: Weird Tales "Scientific Fiction" issue of Science and Invention	
1926	First science fiction magazine: Amazing Stories	
1930	First sf pulp: Astounding Stories of Super-Science	

The launch of Amazing in 1926 is commonly regarded as the start of the pulp era of science fiction, for instance by Gary Westfahl and Marshall Tymn. Others who use 1926 as the starting point include Mike Ashley and Lisa Yaszek. Westfahl notes 1923 as another possible start point, with the launch of Weird Tales and the "Scientific Fiction" issue of Gernsback's Science and Invention.

Amelia Beamer writes that in the context of science fiction, the pulp era is usually held to have begun with the specialized magazines of the 1920s, rather than with the earlier general pulps. Nevertheless, the period when science fiction appeared in the general pulps is occasionally considered part of the pulp era; for instance, Michael R. Page counts the pulp era as beginning with Argosy in 1896.

Eric Leif Davin, who favours using the term as shorthand for the period 1926–1960, comments that technically speaking the pulp era of science fiction lasted a few years shorter than that—from the first issue of Astounding (January 1930) to the last issue of Science Fiction Quarterly (February 1958); similarly, The Encyclopedia of Science Fiction writes that "The era of the specialist sf pulp magazine [...] ran from 1930 to the mid-fifties".

=== End ===
Proposed endpoints
Year	Notes	Ref.
1937–1940	Beginning of the Golden Age of Science Fiction	
1952	(No explicit reason)	
Mid-1950s	Pulp die-off	
1955	Final issue of Thrilling Wonder Stories, Startling Stories, and Planet Stories	
1958	Final issue of Science Fiction Quarterly, the last remaining sf pulp	
1960	(No explicit reason)	

Beamer comments that the pulp era of science fiction is usually regarded to have ended with the demise of the pulps in the mid-1950s. Jess Nevins likewise locates the end of the pulp era to the mid-1950s in general. Westfahl regards the specific year 1955 as the end of the era, pointing to the demise of Thrilling Wonder Stories, Startling Stories, and Planet Stories. He also notes that E. Hoffmann Price considered 1952 the year the pulps died, and that this might also be taken as the endpoint. Nathan Vernon Madison counts the final issue of Science Fiction Quarterly in 1958 as the end of the era.

The pulp era is sometimes considered to have ended at the onset of the Golden Age of Science Fiction, and other times to overlap with or encompass it. The Golden Age is in turn generally held to have begun at or shortly after John W. Campbell's assumption of the editorship of Astounding in 1937. David M. Higgins and Roby Duncan, in The Science Fiction Handbook, count the Golden Age as succeeding the pulp era from 1937. Jeremy Withers takes the pulp era as ending, and the Golden Age as beginning, around 1940.

== Related terms ==
According to Adam Roberts, the pulp era is also sometimes known as the "Gernsback era" after Hugo Gernsback. Others consider the Gernsback era to be part of the broader pulp era. E. F. Bleiler and Richard Bleiler's 1998 reference work Science-Fiction: The Gernsback Years defines the period as starting in 1926 (when Gernsback founded Amazing) and ending in 1936 (the year Gernsback sold Wonder Stories).

Brian Attebery, in The Cambridge Companion to Science Fiction, labels the period from 1926 to 1960 the "magazine era" based on the dominance of this mode in shaping the direction and identity of the genre.

== See also ==
- Timeline of science fiction
