= Planets beyond Neptune =

Hypothetical planets further than Neptune

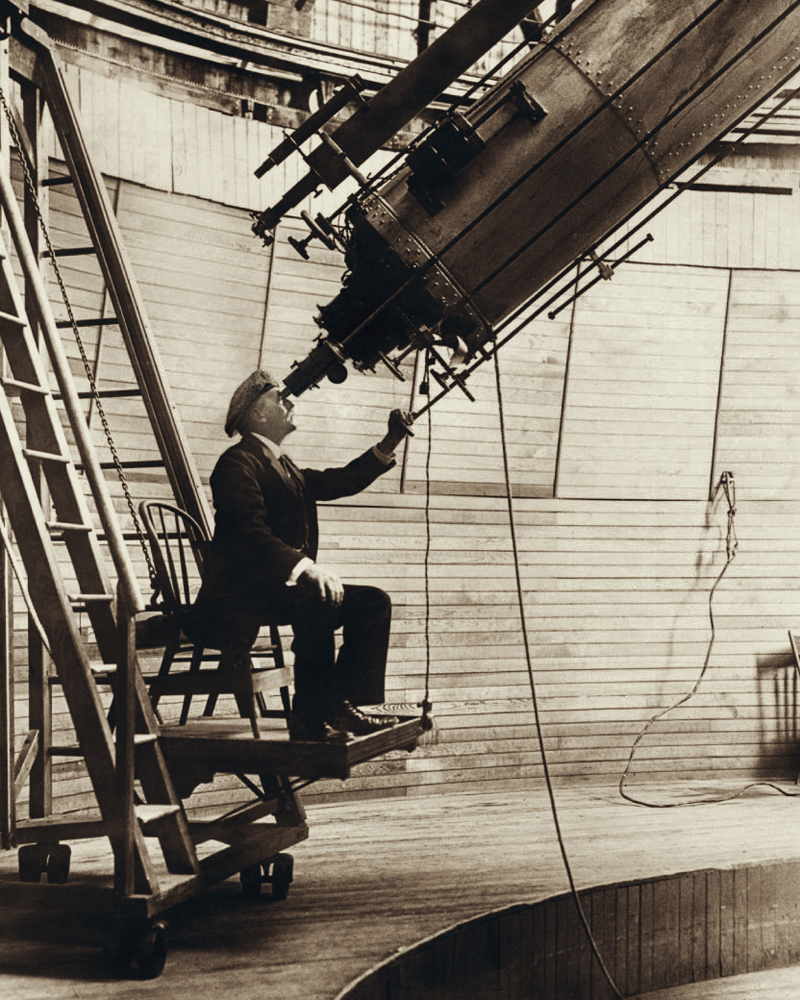
Percival Lowell, originator of the Planet X hypothesis

Following the discovery of the planet Neptune in 1846, there was considerable speculation that another planet might exist beyond its orbit. The search began in the mid-19th century and continued at the start of the 20th with Percival Lowell's quest for Planet X. Lowell proposed the Planet X hypothesis to explain apparent discrepancies in the orbits of the giant planets, particularly Uranus and Neptune, speculating that the gravity of a large unseen planet could have perturbed Uranus enough to account for the irregularities.

Though Clyde Tombaugh's discovery of Pluto in 1930 appeared to validate Lowell's hypothesis, the discovery of Pluto's moon Charon in 1978, which allowed Pluto's mass to be estimated, ultimately disproved it, resulting in a brief search for a tenth planet. The search was largely abandoned in the early 1990s, when a study of measurements made by the Voyager 2 spacecraft found that the irregularities observed in Uranus's orbit were due to a slight overestimation of Neptune's mass.

After 1992, the discovery of numerous small icy objects with similar or even wider orbits than Pluto led to a debate over whether Pluto should remain a planet, or whether it and its neighbours should, like the asteroids, be given their own separate classification. Although a number of the larger members of this group were initially described as planets, in 2006 the International Astronomical Union (IAU) reclassified Pluto and its largest neighbours as dwarf planets, leaving Neptune the farthest known planet in the Solar System.

While the astronomical community widely agrees that Planet X, as originally envisioned, does not exist, the concept of an as-yet-unobserved planet has been revived by a number of astronomers to explain other anomalies observed in the outer Solar System. As of March 2014, observations with the WISE telescope have ruled out the possibility of a Saturn-sized object (95 Earth masses) out to 10,000 AU and a Jupiter-sized or larger object (>318 Earth masses) out to 26,000 AU, which are both far beyond Neptune's 30 AU orbit.

In 2014, based on similarities of the orbits of a group of recently discovered extreme trans-Neptunian objects, astronomers hypothesized the existence of a super-Earth or ice giant planet, 2 to 15 times the mass of the Earth and beyond 200 AU with possibly a highly inclined orbit at some 1,500 AU. In 2016, further work showed this unknown distant planet is likely to be on an inclined, eccentric orbit that goes no closer than about 200 AU and no farther than about 1,200 AU from the Sun. The orbit is predicted to be anti-aligned to the clustered extreme trans-Neptunian objects. Because Pluto is no longer considered a planet by the IAU, this new hypothetical object has become known as Planet Nine.

== Early speculation ==
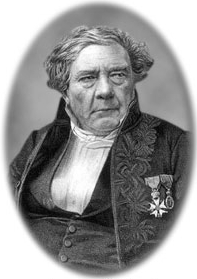
Jacques Babinet, an early proponent of a trans-Neptunian planet

In the 1840s, the French mathematician Urbain Le Verrier used Newtonian mechanics to analyse perturbations in the orbit of Uranus, and hypothesised that they were caused by the gravitational pull of a yet-undiscovered planet. Le Verrier predicted the position of this new planet and sent his calculations to German astronomer Johann Gottfried Galle. On 23 September 1846, the night following his receipt of the letter, Galle and his student Heinrich d'Arrest discovered Neptune, exactly where Le Verrier had predicted. There remained some slight discrepancies in the giant planets' orbits. These were taken to indicate the existence of yet another planet orbiting beyond Neptune.

Even before Neptune's discovery, some speculated that one planet alone was not enough to explain the discrepancy. On 17 November 1834, the British amateur astronomer the Reverend Thomas John Hussey reported a conversation he had had with French astronomer Alexis Bouvard to George Biddell Airy, the British Astronomer Royal. Hussey reported that when he suggested to Bouvard that the unusual motion of Uranus might be due to the gravitational influence of an undiscovered planet, Bouvard replied that the idea had occurred to him, and that he had corresponded with Peter Andreas Hansen, director of the Seeberg Observatory in Gotha, about the subject. Hansen's opinion was that a single body could not adequately explain the motion of Uranus, and postulated that two planets lay beyond Uranus.

In 1848, Jacques Babinet raised an objection to Le Verrier's calculations, claiming that Neptune's observed mass was smaller and its orbit larger than Le Verrier had initially predicted. He postulated, based largely on simple subtraction from Le Verrier's calculations, that another planet of roughly 12 Earth masses, which he named "Hyperion", must exist beyond Neptune, which would orbit the Sun every 336 years at a distance of 48 AU. Le Verrier denounced Babinet's hypothesis, saying, "[There is] absolutely nothing by which one could determine the position of another planet, barring hypotheses in which imagination played too large a part."

In 1850 James Ferguson, Assistant Astronomer at the United States Naval Observatory, noted that he had "lost" a star he had observed, GR1719k, which Lt. Matthew Maury, the superintendent of the Observatory, claimed was evidence that it must be a new planet. Subsequent searches failed to recover the "planet" in a different position, and in 1878, CHF Peters, director of the Hamilton College Observatory in New York, showed that the star had not in fact vanished, and that the previous results had been due to human error.

In 1879, Camille Flammarion noted that the comets 1862 III and 1889 III had aphelia of 47 and 49 AU, respectively, suggesting that they might mark the orbital radius of an unknown planet that had dragged them into an elliptical orbit. Astronomer George Forbes concluded on the basis of this evidence that two planets must exist beyond Neptune. He calculated, based on the fact that four comets possessed aphelia at around 100 AU and a further six with aphelia clustered at around 300 AU, the orbital elements of a pair of hypothetical trans-Neptunian planets. These elements accorded suggestively with those made independently by another astronomer named David Peck Todd, suggesting to many that they might be valid. However, sceptics argued that the orbits of the comets involved were still too uncertain to produce meaningful results. Some have considered Forbes's hypothesis a precursor to Planet Nine.

In 1900 and 1901, Harvard College Observatory director William Henry Pickering led two searches for trans-Neptunian planets. The first was begun by Danish astronomer Hans Emil Lau who, after studying the data on the orbit of Uranus from 1690 to 1895, concluded that one trans-Neptunian planet alone could not account for the discrepancies in its orbit, and postulated the positions of two planets he believed were responsible. The second was launched when Gabriel Dallet suggested that a single trans-Neptunian planet lying at 47 AU could account for the motion of Uranus. Pickering agreed to examine plates for any suspected planets. In neither case were any found.

In 1902, after observing the orbits of comets with aphelia beyond Neptune, Theodor Grigull of Münster, Germany proclaimed the existence of a Uranus-sized planet at 50 AU with a 360-year period, which he named Hades, cross-checking with the deviations in the orbit of Uranus. In 1921, Grigull revised his orbital period to 310–330 years, to better fit the observed deviations.

In 1909, Thomas Jefferson Jackson See, an astronomer with a reputation as an egocentric contrarian, opined "there is certainly one, most likely two and possibly three planets beyond Neptune". Tentatively naming the first planet "Oceanus", he placed their respective distances at 42, 56 and 72 AU from the Sun. He gave no indication as to how he determined their existence, and no known searches were mounted to locate them.

In 1911, Indian astronomer Venkatesh Ketakar suggested the existence of two trans-Neptunian planets, which he named after the Hindu gods Brahma and Vishnu, by reworking the patterns observed by Pierre-Simon Laplace in the planetary satellites of Jupiter and applying them to the outer planets. The three inner Galilean moons of Jupiter, Io, Europa and Ganymede, are locked in a complicated 1:2:4 resonance called a Laplace resonance. Ketakar suggested that Uranus, Neptune and his hypothetical trans-Neptunian planets were also locked in Laplace-like resonances. This is incorrect; Uranus and Neptune, while in a near-2:1 resonance, are not in full resonance. His calculations predicted a mean distance for Brahma of 38.95 AU and an orbital period of 242.28 Earth years (3:4 resonance with Neptune). When Pluto was discovered 19 years later, its mean distance of 39.48 AU and orbital period of 248 Earth years were close to Ketakar's prediction (Pluto in fact has a 2:3 resonance with Neptune). Ketakar made no predictions for the orbital elements other than mean distance and period. It is not clear how Ketakar arrived at these figures, and his second planet, Vishnu, was never located.

== Planet X ==
In 1894, with the help of William Pickering, Percival Lowell (a wealthy Bostonian) founded the Lowell Observatory in Flagstaff, Arizona. In 1906, convinced he could resolve the conundrum of Uranus's orbit, he began an extensive project to search for a trans-Neptunian planet, which he named Planet X, a name previously used by Gabriel Dallet. The X in the name represents an unknown and is pronounced as the letter, as opposed to the Roman numeral for 10 (at the time, Planet X would have been the ninth planet). Lowell's hope in tracking down Planet X was to establish his scientific credibility, which had eluded him due to his widely derided belief that channel-like features visible on the surface of Mars were canals constructed by an intelligent civilization.

Lowell's first search focused on the ecliptic, the plane encompassed by the zodiac where the other planets in the Solar System lie. Using a 5-inch photographic camera, he manually examined over 200 three-hour exposures with a magnifying glass, and found no planets. At that time Pluto was too far above the ecliptic to be imaged by the survey. After revising his predicted possible locations, Lowell conducted a second search from 1914 to 1916. In 1915, he published his Memoir of a Trans-Neptunian Planet, in which he concluded that Planet X had a mass roughly seven times that of Earth—about half that of Neptune—and a mean distance from the Sun of 43 AU. He assumed Planet X would be a large, low-density object with a high albedo, like the giant planets. As a result, it would show a disc with diameter of about one arcsecond and an apparent magnitude between 12 and 13—bright enough to be spotted.

Separately, in 1908, Pickering announced that, by analysing irregularities in Uranus's orbit, he had found evidence for a ninth planet. His hypothetical planet, which he termed "Planet O" (because it came after "N", i.e. Neptune), possessed a mean orbital radius of 51.9 AU and an orbital period of 373.5 years. Plates taken at his observatory in Arequipa, Peru, showed no evidence for the predicted planet, and British astronomer P. H. Cowell showed that the irregularities observed in Uranus's orbit virtually disappeared once the planet's displacement of longitude was taken into account. Lowell himself, despite his close association with Pickering, dismissed Planet O out of hand, saying, "This planet is very properly designated "O", [for it] is nothing at all." Unbeknownst to Pickering, four of the photographic plates taken in the search for "Planet O" by astronomers at the Mount Wilson Observatory in 1919 captured images of Pluto, though this was only recognised years later. Pickering went on to suggest many other possible trans-Neptunian planets up to the year 1932, which he named P, Q, R, S, T, and U; none were ever detected.

=== Discovery of Pluto ===
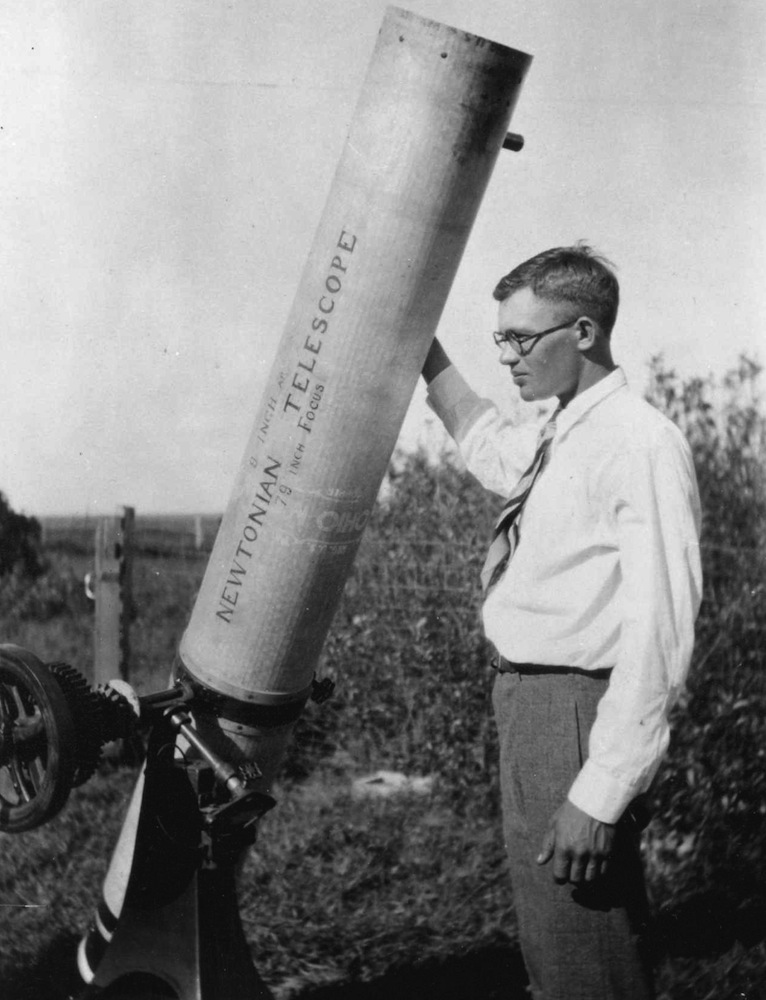
Clyde William Tombaugh

Lowell's sudden death in 1916 temporarily halted the search for Planet X. Failing to find the planet, according to one friend, "virtually killed him". Lowell's widow, Constance, engaged in a legal battle with the observatory over Lowell's legacy which halted the search for Planet X for several years. In 1925, the observatory obtained glass discs for a new 13 in (33 cm) wide-field telescope to continue the search, constructed with funds from Abbott Lawrence Lowell, Percival's brother. In 1929 the observatory's director, Vesto Melvin Slipher, summarily handed the job of locating the planet to Clyde Tombaugh, a 22-year-old Kansas farm boy who had only just arrived at the Lowell Observatory after Slipher had been impressed by a sample of his astronomical drawings.

Tombaugh's task was to systematically capture sections of the night sky in pairs of images. Each image in a pair was taken two weeks apart. He then placed both images of each section in a machine called a blink comparator, which by exchanging images quickly created a time lapse illusion of the movement of any planetary body. To reduce the chances that a faster-moving (and thus closer) object be mistaken for the new planet, Tombaugh imaged each region near its opposition point, 180 degrees from the Sun, where the apparent retrograde motion for objects beyond Earth's orbit is at its strongest. He also took a third image as a control to eliminate any false results caused by defects in an individual plate. Tombaugh decided to image the entire zodiac, rather than focus on those regions suggested by Lowell.

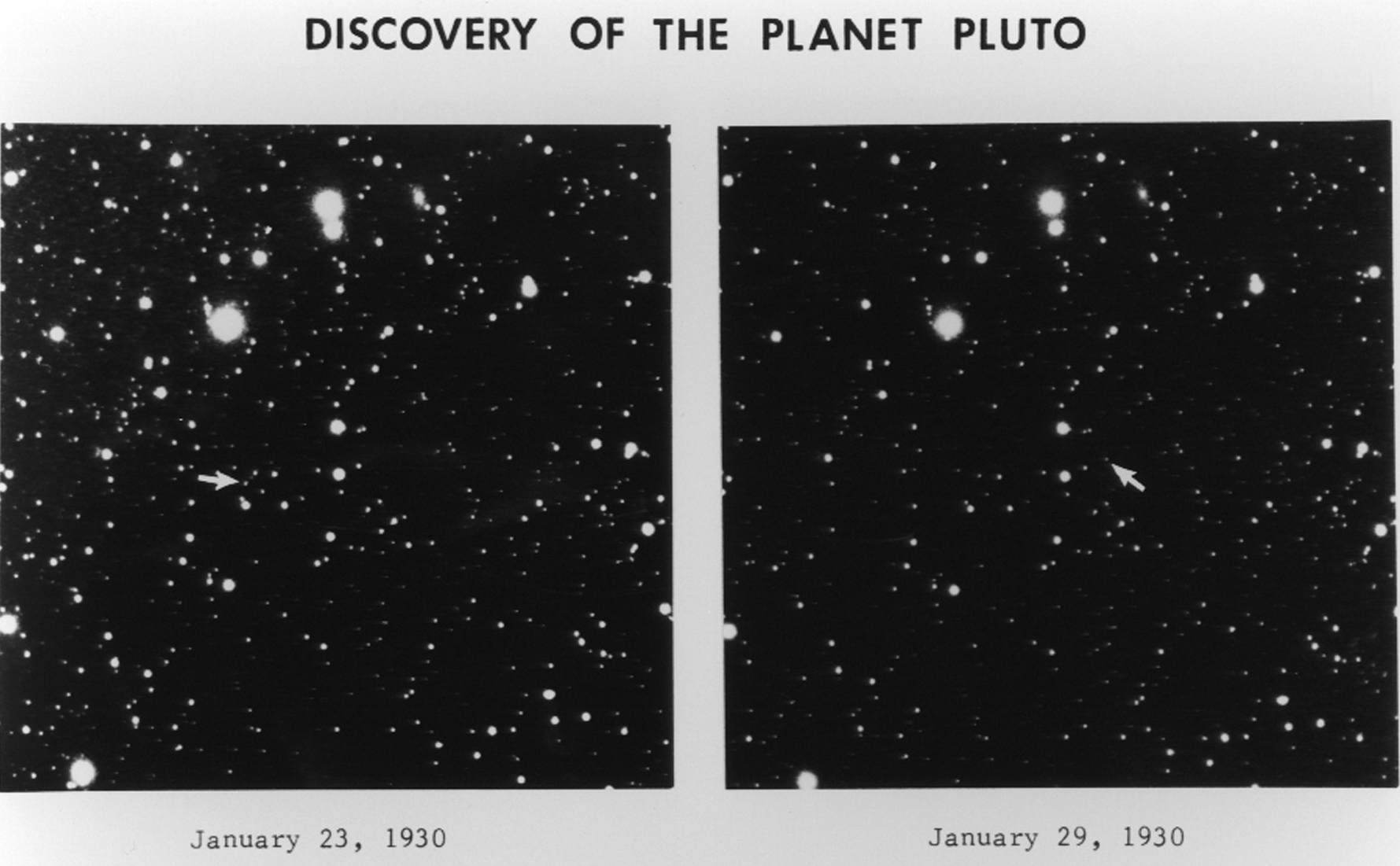
Discovery photographs of Pluto

By the beginning of 1930, Tombaugh's search had reached the constellation of Gemini. On 18 February 1930, after searching for nearly a year and examining nearly 2 million stars, Tombaugh discovered a moving object on photographic plates taken on 23 January and 29 January of that year. A lesser-quality photograph taken on January 21 confirmed the movement. Upon confirmation, Tombaugh walked into Slipher's office and declared, "Doctor Slipher, I have found your Planet X." The object was just six degrees from one of two locations for Planet X Lowell had suggested; thus it seemed he had at last been vindicated. After the observatory obtained further confirmatory photographs, news of the discovery was telegraphed to the Harvard College Observatory on March 13, 1930. The new object was later precovered on photographs dating back to 19 March 1915. The decision to name the object Pluto was intended in part to honour Percival Lowell, as his initials made up the word's first two letters. After discovering Pluto, Tombaugh continued to search the ecliptic for other distant objects. He found hundreds of variable stars and asteroids, as well as two comets, but no further planets.

=== Pluto loses Planet X title ===
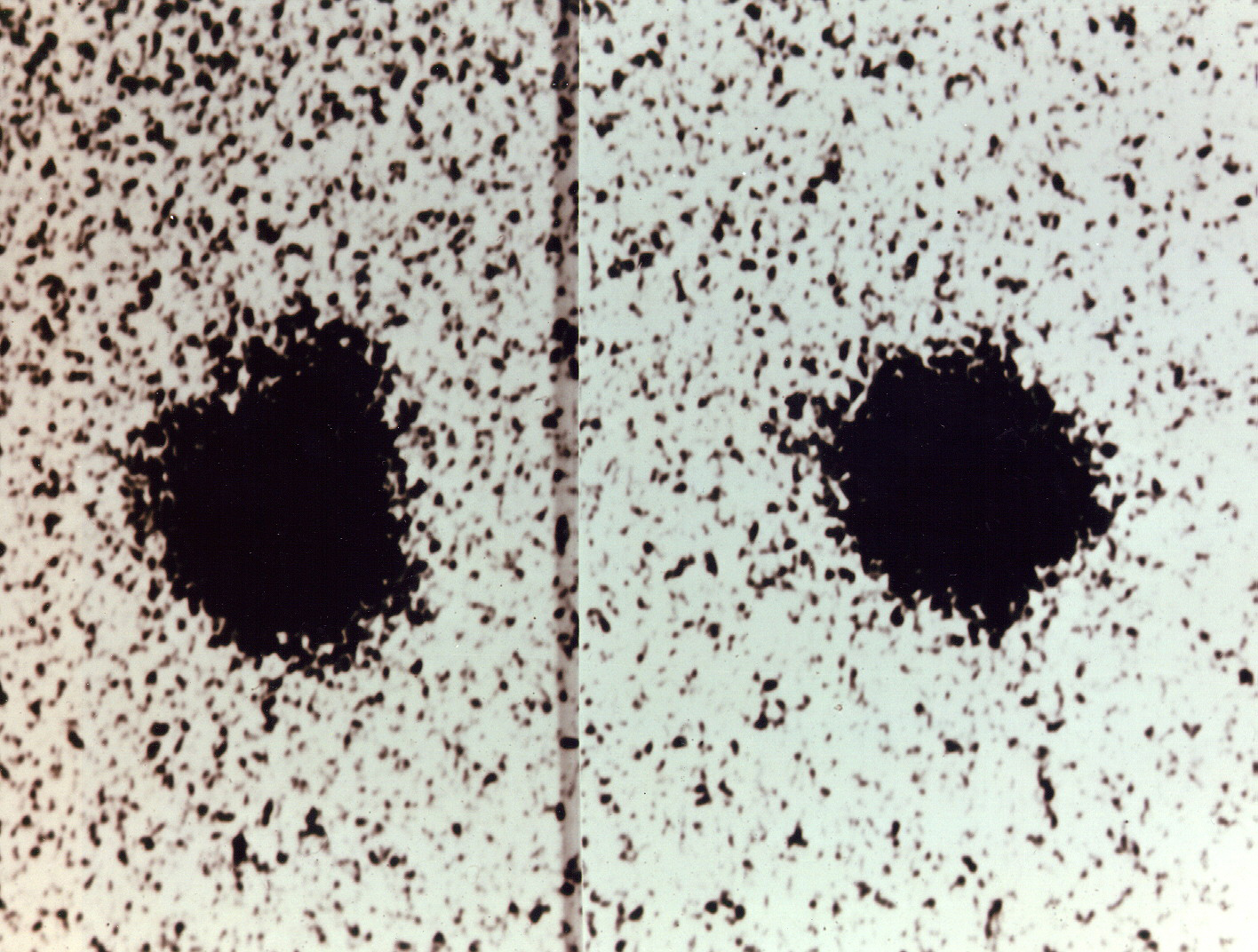
Discovery image of Charon

To the observatory's disappointment and surprise, Pluto showed no visible disc; it appeared as a point, no different from a star, and, at only 15th magnitude, was six times dimmer than Lowell had predicted, which meant it was either very small, or very dark. Because of Lowell's predictions, astronomers thought that Pluto would be massive enough to perturb planets. This led them to assume that its albedo could be no less than 0.07 (meaning that, at minimum, it would reflect 7% of the light that hit it), which would have made Pluto about as dark as asphalt, and similar in reflectivity to the least reflective planet, which is Mercury. This would have given Pluto an estimated mass of no more than 70% that of Earth. Observations also revealed that Pluto's orbit was very elliptical, far more than that of any other planet.

Almost immediately, some astronomers questioned Pluto's status as a planet. Barely a month after its discovery was announced, on 14 April 1930, in an article in The New York Times, Armin O. Leuschner suggested that Pluto's dimness and high orbital eccentricity made it more similar to an asteroid or comet: "The Lowell result confirms the possible high eccentricity announced by us on 5 April. Among the possibilities are a large asteroid greatly disturbed in its orbit by close approach to a major planet such as Jupiter, or it may be one of many long-period planetary objects yet to be discovered, or a bright cometary object." In that same article, Harvard Observatory director Harlow Shapley wrote that Pluto was a "member of the Solar System not comparable with known asteroids and comets, and perhaps of greater importance to cosmogony than would be another major planet beyond Neptune." In 1931, after examining the structure of the residuals of Uranus' longitude using a trigonometric formula, Ernest W. Brown asserted (in agreement with E. C. Bower) that the presumed irregularities in the orbit of Uranus could not be due to the gravitational effect of a more distant planet, and thus that Lowell's supposed prediction was "purely accidental".

Throughout the mid-20th century, estimates of Pluto's mass were revised downward. In 1931, Nicholson and Mayall calculated its mass, based on its supposed effect on the giant planets, as roughly that of Earth; a value somewhat in accord with the 0.91 Earth mass calculated in 1942 by Lloyd R. Wylie at the US Naval Observatory, using the same assumptions. In 1949, Gerard Kuiper's measurements of Pluto's diameter with the 200-inch telescope at Mount Palomar Observatory led him to the conclusion that it was midway in size between Mercury and Mars and that its mass was most probably about 0.1 Earth mass.

In 1973, based on the similarities in the periodicity and amplitude of brightness variation with Triton, Dennis Rawlins conjectured Pluto's mass must be similar to Triton's. In retrospect, the conjecture turns out to have been correct; it had been argued by astronomers Walter Baade and E.C. Bower as early as 1934. However, because Triton's mass was then believed to be roughly 2.5% of the Earth–Moon system (more than ten times its actual value), Rawlins's determination for Pluto's mass was similarly incorrect. It was nonetheless a meagre enough value for him to conclude Pluto was not Planet X. In 1976, Dale Cruikshank, Carl Pilcher, and David Morrison of the University of Hawaii analysed spectra from Pluto's surface and determined that it must contain methane ice, which is highly reflective. This meant that Pluto, far from being dark, was in fact exceptionally bright, and thus was probably no more than 1/100 Earth mass.

Mass estimates for Pluto
Year	Mass	Notes
1931	1 Earth	Nicholson & Mayall
1942	0.91 Earth	Wylie
1948	0.1 (1/10 Earth)	Kuiper
1973	0.025 (1/40 Earth)	Rawlins
1976	0.01 (1/100 Earth)	Cruikshank, Pilcher, & Morrison
1978	0.002 (1/500 Earth)	Christy & Harrington
2006	0.00218 (1/459 Earth)	Buie et al.

Pluto's size was finally determined conclusively in 1978, when American astronomer James W. Christy discovered its moon Charon. This enabled him, together with Robert Sutton Harrington of the U.S. Naval Observatory, to measure the mass of the Pluto–Charon system directly by observing the moon's orbital motion around Pluto. They determined Pluto's mass to be 1.31×10^{22} kg; roughly one five-hundredth that of Earth or one-sixth that of the Moon, and far too small to account for the observed discrepancies in the orbits of the outer planets. Lowell's prediction had been a coincidence: If there was a Planet X, it was not Pluto.

=== Further searches for Planet X ===
After 1978, a number of astronomers kept up the search for Lowell's Planet X, convinced that, because Pluto was no longer a viable candidate, an unseen tenth planet must have been perturbing the outer planets.

In the 1980s and 1990s, Robert Harrington led a search to determine the real cause of the apparent irregularities. He calculated that any Planet X would be at roughly three times the distance of Neptune from the Sun; its orbit would be highly eccentric, and strongly inclined to the ecliptic—the planet's orbit would be at roughly a 32-degree angle from the orbital plane of the other known planets. This hypothesis was met with a mixed reception. Noted Planet X skeptic Brian G. Marsden of the Minor Planet Center pointed out that these discrepancies were a hundredth the size of those noticed by Le Verrier, and could easily be due to observational error.

In 1972, Joseph Brady of the Lawrence Livermore National Laboratory studied irregularities in the motion of Halley's Comet. Brady claimed that they could have been caused by a Jupiter-sized planet beyond Neptune at 59 AU that is in a retrograde orbit around the Sun. However, both Marsden and Planet X proponent P. Kenneth Seidelmann attacked the hypothesis, showing that Halley's Comet randomly and irregularly ejects jets of material, causing changes to its own orbital trajectory, and that such a massive object as Brady's Planet X would have severely affected the orbits of known outer planets.

Although its mission did not involve a search for Planet X, the IRAS space observatory made headlines briefly in 1983 due to an "unknown object" that was at first described as "possibly as large as the giant planet Jupiter and possibly so close to Earth that it would be part of this Solar System". Further analysis revealed that of several unidentified objects, nine were distant galaxies and the tenth was "interstellar cirrus"; none were found to be Solar System bodies.

In 1988, A. A. Jackson and R. M. Killen studied the stability of Pluto's resonance with Neptune by placing test "Planet X-es" with various masses and at various distances from Pluto. Pluto and Neptune's orbits are in a 3:2 resonance, which prevents their collision or even any close approaches, regardless of their separation in the z axis. It was found that the hypothetical object's mass had to exceed 5 Earth masses to break the resonance, and the parameter space is quite large and a large variety of objects could have existed beyond Pluto without disturbing the resonance. Four test orbits of a trans-Plutonian planet have been integrated forward for four million years in order to determine the effects of such a body on the stability of the Neptune–Pluto 3:2 resonance. Planets beyond Pluto with masses of 0.1 and 1.0 Earth masses in orbits at 48.3 and 75.5 AU, respectively, do not disturb the 3:2 resonance. Test planets of 5 Earth masses with semi-major axes of 52.5 and 62.5 AU disrupt the four-million-year libration of Pluto's argument of perihelion.

=== Planet X disproved ===
Harrington died in January 1993, without having found Planet X. Six months before, E. Myles Standish had used data from Voyager 2's 1989 flyby of Neptune, which had revised the planet's total mass downward by 0.5%—an amount comparable to the mass of Mars—to recalculate its gravitational effect on Uranus. When Neptune's newly determined mass was used in the Jet Propulsion Laboratory Developmental Ephemeris (JPL DE), the supposed discrepancies in the Uranian orbit, and with them the need for a Planet X, vanished. There are no discrepancies in the trajectories of any space probes such as Pioneer 10, Pioneer 11, Voyager 1, and Voyager 2 that can be attributed to the gravitational pull of a large undiscovered object in the outer Solar System. Today, most astronomers agree that Planet X, as Lowell defined it, does not exist.

== Discovery of further trans-Neptunian objects ==
After the discovery of Pluto and Charon, no more trans-Neptunian objects (TNOs) were found until 15760 Albion in 1992. Since then, thousands of such objects have been discovered. Most are now recognized as part of the Kuiper belt, a swarm of icy bodies left over from the Solar System's formation that orbit near the ecliptic plane just beyond Neptune. Though none were as large as Pluto, some of these distant trans-Neptunian objects, such as Sedna, were initially described in the media as "new planets".

In 2005, astronomer Mike Brown and his team announced the discovery of 2003 UB_{313} (later named Eris after the Greek goddess of discord and strife), a trans-Neptunian object then thought to be just barely larger than Pluto. Soon afterwards, a NASA Jet Propulsion Laboratory press release described the object as the "tenth planet".

Eris was never officially classified as a planet, and the 2006 definition of planet defined both Eris and Pluto not as planets but as dwarf planets because they have not cleared their neighbourhoods. They do not orbit the Sun alone, but as part of a population of similarly sized objects. Pluto itself is now recognized as being a member of the Kuiper belt and the largest dwarf planet, larger than the more massive Eris.

A number of astronomers, most notably Alan Stern, the head of NASA's New Horizons mission to Pluto, contend that the IAU's definition is flawed, and that Pluto and Eris, and all large trans-Neptunian objects, such as Makemake, Sedna, Quaoar, Gonggong and Haumea, should be considered planets in their own right. However, the discovery of Eris did not rehabilitate the Planet X theory because it is far too small to have significant effects on the outer planets' orbits.

== Subsequently proposed trans-Neptunian planets ==
Although most astronomers accept that Lowell's Planet X does not exist, a number have revived the idea that a large unseen planet could create observable gravitational effects in the outer Solar System. These hypothetical objects are often referred to as "Planet X", although the conception of these objects may differ considerably from that proposed by Lowell.

=== Orbits of distant objects ===
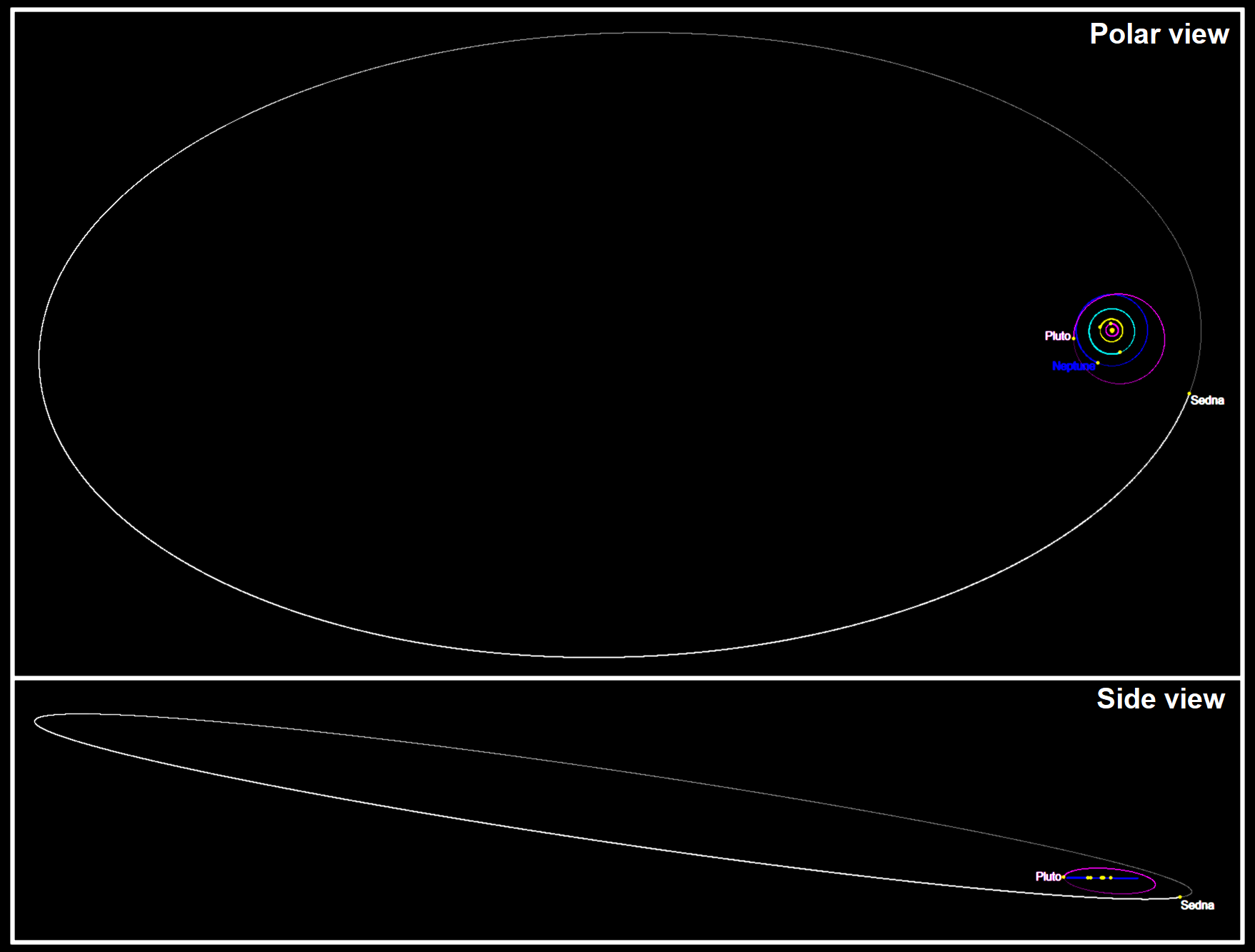
The orbit of Sedna (red) set against the orbits of Jupiter (orange), Saturn (yellow), Uranus (green), Neptune (blue), and Pluto (purple)

==== Sedna's orbit ====
When Sedna was discovered, its extreme orbit raised questions about its origin. Its perihelion is so distant (approximately 76 AU (11.4 billion km; 7.1 billion mi)) that no currently observed mechanism can explain Sedna's eccentric distant orbit. It is too far from the planets to have been affected by the gravity of Neptune or the other giant planets and too bound to the Sun to be affected by outside forces such as the galactic tides. Hypotheses to explain its orbit include that it was affected by a passing star, that it was captured from another planetary system, or that it was tugged into its current position by a trans-Neptunian planet. The most obvious solution to determining Sedna's peculiar orbit would be to locate a number of objects in a similar region, whose various orbital configurations would provide an indication as to their history. If Sedna had been pulled into its orbit by a trans-Neptunian planet, any other objects found in its region would have a similar perihelion to Sedna (around 80 AU (12 billion km; 7.4 billion mi)).

==== Excitement of Kuiper belt orbits ====
In 2008, Tadashi Mukai and Patryk Sofia Lykawka suggested a distant Mars- or Earth-sized planet, currently in a highly eccentric orbit between 100 and 200 AU and orbital period of 1000 years with an inclination of 20° to 40°, was responsible for the structure of the Kuiper belt. They proposed that the perturbations of this planet excited the eccentricities and inclinations of the trans-Neptunian objects, truncated the planetesimal disk at 48 AU, and detached the orbits of objects like Sedna from Neptune. During Neptune's migration this planet is posited to have been captured in an outer resonance of Neptune and to have evolved into a higher perihelion orbit due to the Kozai mechanism leaving the remaining trans-Neptunian objects on stable orbits.

==== Elongated orbits of group of Kuiper belt objects ====
In 2012, Rodney Gomes modelled the orbits of 92 Kuiper belt objects and found that six of those orbits were far more elongated than the model predicted. He concluded that the simplest explanation was the gravitational pull of a distant planetary companion, such as a Neptune-sized object at 1,500 AU. This Neptune-sized object would cause the perihelia of objects with semi-major axes greater than 300 AU to oscillate, delivering them into planet-crossing orbits like those of (308933) 2006 SQ372 and (87269) 2000 OO67 or detached orbits like Sedna's.

==== Planet Nine ====
Planet Nine is a hypothetical ninth planet in the outer region of the Solar System. Its gravitational effects could explain the peculiar clustering of orbits for a group of extreme trans-Neptunian objects (ETNOs)—bodies beyond Neptune that orbit the Sun at distances averaging more than 250 times that of the Earth, over 250 astronomical units (AU).

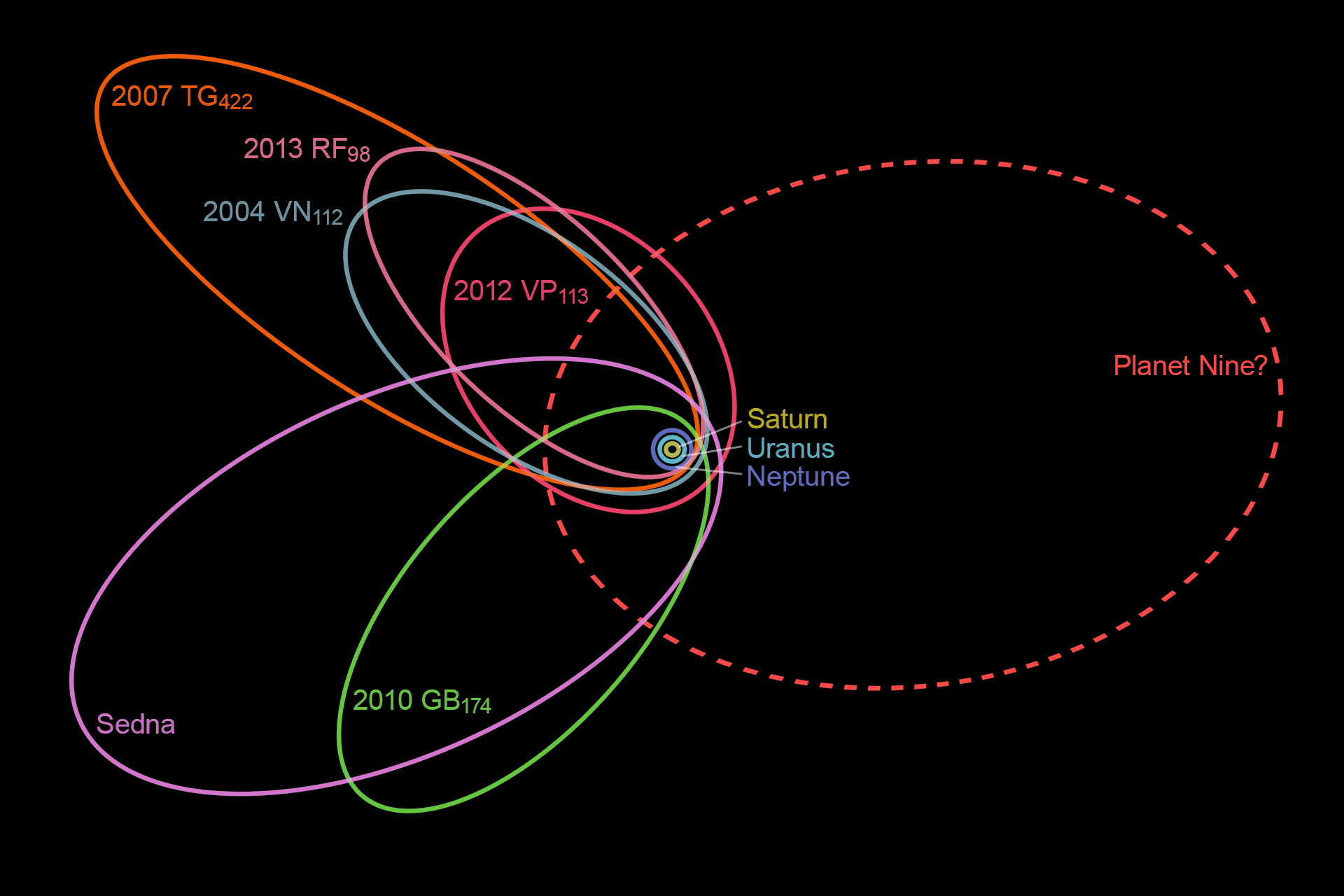
Prediction of hypothetical Planet Nine's orbit based on unique clustering

In 2014, astronomers announced the discovery of 2012 VP113, a large object with a Sedna-like 4,200-year orbit and a perihelion of roughly 80 AU, which led them to suggest that it offered evidence of a potential trans-Neptunian planet. Trujillo and Sheppard argued that the orbital clustering of arguments of perihelia for 2012 VP_{113} and other extremely distant TNOs suggests the existence of a "super-Earth" of between 2 and 15 Earth masses beyond 200 AU and possibly on an inclined orbit at 1,500 AU.

In 2014 astronomers at the Universidad Complutense in Madrid suggested that the available data actually indicates more than one trans-Neptunian planet; subsequent work further suggests that the evidence is robust enough but rather than connected with the longitudes of the ascending nodes and the arguments of perihelia, semi-major axes and nodal distances could be the signposts. Additional work based on improved orbits of 39 objects still indicates that more than one perturber could be present and that one of them could orbit the Sun at 300–400 AU.

On 20 January 2016, Brown and Konstantin Batygin published an article corroborating Trujillo and Sheppard's initial findings; proposing a super-Earth (dubbed Planet Nine) based on a statistical clustering of the arguments of perihelia (noted before) near zero and also ascending nodes near 113° of six distant trans-Neptunian objects. They estimated it to be ten times the mass of Earth (about 60% the mass of Neptune) with a semimajor axis of approximately 400–1500 AU.

=== Probability ===
Even without gravitational evidence, Mike Brown, the discoverer of Sedna, has argued that Sedna's 12,000-year orbit means that probability alone suggests that an Earth-sized object exists beyond Neptune. Sedna's orbit is so eccentric that it spends only a small fraction of its orbital period near the Sun, where it can be easily observed. This means that unless its discovery was a freak accident, there is probably a substantial population of objects roughly Sedna's diameter yet to be observed in its orbital region. Mike Brown noted that

Sedna is about three-quarters the size of Pluto. If there are sixty objects three-quarters the size of Pluto [out there] then there are probably forty objects the size of Pluto ... If there are forty objects the size of Pluto, then there are probably ten that are twice the size of Pluto. There are probably three or four that are three times the size of Pluto, and the biggest of these objects ... is probably the size of Mars or the size of the Earth.

However, Brown notes that even though it might approach or exceed Earth in size, should such an object be found it would still be a "dwarf planet" by the current definition, because it would not have cleared its neighbourhood sufficiently.

=== Kuiper cliff and "Planet Ten" ===
Additionally, speculation of a possible trans-Neptunian planet has revolved around the so-called "Kuiper cliff". The Kuiper belt terminates suddenly at a distance of 48 AU (7.2 billion km; 4.5 billion mi) from the Sun. Brunini and Melita have speculated that this sudden drop-off may be attributed to the presence of an object with a mass between those of Mars and Earth located beyond 48 AU.

The presence of an object with a mass similar to that of Mars in a circular orbit at 60 AU (9.0 billion km; 5.6 billion mi) leads to a trans-Neptunian object population incompatible with observations. For instance, it would severely deplete the plutino population. Astronomers have not excluded the possibility of an object with a mass similar to that of Earth located farther than 100 AU (15 billion km; 9.3 billion mi) with an eccentric and inclined orbit. Computer simulations by Patryk Lykawka of Kobe University have suggested that an object with a mass between 0.3~0.7 M_{🜨} and diameter of 10,000 to 16,000 km, ejected outward by Neptune early in the Solar System's formation and currently in an elongated orbit between 101 and 200 AU (15.1 and 29.9 billion km; 9.4 and 18.6 billion mi) from the Sun, could explain the Kuiper cliff and the peculiar detached objects such as Sedna and 2012 VP113. In a 2023 follow-up paper, Lykawka gave his trans-Neptunian planet, which he dubbed the "Kuiper Belt planet", a mass of 1.5 to 3 M_{🜨}, a semi-major axis between 250 and 500 AU, and an orbital inclination of 30 degrees, but did not attribute the Kuiper cliff (or the putative orbital clustering attributed to Planet Nine) to its existence.

Although some astronomers, such as Renu Malhotra and David Jewitt, have cautiously supported these claims, others, such as Alessandro Morbidelli, have dismissed them as "contrived". Malhotra & Volk (2017) argued that an unexpected variance in inclination for KBOs farther than the cliff at 50 AU (7.5 billion km; 4.6 billion mi) provided evidence of a possible Mars-sized planet, with an upper mass limit up to 2.4 M_{🜨}, residing at the edge of the Solar System, which many news sources began referring to as "Planet Ten".

Starting in 2018, several surveys have discovered multiple objects located beyond the Kuiper Cliff. Some of these new discoveries are close to the heliopause (120 AU) or well beyond it (2018 VG18, 2018 AG37, 2020 BE102, 2020 MK53). An analysis of the TNO data available prior to September 2023 shows that there is a gap at about 72 AU, far from any mean-motion resonances with Neptune. Such a gap may have been induced by a massive perturber located further away.

In August 2025, a scientific team led by Amir Siraj determined the likelihood of a perturber planet being responsible for the gap and its 15-degree-inclination at more than 95%. They assume the perturber they refer to as "Planet Y" to be of a size between Mercury's and Earth's and at a distance of 100–200 AU from the Sun.

=== Captured rogue planets ===
Rogue planets are planets not gravitationally bound to any star or stellar remnant. Simulations by A. Siraj in 2023, looking at the possibility of the Solar System having captured a rogue planet earlier in its history and based on a mass function of terrestrial-mass rogue planets, suggest that the expected number of captured rogue planets in the outer Solar System with masses greater than that of Mars (a tenth the mass of the Earth) is 1.2, while 2.7 with masses comparable to Mars and 5.2 with masses comparable to Mercury (5.5% the mass of Earth) may exist. These captured planets would have a medium distance of 1,400 AU with roughly half of them existing in the range of 600 to 3,500 AU. Assuming these rogue planets have albedos of 0.2, it is expected that the Legacy Survey of Space and Time may discover 0.9 Mars-sized captured rogue planets and 1.4 Mercury-sized ones.

=== Other proposed planets ===
Tyche was a hypothetical gas giant proposed to be located in the Solar System's Oort cloud. It was first proposed in 1999 by astrophysicists John Matese, Patrick Whitman and Daniel Whitmire of the University of Louisiana at Lafayette. They argued that evidence of Tyche's existence could be seen in a supposed bias in the points of origin for long-period comets. In 2013, Matese and Whitmire re-evaluated the comet data and noted that Tyche, if it existed, would be detectable in the archive of data that was collected by NASA's Wide-field Infrared Survey Explorer (WISE) telescope. In 2014, NASA announced that the WISE survey had ruled out any object with Tyche's characteristics, indicating that Tyche as hypothesized by Matese, Whitman, and Whitmire does not exist.

Conversely, in 1999, British astronomer John Murray theorized the existence of a Jupiter-sized planet similar to Tyche 32,000 astronomical units away from the Sun in a retrograde orbit. Murray estimates that the planet would be located in the constellation of Delphinus. These parameters, also based on the orbits of various long-period comets, are different from those originally hypothesized by Matese, Whitman, and Whitmire for Tyche, and hence signify a different object. Unlike Tyche, this putative planet lies outside the 26,000 AU limit set by mid-infrared observations by the WISE telescope, but this limit can be as high as 82,000 AU based on albedo. A brown dwarf, for instance, would have a smaller albedo than a Jupiter analog.

The oligarch theory of planet formation states that there were hundreds of planet-sized objects, known as oligarchs, in the early stages of the Solar System's evolution. In 2005, astronomer Eugene Chiang speculated that although some of these oligarchs became the planets we know today, most would have been flung outward by gravitational interactions. Some may have escaped the Solar System altogether to become free-floating planets, whereas others would be orbiting in a halo around the Solar System, with orbital periods of millions of years. This halo would lie at between 1,000 and 10,000 AU (150 and 1,500 billion km; 93 and 930 billion mi) from the Sun, or between a third and a thirtieth the distance to the Oort cloud.

In December 2015, astronomers at the Atacama Large Millimeter Array (ALMA) detected a brief series of 350 GHz pulses that they concluded must either be a series of independent sources, or a single, fast moving source. Deciding that the latter was the most likely, they calculated based on its speed that, were it bound to the Sun, the object, which they named "Gna" after a fast-moving messenger goddess in Norse mythology, would be about 12–25 AU distant and have a dwarf planet-sized diameter of 220 to 880 km. However, if it were a rogue planet not gravitationally bound to the Sun, and as far away as 4000 AU, it could be much larger. The paper was never formally accepted, and has been withdrawn until the detection is confirmed. Scientists' reactions to the notice were largely sceptical; Mike Brown commented that, "If it is true that ALMA accidentally discovered a massive outer Solar System object in its tiny, tiny, tiny, field of view, that would suggest that there are something like 200,000 Earth-sized planets in the outer Solar System ... Even better, I just realized that this many Earth-sized planets existing would destabilize the entire Solar System and we would all die."

== Constraints on additional planets ==
As of 2023 the following observations severely constrain the mass and distance of any possible additional Solar System planet:

- An analysis of mid-infrared observations with the WISE telescope have ruled out the possibility of a Saturn-sized object (95 Earth masses) out to 10,000 AU, and a Jupiter-sized or larger object out to 26,000 AU. WISE has continued to take more data since then, and NASA has invited the public to help search this data for evidence of planets beyond these limits, via the Backyard Worlds: Planet 9 citizen science project.
- Using modern data on the anomalous precession of the perihelia of Saturn, Earth, and Mars, Lorenzo Iorio concluded that any unknown planet with a mass of 0.7 times that of Earth must be farther than 350–400 AU; one with a mass of 2 times that of Earth, farther than 496–570 AU; and finally one with a mass of 15 times that of Earth, farther than 970–1,111 AU. Moreover, Iorio stated that the modern ephemerides of the Solar System outer planets has provided even tighter constraints: no celestial body with a mass of 15 times that of Earth can exist closer than 1,100–1,300 AU. However, work by another group of astronomers using a more comprehensive model of the Solar System found that Iorio's conclusion was only partially correct. Their analysis of Cassini data on Saturn's orbital residuals found that observations were inconsistent with a planetary body with the orbit and mass similar to those of Batygin and Brown's Planet Nine having a true anomaly of −130° to −110°, or −65° to 85°. Furthermore, the analysis found that Saturn's orbit is slightly better explained if such a body is located at a true anomaly of 117.8°+11°
  −10°. At this location, it would be approximately 630 AU from the Sun.
- Using public data on the orbits of the extreme trans-Neptunian objects, it has been confirmed that a statistically significant (62σ) asymmetry between the shortest mutual ascending and descending nodal distances does exist; in addition, multiple highly improbably (p < 0.0002) correlated pairs of orbits with mutual nodal distances as low as 0.2 AU at 152 AU from the Solar System's barycentre or 1.3 AU at 339 AU have been found. Both findings suggest that massive perturbers may exist at hundreds of AUs from the Sun and are difficult to explain within the context of a uniform distribution of orbital orientations in the outermost Solar System.

== See also ==
- Fictional planets of the Solar System
- List of hypothetical Solar System objects

=== Survey telescopes ===
- Large Synoptic Survey Telescope (LSST)
- Pan-STARRS
- Wide-field Infrared Survey Explorer (WISE)

== Bibliography ==
- Croswell, Ken (1997). Planet quest: the epic discovery of alien solar systems. New York: Free Press. ISBN 978-0-684-83252-4.
- Littmann, Mark (1990). Planets beyond: discovering the outer solar system. The Wiley science editions. New York: Wiley. ISBN 978-0-471-51053-6.
- Schilling, Govert (2009). The hunt for Planet X: new worlds and the fate of Pluto. New York, NY: Copernicus Books. ISBN 978-0-387-77804-4.
- Tombaugh, Clyde W. (1946). "The Search for the Ninth Planet, Pluto". Astronomical Society of the Pacific Leaflets. 5 (209): 73–80. Bibcode:1946ASPL....5...73T.
