= Lambda Cancri =

Blue-white hued star in the constellation Cancer

λ Cancri
- Location of Piautos (circled)

Observation data Epoch J2000 Equinox J2000
- Constellation: Cancer
- Right ascension: 08^{h} 20^{m} 32.13630^{s}
- Declination: +24° 01′ 20.3198″
- Apparent magnitude (V): +5.93

Characteristics
- Evolutionary stage: main sequence
- Spectral type: B9.5 V
- B−V color index: −0.039±0.004

Astrometry
Radial velocity (R_{v})	+23.0±4.3 km/s
Proper motion (μ)	RA: −20.843 mas/yr Dec.: −18.970 mas/yr
Parallax (π)	5.7362±0.0582 mas
Distance	569 ± 6 ly (174 ± 2 pc)
Absolute magnitude (M_{V})	+0.19

Details

λ Cnc A
Mass	2.61±0.35 M_{☉}
Radius	3.69±0.13 R_{☉}
Luminosity	131±9 L_{☉}
Surface gravity (log g)	3.72±0.06 cgs
Temperature	10,162±123 K
Rotational velocity (v sin i)	188 km/s
Age	105+287 −93 Myr

λ Cnc B
Mass	0.8 M_{☉}
Temperature	4,562±154 K
Metallicity [Fe/H]	−0.5 dex
Rotational velocity (v sin i)	10 km/s

Other designations
- Piautos, λ Cnc, 19 Cancri, BD+24°1909, HD 70011, HIP 40881, HR 3268, SAO 80113

Database references
SIMBAD	data

Lambda Cancri is a blue-white-hued spectroscopic binary star in the zodiac constellation of Cancer. Its name is a Bayer designation that is Latinized from λ Cancri, and abbreviated Lambda Cnc or λ Cnc. With a combined apparent visual magnitude of +5.93, it is faintly visible to the naked eye. Based upon parallax measurements obtained during the Gaia mission, it is approximately 569 light-years (174 pc) distant from the Sun. The system is drifting further away with a line of sight velocity of around +23 km/s.

The two components are designated Lambda Cancri A (formally named Piautos /piˈɔːtɒs/) and B. The position of this system near the ecliptic means it is subject to lunar occultation.

== Nomenclature ==
λ Cancri (Latinised to Lambda Cancri) is the binary's Bayer designation. The designations of the two components as Lambda Cancri A and B derive from the convention used by the Washington Multiplicity Catalog (WMC) for multiple star systems, and adopted by the International Astronomical Union (IAU).

The system occurs in the lunar station that was given the name πιαυτος piautos in a Coptic manuscript list of lunar stations, nearly all of which were in "debased" Greek. Walter Crum was of the opinion that Piautos is formed from the Greek word autos "self" and the Coptic determiner pi- "that", which is automatically tacked onto Greek nouns. The combination would (in Greek) mean "the same, the very one". Given that the Greeks are not known to have used lunar stations, the origin of the names is unknown.

In 2016, the IAU organized a Working Group on Star Names (WGSN) to catalog and standardize proper names for stars. The WGSN approved the name Piautos for Lambda Cancri on 1 June 2018 and it is now so included in the List of IAU-approved Star Names. The WGSN had previously stated that where a component letter (from e.g. Washington Double Star Catalog) is not explicitly listed, that the name should be understood to be attributed to the brightest component by visual brightness (Lambda Cancri A in this case).

In Chinese, 爟 (Guàn), meaning Beacon Fire, refers to an asterism consisting of Lambda Cancri and Psi, Phi^{1} and 15 Cancri. Consequently, Lambda Cancri itself is known as 爟二 (Guàn èr, English: the Second Star of Beacon Fire). From this Chinese name, the name Kwan Wei meaning "the bright fire" was given.

== Properties ==
The binary nature of this system was announced by K. Gullikson and associates in 2016. The primary, Lambda Cancri A, is a B-type main-sequence star with a stellar classification of B9.5 V. This star is roughly 105 million years old and is spinning rapidly with a projected rotational velocity of 188 km/s. It has 2.6 times the mass of the Sun and 3.7 times the Sun's radius. The star radiates 131 times the Sun's luminosity from its photosphere at an effective temperature of roughly 10,162 K. Its close companion, Lambda Cancri B, has 80% of the mass of the Sun.
