= Titius =

Titius may refer to:

- 1998 Titius, a main belt asteroid
- Titius (crater), a 2.7 km-deep lunar crater
- Titius (river), the Latin name for today's Krka river in Croatia
- The nomen borne by male members of the gens Titia

== People with the surname ==
- Johann Daniel Titius (1729–1796), German astronomer
- Marcus Titius (1st century), Roman politician
