= 1732 Heike =

Main-belt asteroid

Discovery
- Discovered by: K. Reinmuth
- Discovery site: Heidelberg Obs.
- Discovery date: 9 March 1943

Designations
- Named after: Heike Neckel (granddaughter of astronomer Alfred Bohrmann)
- Alternative designations: 1943 EY · 1934 LC; 1935 TD · 1938 FC; 1938 GB · 1950 NR_{1} 1951 WW · 1960 ME; 1961 TU_{1} · 1966 QJ; 1971 QY_{1} · A906 FA; A924 PB
- Minor planet category: main-belt · Eos

Orbital characteristics
- Epoch 4 September 2017 (JD 2458000.5)
- Uncertainty parameter 0
- Observation arc: 111.22 yr (40,623 days)
- Aphelion: 3.3482 AU
- Perihelion: 2.6793 AU
- Semi-major axis: 3.0137 AU
- Eccentricity: 0.1110
- Orbital period (sidereal): 5.23 yr (1,911 days)
- Mean anomaly: 249.18°
- Mean motion: 0° 11^{m} 18.24^{s} / day
- Inclination: 10.776°
- Longitude of ascending node: 155.63°
- Argument of perihelion: 211.36°

Physical characteristics
- Dimensions: 20.50±0.79 km 22.378±0.235; 23.485±0.161 km 24.06±4.2 km 24.17 km (derived); 24.31±1.45 km
- Synodic rotation period: 3.90 h 4.742±0.013 h
- Geometric albedo: 0.1108±0.052; 0.114±0.015; 0.1169±0.0116; 0.128±0.025; 0.1320 (derived); 0.201±0.040
- Spectral type: LS · S
- Absolute magnitude (H): 10.80 · 10.82±0.19 · 10.9 · 11.1

1732 Heike, provisional designation 1943 EY, is a stony Eoan asteroid from the outer region of the asteroid belt, approximately 24 kilometers in diameter.

It was discovered on 9 March 1943, by German astronomer Karl Reinmuth at Heidelberg Observatory in southern Germany, and named after Heike Neckel, the granddaughter of astronomer Alfred Bohrmann.

== Classification and orbit ==
The S-type asteroid is a member of the Eos family. It orbits the Sun in the outer main-belt at a distance of 2.7–3.3 AU once every 5 years and 3 months (1,911 days). Its orbit has an eccentricity of 0.11 and an inclination of 11° with respect to the ecliptic. Heike was first identified as A906 FA at Heidelberg Observatory in 1906. The body's first used observation was also taken at Heidelberg in 1924, when it was identified as 1924 PB, extending the body's observation arc by 19 years prior to its official discovery observation.

== Rotation period ==
In October 2010, a rotational lightcurve of Heike was obtained from photometric observations at the Truman Observatory. It gave a well-defined rotation period of 4.742 hours with a brightness variation of 0.32 magnitude (U=3), superseding a previous period of 3.90 hours (U=2).

== Diameter and albedo ==
According to the surveys carried out by the Infrared Astronomical Satellite IRAS, the Japanese Akari satellite, and NASA's Wide-field Infrared Survey Explorer with its subsequent NEOWISE mission, the asteroid measures between 20.50 and 24.31 kilometers in diameter, and its surface has an albedo between 0.110 and 0.201. The Collaborative Asteroid Lightcurve Link derives an albedo of 0.132 and a diameter of 24.17 kilometers with an absolute magnitude of 10.9.

== Naming ==
This minor planet was named after Heike Neckel, granddaughter of German astronomer Alfred Bohrmann (1904–2000), who was a colleague of the discoverer at Heidelberg. The asteroid 1635 Bohrmann bears his name. The official naming citation was published by the Minor Planet Center on 20 February 1976 (M.P.C. 3933).
