= Kovalʹskiy (crater) =

Crater on the Moon

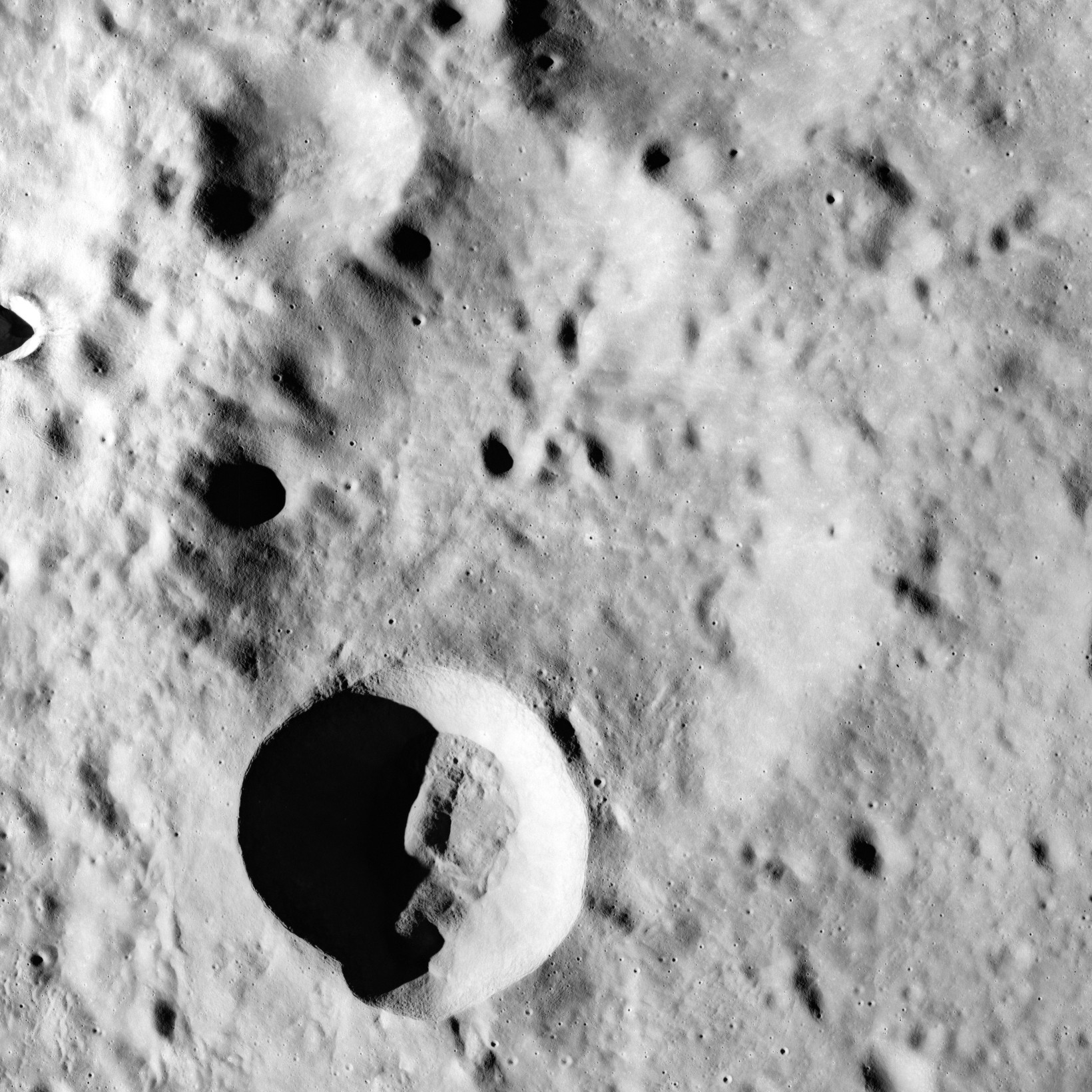
- Apollo 15 image
- Coordinates: 21.9°S 101.0°E
- Diameter: 49 km
- Depth: Unknown
- Colongitude: 259° at sunrise
- Eponym: Marian A. Kowalski

Kovalʹskiy is a crater on the far side of the Moon. It lies about one crater diameter to the southeast of the prominent Sklodowska, and to the north-northwest of Bowditch and Lacus Solitudinis, a small lunar mare.

This feature has been heavily damaged by overlapping impacts, leaving it scarcely distinguishable from the irregular lunar terrain. The satellite crater Kovalʹskiy P lies across the southwestern rim, and Kovalʹskiy B intrudes into the northeastern rim. A small crater also lies across the northwestern rim. The interior is irregular and marked by several small craterlets.

Kovalʹskiy K lies at the midpoint of a high-albedo patch. A single faint ray extends to the southeast directly across Kovalʹsky.

== Satellite craters ==
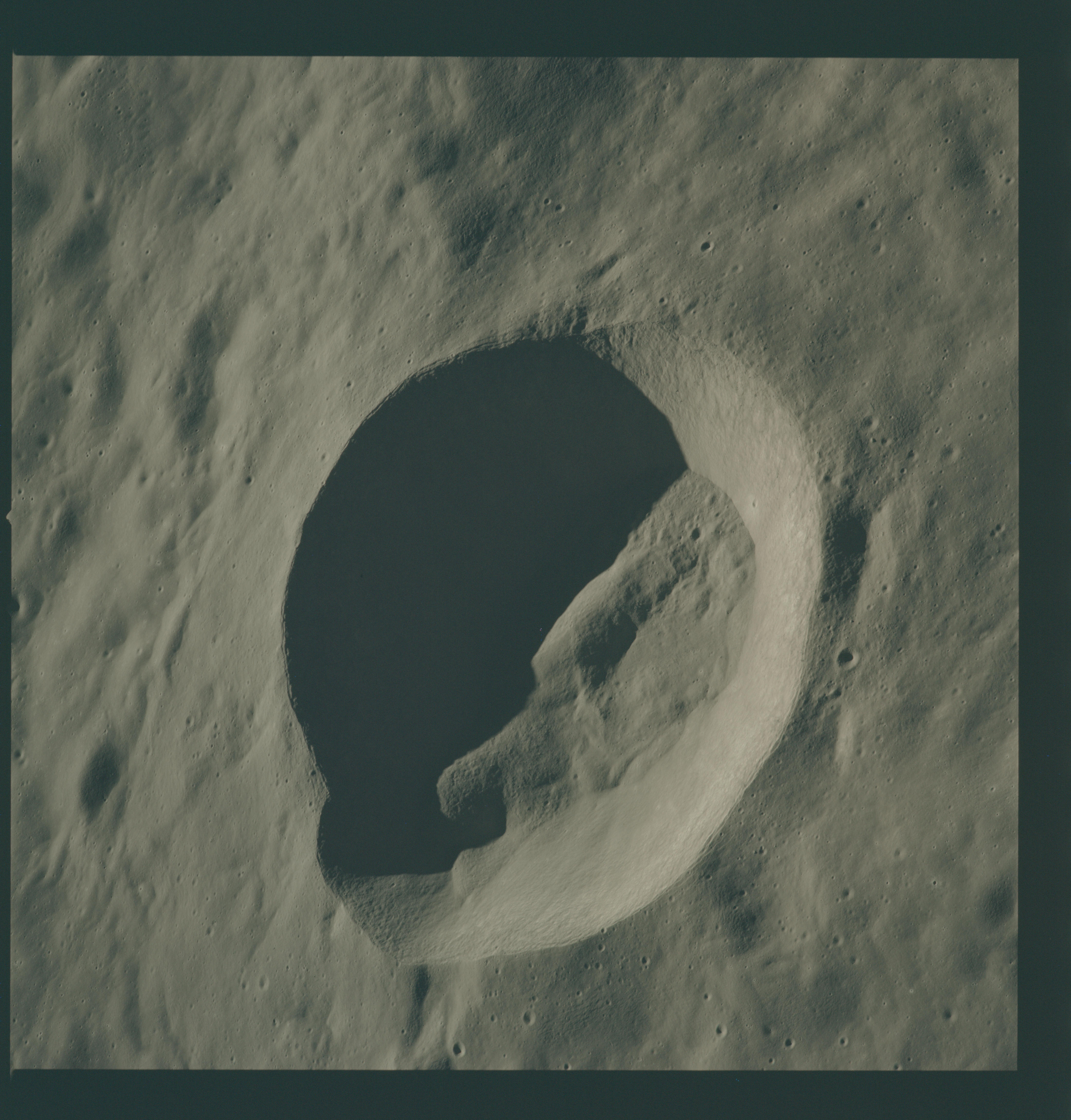
Kovalʹskiy P crater, from Apollo 15

By convention these features are identified on lunar maps by placing the letter on the side of the crater midpoint that is closest to Kovalʹskiy.

Kovalʹskiy	Latitude	Longitude	Diameter
B	20.8° S	101.5° E	28 km
D	20.9° S	103.0° E	19 km
H	22.5° S	102.6° E	37 km
M	23.8° S	100.8° E	18 km
P	22.4° S	100.3° E	25 km
Q	23.5° S	98.7° E	35 km
U	21.1° S	98.1° E	25 km
Y	20.8° S	100.5° E	19 km

Kovalʹskiy P dates to the Eratosthenian period and has a meteoritic iron-rich impact melt.
