= Phi Cancri =

The Bayer designation Phi Cancri (φ Cnc / φ Cancri) is shared by a star and star system, in the constellation Cancer:

- φ^{1} Cancri
- φ^{2} Cancri

They are separated by 0.96° on the sky.
