= Psi Cancri =

The Bayer designation Psi Cancri (ψ Cnc, ψ Cancri) is shared by two star systems, separated by 0.34° on the sky, in the constellation Cancer:

- ψ¹ Cancri
- ψ² Cancri, which is often referred to solely as ψ Cancri

Johann Bode designated the star 15 Cancri as ψ^{3} Cancri, despite the distance from the other two. It was given the designation due to Johann Bayer’s original Uranometria designating it as ψ Geminorum.
