= 14 Cancri =

Star in the constellation Cancer

Observation data Epoch J2000.0 Equinox J2000.0 (ICRS)
- Constellation: Cancer
- Right ascension: 08^{h} 10^{m} 27.181^{s}
- Declination: +25° 30′ 26.40″
- Apparent magnitude (V): +5.73

Characteristics
- Evolutionary stage: Subgiant
- Spectral type: G7 V
- U−B color index: +0.43
- B−V color index: +0.81

Astrometry
Radial velocity (R_{v})	−44.48±0.09 km/s
Proper motion (μ)	RA: −72.954 mas/yr Dec.: −347.888 mas/yr
Parallax (π)	24.8472±0.0508 mas
Distance	131.3 ± 0.3 ly (40.25 ± 0.08 pc)
Absolute magnitude (M_{V})	+2.65

Details
Mass	1.49±0.04 M_{☉}
Radius	3.20±0.11 R_{☉}
Luminosity	8±1 L_{☉}
Surface gravity (log g)	3.87±0.08 cgs
Temperature	5,311±23 K
Metallicity [Fe/H]	−0.12±0.06 dex
Rotational velocity (v sin i)	0.98±0.42 km/s
Age	2.39±0.14 Gyr

Other designations
- ψ^{2} Cnc, 14 Cnc, BD+25°1865, FK5 2633, GC 11091, HD 67767, HIP 40023, HR 3191, SAO 79995, CCDM 08104+2530

Database references
SIMBAD	data

14 Cancri is a star in the northern zodiac constellation of Cancer. It can be referred to as ψ Cancri, very occasionally as its Bayer designation of ψ^{2} Cancri, to distinguish it from 13 Cancri, which is sometimes called ψ^{1} Cancri. This star is just barely visible to the naked eye, having an apparent visual magnitude of +5.73. Based upon an annual parallax shift of 24.85 mas as seen from Earth, it is located 131 light-years (40 pc) distant. It is drifting closer to the Sun with a line of sight velocity of −44 km/s, and may be a member of the Wolf 630 moving group of stars.

This object has a stellar classification of G7 V, which presents as a G-type main-sequence star. However, it is actually a more evolved subgiant star as indicated by a surface gravity of log g = 3.87 and its position in the H-R diagram. As such, it has an estimated 1.5 times the mass of the Sun and 3.2 times the Sun's radius. The star is 2.4 billion years old with what appears to be a leisurely rotation rate, judging by a projected rotational velocity of 0.98 km/s. It is radiating eight times the Sun's luminosity from its photosphere at an effective temperature of 5,311 K.
