= Perelman (disambiguation) =

Perelman is a surname.

Perelman may also refer to:

- Perelman School of Medicine at the University of Pennsylvania
- 50033 Perelman, asteroid named after Grigori Perelman
- Perel'man (crater), lunar crater named after Yakov Perelman
