= Scaliger (disambiguation) =

- The noble family of the Scaliger, or Scaligeri, were Lords of Verona from the 13th to early 15th century.
- Scaliger (crater)
- Scaliger Tombs

Scaliger may also refer to persons dubiously claiming to be of the noble Verona Scaliger family:

- Julius Caesar Scaliger (1484–1558), Italian scholar and physician
- Joseph Justus Scaliger (1540–1609), French-Dutch classicist, son of the preceding
