= Prosperin =

Prosperin may refer to:

- 7292 Prosperin, an asteroid named after astronomer Erik Prosperin
- Erik Prosperin (1739–1803), a Swedish astronomer
