= Perelʹman (crater) =

Crater on the Moon

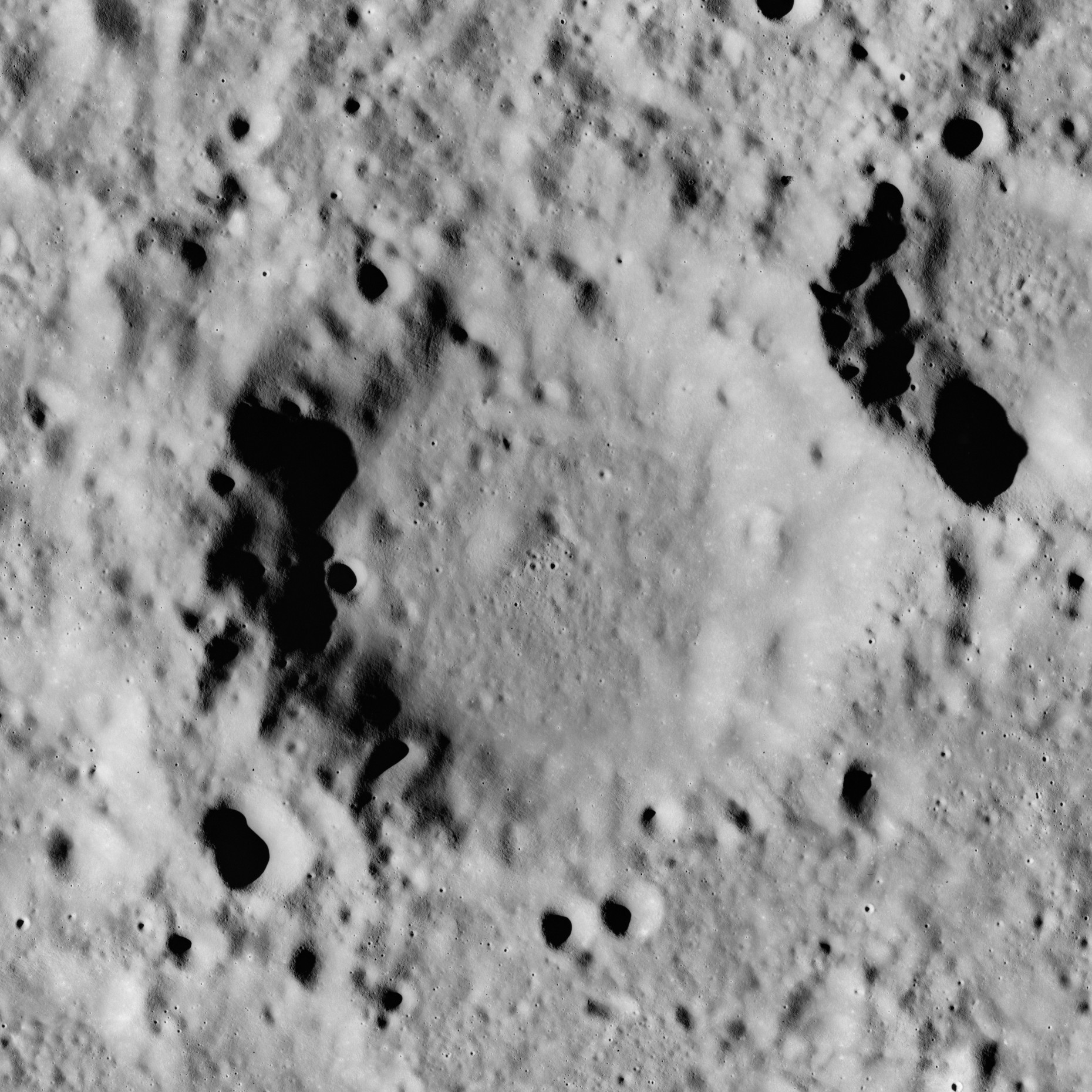
- Apollo 15 image
- Coordinates: 24.0°S 106.0°E
- Diameter: 46 km
- Depth: Unknown
- Colongitude: 255° at sunrise
- Eponym: Yakov I. Perelman

Perelʹman is a worn impact crater that lies on the Moon's far side. It is located less than one crater diameter to the northwest of the prominent crater Scaliger. To the west-southwest is the elongated Bowditch. Southwest of Perelʹman is a small lunar mare that has been named Lacus Solitudinis.

This crater is generally unremarkable. It is worn and eroded with an uneven outer rim. The satellite crater Perelʹman E is attached to the eastern exterior. The crater is free of significant overlapping impacts. There is a low ridge near the midpoint of the interior floor.

== Satellite craters ==
By convention these features are identified on lunar maps by placing the letter on the side of the crater midpoint that is closest to Perelʹman.

Perelʹman	Latitude	Longitude	Diameter
E	23.9° S	107.2° E	28 km
S	24.3° S	104.4° E	26 km
