= 2016 Heinemann =

Themistian asteroid

Discovery
- Discovered by: A. Bohrmann
- Discovery site: Heidelberg Obs.
- Discovery date: 18 September 1938

Designations
- Named after: Karl Heinemann (1898–1970) (German astronomer)
- Alternative designations: 1938 SE · 1927 SM; 1930 DF · 1949 SB_{1} 1971 OB_{1} · 1971 QP_{2} 1972 VY · 1977 RZ_{7} A905 UF
- Minor planet category: main-belt · Themis

Orbital characteristics
- Epoch 4 September 2017 (JD 2458000.5)
- Uncertainty parameter 0
- Observation arc: 111.34 yr (40,667 days)
- Aphelion: 3.7291 AU
- Perihelion: 2.5295 AU
- Semi-major axis: 3.1293 AU
- Eccentricity: 0.1917
- Orbital period (sidereal): 5.54 yr (2,022 days)
- Mean anomaly: 72.570°
- Mean motion: 0° 10^{m} 40.8^{s} / day
- Inclination: 0.9191°
- Longitude of ascending node: 16.986°
- Argument of perihelion: 340.99°

Physical characteristics
- Dimensions: 21.68 km (derived); 22.435±0.142 km 22.718±0.080 km 24.18±0.23 km 25.52±1.41 km
- Synodic rotation period: 22.96±0.01 h
- Geometric albedo: 0.058±0.010; 0.0653 (derived); 0.075±0.009; 0.0944±0.0179
- Spectral type: C
- Absolute magnitude (H): 11.4 · 11.80 · 11.9 · 12.01±0.33

2016 Heinemann, provisional designation 1938 SE, is a carbonaceous Themistian asteroid from the outer regions of the asteroid belt, approximately 22 kilometers in diameter. It was discovered on 18 September 1938, by German astronomer Alfred Bohrmann at Heidelberg Observatory in southwest Germany, and later named after ARI-astronomer Karl Heinemann (1898–1970).

== Orbit and classification ==
Heinemann is a member of the Themis family, a dynamical family of carbonaceous asteroids with nearly coplanar ecliptical orbits, located in the outer-belt main. It orbits the Sun at a distance of 2.5–3.7 AU once every 5 years and 6 months (2,022 days). Its orbit has an eccentricity of 0.19 and an inclination of 1° with respect to the ecliptic.

The body's observation arc begins 33 year prior to its official discovery observation, with its first identification as A905 UF at Heidelberg in October 1905.

== Physical characteristics ==
=== Rotation period ===
In October 2016, a rotational lightcurve of Heinemann was obtained from photometric observations by French astronomer Matthieu Conjat. Lightcurve analysis gave a rotation period of 22.96 hours with a brightness variation of 0.36 magnitude (U=2+).

=== Diameter and albedo ===
According to the surveys carried out by the Japanese Akari satellite and NASA's Wide-field Infrared Survey Explorer with its subsequent NEOWISE mission, Heinemann measures between 22.435 and 25.52 kilometers in diameter and its surface has an albedo between 0.058 and 0.0944.

The Collaborative Asteroid Lightcurve Link derives an albedo of 0.0653 and a diameter of 21.68 kilometers based on an absolute magnitude of 11.9.

== Naming ==
This minor planet was named after Karl Heinemann (1898–1970), German astronomer and long-time staff member at the Astronomisches Rechen-Institut. His activities included spherical astronomy and the editing of the "Astronomischer Jahresbericht" during 1934–1958.

The official naming citation was published by the Minor Planet Center on 15 October 1977 (M.P.C. 4238).
