= Johann Elert Bode =

German astronomer (1747–1826)

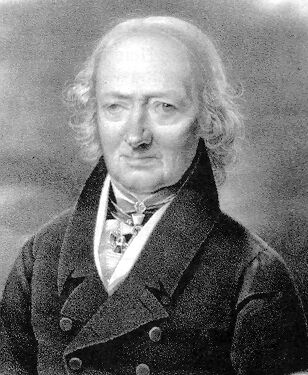
- Bode c. 1800
- Born: 19 January 1747; Hamburg, Holy Roman Empire
- Died: 23 November 1826 (aged 79); Berlin, Province of Brandenburg, Kingdom of Prussia
- Known for: Titius–Bode law
- Scientific career
- Fields: Astronomy
- Doctoral advisor: Johann Georg Büsch
- Doctoral students: Johann Pfaff

Johann Elert Bode (German: [ˈboːdə]; 19 January 1747 – 23 November 1826) was a German astronomer known for his reformulation and popularisation of the Titius–Bode law. Bode determined the orbit of Uranus and suggested the planet's name.

== Life and career ==
Bode was born in Hamburg. As a youth, he suffered from a serious eye disease that particularly damaged his right eye; he continued to have trouble with his eyes throughout his life.

His early promise in mathematics brought him to the attention of Johann Georg Büsch, who allowed Bode to use his own library for study. He began his career with the publication of a short work on the solar eclipse of 5 August 1766. This was followed by an elementary treatise on astronomy entitled Anleitung zur Kenntniss des gestirnten Himmels (1768, 10th ed. 1844), the success of which led to his being invited to Berlin by Johann Heinrich Lambert in 1772 for the purpose of computing ephemerides on an improved plan. There in 1774, he founded the Astronomisches Jahrbuch. He later compiled and issued 51 yearly volumes of it.

He became director of the Berlin Observatory in 1786, from which he retired in 1825. There he published the Uranographia in 1801, a celestial atlas that aimed both at scientific accuracy in showing the positions of stars and other astronomical objects, as well as the artistic interpretation of the stellar constellation figures. The Uranographia marks the climax of an epoch of artistic representation of the constellations. Later atlases showed fewer and fewer elaborate figures until they were no longer printed on such tables.

Bode also published another small star atlas, intended for astronomical amateurs (Vorstellung der Gestirne). He is credited with the discovery of Bode's Galaxy (M81). Comet Bode (C/1779 A1) is named after him; its orbit was calculated by Erik Prosperin. Asteroid 998 Bodea, discovered on 6 August 1923 by Karl Reinmuth at Heidelberg, was also christened in his honour, the letter 'a' added to its name to fulfil the convention that asteroids were given feminine names.

His name became attached to the 'law' discovered by Johann Daniel Titius in 1766. Bode first makes mention of it in the Anleitung zur Kenntniss des gestirnten Himmels in a footnote, and although it is often officially called the Titius–Bode law, it is also commonly just called Bode's law. This law attempts to explain the distances of the planets from the Sun in a formula although ironically it breaks down for the planet Neptune which was later discovered in Berlin. It was the discovery of Uranus at a position predicted by the law which aroused great interest in it. There was a gap (with no planet) between Mars and Jupiter, and Bode urged a search for a planet in this region which culminated in a group formed for this purpose, the so-called "celestial police". However before the group initiated a search, they were trumped by the discovery of the asteroid Ceres by Giuseppe Piazzi from Palermo in 1801, at Bode's predicted position.

Latterly, the law fell out of favour when it was realised that Ceres was only one of a small number of asteroids and when Neptune was found not to be in a position required by the law. The discovery of planets around other stars has brought the law back into discussion.

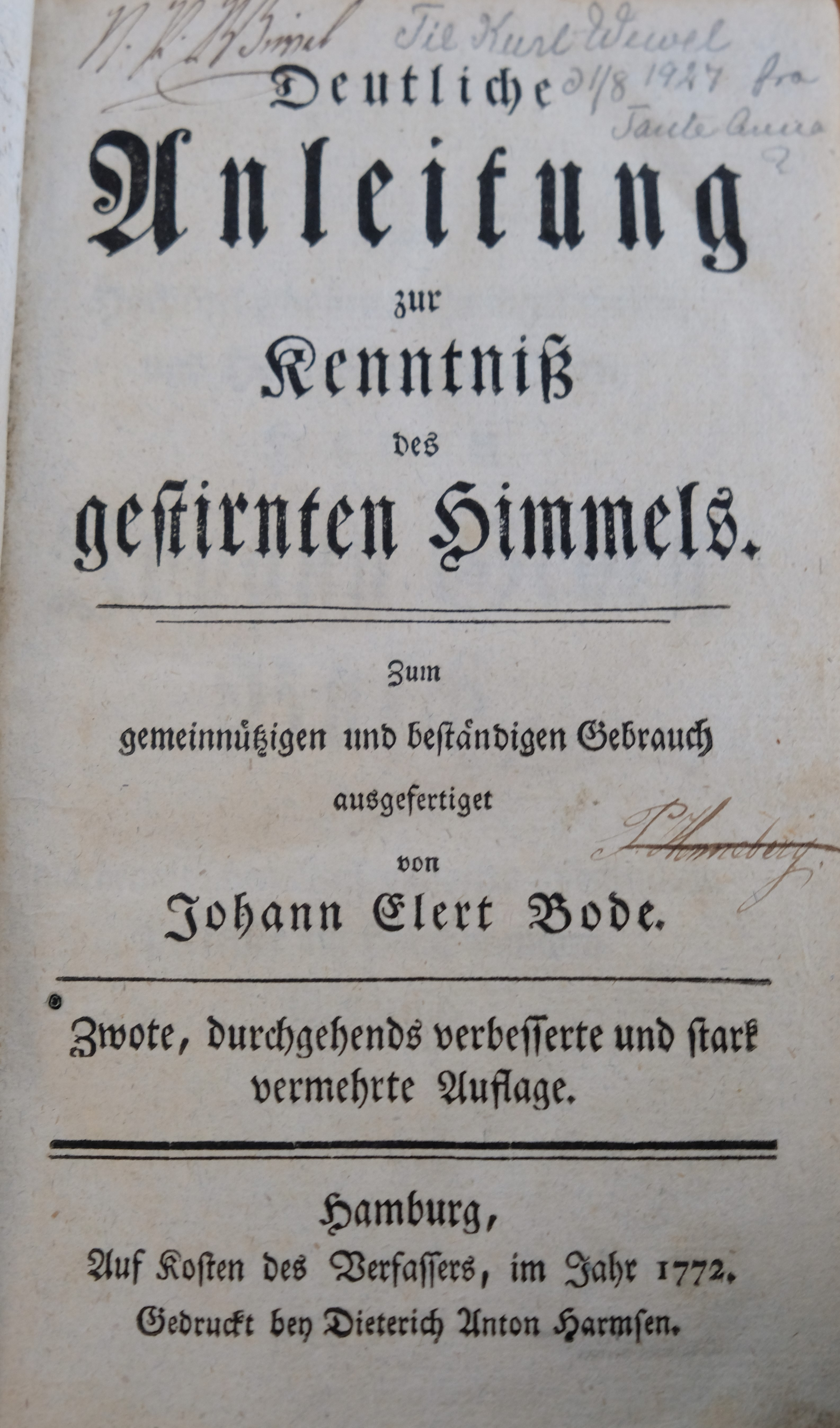
Front page of a 1772 edition of Anleitung zur Kenntniss des gestirnten Himmels

Bode himself was directly involved in research leading from the discovery of a planet – that of Uranus in 1781. Although Uranus was the first planet to be discovered by telescope, it is just about visible with the naked eye. Bode consulted older star charts and found numerous examples of the planet's position being given while being mistaken for a star, for example, John Flamsteed, Astronomer Royal in Britain, had listed it in his catalogue of 1690 as a star with the name 34 Tauri. These earlier sightings allowed an exact calculation of the orbit of the new planet.

Bode was also responsible for giving the new planet its name. The discoverer William Herschel proposed to name it after George III which was not accepted so readily in other countries. Bode opted for Uranus, with the apparent logic that just as Saturn was the father of Jupiter, the new planet should be named after the father of Saturn. There were further alternatives proposed, but ultimately Bode's suggestion became the most widely used – however it had to wait until 1850 before gaining official acceptance in Britain when the Nautical Almanac Office switched from using the name Georgium Sidus to Uranus. In 1789, Bode's Royal Academy colleague Martin Klaproth was inspired by Bode's name for the planet to name his newly discovered element "uranit", then changed to "uranium" in order to conform with the names of other metals.

From 1787 to 1825 Bode was director of the Astronomisches Rechen-Institut. In 1794, he was elected a foreign member of the Royal Swedish Academy of Sciences. In April 1789 he was elected a fellow of the Royal Society.

Bode died in Berlin on 23 November 1826, aged 79.

== Selected writings ==
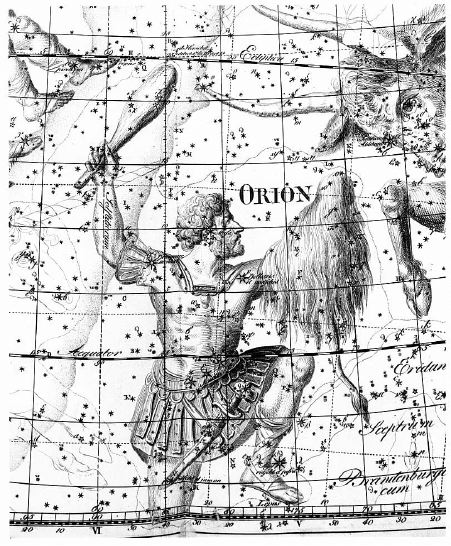
Section of a plate from Uranographia showing the constellation Orion

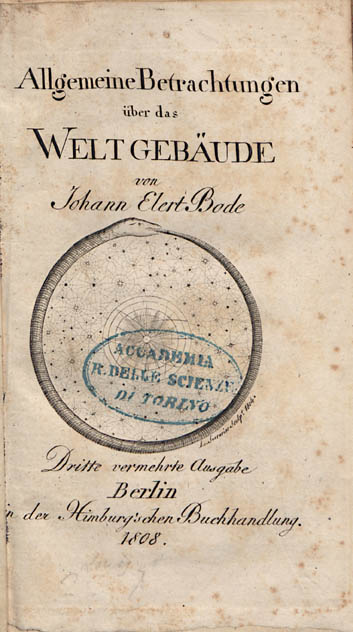
Allgemeine Betrachtungen über das Weltgebäude, 1808

- 1768 (10th ed. 1844) Anleitung zur Kentniss des Gestirnten Himmels (The most famous of Bode's writings. In this work, he first announced Bode's law.)
- 1774–1957 Berliner Astronomisches Jahrbuch für 1776–1959 (The astronomical yearbook published by Berlin Observatory.)
- 1776 Sammlung astronomischer Tafeln (3 vols.)
- 1776 (3rd ed. 1808) Erläuterung der Sternkunde, an introductory book on the constellations and their tales, which was reprinted more than ten times
- 1782 Vorstellung der Gestirne ... des Flamsteadschen Himmelsatlas (Bode's revised and enlarged edition of Fortin's small star atlas of Flamsteed.)

Verzeichniss (Containing the above star atlas, and including 5,058 stars observed by Flamsteed, Hevelius, T. Mayer, de la Caille, Messier, le Monnier, Darquier and Bode himself.)

- 1801 Uranographia sive Astrorum Descriptio (A large star atlas illustrated with twenty copper plates.)

Allgemeine Beschreibung und Nachweisung der Gestirne (A star catalogue listing 17,240 stars.)

- Allgemeine Betrachtungen über das Weltgebäude (in German). Berlin: Himburg. 1808.

His works were highly effective in diffusing throughout Germany a taste for astronomy.

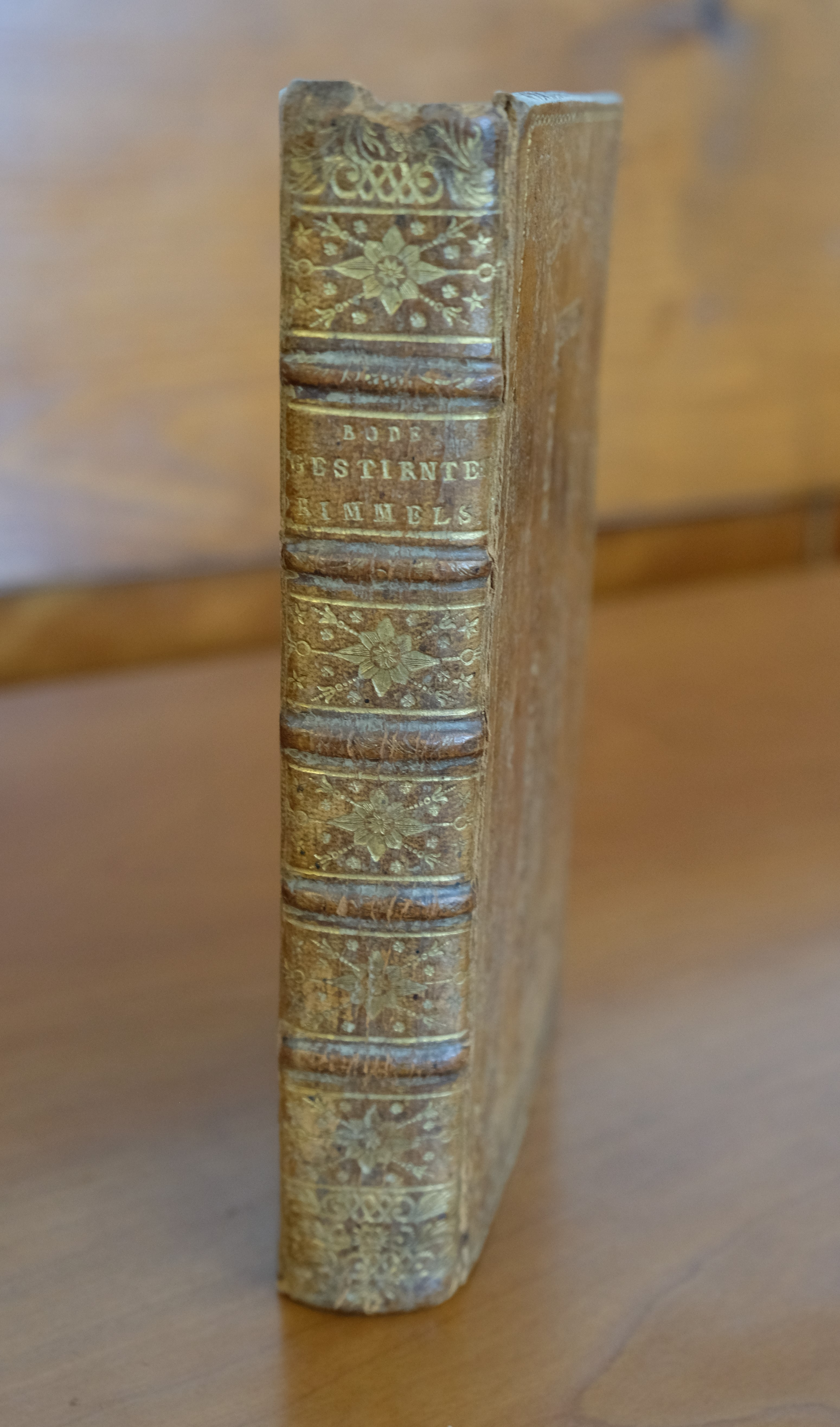
1772 copy of Anleitung zur Kenntniss des gestirnten Himmels

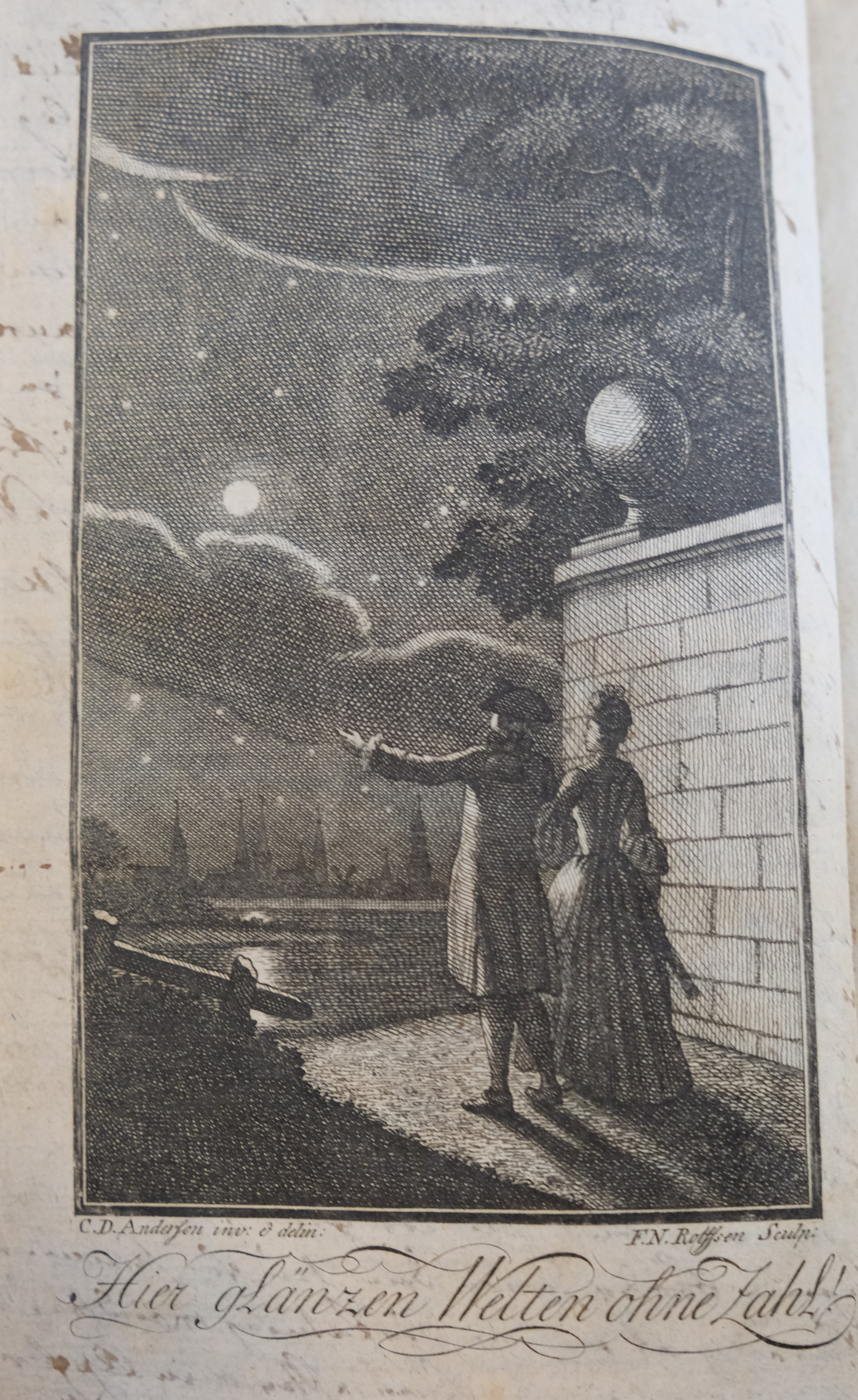
Front page illustration from 1772 copy of Anleitung zur kenntniss
