= Marian Albertovich Kowalski =

Polish-Russian astronomer

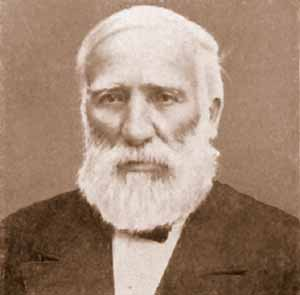
Marian Albertovich Kowalski

Marian Albertovich Kowalski (Note: Sometimes transliterated as Kovalsky, Kovalʼsky, or Kovalʼskiy. In the scientific literature, his name was given as either Kowalski or Kowalsky.) (Russian: Мариан Альбертович Ковальский; 15 August 1821 or 15 October 1821 – 28 May 1884 or 9 July 1884) was a Polish-Russian astronomer.

== Biography ==
He was born in Dobrzyń nad Wisłą (called Добжинь in Russian) in Congress Poland, Russian Empire. His patronymic is alternatively given as Voytekhovich or Voytsekhovich (Войтехович or Войцехович), which suggests his father's name was Wojciech. Confusingly, a few Russian sources even give his name as Marian Albertovich Kovalsky-Voytekhovich, but this seems to be an error.

He graduated from St. Petersburg University in 1845. His PhD was in 1852 for his theory of the orbit of Neptune. Beginning in 1852 he was director of the Kazan Observatory, and dean of faculty of physics and mathematics in Kazan.

His most important work was on the analysis of the proper motion of 3,136 stars from James Bradley's catalog, which was the first usable method to deduce the rotation of the Milky Way galaxy. Based on this work, he disproved that a single massive central body in the center of our galaxy was responsible for the motion of the stars.

In celestial mechanics, he found improved methods to deduce a planetary orbit from observations, and analysed the mathematics of perturbations in planetary motions. In particular, he made a more accurate determination of Neptune's orbit. He also found an improved method of determining the orbits of binary stars.

His important papers were published in 1859 in the book Recherches astronomiques de l'observatoire de Kasan.

He died in Kazan and is buried in the Catholic cemetery there. He was the father of Aleksandr Marianovich Kowalski, who worked at Pulkovo Observatory and who died on July 6, 1902, at the age of 44.

== Legacy ==
The crater Koval'skiy on the Moon and the crater Koval'sky on Mars are both named in his honour.
