= 1998 Titius =

Metallic-carbonaceous main-belt asteroid

Discovery
- Discovered by: A. Bohrmann
- Discovery site: Heidelberg Obs.
- Discovery date: 24 February 1938

Designations
- Named after: Johann Titius (astronomer)
- Alternative designations: 1938 DX_{1} · 1966 TF
- Minor planet category: main-belt · (inner)

Orbital characteristics
- Epoch 4 September 2017 (JD 2458000.5)
- Uncertainty parameter 0
- Observation arc: 79.27 yr (28,955 days)
- Aphelion: 2.5750 AU
- Perihelion: 2.2643 AU
- Semi-major axis: 2.4196 AU
- Eccentricity: 0.0642
- Orbital period (sidereal): 3.76 yr (1,375 days)
- Mean anomaly: 335.11°
- Mean motion: 0° 15^{m} 42.84^{s} / day
- Inclination: 7.6265°
- Longitude of ascending node: 351.78°
- Argument of perihelion: 246.70°

Physical characteristics
- Dimensions: 10.79 km (calculated); 14.24±0.17 km 14.782±0.081 km 15.98±0.35 km
- Synodic rotation period: 6.13±0.01 h
- Geometric albedo: 0.093±0.004; 0.1066±0.0037; 0.126±0.031; 0.20 (assumed)
- Spectral type: SMASS = Xc; M · C · X
- Absolute magnitude (H): 12.10 · 12.15±0.22 · 12.2

1998 Titius, provisional designation 1938 DX_{1}, is a metallic–carbonaceous asteroid from the inner regions of the asteroid belt, approximately 14 kilometers in diameter.

It was discovered on 24 February 1938, by German astronomer Alfred Bohrmann at Heidelberg Observatory in southern Germany. On the same night, the body was also observed at the Finnish Turku Observatory. It was later named after astronomer Johann Daniel Titius.

== Orbit and classification ==
Titius orbits the Sun in the inner main-belt at a distance of 2.3–2.6 AU once every 3 years and 9 months (1,375 days). Its orbit has an eccentricity of 0.06 and an inclination of 8° with respect to the ecliptic. It stays in a 2:1 orbital resonance with the planet Mars. Titius's observation arc starts on the night following its official discovery observation.

== Physical characteristics ==
=== Diameter and albedo ===
According to observations carried out by the Japanese Akari and NASA's Wide-field Infrared Survey Explorer (WISE) with its subsequent NEOWISE mission, Titius has an albedo between 0.093 and 0.126, and its diameter measures between 14.2 and 16.0 kilometers. The Collaborative Asteroid Lightcurve Link assumes a standard albedo of 0.20 and calculates a diameter of 10.8 kilometers with an absolute magnitude of 12.2.

=== Spectral type ===
Its spectral classification is that of a Xc-type asteroid in the SMASS taxonomy, a transitional spectral type between the two large main groups of metallic X-type and carbonaceous C-type asteroids. Both types are much darker than the stony S-type asteroids, which are also very common in the inner main-belt. In addition, Titius is also classified as a M-type asteroid by WISE.

=== Rotation period ===
A rotational lightcurve of Titius was obtained from photometric observations by American astronomer Robert Stephens at the Californian Santana Observatory in March 2002. Lightcurve analysis gave a rotation period of 6.13±0.01 hours, during which its brightness amplitude varies by 0.30±0.04 magnitude (U=3).

== Naming ==
This minor planet was named after German astronomer Johann Daniel Titius (1729–1796), best known for formulating the Titius-Bode law, which states that each subsequent planet in the Solar System is roughly twice as far from the Sun than the previous one. He is also honored by the lunar crater Titius. The official naming citation was published by the Minor Planet Center on 15 October 1977 (M.P.C. 4237).
