= 1470 Carla =

Main-belt asteroid

Discovery
- Discovered by: A. Bohrmann
- Discovery site: Heidelberg Obs.
- Discovery date: 17 September 1938

Designations
- Named after: Carla Ziegler (discoverer's friend)
- Alternative designations: 1938 SD · 1930 DE; 1955 UN
- Minor planet category: main-belt · (outer)

Orbital characteristics
- Epoch 16 February 2017 (JD 2457800.5)
- Uncertainty parameter 0
- Observation arc: 78.15 yr (28,546 days)
- Aphelion: 3.3771 AU
- Perihelion: 2.9416 AU
- Semi-major axis: 3.1594 AU
- Eccentricity: 0.0689
- Orbital period (sidereal): 5.62 yr (2,051 days)
- Mean anomaly: 1.2909°
- Mean motion: 0° 10^{m} 31.8^{s} / day
- Inclination: 3.2126°
- Longitude of ascending node: 358.43°
- Argument of perihelion: 341.84°

Physical characteristics
- Dimensions: 31.66±10.19 km 34.092±5.538 km 34.28±0.84 km 36.94 km (derived); 36.97±1.1 km (IRAS:22)
- Synodic rotation period: 6.15±0.040 h 6.1514±0.0002 h 6.154±0.0028 h
- Geometric albedo: 0.0470 (derived); 0.0515±0.003 (IRAS:22); 0.06±0.09; 0.0605±0.0181; 0.062±0.003
- Spectral type: C
- Absolute magnitude (H): 10.800±0.120 (R) · 10.947±0.001 (R) · 11.0 · 11.1 · 11.18 · 11.43±0.35

1470 Carla, provisional designation 1938 SD, is a carbonaceous asteroid from the outer regions of the asteroid belt, approximately 35 kilometers in diameter.

It was discovered on 17 September 1938, by German astronomer Alfred Bohrmann at Heidelberg Observatory in southwest Germany. It was named after a friend of the discoverer's family, Carla Ziegler.

== Description ==
Carla orbits the Sun at a distance of 2.9–3.4 AU once every 5 years and 7 months (2,051 days). Its orbit has an eccentricity of 0.07 and an inclination of 3° with respect to the ecliptic. It was first identified as 1930 DE at Heidelberg 1930. The body's observation arc, however, begins the night prior to its official discovery observation in 1938.

== Physical characteristics ==
=== Rotation period ===
In September 2011, a rotational lightcurve of Carla was obtained from photometric observations by astronomer Frederick Pilcher at Organ Mesa Observatory (G50) near Las Cruces, New Mexico. Lightcurve analysis gave a rotation period of 6.1514 hours with a brightness amplitude of 0.25 magnitude (U=3). in 2014, two additional lightcurves in the R-band, obtained at the Palomar Transient Factory, California, gave a period of 6.15 and 6.154 hours with an amplitude of 0.24 and 0.25, respectively (U=2/2).

=== Diameter and albedo ===
According to the surveys carried out by the Infrared Astronomical Satellite IRAS, the Japanese Akari satellite, and NASA's Wide-field Infrared Survey Explorer with its subsequent NEOWISE mission, Carla measures between 31.66 and 36.97 kilometers in diameter and its surface has an albedo of 0.051 and 0.062. The Collaborative Asteroid Lightcurve Link classifies the body as a carbonaceous C-type asteroid, derives an albedo of 0.047 with a diameter of 36.94 kilometers and an absolute magnitude of 11.1.

== Naming ==
This minor planet was named in honor of Carla Ziegler, a friend of the Bohrmann family at Heidelberg. The official naming citation was published by the Minor Planet Center in October 1954 (M.P.C. 1129).
