= Alfred Bohrmann =

German astronomer

- Born: 28 February 1904
- Died: 4 January 2000 (aged 95)
- Citizenship: Germany
- Education: University of Heidelberg
- Known for: Asteroid discovery
- Scientific career
- Fields: Astronomy
- Workplaces: University of Heidelberg

Alfred Bohrmann (28 February 1904 – 4 January 2000) was a German astronomer and discoverer of minor planets.

He did his Ph.D. dissertation in 1927 at the Heidelberg-Königstuhl State Observatory, at the University of Heidelberg. At the time, the observatory at Heidelberg was a center for asteroid discovery by Max Wolf and Karl Reinmuth and others, and during his time there Bohrmann discovered 9 asteroids. Bohrmann worked there from 1924 to 1969, publishing more than 700 minor planet observations. He left the observatory after a dispute with the higher authority.

The asteroid 1635 Bohrmann is named after him.

Minor planets discovered: 9
1455 Mitchella	5 June 1937
1470 Carla	17 September 1938
1531 Hartmut	17 September 1938
1733 Silke	19 February 1938
1998 Titius	24 February 1938
2016 Heinemann	18 September 1938
2226 Cunitza	26 August 1936
2350 von Lüde	6 February 1938
2665 Schrutka	24 February 1938
