= Titius (crater) =

Crater on the Moon

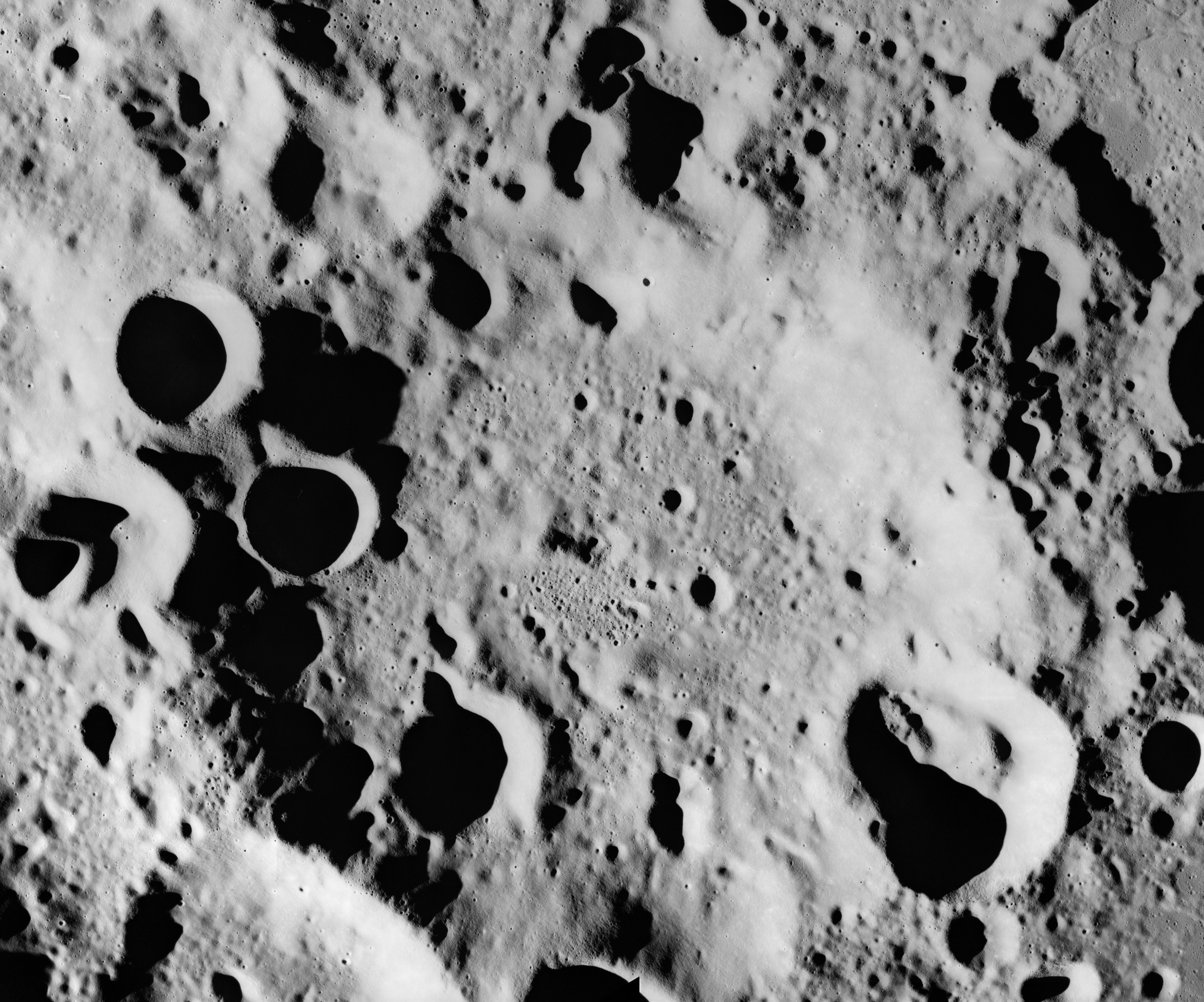
- Apollo 15 image
- Coordinates: 26.8°S 100.7°E
- Diameter: 73 km
- Depth: 2.7 km
- Colongitude: 260° at sunrise
- Eponym: Johann D. Titius

Titius is a lunar impact crater that is located on the Moon's far side, beyond the eastern limb. It lies to the west of the Lacus Solitudinis, a small lunar mare. Less than a crater diameter to the north east is the crater Bowditch, and farther to the southwest is Donner.

The rim of this crater has been nearly ruined by subsequent impacts, leaving only the northern and northeast parts relatively intact. There is a breach in the rim to the south, with the southeast overlain by Titius J and the southwest by Titius N and Titius Q, leaving only a short length of shallow, surviving rim to the south-southwest. The western rim is disrupted by three other small craters. The interior floor has some irregularities, but is relatively featureless and level to the northeast.

== Satellite craters ==
By convention these features are identified on lunar maps by placing the letter on the side of the crater midpoint that is closest to Titius.

Titius	Latitude	Longitude	Diameter
J	27.6° S	101.6° E	24 km
N	28.1° S	100.0° E	20 km
Q	28.0° S	98.6° E	46 km
R	27.1° S	99.9° E	14 km

== See also ==
- 1998 Titius, main-belt asteroid
