= Scaliger (crater) =

Crater on the Moon

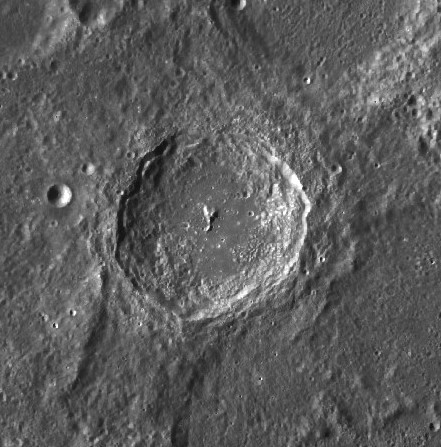
- LRO WAC image. Scaliger U is the circular crater at left.
- Coordinates: 27.1°S 108.9°E
- Diameter: 84 km
- Depth: Unknown
- Colongitude: 252° at sunrise
- Eponym: Joseph J. Scaliger

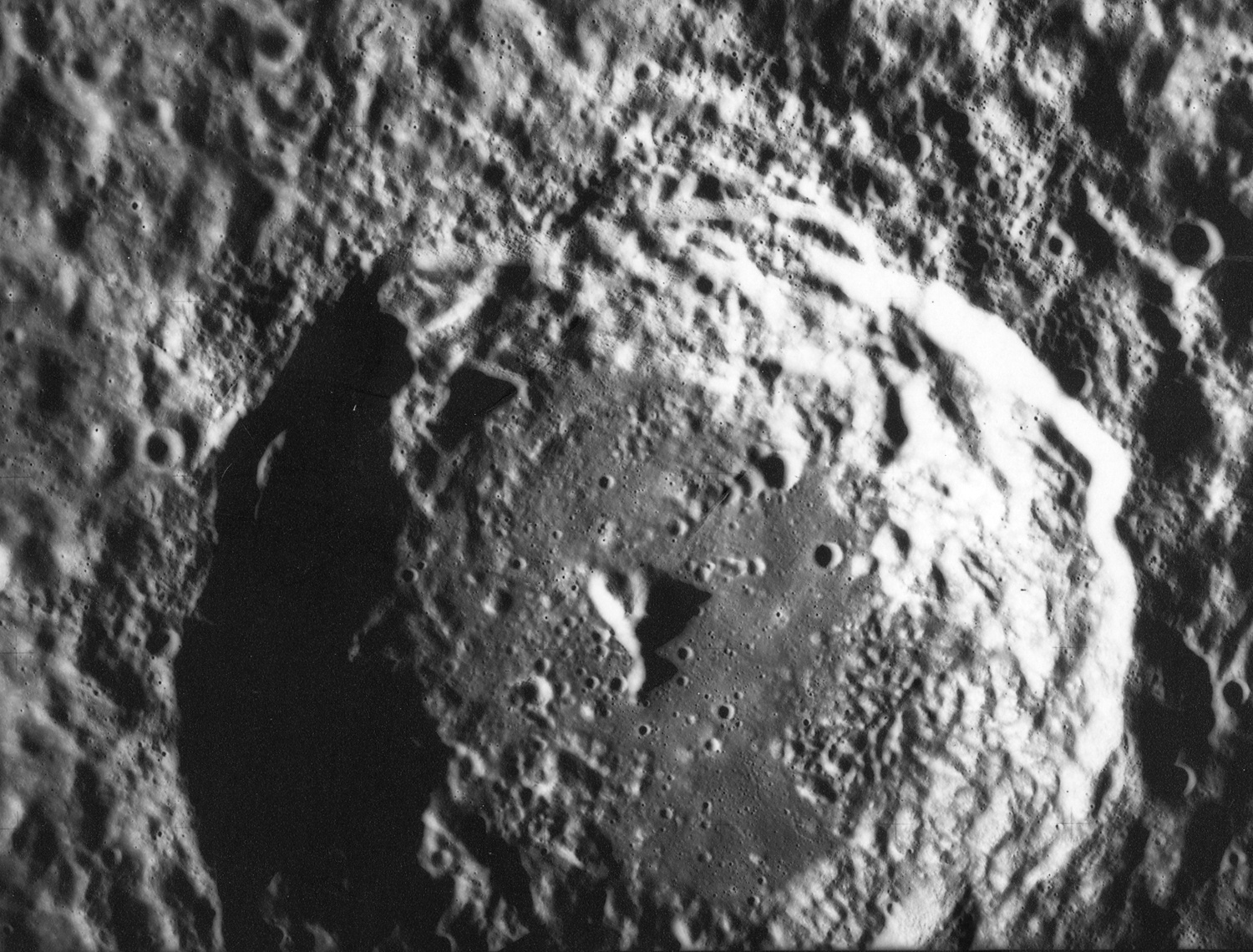
Apollo 15 image

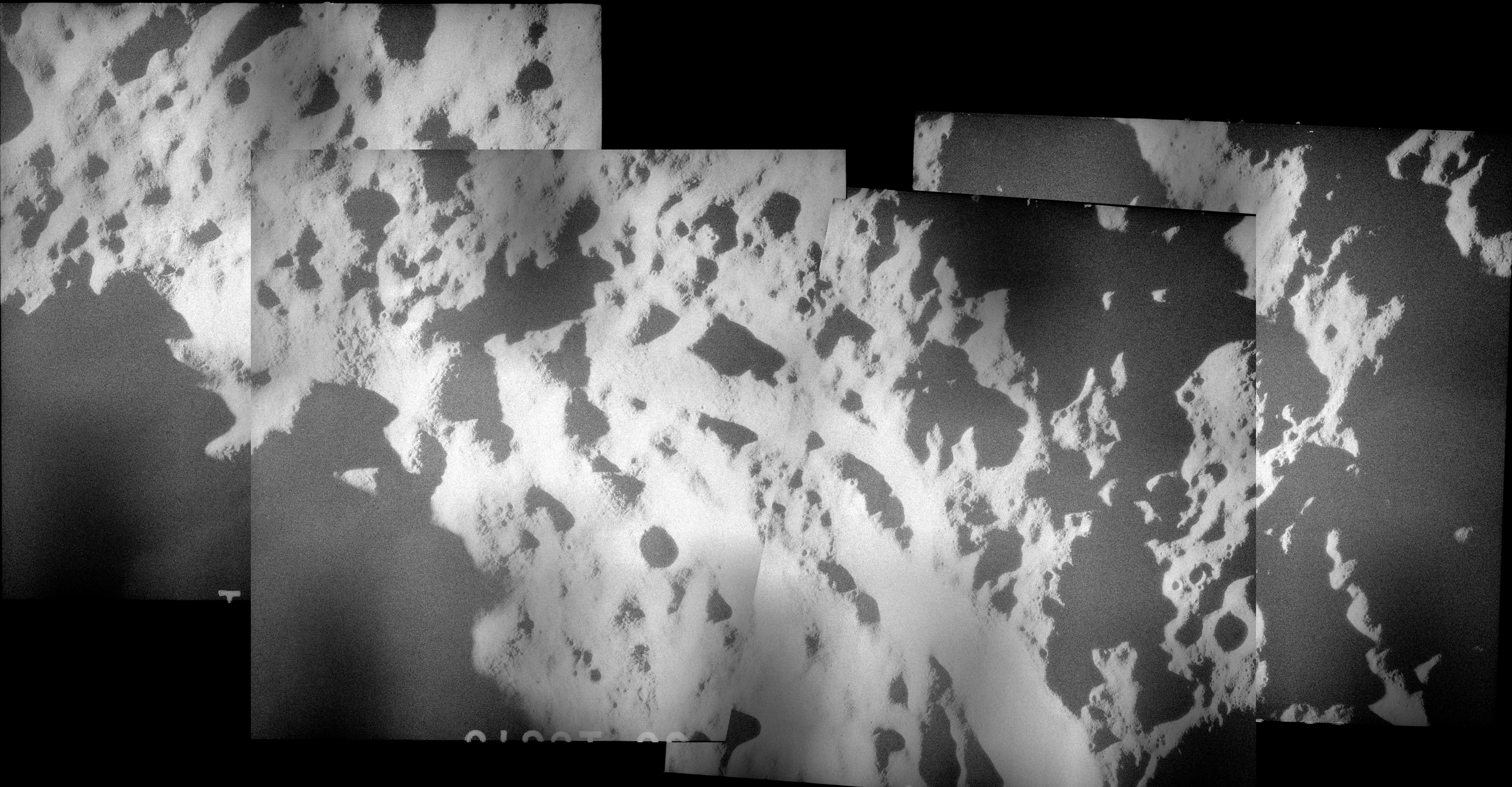
Apollo 15 mosaic of north rim area

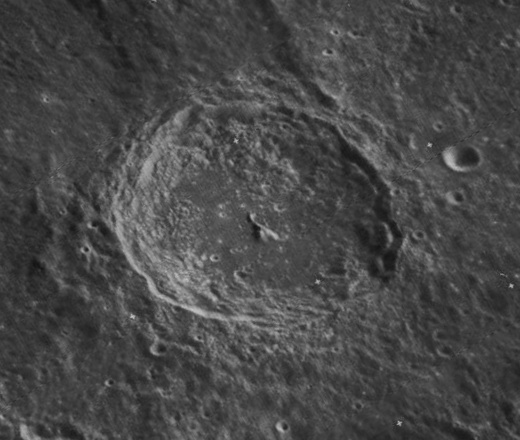
Oblique Lunar Orbiter 3 image, facing south

Scaliger is a prominent lunar impact crater in the southern hemisphere on the far side of the Moon. It is attached to the northwest rim of a walled plain named Milne, and the shared perimeter has reshaped the outer wall of Scaliger slightly, producing a straightened section along the southeast. To the west of Scaliger is the Lacus Solitudinis.

This formation dates to the Late Imbrian epoch of the lunar geologic timescale. The outer wall of Scaliger is somewhat polygonal in shape, especially in the southern half. The rim has not been heavily eroded by subsequent impacts, in contrast to the heavily worn Milne to the southeast. The inner wall of Scaliger's rim displays terraces, and a notable outer rampart overlaying the floor of Milne. The infrared spectrum of pure crystalline plagioclase has been identified within this crater.

The interior floor of Scaliger is relatively flat, with a rough surface near the inner wall. Near the midpoint is a central peak, offset slightly to the east. The spectra of this rise fits a olivine-bearing noritic gabbro mineralogy, which originated from a depth of 8.4 to 13.3 km.

== Satellite craters ==
By convention these features are identified on lunar maps by placing the letter on the side of the crater midpoint that is closest to Scaliger.

Scaliger	Latitude	Longitude	Diameter
U	26.6° S	106.5° E	11 km
