= 1635 Bohrmann =

Asteroid

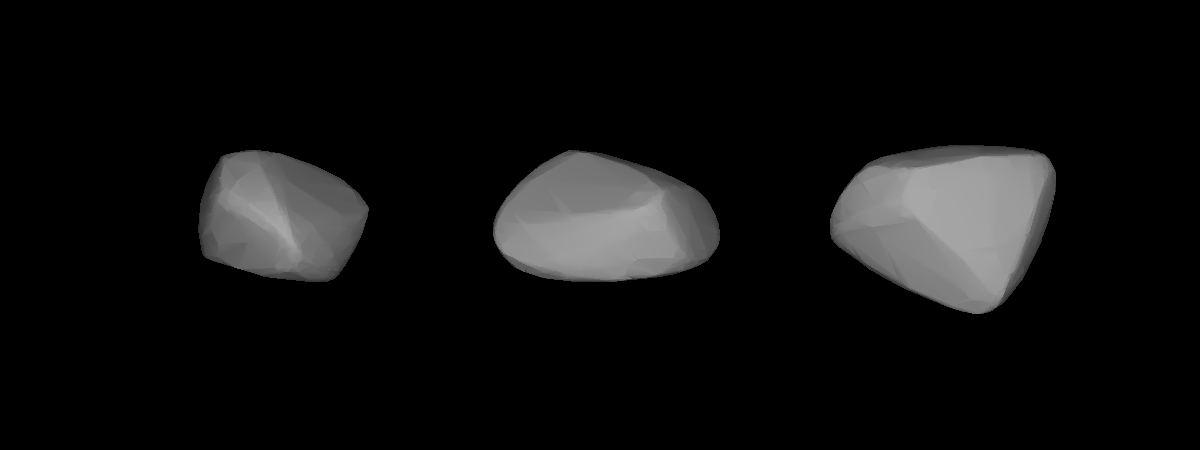
- A lightcurve-based 3D-model of Bohrmann

Discovery
- Discovered by: K. Reinmuth
- Discovery site: Heidelberg Obs.
- Discovery date: 7 March 1924

Designations
- Named after: Alfred Bohrmann (astronomer
- Alternative designations: 1924 QW · 1931 VH_{1} 1936 UJ · 1938 CH; 1939 HL · 1943 EG_{1} 1948 EA_{1} · 1953 FH
- Minor planet category: main-belt · Koronis

Orbital characteristics
- Epoch 4 September 2017 (JD 2458000.5)
- Uncertainty parameter 0
- Observation arc: 93.24 yr (34,057 days)
- Aphelion: 3.0174 AU
- Perihelion: 2.6894 AU
- Semi-major axis: 2.8534 AU
- Eccentricity: 0.0575
- Orbital period (sidereal): 4.82 yr (1,761 days)
- Mean anomaly: 357.19°
- Mean motion: 0° 12^{m} 16.2^{s} / day
- Inclination: 1.8222°
- Longitude of ascending node: 184.35°
- Argument of perihelion: 136.06°

Physical characteristics
- Dimensions: 16.60±0.82 km 17.12 km (calculated); 17.127±0.171; 17.533±0.244 km 19.12±0.70 km
- Synodic rotation period: 5.864±0.001 h 5.86427±0.00005 h 11.730±0.005 h 11.73±0.01 h
- Geometric albedo: 0.187±0.015; 0.2104±0.0154; 0.219±0.049; 0.24 (assumed); 0.255±0.052
- Spectral type: SMASS = S · S
- Absolute magnitude (H): 10.95±0.01 · 11.0 · 11.05±0.24 · 11.1

1635 Bohrmann, provisional designation 1924 QW, is a stony Koronian asteroid from the outer region of the asteroid belt, approximately 17 kilometers in diameter. It was discovered on 7 March 1924, by German astronomer Karl Reinmuth at Heidelberg Observatory in southern Germany, and named for astronomer Alfred Bohrmann.

== Orbit and classification ==
The stony S-type asteroid belongs to the Koronis family, a group consisting of few hundred known bodies with nearly ecliptical orbits. It orbits the Sun in the outer main-belt at a distance of 2.7–3.0 AU once every 4 years and 10 months (1,761 days). Its orbit has an eccentricity of 0.06 and an inclination of 2° with respect to the ecliptic.

As no precoveries were taken, Bohrmann's observation arc begins with the first used observation taken on the night following its discovery.

== Diameter and albedo ==
According to the surveys carried out by the Japanese Akari satellite and NASA's Wide-field Infrared Survey Explorer with its subsequent NEOWISE mission, Bohrmann measures between 16.6 and 19.1 kilometers in diameter, and its surface has an albedo between 0.187 and 0.255. The Collaborative Asteroid Lightcurve Link assumes a standard albedo for members of the Koronian family of 0.24, and calculates a diameter of 17.1 kilometers with an absolute magnitude of 11.0.

== Lightcurves ==
In September and October 2003, four rotational lightcurves were obtained for this asteroid from photometric observations at several observatories around the world, including the Whitin Observatory in Wellesley, Massachusetts, as well as by U.S. astronomers Robert Stephens and Brian Warner. The lightcurves gave two different solutions for the Bohrmann's rotation period. One solution gave 5.864±0.001 and 5.86427±0.00005 hours, while the alternative solution gave 11.73±0.01 and 11.730±0.005 hours. The lightcurves had a concurring brightness variation of 0.25 in magnitude (U=2/2/3/n.a.).

== Naming ==
This minor planet was named after German astronomer Alfred Bohrmann (1904–2000), a long-time observer of minor planets at the discovering Heidelberg Observatory and a discoverer of minor planets himself. During his career he had published several hundreds of precise observations of asteroids. The official naming citation was published by the Minor Planet Center on 20 February 1976 (M.P.C. 3931).
