= Bowditch (crater) =

Lunar impact crater

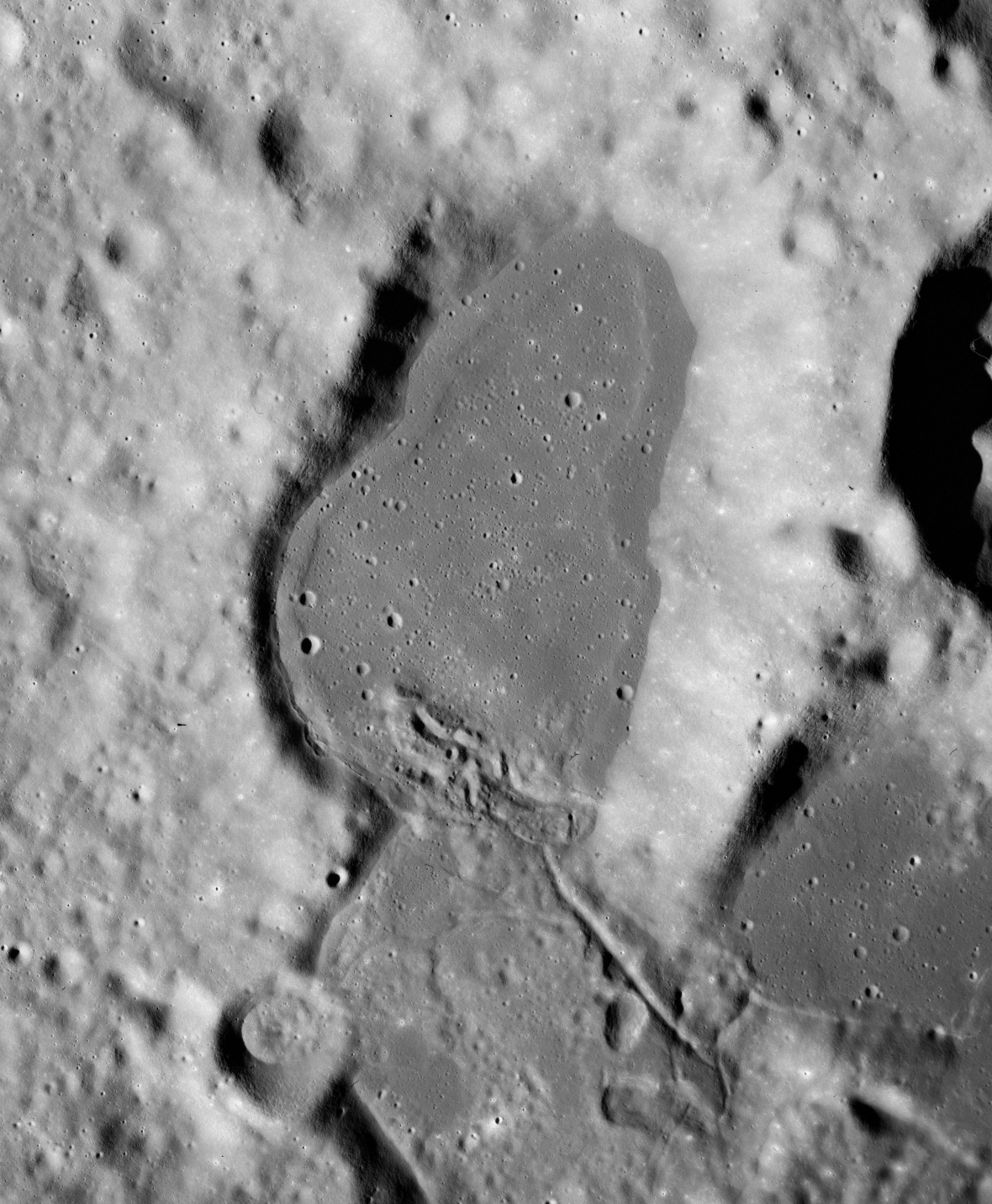
- Apollo 15 image
- Coordinates: 25.0°S 103.1°E
- Diameter: 43.04 km (26.74 mi)
- Depth: 0.5 km
- Colongitude: 254° at sunrise
- Eponym: Nathaniel Bowditch

Bowditch is a lunar impact crater that lies on the far side of the Moon, just beyond the eastern limb. It is located on a region of the lunar surface that is brought into view due to libration, but at such times the area is viewed from the edge and so not much detail can be observed. It lies just to the north of the small Lacus Solitudinis lunar mare, between the craters Titius to the southwest and Perel'man to the east-northeast.

The rim of this crater is open to the southwest and the crater is elongated to the northeast, possibly due to a merged crater. The outer rim varies in height, with the most prominent sections being the southwest face and a ridge mount to the northwest. The interior floor has been flooded with basaltic lava and is generally flat, with a number of small craters. However, there are some low ridges in the surface that are concentric with the inner wall. A formation of irregular ridges occupies most of the rim gap along the southwest.

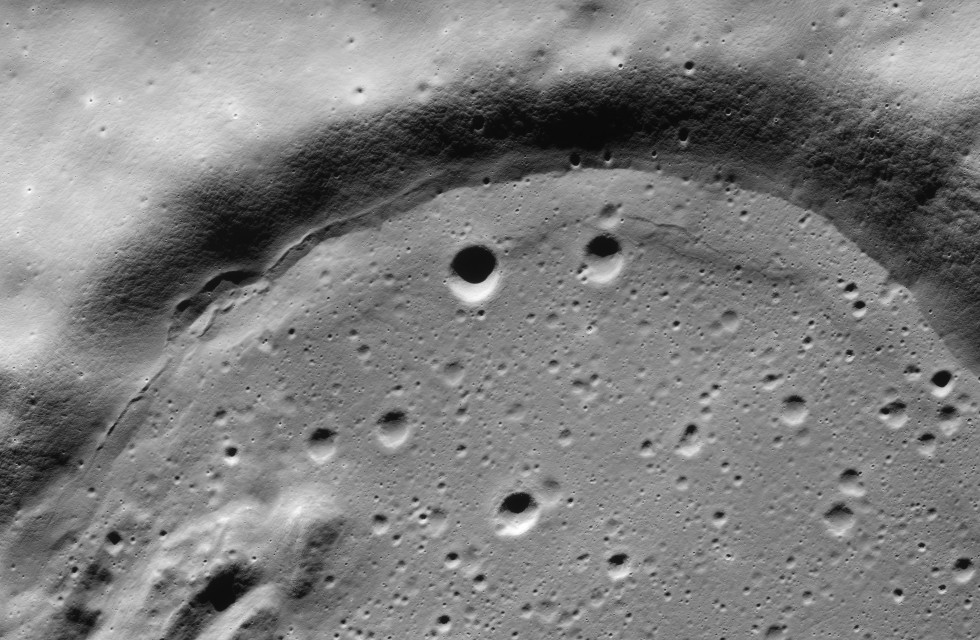
Oblique view of southwestern rim of Bowditch, showing "strand line" and terrace caused by receding lava

Bowditch is described in the Apollo 15 Preliminary Science Report, along with Lacus Solitudinis to the south, as a significant volcanic feature:

On the southwest wall of the oblong crater (Bowditch) is a distinct "strand line," marking the highest level reached by lava before cooling and withdrawal. A faint trace of this line exists in other parts of the wall. A prominent terrace (around all except the southern part of the outer edges of the floor) marks another state in the subsidence of the lava.

This formation is named after American astronomer and mathematician Nathaniel Bowditch (1773-1848). Its designation was formally adopted by the International Astronomical Union in 1976.

== Nearby craters ==
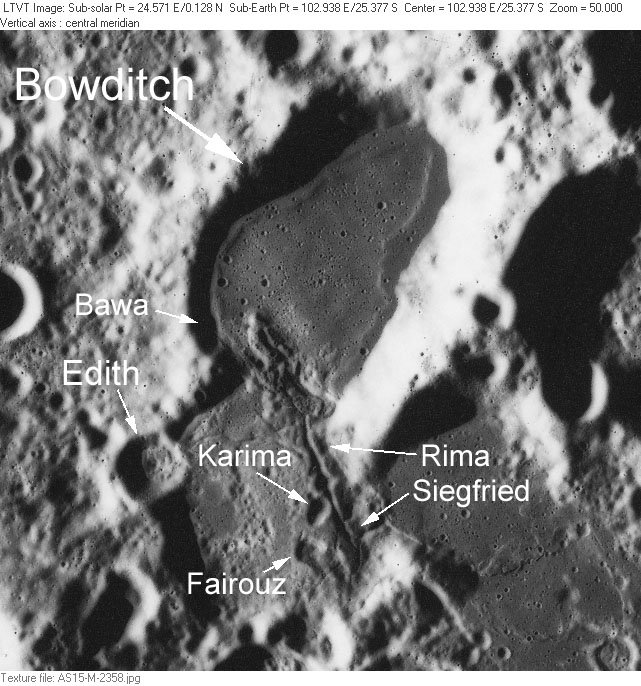

Near the southern rim of this formation, at the northern edge of the Lacus Solitudinus, are four tiny craters that have been assigned individual names by the IAU. These are listed below.

Crater	Longitude	Latitude	Diameter	Name source
Bawa	25.3° S	102.6° E	1 km	African masculine name
Edith	25.8° S	102.3° E	8 km	English feminine name
Fairouz	26.1° S	102.9° E	3 km	Arabic feminine name
Karima	25.9° S	103.0° E	3 km	Arabic feminine name

== Satellite craters ==
By convention these features are identified on lunar maps by placing the letter on the side of the crater midpoint that is closest to Bowditch.

Bowditch	Latitude	Longitude	Diameter
M	26.7° S	103.3° E	16 km
N	26.6° S	102.8° E	16 km
