= Phi2 Cancri =

Star in the constellation Cancer

Phi^{2} Cancri
Observation data Epoch J2000.0 Equinox ICRS
Constellation	Cancer
- φ^{2} Cnc A
Right ascension	08^{h} 26^{m} 47.07096^{s}
Declination	+26° 56′ 07.7588″
- Apparent magnitude (V): 6.26
- φ^{2} Cnc B
Right ascension	08^{h} 26^{m} 46.83329^{s}
Declination	+26° 56′ 03.6655″
- Apparent magnitude (V): 6.31

Characteristics

φ^{2} Cnc A
- Evolutionary stage: main sequence
- Spectral type: A6V or A5IV

φ^{2} Cnc B
- Evolutionary stage: main sequence
- Spectral type: A3V or A2 Vp(4481 wk)

Astrometry

φ^{2} Cnc A
Proper motion (μ)	RA: −7.487 mas/yr Dec.: +1.202 mas/yr
Parallax (π)	9.4528±0.0351 mas
Distance	345 ± 1 ly (105.8 ± 0.4 pc)

φ^{2} Cnc B
Proper motion (μ)	RA: −10.112 mas/yr Dec.: +0.110 mas/yr
Parallax (π)	9.3703±0.0306 mas
Distance	348 ± 1 ly (106.7 ± 0.3 pc)

Details

φ^{2} Cnc A
Mass	2.146±0.041 M_{☉}
Radius	3.176±0.067 R_{☉}
Luminosity	32.84+0.42 −0.049 L_{☉}
Surface gravity (log g)	3.689±0.006 cgs
Temperature	7,758+26 −41 K
Rotational velocity (v sin i)	149 km/s
Age	807±102 Myr

φ^{2} Cnc B
Mass	2.643±0.043 M_{☉}
Radius	2.559±0.056 R_{☉}
Luminosity	66±1 L_{☉}
Surface gravity (log g)	3.896+0.024 −0.027 cgs
Temperature	7,595+29 −37 K
Rotational velocity (v sin i)	133 km/s
Age	309±55 Myr

Other designations
- φ^{2} Cnc, 23 Cancri, BD+27°1612, FK5 2633, HIP 41404
- φ^{2} Cnc A: HD 71151, HR 3311, SAO 80188
- φ^{2} Cnc B: HD 71150, HR 3310, SAO 80187

Database references
SIMBAD	φ^{2} Cnc A
- φ^{2} Cnc B

Phi^{2} Cancri is a binary star system in the zodiac constellation of Cancer. Its name is a Bayer designation that is Latinized from φ^{2} Cancri, and abbreviated Phi^{2} Cnc or φ^{2} Cnc. With a combined apparent magnitude of 5.54, this system is faintly visible to the naked eye under ideal conditions. Parallax measurements give a distance of 345–348 light-years to this system. Both components are separated by 5.126 arcseconds on the sky. They were identified as a candidate wide binary system in 1988 based on a low angular separation and similar proper motions.

φ^{2} Cancri A, of apparent magnitude 6.26, has a spectral type A6V, making it an A-type main sequence star. A 1995 study found a class of A5IV, suggesting it is instead an aging subgiant star. It is about 800 million years old and has a high rate of spin, showing a projected rotational velocity of 149 km/s. This star has 2.1 times the mass of the Sun and 3.18 times the Sun's radius. It is radiating 33 times the luminosity of the Sun from its photosphere at an effective temperature of 7,758 K.

φ^{2} Cancri B, of apparent magnitude 6.31, is also an A-type main sequence star, of spectral type A3V. A 1995 study found this to be a chemically peculiar star with a class of A2 Vp(4481 wk). In addition to displaying evidence of variability, emission lines in the spectrum suggest this is a shell star. It has 2.6 times the Sun's mass and 2.56 times the radius. The star radiates 66 times the Sun's luminosity at an effective temperature of 7,595 K. This star is spinning rapidly with a projected rotational velocity of 133 km/s.
