= Erik Prosperin =

Swedish astronomer (1739–1803)

Erik Prosperin (25 July 1739 – 4 April 1803) was a Swedish astronomer.

Prosperin was a lecturer in mathematics and physics at Uppsala University in 1767, professor of observational astronomy (Observator) in 1773 – 1796, and professor of astronomy in 1797 – 1798. He became a member of the Royal Swedish Academy of Sciences (KVA) in Stockholm in 1771, a member of the Royal Society of Sciences in Uppsala in 1774 (secretary from 1786 onwards), and a member of the American Philosophical Society in 1803.

Prosperin was a famous calculator of orbits: comets, planets, and their satellites. He calculated the orbits of the new (discovered in 1781) planet Uranus — for which he proposed the names Astraea, Cybele, and Neptune — and its satellites. He was also one of the first to calculate the orbit of the first asteroid, 1 Ceres, in 1801.

Prosperin calculated orbits for a total of 84 comets, especially Comet Messier (C/1769 P1), Comet Lexell (D/1770 L1), the Great Comet of 1771 (C/1771 A1, 1770 II), Comet Montaigne (C/1774 P1), Comet Bode (C/1779 A1), and Comet Encke (2P/1795 V1).

The asteroid 7292 Prosperin was named in his honor.
