= 15 Cancri =

Star in the constellation Cancer

- Location of 15 Cancri (circled)

Observation data Epoch J2000.0 Equinox ICRS
- Constellation: Cancer
- Right ascension: 08^{h} 13^{m} 08.86806^{s}
- Declination: +29° 39′ 23.5368″
- Apparent magnitude (V): 5.53 - 5.65

Characteristics
- Evolutionary stage: main sequence
- Spectral type: A0:V:spSiSr
- B−V color index: −0.073±0.002
- Variable type: α^{2} CVn

Astrometry
Radial velocity (R_{v})	25.0±0.8 km/s
Proper motion (μ)	RA: −11.265 mas/yr Dec.: −19.506 mas/yr
Parallax (π)	4.6720±0.2238 mas
Distance	700 ± 30 ly (210 ± 10 pc)
Absolute magnitude (M_{V})	−0.97

Orbit
Primary	15 Cancri A
Name	15 Cancri B
Period (P)	635.73±0.53 days (Note: An alternate period of 475 days is possible but less likely.)
Eccentricity (e)	0.55±0.08
Periastron epoch (T)	2422045±18
Argument of periastron (ω) (primary)	196±13°
Semi-amplitude (K_{1}) (primary)	9.6±1.1 km/s

Details

15 Cnc A
Mass	2.4 M_{☉}
Radius	3.4 R_{☉}
Luminosity	131 L_{☉}
Surface gravity (log g)	3.68 cgs
Temperature	10,400 K
Rotation	6.563 days
Rotational velocity (v sin i)	25 km/s
Age	358 Gyr

Other designations
- 15 Cnc, BM Cnc, BD+30°1664, HD 68351, HIP 40240, HR 3215, GSC 01939-01462

Database references
SIMBAD	data

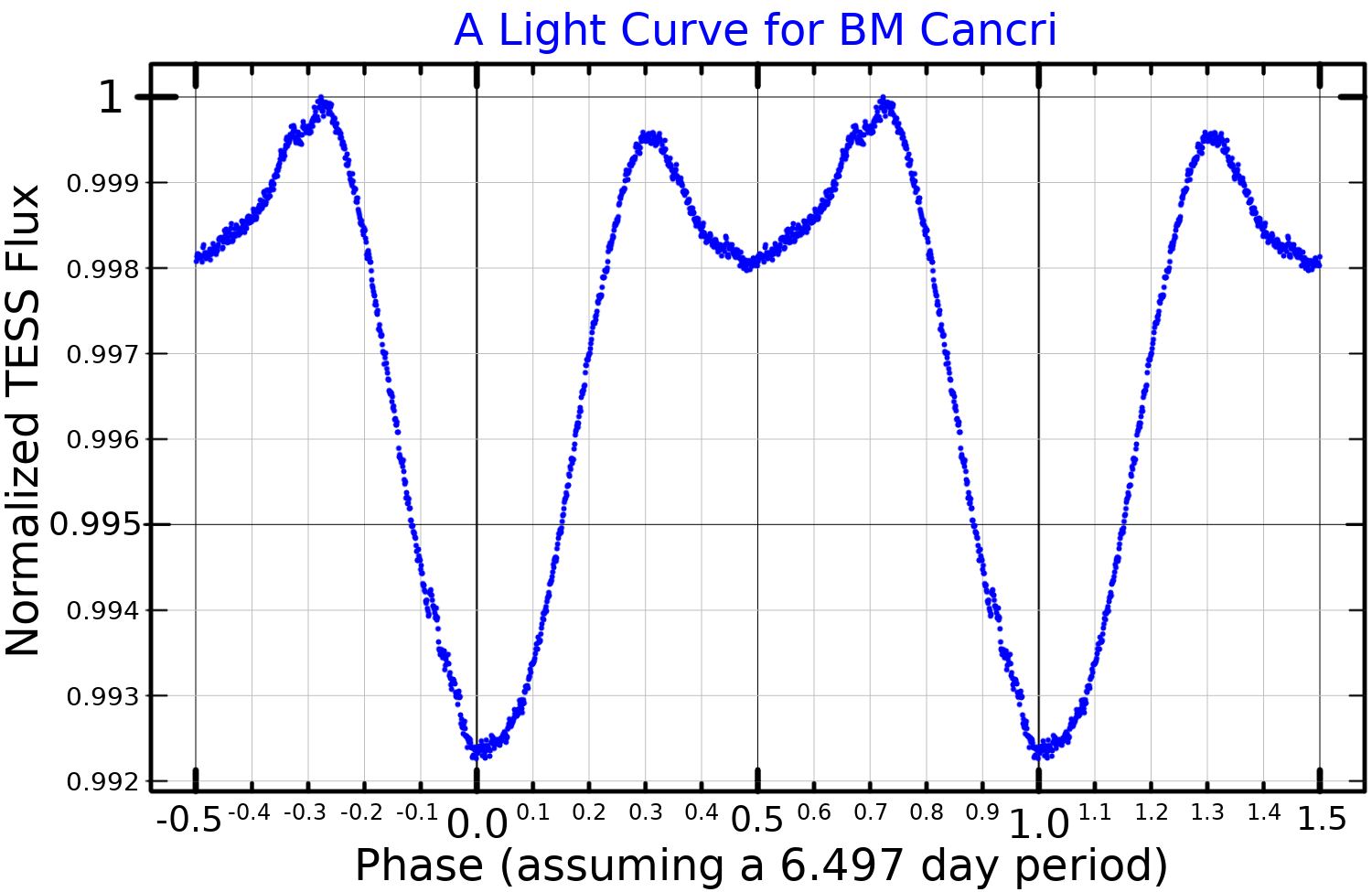
A light curve for BM Cancri, plotted from TESS data

15 Cancri is an α^{2} CVn-type variable star in the zodiac constellation of Cancer, located around 700 light years away. It has the variable star designation BM Cancri (BM Cnc); 15 Cancri (15 Cnc) is the Flamsteed designation. This system is visible to the naked eye as a faint, white-hued star with an apparent visual magnitude of about 5.6. It is moving away from the Earth with a heliocentric radial velocity of 25 km/s.

Radial velocity measurements taken at the Dominion Astrophysical Observatory in Victoria, British Columbia Canada in 1918 and 1919 led to the determination that 15 Cancri is a single-lined spectroscopic binary system. The first orbit was calculated in 1973 by Helmut Abt and Michael Snowden with a period of 585 days however later measurements showed that the orbital period was 635 days.

15 Cancri A, the visible component, is an Ap star, a chemically peculiar star with an over-abundance of iron peak elements, particularly silicon, chromium, and strontium, in its spectrum.

Like all Ap stars, 15 Cancri has a strong magnetic field. This magnetic field varies as it rotates and in 1968 the visual brightness of the star was shown to vary regularly over about four days. 15 Cancri was given the variable star designation BM Cancri in 1972 as a member of the α^{2} CVn class of variable stars. The period has since been measured more accurately at 3.3095 d, believed to be the rotational period of the star.

In Johann Bayer’s Uranometria, this star was designated as Psi Geminorum. When the constellation borders were set in 1930, it was moved to Cancer, so the designation has been dropped.
