= 13 Cancri =

Star in the constellation Cancer

- Location of 13 Cancri (circled)

Observation data Epoch J2000.0 Equinox ICRS
- Constellation: Cancer
- Right ascension: 08^{h} 10^{m} 13.107^{s}
- Declination: +25° 50′ 40.13″
- Apparent magnitude (V): +6.41

Characteristics
- Evolutionary stage: red giant branch
- Spectral type: K3 III
- B−V color index: 1.420±0.015

Astrometry
Radial velocity (R_{v})	4.96±0.23 km/s
Proper motion (μ)	RA: −14.654 mas/yr Dec.: −30.976 mas/yr
Parallax (π)	3.3894±0.0255 mas
Distance	962 ± 7 ly (295 ± 2 pc)
Absolute magnitude (M_{V})	−0.56

Details
Mass	4.90^{+0.04}_{−0.11} M_{☉}
Radius	34.1±0.2 R_{☉}
Luminosity	486.0±6.5 L_{☉}
Surface gravity (log g)	1.820±0.006 cgs
Temperature	4,522±5 K

Other designations
- ψ^{1} Cancri, 13 Cnc, BD+26°1728, GC 11082, HD 67690, HIP 40007, SAO 79991, CCDM 08102+2551, WDS J08102+2551A

Database references
SIMBAD	data

13 Cancri is a star in the zodiacal constellation of Cancer. Its name is a Flamsteed designation, abbreviated 13 Cnc; it has the Bayer designation ψ^{1} Cancri, although this is rarely used. This is one of the few Bayer or Flamsteed designated stars that are not listed in the Bright Star Catalogue. It is near the lower limit of stellar brightness that is still visible to the naked eye, having an apparent visual magnitude of +6.41. Based on a parallax measurements, it is located at a distance of 962 light-years (295 pc) from the Earth. The star is drifting further away with a line of sight velocity of 5 km/s. In 1986, O. J. Eggen included it as a probable member of the Hyades Stream of co-moving stars.

This is an aging K-type giant star with a stellar classification of K3 III, having exhausted the supply of hydrogen at its core and evolved away from the main sequence. Stellar models of this star indicate it has an estimated 4.9 times the mass of the Sun and has expanded to 34 times the Sun's radius. It is radiating 486 times the luminosity of the Sun from its photosphere at an effective temperature of 4,522 K.
