= Phi1 Cancri =

Star in the constellation Cancer

Phi^{1} Cancri
Observation data Epoch J2000.0 Equinox J2000.0 (ICRS)
- Constellation: Cancer
- Right ascension: 08^{h} 26^{m} 27.706^{s}
- Declination: +27° 53′ 36.89″
- Apparent magnitude (V): +5.57

Characteristics
- Spectral type: K5 III
- U−B color index: +1.68
- B−V color index: +1.40

Astrometry
Radial velocity (R_{v})	+25.25±0.19 km/s
Proper motion (μ)	RA: −33.427 mas/yr Dec.: −115.457 mas/yr
Parallax (π)	7.5571±0.0757 mas
Distance	432 ± 4 ly (132 ± 1 pc)
Absolute magnitude (M_{V})	+0.29

Details
Mass	1.27^{+1.21}_{−0.45} M_{☉}
Radius	27 R_{☉}
Luminosity	195^{+14}_{−13} L_{☉}
Temperature	4,100±80 K
Metallicity [Fe/H]	−0.134±0.093 dex
Rotational velocity (v sin i)	1.3 km/s

Other designations
- φ^{1} Cnc, 22 Cancri, BD+28°1602, FK5 2656, HD 71093, HIP 41377, HR 3304, SAO 80181

Database references
SIMBAD	data

Phi^{1} Cancri is a solitary, orange-hued star in the constellation Cancer. Its name is a Bayer designation that is Latinized from φ^{1} Cancri, and abbreviated Phi^{1} Cnc or φ^{1} Cnc. This star is faintly visible to the naked eye with an apparent visual magnitude of +5.57. Based upon an annual parallax shift of 7.56 mas, it is approximately 432 light-years (132 pc) distant from the Sun. The star is drifting further away with a line of sight velocity of +25 km/s.

This is an evolved K-type giant star with a stellar classification of K5 III, having exhausted the hydrogen at its core then expanded off from the main sequence. The measured angular diameter of this star, after correction for limb darkening, is 1.87±0.02 mas. At the estimated distance of Phi^{1} Cancri, this yields a physical size of about 27 times the radius of the Sun. It has 1.3 times the mass of the Sun and is radiating 195 times the Sun's luminosity from its photosphere at an effective temperature of 4,100 K.
