= Johann Daniel Titius =

German astronomer (1729 – 1796)

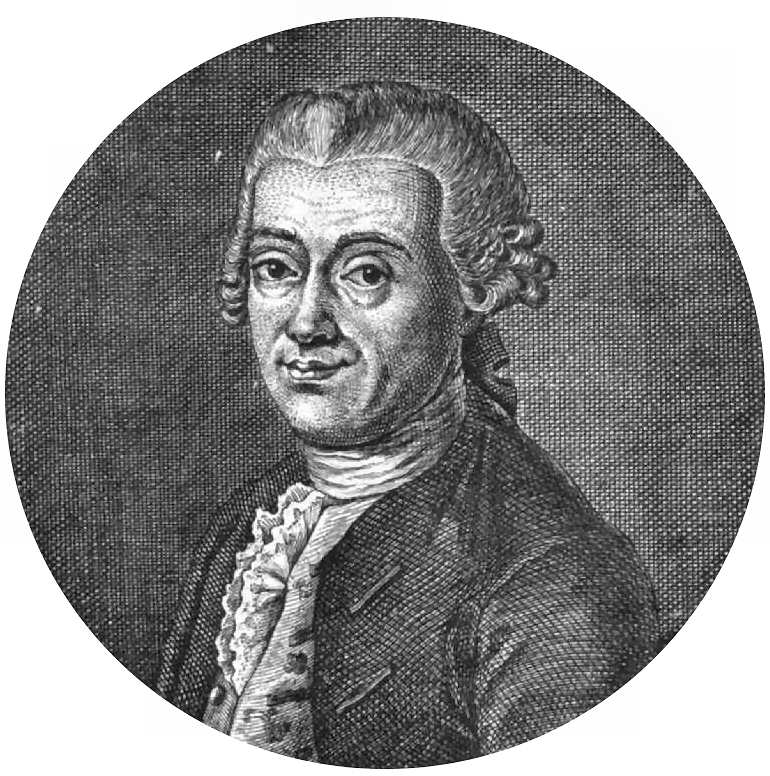
- Johann Daniel Titius
- Born: Johann Daniel Tietz; 2 January 1729; Konitz (Chojnice), Royal Prussia, Crown of Poland
- Died: 16 December 1796 (aged 67); Wittenberg, Electorate of Saxony
- Known for: Titius–Bode law
- Scientific career
- Fields: Astronomy, physics, biology

Johann Daniel Titius (born Johann Daniel Tietz(e), 2 January 1729 – 16 December 1796) was a German astronomer and a professor at Wittenberg.

Titius was born in Konitz (Chojnice), Royal Prussia (Crown of Poland) to Jakob Tietz, a merchant and council member from Konitz, and Maria Dorothea, née Hanow. His original name was Johann Tietz, but as was customary in the 18th century, when he became a university professor, he Latinized his surname to Titius. Tietz attended school in Danzig (Gdańsk) and studied at the University of Leipzig (1749–1752). He died in Wittenberg, Electorate of Saxony.

== Astronomy ==
He is best known for formulating the Titius–Bode law, and for using this rule to predict the existence of a celestial object at 2.8 AU from the sun which led to the 1801 discovery of what we now know as Ceres. He drew up the law in 1766, when he inserted his mathematical observation on planetary distances into a German translation of Charles Bonnet's book Contemplation de la Nature. In part because of this law, the first four minor planets were at first labeled as full-fledged planets. After a fifteen-year hiatus, other minor planets started to be discovered at steadily increasing rates, and Ceres and company were eventually relabeled as minor planets or asteroids. Because of its spherical shape, Ceres has had upgraded status as a dwarf planet since 2006.

The asteroid 1998 Titius and the crater Titius on the Moon are named in his honour.

== Physics ==
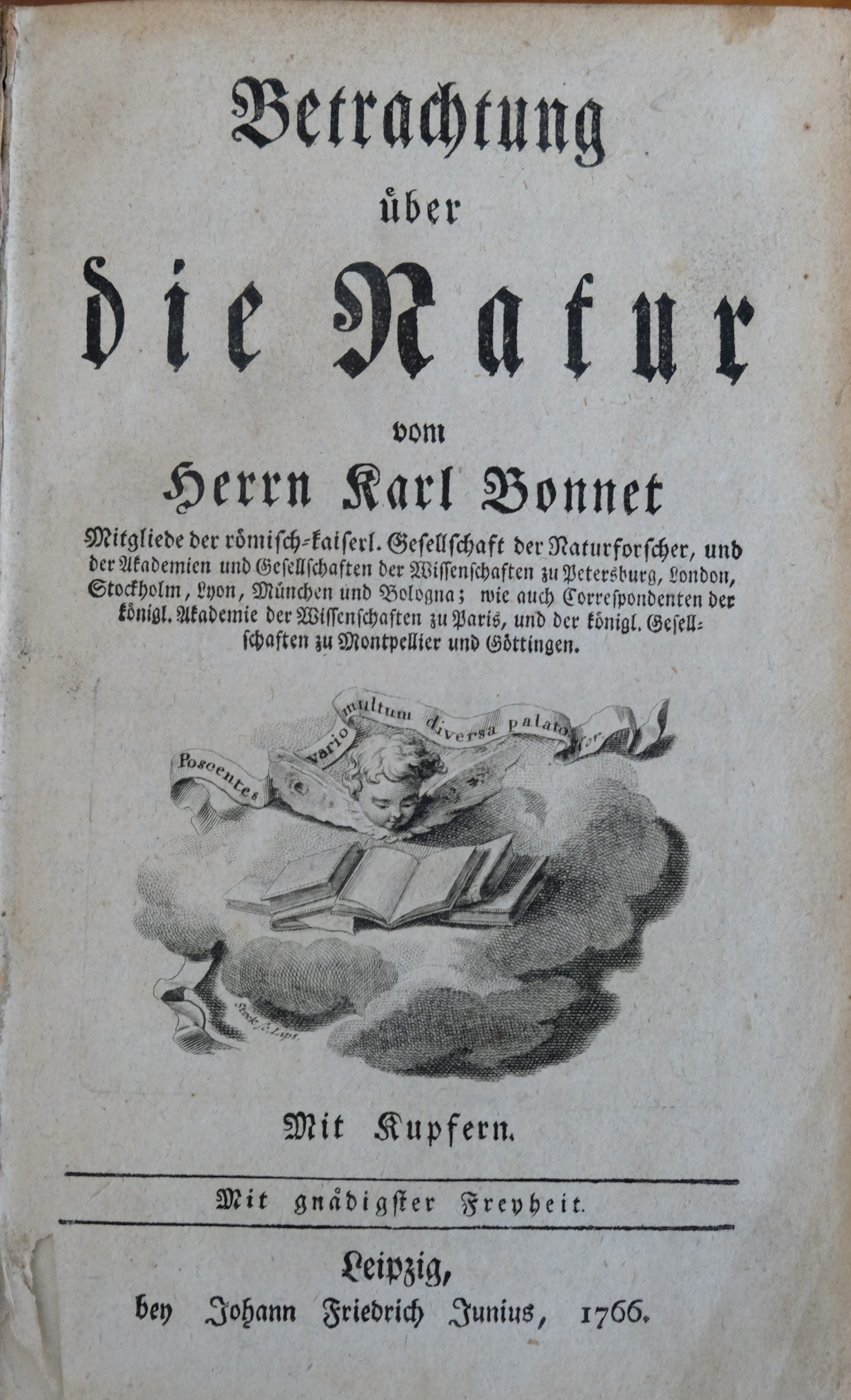
1766 German edition of Contemplation de la Nature, or Betrachtung über die Natur, written by Charles Bonnet and translated by Johann Daniel Titius

Titius published a number of works on other areas in physics, such as a set of conditions and rules for performing experiments, and he was particularly focused in thermometry. In 1765 he presented a survey of thermometry up to that date. He wrote about the metallic thermometer constructed by Hanns Loeser. In his treatises on both theoretical and experimental physics, he incorporated the findings of other scientists, such as the descriptions of experiments written by Georg Wolfgang Kraft in 1738.

== Biology ==
Titius was also active in biology, particularly in classification of organisms and minerals. His biological work was influenced by Linnaeus. Lehrbegriff der Naturgeschichte Zum ersten Unterrichte, his most extensive publication in biology, was on systematic classification of plants, animals, and minerals, as well as the elemental substances ether, fire, air, water and earth.
