= Lacus Solitudinis =

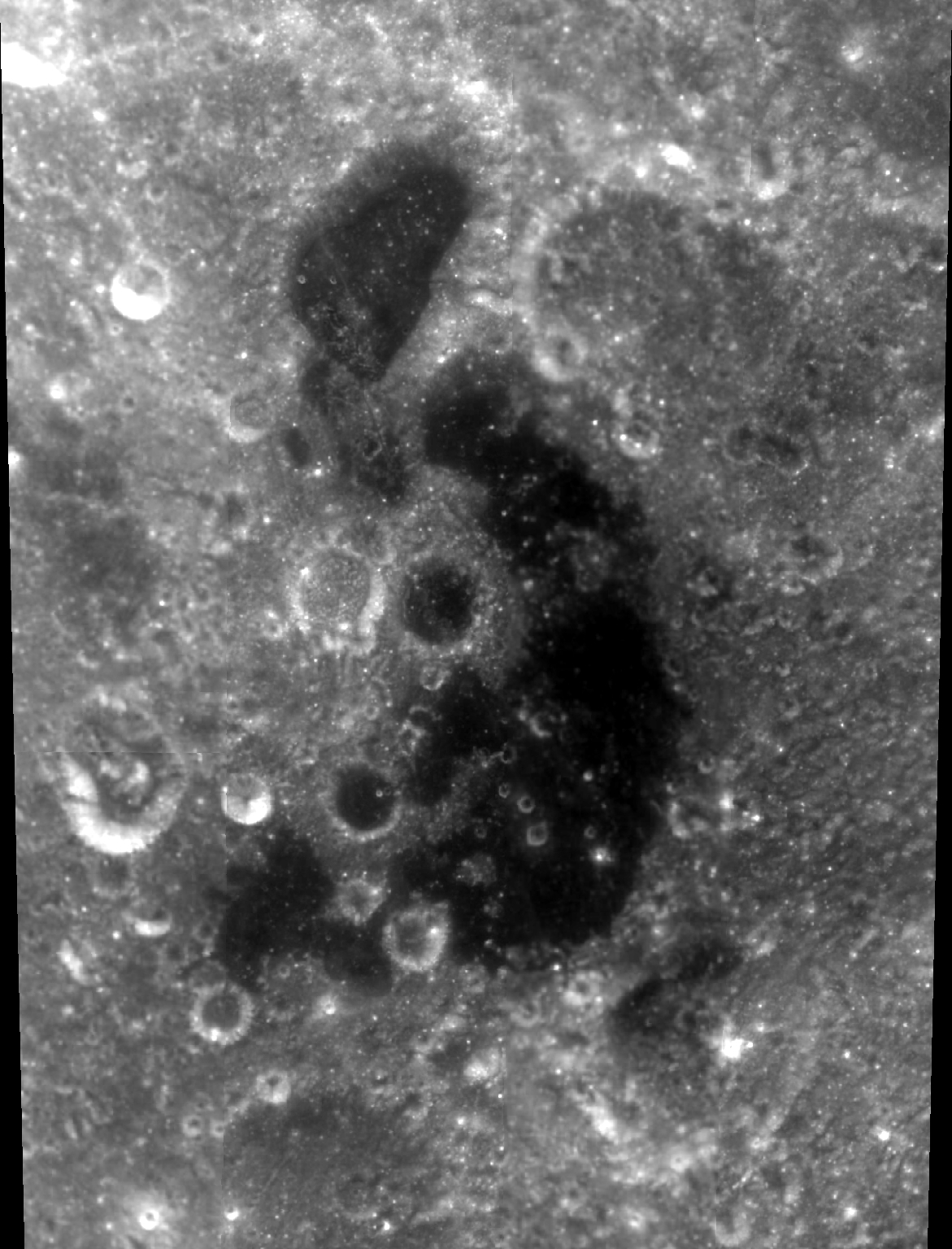
- Coordinates: 27.8°S 104.3°E
- Diameter: 139 km
- Formation: Imbrian
- Eponym: Lake of Solitude

Lacus Solitudinis (Latin sōlitūdinis, "Lake of Solitude") is a small lunar mare on the far side of the Moon. The selenographic coordinates of the lake are 27.8° S, 104.3° E, and it lies within a diameter of 139 km. It forms an arcing feature with the concave side oriented to the northwest. The eastern edge is relatively continuous, while the west is more irregular and disrupted by small craters. The mare material is dated to the Imbrian epoch of the lunar geologic timescale, while the surroundings are Nectarian.

To the northwest of the northern end is the small crater Bowditch, a lava-flooded feature although it does not appear directly connected to the Lacus Solitudinis. At the western end of the mare, the eroded crater Titius lies to the northwest. To the south of this feature is Parkhurst Y, with Parkhurst itself lying some distance to the southeast.

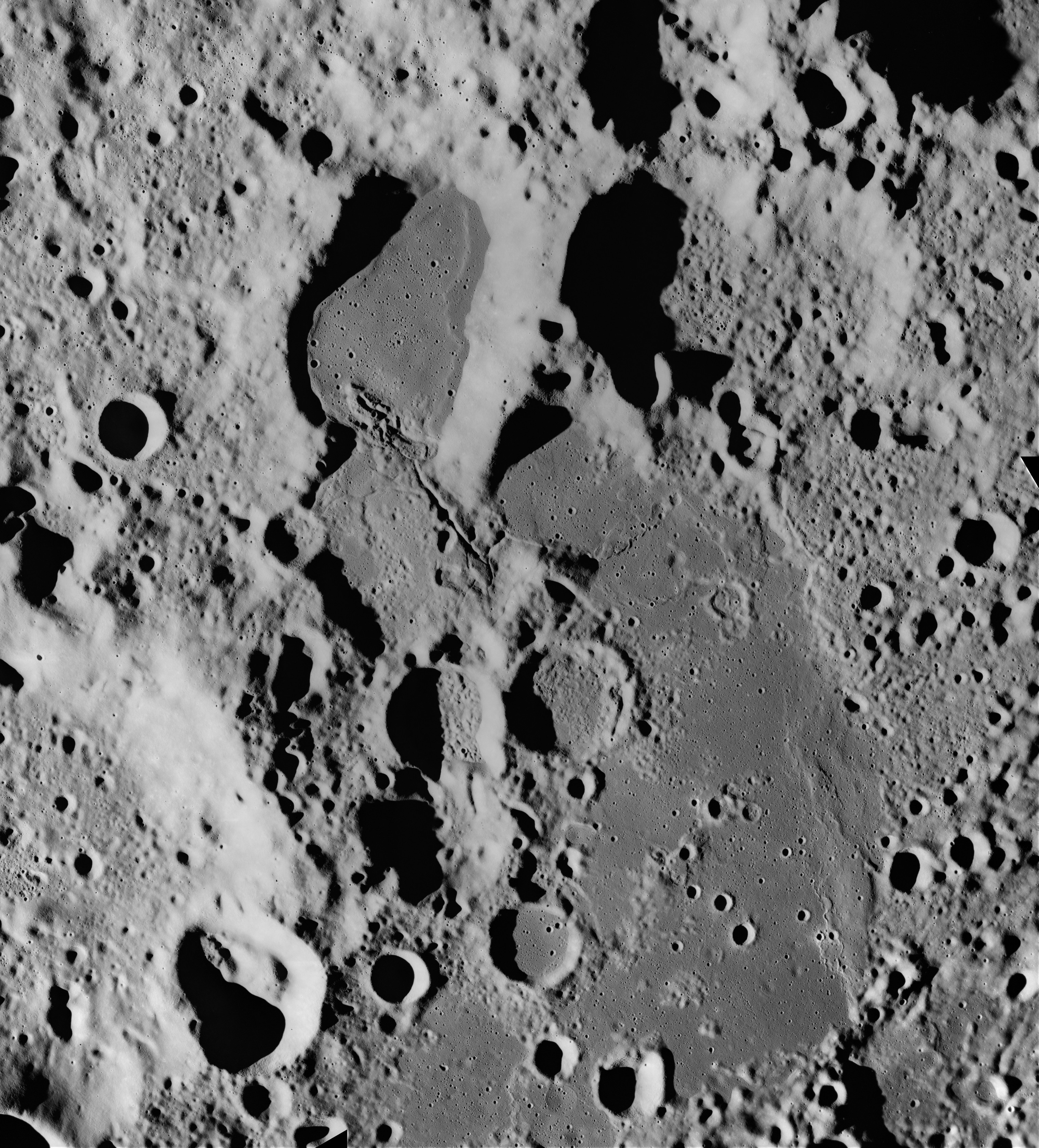
Apollo 15 mapping camera image
