= HD 107914 =

Star in the constellation Centaurus

Observation data Epoch J2000.0 Equinox J2000.0
- Constellation: Centaurus
- Right ascension: 12^{h} 24^{m} 12.93679^{s}
- Declination: −38° 54′ 49.7344″
- Apparent magnitude (V): 6.87±0.01

Characteristics
- Evolutionary stage: main sequence
- Spectral type: A7/8 III
- B−V color index: +0.28

Astrometry
| Proper motion (μ) | RA: +0.085 mas/yr Dec.: +0.966 mas/yr |
| Parallax (π) | 12.5254±0.0221 mas |
| Distance | 260.4 ± 0.5 ly (79.8 ± 0.1 pc) |
| Absolute magnitude (M_{V}) | +2.41 |

Details
| Mass | 1.6 M_{☉} |
| Radius | 1.9 R_{☉} |
| Luminosity | 8.9 L_{☉} |
| Surface gravity (log g) | 4.01 cgs |
| Temperature | 7,261 K |
| Metallicity [Fe/H] | −0.62 dex |
| Age | 1.2 Gyr |

Other designations
- CCDM J12242-3855AB, CD−38°7710, HIP 60503, HD 107914, SAO 203431

Database references
| SIMBAD | data |

HD 107914 is the primary component of a binary star system in the constellation Centaurus, with an estimated distance of 255.5 light-years (78.3 pc) from the Solar System. It has a stellar classification of A7-8 III, making it a giant star.

Measurement of the proper motion of this system show that it has a low transverse velocity relative to the Sun. For this reason, it has been compared to the hypothetical "Nemesis" star since it may pass through the Oort cloud in the future. The star is too far away to be a companion to the Sun. However, preliminary measurements of the H-alpha line in the star's spectrum show a radial velocity in the range from –13 to +3 km/s. (This result was obtained by M. Muterspaugh and M. Williamson at a robotic spectroscopic telescope in Arizona.) Such values for the radial velocity are too small to produce a likely collision course with the Solar System. For example, if V_{r} = –10 km/s, then the distance from the Sun to HD 107914 at closest approach will be about 5.2 ly (1.6 pc).
