= Shiva hypothesis =

Scientific theory concerning impact events

The Shiva hypothesis, also known as coherent catastrophism, is the idea that global natural catastrophes on Earth, such as extinction events, happen at regular intervals because of the periodic motion of the Sun in relation to the Milky Way galaxy.

== Initial proposal in 1979 ==
William Napier and Victor Clube in their 1979 Nature article, ”A Theory of Terrestrial Catastrophism”, proposed the idea that gravitational disturbances caused by the Solar System crossing the plane of the Milky Way galaxy are enough to disturb comets in the Oort cloud surrounding the Solar System. This sends comets in towards the inner Solar System, which raises the chance of an impact. According to the hypothesis, this results in the Earth experiencing large impact events about every 30 million years (such as the Cretaceous–Paleogene extinction event).

== Later work by Rampino ==
Starting in 1984, Michael R. Rampino published followup research on the hypothesis. Certainly Rampino was aware of Napier and Clube's earlier publication, as Rampino and Stothers' letter to Nature in 1984 references it.

In the 1990s, Rampino and Bruce Haggerty renamed Napier and Clube's Theory of Terrestrial Catastrophism after Shiva, the Hindu god of destruction. In 2020, Rampino and colleagues published non-marine evidence corroborating previous marine evidence in support of the Shiva hypothesis.

== Similar theories ==
The Sun's passage through the higher density spiral arms of the galaxy, rather than its passage through the plane of the galaxy, could hypothetically coincide with mass extinction on Earth. However, a reanalysis of the effects of the Sun's transit through the spiral structure based on CO data has failed to find a correlation.

The Shiva Hypothesis may have inspired yet another theory: that a brown dwarf named Nemesis causes extinctions every 26 million years, which varies slightly from 30 million years.

== Criticism ==
The idea of extinction periodicity has been criticised due to the fact that the hypothesis assumes that most or all extinction events have the same cause, when evidence suggests that extinctions are likely the result of a variety of causes that are unlikely to be cyclically induced.

== See also ==
- Local Bubble
- Tyche (hypothetical planet)
