= C/1848 P1 (Petersen) =

Parabolic comet

Discovery
- Discovered by: Adolph Cornelius Petersen
- Discovery site: Altona, Germany
- Discovery date: 8 August 1848

Designations
- Alternative designations: 1848 I

Orbital characteristics
- Epoch: 8 September 1848 (JD 2396279.0453)
- Observation arc: 19 days
- Number of observations: 30
- Perihelion: 0.319 AU
- Eccentricity: ~1.000
- Inclination: 95.594°
- Longitude of ascending node: 213.650°
- Argument of periapsis: 260.948°
- Last perihelion: 8 September 1848
- Comet total magnitude (M1): 8.1

Comet Petersen, also known as C/1848 P1 by modern nomenclature, is a parabolic comet that was seen during the month of August 1848. It is first of three comets discovered by German astronomer, Adolph Cornelius Petersen.

== Observational history ==
Adolph C. Petersen discovered his first of two comets of the year as a "small, bright, well-defined object" in the constellation Auriga on 7 August 1848. (Note: Reported initial position upon discovery was: α = 6^{h} 15^{m} , δ = 41° 19′) Further observations in the following days proved to be increasingly difficult as it dropped steadily deeper into the morning twilight.

It was last observed on 27 August 1848, though it was predicted that it had reached perihelion by the next month. Recalculations of its orbit together with C/1848 U1 (another comet also discovered by Petersen) in 2014 show both comets have parabolic and hyperbolic trajectories respectively, suggesting their possible origin in the Oort cloud.
