= Extinction event =

Rapid decrease in Earth's biodiversity

The apparent percentage (not the absolute number) of marine animal genera extinction during any given time interval. It does not represent all marine species, just those that are readily fossilized. The labels of the traditional "Big Five" extinction events and the more recently recognised Capitanian mass extinction event are clickable links. The two extinction events occurring in the Cambrian (far left) are very large in percentage magnitude, but small in absolute numbers of known taxa due to the relative scarcity of fossil-producing life at that time. (source and image info)

An extinction event (also known as a mass extinction or biotic crisis) is a widespread and rapid decrease in the biodiversity on Earth. Such an event is identified by a sharp fall in the diversity and abundance of multicellular organisms. It occurs when the rate of extinction increases with respect to the background extinction rate and the rate of speciation.

Estimates of the number of major mass extinctions in the last 540 million years range from as few as five to more than twenty. These differences stem from disagreement as to what constitutes a "major" extinction event, and the data chosen to measure past diversity.

== The "Big Five" mass extinction events ==
In a landmark paper published in 1982, Jack Sepkoski and David M. Raup identified five particular geological intervals with excessive diversity loss. They were originally identified as outliers on a general trend of decreasing extinction rates during the Phanerozoic, but as more stringent statistical tests have been applied to the accumulating data, it has been established that in the current Phanerozoic Eon, multicellular animal life has experienced at least five major and many minor mass extinctions. The "Big Five" cannot be so clearly defined, but rather appear to represent the largest (or some of the largest) of a relatively smooth continuum of extinction events.

The "Big Five" of the Phanerozoic Eon were anciently preceded by the presumed far more extensive mass extinction of microbial life during the Great Oxidation Event (also known as the Oxygen Catastrophe) early in the Proterozoic Eon. At the end of the Ediacaran and just before the Cambrian explosion, yet another Proterozoic extinction event (of unknown magnitude) is speculated to have ushered in the Phanerozoic. Several events in the Cambrian and early Ordovician meet or exceed the "Big Five" in proportional severity, though overall diversity was rather low until the Great Ordovician Biodiversification Event (GOBE). Sepkoski and Raup (1982) initially tracked absolute (rather than proportional) extinction, so their biodiversity estimates overlooked events prior to the GOBE.

=== Late Ordovician mass extinction, 445–444 Ma ===
The Late Ordovician mass extinction (LOME) was probably a two-pulse event just prior to and at the Ordovician–Silurian transition. The first pulse corresponds to a cooling event and large Southern glaciation, while the second coincided with the thaw. Together, they killed off 27% of all families, 57% of all genera and 85% of all species. As a result, many scientists rank the LOME as the second-largest of the five major extinctions in Earth's history in terms of percentage of genera that became extinct.

In May 2020, studies suggested that the causes of the mass extinction were global warming, related to volcanism, and anoxia, and not, as considered earlier, cooling and glaciation. However, this is at odds with numerous previous studies, which have indicated global cooling as the primary driver, at least for the first pulse. Most recently, the deposition of volcanic ash has been suggested to be the trigger for reductions in atmospheric carbon dioxide leading to the glaciation and anoxia observed in the geological record.

=== Late Devonian mass extinction, 372 Ma ===
The Late Devonian was an epoch with high diversity loss, concentrated into two major extinction events. Scientists have linked both extinctions to anoxic events, where seawater is deprived of oxygen on a global scale. These anoxic events may have been caused by a combination of volcanic activity, weathering due to land plants, and climate change, though the exact details are still debated.

The larger of the two was the Kellwasser Event at the Frasnian-Famennian boundary (F-F, 372 Ma), about midway through the Late Devonian. "Late Devonian mass extinction" most frequently refers to this event in particular. This extinction annihilated coral reefs and numerous tropical benthic (seabed-living) animals such as jawless fish, brachiopods, and trilobites. Many scientists believe that the Kellwasser event resulted from land nutrients being carried into the ocean by rivers. These nutrients caused massive algal blooms. As the algae died and decomposed, they consumed dissolved oxygen in the water column, leading to anoxic conditions which eventually caused the extinctions.

The other major Late Devonian extinction was the Hangenberg Event at the Devonian-Carboniferous boundary (D-C, 359 Ma), which brought an end to the Devonian as a whole. This extinction wiped out the armored placoderm fish and nearly led to the extinction of the newly evolved ammonoids.

Together, the Kellwasser event and the Hangenberg event eliminated about 19% of all families, 50% of all genera and at least 70% of all species. Sepkoski and Raup (1982) did not initially consider the Late Devonian extinction interval (Givetian, Frasnian, and Famennian stages) to be statistically significant. Regardless, later studies have affirmed the strong ecological impacts of the Kellwasser and Hangenberg Events.

=== Permian–Triassic extinction event, 252 Ma ===
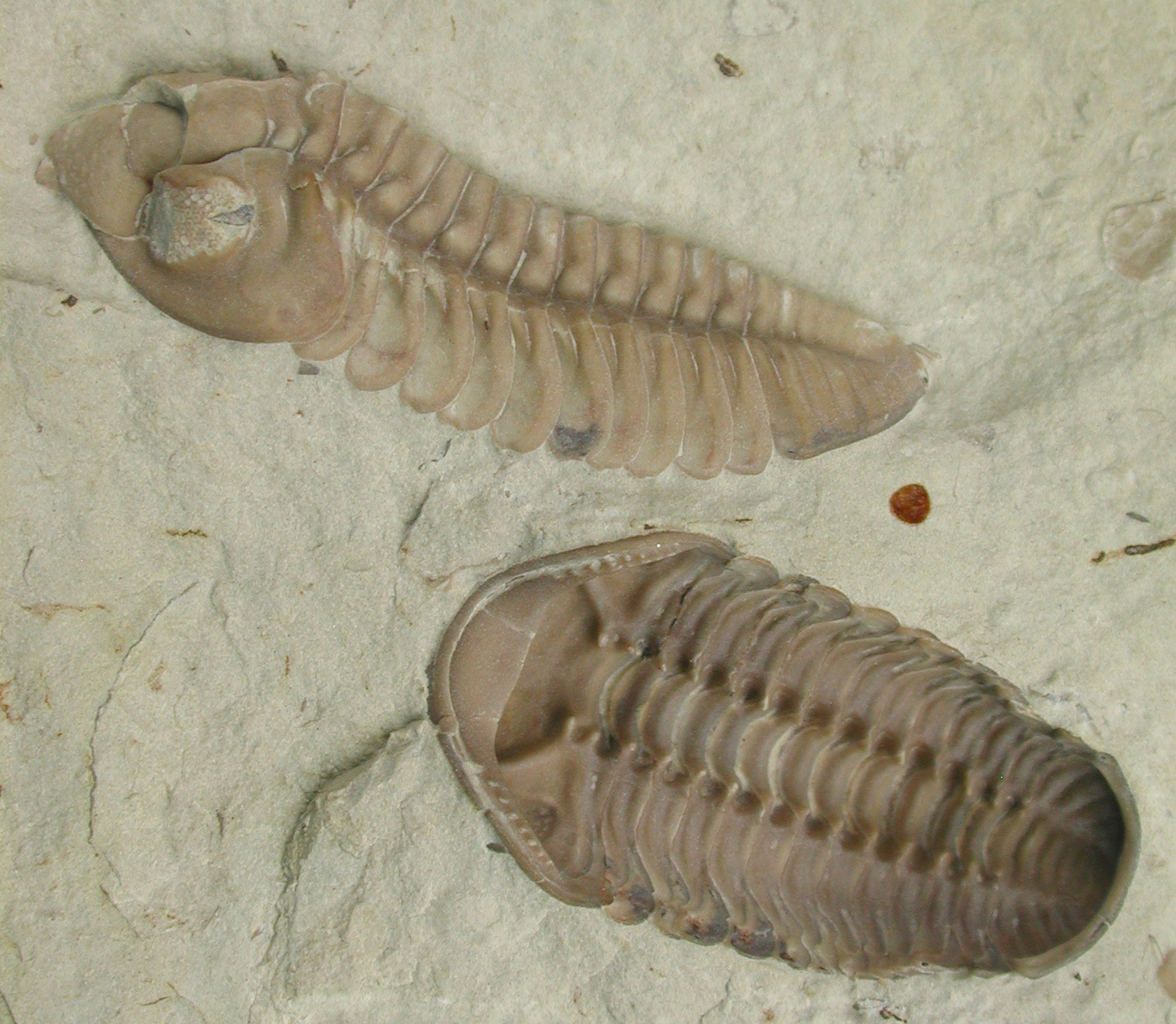
Trilobites were highly successful marine animals through much of the Paleozoic, only to succumb to extinction at the Permian–Triassic extinction event

The End Permian extinction, or the "Great Dying", occurred at the Permian–Triassic transition. It was the Phanerozoic Eon's largest extinction: 53% of marine families died, 84% of marine genera, about 81% of all marine species and an estimated 70% of terrestrial vertebrate species. This is also the largest known extinction event for insects. A highly successful group of marine arthropods, the trilobites, became extinct, alongside dominant coral groups such as rugosans and tabulates. The evidence regarding plants is less clear, but new taxa became dominant after the extinction.

The "Great Dying" had enormous evolutionary significance: on land, it cut short many lineages of synapsids (mammal relatives). The recovery of vertebrates took 30 million years, but the vacant niches created the opportunity for archosaurs (dinosaur and crocodile relatives) to diversify. In the seas, the percentage of animals that were sessile (unable to move about) dropped from 67% to 50%.

The extinction's impact on land ecosystems may have been less severe than once believed. Fossil pollen and spores indicate minimal or short-lived disruption for some plant communities. A 2025 study in present-day China showed a thriving ecosystem just 75,000 years after the event, pointing to faster recovery. Some scientists argue there may have been no mass extinction on land at all, a view supported by findings in plants, insects, and four-limbed vertebrates.

The whole late Permian was a difficult time, at least for marine life, even before the P–T boundary extinction. More recent research has indicated that the End-Capitanian extinction event that preceded the "Great Dying" likely constitutes a separate event from the P–T extinction; if so, it would be larger than some of the "Big Five" extinction events.

=== Triassic–Jurassic extinction event, 201.3 Ma ===
The End Triassic extinction marks the Triassic–Jurassic transition. About 23% of all families, 48% of all genera (20% of marine families and 55% of marine genera) and 70% to 75% of all species became extinct. In the seas, ceratite ammonoids and conodonts died out while reef-builders and other major marine groups were hit hard. Many archosauromorphs, most therapsids, and nearly all of the large temnospondyl amphibians were eliminated, leaving dinosaurs with little terrestrial competition. Pterosaurs and crocodylomorphs were the only other surviving archosaurs, while non-archosaurian diapsids continued to dominate marine environments. A few temnospondyls (such as Koolasuchus) survived as late as the Cretaceous in Australia.

=== Cretaceous–Paleogene extinction event, 66 Ma ===
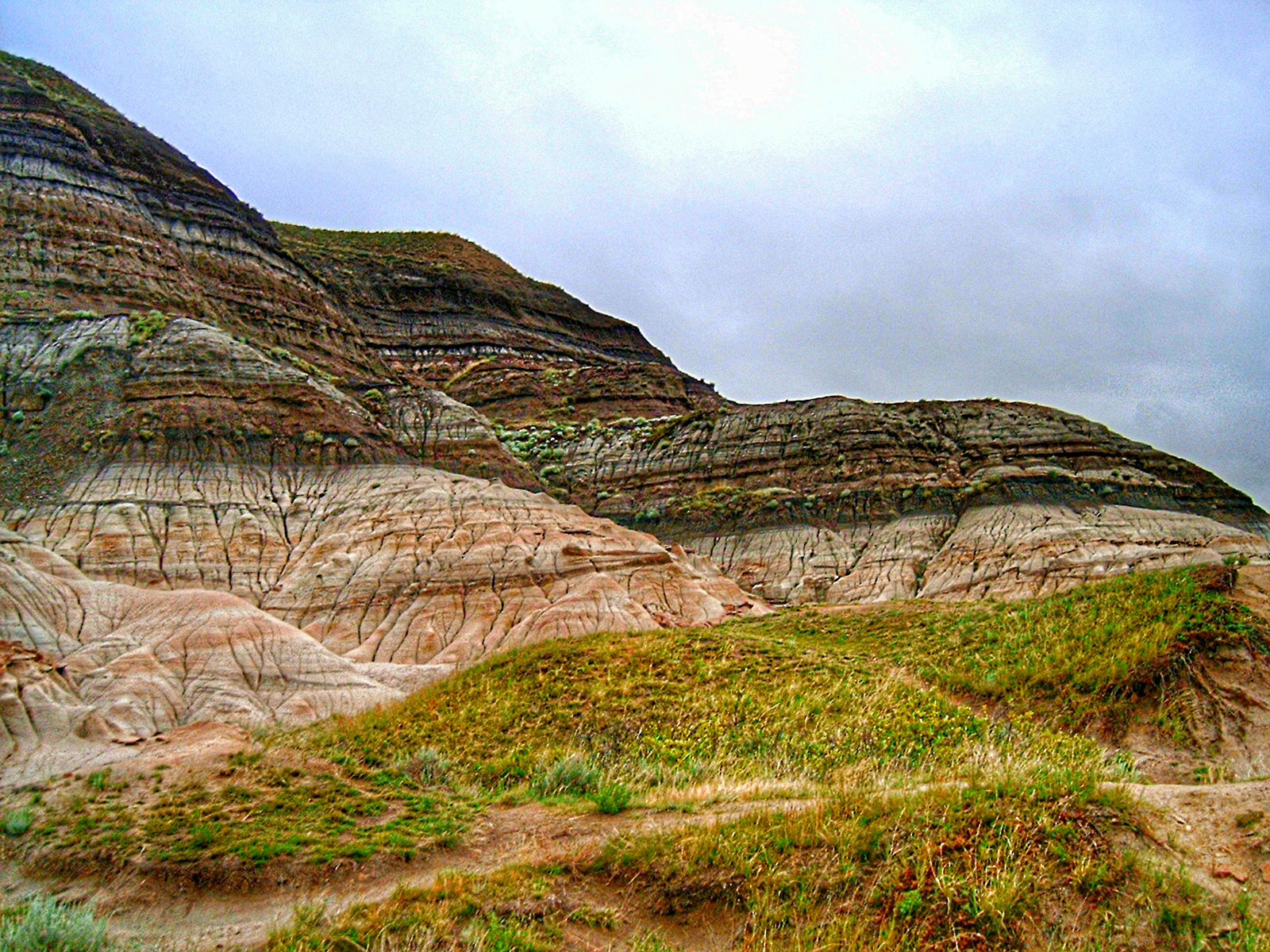
Badlands near Drumheller, Alberta, where erosion has exposed the Cretaceous–Paleogene boundary.

The End Cretaceous extinction, or the K–Pg extinction (formerly K–T extinction), occurred at the Cretaceous (Maastrichtian) – Paleogene (Danian) transition. The event was formerly called the Cretaceous-Tertiary or K–T extinction or K–T boundary; it is now officially named the Cretaceous–Paleogene (or K–Pg) extinction event.

About 17% of all families, 50% of all genera and 75% of all species became extinct. In the seas all the ammonites, plesiosaurs, and mosasaurs disappeared and the percentage of sessile animals was reduced to about 33%. All known non-avian dinosaurs became extinct during that time. The boundary event was severe with a significant amount of variability in the rate of extinction between and among different clades. Mammals, descended from the synapsids, and birds, a side-branch of the theropod dinosaurs, emerged as the two predominant clades of terrestrial tetrapods.

=== Discussion of the five extinction events ===
Declines in the numbers of terrestrial and aquatic genera at times of extinction events.

Despite the common presentation focusing only on these five events, no measure of extinction shows any definite line separating them from the many other Phanerozoic extinction events that appear only slightly lesser catastrophes; further, using different methods of calculating an extinction's impact can lead to other events featuring in the top five.

Fossil records of older events are more difficult to interpret. This is because:

- Older fossils are more difficult to find, as they are usually buried at a considerable depth.
- Dating of older fossils is more difficult.
- Productive fossil beds are researched more than unproductive ones, therefore leaving certain periods unresearched.
- Prehistoric environmental events can disturb the deposition process.
- Marine fossils tend to be better preserved than their more sought-after land-based counterparts, but the deposition and preservation of fossils on land is more erratic.

It has been suggested that the apparent variations in marine biodiversity may actually be an artifact, with abundance estimates directly related to quantity of rock available for sampling from different time periods. However, statistical analysis shows that this can only account for 50% of the observed pattern, and other evidence such as fungal spikes (geologically rapid increase in fungal abundance) provides reassurance that most widely accepted extinction events are real. A quantification of the rock exposure of Western Europe indicates that many of the minor events for which a biological explanation has been sought are most readily explained by sampling bias.

== Sixth mass extinction ==
Research completed after the seminal 1982 paper (Sepkoski and Raup) has concluded that a sixth mass extinction event due to human activities is currently underway.

Extinctions have occurred at over 1,000 times the background extinction rate since 1900, and the rate is increasing. (Note: "Biodiversity is declining faster than at any time in human history. Current extinction rates, for example, are around 100~1,000 times higher than the baseline rate, and they are increasing." — Dasgupta (2021, p. 1)) The mass extinction is a result of human activity (an ecocide) driven by population growth, economic growth, and overconsumption of the Earth's natural resources. (Note: "The ongoing sixth mass extinction may be the most serious environmental threat to the persistence of civilization, because it is irreversible. Thousands of populations of critically endangered vertebrate animal species have been lost in a century, indicating that the sixth mass extinction is human caused and accelerating. The acceleration of the extinction crisis is certain because of the still fast growth in human numbers and consumption rates." — Ceballos, Ehrlich & Raven (2020, p. 13596)) The 2019 global biodiversity assessment by IPBES asserts that out of an estimated 8 million species, 1 million plant and animal species are currently threatened with extinction. The WWF suggested in late 2021 that over a million species could go extinct within a decade in the "largest mass extinction event since the end of the dinosaur age". A 2023 study published in PNAS concluded that at least 73 genera of animals have gone extinct since 1500. If humans had never existed, it would have taken 18,000 years for the same genera to have disappeared naturally, the report states.

Beyond its use for the modern human-caused extinction, the term "sixth mass extinction" has occasionally been used for impactful but overlooked prehistoric extinctions. The Capitanian mass extinction at 260 Ma, which may have reached the same magnitude as the "Big Five", is one example.

== Extinctions by severity ==
Extinction events can be tracked by several methods, including geological change, ecological impact, extinction vs. origination (speciation) rates, and most commonly diversity loss among taxonomic units. Most early papers used families as the unit of taxonomy, based on compendiums of marine animal families by Sepkoski (1982, 1992). Later papers by Sepkoski and other authors switched to genera, which are more precise than families and less prone to taxonomic bias or incomplete sampling relative to species. These are several major papers estimating loss or ecological impact from fifteen commonly-discussed extinction events. Different methods used by these papers are described in the following section. The "Big Five" mass extinctions are bolded.

Extinction proportions (diversity loss) of marine genera or ecological impact in estimates of mass extinction severity
Extinction name	Age (Ma)	Sepkoski (1996) Multiple-interval genera	Bambach (2006)	McGhee et al. (2013)		Stanley (2016)
Extinction name	Age (Ma)	Sepkoski (1996) Multiple-interval genera	Bambach (2006)	Taxonomic loss	Ecological ranking	Stanley (2016)
**Late Ordovician (Ashgillian / Hirnantian)**	445–444	~49%	57%^{[d]} (40%, 31%)^{[e]}	52%	7	42–46%
Lau event (Ludfordian)	424	~23%	–	9%	9	–
Kačák event (Eifelian)	388~	~24%^{[a]}	–	32%	9	–
Taghanic event (Givetian)	384~	~30%^{[a]}	28.5%	36%	8	–
**Late Devonian/Kellwasser event (Frasnian)**	372	~35%	34.7%	40%	4	16–20%
End-Devonian/Hangenberg event (Famennian)	359	~28%^{[a]}	31%	50%	7	<13%^{[f]}
Serpukhovian	330–325~	~23%	31%	39%	6	13–15%
Capitanian	260	~47%^{[b]}	48%	25%	5	33–35%
**Permian–Triassic (Changhsingian)**	252	~58%	55.7%	83%	1	62%
**Triassic–Jurassic (Rhaetian)**	201	~37%^{[c]}	47%^{[c]}	73%	3	N/A^{[g]}
Pliensbachian-Toarcian	186–178	~14%	25%, 20%^{[e]}	–	–	–
End-Jurassic (Tithonian)	145	~18%	20%	–	–	–
Cenomanian-Turonian	94	~15%	25%	–	–	–
**Cretaceous–Paleogene (Maastrichtian)**	66	~39%	40–47%	40%	2	38–40%
Eocene–Oligocene	34	~11%	15.6%	–	–	–

^{a} Graphed but not discussed by Sepkoski (1996), considered continuous with the Late Devonian mass extinction
^{b} At the time considered continuous with the end-Permian mass extinction
^{c} Includes late Norian time slices
^{d} Diversity loss of both pulses calculated together
^{e} Pulses extend over adjacent time slices, calculated separately
^{f} Considered ecologically significant, but not analyzed directly
^{g} Excluded due to a lack of consensus on Late Triassic chronology

== The study of major extinction events ==
=== Breakthrough studies in the 1980s–1990s ===
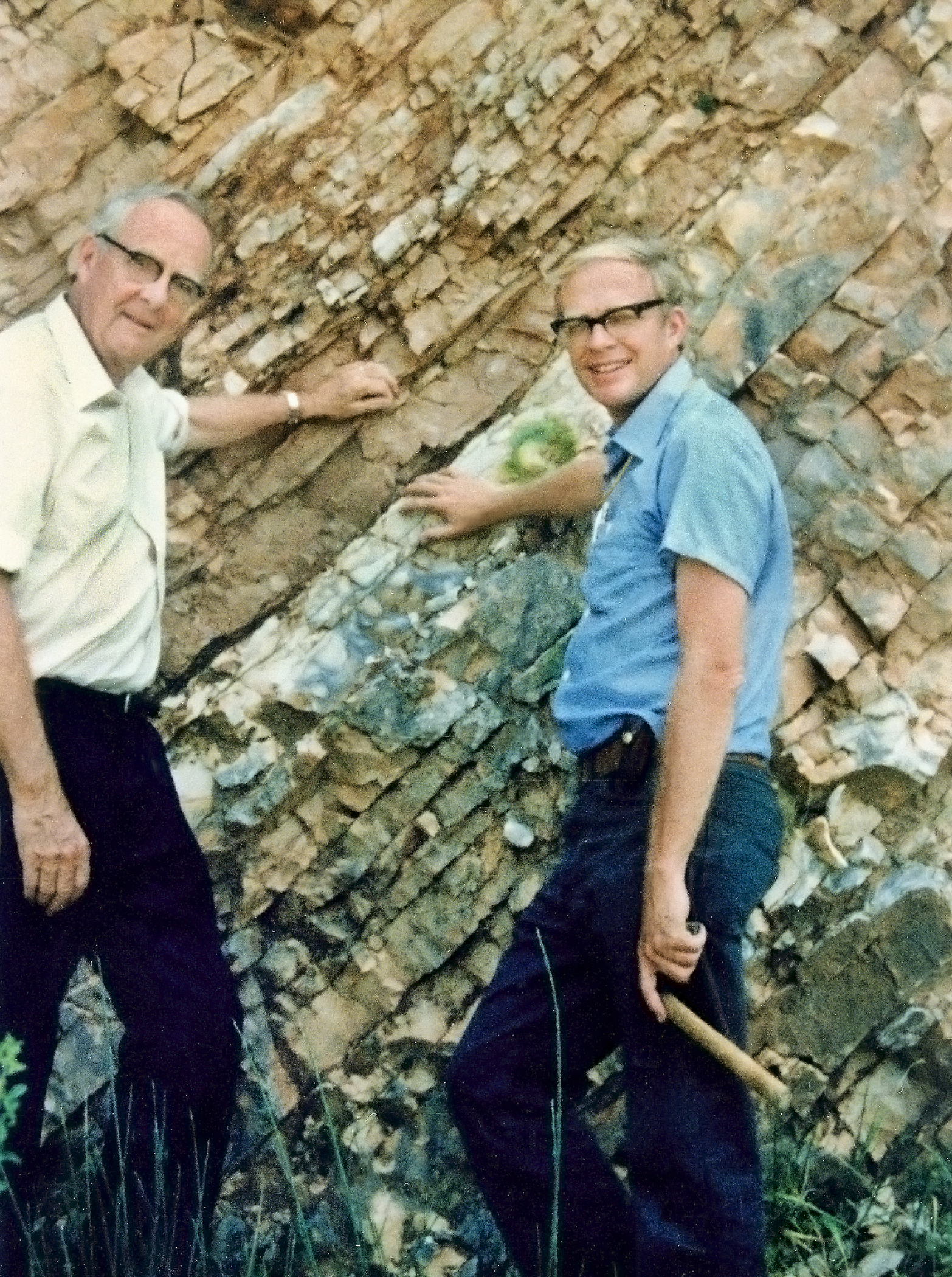
Luis (left) and Walter Alvarez (right) at the K-Pg boundary in Gubbio, Italy in 1981. This team discovered geological evidence for an asteroid impact causing the K-Pg extinction, spurring a wave of public and scientific interest in mass extinctions and their causes

For much of the 20th century, the study of mass extinctions was hampered by insufficient data. Mass extinctions, though acknowledged, were considered mysterious exceptions to the prevailing gradualistic view of prehistory, where slow evolutionary trends define faunal changes. The first breakthrough was published in 1980 by a team led by Luis Alvarez, who discovered trace metal evidence for an asteroid impact at the end of the Cretaceous period. The Alvarez hypothesis for the end-Cretaceous extinction gave mass extinctions, and catastrophic explanations, newfound popular and scientific attention.

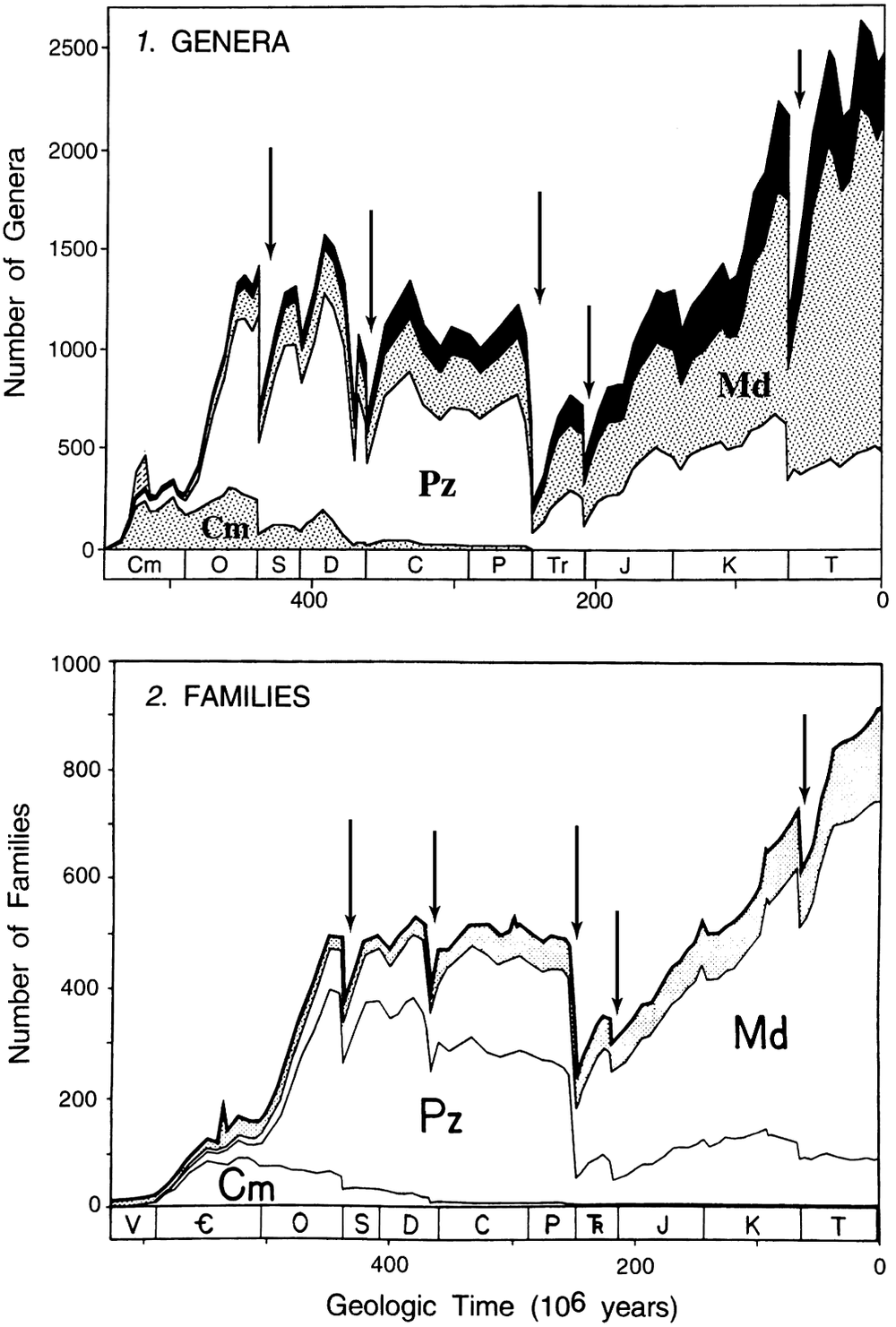
Changes in diversity among genera and families, according to Sepkoski (1997). The "Big Five" mass extinctions are labelled with arrows, and taxa are segregated into Cambrian- (Cm), Paleozoic- (Pz), and Modern- (Md) type faunas.

Another landmark study came in 1982, when a paper written by David M. Raup and Jack Sepkoski was published in the journal Science. This paper, originating from a compendium of extinct marine animal families developed by Sepkoski, identified five peaks of marine family extinctions that stand out among a backdrop of decreasing extinction rates through time. Four of these peaks were statistically significant: the Ashgillian (end-Ordovician), Late Permian, Norian (Late-Triassic extinction), and Maastrichtian (end-Cretaceous). The remaining peak was a broad interval of high extinction smeared over the later half of the Devonian, with its apex in the Frasnian stage.

Through the 1980s, Raup and Sepkoski continued to elaborate and build upon their extinction and origination data, defining a high-resolution biodiversity curve (the "Sepkoski curve") and successive evolutionary faunas with their own patterns of diversification and extinction. Though these interpretations formed a strong basis for subsequent studies of mass extinctions, Raup and Sepkoski also proposed a more controversial idea in 1984: a 26-million-year periodic pattern to mass extinctions. Two teams of astronomers linked this to a hypothetical brown dwarf in the distant reaches of the Solar System, inventing the "Nemesis hypothesis", which has been strongly disputed by other astronomers.

Around the same time, Sepkoski began to devise a compendium of marine animal genera, which would allow researchers to explore extinction at a finer taxonomic resolution. He began to publish preliminary results of this in-progress study as early as 1986, in a paper that identified 29 extinction intervals of note. By 1992, he also updated his 1982 family compendium, finding minimal changes to the diversity curve despite a decade of new data. In 1996, Sepkoski published another paper that tracked marine genera extinction (in terms of net diversity loss) by stage, similar to his previous work on family extinctions. The paper filtered its sample in three ways: all genera (the entire unfiltered sample size), multiple-interval genera (only those found in more than one stage), and "well-preserved" genera (excluding those from groups with poor or understudied fossil records). Diversity trends in marine animal families were also revised based on his 1992 update.

Revived interest in mass extinctions led many other authors to re-evaluate geological events in the context of their effects on life. A 1995 paper by Michael Benton tracked extinction and origination rates among both marine and continental (freshwater & terrestrial) families, identifying 22 extinction intervals and no periodic pattern. Overview books by O.H. Walliser (1996) and A. Hallam and P.B. Wignall (1997) summarized the new extinction research of the previous two decades. One chapter in the former source lists over 60 geological events that could conceivably be considered global extinctions of varying sizes. These texts, and other widely circulated publications in the 1990s, helped to establish the popular image of mass extinctions as a "big five" alongside many smaller extinctions through prehistory.

=== New data on genera: Sepkoski's compendium ===
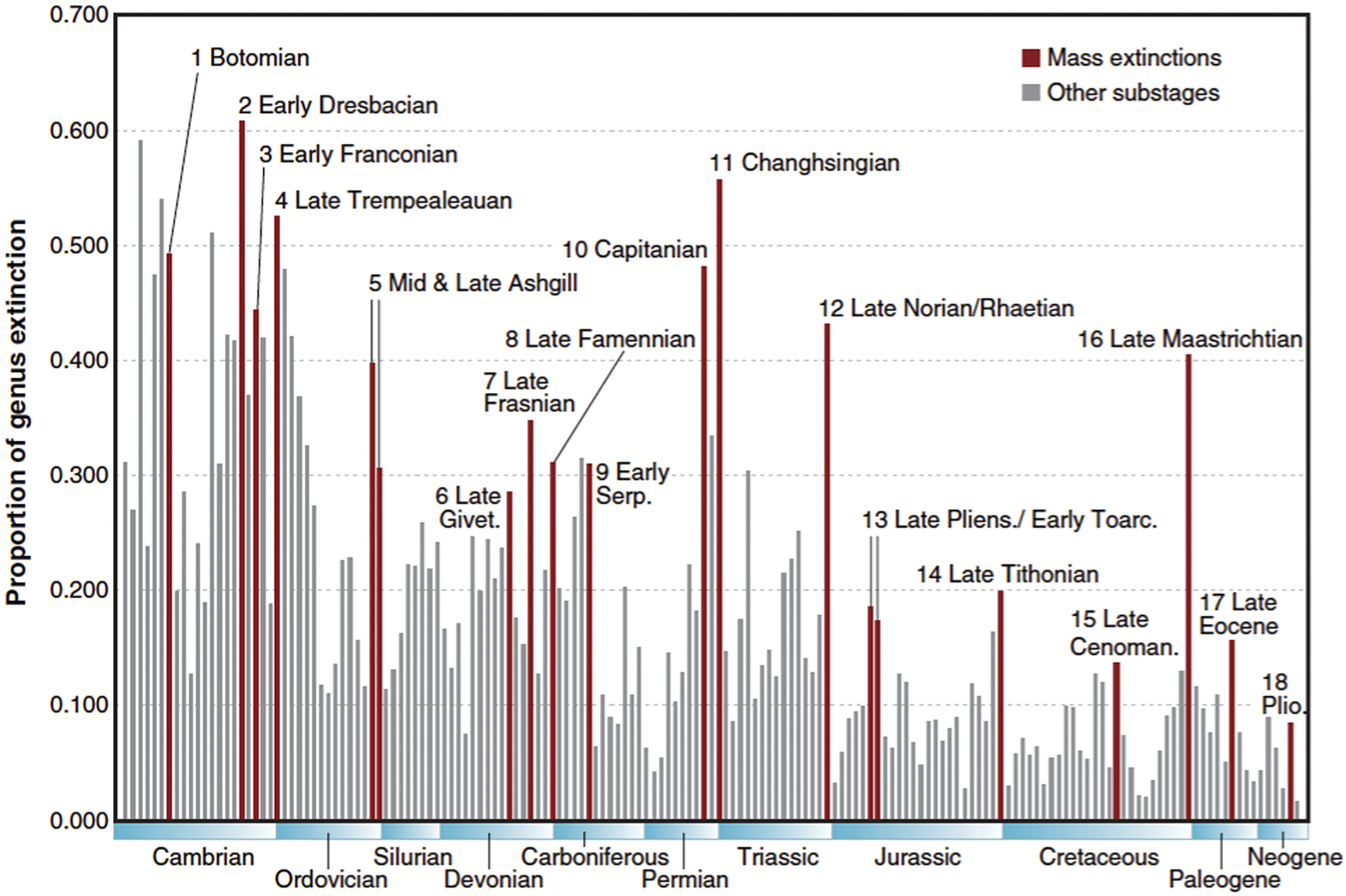
Major Phanerozoic extinctions tracked via proportional genera extinctions by Bambach (2006)

Sepkoski died in 1999, but his marine genera compendium was posthumously published in 2002. This prompted a new wave of studies into the dynamics of mass extinctions. These papers utilized the compendium to track origination rates (Note: The origination rate is the frequency with which new species appear ("speciation") in the fossil record.) parallel to extinction rates in the context of geological stages or substages. A review and re-analysis of Sepkoski's data by Bambach (2006) identified 18 distinct mass extinction intervals, including 4 large extinctions in the Cambrian. These fit Sepkoski's definition of extinction, as short substages with large diversity loss and overall high extinction rates relative to their surroundings.

Bambach, Knoll & Wang (2004) considered each of the "Big Five" extinction intervals to have a different pattern in the relationship between origination and extinction trends. Moreover, background extinction rates were broadly variable and could be separated into more severe and less severe time intervals: Background extinctions were least severe relative to the origination rate in the middle Ordovician – early Silurian, late Carboniferous – Permian, and Jurassic – recent. This argues that the late Ordovician, end-Permian, and end-Cretaceous extinctions were statistically significant outliers in biodiversity trends, while the late Devonian and end Triassic extinctions occurred in time periods that were already stressed by relatively high extinction and low origination.

Computer models run by Foote (2005) determined that abrupt pulses of extinction fit the pattern of prehistoric biodiversity much better than a gradual and continuous background extinction rate with smooth peaks and troughs. This strongly supports the utility of rapid, frequent mass extinctions as a major driver of diversity changes. Pulsed origination events are also supported, though to a lesser degree that is largely dependent on pulsed extinctions.

Similarly, Stanley (2007) used extinction and origination data to investigate turnover rates and extinction responses among different evolutionary faunas and taxonomic groups. In contrast to previous authors, his diversity simulations show support for an overall exponential rate of biodiversity growth through the entire Phanerozoic.

=== Tackling biases in the fossil record ===
An illustration of the Signor-Lipps effect, a geological bias that posits that increased fossil sampling would help to better constrain the exact time when an organism truly goes extinct.

As data continued to accumulate, some authors began to re-evaluate Sepkoski's sample using methods meant to account for sampling biases. As early as 1982, a paper by Phillip W. Signor and Jere H. Lipps noted that the true sharpness of extinctions was diluted by the incompleteness of the fossil record. This phenomenon, later called the Signor-Lipps effect, notes that a species' true extinction must occur after its last fossil, and that origination must occur before its first fossil. Thus, species that appear to die out just prior to an abrupt extinction event may instead be a victim of the event, despite an apparent gradual decline looking at the fossil record alone. A model by Foote (2007) found that many geological stages had artificially inflated extinction rates due to Signor-Lipps "backsmearing" from later stages with extinction events.

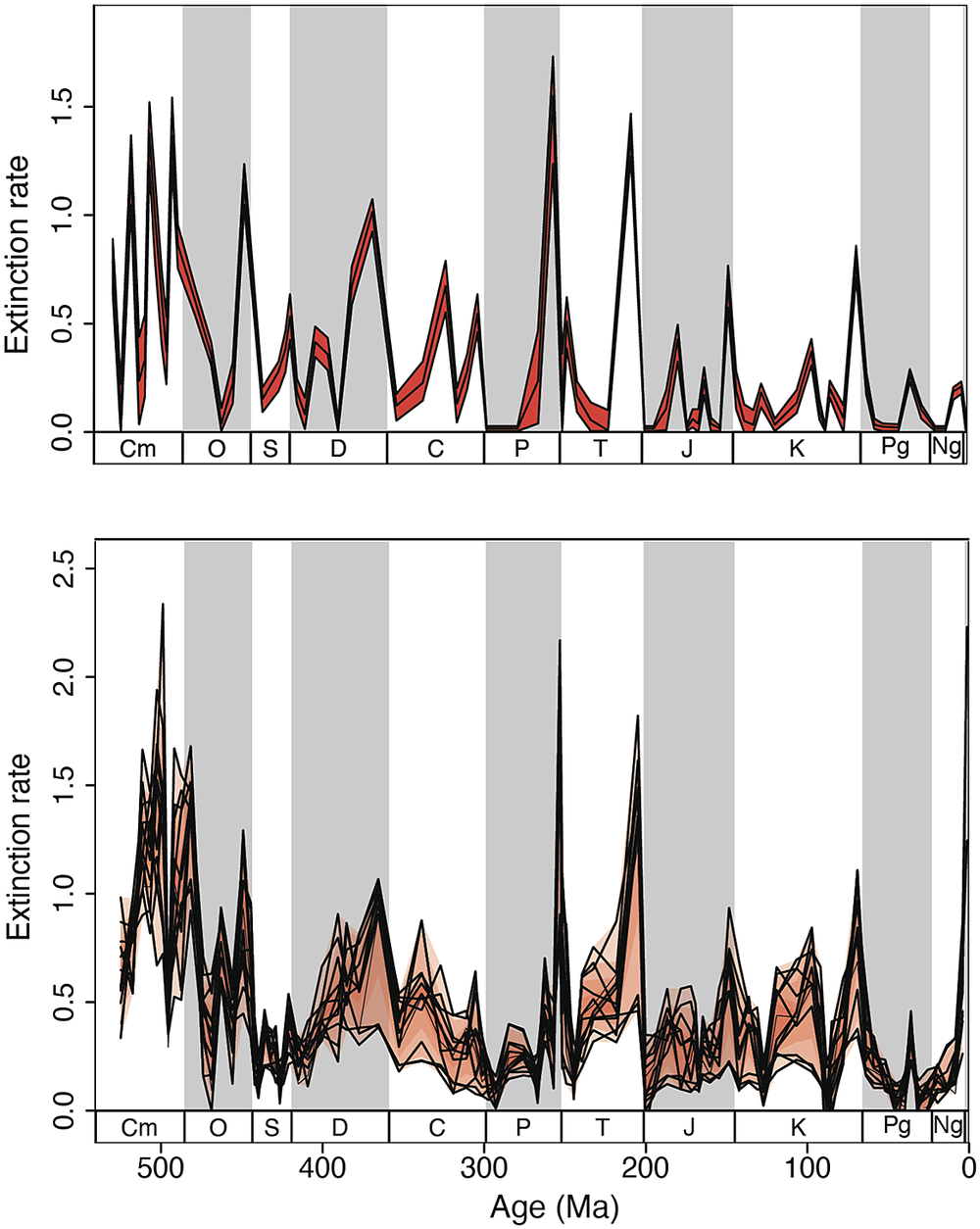
Estimated extinction rates among genera through time. From Foote (2007), top, and Kocsis et al. (2019), bottom

Other biases include the difficulty in assessing taxa with high turnover rates or restricted occurrences, which cannot be directly assessed due to a lack of fine-scale temporal resolution. Many paleontologists opt to assess diversity trends by randomized sampling and rarefaction of fossil abundances rather than raw temporal range data, in order to account for all of these biases. But that solution is influenced by biases related to sample size. One major bias in particular is the "Pull of the recent", the fact that the fossil record (and thus known diversity) generally improves closer to the modern day. This means that biodiversity and abundance for older geological periods may be underestimated from raw data alone.

Alroy (2010) attempted to circumvent sample size-related biases in diversity estimates using a method he called "shareholder quorum subsampling" (SQS). In this method, fossils are sampled from a "collection" (such as a time interval) to assess the relative diversity of that collection. Every time a new species (or other taxon) enters the sample, it brings over all other fossils belonging to that species in the collection (its "share" of the collection). For example, a skewed collection with half its fossils from one species will immediately reach a sample share of 50% if that species is the first to be sampled. This continues, adding up the sample shares until a "coverage" or "quorum" is reached, referring to a pre-set desired sum of share percentages. At that point, the number of species in the sample are counted. A collection with more species is expected to reach a sample quorum with more species, thus accurately comparing the relative diversity change between two collections without relying on the biases inherent to sample size.

Alroy also elaborated on three-timer algorithms, which are meant to counteract biases in estimates of extinction and origination rates. A given taxon is a "three-timer" if it can be found before, after, and within a given time interval, and a "two-timer" if it overlaps with a time interval on one side. Counting "three-timers" and "two-timers" on either end of a time interval, and sampling time intervals in sequence, can together be combined into equations to predict extinction and origination with less bias. In subsequent papers, Alroy continued to refine his equations to improve lingering issues with precision and unusual samples.

McGhee et al. (2013), a paper that primarily focused on ecological effects of mass extinctions, also published new estimates of extinction severity based on Alroy's methods. Many extinctions were significantly more impactful under these new estimates, though some were less prominent.

Stanley (2016) was another paper that attempted to remove two common errors in previous estimates of extinction severity. The first error was the unjustified removal of "singletons", genera unique to only a single time slice. Their removal would mask the influence of groups with high turnover rates or lineages cut short early in their diversification. The second error was the difficulty in distinguishing background extinctions from brief mass extinction events within the same short time interval. To circumvent this issue, background rates of diversity change (extinction/origination) were estimated for stages or substages without mass extinctions, and then assumed to apply to subsequent stages with mass extinctions. For example, the Santonian and Campanian stages were each used to estimate diversity changes in the Maastrichtian prior to the K-Pg mass extinction. Subtracting background extinctions from extinction tallies had the effect of reducing the estimated severity of the six sampled mass extinction events. This effect was stronger for mass extinctions that occurred in periods with high rates of background extinction, like the Devonian.

== Uncertainty in the Proterozoic and earlier eons ==
Because most diversity and biomass on Earth is microbial, and thus difficult to measure via fossils, extinction events placed on-record are those that affect the easily observed, biologically complex component of the biosphere rather than the total diversity and abundance of life. For this reason, well-documented extinction events are confined to the Phanerozoic eon – with the sole exception of the Oxygen Catastrophe in the Proterozoic – since before the Phanerozoic, all living organisms were either microbial, or if multicellular then soft-bodied. Perhaps due to the absence of a robust microbial fossil record, mass extinctions might only seem to be mainly a Phanerozoic phenomenon, with merely the observable extinction rates appearing low before large complex organisms with hard body parts arose.

Extinction occurs at an uneven rate. Based on the fossil record, the background rate of extinctions on Earth is about two to five taxonomic families of marine animals every million years. (Note: Marine fossils are mostly used to measure extinction rates because of their superior fossil record and stratigraphic range compared to land animals.)

The Oxygen Catastrophe, which occurred around 2.45 billion years ago in the Paleoproterozoic, is plausible as the first-ever major extinction event. It was perhaps also the worst-ever, in some sense, but with the Earth's ecology just before that time so poorly understood, and the concept of prokaryote genera so different from genera of complex life, that it would be difficult to meaningfully compare it to any of the "Big Five" even if Paleoproterozoic life were better known.

== Evolutionary importance ==
Life timeline
← / Earth formed; ← / Earliest water; ← / LUCA; ← / Earliest fossils; ← / Great Oxygenation Event; ← / Sexual reproduction; ← / Earliest fungi; ← / Neoproterozoic oxygenation event; ← / Ediacaran biota; ← / Cambrian explosion; ← / Earliest tetrapods; ← / Earliest hominoid
(million years ago)

Mass extinctions have sometimes accelerated the evolution of life on Earth. When dominance of particular ecological niches passes from one group of organisms to another, it is rarely because the newly dominant group is "superior" to the old but usually because an extinction event eliminates the old, dominant group and makes way for the new one, a process known as adaptive radiation.

For example, mammaliaformes ("almost mammals") and then mammals existed throughout the reign of the dinosaurs, but could not compete in the large terrestrial vertebrate niches that dinosaurs monopolized. The end-Cretaceous mass extinction removed the non-avian dinosaurs and made it possible for mammals to expand into the large terrestrial vertebrate niches. The dinosaurs themselves had been beneficiaries of a previous mass extinction, the end-Triassic, which eliminated most of their chief rivals, the crurotarsans. Similarly, within Synapsida, the replacement of taxa that originated in the earliest, Pennsylvanian and Cisuralian evolutionary radiation (often still called "pelycosaurs", though this is a paraphyletic group) by therapsids occurred around the Kungurian/Roadian transition, which is often called Olson's extinction (which may be a slow decline over 20 Ma rather than a dramatic, brief event).

Another point of view put forward in the Escalation hypothesis predicts that species in ecological niches with more organism-to-organism conflict will be less likely to survive extinctions. This is because the very traits that keep a species numerous and viable under fairly static conditions become a burden once population levels fall among competing organisms during the dynamics of an extinction event.

Furthermore, many groups that survive mass extinctions do not recover in numbers or diversity, and many of these go into long-term decline, and these are often referred to as "Dead Clades Walking". However, clades that survive for a considerable period of time after a mass extinction, and that were reduced to only a few species, are likely to have experienced a rebound effect called the "push of the past".

Darwin was firmly of the opinion that biotic interactions, such as competition for food and space – the 'struggle for existence' – were of considerably greater importance in promoting evolution and extinction than changes in the physical environment. He expressed this in The Origin of Species:

"Species are produced and exterminated by slowly acting causes ... and the most import of all causes of organic change is one which is almost independent of altered ... physical conditions, namely the mutual relation of organism to organism – the improvement of one organism entailing the improvement or extermination of others".

== Patterns in frequency ==
Various authors have suggested that extinction events occurred periodically, every 26 to 30 million years, or that diversity fluctuates episodically about every 62 million years. Various ideas, mostly regarding astronomical influences, attempt to explain the supposed pattern, including the presence of a hypothetical companion star to the Sun, oscillations in the galactic plane, or passage through the Milky Way's spiral arms. However, other authors have concluded that the data on marine mass extinctions do not fit with the idea that mass extinctions are periodic, or that ecosystems gradually build up to a point at which a mass extinction is inevitable. Many of the proposed correlations have been argued to be spurious or lacking statistical significance. Others have argued that there is strong evidence supporting periodicity in a variety of records, and additional evidence in the form of coincident periodic variation in nonbiological geochemical variables such as Strontium isotopes, flood basalts, anoxic events, orogenies, and evaporite deposition. One explanation for this proposed cycle is carbon storage and release by oceanic crust, which exchanges carbon between the atmosphere and mantle.

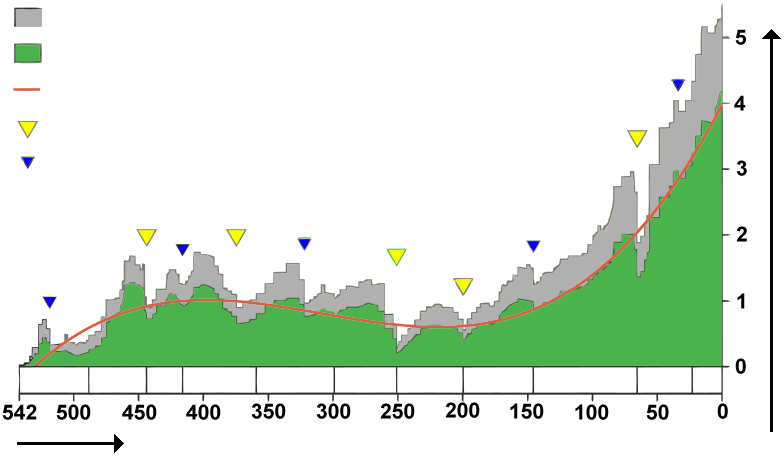
Phanerozoic biodiversity as shown by the fossil record

Mass extinctions are thought to result when a long-term stress is compounded by a short-term shock. Over the course of the Phanerozoic, individual taxa appear to have become less likely to suffer extinction, which may reflect more robust food webs, as well as fewer extinction-prone species, and other factors such as continental distribution. However, even after accounting for sampling bias, there does appear to be a gradual decrease in extinction and origination rates during the Phanerozoic. This may represent the fact that groups with higher turnover rates are more likely to become extinct by chance; or it may be an artefact of taxonomy: families tend to become more speciose, therefore less prone to extinction, over time; and larger taxonomic groups (by definition) appear earlier in geological time.

It has also been suggested that the oceans have gradually become more hospitable to life over the last 500 million years, and thus less vulnerable to mass extinctions, (Note: Dissolved oxygen became more widespread and penetrated to greater depths; the development of life on land reduced the run-off of nutrients and hence the risk of eutrophication and anoxic events; and marine ecosystems became more diversified so that food chains were less likely to be disrupted.) but susceptibility to extinction at a taxonomic level does not appear to make mass extinctions either more or less probable.

== Causes ==
There is still debate about the causes of all mass extinctions. In general, large extinctions may result when a biosphere under long-term stress undergoes a short-term shock. An underlying mechanism appears to be present in the correlation of extinction and origination rates to diversity. High diversity leads to a persistent increase in extinction rate; low diversity to a persistent increase in origination rate. These presumably ecologically controlled relationships likely amplify smaller perturbations (asteroid impacts, etc.) to produce the global effects observed.

=== Identifying causes of specific mass extinctions ===
A good theory for a particular mass extinction should:

- explain all of the losses, not just focus on a few groups (such as dinosaurs);
- explain why particular groups of organisms died out and why others survived;
- provide mechanisms that are strong enough to cause a mass extinction but not a total extinction;
- be based on events or processes that can be shown to have happened, not just inferred from the extinction.

It may be necessary to consider combinations of causes. For example, the marine aspect of the end-Cretaceous extinction appears to have been caused by several processes that partially overlapped in time and may have had different levels of significance in different parts of the world.

Arens and West (2006) proposed a "press / pulse" model in which mass extinctions generally require two types of cause: long-term pressure on the eco-system ("press") and a sudden catastrophe ("pulse") towards the end of the period of pressure. Their statistical analysis of marine extinction rates throughout the Phanerozoic suggested that neither long-term pressure alone nor a catastrophe alone was sufficient to cause a significant increase in the extinction rate.

=== Most widely supported explanations ===
MacLeod (2001) summarized the relationship between mass extinctions and events that are most often cited as causes of mass extinctions, using data from Courtillot, Jaeger & Yang et al. (1996), Hallam (1992) and Grieve & Pesonen (1992):

- Flood basalt events (giant volcanic eruptions): 11 occurrences, all associated with significant extinctions. (Note: The earliest known flood basalt event is the one that produced the Siberian Traps and is associated with the end-Permian extinction.) (Note: Some of the extinctions associated with flood basalts and sea-level falls were significantly smaller than the "major" extinctions, but still much greater than the background extinction level.) But Wignall (2001) concluded that only five of the major extinctions coincided with flood basalt eruptions and that the main phase of extinctions started before the eruptions.
- Sea-level falls: 12, of which seven were associated with significant extinctions.
- Asteroid impacts: one large impact is associated with a mass extinction, that is, the Cretaceous–Paleogene extinction event; there have been many smaller impacts but they are not associated with significant extinctions, or cannot be dated precisely enough. The impact that created the Siljan Ring either was just before the Late Devonian Extinction or coincided with it.

The most commonly suggested causes of mass extinctions are listed below.

==== Flood basalt events ====
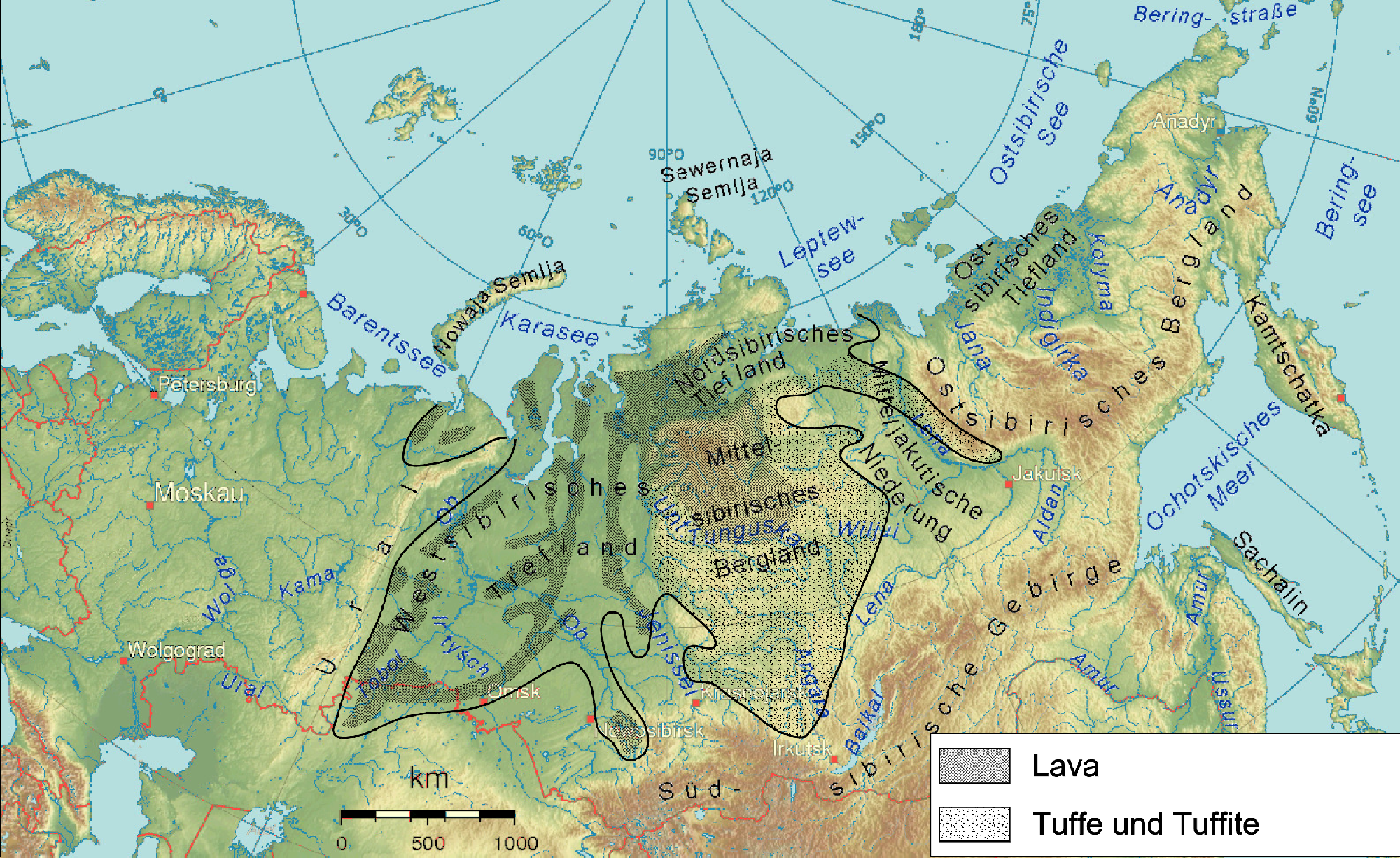
The scientific consensus is that the main cause of the End-Permian extinction event was the large amount of carbon dioxide emitted by the volcanic eruptions that created the Siberian Traps, which elevated global temperatures.

The formation of large igneous provinces by flood basalt events could have:

- produced dust and particulate aerosols, which inhibited photosynthesis and thus caused food chains to collapse both on land and at sea
- emitted sulfur oxides that were precipitated as acid rain and poisoned many organisms, contributing further to the collapse of food chains
- emitted carbon dioxide and thus possibly causing sustained global warming once the dust and particulate aerosols dissipated.

Flood basalt events occur as pulses of activity punctuated by dormant periods. As a result, they are likely to cause the climate to oscillate between cooling and warming, but with an overall trend towards warming as the carbon dioxide they emit can stay in the atmosphere for hundreds of years.

Flood basalt events have been implicated as the cause of many major extinction events. It is speculated that massive volcanism caused or contributed to the Kellwasser Event, the End-Guadalupian Extinction Event, the End-Permian Extinction Event, the Smithian-Spathian Extinction, the Triassic-Jurassic Extinction Event, the Toarcian Oceanic Anoxic Event, the Cenomanian-Turonian Oceanic Anoxic Event, also known as Bonarelli Event, the Cretaceous-Palaeogene Extinction Event, and the Palaeocene-Eocene Thermal Maximum. The correlation between gigantic volcanic events expressed in the large igneous provinces and mass extinctions was shown for the last 260 million years. Recently such possible correlation was extended across the whole Phanerozoic Eon.

==== Sea-level fall ====
These are often clearly marked by worldwide sequences of contemporaneous sediments that show all or part of a transition from sea-bed to tidal zone to beach to dry land – and where there is no evidence that the rocks in the relevant areas were raised by geological processes such as orogeny. Sea-level falls could reduce the continental shelf area (the most productive part of the oceans) sufficiently to cause a marine mass extinction, and could disrupt weather patterns enough to cause extinctions on land. But sea-level falls are very probably the result of other events, such as sustained global cooling or the sinking of the mid-ocean ridges.

Sea-level falls are associated with most of the mass extinctions, including all of the "Big Five"—End-Ordovician, Late Devonian, End-Permian, End-Triassic, and End-Cretaceous, along with the more recently recognised Capitanian mass extinction of comparable severity to the Big Five.

A 2008 study, published in the journal Nature, established a relationship between the speed of mass extinction events and changes in sea level and sediment. The study suggests changes in ocean environments related to sea level exert a driving influence on rates of extinction, and generally determine the composition of life in the oceans.

==== Extraterrestrial threats ====
===== Impact events =====
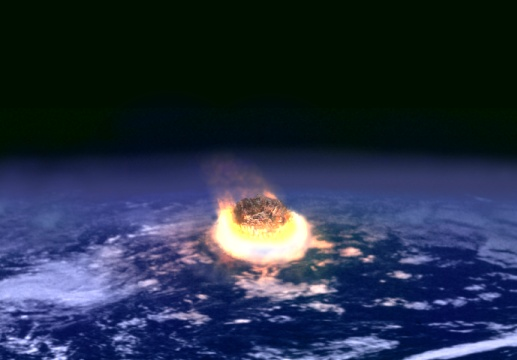
An artist's rendering of an asteroid a few kilometers across colliding with the Earth. Such an impact can release the equivalent energy of several million nuclear weapons detonating simultaneously.

The impact of a sufficiently large asteroid or comet could have caused food chains to collapse both on land and at sea by producing dust and particulate aerosols and thus inhibiting photosynthesis. Impacts on sulfur-rich rocks could have emitted sulfur oxides precipitating as poisonous acid rain, contributing further to the collapse of food chains. Such impacts could also have caused megatsunamis and/or global forest fires.

Most paleontologists now agree that an asteroid did hit the Earth about 66 Ma, but there is lingering dispute whether the impact was the sole cause of the Cretaceous–Paleogene extinction event. Nonetheless, in October 2019, researchers reported that the Cretaceous Chicxulub asteroid impact that resulted in the extinction of non-avian dinosaurs 66 Ma, also rapidly acidified the oceans, producing ecological collapse and long-lasting effects on the climate, and was a key reason for end-Cretaceous mass extinction.

The Permian-Triassic extinction event has also been hypothesised to have been caused by an asteroid impact that formed the Araguainha crater due to the estimated date of the crater's formation overlapping with the end-Permian extinction event. However, this hypothesis has been widely challenged, with the impact hypothesis being rejected by most researchers.

According to the Shiva hypothesis, the Earth is subject to increased asteroid impacts about once every 27 million years because of the Sun's passage through the plane of the Milky Way galaxy, thus causing extinction events at 27 million year intervals. Some evidence for this hypothesis has emerged in both marine and non-marine contexts. Alternatively, the Sun's passage through the higher density spiral arms of the galaxy could coincide with mass extinction on Earth, perhaps due to increased impact events. However, a reanalysis of the effects of the Sun's transit through the spiral structure based on maps of the spiral structure of the Milky Way in CO molecular line emission has failed to find a correlation.

==== A nearby nova, supernova or gamma ray burst ====
A nearby gamma-ray burst (less than 6000 light-years away) would be powerful enough to destroy the Earth's ozone layer, leaving organisms vulnerable to ultraviolet radiation from the Sun. Gamma ray bursts are fairly rare, occurring only a few times in a given galaxy per million years. It has been suggested that a gamma ray burst caused the End-Ordovician extinction, while a supernova has been proposed as the cause of the Hangenberg event. A supernova within 25 light-years would strip Earth of its atmosphere. Today, there is no star capable to produce a supernova dangerous to life on Earth within the Solar System's neighbourhood .

==== Global cooling ====
Sustained and significant global cooling could kill many polar and temperate species and force others to migrate towards the equator; reduce the area available for tropical species; often make the Earth's climate more arid on average, mainly by locking up more of the planet's water in ice and snow. The glaciation cycles of the current ice age are believed to have had only a very mild impact on biodiversity, so the mere existence of a significant cooling is not sufficient on its own to explain a mass extinction.

It has been suggested that global cooling caused or contributed to the End-Ordovician, Permian–Triassic, Late Devonian extinctions, and possibly others. Sustained global cooling is distinguished from the temporary climatic effects of flood basalt events or impacts.

==== Global warming ====
This would have the opposite effects: expand the area available for tropical species; kill temperate species or force them to migrate towards the poles; possibly cause severe extinctions of polar species; often make the Earth's climate wetter on average, mainly by melting ice and snow and thus increasing the volume of the water cycle. It might also cause anoxic events in the oceans (see below).

Global warming as a cause of mass extinction is supported by several recent studies.

The most dramatic example of sustained warming is the Paleocene–Eocene Thermal Maximum, which was associated with one of the smaller mass extinctions. It has also been suggested to have caused the Triassic–Jurassic extinction event, during which 20% of all marine families became extinct. Furthermore, the Permian–Triassic extinction event has been suggested to have been caused by warming.

===== Clathrate gun hypothesis =====
Clathrates are composites in which a lattice of one substance forms a cage around another. Methane clathrates (in which water molecules are the cage) form on continental shelves. These clathrates are likely to break up rapidly and release the methane if the temperature rises quickly or the pressure on them drops quickly – for example in response to sudden global warming or a sudden drop in sea level or even earthquakes. Methane is a much more powerful greenhouse gas than carbon dioxide, so a methane eruption ("clathrate gun") could cause rapid global warming or make it much more severe if the eruption was itself caused by global warming.

The most likely signature of such a methane eruption would be a sudden decrease in the ratio of carbon-13 to carbon-12 in sediments, since methane clathrates are low in carbon-13; but the change would have to be very large, as other events can also reduce the percentage of carbon-13.

It has been suggested that "clathrate gun" methane eruptions were involved in the end-Permian extinction ("the Great Dying") and in the Paleocene–Eocene Thermal Maximum, which was associated with one of the smaller mass extinctions.

==== Anoxic events ====
Anoxic events are situations in which the middle and even the upper layers of the ocean become deficient or totally lacking in oxygen. Their causes are complex and controversial, but all known instances are associated with severe and sustained global warming, mostly caused by sustained massive volcanism.

It has been suggested that anoxic events caused or contributed to the Ordovician–Silurian, late Devonian, Capitanian, Permian–Triassic, and Triassic–Jurassic extinctions, as well as a number of lesser extinctions (such as the Ireviken, Lundgreni, Mulde, Lau, Smithian-Spathian, Toarcian, and Cenomanian–Turonian events). On the other hand, there are widespread black shale beds from the mid-Cretaceous that indicate anoxic events but are not associated with mass extinctions.

The bio-availability of essential trace elements (in particular selenium) to potentially lethal lows has been shown to coincide with, and likely have contributed to, at least three mass extinction events in the oceans, that is, at the end of the Ordovician, during the Middle and Late Devonian, and at the end of the Triassic. During periods of low oxygen concentrations very soluble selenate (Se^{6+}) is converted into much less soluble selenide (Se^{2-}), elemental Se and organo-selenium complexes. Bio-availability of selenium during these extinction events dropped to about 1% of the current oceanic concentration, a level that has been proven lethal to many extant organisms.

British oceanologist and atmospheric scientist Andrew Watson explained that, while the Holocene epoch exhibits many processes reminiscent of those that have contributed to past anoxic events, full-scale ocean anoxia would take "thousands of years to develop".

==== Hydrogen sulfide emissions from the seas ====
Kump, Pavlov and Arthur (2005) have proposed that during the Permian–Triassic extinction event the warming also upset the oceanic balance between photosynthesising plankton and deep-water sulfate-reducing bacteria, causing massive emissions of hydrogen sulfide, which poisoned life on both land and sea and severely weakened the ozone layer, exposing much of the life that still remained to fatal levels of UV radiation.

==== Oceanic overturn ====
Oceanic overturn is a disruption of thermo-haline circulation that lets surface water (which is more saline than deep water because of evaporation) sink straight down, bringing anoxic deep water to the surface and therefore killing most of the oxygen-breathing organisms that inhabit the surface and middle depths. It may occur either at the beginning or the end of a glaciation, although an overturn at the start of a glaciation is more dangerous because the preceding warm period will have created a larger volume of anoxic water.

Unlike other oceanic catastrophes such as regressions (sea-level falls) and anoxic events, overturns do not leave easily identified "signatures" in rocks and are theoretical consequences of researchers' conclusions about other climatic and marine events.

It has been suggested that oceanic overturn caused or contributed to the late Devonian and Permian–Triassic extinctions.

==== Geomagnetic reversal ====
One theory is that periods of increased geomagnetic reversals will weaken Earth's magnetic field long enough to expose the atmosphere to the solar winds, causing oxygen ions to escape the atmosphere in a rate increased by 3–4 orders, resulting in a disastrous decrease in oxygen.

==== Plate tectonics ====
Movement of the continents into some configurations can cause or contribute to extinctions in several ways: by initiating or ending ice ages; by changing ocean and wind currents and thus altering climate; by opening seaways or land bridges that expose previously isolated species to competition for which they are poorly adapted (for example, the extinction of most of South America's native ungulates and all of its large metatherians after the creation of a land bridge between North and South America). Occasionally continental drift creates a super-continent that includes the vast majority of Earth's land area, which in addition to the effects listed above is likely to reduce the total area of continental shelf (the most species-rich part of the ocean) and produce a vast, arid continental interior that may have extreme seasonal variations.

Another theory is that the creation of the super-continent Pangaea contributed to the End-Permian mass extinction. Pangaea was almost fully formed at the transition from mid-Permian to late-Permian, and the "Marine genus diversity" diagram at the top of this article shows a level of extinction starting at that time, which might have qualified for inclusion in the "Big Five" if it were not overshadowed by the "Great Dying" at the end of the Permian.

==== Human activities ====
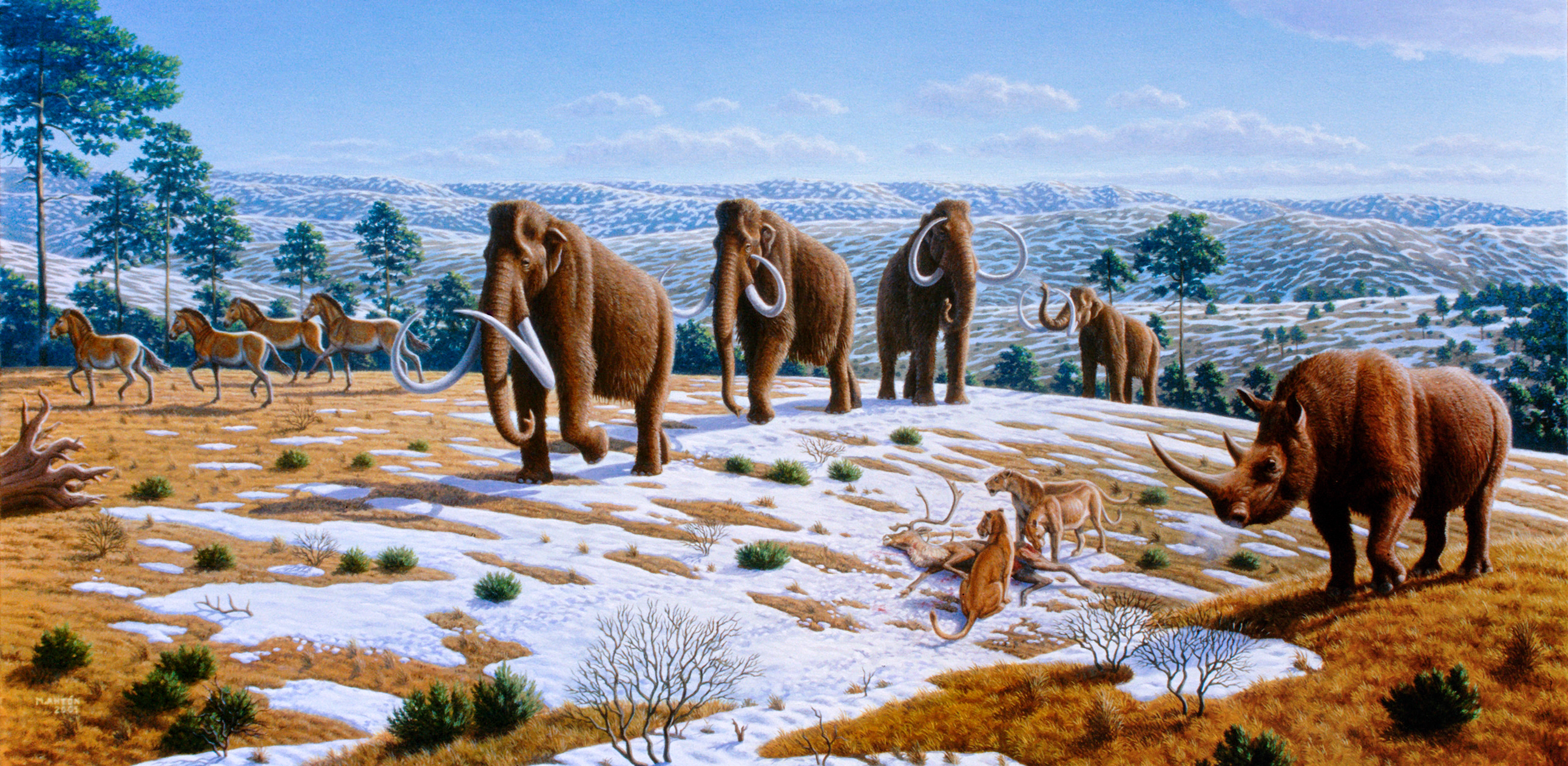
The Late Pleistocene saw extinctions of numerous predominantly megafaunal species, coinciding in time with the early human migrations across continents.

Scientists have been concerned that human activities could cause more plants and animals to become extinct than any point in the past. Along with human-made changes in climate (see above), some of these extinctions could be caused by overhunting, overfishing, invasive species, or habitat loss. A study published in May 2017 in Proceedings of the National Academy of Sciences argued that a "biological annihilation" akin to a sixth mass extinction event is underway as a result of anthropogenic causes, such as over-population and over-consumption. The study suggested that as much as 50% of the number of animal individuals that once lived on Earth were already extinct, threatening the basis for human existence too.

==== Other hypotheses ====
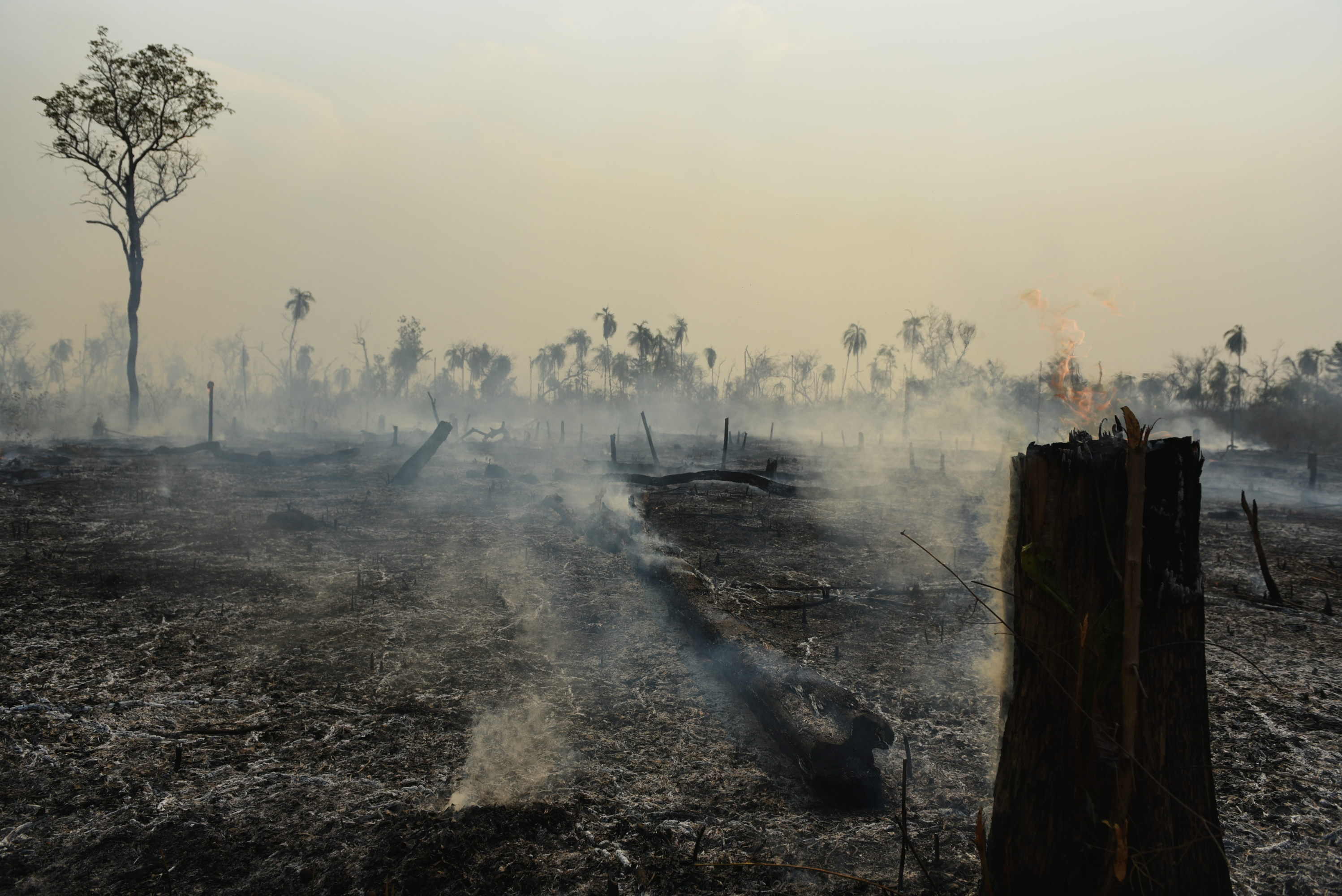
Many species of plants and animals are at high risk of extinction due to the destruction of the Amazon rainforest

Many other hypotheses have been proposed, such as the spread of a new disease, or simple out-competition following an especially successful biological innovation. But all have been rejected, usually for one of the following reasons: they require events or processes for which there is no evidence; they assume mechanisms that are contrary to the available evidence; they are based on other theories that have been rejected or superseded.

==== Future biosphere extinction/sterilization ====
The eventual warming and expanding of the Sun, combined with the eventual decline of atmospheric carbon dioxide, could actually cause an even greater mass extinction, having the potential to wipe out even microbes (in other words, the Earth would be completely sterilized): rising global temperatures caused by the expanding Sun would gradually increase the rate of weathering, which would in turn remove more and more CO_{2} from the atmosphere. When CO_{2} levels get too low (perhaps at 50 ppm), most plant life will die out, although simpler plants like grasses and mosses can survive much longer, until CO_{2} levels drop to 10 ppm.

With all photosynthetic organisms gone, atmospheric oxygen can no longer be replenished, and it is eventually removed by chemical reactions in the atmosphere, perhaps from volcanic eruptions. Eventually the loss of oxygen will cause all remaining aerobic life to die out via asphyxiation, leaving behind only simple anaerobic prokaryotes. When the Sun becomes 10% brighter in about a billion years, Earth will suffer a moist greenhouse effect resulting in its oceans boiling away, while the Earth's liquid outer core cools due to the inner core's expansion and causes the Earth's magnetic field to shut down. In the absence of a magnetic field, charged particles from the Sun will deplete the atmosphere and further increase the Earth's temperature to an average of around 420 K (147 °C, 296 °F) in 2.8 billion years, causing the last remaining life on Earth to die out. This is the most extreme instance of a climate-caused extinction event. Since this will only happen late in the Sun's life, it would represent the final mass extinction in Earth's history (albeit a very long extinction event).

== Effects and recovery ==
The effects of mass extinction events varied widely. After a major extinction event, usually only weedy species survive due to their ability to live in diverse habitats. Later, species diversify and occupy empty niches. Generally, it takes millions of years for biodiversity to recover after extinction events. In the most severe mass extinctions it may take 15 to 30 million years.

The worst Phanerozoic event, the Permian–Triassic extinction, devastated life on Earth, killing over 90% of species. Life seemed to recover quickly after the P-T extinction, but this was mostly in the form of disaster taxa, such as the hardy Lystrosaurus. The most recent research indicates that the specialized animals that formed complex ecosystems, with high biodiversity, complex food webs and a variety of niches, took much longer to recover. It is thought that this long recovery was due to successive waves of extinction that inhibited recovery, as well as prolonged environmental stress that continued into the Early Triassic. Recent research indicates that recovery did not begin until the start of the mid-Triassic, four to six million years after the extinction; and some writers estimate that the recovery was not complete until 30 million years after the P-T extinction, that is, in the late Triassic. Subsequent to the P-T extinction, there was an increase in provincialization, with species occupying smaller ranges – perhaps removing incumbents from niches and setting the stage for an eventual rediversification.

The effects of mass extinctions on plants are somewhat harder to quantify, given the biases inherent in the plant fossil record. Some mass extinctions (such as the end-Permian) were equally catastrophic for plants, whereas others, such as the end-Devonian, did not affect the flora.

== In media ==
The term extinction-level event (ELE) has been used in media. The 1998 film Deep Impact describes a potential comet strike of Earth as an ELE.

== See also ==
- Bioevent
- Elvis taxon
- Endangered species
- Geologic time scale
- Global catastrophic risk
- Holocene extinction
- Human extinction
- Kačák Event
- Lazarus taxon
- List of impact structures on Earth
- List of largest volcanic eruptions
- List of possible impact structures on Earth
- Medea hypothesis
- Rare species
- Signor–Lipps effect
- Snowball Earth
- Speculative evolution
- The Sixth Extinction: An Unnatural History (nonfiction book)
- Timeline of extinctions in the Holocene
- Late Pleistocene extinctions
