= Tyche (hypothetical planet) =

Hypothetical gas giant in the Oort cloud

An artist's rendering of the Oort cloud and the Kuiper belt (inset)

Tyche (/ˈtaɪki/) was a hypothetical gas giant located in the Solar System's Oort cloud, first proposed in 1999 by astrophysicists John Matese, Patrick Whitman and Daniel Whitmire of the University of Louisiana at Lafayette. They argued that evidence of Tyche's existence could be seen in a supposed bias in the points of origin for long-period comets. More recently, Matese and Whitmire re-evaluated the comet data and noted that Tyche, if it existed, would be detectable in the archive of data that was collected by NASA's Wide-field Infrared Survey Explorer (WISE) telescope. In 2014, NASA announced that the WISE survey had ruled out any object with Tyche's characteristics, indicating that Tyche as hypothesized by Matese, Whitman, and Whitmire does not exist.

== History ==
Matese, Whitmire and their colleague Patrick Whitman first proposed the existence of this planet in 1999, based on observations of the orbits of long-period comets. Most astronomers agree that long-period comets (those with orbits of thousands to millions of years) have a roughly isotropic distribution; that is, they arrive at random from every point in the sky. Because comets are volatile and dissipate over time, astronomers suspect that they must be held in a spherical cloud tens of thousands of AU distant (known as the Oort cloud) for most of their existence. However, Matese and Whitmire claimed that rather than arriving from random points across the sky as is commonly thought, comet orbits were in fact clustered in a band inclined to the orbital plane of the planets. Such clustering could be explained if they were disturbed by an unseen object at least as large as Jupiter, possibly a brown dwarf, located in the outer part of the Oort cloud. They also suggested that such an object might explain the trans-Neptunian object Sedna's peculiar orbit. However, the sample size of Oort comets was small and the results were inconclusive.

== Orbit ==
Whitmire and Matese speculated that Tyche's orbit would lie at approximately 500 times Neptune's distance, some 15,000 AU (2.2×10^{12} km) from the Sun, a little less than one quarter of a light year. This is well within the Oort cloud, whose boundary is estimated to be beyond 50,000 AU. It would have an orbital period of roughly 1.8 million years. A failed search of older IRAS data suggests that an object of 5 M_{J} would need to have a distance greater than 10,000 AU. Such a planet would orbit in a plane different from the ecliptic, and would probably have been in a wide-binary orbit at the time of its formation. Wide binaries may form through capture during the dissolution of a star's birth cluster.

== Mass ==
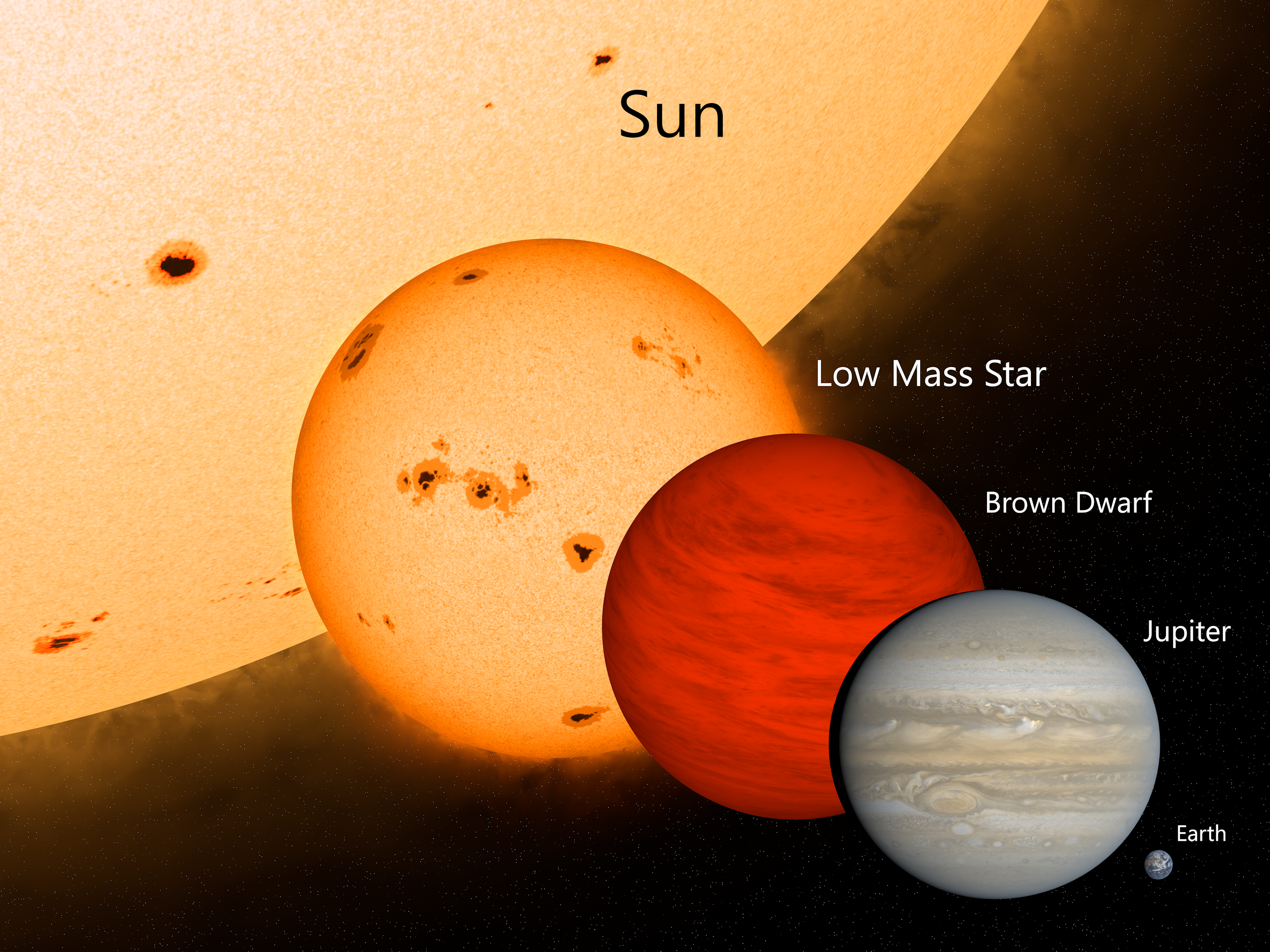
General size comparison between the Sun, a low-mass star, a brown dwarf, and the planets Jupiter and Earth

In 2011, Whitmire and Matese speculated that the hypothesized planet could be up to four times the mass of Jupiter and have a relatively high temperature of approximately 200 K (−73 °C; −100 °F), due to residual heat from its formation and Kelvin–Helmholtz heating. It would be insufficiently massive to undergo nuclear fusion reactions in its interior, a process that occurs in objects above roughly 13 Jupiter masses. Although more massive than Jupiter, Tyche would be about Jupiter's size since degenerate pressure causes massive gas giants to increase only in density, not in size, relative to their mass. (Note: A cold hydrogen-rich gas giant slightly more massive than Jupiter (below about 1.6 M_{J}) would be larger in volume than Jupiter, but for higher masses, degenerate pressure will cause the planet to shrink, and added mass is compensated for by increasing degeneracy pressure in the planetary core. For example, HD 17156 b is 3 M_{J} with a radius of 96% of Jupiter and HD 80606 b is 4 M_{J} with a radius of 92% of Jupiter. Even the brown dwarf COROT-3b (22 M_{J}) is estimated to be about the volume of Jupiter. After 10 billion years of cooling, large gas giants are all very nearly Jupiter's radius, but more massive objects are slightly smaller.) If Tyche was to be found, it was expected to be found by the end of 2013 and only be 1–2 Jupiter masses.

== Origin of name ==
Tyche (τύχη, meaning "fortune" or "luck" in Greek) was the Greek goddess of fortune and prosperity. The name was chosen to avoid confusion with an earlier similar hypothesis that the Sun has a dim companion named Nemesis, whose gravity triggers influxes of comets into the inner Solar System, leading to mass-extinctions on Earth. Tyche was the name of the "good sister" of Nemesis. This name was first used for an outer Oort cloud object by J. Davy Kirkpatrick at the Infrared Processing and Analysis Center of the California Institute of Technology.

== WISE mission ==
The Wide-field Infrared Survey Explorer (WISE) space telescope has completed an all-sky infrared survey that includes areas where Whitmire and Matese anticipate that Tyche may be found. On March 14, 2012, the first-pass all-sky survey catalog of the WISE mission was released. The co-added (AllWISE) post-cryo second survey of the sky was released at the end of 2013. On March 7, 2014, NASA reported that the WISE telescope had ruled out the possibility of a Saturn-sized object out to 10,000—28,000 AU, and a Jupiter-sized or larger object out to 26,000—82,000 AU (0.4 light-years).

== See also ==
- Kelvin–Helmholtz heating
- Nemesis (hypothetical star)
- Planet Nine
- Planets beyond Neptune
- Vulcan (hypothetical planet)
