= C/2017 T2 (PanSTARRS) =

Oort cloud comet

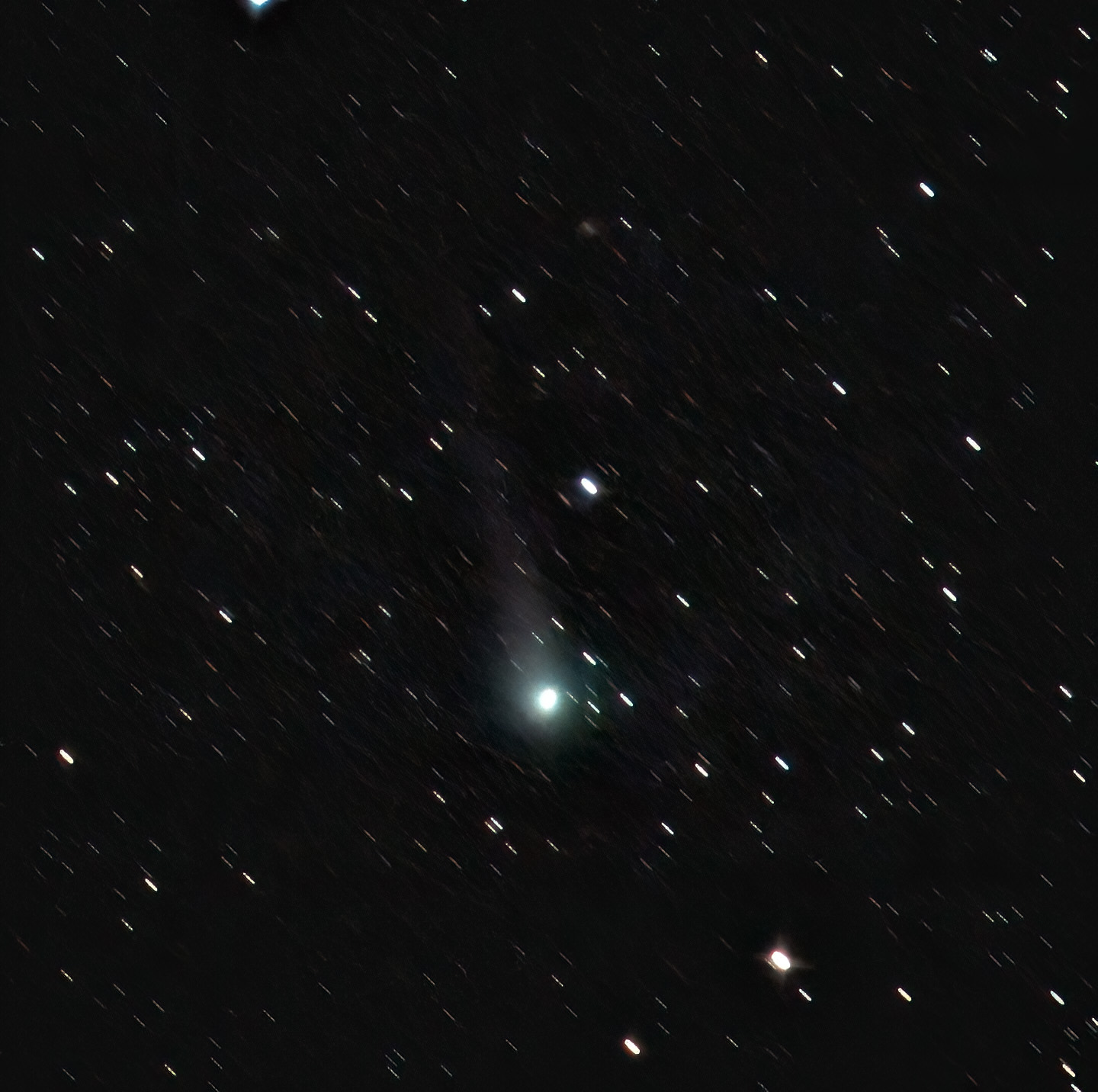

Discovery
- Discovered by: Pan-STARRS
- Discovery date: 2 October 2017

Orbital characteristics
- Epoch: 2458756.5 (30 Sept 2019)
- Observation arc: 3.93 years
- Number of observations: 6896
- Orbit type: Oort cloud
- Aphelion: ~74000 AU (inbound); ~3000 AU (outbound)
- Perihelion: 1.6150 AU
- Eccentricity: 0.99971
- Orbital period: ~7 million years (inbound); ~55000 years (outbound)
- Inclination: 57.232°
- Last perihelion: 4 May 2020
- Earth MOID: 1.2 AU (180 million km; 470 LD)
- Jupiter MOID: 0.99 AU (148 million km; 390 LD)

Physical characteristics
- Dimensions: 1.0–1.8 km (0.62–1.12 mi)
- Mean diameter: 1.4 km (0.87 mi)
- Synodic rotation period: 26.96±0.04 days
- Spectral type: (V–R) = 0.0042±0.0021
- Comet total magnitude (M1): 10.2

C/2017 T2 (PanSTARRS) is an Oort cloud comet discovered on 2 October 2017 when it was 9.2 AU (1.38 billion km) from the Sun. The closest approach to Earth was on 28 December 2019 at a distance of 1.52 AU (227 million km). It came to perihelion (closest approach to the Sun) on 4 May 2020 when it was safe from disintegration at 1.6 AU from the Sun. (Mars is also roughly 1.6 AU from the Sun.)

== Observational history ==
Comet C/2017 T2 (PanSTARRS) brightened to apparent magnitude 8 and was visible with 50mm binoculars. On 22-24 May 2020, the comet passed near the galaxy pair of Messier 81 and Messier 82, passing less than one degree from the latter. In early June 2020 the comet was near the magnitude 1.8 star Dubhe in Ursa Major.

Based on the light curve of the comet nucleus, it has been estimated that the nucleus has a rotational period of 5.6759 ± 0.0046 h. The comet at perihelion had a water production of 6×10^{28} molecules/s. Also when observed in CN featured two side jets in June 2020, but they weren't observed one month later. Concentric structures were observed in the inner coma in May 2020, probably created by a jet with rotation axis towards the Earth.

JPL Horizons using an epoch 1950 orbit solution models that C/2017 T2 took millions of years to come from the Oort cloud at a distance of roughly 74,000 AU (1.2 ly).

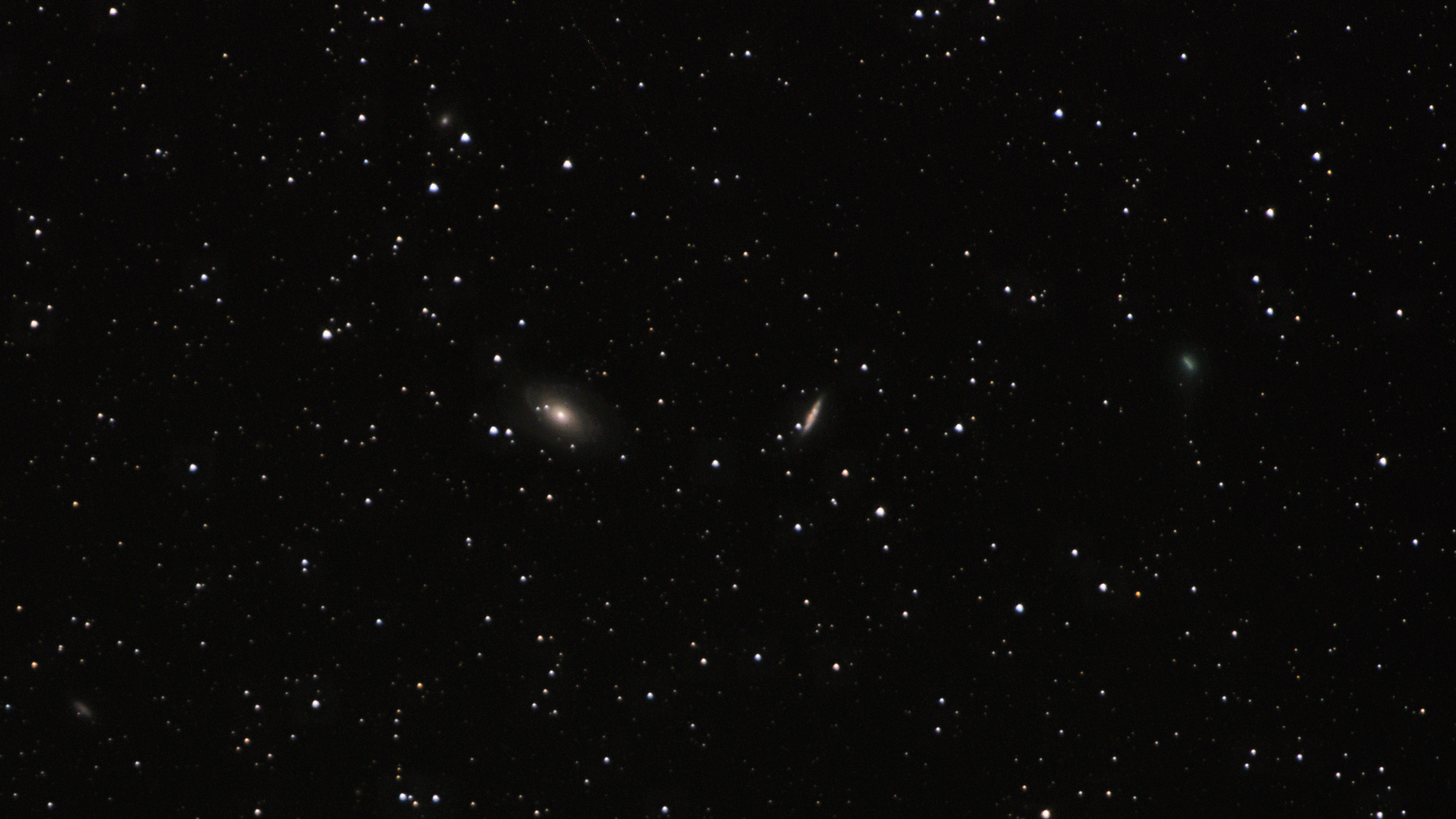
C/2017 T2 (right) passing near Messier 81 and Messier 82 on May 22, 2020

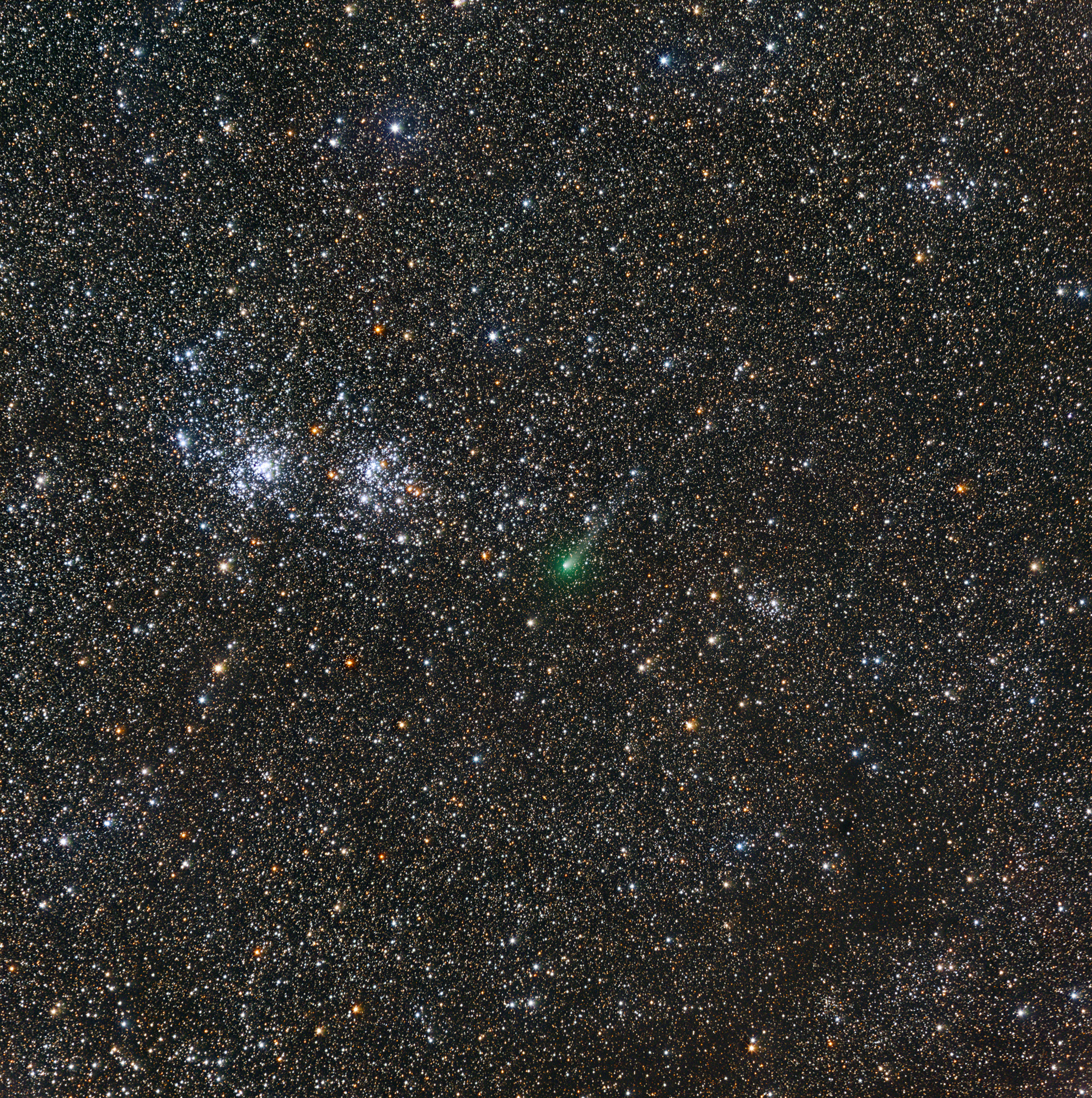
C/2017 T2 (centre) passing near the Double Cluster on January 23, 2020
