= Nemesis (hypothetical star) =

Hypothetical star orbiting the Sun, supposedly responsible for extinction events

Nemesis is a hypothetical red dwarf or brown dwarf, originally postulated in 1984 to be orbiting the Sun at a distance of about 95,000 AU (1.5 light-years), somewhat beyond the Oort cloud, to explain a perceived cycle of mass extinctions in the geological record, which seem to occur more often at intervals of 26 million years. In a 2017 paper, Sarah Sadavoy and Steven Stahler argued that the Sun was probably part of a binary system at the time of its formation, leading them to suggest "there probably was a Nemesis, a long time ago". Such a star would have separated from this binary system over four billion years ago, meaning it could not be responsible for the more recent cycles of mass extinctions.

More recent theories suggest that other forces, like close passage of other stars, or the angular effect of the galactic gravity plane working against the outer solar orbital plane (Shiva hypothesis), may be the cause of orbital perturbations of some outer Solar System objects. In 2010, researchers found evidence in the fossil record confirming the extinction event periodicity originally identified in 1984, but at a higher confidence level and over a time period nearly twice as long. However, in 2011, researchers analyzed the ages of known craters on Earth's surface and found strong evidence against periodic impacts, concluding that the earlier findings based on small samples were statistical artifacts. The Infrared Astronomical Satellite (IRAS) failed to discover Nemesis in the 1980s. The 2MASS astronomical survey, which ran from 1997 to 2001, failed to detect an additional star or brown dwarf in the Solar System.

Using newer and more powerful infrared telescope technology able to detect brown dwarfs with temperatures as low as 150 K, out to a distance of 10 light-years from the Sun, the Wide-field Infrared Survey Explorer (WISE survey) has not detected Nemesis. In 2011, David Morrison, a senior scientist at NASA known for his work in risk assessment of near Earth objects, has written that there is no confidence in the existence of an object like Nemesis, since it should have been detected in infrared sky surveys.

== Claimed periodicity of mass extinctions ==
In 1977, Alfred G. Fischer and Michael A. Arthur first suggested a periodicity in life proliferation in pelagic environments, based on fossil records. They believed that the periodicity was driven by a terrestrial mechanism led by climate and oceanic circulation, without proposing an extraterrestrial cause.

In 1984, paleontologists David Raup and Jack Sepkoski published a paper claiming that they had identified a statistical periodicity in extinction rates over the last 250 million years using various forms of time series analysis. They focused on the extinction intensity of fossil families of marine vertebrates, invertebrates, and protozoans, identifying 12 extinction events over the time period in question. The average time interval between extinction events was determined as 26 million years. At the time, two of the identified extinction events (Cretaceous–Paleogene and Eocene–Oligocene) could be shown to coincide with large impact events. Although Raup and Sepkoski could not identify the cause of their supposed periodicity, they suggested a possible non-terrestrial connection. The challenge to propose a mechanism was quickly addressed by several teams of astronomers.

In 2010, Melott & Bambach re-examined the fossil data, including the now-improved dating, and using a second independent database in addition to that Raup & Sepkoski had used. They found evidence for a signal showing an excess extinction rate with a 27-million-year periodicity, now going back 500 million years, and at a much higher statistical significance than in the older work.

At any rate, the periodicity of extinction events is still debated in the paleontological community. For example, some recent works claimed that the periodicity is not statistically relevant.

== Development of the Nemesis hypotheses ==
Two teams of astronomers, Daniel P. Whitmire and Albert A. Jackson IV, and Marc Davis, Piet Hut, and Richard A. Muller, independently published similar hypotheses to explain Raup and Sepkoski's extinction periodicity in the same issue of the journal Nature. This hypothesis proposes that the Sun may have an undetected companion star in a highly elliptical orbit that periodically disturbs comets in the Oort cloud, causing a large increase of the number of comets visiting the inner Solar System with a consequential increase of impact events on Earth. This became known as the "Nemesis" or "Death Star" hypothesis.

If it does exist, the exact nature of Nemesis is uncertain. Muller suggests that the most likely object is a red dwarf with an apparent magnitude between 7 and 12, while Daniel P. Whitmire and Albert A. Jackson argue for a brown dwarf. If a red dwarf, it would exist in star catalogs, but it would only be confirmed by measuring its parallax; due to orbiting the Sun it would have a low proper motion and would escape detection by older proper motion surveys that have found stars like the 9th-magnitude Barnard's Star. (The proper motion of Barnard's Star was detected in 1916.) Muller expects Nemesis to be discovered by the time parallax surveys reach the 10th magnitude.

As of 2012, more than 1800 brown dwarfs have been identified. There are actually fewer brown dwarfs in our cosmic neighborhood than previously thought. Rather than one star for every brown dwarf, there may be as many as six stars for every brown dwarf. The majority of solar-type stars are single. The previous idea stated half or perhaps most stellar systems were binary, triple, or multiple-star systems associated with clusters of stars, rather than the single-star systems that tend to be seen most often.

Muller, referring to the date of a recent extinction at 11 million years before the present day, posits that Nemesis has a semi-major axis of about 1.5 light-years (95,000 AU) and suggests it is located (supported by Yarris, 1987) near Hydra, based on a hypothetical orbit derived from original aphelia of a number of atypical long-period comets that describe an orbital arc meeting the specifications of Muller's hypothesis. Richard Muller's most recent paper relevant to the Nemesis theory was published in 2002. In 2002, Muller speculated that Nemesis was perturbed 400 million years ago by a passing star from a circular orbit into an orbit with an eccentricity of 0.7.

In 2010, and again in 2013, Melott & Bambach found evidence for a signal showing an excess extinction rate with a 27-million-year periodicity. However, because Nemesis is so distant from the Sun, it is expected to be subject to perturbations by passing stars, and therefore its orbital period should shift by 15–30%. The existence of a sharp 27-million year peak in extinction events is therefore inconsistent with Nemesis.

== Orbit of Sedna ==
Sedna orbit compared to the Solar System and Oort cloud

The trans-Neptunian object Sedna has an extra-long and unusual elliptical orbit around the Sun, ranging between 76 and 937 AU. Sedna's orbit takes about 11,400 years to complete once. Its discoverer, Michael Brown of Caltech, noted in a Discover magazine article that Sedna's location seemed to defy reasoning: "Sedna shouldn't be there", Brown said. "There's no way to put Sedna where it is. It never comes close enough to be affected by the Sun, but it never goes far enough away from the Sun to be affected by other stars." Brown has stated that it is more likely that one or more non-companion stars, passing near the Sun billions of years ago, could have pulled Sedna out into its current orbit. In 2004, Kenyon forwarded this explanation after analysis of Sedna's orbital data and computer modeling of possible ancient non-companion star passes.

As an alternative hypothesis, John Matese and Daniel Whitmire proposed the existence of a trans-Neptunian planet named Tyche (the mythological sister of Nemesis) to explain the features of the orbit of Sedna. Tyche should be a gas giant with 3–4 Jupiter masses. In 2016, studying the orbit of Sedna and of 14 other extreme trans-Neptunian objects, Michael Brown and Konstantin Batygin postulated that a big super-Earth named Planet Nine would explain their peculiar features, but this hypothesis is not strictly related to that of the Nemesis star.

== Past, current, and pending searches for Nemesis ==
Searches for Nemesis in the infrared are important because cooler stars comparatively shine brighter in infrared light. The University of California's Leuschner Observatory failed to discover Nemesis by 1986. The Infrared Astronomical Satellite (IRAS) failed to discover Nemesis in the 1980s. The 2MASS astronomical survey, which ran from 1997 to 2001, failed to detect a star, or brown dwarf, in the Solar System. If Nemesis exists, it may be detected by Pan-STARRS or the planned LSST astronomical surveys.

In particular, if Nemesis is a red dwarf or a brown dwarf, the WISE mission (an infrared sky survey that covered most of the solar neighborhood in movement-verifying parallax measurements) was expected to be able to find it. WISE can detect 150-kelvin brown dwarfs out to 10 light-years, and the closer a brown dwarf is, the easier it is to detect. Preliminary results of the WISE survey were released on April 14, 2011. On March 14, 2012, the entire catalog of the WISE mission was released. In 2014, WISE data ruled out a Saturn or larger-sized body in the Oort cloud out to ten thousand AU.

Calculations in the 1980s suggested that a Nemesis object would have an irregular orbit due to perturbations from the galaxy and passing stars. The Melott and Bambach work shows an extremely regular signal, inconsistent with the expected irregularities in such an orbit. Thus, while supporting the extinction periodicity, it appears to be inconsistent with the Nemesis hypothesis, though of course not inconsistent with other kinds of substellar objects. According to a 2011 NASA news release, "recent scientific analysis no longer supports the idea that extinctions on Earth happen at regular, repeating intervals, and thus, the Nemesis hypothesis is no longer needed."

== See also ==
- Counter-Earth
- Giant-impact hypothesis
- Lists of astronomical objects
- Nemesis (Asimov novel)
- Malmquist bias
- Planet X
- Planets beyond Neptune
- Shiva hypothesis
- Theia (hypothetical planet)
- Tyche (hypothetical planet)
- Vulcan (hypothetical planet)
