= Oort cloud =

Distant planetesimals in the Solar System

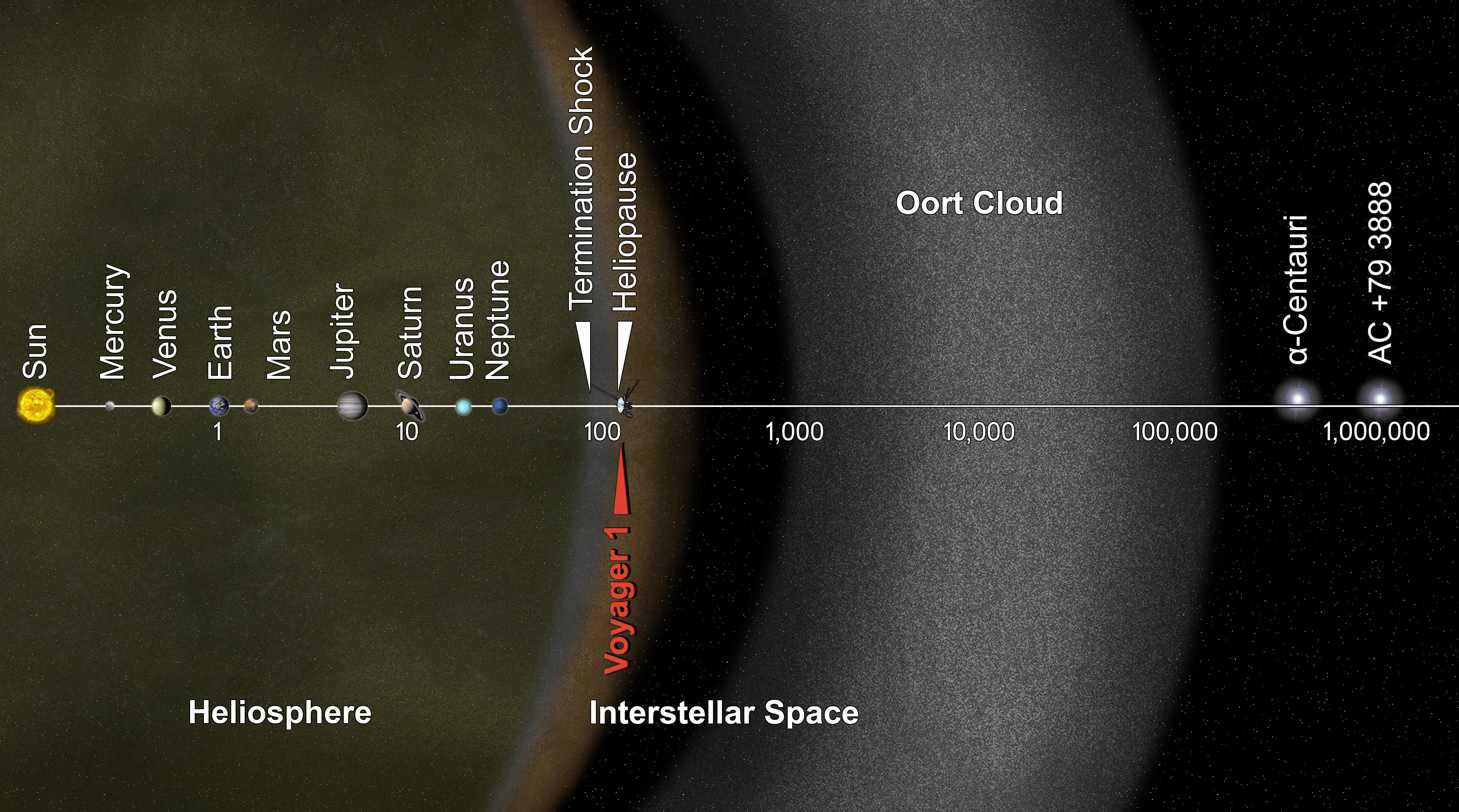
The distance from the Oort cloud to the interior of the Solar System, and two of the nearest stars, is measured in astronomical units. The scale is logarithmic: each indicated distance is ten times as far out as the previous distance. The red arrow indicates the projected location, in 2025–2027, of the space probe Voyager 1, which may reach the Oort cloud about 300 years later.

An artist's impression of the Oort cloud and the Kuiper belt (inset); the sizes of objects are over-scaled for visibility.

The Oort cloud (pronounced /ɔːrt/ ORT or /ʊərt/ OORT), sometimes called the Öpik–Oort cloud, is theorized to be a cloud of billions of icy planetesimals surrounding the Sun at distances ranging from 2,000 to 200,000 AU (0.03 to 3.2 light-years). Its existence was proposed in 1950 by the Dutch astronomer Jan Oort, in whose honor the idea was later named. Oort proposed that the bodies in this cloud replenish and keep constant the number of long-period comets entering the inner Solar System—where they are eventually consumed and destroyed during close approaches to the Sun.

The cloud is thought to encompass two regions: a disc-shaped inner Oort cloud approximately aligned with the solar ecliptic (also called its Hills cloud) and a spherical outer Oort cloud. The innermost portion of the Oort cloud is more than a thousand times as far from the Sun as the Kuiper belt, the scattered disc and the detached objects—three nearer reservoirs of trans-Neptunian objects. Both regions lie well beyond the heliosphere, one of two boundaries chosen by planetary scientists at the end of the Solar system.

The Oort cloud extends to the limits of the Sun's gravitational sphere of influence, the other boundary chosen by planetary scientists for the end of the Solar system. This area is defined by the Sun's Hill sphere, and hence lies at the interface between solar and galactic gravitational dominion. The outer Oort cloud is only loosely bound to the Sun and its constituents are easily affected by the gravitational pulls of passing stars, the Milky Way itself and the cloud's own microgravity. These forces served to moderate and render more circular the highly eccentric orbits of material ejected from the inner Solar System during its early phases of development. The circular orbits of material in the Oort disc are largely thanks to this galactic gravitational torquing. By the same token, galactic interference in the motion of Oort bodies occasionally dislodges comets from their orbits within the cloud, sending them into the inner Solar System. Based on their orbits, most but not all of the short-period comets appear to have come from the Oort disc. Other short-period comets may have originated from the far larger spherical cloud.

Astronomers hypothesize that the material presently in the Oort cloud formed much closer to the Sun, in the protoplanetary disc, and was then scattered far into space through the gravitational influence of the giant planets. No direct observation of the Oort cloud is possible with present imaging technology. Nevertheless, the cloud is thought to be the source that replenishes most long-period and Halley-type comets, which are eventually consumed by their close approaches to the Sun after entering the inner Solar System. The cloud may also serve the same function for many of the centaurs and Jupiter-family comets.

== Development of theory ==
By the early 20th century, astronomers had identified two main types of comets: short-period comets (also called ecliptic comets) and long-period comets (also called nearly isotropic comets). Ecliptic comets have relatively small orbits aligned near the ecliptic plane and are not found much farther than the Kuiper cliff around 50 AU from the Sun (the orbit of Neptune averages about 30 AU and 177P/Barnard's aphelion lies at around 48 AU). Long-period comets, on the other hand, travel in very large orbits thousands of AU from the Sun and are isotropically distributed. This means long-period comets appear from every direction in the sky, both above and below the ecliptic plane.

In 1907, Armin Otto Leuschner showed that comet trajectories were related to observation time: Short times implied assumed parabolic trajectories, and longer times implied elliptical orbits. Leuschner conjectured that better statistics would show that comets had elliptical orbits and were permanent members of the Solar System that would return to the inner Solar System after long intervals during which they were invisible to Earth-based astronomy. In 1932, the Estonian astronomer Ernst Öpik proposed a reservoir of long-period comets in the form of an orbiting cloud at the outermost edge of the Solar System. Dutch astronomer Jan Oort revived this idea in 1950 to resolve a paradox about the origin of comets. The following facts are not easily reconcilable with the highly elliptical orbits in which long-period comets are always found:

- Over millions and billions of years the orbits of Oort cloud comets are unstable. Celestial dynamics dictate that a comet will eventually be pulled away by a passing star, collide with the Sun or a planet, or be ejected from the Solar System through planetary perturbations.
- Moreover, the volatile composition of comets means that as they repeatedly approach the Sun, radiation gradually boils off these volatiles until the comet splits or develops an insulating crust that prevents further outgassing.

Oort reasoned that comets with orbits that closely approach the Sun cannot have been doing so since the condensation of the protoplanetary disc, more than 4.5 billion years ago. Hence long-period comets could not have formed in the current orbits in which they are always discovered and must have been held in an outer reservoir for nearly all of their existence.

Oort also studied tables of ephemerides for long-period comets and discovered that there is a curious concentration of long-period comets whose farthest retreat from the Sun (their aphelia) cluster around 20,000 AU. This suggested a reservoir at that distance with a spherical, isotropic distribution. He also proposed that the relatively rare comets with orbits of about 10,000 AU probably went through one or more orbits into the inner Solar System and there had their orbits drawn inward by the gravity of the planets.

== Structure and composition ==
The presumed distance of the Oort cloud compared to the rest of the Solar System

The Oort cloud is thought to occupy a vast space somewhere between 2,000 and 5,000 AU (0.03 and 0.08 ly) from the Sun to as far out as 50,000 AU (0.79 ly) or even 100,000 to 200,000 AU (1.58 to 3.16 ly). The region can be subdivided into a spherical outer Oort cloud with a radius of some 20,000–50,000 AU (0.32–0.79 ly) and a torus-shaped inner Oort cloud with a radius of 2,000–20,000 AU (0.03–0.32 ly).

The inner Oort cloud is sometimes known as the Hills cloud, named for Jack G. Hills, who proposed its existence in 1981. Models predict the inner cloud to be much the denser of the two, having tens or hundreds of times as many cometary nuclei as the outer cloud. The Hills cloud is thought to be necessary to explain the continued existence of the Oort cloud after billions of years.

Because it lies at the interface between the dominion of Solar and galactic gravitation, the objects comprising the outer Oort cloud are only weakly bound to the Sun. This in turn allows small perturbations from nearby stars or the Milky Way itself to inject long-period (and possibly Halley-type) comets inside the orbit of Neptune. This process ought to have depleted the sparser, outer cloud and yet long-period comets with orbits well above or below the ecliptic continue to be observed. The Hills cloud is thought to be a secondary reservoir of cometary nuclei and the source of replenishment for the tenuous outer cloud as the latter's numbers are gradually depleted through losses to the inner Solar System.

The outer Oort cloud may have trillions of objects larger than 1 km (0.6 mi), and billions with diameters of 20-kilometre (12 mi). This corresponds to an absolute magnitude of more than 11. On this analysis, "neighboring" objects in the outer cloud are separated by a significant fraction of 1 AU, tens of millions of kilometres. The outer cloud's total mass is not known, but assuming that Halley's Comet is a suitable proxy for the nuclei composing the outer Oort cloud, their combined mass would be roughly 3×10^{25} kilograms (6.6×10^{25} lb), or five Earth masses. Formerly the outer cloud was thought to be more massive by two orders of magnitude, containing up to 380 Earth masses, but improved knowledge of the size distribution of long-period comets has led to lower estimates. No estimates of the mass of the inner Oort cloud have been published as of 2023.

If analyses of comets are representative of the whole, the vast majority of Oort-cloud objects consist of ices such as water, methane, ethane, carbon monoxide and hydrogen cyanide. However, the discovery of the object 1996 PW, an object whose appearance was consistent with a D-type asteroid in an orbit typical of a long-period comet, prompted theoretical research that suggests that the Oort cloud population consists of roughly one to two percent asteroids. Analysis of the carbon and nitrogen isotope ratios in both the long-period and Jupiter-family comets shows little difference between the two, despite their presumably vastly separate regions of origin. This suggests that both originated from the original protosolar cloud, a conclusion also supported by studies of granular size in Oort-cloud comets and by the recent impact study of Jupiter-family comet Tempel 1.

== Origin ==
The Oort cloud is thought to have developed after the formation of planets from the primordial protoplanetary disc approximately 4.6 billion years ago. The most widely accepted hypothesis is that the Oort cloud's objects initially coalesced much closer to the Sun as part of the same process that formed the planets and minor planets. After formation, strong gravitational interactions with young gas giants, such as Jupiter, scattered the objects into extremely wide elliptical or parabolic orbits that were subsequently modified by perturbations from passing stars and giant molecular clouds into long-lived orbits detached from the gas giant region.

However, the Oort cloud seems to have more objects than the basic model predicts. Simulations suggest that additional objects may have been captured from the protoplanetary disks of nearby stars before they drifted away. Simulations of the evolution of the Oort cloud from the beginnings of the Solar System to the present suggest that the cloud's mass peaked around 800 million years after formation, as the pace of accretion and collision slowed and depletion began to overtake supply.

Another source is the scattered disc, the main source for periodic comets in the Solar System. According to the models, about half of the objects scattered travel outward toward the Oort cloud, whereas a quarter are shifted inward to Jupiter's orbit, and a quarter are ejected on hyperbolic orbits. The scattered disc might still be supplying the Oort cloud with material. A third of the scattered disc's population is likely to end up in the Oort cloud after 2.5 billion years.

Computer models suggest that collisions of cometary debris during the formation period play a far greater role than was previously thought. According to these models, the number of collisions early in the Solar System's history was so great that most comets were destroyed before they reached the Oort cloud. Therefore, the current cumulative mass of the Oort cloud is far less than was once suspected. The estimated mass of the cloud is only a small part of the 50–100 Earth masses of ejected material.

Gravitational interaction with nearby stars and galactic tides modified cometary orbits to make them more circular. This explains the nearly spherical shape of the outer Oort cloud. On the other hand, the Hills cloud, which is bound more strongly to the Sun, has not acquired a spherical shape. Recent studies have shown that the formation of the Oort cloud is broadly compatible with the hypothesis that the Solar System formed as part of an embedded cluster of 200–400 stars. These early stars likely played a role in the cloud's formation, since the number of close stellar passages within the cluster was much higher than today, leading to far more frequent perturbations.

Other ideas include a temporary binary companion star for the Sun early in the history of the Solar system leading to the capture of additional objects in the Oort cloud. Meteoroids from long-period (Oort cloud) comets appear to be accreted under more gentle conditions than those from Jupiter family comets (from the scattered disc), suggesting that the birth cloud stars perturbed long Oort cloud comet orbits rather than providing them, and that outer parts of the Oort Cloud did not form until late in the formation of the solar system when the outer (more gently accreted) parts of the planetary disk were scattered.

== Comets ==
Comets are remnants from the formation of the Solar system around 4 billion years ago, stored in two separate areas, the Kuiper belt and the Oort cloud. Short-period comets (those with orbits of up to 200 years) are generally accepted to have emerged from either the Kuiper belt or the scattered disc, which are two linked flat discs of icy debris beyond Neptune's orbit at 30 AU and jointly extending out beyond 100 AU. Very long-period comets, such as C/1999 F1 (Catalina), whose orbits last for millions of years, are thought to originate directly from the outer Oort cloud. Other comets modeled to have come directly from the outer Oort cloud include C/2006 P1 (McNaught), C/2010 X1 (Elenin), Comet ISON, C/2013 A1 (Siding Spring), C/2017 K2, and C/2017 T2 (PANSTARRS). The orbits within the Kuiper belt are relatively stable, so very few comets are thought to originate there. The scattered disc, however, is dynamically active and is far more likely to be the place of origin for comets. Comets pass from the scattered disc into the realm of the outer planets, becoming what are known as centaurs. Some of these centaurs are then scattered farther inward to become short-period comets.

There are two main types of short-period comets: Jupiter-family comets (with orbits smaller than 5 AU) and Halley-family comets. Halley-family comets, named after Halley's Comet, are distinct because, even though they are short-period comets, they are thought to come from the Oort Cloud rather than the scattered disc. Based on their orbits, it is suggested they were long-period comets that were captured by the gravity of the giant planets and sent into the inner Solar System. This process may have also created the present orbits of a significant fraction of the Jupiter-family comets, although the majority of such comets are thought to have originated in the scattered disc.

Oort noted that the number of returning comets was far less than his model predicted, and this issue, known as "cometary fading", has yet to be resolved. No dynamical process is known to explain the smaller number of observed comets than Oort estimated. Hypotheses for this discrepancy include the destruction of comets due to tidal stresses, impact or heating; the loss of all volatiles, rendering some comets invisible, or the formation of a non-volatile crust on the surface. Dynamical studies of hypothetical Oort cloud comets have estimated that their occurrence in the outer-planet region would be several times higher than in the inner-planet region. This discrepancy may be due to the gravitational attraction of Jupiter, which acts as a kind of barrier, trapping incoming comets and causing them to collide with it, just as it did with Comet Shoemaker–Levy 9 in 1994. An example of a typical dynamically old comet with an origin in the Oort cloud could be C/2018 F4.

== Sedna and similar objects ==
Several observed objects have been proposed as members of the inner Oort cloud. Sedna, first reported in 2004, has a highly eccentric orbit with a perihelion distances of 76 AU. 2012 VP_{113}, observed in 2012, has a larger perihelion (closest approach to the Sun) but its aphelion is half of Sedna's. Other candidate objects include 2010 GB_{174} and 474640 Alicanto (originally 2004 VN_{112}).

== Tidal effects ==
Most of the comets seen close to the Sun seem to have reached their current positions through gravitational perturbation of the Oort cloud by the tidal force exerted by the Milky Way. Just as the Moon's tidal force deforms Earth's oceans, causing the tides to rise and fall, the galactic tide also distorts the orbits of bodies in the outer Solar System. In the charted regions of the Solar System, these effects are negligible compared to the gravity of the Sun, but in the outer reaches of the system, the Sun's gravity is weaker and the gradient of the Milky Way's gravitational Galactic Center compresses it along the other two axes; these small perturbations can shift orbits in the Oort cloud to bring objects close to the Sun. The point at which the Sun's gravity concedes its influence to the galactic tide is called the tidal truncation radius. It lies at a radius of 100,000 to 200,000 AU, and marks the outer boundary of the Oort cloud.

Some scholars theorize that the galactic tide may have contributed to the formation of the Oort cloud by increasing the perihelia (smallest distances to the Sun) of planetesimals with large aphelia (largest distances to the Sun). The effects of the galactic tide are quite complex, and depend heavily on the behaviour of individual objects within a planetary system. Cumulatively, however, the effect can be quite significant: up to 90% of all comets originating from the Oort cloud may be the result of the galactic tide. Statistical models of the observed orbits of long-period comets argue that the galactic tide is the principal means by which their orbits are perturbed toward the inner Solar System.

== Stellar perturbations and stellar companion hypotheses ==
Besides the galactic tide, the main trigger for sending comets into the inner Solar System is thought to be interaction between the Sun's Oort cloud and the gravitational fields of nearby stars or giant molecular clouds. The orbit of the Sun through the plane of the Milky Way sometimes brings it into relatively close proximity to other stellar systems. For example, it is hypothesized that 70,000 years ago Scholz's Star passed through the outer Oort cloud (although its low mass and high relative velocity limited its effect). During the next 10 million years the known star with the greatest possibility of perturbing the Oort cloud is Gliese 710. This process could also scatter Oort cloud objects out of the ecliptic plane, potentially also explaining its spherical distribution.

In 1984, physicist Richard A. Muller postulated that the Sun has an as-yet undetected companion, either a brown dwarf or a red dwarf, in an elliptical orbit within the Oort cloud. This object, known as Nemesis, was hypothesized to pass through a portion of the Oort cloud approximately every 26 million years, bombarding the inner Solar System with comets. However, to date no evidence of Nemesis has been found, and many lines of evidence (such as crater counts), have thrown its existence into doubt. Recent scientific analysis no longer supports the idea that extinctions on Earth happen at regular, repeating intervals. Thus, the Nemesis hypothesis is no longer needed to explain current assumptions.

A somewhat similar hypothesis was advanced by astronomer John J. Matese of the University of Louisiana at Lafayette in 2002. He contends that more comets are arriving in the inner Solar System from a particular region of the postulated Oort cloud than can be explained by the galactic tide or stellar perturbations alone, and that the most likely cause would be a Jupiter-mass object in a distant orbit. This hypothetical gas giant was nicknamed Tyche. The WISE mission, an all-sky survey using parallax measurements in order to clarify local star distances, was capable of proving or disproving the Tyche hypothesis. In 2014, NASA announced that the WISE survey had ruled out any object as they had defined it.

== Future exploration ==
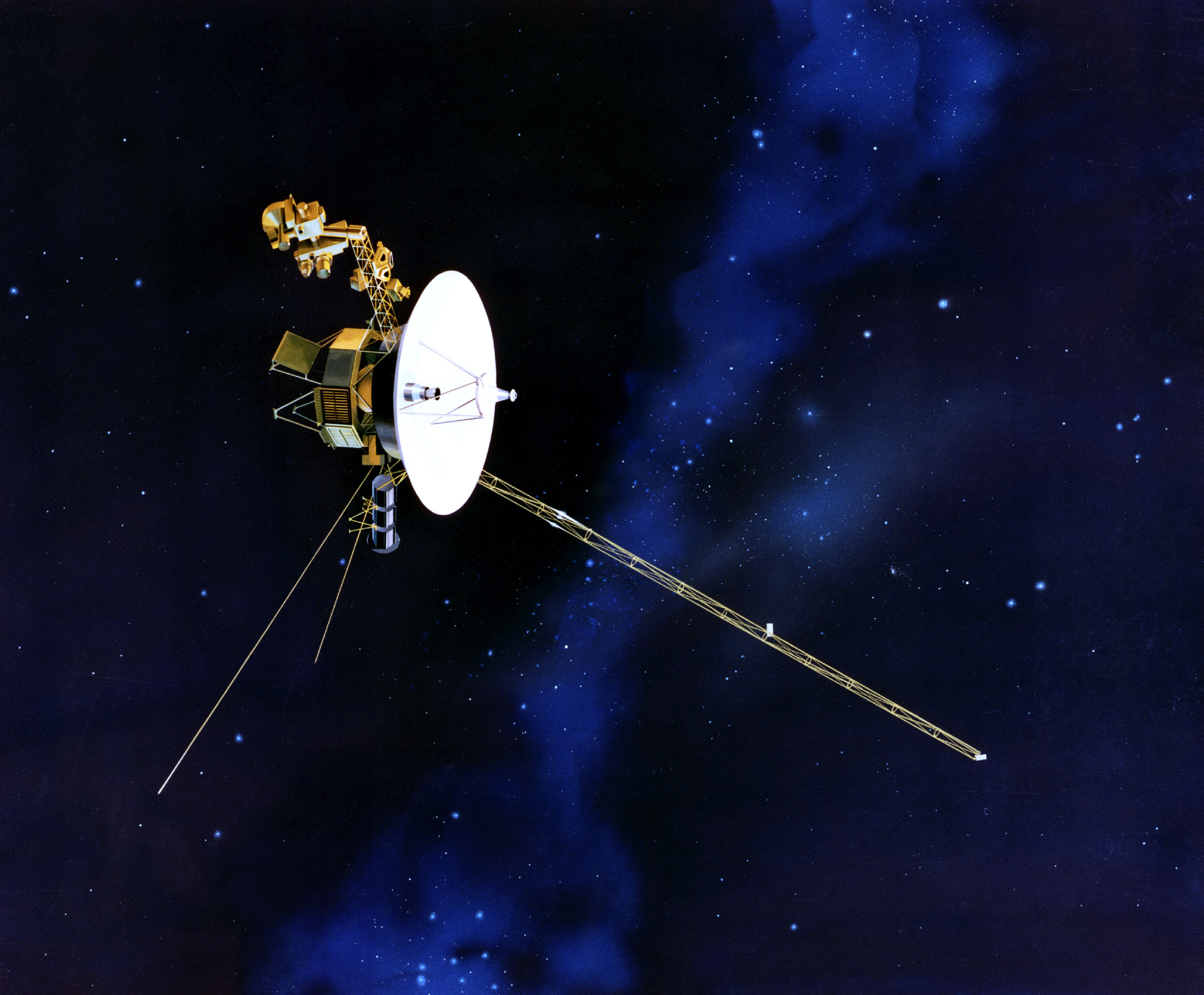
Artist's impression of the Voyager spacecraft

Voyager 1, the most distant spacecraft, will not reach the Oort cloud for about 300 years and would take about 30,000 years to pass through it. In the 1980s, there was a concept for a probe that could reach 1,000 AU in 50 years, called TAU; among its missions would be to look for the Oort cloud. A solar sail could reach the cloud in a human lifetime without requiring significant space infrastructure, depending on the model.

In the 2014 Announcement of Opportunity for the Discovery program, an observatory to detect the objects in the Oort cloud (and Kuiper belt) called the "Whipple Mission" was proposed. It would monitor distant stars with a photometer, looking for transits up to 10,000 AU away. The observatory was proposed for halo orbiting around L2 with a suggested 5-year mission. It was also suggested that the Kepler space telescope could have been capable of detecting objects in the Oort cloud.

== See also ==
- Heliosphere
- Hills cloud
- Interstellar object
- List of possible dwarf planets
- List of trans-Neptunian objects
- Nemesis (hypothetical star)
- Planets beyond Neptune
- Scattered disc
- Tyche (hypothetical planet)
