= Meteorite fall =

Collected meteorite whose fall was observed

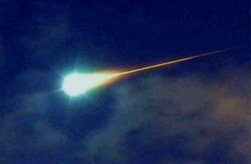
Witnessed bolide

A meteorite fall, also called an observed fall, is a meteorite collected after its fall from outer space, that was observed by people or automated devices. Any other meteorite is called a "find". As of October 2026, the Meteoritical Bulletin Database listed 1,279 observed falls of approved meteorites, most of which have specimens in modern collections.

== Significance ==
Observed meteorite falls are of societal and scientific importance for several reasons:

- In the most energetic of events, falls are observed by many human observers, and can co-occur with dramatic consequences as seen during the Chelyabinsk meteor event, in which 1,491 people were injured seriously enough to seek medical treatment (most injured from broken glass from the shockwave; no fatalities).
- Material from observed falls has not been subjected to terrestrial weathering, making the fall an ideal candidate for scientific study into the dynamics of dust and small-body formation and understanding the history of solar system formation.
- Historically, observed falls were the most compelling evidence supporting the extraterrestrial origin of meteorites.
- A robust subculture of meteorite hunters has developed along with an associated market for meteorite minerals.
- Observed fall discoveries are currently the best data source to understand the types of meteorites which fall to Earth. For example, iron meteorites take much longer to weather and are easier to identify as unusual objects, as compared to other types. This may explain the increased proportion of iron meteorites among finds (6.7%), over that among observed falls (4.4%). There is also detailed statistics on falls such as based on meteorite classification.

== Largest falls ==
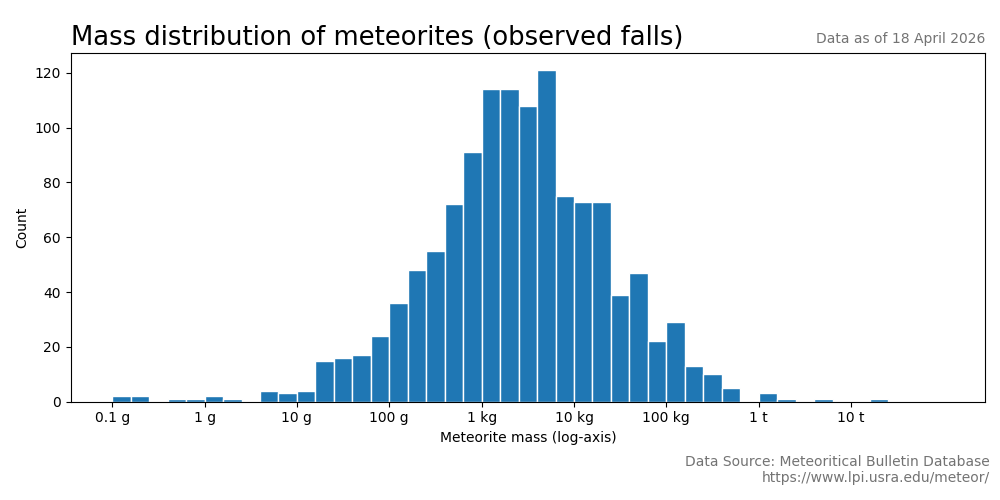
Mass distribution of meteorites from observed falls. Data from the Meteoritical Bulletin Database.

Half of all confirmed falls are listed in the Meteoritical Bulletin Database with masses between 0.1 g to 2.5 kg. However, there are more than 60 meteorites with 100 kg or more. Six of them total more than one metric ton. The six largest falls are listed below and five (except the 2013 Chelyabinsk meteorite) occurred during the 20th century. Presumably, events of such magnitude may happen a few times per century (often in remote areas) and have typically gone unreported.

For comparison, the largest finds (not corresponding to an observed fall) are the 60-ton Hoba meteorite, a 30.8-ton fragment (Gancedo) and a 28.8-ton fragment (El Chaco) of the Campo del Cielo, and a 30.9-ton fragment (Ahnighito) of the Cape York meteorite.

Meteorite name	Total mass in tonnes (1,000 kg)	Fall observation date	Country	State, province, or region	Classification	Ref.
Sikhote-Alin	23	12 February 1947	Russia	Primorye	IIAB iron	
Jilin	4	8 March 1976	China	Jilin	H5	
Allende	2	8 February 1969	Mexico	Chihuahua	CV3	
Kunya-Urgench	1.1	20 June 1998	Turkmenistan	Daşoguz	H5	
Norton County	1.1	18 February 1948	United States	Kansas	Aubrite	
Chelyabinsk	1	15 February 2013	Russia	Chelyabinsk	LL5	

== Observation methods ==
Annual average of observed meteorite falls by decade, since 1790s. Data from Meteoritical Bulletin Database, current as of 20 December 2025.

=== Statistics ===
While the stream of meteorites reaching Earth remains pretty much constant over time, statistics of meteorite falls show a more or less continuous increase in the number of observed meteorite falls from the end of the 18th century until a significant peak in the 1930s. This steady increase has been described as early as 1963 and has been explained with changing social, scientific and technical circumstances: population growth and higher population density, improving communication, the expansion of scientific institutions, and the increasing organization of meteoritics and greater interest from the general public all raised the likelihood that fireballs would be reported and that fresh meteorites would be deliberately searched for and recovered. The peak during the 1930s also coincides with increased activity by private collectors, especially Harvey H. Nininger and Oscar Monnig who set significant accents in meteorite hunt and research and the foundation of the Society for Research on Meteorites (now known as the Meteoritical Society) in August 1933, with Frederick C. Leonard as the first president and Nininger as secretary.

The decline in the 1940s is explained by the disruptions caused by World War II, which significantly impaired fieldwork, international cooperation, publication activity and the acquisition of collections. The increase in observed falls since the beginning of the 21st century can be attributed to improved technical and organizational capabilities for detection and recovery, particularly through global and regional fireball networks, satellite detections, meteor reporting websites, weather radar observations, the spread of digital cameras and social media as well as the use of metal detectors, drones and coordinated search teams.

Era	Number of falls	Average per year
Pre-1900	400	–
1900–1949	344	6.9
1950–1959	60	6.0
1960–1969	63	6.3
1970–1979	63	6.3
1980–1989	56	5.6
1990–1999	59	5.9
2000–2009	71	7.1
2010–2019	92	9.2
2020-2025	70	11.7
2026	2	–
Total	1,279	–

=== Automated fireball detection devices ===
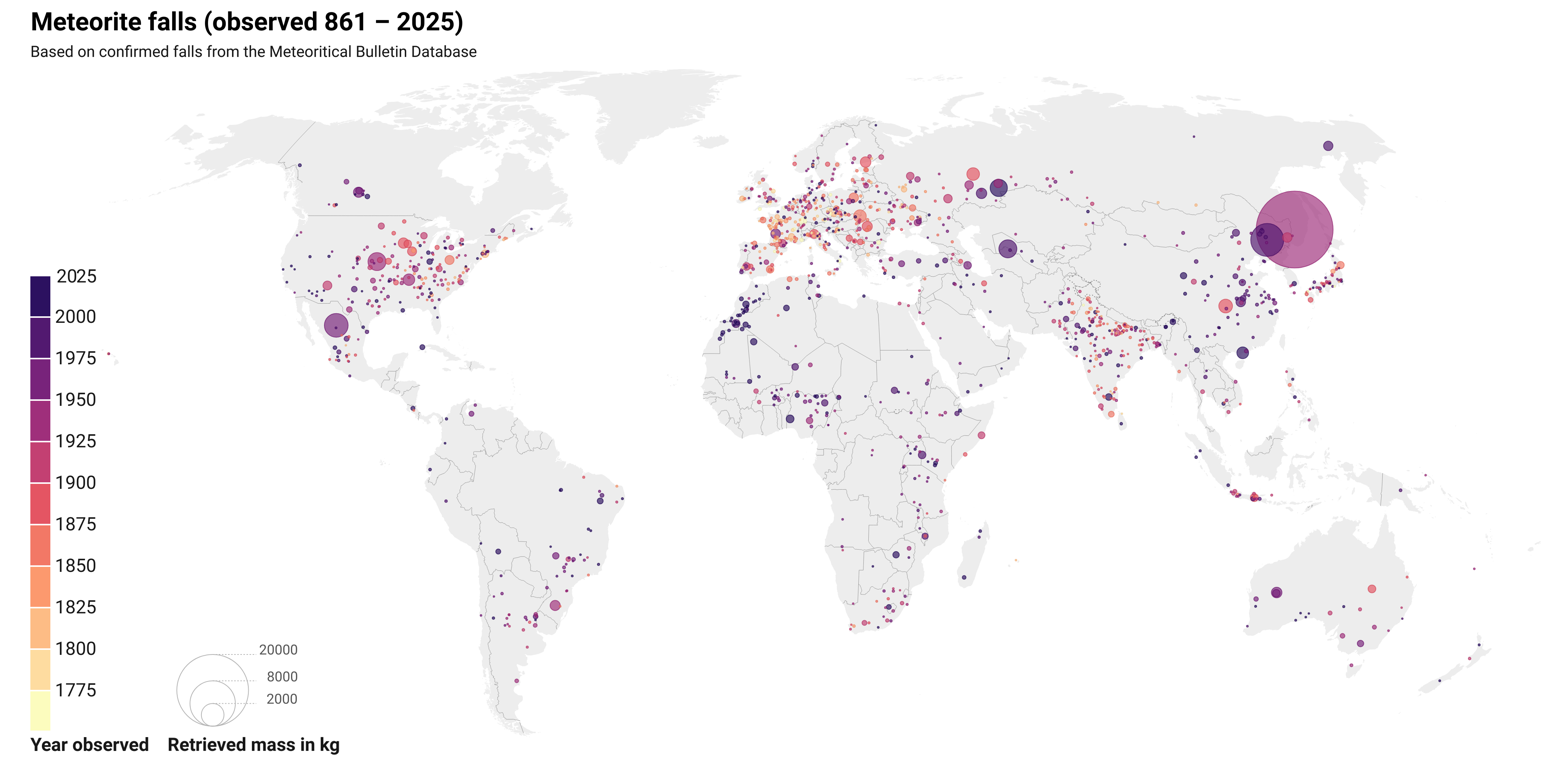
Map of all confirmed meteorite falls ever observed by humans (and automated devices) from 861 to 2025, based on approved meteorites from the Meteoritical Bulletin Database (as of 21 December 2025)

In April 1959 the meteorite Příbram was the first meteorite whose trajectory was tracked by multiple cameras recording the associated fireball. The Ondřejov Observatory in the Czech Republic captured photos of the fireball using eleven widely spaced cameras. With the help of this stereo recording (through triangulation), Přibram's trajectory could be reconstructed quite accurately, aiding its recovery and also – for the very first time – enabling scientists to trace its pre-impact orbit back to the asteroid belt.

Eleven years later, the fireball from the Lost City meteorite, was recorded with four cameras from the Prairie Meteorite Network operated by the Smithsonian Astrophysical Observatory, when it fell in Cherokee County Oklahoma, in January 1970. This was the first time a meteorite was recovered solely on the basis of photographic measurements. In 1977 the meteorite of Innisfree was discovered using photographs taken by the Meteorite Observation and Recovery Program of the National Research Council of Canada. The fall of Benešov was recorded in 1991, however the meteorite was only recovered in 2011 after the strewnfield was recalculated and metal detectors were used to search for small fragments.

The meteorite of Ischgl was found by an Austria forest ranger in 1976 and was kept at home by the finder without undergoing any scientific examination until 2008, when it was classified as a meteorite. Upon review of the archived fireball events photographed by the German fireball camera network, it could be determined, in a study published in 2024, that in November 1970 a fireball event observed by 10 different stations was connected to the fall of the later discovered meteorite.

Over the last decades fireball networks consisting of dedicated arrays of cameras were put in operation in several countries. As more automated cameras monitor the night sky and track fireballs, the chances of locating meteorites have increased. Statistics for observed falls by decade are listed in the table in this section. It took more than 30 years for the falls of the first 4 meteorites to be recorded by automated devices, the same amount of falls with documented trajectories as in the single year of 2015.

For the period since 2020 the number of meteorite falls reported globally each year has increased on average to more than ten per year, up from about six a year in the 1990s. As of December 2025 there are 75 instrumentally observed recovered meteorites, for which also a pre-impact orbit could be determined.

Today, there are several networks of whole sky cameras recording space rock from different directions, thus making it easier to calculate the impact sites of meteorites and increasing the probability of actually finding material after a meteor has been observed.

Statistics show an increase in the number of meteorite falls with instrumentally recorded trajectories.

Among the camera networks are:

- Cameras for All-Sky Meteor Surveillance
- European Fireball Network
- Desert Fireball Network
- FRIPON

=== Video cameras ===
Accidental random fireball records documented by video have increased over the past decades and social media now distributes videos so broadly that a much larger share of falls is being captured and documented. The first ever meteor to be filmed by a camera was the Great Daylight Fireball which blazed over the Rocky Mountains in 1972; however, this earth grazer supposedly left earth's atmosphere again, without meteorites impacting the ground.

The first meteorite fall to be documented by video cameras by coincidence was Peekskill meteorite in 1992. The bright fireball visible for more than 40 seconds was recorded by 15 chance eyewitnesses' video cameras from different locations. Peekskill back then was only the fourth meteorite whose prior orbit could be calculated based on the reconstructed trajectory of the fall. The orbits for the previous falls of Přibram (1959), Lost City meteorite (1970) and Innisfree (1977) had been determined based on photographs. Peekskill, however, was the first fall documented by motion-picture footage.

Video cameras have since become widespread with the rise of surveillance or traffic cameras, ski-resort webcams, dashboard and doorbell cameras and smart phones, which have all been used to capture fireballs in connection with recovered meteorites. Among the most spectacular falls observed by numerous cameras is the Chelyabinsk meteor from February 2013.

The fall of the meteorite in Novo Mesto, Slovenia, in February 2020 was captured by dashcams, security cameras and even a camera mounted on a cyclist's helmet. The footage was used by astronomers to triangulate the meteorite's trajectory.

The fall of the Charlottetown meteorite in 2024 was the first case, where the actual moment of the impact on the ground was recorded with video including audio. The sound of the meteorite shattering upon impact has been described as similar to the sound of breaking ice.

=== Radar detection ===
Weather radar has become a useful aid for locating meteorites after observed fireballs because it can detect descending fragments of the meteorite during the dark flight-phase; that is, the phase of a meteorite's descent when its speed has been slowed by atmospheric drag to the point that it no longer emits visible light and the fragments reach terminal velocity.

Radar-derived echoes from falling stones can help determine whether an observed fireball event has produced meteorites large enough to be recovered on the ground. Radar data in combination with weather data can be used to reconstruct a fall's final trajectory in order to calculate a possible strewn field. This allows people searching for meteorites to focus their search efforts more efficiently than by relying only on traditional methods such as eyewitness accounts, recordings from security cameras and other video sources. Targeted searches have improved the chances to quickly collect minimally weathered specimens that are scientifically valuable for studying the composition and history of their parent bodies.

The fall of the Ash Creek meteorite in February 2009 was the first time when data from weather radar was used to locate meteorites on the ground. Among the radar-enabled recoveries of meteorites is also the fall of the Sutter's Mill meteorite. Archived radar data has also been used retrospectively to identify radar signals of falling fragments for earlier meteorite falls such as Worden in 1997 or Indian Butte in 1998.

Most of the radar detections of meteorite falls have occurred in the United States, where the data produced by the NEXRAD system is publicly available online almost in real time and archived since the introduction of the system in the 1990s. As of 2025 there are 32 meteorite falls where evidence of falling debris was found in NEXRAD data. The ARES Division of NASA also publishes possible landing zones of meteorite fragments identified by radar stations across the United States. Among them are also falls outside the United States, such as the Grimsby meteorite, a fall from 2009 in Canada and the Viñales meteorite, a fall from 2019 in Cuba, both of which were within the detection radius of NEXRAD stations.

=== Astronomical observations before impact ===
In October 2008, the observation of asteroid 2008 TC_{3} turned into the first meteorite whose impact had been predicted. The asteroid on a collision course with Earth had been discovered by Richard Kowalski with the automated Catalina Sky Survey telescope at Mount Lemmon Observatory, about 20 hours before it entered the atmosphere and fell in the Nubian Desert in Sudan. The fall of the meteorite could be observed from a distance of 1,400 km by pilots of a KLM passenger plane flying over Chad and a webcam from a beach in Egypt from a distance of 725 km. Eyewitnesses on the ground in Wadi Halfa and at "train station number six" (Arabic: al-Maḥaṭṭa Sitta) in northern Sudan at 05:46 am local time observed a meteor and heard explosion sounds. Two months after the fall, an expedition organized by the University of Khartoum found the first fragments of the meteorite. The meteorite was named Almahata Sitta, after the train station. Altogether 10.5 kg of the meteorite in some 600 fragments were recovered.

Since the observed fall of the Almahata Sitta meteorite, 11 more asteroids have been added to the list of predicted asteroid impacts on Earth which impacted earth after discovery and orbit calculation that predicted the impact in advance.

Among them are 3 more observed falls, where fragments of the meteorites could be recovered:

- Meteorite Motopi Pan – (Asteroid 2018 LA)
- Meteorite Saint-Pierre-le-Viger – (Asteroid 2023 CX1)
- Meteorite Ribbeck – (Asteroid 2024 BX1)

== Historic records of meteors and meteorites ==
=== Meteoric iron ===
Throughout recorded history, humans have observed meteor showers and fireballs in the sky and occasionally documented these events. Since antiquity there are written records on sporadic meteors from Chinese, Korean, Babylonian, Greek and Roman sources. Due to the distinctive metallurgical properties meteoric iron was used by cultures worldwide, even before the Iron Age – among them Tutankhamun's meteoric iron dagger, a Bronze Age arrowhead found in Switzerland and tools made from the Cape York meteorite by Inuit.

=== Philological evidence ===
Philological evidence suggests that in several ancient cultures the word "iron" was used in connection with the sky, reflecting an awareness that rare iron masses could arrive as meteorites. In Mesopotamia the Sumerian term for iron was an-bar, meaning "fire from heaven" and the parallel Hittite term ku-an also conveys a celestial origin. Egyptian terminology points the same way: The compound expression bia-en-pet that first appeared in the Nineteenth Dynasty of Egypt (13th century BCE) combines the terms for "thunderbolt" and "heaven" and in the meaning for "iron of the sky" was used for iron in general – suggesting an explicit recognition of meteoritic iron. Similar ideas appear in Semitic languages, where Hebrew parzil and Akkadian barzillu derive from barzu-ili "metal of god/of heaven" and the association persists into modern Georgian, where a meteorite is called tsis-natckhi "fragment of heaven".

=== Meteorite of Aegospotami ===
The meteorite of Aegospotami might be the earliest case of a meteorite fall, where in surviving literature an observed fall is directly linked to a recovered mass. Writing about this meteorite, the ancient Greek natural philosopher Diogenes of Apollonia – living in the 5th century BCE – is also credited as the first author to argue meteorites have an extraterrestrial origin. According to writings recorded by doxographer Aetius he established:

"In addition to the visible stars, invisible stones also wander through the heavens, having no name. They frequently fall on Earth and their fire gets extinguished, like the stony star which fell in flames at Aegospotami."

Ancient writers including Aristotle, Pliny the Elder and Plutarch reported that a large stone fell at Aegospotami on the Gallipoli Peninsula in the second year of the 78th Olympiad – corresponding to the year 466 BCE. The meteorite was described as brown in colour and the size of a wagon load and according to Plutarch was displayed and worshipped by the inhabitants of the Gallipoli Peninsula for several hundred years, until at least the first century AD.

The object itself did not survive for modern study but the event, although unconfirmed, has been treated as plausible report of a meteorite fall. The name of Diogenes of Apollonia lives on in the meteorite world, since Gustav Tschermak in 1885 proposed the name Diogenite for an abundant type of Achondrite "after Diogenes of Apollonia, who was the first to express clear ideas about the cosmic origin and the sidereal nature of meteorites."

The fact that Diogenes' hypothesis about the extraterrestrial origin of meteorites was given minimal further attention and it took more than two millennia for his solution to gain scientific acceptance is also due to Aristotle. Aristotle about a century after Diogenes of Apollonia proposed a different account, treating the phenomenon as atmospheric; in his Meteorologica he discusses the Aegospotami stone in connection with a bright comet and suggests winds related to the comet carried the stone and dropped it later. In 2010 a computer model showed, that the comet described by Aristotle coincides with the retrodicted appearance of Halley's Comet in the summer of 466 BCE.

Aristotle's work – in which he also proposed that interplanetary space was devoid of solid matter – exerted a strong influence well beyond antiquity and his ideas were adopted by scholars in the Middle Ages and the early modern period. As a result, even in the 18th century most western scholars remained convinced that meteorites did not originate from outer space. Instead, they were often explained as stones thrown into the air by volcanic eruptions or lightning strikes and then falling back to the ground, or as products formed within the atmosphere through the action of lightning.

== Beginning of scientific meteorite research ==
Around the turn of the 18th to the 19th century, a series of insights and publications, events and investigations laid the foundation for the scientific study of stones that fall from the sky. It was between 1794 and 1804 towards the ending Age of Enlightenment, when the debate shifted from anecdote and skepticism to treating meteorites as objects of empirical study, and meteoritics began to develop into a serious scientific discipline. Within ten years, four major scientific advances paved the way for broad acceptance. By 1804, most scholars accepted that meteorites are of extraterrestrial origin.

=== Ernst Chladni's book on the origin of iron masses ===
In April 1794, the German natural scientist Ernst Chladni published his book "On the Origin of the Pallas Iron and Other Similar Iron Masses, and on Some Associated Natural Phenomena". With his book Chladni was the first in modern Western thought to publish the then audacious idea that meteorites are rocks from space, making the book a major turning point in the understanding of meteorites. Challenging the prevailing terrestrial explanations and the widespread skepticism of his time, he proposed a coherent hypothesis that linked reported falls of stones and irons to bright fireballs and argued that these objects originated in cosmic space rather than on earth. By reframing "stones from the sky" as a legitimate natural phenomenon worth investigating, it helped kick-start modern meteoritics and paved the way for later acceptance through systematic studies and well-documented falls. Chladni is therefore sometimes considered as the father of meteoritics.

After a conversation with Georg Christoph Lichtenberg, who had witnessed a fireball in 1791, Ernst Chladni started searching the literature for eyewitness accounts of fireballs and rocks from the sky. He spent several weeks in the Göttingen State and University Library, which was considered one of the leading research libraries in Germany at the time, and studied reports of 18 observed meteorite falls from various countries and dating from antiquity to the 18th century. Chladni compiled what he considered the most reliable eyewitness reports and the striking consistency among these accounts convinced him that the witnesses were describing a real physical phenomenon.

The three most prominent records of observed falls studied by Chladni were the meteorites of Eichstädt (1785), Tabor (1753) and Hraschina (1751). For information on these three falls, Chladni quoted extensively from a paper "On Some Stones Allegedly Fallen from Heaven" published in 1790 by Austrian mineralogist Andreas Stütz. He compared them to the accounts of observed falls from Ensisheim (1492), Pleskowitz (1723), Nicorps (1750), Albareto (1766), Lucé (1768) and Aire-sur-la-Lys (1769). All of these meteorites are still considered observed falls today, although not all of these meteorites are still preserved.

=== Observation of falls and systematic field investigations ===
==== Meteorite of Siena ====
The publication of Chladnis book at Easter 1794 happened only six weeks before the well observed and documented meteorite fall of Siena in Italy. The Siena meteorite shower of 16 June 1794 was the first in modern times to occur in the vicinity of a major European city, which at the time had a population of nearly 30,000. Hence the meteorite fall was witnessed by so many people that its authenticity was difficult to dismiss. The observed fall sparked a lively controversy involving more than half a dozen scientists.

==== Meteorite of L'Aigle ====
A decisive turning point came with the meteorite fall of L'Aigle in France in 1803 and the documentation of this event by Jean-Baptiste Biot for the French scientific establishment; his systematic collection of testimony, mapping of the strewn field, and material comparisons helped convince much of the European scientific community that meteorites are real extraterrestrial falls.

=== Chemical analysis of meteorites ===
Another step forward into the future of meteoritics was the laboratory work of British chemist Edward Charles Howard and French mineralogist Jacques Louis, Comte de Bournon. They carried out analyses of samples of recently observed falls of Benares, Siena, Wold Cottage and Tabor together with samples from iron finds of Campo del Cielo, Krasnojarsk, Siratik and Steinbach. They published their results in 1801 and in an extended version in 1802 showing that, unlike ordinary terrestrial rocks, all the examined meteorites contained nickel, which is extremely rare in the Earth's crust and therefore implying a distinct class of materials.

=== Discovery of asteroids ===
The telescopic discovery of the first asteroids Ceres by Giuseppe Piazzi in 1801, Pallas by Heinrich Wilhelm Matthias Olbers in 1802 and Juno by Karl Ludwig Harding in 1804 revealed that the region between Mars and Jupiter contains small, planet-like bodies, from which rocky and metallic material could be delivered to Earth, providing a plausible extraterrestrial source for meteorites.

== List of meteorite falls ==
=== Historic falls (861–1794) ===
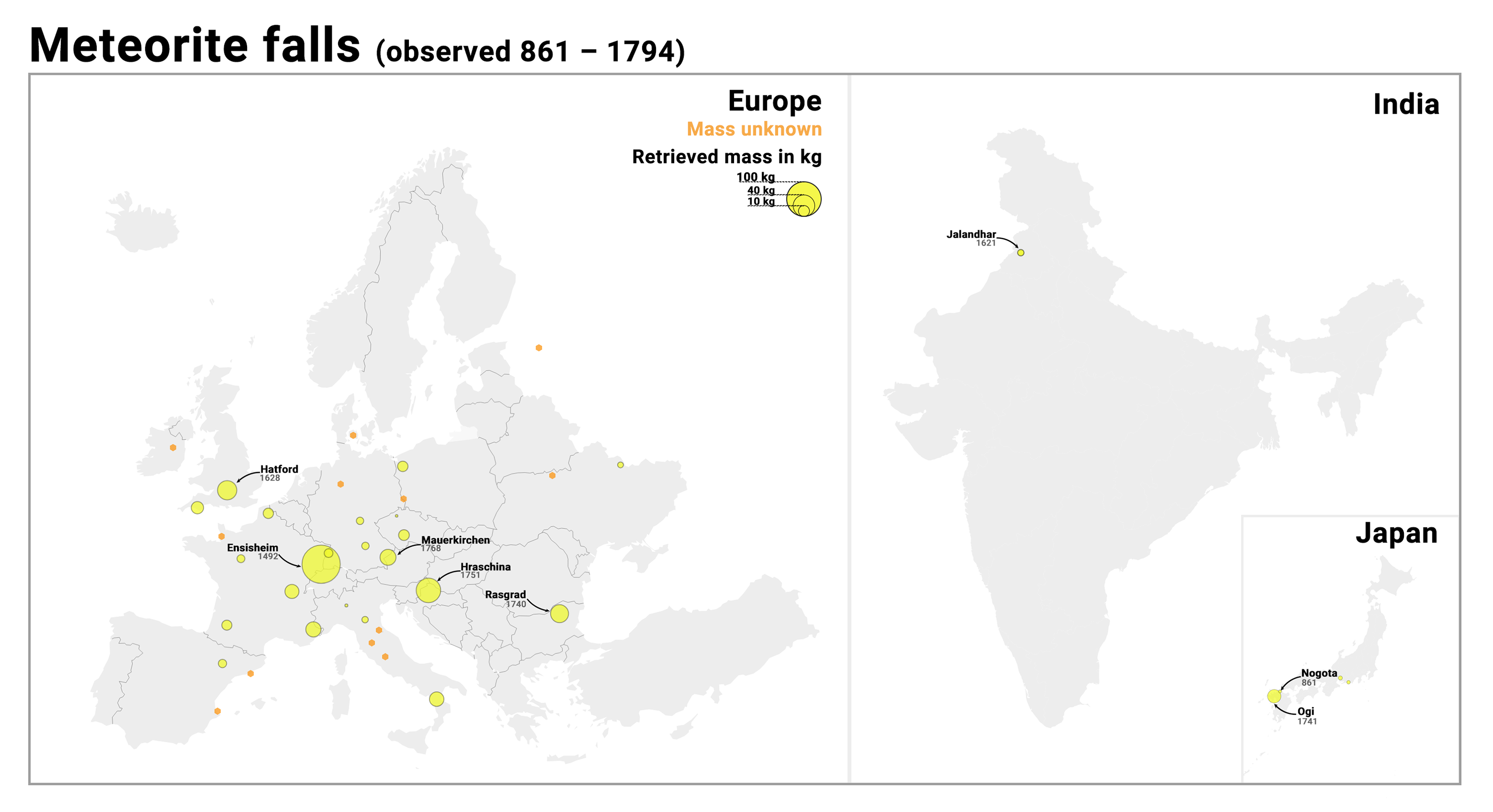
Map of historic meteorite falls from Europe, Japan and India. Shown are all 40 historically accepted observed meteorite falls before April 1794.

The table below lists all 40 historically accepted observed meteorite falls before April 1794, when Chladni published his book marking the beginning of meteoritics as a modern scientific field.

The table is based on the classification of the Meteoritical Bulletin Database maintained by the Meteoritical Society; however, unlike the meteorites of Nōgata, Ensisheim or Hraschina, not all are well-documented and only half of the listed meteorites are preserved to date.

Meteorite name	Meteorite link	Fall observation date	Country	State, province, or region	Classification	Mass	Preserved	Meteoritical Bulletin(s)
Nogata	Nogata	19 May 861	Japan	Kyūshū	L6	472 g	yes	
Narni		921	Italy	Umbria	Stone-uncl	—	no	
Rivolta de Bassi		22 March 1491	Italy	Lombardy	Stone-uncl	103.3 g	no	
Ensisheim	Ensisheim	7 November 1492	France	Grand Est	LL6	127 kg	yes	
Valdinoce		26 or 28 January 1496	Italy	Emilia-Romagna	Stone-uncl	—	no	
Oliva-Gandia		26 May 1520	Spain	Valencian Community	Stone-uncl	—	no	
Castrovillari		9 January 1583	Italy	Calabria	Stone-uncl	15 kg	no	
Jalandhar	Jalandhar	10 April 1621	India	Punjab	Iron	1967 g	yes	
Stretchleigh		10 January 1623	United Kingdom	England	Stone-uncl	10.4 kg	no	
Hatford		9 April 1628	United Kingdom	England	Stone-uncl	29 kg	no	
Minamino		27 September 1632	Japan	Chūbu	L	1040 g	yes	56
Sagan		6 March 1636	Poland	Lubusz Voivodeship	Stone-uncl	—	no	
Mount Vaisi		29 November 1637	France	Provence-Alpes-Côte d'Azur	Stone-uncl	17 kg	no	
Stolzenau		August 1647	Germany	Lower Saxony	Stone-uncl	—	no	
Fünen		30 March 1654	Denmark	Fyn	Stone-uncl	—	no	
Novy-Ergi		10 December 1662	Russia	Novgorod Oblast	Stone-uncl	—	no	
Vago		21 June 1668	Italy	Veneto	H6	40 g	yes	
Ortenau		27 February 1671	Germany	Baden-Württemberg	Stone-uncl	4.5 kg	no	
Sasagase		16 February 1704	Japan	Chūbu	H	695 g	yes	8
Barcelona (stone)		25 December 1704	Spain	Catalunya	L6	83.5 g	yes	108
Schellin		11 April 1715	Poland	West Pomeranian Voivodeship	L	7 kg	yes	
Ploschkovitz		22 June 1723	Czech Republic	Ústí nad Labem Region	L5	39 g	yes	
Rasgrad		25 October 1740	Bulgaria	Razgrad	Stone-uncl	24.7 kg	no	
Ogi	Ogi	8 June 1741	Japan	Kyūshū	H6	14.36 kg	yes	
Nicorps		11 October 1750	France	Normandy	Stone-uncl	—	no	
Hraschina	Hraschina	26 May 1751	Croatia	—	IID iron	49 kg	yes	
Tabor		3 July 1753	Czech Republic	South Bohemian Region	H5	7.54 kg	yes	33
Luponnas		7 September 1753	France	Auvergne-Rhône-Alpes	H3-5	14 kg	yes	
Albareto	Albareto	July 1766	Italy	Emilia-Romagna	L/LL4	2 kg	yes	
Lucé		13 September 1768	France	Pays de la Loire	L6	3.5 kg	yes	
Mauerkirchen		20 November 1768	Austria	Upper Austria	L6	19 kg	yes	108
Aire-sur-la-Lys		1769 Autumn	France	Hauts-de-France	unknown	6.8 kg	no	
Sena		17 November 1773	Spain	Aragon	H4	4 kg	yes	
Owrucz		1775 or 1776	Ukraine	Zhytomyr	OC	—	no	
Rodach		19 September 1775	Germany	Bavaria	Stone-uncl	2.9 kg	no	
Pettiswood		1779	Ireland	Leinster	Stone-uncl	—	no	
Eichstädt		19 February 1785	Germany	Bavaria	H5	3 kg	yes	
Kharkov		12 October 1787	Ukraine	Sumy	L6	1500 g	yes	
Barbotan		24 July 1790	France	Aquitaine	H5	6.4 kg	yes	
Castel Berardenga		17 May 1791	Italy	Tuscany	Stone-uncl	—	no	

=== Recent falls (since 1959) ===
The year 1959 marks the beginning of the era of instrumentally observed meteorite falls, with the meteorite of Přibram being the first. Before that, meteorite falls could only be observed by human eyes (and ears). As of October 2026, there have been 479 approved meteorites with observed falls found since the beginning of 1959.

Meteorite name (location)	Meteorite link	Fall observation date	Country	State, province, or region	Classification	Instrumentally observed - orbital data	Meteoritical Bulletin(s)
Wadsworth	Wadsworth	17 March 2026	United States	Ohio	Eucrite-mmict	No	115
Khemis Sidi Yahya		5 February 2026	Morocco	Khémisset	Aubrite	No	115
Tana River		24 December 2025	Kenya	Tana River County	L6	No	115
Okulovka		27 October 2025	Russia	Novgorodskaya	LL6	No	114
Jatilaba		5 October 2025	Indonesia	Jawa Tengah	L6	No	115
McDonough	McDonough	26 June 2025	United States	Georgia	L6	No	114
Maoming		28 May 2025	China	Guangdong	L6	No	114
Bordj Rhoraffa		20 May 2025	Algeria	El Oued	L6	No	114
Pindarri Punju Puri		11 May 2025	Australia	Western Australia	LL5	No	115
Khalwat Nimgaon		3 March 2025	India	Maharashtra	L5	No	115
Drelów		18 February 2025	Poland	Lublin Voivodeship	L6	No	114
Smalyavichy		25 December 2024	Belarus	Minsk	H6	No	114
Amo		10 December 2024	United States	Indiana	L5	No	114
Haag		24 October 2024	Austria	Niederösterreich	LL4-6	Yes	114
Scalea		11 September 2024	Italy	Calabria	L5	No	114
Nqweba		25 August 2024	South Africa	Eastern Cape	Howardite	No	114
Ait Saoun		6 August 2024	Morocco	Drâa-Tafilalet	EH3	No	113
Charlottetown	Charlottetown	25 July 2024	Canada	Prince Edward Island	H5	No	113
Hillsborough		16 July 2024	United States	New Jersey	CM1/2	Yes	115
Black Silver Mine		16 April 2024	United States	Arizona	CK6	No	114
Takapō		13 March 2024	New Zealand	Canterbury	L5	No	113
Ribbeck	2024 BX1	21 January 2024	Germany	Brandenburg	Aubrite	Yes	113
La Posa Plain		28 December 2023	United States	Arizona	LL3-6	Yes	113
Raja		23 December 2023	Oman	Al Wusta	EH3	Yes	113
Boorama		6 December 2023	Somalia	Awdal	CO3	No	113
Ménétréol-sur-Sauldre		10 September 2023	France	Cher	H5	Yes	115
Boutel Fil		8 July 2023	Chad	Chari-Baguirmi	LL6	No	112
Titusville		8 May 2023	United States	New Jersey	H6	No	114
Elmshorn		25 April 2023	Germany	Schleswig-Holstein	H3-6	No	112
El Menia		11 March 2023	Algeria	Ghardaia	L5	No	112
Oued el Kechbi		3 March 2023	Morocco	Laâyoune-Sakia El Hamra	L4	No	112
El Sauz		15 February 2023	United States	Texas	L6	No	112
Matera		14 February 2023	Italy	Basilicata	H5	No	113
Saint-Pierre-le-Viger	2023 CX1	13 February 2023	France	Normandy	L5-6	Yes	112
Kopargaon		24 January 2023	India	Maharashtra	LL5	No	112
Mvskoke Merkv		20 January 2023	United States	Oklahoma	L6	No	113
Tanxi		15 December 2022	China	Zhejiang	H6	No	112
Menisa		October 2022	Canada	Alberta	L6	No	112
Junction City		26 September 2022	United States	Georgia	L5	No	113
Rantila		17 August 2022	India	Gujarat	Aubrite	No	112
Great Salt Lake		13 August 2022	United States	Utah	H5	No	111
Estreito		25 July 2022	Brazil	Bahia	H4-6	No	114
Longde		10 July 2022	China	Ningxia	L5	No	111
Portelândia		7 July 2022	Brazil	Goias	L5	No	114
Pusté Úlany		25 June 2022	Slovakia	Trnava	H5	Yes	113
Ponggo		20 May 2022	Philippines	Cagayan Valley	H3-5	No	111
Cranfield		27 April 2022	United States	Mississippi	H3-5	No	111
Al-Khadhaf		8 March 2022	Oman	Zufar	H5-6	Yes	112
Loro		24 December 2021	Uganda	Oyam	L6	No	112
Tiglit		9 December 2021	Morocco	Assa-Zag	Aubrite	No	111
Msied		16 November 2021	Morocco	Tan-Tan	H4-6	No	111
Golden		4 October 2021	Canada	British Columbia	L/LL5	Yes	111
Taghzout		6 August 2021	Morocco	Al Hoceima	H5	Yes	113
Antonin		15 July 2021	Poland	Kalisz	L4-5	Yes	111
Ramon de las Yaguas		10 July 2021	Cuba	Santiago de Cuba	L6	No	115
Winchcombe	Winchcombe	28 February 2021	United Kingdom	England	CM2	Yes	110
Punggur		28 January 2021	Indonesia	Lampung	H7-melt breccia	No	110
Traspena		18 January 2021	Spain	Galicia	L5	Yes	111
Qiquanhu		15 January 2021	China	Xinjiang	Eucrite	No	111
Kindberg		19 November 2020	Austria	Styria	L6	Yes	110
Djadjarm		4 November 2020	Iran	North Khorasan	L6	No	110
Tarda		25 August 2020	Morocco		C2 (ungrouped)	No	109
Santa Filomena		19 August 2020	Brazil	Pernambuco	H5-6	Yes	109
Kolang		1 August 2020	Indonesia	Sumatera Utara	CM1/2	No	109
Narashino		2 July 2020	Japan	Kanto	H5	Yes	109
Madura Cave		19 June 2020	Australia	Western Australia	L5	Yes	110
Tiros		8 May 2020	Brazil	Minas Gerais	Howardite	No	109
Gatuto		24 April 2020	Kenya	Central Province	L6	No	109
Tihigrin		April 2020	Mali	Gao	L4	No	110
Novo Mesto		28 February 2020	Slovenia	Jugovzhodna Slovenija	L5	Yes	109
Zhob		9 January 2020	Pakistan	Baluchistan	H3-4	No	109
Cavezzo		1 January 2020	Italy	Emilia-Romagna	L5-an	Yes	109
Puli Ilkaringuru		18 November 2019	Australia	Western Australia	H5	Yes	112
Flensburg		12 September 2019	Germany	Schleswig-Holstein	C1 (ungrouped)	Yes	109
Al Farciya		20 August 2019	Western Sahara		L6	No	109
Taqtaq-e Rasoul		10 August 2019	Iran	Kermanshah	H5	No	108
Mahadeva		22 July 2019	India	Bihar	H5	No	109
Wad Lahteyba		27 June 2019	Western Sahara		H5	No	109
Arpu Kuilpu		2 June 2019	Australia	South Australia	H5	Yes	110
Oued Sfayat		16 May 2019	Algeria	Tindouf	H5	No	108
Aguas Zarcas		23 April 2019	Costa Rica	Alajuela	CM2	Yes	108
Viñales	Viñales	1 February 2019	Cuba	Pinar del Rio	L6	Yes	108
Mhabes el Hamra		23 December 2018	Mauritania	Tiris Zemmour	H4/5	No	108
Ksar El Goraane		28 October 2018	Morocco	Drâa-Tafilalet	H5	No	108
Komaki		26 September 2018	Japan	Chubu	L6	No	108
Gueltat Zemmour		21 August 2018	Western Sahara		L4	No	107
Benenitra		27 July 2018	Madagascar	Atsimo-Andrefana	L6	No	108
Glendale		26 July 2018	United States	Arizona	L6	No	110
Renchen		10 July 2018	Germany	Baden-Württemberg	L5-6	Yes	107
Ozerki		21 June 2018	Russia	Lipetsk Oblast	L6	Yes	107
Motopi Pan	2018 LA	2 June 2018	Botswana	Ghanzi	Howardite	Yes	110
Mangui		1 June 2018	China	Yunnan	L6	No	107
Aba Panu		19 April 2018	Nigeria	Oyo	L3	No	107
Ablaketka		16 February 2018	Kazakhstan	East Kazakhstan	H5	No	107
Hamburg		16 January 2018	United States	Michigan	H4	Yes	107
Matarka		5 January 2018	Morocco	Oriental	L6	No	109
Shidian		27 November 2017	China	Yunnan	CM2	No	108
Kheneg Ljouâd		12 July 2017	Morocco	Souss-Massa	LL5/6	No	106
Serra Pelada	Serra Pelada	29 June 2017	Brazil	Pará	Eucrite	No	106
Mukundpura		6 June 2017	India	Rajasthan	CM2	No	107
Natun Balijan		5 June 2017	India	Assam	L4	No	108
Tres Irmaos		26 May 2017	Brazil	Bahia	L6	No	106
San Pedro de Urabá		16 February 2017	Colombia	Antioquia	L6	No	107
Broek in Waterland		11 January 2017	Netherlands	Noord-Holland	L6	No	106
Aiquile		20 November 2016	Bolivia	Cochabamba	H5	No	106
Oudiyat Sbaa		18 November 2016	Western Sahara		EH5	No	106
Dingle Dell	Dingle Dell	31 October 2016	Australia	Western Australia	LL6	Yes	106
Mazichuan		16 September 2016	China	Shaanxi	Diogenite	No	107
Banma		24 August 2016	China	Qinghai	L5	No	105
Dishchii'bikoh		2 June 2016	United States	Arizona	LL7	Yes	106
Hradec Králové		17 May 2016	Czech Republic	Hradec Králové Region	LL5	Yes	106
Degtevo		20 March 2016	Russia	Rostov Oblast	H5	No	106
Stubenberg		6 March 2016	Germany	Bayern	LL6	Yes	105
Mount Blanco		18 February 2016	United States	Texas	L5	No	105
Ejby		6 February 2016	Denmark	Hovedstaden	H5/6	Yes	105
Osceola		24 January 2016	United States	Florida	L6	Yes	105
Murrili	Murrili	27 November 2015	Australia	South Australia	H5	Yes	105
Kamargaon		13 November 2015	India	Assam	L6	No	105
Creston		23 October 2015	United States	California	L6	Yes	104
Sariçiçek		2 September 2015	Turkey	Bingöl	Howardite	Yes	105
Moshampa		30 July 2015	Iran	Zanjan	LL5	No	105
Sidi Ali Ou Azza		28 July 2015	Morocco	Souss-Massa	L4	No	105
Botohilitano		20 July 2015	Indonesia	Sumatera Utara	LL5	No	111
Famenin		27 June 2015	Iran	Hamadan	H/L3	No	104
Porangaba		9 January 2015	Brazil	São Paulo	L4	Yes	104
Žd'ár nad Sázavou		9 December 2014	Czech Republic	Vysočina Region	L3	Yes	104
Tinajdad		9 September 2014	Morocco	Drâa-Tafilalet	H5	No	103
Andila		21 August 2014	Chad	Ouaddai	L6	No	107
Tirhert		9 July 2014	Morocco	Souss-Massa	Eucrite (unbrecciated)	No	103
Annama		19 April 2014	Russia	Murmansk	H5	Yes	104
Jinju		9 March 2014	South Korea	South Gyeongsang	H5	No	103
Kuresoi		27 February 2014	Kenya	Rift Valley	L6	No	103
Parauapebas		9 December 2013	Brazil	Pará	H4-5	No	107
Mahbas Arraid		9 December 2013	Western Sahara	Guelmim-Es Semara	LL6	No	107
Vicência		21 September 2013	Brazil	Pernambuco	LL3.2	No	103
Aouinet Legraa		17 July 2013	Algeria	Tindouf	Eucrite (unbrecciated)	No	105
Braunschweig	Braunschweig	23 April 2013	Germany	Lower Saxony	L6	No	102
Wolcott		19 April 2013	United States	Connecticut	L5	No	103
Chelyabinsk	Chelyabinsk	15 February 2013	Russia	Chelyabinsk	LL5	Yes	102
Mreïra		16 December 2012	Mauritania	Tiris Zemmour	L6	No	102
Addison		30 October 2012	United States	Alabama	H4	No	113
Izarzar		23 October 2012	Morocco	Souss-Massa	H5	No	104
Novato	Novato	17 October 2012	United States	California	L6	Yes	103
Battle Mountain	Battle Mountain	22 August 2012	United States	Nevada	L6	No	101
Jalangi		8 July 2012	India	West Bengal	L5/6	No	108
Katol	Katol	22 May 2012	India	Maharashtra	L6	No	102
Ladkee		4 May 2012	Pakistan	Sind	H6	No	102
Sutter's Mill	Sutter's Mill	22 April 2012	United States	California	C	Yes	100
Oslo		9 March 2012	Norway	Oslo	H3-6	No	109
Xining		11 February 2012	China	Qinghai	L5	No	102
Boumdeid (2011)		14 September 2011	Mauritania	Assaba	L6	No	102
Tissint	Tissint	18 July 2011	Morocco	Tata	Martian (shergottite)	No	100
Thika		16 July 2011	Kenya	Central Province	L6	No	100
Draveil		13 July 2011	France	Île-de-France	H5	No	102
Sołtmany	Sołtmany	30 April 2011	Poland	Warmian–Masurian Voivodeship	L6	No	100
Orconuma	Orconuma	7 March 2011	Philippines	Mimaropa	H3-4	No	110
Križevci		4 February 2011	Croatia		H6	Yes	103
Huaxi		13 July 2010	China	Guizhou	H5	No	100
Trâpeăng Rônoăs		4 July 2010	Cambodia	Kampong Speu province	H4	No	104
Varre-Sai	Varre-Sai	19 June 2010	Brazil	Rio de Janeiro	L5	No	99
Mifflin	Mifflin	14 April 2010	United States	Wisconsin	L5	No	99
Mason Gully	Mason Gully	13 April 2010	Australia	Western Australia	H5	Yes	99
Košice		28 February 2010	Slovakia	Košice Region	H5	Yes	100
Lorton		18 January 2010	United States	Virginia	L6	No	99
Grimsby		26 September 2009	Canada	Ontario	H5	Yes	97
Whetstone Mountains		23 June 2009	United States	Arizona	H5	No	99
Karimati		28 May 2009	India	Uttar Pradesh	L5	No	107
Jesenice		9 April 2009	Slovenia	Upper Carniola	L6	Yes	98
Cartersville		1 March 2009	United States	Georgia	L5	No	104
Nkayi		1 March 2009	Zimbabwe	Matabeleland North	L6	No	104
Ash Creek		15 February 2009	United States	Texas	L6	No	96
Maribo		17 January 2009	Denmark	Zealand	CM2	Yes	96
Tamdakht	Tamdakht	20 December 2008	Morocco	Drâa-Tafilalet	H5	No	95
Buzzard Coulee	Buzzard Coulee	20 November 2008	Canada	Saskatchewan	H4	Yes	95
Almahata Sitta	Almahata Sitta	7 October 2008	Sudan	River Nile State	Ureilite-anomalous	Yes	96
Sulagiri	Sulagiri	12 September 2008	India	Tamil Nadu	LL6	No	96
Pleşcoi		12 June 2008	Romania	Buzău County	L5-6	No	98
Xinglongquan		12 April 2008	China	Hebei	L3	No	104
Berduc		7 April 2008	Argentina	Entre Ríos	L6	No	
Daule		23 March 2008	Ecuador	Guayas	L5	No	
Kemer		3 March 2008	Turkey	Muğla	L4	No	
Santa Lucia (2008)		23 January 2008	Argentina	San Juan	L6	No	
Sokoto		10 January 2008	Nigeria	Sokoto	IIIAB iron	No	107
San Juan de Ocotán		22 September 2007	Mexico	Jalisco	L5	No	104
Carancas	Carancas	15 September 2007	Peru	Puno	H4-5	No	
Red Canyon Lake		11 August 2007	United States	California	H5	No	
Bunburra Rockhole	Bunburra Rockhole	21 July 2007	Australia	South Australia	Eucrite	Yes	95
Cali		6 July 2007	Colombia	Valle del Cauca	H/L4	Yes	93
Chergach	Chergach	2 July 2007	Mali	Taoudénit	H5	No	94
Puerto Lápice		10 May 2007	Spain	Castilla–La Mancha	Eucrite (brecciated)	No	
Khane Zenian		9 March 2007	Iran	Fars	H3	No	113
Mahadevpur		21 February 2007	India	Arunachal Pradesh	H4/5	No	
Didim		1 February 2007	Turkey	Aydın	H3-5	No	
Demsa		31 October 2006	Nigeria	Adamawa	H6	No	103
Bassikounou	Bassikounou	16 October 2006	Mauritania	Hodh ech Chargui	H5	No	
Kavarpura		29 August 2006	India	Rajasthan	IIE iron (anomalous)	No	
Jodiya		31 July 2006	India	Gujarat	L5	No	
Moss	Moss	14 July 2006	Norway	Østfold	CO3.6	No	
Werdama		21 May 2006	Libya	Al-Jabal Al-Akhdar	H5	No	
Benguerir		22 November 2004	Morocco	Tensift	LL6	No	
Orlando		8 November 2004	United States	Florida	Eucrite	No	
Kaprada		28 October 2004	India	Gujarat	L5/6	No	
Berthoud		5 October 2004	United States	Colorado	Eucrite-mmict	No	
Maigatari-Danduma		1 August 2004	Niger	Zinder	H5/6	No	
Auckland	Auckland	12 June 2004	New Zealand	Auckland	L5	No	109
Villalbeto de la Peña		4 January 2004	Spain	Castile and León	L6	Yes	88
Kasauli		2 November 2003	India	Uttar Pradesh	H4	No	
Ouadangou		November 2003	Burkina Faso	Gnagna	L5	No	102
Oum Dreyga		16 October 2003	Western Sahara	Rio de Oro	H3-5	No	
Kendrapara		27 September 2003	India	Orissa	H4-5	No	
Boumdeid (2003)		24 September 2003	Mauritania	Tagant	L6	No	102
New Orleans		23 September 2003	United States	Louisiana	H5	No	
Hoima		30 March 2003	Uganda	Western	H6	No	
Park Forest	Park Forest	26 March 2003	United States	Illinois	L5	Yes	87
Kalugalatenna		19 February 2003	Sri Lanka	Central	L6	No	106
Hiroshima		1 February 2003	Japan	Chūgoku	H5	No	
Tepetates		5 September 2002	Mexico	Durango	H5	No	114
Kilabo		21 July 2002	Nigeria	Jigawa	LL6	No	
Thuathe		21 July 2002	Lesotho	Berea	H4/5	No	
Maromandia		5 July 2002	Madagascar	Sofia Region	L6	No	
Dongyang		June 2002	China	Zhejiang	H5	No	102
Bhawad		6 June 2002	India	Rajasthan	LL6	No	
Neuschwanstein	Neuschwanstein	6 April 2002	Germany	Bavaria	EL6	Yes	87
San Michele		20 February 2002	Italy	Marche	L6	No	
Bensour		11 February 2002	Morocco	Souss-Massa	LL6	No	
Alby sur Chéran		February 2002	France	Auvergne-Rhône-Alpes	Eucrite-mmict	No	
Bukhara		9 July 2001	Uzbekistan	Bukhara	CV3	No	
Dergaon		2 March 2001	India	Assam	H5	No	
Devgaon		12 February 2001	India	Madhya Pradesh	H3.8	No	
Al Zarnkh		8 February 2001	Sudan	Kurdufan	LL5	No	
Beni M'hira		8 January 2001	Tunisia	Tataouine	L6	No	
Gasseltepaoua		22 August 2000	Burkina Faso	Soum	H5	No	
Yafa		15 July 2000	Yemen	Abyan	H5	No	
Morávka		6 May 2000	Czech Republic	Moravian-Silesian Region	H5	Yes	85
Tagish Lake	Tagish Lake	18 January 2000	Canada	British Columbia	C2 (ungrouped)	Yes	84
Dunbogan		14 December 1999	Australia	New South Wales	L6	No	
Leighlinbridge	Leighlinbridge	28 November 1999	Ireland	Leinster	L6	No	
Djoumine		31 October 1999	Tunisia	Bizerte	H5-6	No	
Bilanga		27 October 1999	Burkina Faso	Gnagna	Diogenite	No	
Kobe		26 September 1999	Japan	Kinki	CK4	No	
Katagum		September 1999	Nigeria	Bauchi	L6	No	
Sabrum		30 April 1999	India	Tripura	LL6	No	
Ourique	Ourique	28 December 1998	Portugal	Beja	H4	No	
Heyetang		October 1998	China	Hunan	L3	No	112
Chadong		17 September 1998	China	Hunan	L6	No	
Dashoguz		5 September 1998	Turkmenistan	Daşoguz	H5	No	
Zag		4 August 1998 or 5	Western Sahara	Saguia el-Hamra	H3-6	No	
Kitchener		12 July 1998	Canada	Ontario	L6	No	
Kunya-Urgench		20 June 1998	Turkmenistan	Daşoguz	H5	No	
Portales Valley		13 June 1998	United States	New Mexico	H6	No	
Indian Butte		7 June 1998	United States	Arizona	H5	No	102
Monahans (1998)		22 March 1998	United States	Texas	H5	No	
Elbert	Elbert	11 January 1998	United States	Colorado	LL6	No	
Tocache		1 January 1998	Peru	San Martín	H5	No	108
Vissannapeta		13 December 1997	India	Andhra Pradesh	Eucrite (cumulate)	No	
Worden		1 September 1997	United States	Michigan	L5	No	
Juancheng		15 February 1997	China	Shandong	H5	No	
Guangmingshan		30 December 1996	China	Liaoning	H5	No	
Turtle Lake		21 October 1996	United States	Wisconsin	L5	No	
Fermo		25 September 1996	Italy	Marche	H3-5	No	
Piplia Kalan		20 June 1996	India	Rajasthan	Eucrite-mmict	No	
Tsukuba		7 January 1996	Japan	Kanto	H5-6	No	
Dong Ujimqin Qi		7 September 1995	China	Inner Mongolia	Mesosiderite	No	
Pétèlkolé		10 April 1995	Niger	Tillabéri	H5	No	
Silao		12 March 1995	Mexico	Guanajuato	H5	No	
Neagari		18 February 1995	Japan	Chūbu	L6	No	
Galkiv		12 January 1995	Ukraine	Chernihiv	H4	No	
Talampaya		1995 (approx.)	Argentina	La Rioja	Eucrite (cumulate)	No	
New Halfa		8 November 1994	Sudan	Kassala	L4	No	
Lujiang		1 November 1994	China	Anhui	LL6	No	113
Devri-Khera		30 October 1994	India	Madhya Pradesh	L6	No	
Lohawat		30 October 1994	India	Rajasthan	Howardite	No	
Coleman		20 October 1994	United States	Michigan	L6	No	
Baszkówka	Baszkówka	25 August 1994	Poland	Masovian Voivodeship	L5	No	
St-Robert	St-Robert	14 June 1994	Canada	Quebec	H5	No	
El Tigre		23 December 1993	Mexico	Michoacan	L6	No	
Songyuan		15 August 1993	China	Jilin	L6	No	
Ban Rong Du		13 June 1993	Thailand	Phetchabun	Iron (ungrouped)	No	
Senboku		1993	Japan	Tohoku	H6	No	
Mihonoseki		10 December 1992	Japan	Chūgoku	L6	No	
Peekskill	Peekskill	9 October 1992	United States	New York	H6	Yes	
Mbale		14 August 1992	Uganda	Eastern	L5/6	No	
Noblesville		31 August 1991	United States	Indiana	H4-6	No	
Mount Tazerzait		21 August 1991	Niger	Agadez	L5	No	
Benešov		7 May 1991	Czech Republic	Central Bohemian Region	H5	Yes	100
Glatton		5 May 1991	United Kingdom	England	L6	No	
Tahara		26 March 1991	Japan	Chūbu	H4/5	No	
Campos Sales		31 January 1991	Brazil	Ceara	L5	No	78
Yanzhuang		31 October 1990	China	Guangdong	H6	No	
Burnwell	Burnwell	4 September 1990	United States	Kentucky	H4-an	No	
Jalanash		15 August 1990	Mongolia	—	Ureilite	No	
Magombedze		2 July 1990	Zimbabwe	Masvingo	H3-5	No	
Sterlitamak		17 May 1990	Russia	Bashkortostan	IIIAB iron	No	
Glanerbrug		7 April 1990	Netherlands	Overijssel	L/LL5	No	
Quija		20 March 1990	China	Jilin	H6	No	
Bawku		29 December 1989	Ghana	Upper East	LL5	No	
Sfax		16 October 1989	Tunisia	Sfax	L6	No	
Sivas		30 September 1989	Turkey	Yozgat	H6	No	
Sixiangkou		15 August 1989	China	Jiangsu	L5	No	
Uchkuduk		21 June 1989	Uzbekistan	Navoiy Region	L6	No	
Pê		14 June 1989	Burkina Faso	Houet	L6	No	
El Idrissia		10 March 1989	Algeria	Djelfa	L6	No	
Palca de Aparzo		14 September 1988	Argentina	Jujuy	L5	No	
Ceniceros		20 August 1988	Mexico	Durango	L3.7	No	
Chela		12 July 1988	Tanzania	Shinyanga	H4	No	
Torino		18 May 1988	Italy	Piemonte	H6	No	
Trebbin		1 March 1988	Germany	Brandenburg	LL6	No	
Chisenga		17 January 1988	Malawi	Northern	IIIAB iron	No	
Laochenzhen		23 February 1987	China	Henan	H5	No	
Raghunathpura		20 November 1986	India	Rajasthan	IIAB iron	No	
Undulung		11 September 1986	Russia	Sakha Republic	L4	No	
Wuan		31 July 1986	China	Hebei	H6	No	
Kokubunji		29 July 1986	Japan	Shikoku	L6	No	
Lanxi		10 June 1986	China	Heilongjiang	L6	No	
Sayama		29 April 1986	Japan	Kantō	CM2	No	
Suizhou	Suizhou	15 April 1986	China	Hubei	L6	No	
Oued el Hadjar		April 1986	Morocco	Souss-Massa	LL6	No	
Tianzhang		28 January 1986	China	Anhui	H5	No	
Salzwedel		14 November 1985	Germany	Sachsen-Anhalt	LL5	No	
La Criolla		6 January 1985	Argentina	Entre Ríos	L6	No	
Claxton	Claxton	10 December 1984	United States	Georgia	L6	No	63
Zhaodong		25 October 1984	China	Heilongjiang	L4	No	
Zaoyang		18 October 1984	China	Hubei	H5	No	
Binningup		30 September 1984	Australia	Western Australia	H5	No	
Tomiya		22 August 1984	Japan	Tohoku	H4/5	No	
Aomori		30 June 1984	Japan	Tohoku	L6	No	
Nantong		15 June 1984	China	Jiangsu	H6	No	
Gujba		3 April 1984	Nigeria	Yobe	CBa	No	
Gashua		April 1984	Nigeria	Yobe	L6	No	
Jumapalo		13 March 1984	Indonesia	Jawa Timur	L6	No	
Rahimyar Khan		December 1983	Pakistan	Punjab	L5	No	
Ningqiang		25 June 1983	China	Shaanxi	C3 (ungrouped)	No	
Guangnan		7 February 1983	China	Yunnan	L6	No	
Maryville		28 January 1983	United States	Tennessee	L6	No	
Kidairat		January 1983	Sudan	Kurdufan	H6	No	
Wethersfield (1982)		8 November 1982	United States	Connecticut	L6	No	
Gujargaon		4 September 1982	India	Madhya Pradesh	H5	No	
Qidong	Qidong	2 July 1982	China	Jiangsu	L/LL5	No	
Chiang Khan		17 November 1981	Thailand	Loei	H6	No	
Akyumak		2 August 1981	Turkey	Ağrı	IVA iron	No	
Omolon	Omolon	16 May 1981	Russia	Magadan Oblast	Pallasite, PMG	No	
Salem		13 May 1981	United States	Oregon	L6	No	
Dahmani		May 1981	Tunisia	Kasserine	LL6	No	
Gursum		10 February 1981	Ethiopia	Hararghe	H4/5	No	
Machinga		22 January 1981	Malawi	Southern	L6	No	
Kaidun	Kaidun	3 December 1980	Yemen	Hadhramaut	CR2	No	
Richland Springs		20 September 1980	United States	Texas	H5	No	115
Mianchi		4 September 1980	China	Henan	H5	No	
Xi Ujimgin		24 August 1980	China	Inner Mongolia	L/LL6-an	No	
Guangrao		21 June 1980	China	Shandong	L6	No	
Lunan		4 April 1980	China	Yunnan	H6	No	
Cilimus		7 May 1979	Indonesia	Jawa Barat	L5	No	
Jartai		15 March 1979	China	Inner Mongolia	L6	No	
Nuevo Mercurio		15 December 1978	Mexico	Zacatecas	H5	No	
Lishui		10 September 1978	China	Jiangsu	L5	No	
Chitenay		21 February 1978	France	Centre-Val de Loire	L6	No	
Xingyang		1 December 1977	China	Henan	H6	No	
Kutais		28 November 1977	Russia	Krasnodar Krai	H5	No	
El Paso de Aguila		November 1977	Mexico	Tamaulipas	H5	No	
Bo Xian		20 October 1977	China	Anhui	LL3.9	No	
Iguaracu		October 1977	Brazil	Parana	H5	No	
Alta'ameem		20 August 1977	Iraq	Kirkuk	LL5	No	
Ankazomena		30 July 1977	Madagascar	Mahajanga	CVox3	No	113
Fuyang		June 1977	China	Anhui	Stone-uncl	No	
Changde		11 March 1977	China	Hunan	H5	No	
Innisfree		5 February 1977	Canada	Alberta	L5	Yes	55
Louisville		31 January 1977	United States	Kentucky	L6	No	
Ruhobobo		13 October 1976	Rwanda	Northern Province	L6	No	
Qingzhen		13 September 1976	China	Guizhou	EH3	No	
Zhuanghe		18 August 1976	China	Liaoning	H5	No	
Acapulco	Acapulco	11 August 1976	Mexico	Guerrero	Acapulcoite	No	
Sheyang		11 July 1976	China	Jiangsu	L6	No	
Dunhua		9 July 1976	China	Jilin	Stone-uncl	No	
Junan		15 May 1976	China	Shandong	L6	No	
Dowa		25 March 1976	Malawi	Central	Stone-uncl	No	
Jilin		8 March 1976	China	Jilin	H5	No	
Dhajala		28 January 1976	India	Gujarat	H3.8	No	
Grefsheim		25 January 1976 or 31	Norway	Innlandet	L5	No	
Udaipur		1976	India	Rajasthan	H3	No	
Tuxtuac		16 October 1975	Mexico	Zacatecas	LL5	No	
Ningbo		4 October 1975	China	Zhejiang	IVA iron	No	
Ijopega		3 March 1975	Papua New Guinea	Eastern Highlands	H6	No	
Tambakwatu		14 February 1975	Indonesia	Jawa Timur	L6	No	
Enshi		26 December 1974	China	Hubei	H5	No	
Naragh		18 August 1974	Iran	Isfahan province	H6	No	
Mayo Belwa		3 August 1974	Nigeria	Adamawa	Aubrite	No	
Gorlovka		17 July 1974	Ukraine	Donetsk	H3.7	No	54
Stratford		27 May 1974	United States	Connecticut	L6	No	
Aioun el Atrouss		17 April 1974	Mauritania	Hodh el Gharbi	Diogenite-pm	No	
Jolomba		3 February 1974	Angola	Huambo	LL6	No	
Canon City		27 October 1973	United States	Colorado	H6	No	
Lichtenberg		26 September 1973	South Africa	North West	H6	No	58
San Juan Capistrano		15 March 1973	United States	California	H6	No	
Natal		1973	South Africa	—	Stone-uncl	No	
Ipiranga		27 December 1972	Brazil	Parana	H6	No	
Valera		15 October 1972	Venezuela	Trujillo	L5	No	
Guibga		26 February 1972	Burkina Faso	Namentenga	L5	No	
Marilia	Marilia	5 October 1971	Brazil	São Paulo	H4	No	
Haverö		2 August 1971	Finland	Southwest Finland	Ureilite	No	
Shuangyang		25 May 1971 or 26	China	Jilin	H5	No	
Noventa Vicentina		12 May 1971	Italy	Veneto	H4	No	
Anlong	Anlong	2 May 1971	China	Guizhou	H5	No	
Kabo		25 April 1971	Nigeria	Kano	H4	No	
Wethersfield (1971)		8 April 1971	United States	Connecticut	L6	No	
Tintigny		February 1971	Belgium	Luxembourg	Eucrite-pmict	No	107
Ischgl		24 November 1970	Austria	Tyrol	LL6	Yes	101, 115
Kiffa		23 October 1970	Mauritania	Assaba	H5	No	
Dwaleni		12 October 1970	Swaziland	Shiselweni	H4-6	No	
Malakal		August 1970	South Sudan	Upper Nile	L5	No	
Nejo		11 May 1970	Ethiopia	Welega	L6	No	
Tillaberi		April 1970	Niger	Tillaberi	L6	No	
Dongtai		20 January 1970	China	Jiangsu	LL6	No	
Ucera		16 January 1970	Venezuela	Falcón	H5	No	
Lost City		3 January 1970	United States	Oklahoma	H5	Yes	
Patora		20 October 1969	India	Madhya Pradesh	H6	No	
Murchison	Murchison	28 September 1969	Australia	Victoria	CM2	No	
Suchy Dul		16 September 1969	Czech Republic	Hradec Králové Region	L6	No	
Andreevka		7 August 1969	Ukraine	Donetsk	L3	No	54
Bovedy	Bovedy	25 April 1969	United Kingdom	Northern Ireland	L3	No	
Allende	Allende	8 February 1969	Mexico	Chihuahua	CV3	No	
San Pedro Jacuaro		1 December 1968	Mexico	Michoacan	LL6	No	
Juromenha		14 November 1968	Portugal	Évora	IIIAB iron	No	
Piancaldoli		10 August 1968	Italy	Emilia-Romagna	LL3.4	No	
Awere		12 July 1968	Uganda	Northern	L4	No	
Schenectady		12 April 1968	United States	New York	H5	No	
Kingai		7 November 1967	Sudan	Darfur	H6	No	
Tathlith		5 October 1967	Saudi Arabia	'Asir	L6	No	
Wiluna		2 September 1967	Australia	Western Australia	H5	No	
Buritizal		14 August 1967	Brazil	São Paulo	LL3.2	No	105
Niger (L6)		1 August 1967	Niger	—	L6	No	111
Parambu		24 July 1967	Brazil	Ceara	LL5	No	
Denver		July 1967	United States	Colorado	L6	No	
Tugalin-Bulen		13 February 1967	Mongolia	Dundgovi	H6	No	
Vilna		5 February 1967	Canada	Alberta	L5	No	
Umm Ruaba		27 December 1966	Sudan	Kurdufan	L5	No	
Chitado		20 October 1966	Angola	Cunene	L6	No	
Saint-Séverin		27 June 1966	France	Poitou-Charentes	LL6	No	
Pavel		28 February 1966	Bulgaria	Veliko Tarnov	H5	No	36
Seoni		16 January 1966	India	Madhya Pradesh	H6	No	
Barwell		24 December 1965	United Kingdom	England	L5	No	
Conquista		December 1965	Brazil	Minas Gerais	H4	No	
Revelstoke		31 March 1965	Canada	British Columbia	CI1	No	
Taonan		28 February 1965	China	Jilin	L5	No	
Granes		13 November 1964	France	Languedoc-Roussillon	L6	No	
Changxing		17 October 1964	China	Zhejiang	H5	No	102
Jiange		9 October 1964	China	Sichuan	H5	No	
Çanakkale		July 1964	Turkey	Çanakkale	L6	No	
Muzaffarpur		11 April 1964	India	Bihar	IAB complex iron	No	
Bulls Run		1964	South Africa	—	Iron (?)	No	
Chernyi Bor		1964 Summer	Belarus	Mogilev	H4	No	
Wolamo		1964 (before)	Ethiopia	Shewa	OC	No	
Zaisan		18 December 1963	Kazakhstan	Abai Region	H5	No	
Karatu		11 September 1963	Tanzania	Arusha	LL6	No	
Usti nad Orlici		12 June 1963	Czech Republic	Pardubice Region	L6	No	
Ohuma		11 April 1963	Nigeria	Benue State	L5	No	
Peace River	Peace River	31 March 1963	Canada	Alberta	L6	No	
Hoxie		1963 (before)	United States	Kansas	OC	No	
Inner Mongolia		1963 or 1962	China	Inner Mongolia	L6	No	
Zagami	Zagami	3 October 1962	Nigeria	Katsina	Martian (shergottite)	No	
Bogou		14 August 1962	Burkina Faso (?)	Gourma (?)	IAB complex iron	No	25
São Jose do Rio Preto		14 August 1962	Brazil	São Paulo	H4	No	
Desuri		18 July 1962	India	Rajasthan	H6	No	
Ste. Marguerite		8 June 1962	France	Hauts-de-France	H4	No	24
Kiel		26 April 1962	Germany	Schleswig-Holstein	L6	No	
Dosso		19 February 1962	Niger	Dosso	L6	No	
Bells		9 September 1961	United States	Texas	C2 (ungrouped)	No	
Ehole		31 August 1961	Angola	Cunene	H5	No	23
Harleton		30 May 1961	United States	Texas	L6	No	22
Kayakent		April 1961	Turkey	Eskişehir	IIIAB iron	No	40
Kulak		25 March 1961	Pakistan	Baluchistan	L5	No	52
Djermaia		25 February 1961	Chad	Chari-Baguirmi	H3-6	No	30, 88, 112
Ras Tanura		23 February 1961	Saudi Arabia	Eastern (a.k.a. Ash Sharqiyah)	H6	No	21
Woolgorong		20 December 1960	Australia	Western Australia	L6	No	33
Millbillillie	Millbillillie	October 1960	Australia	Western Australia	Eucrite-mmict	No	51
Gao-Guenie	Gao–Guenie	5 March 1960	Burkina Faso	Sissili	H5	No	39, 57, 83
Bruderheim		4 March 1960	Canada	Alberta	L6	No	18
Soheria		8 January 1960	India	Bihar	OC	No	
St.-Chinian		25 December 1959	France	Languedoc-Roussillon	L6	No	19
Yardymly	Yardymly	24 November 1959	Azerbaijan	Yardimli District	IAB complex iron	No	16
Kandahar (Afghanistan)		November 1959	Afghanistan	Kandahar	L6	No	19
Hamlet		13 October 1959	United States	Indiana	LL4	No	17
Akwanga		2 July 1959	Nigeria	Plateau State	H5	No	30
Pribram	Příbram	7 April 1959	Czech Republic	Central Bohemian Region	H5	Yes	15

=== Falls before automated monitoring (1794–1959) ===
This table lists all meteorites with observed falls since 1794 and before 1959. In April 1794 the German natural scientists Ernst Chladni published his book On the Origin of the Pallas Iron and Other Similar Iron Masses, and on Some Associated Natural Phenomena. This publication was a turning point in the understanding of meteorites because it argued, against the fashionable skepticism of the time, that the reported falls of stones and irons were real and that meteorites have their origin in cosmic space, linking them to bright fireballs. It was a groundbreaking work for the further development of scientific views since the late 18th century.

Meteorite name	Meteorite link	Fall observation date	Country	State, province, or region	Classification	Meteoritical Bulletin(s)
Okabe		26 November 1958	Japan	Kanto	H5	14
Ramsdorf		26 July 1958	Germany	North Rhine-Westphalia	L6	13
Al Rais		10 December 1957	Saudi Arabia	Medina	CR2	27
Raco		17 November 1957	Argentina	Tucumán	H5	21
Ufana		5 August 1957	Tanzania	Manyara	EL6	10
Essebi		28 July 1957	Congo – Dem. Rep.	Orientale	C2 (ungrouped)	27
Ibitira		30 June 1957	Brazil	Minas Gerais	Eucrite-mmict	06
Distrito Quebracho		13 March 1957	Argentina	Entre Ríos	H4	24
San Pedro de Quiles		October 1956	Chile	Coquimbo	L6	
Breitscheid		11 August 1956	Germany	Hessen	H5	02
Nadiabondi		27 July 1956	Burkina Faso	Gourma	H5	07
Hotse		26 June 1956	China	Shandong	L6	
Centerville		29 February 1956	United States	South Dakota	H5	26
Sinnai		19 February 1956	Italy	Sardinia	H6	10
Idutywa		1 February 1956	South Africa	Eastern Cape	H5	
Paranaiba		1956	Brazil	Mato Grosso do Sul	L6	
Zvonkov		2 September 1955	Ukraine	Kyiv	H6	06
Karloowala		21 July 1955	Pakistan	Punjab	L6	
Messina		16 July 1955	Italy	Sicilia	L5	
Lahrauli		24 March 1955	India	Uttar Pradesh	Ureilite	
Sylacauga	Sylacauga	30 November 1954	United States	Alabama	H4	
Ishinga		8 October 1954	Tanzania	Mbeya	H	10
Arbol Solo	Arbol Solo	11 September 1954	Argentina	San Luis	H5	
Hökmark		9 June 1954	Sweden	Västerbotten County	L4	20
Yangchiang		12 April 1954	China	Guangdong	H5	
Nikolskoe		6 March 1954	Russia	Moscow Oblast	L4	06
Medanitos		14 July 1953	Argentina	Catamarca	Eucrite (cumulate)	10
Molteno		April 1953 or May	South Africa	Eastern Cape	Howardite	
Peckelsheim		3 March 1953	Germany	North Rhine-Westphalia	Diogenite	
Zavetnoe		4 December 1952	Russia	Rostov Oblast	L6	06
Galim (a)		13 November 1952	Cameroon	Adamawa	LL6	
Abee	Abee	10 June 1952	Canada	Alberta	EH4	
Min-Fan-Zhun		1 April 1952	China	Jiangsu	LL6	10
Avanhandava	Avanhandava	1952	Brazil	São Paulo	H4	
Galim (b)		1952	Cameroon	Adamawa	EH3/4	
Kalaba		31 October 1951	Congo – Dem. Rep. (former Zaïre)	Katanga (former Shaba)	H4	
Manych		20 October 1951	Russia	Kalmykia	LL3	
Yambo		20 October 1951	Congo – Dem. Rep. (former Zaire)	Équateur	H5	
Elenovka		17 October 1951	Ukraine	Donetsk	L5	06
Aarhus	Aarhus	2 October 1951	Denmark	Central	H6	
Lusaka		April 1951 (before)	Congo – Dem. Rep.	Katanga	Stone	
Dubrovnik		20 February 1951	Croatia	—	L3	18
St. Louis		10 December 1950	United States	Missouri	H4	
Vengerovo		11 October 1950	Russia	Novosibirsk Oblast	H5	
Monze		5 October 1950	Zambia	Southern	L6	
Murray	Murray	20 September 1950	United States	Kentucky	CM2	
Monte das Fortes		23 August 1950	Portugal	Beja	L5	
Patrimonio		6 August 1950	Brazil	Minas Gerais	L6	
Geidam		6 July 1950	Nigeria	Yobe	H5	
Thal		June 1950	Pakistan	Khyber Pakhtunkhwa	H6	
Madhipura		23 May 1950	India	Bihar	L	
Tromøy		9 April 1950	Norway	Agder	H	
Arroyo Aguiar	Arroyo Aguiar	1950 Summer	Argentina	Santa Fe	H5	
Garland		1950 Summer	United States	Utah	Diogenite	
Alberta		13 November 1949	Congo – Dem. Rep.	Orientale	L	
Adzhi-Bogdo (stone)	Adzhi-Bogdo	30 October 1949	Mongolia	Govi-Altai	LL3-6	
Akaba		21 September 1949	Jordan	Aqaba Governorate	L6	
Beddgelert	Beddgelert	21 September 1949	United Kingdom	Wales	H5	
Karewar		19 September 1949	Nigeria	Katsina	L6	
Kunashak		11 June 1949	Russia	Chelyabinsk Oblast	L6	06
Palolo Valley		24 April 1949	United States	Hawaii	H5	
Vetluga		27 February 1949	Russia	Nizhny Novgorod Oblast	Eucrite-mmict	
Rupota		7 February 1949	Tanzania	Lindi	L4	
Mezel		25 January 1949	France	Auvergne-Rhône-Alpes	L6	
Benton	Benton	16 January 1949	Canada	New Brunswick	LL6	
Guidder		7 January 1949	Cameroon	Nord	LL4	
Ibrisim		1949 Summer	Turkey	Niğde	OC	
Mardan		8 May 1948	Pakistan	Khyber Pakhtunkhwa	H5	
Uzcudun		16 April 1948	Argentina	Chubut	L	
Norton County	Norton County	18 February 1948	United States	Kansas	Aubrite	
Reliegos		28 December 1947	Spain	Castile and León	L5	
Seldebourak		26 February 1947	Algeria	Tamanrasset	H5	
Sikhote-Alin	Sikhote-Alin	12 February 1947	Russia	Primorsky Krai	IIAB iron	
Långhalsen		6 February 1947	Sweden	Södermanland	L6	20
Git-Git		9 January 1947	Nigeria	Plateau	L6	
Eagle		1946 or 1947	United States	Nebraska	EL6	
Peña Blanca Spring		2 August 1946	United States	Texas	Aubrite	
Walters		28 July 1946	United States	Oklahoma	L6	
Krasnyi Klyuch		4 May 1946	Russia	Bashkortostan	H5	
Krymka		21 January 1946	Ukraine	Mykolaiv	LL3	
Bursa		1946	Turkey	Bursa	L6	
Atoka	Atoka	17 September 1945	United States	Oklahoma	L6	
Soroti		17 September 1945	Uganda	Eastern	Iron (ungrouped)	
Fuhe		June 1945	China	Hubei	L5	
Meru		2 February 1945	Kenya	Meru	LL6	
Valdavur		30 October 1944	India	Tamil Nadu	H6	
Torrington		23 September 1944	United States	Wyoming	H6	
Mtola		17 June 1944	Malawi	Northern	Stone-uncl	
Mike		3 May 1944	Hungary	Somogy	L6	
Tulung Dzong		26 March 1944	Tibet	Tibet	Stone-uncl	
Hallingeberg		1 February 1944	Sweden	Kalmar	L3	
Leedey		25 November 1943	United States	Oklahoma	L6	
Duwun		23 November 1943	South Korea	Jeonnam-Gwangju	L6	
Benoni		25 July 1943	South Africa	Gauteng	H6	
Maziba		24 September 1942	Uganda	Western Region	L6	
Kamalpur		18 August 1942	India	Uttar Pradesh	L6	
Forest Vale		7 August 1942	Australia	New South Wales	H4	
Ankober	Ankober	7 July 1942	Ethiopia	Shewa	H4	05
Kapoeta		22 April 1942	South Sudan	—	Howardite	
Parsa		14 April 1942	India	Bihar	EH3	
Pollen		6 April 1942	Norway	Nordland	CM2	
Bununu		April 1942	Nigeria	Bauchi	Howardite	05
Phuoc-Binh		18 July 1941	Vietnam	Đà Nẵng	L5	
Black Moshannan Park		10 July 1941	United States	Pennsylvania	L5	
Mafra		1941	Brazil	Santa Catarina	L3	
Maridi		1941 (before)	South Sudan	Western Equatoria	H6	
Ramnagar		15 December 1940	India	Uttar Pradesh	L6	
Semarkona		26 October 1940	India	Madhya Pradesh	LL3	
Erakot		22 June 1940	India	Madhya Pradesh	CM2	
Bhola		27 March 1940	Bangladesh	Barisal	LL3	
Kediri		1940	Indonesia	Jawa Timur	L4	
Nyaung		24 December 1939	Burma	Magwe	IIIAB iron	
Glanggang		26 September 1939	Indonesia	Jawa Barat	H5	
Selakopi		26 September 1939	Indonesia	Jawa Barat	H5	
Santa Cruz		3 September 1939	Mexico	Tamaulipas	CM2	
Andura	Andura	9 August 1939	India	Maharashtra	H6	
Dresden (Ontario)		11 July 1939	Canada	Ontario	H6	
Washougal		2 July 1939	United States	Washington	Howardite	
Chervony Kut		23 June 1939	Ukraine	Sumy	Eucrite-mmict	
Kendleton		2 May 1939	United States	Texas	L4	
Ekeby		5 April 1939	Sweden	Skåne	H4	
Ivuna		16 December 1938	Tanzania	Songwe	CI1	
Zhovtnevyi		10 October 1938	Ukraine	Donetsk	H6	
Benld		29 September 1938	United States	Illinois	H6	
Chicora		24 June 1938	United States	Pennsylvania	LL6	
Pantar		16 June 1938	Philippines	Central Mindanao	H5	
Kukschin		11 June 1938	Ukraine	Chernihiv	L6	
Pavlodar (Stone)		23 May 1938	Kazakhstan	Pavlodar	H5	
Kasamatsu		31 March 1938	Japan	Chūbu	H	
Aztec		1 February 1938	United States	New Mexico	L6	
Lavrentievka		11 January 1938	Russia	Orenburg Oblast	L6	
Bloomington		1938 Summer	United States	Illinois	LL6	
Rangala		29 December 1937	India	Rajasthan	L6	
Belville		December 1937	Argentina	Córdoba	OC	
Mabwe-Khoywa		17 September 1937	Burma	Kayah State	L5	
Kainsaz	Kainsaz	13 September 1937	Russia	Tatarstan	CO3.2	
Putinga		16 August 1937	Brazil	Rio Grande do Sul	L6	
Tauti		July 1937 or August	Romania	Arad	L6	
Kaptal-Aryk		12 May 1937	Kazakhstan	Jambyl Region	L6	
Macibini		23 September 1936	South Africa	KwaZulu-Natal	Eucrite-pmict	
Crescent		17 August 1936	United States	Oklahoma	CM2	
Nassirah		15 July 1936	New Caledonia	—	H4	
Ichkala		29 May 1936	Russia	Tomsk Oblast	H6	
Yurtuk		2 April 1936	Ukraine	Zaporizhia	Howardite	
Patwar		29 July 1935	Bangladesh	Chittagong	Mesosiderite	
Nikolaevka		11 July 1935	Kazakhstan	Pavlodar	H4	
Madiun		20 June 1935	Indonesia	Jawa Timur	L6	
Perpeti		14 May 1935	Bangladesh	Chittagong	L6	
Sungach		10 April 1935	Russia	Primorskiy Krai	H5	
Łowicz	Łowicz	12 March 1935	Poland	Łódź	Mesosiderite	
Fayetteville		26 December 1934	United States	Arkansas	H4	
Farmville		4 December 1934	United States	North Carolina	H4	
Hainaut		26 November 1934	France	Hauts-de-France	H3	
Rio Negro		21 September 1934	Brazil	Parana	L4	
Bahjoi		23 July 1934	India	Uttar Pradesh	IAB complex iron	
Sazovice		28 June 1934	Czech Republic	Zlín	L5	
Tirupati		20 March 1934	India	Andhra Pradesh	H6	
Mangwendi		7 March 1934	Zimbabwe	Mashonaland East	LL6	
Rumuruti		28 January 1934	Kenya	Laikipia County	R3	
Capilla del Monte		1934	Argentina	Córdoba	H6	
Pervomaisky		26 December 1933	Russia	Vladimir Oblast	L6	
Chajari		29 November 1933	Argentina	Entre Ríos	L5	21
Malaga		November 1933	United States	New Mexico	OC	
Malvern		November 1933	South Africa	Orange Free State	Eucrite-pmict	
Po-wang Chen		23 October 1933	China	Anhui	LL	
Pesyanoe		2 October 1933	Russia	Kurgan Oblast	Aubrite	
Noyan-Bogdo		25 September 1933	Mongolia	Ömnögovi	L6	
Repeev Khutor		8 August 1933	Russia	Astrakhan Oblast	IIF iron	
Sioux County		8 August 1933	United States	Nebraska	Eucrite-mmict	
Athens		11 July 1933	United States	Alabama	LL6	
Cherokee Springs		1 July 1933	United States	South Carolina	LL6	
Banten		24 May 1933	Indonesia	Jawa Barat	CM2	
Brient		19 April 1933	Russia	Orenburg Oblast	Eucrite-pmict	
Pasamonte		24 March 1933	United States	New Mexico	Eucrite-pmict	
Zemaitkiemis	Žemaitkiemis	2 February 1933	Lithuania	—	L6	
Dyarrl Island		31 January 1933	Papua New Guinea	New Ireland	Mesosiderite	
Phum Sambo		9 January 1933	Cambodia	Kampong Cham	H4	
Witsand Farm		1 December 1932	Namibia	Karas	LL4	
Prambachkirchen		5 November 1932	Austria	Upper Austria	L6	
Gualeguaychú		October 1932	Argentina	Entre Ríos	H6	
Douar Mghila		20 August 1932	Morocco	Meknès-Tafilalet	LL6	
Archie	Archie	10 August 1932	United States	Missouri	H6	
Khanpur		8 July 1932	India	Uttar Pradesh	LL4	
Kuznetzovo		26 May 1932	Russia	Novosibirsk Oblast	L6	
Khor Temiki		8 April 1932	Sudan	Kassala	Aubrite	
Yukan		27 August 1931	China	Jiangxi	LL6	
Ardón		9 July 1931	Spain	Castilla y Leon	L6	103
Tatahouine		27 June 1931	Tunisia	Tataouine	Diogenite	
Wuzhi		25 June 1931	China	Henan	Stone-uncl	
Malotas		22 June 1931	Argentina	Santiago del Estero	H5	
Konovo		26 May 1931	Bulgaria	Sliven	LL5	
Pontlyfni		14 April 1931	United Kingdom	Wales	Winonaite	
Karoonda	Karoonda	25 November 1930	Australia	South Australia	CK4	
Moorleah		October 1930	Australia	Tasmania	L6	
Oldenburg (1930)	Oldenburg	10 September 1930	Germany	Niedersachsen	L6	
Plantersville		4 September 1930	United States	Texas	H6	
Aguada		September 1930	Argentina	Córdoba	L6	
Malampaka		September 1930 (?)	Tanzania	Simiyu Region	H	
Miller (Arkansas)		13 July 1930	United States	Arkansas	H5	
Lillaverke		11 May 1930	Sweden	Kalmar	H5	20
Boriskino		20 April 1930	Russia	Orenburg Oblast	CM2	
Gyokukei		17 March 1930	South Korea	Jeonnam-Gwangju	OC	12
Paragould	Paragould	17 February 1930	United States	Arkansas	LL4	
Beardsley	Beardsley	15 October 1929	United States	Kansas	H5	
Bald Mountain		9 July 1929	United States	North Carolina	L4	
Rewari		July 1929 (approx.)	India	Haryana	L6	
Khmelevka		1 March 1929	Russia	Omsk Oblast	L5	
Olmedilla de Alarcón		26 February 1929	Spain	Castilla–La Mancha	H5	
Padvarninkai	Padvarninkai	9 February 1929	Lithuania	—	Eucrite-mmict	
Tauk		1929 Spring	Iraq	Kirkuk Governorate	L6	
Isthilart		12 November 1928	Argentina	Entre Ríos	H5	
Oterøy		15 October 1928	Norway	Telemark	L6	
Naoki		29 September 1928	India	Maharashtra	H6	
Utzenstorf		16 August 1928	Switzerland	Bern	H5	
Yoshiki		25 June 1928	Japan	Chūgoku	Stone-uncl	
Narellan		8 April 1928	Australia	New South Wales	L6	
Oesede		30 December 1927	Germany	Niedersachsen	H5	
Tilden	Tilden	13 July 1927	United States	Illinois	L6	
Trysil		21 June 1927	Norway	Innlandet	L/LL6	
Mamra Springs		5 May 1927	Kazakhstan	Kyzylorda Region	L6	
Sopot		27 April 1927	Romania	Dolj	H5	
Udei Station		1927 Spring	Nigeria	Benue State	IAB complex iron	
Ulmiz		25 December 1926	Switzerland	Fribourg	H3-6	
Ojuelos Altos		10 December 1926	Spain	Andalucia	L6	
Lua		26 June 1926	India	Rajasthan	L5	
Jajh deh Kot Lalu		2 May 1926	Pakistan	Sind	EL6	
Komagome		18 April 1926	Japan	Kantō	Iron	
Urasaki		16 April 1926	Japan	Chūgoku	Stone-uncl	
Palmyra		20 January 1926	United States	Missouri	L3	
Numakai		4 September 1925	Japan	Hokkaidō	H4	
Ellemeet		28 August 1925	Netherlands	Zeeland	Diogenite	
Lanzenkirchen		28 August 1925	Austria	Niederosterreich	L4	
Villarrica		20 July 1925	Paraguay	Guaira	Stone-uncl	
Renca		20 June 1925	Argentina	San Luis	L5	
Chaves		3 May 1925	Portugal	Vila Real	Howardite	
Queen's Mercy		30 April 1925	South Africa	Eastern Cape	H6	
Maria Linden		15 April 1925	South Africa	Eastern Cape	L4	
Aïr		1925	Niger	Agadez	L6	
Santa Isabel		18 November 1924	Argentina	Santa Fe	L6	
Fenghsien-Ku		5 October 1924	China	Jiangsu	H5	
Unkoku		7 September 1924	South Korea	Jeonnam-Gwangju	OC	
Muraid		7 August 1924	Bangladesh	Dhaka	L6	
Forksville		16 July 1924	United States	Virginia	L6	
Johnstown	Johnstown	6 July 1924	United States	Colorado	Diogenite	
Béréba		27 June 1924	Burkina Faso	Houet	Eucrite-mmict	
Olivenza		19 June 1924	Spain	Extremadura	LL4	
Success		18 April 1924	United States	Arkansas	L6	05
La Colina		19 March 1924	Argentina	Buenos Aires	H5	
Lake Labyrinth		5 February 1924	Australia	South Australia	LL6	
Nakhon Pathom		21 December 1923	Thailand	Nakhon Pathom	L6	
Serra de Magé		1 October 1923	Brazil	Pernambuco	Eucrite (cumulate)	
Holetta		14 April 1923	Ethiopia	Shewa	Stone-uncl	
Birni N'konni		April 1923 or May	Niger	Tahoua	H4	
Ashdon		9 March 1923	United Kingdom	England	L6	
Montferré		1923 Summer	France	Languedoc-Roussillon	H5	
Tjerebon		10 July 1922	Indonesia	Jawa Barat	L5	
Nagai		30 May 1922	Japan	Tohoku	L6	
Hedeskoga		20 April 1922	Sweden	Skåne	H5	
Baldwyn		2 February 1922	United States	Mississippi	L6	
Florence		21 January 1922	United States	Texas	H3	
Patti		1922	Italy	Sicilia	Iron	
Beyrout		31 December 1921	Lebanon	Beirut	LL3	
Rose City		17 October 1921	United States	Michigan	H5	
Shikarpur		9 August 1921	India	Bihar	L6	
Tuan Tuc		30 June 1921	Vietnam	Cần Thơ	L6	
Samelia		20 May 1921	India	Rajasthan	IIIAB iron	
Pitts		20 April 1921	United States	Georgia	IAB complex iron	
Sharps		1 April 1921	United States	Virginia	H3	
Haripura		17 January 1921	India	Rajasthan	CM2	
Atarra		23 December 1920	India	Uttar Pradesh	L4	
Kushiike		16 September 1920	Japan	Tohoku	H5	
Merua		30 August 1920	India	Uttar Pradesh	H5	
Simmern		1 July 1920	Germany	Rheinland-Pfalz	H5	
Aguila Blanca		15 January 1920	Argentina	Córdoba	L	
Bur-Gheluai		16 October 1919	Somalia	Mudug	H5	
Rembang		30 August 1919	Indonesia	Jawa Tengah	IVA iron	
St. Mary's County		20 June 1919	United States	Maryland	LL3	
Cacak		6 June 1919	Serbia	—	OC	
Adhi Kot	Adhi Kot	1 May 1919	Pakistan	Punjab	EH4	
Cumberland Falls		9 April 1919	United States	Kentucky	Aubrite	
Raoyang		1919	China	Hebei	L6	
Norfork		October 1918	United States	Arkansas	IIIAB iron	
Saratov		6 September 1918	Russia	Saratov Oblast	L4	
Richardton	Richardton	30 June 1918	United States	North Dakota	H5	
Witklip Farm		26 May 1918	South Africa	Mpumalanga	H5	
Glasatovo		27 February 1918	Russia	Tver Oblast	H4	
Tané		25 January 1918	Japan	Kinki	L5	
Strathmore	Strathmore	3 December 1917	United Kingdom	Scotland	L6	
Independence		1917 Summer	United States	Missouri	L6	
Silistra		19 July 1917	Bulgaria	Silistra	Achondrite (ungrouped)	
Nan Yang Pao		11 July 1917	China	Gansu	L6	
Colby (Wisconsin)		4 July 1917	United States	Wisconsin	L6	
Cranganore		3 July 1917	India	Kerala	L6	
Troup		26 April 1917	United States	Texas	L6	
Ranchapur		20 February 1917	India	Bihar	H4	
Garhi Yasin		January 1917	Pakistan	Sind	IIE iron	
Sediköy		1917	Turkey	İzmir Province	L6	
Rampurhat		21 November 1916	India	West Bengal	LL	
Boguslavka		18 October 1916	Russia	Primorsky Krai	IIAB iron	
Sinai		14 July 1916 or 17	Egypt	Ismailia	L6	
Sultanpur		10 July 1916	India	Uttar Pradesh	L6	
Calivo		26 May 1916	Philippines	Western Visayas	Stone-uncl	
Tomita		13 April 1916	Japan	Chūgoku	L	
Ekh Khera		5 April 1916	India	Uttar Pradesh	H6	
Treysa	Treysa	3 April 1916	Germany	Hessen	IIIAB iron	
Renqiu		23 March 1916	China	Hebei	L6	
Baxter		18 January 1916	United States	Missouri	L6	
Meester-Cornelis		2 June 1915	Indonesia	Jakarta	H5	
Visuni		19 January 1915	Pakistan	Sind	H6	
Appley Bridge	Appley Bridge	13 October 1914	United Kingdom	England	LL6	
Nyirábrany		17 July 1914	Hungary	Hajdú-Bihar	LL4	
Saint-Sauveur		10 July 1914	France	Midi-Pyrénées	EH5	
Palinshih		July 1914	China	Inner Mongolia	Iron	12
Kisvarsány		24 May 1914	Hungary	Szabolcs-Szatmár-Bereg	L6	
Ryechki		9 April 1914	Ukraine	Sumy	L5	
Kuttippuram		6 April 1914	India	Kerala	L6	
Moore County		21 April 1913	United States	North Carolina	Eucrite (cumulate)	
Sakauchi		13 April 1913	Japan	Chūbu	Iron	
Kamiomi		March 1913 or April (?)	Japan	Kantō	H5	
Banswal		12 January 1913	India	Uttar Pradesh	L5	
N'Kandhla		1 August 1912	South Africa	KwaZulu/Natal	IID iron	
Holbrook	Holbrook	19 July 1912	United States	Arizona	L6	
Leeuwfontein		21 June 1912	South Africa	Gauteng	L6	
Shupiyan		April 1912	India	Jammu & Kashmir	H6	
Demina		6 September 1911	Russia	Altai Krai	L6	
Nakhla	Nakhla	28 June 1911	Egypt	Al Buhayrah	Martian (nakhlite)	
Kilbourn		16 June 1911	United States	Wisconsin	H5	
Tonk	Tonk	22 January 1911	India	Rajasthan	CI1	
Erevan		1911 or 1912	Armenia	—	Howardite	
Lakangaon		24 November 1910	India	Madhya Pradesh	Eucrite-mmict	
Palahatchie		17 October 1910	United States	Mississippi	OC	
Khohar		19 September 1910	India	Madhya Pradesh	L3	
Baroti		15 September 1910	India	Himachal Pradesh	L6	
Grzempach		3 September 1910	Poland	Greater Poland Voivodeship	H5	
St. Michel		12 July 1910	Finland	South Savo	L6	
Paitan		May 1910	Philippines	Ilocos	H6	
Vigarano		22 January 1910	Italy	Emilia-Romagna	CV3	
Mirzapur		7 January 1910	India	Uttar Pradesh	L5	
Hashima		1910 (approx.)	Japan	Chūbu	H4	
Hedjaz		1910 Spring	Saudi Arabia	Tabuk	L3	
Gifu		24 July 1909	Japan	Chūbu	L6	
Blanket		30 May 1909	United States	Texas	L6	
Sete Lagoas		15 December 1908	Brazil	Minas Gerais	H4	
Kangean		27 November 1908	Indonesia	Jawa Timur	H5	
Mokoia		26 November 1908	New Zealand	Taranaki	CV3	
Kagarlyk		30 June 1908	Ukraine	Kyiv	L6	
Novy-Projekt		25 April 1908	Lithuania	—	OC	
Avce		31 March 1908	Slovenia	Littoral	IIAB iron	
Bali		22 November 1907 (or 23)	Central African Republic	Nana-Mambéré	CV3	
Chainpur		9 May 1907	India	Uttar Pradesh	LL3	
Domanitch		1 February 1907	Turkey	Bursa	L5	
Leighton		12 January 1907	United States	Alabama	H5	
Vishnupur		15 December 1906	India	West Bengal	LL4	
Kirbyville		12 November 1906	United States	Texas	Eucrite-mmict	
Diep River		4 November 1906	South Africa	Western Cape	L6	
Kijima (1906)		15 June 1906	Japan	Chūbu	Stone-uncl	
Blackwell		May 1906	United States	Oklahoma	L5	
Kulp		29 March 1906	Armenia	—	H6	
Krutikha		1906 or 1907	Russia	Novosibirsk Oblast	OC	
Bholghati		29 October 1905	India	Orissa	Howardite	
Modoc (1905)		2 September 1905	United States	Kansas	L6	
Minnichhof		27 May 1905	Austria	Burgenland	OC	
Karkh		27 April 1905	Pakistan	Baluchistan	L6	
Tomakovka		17 January 1905	Ukraine	Dnipropetrovsk	LL6	
Shelburne		13 August 1904	Canada	Ontario	L5	
Barnaul		22 May 1904	Russia	Altai Krai	H5	
Gumoschnik		28 April 1904	Bulgaria	Lovech	H5	
Okano		7 April 1904	Japan	Kinki	IIAB iron	
Dokachi		22 October 1903	Bangladesh	Dhaka	H5	
Valdinizza		12 July 1903	Italy	Lombardy	L6	
Rich Mountain		30 June 1903	United States	North Carolina	L6	
Uberaba		29 June 1903	Brazil	Minas Gerais	H5	
Jackalsfontein		22 April 1903	South Africa	Western Cape	L6	
Tyumen		20 April 1903 or 22	Russia	Tyumen Oblast	Iron	13
St. Mark's		3 January 1903	South Africa	Eastern Cape	EH5	
Menziswyl		July 1903	Switzerland	Fribourg	L5	
Bath Furnace		15 November 1902	United States	Kentucky	L6	
Kamsagar		12 November 1902	India	Karnataka	L6	
Crumlin		13 September 1902	United Kingdom	Northern Ireland	L5	
Caratash		22 August 1902	Turkey	İzmir Province	LL6	
Mount Browne		17 July 1902	Australia	New South Wales	H6	
Achiras		1902	Argentina	Córdoba	L6	
Marjalahti		June 1902	Russia	Republic of Karelia	Pallasite	
Koshigaya		8 March 1902	Japan	Kanto	L4	112
Chervettaz		30 November 1901	Switzerland	Vaud	L5	
Hvittis		21 October 1901	Finland	Satakunta	EL6	
Sindhri		10 June 1901	Pakistan	Sind	H5	
Phillips County (Stone)		9 May 1901	United States	Kansas	L6	
Jemlapur		February 1901	India	—	L6	
Leonovka		23 August 1900	Ukraine	Chernihiv	L6	
Ofehértó		25 July 1900	Hungary	Szabolcs-Szatmár-Bereg	L6	
Alexandrovsky		8 July 1900	Ukraine	Chernihiv	H4	
N'Goureyma		15 June 1900	Mali	Mopti	Iron (ungrouped)	
Forsbach		12 June 1900	Germany	North Rhine-Westphalia	H6	
Felix		15 May 1900	United States	Alabama	CO3.3	
Emmaville		1900	Australia	New South Wales	Eucrite-mmict	
Ovambo		1900 (approx.)	Namibia	Owambo	L6	
Peramiho		24 October 1899	Tanzania	Ruvuma	Eucrite-mmict	
Donga Kohrod		23 September 1899	India	Madhya Pradesh	H6	
Allegan	Allegan	10 July 1899	United States	Michigan	H5	
Bjurböle		12 March 1899	Finland	Uusimaa	L/LL4	
Zomba		25 January 1899	Malawi	Southern	L6	
Magnesia		1899	Turkey	Aydın	IAB complex iron	
Rancho de la Presa		1899	Mexico	Michoacan	H5	
Mariaville		16 October 1898	United States	Nebraska	Iron	
Andover		5 August 1898	United States	Maine	L6	
Quesa		1 August 1898	Spain	Valencian Community	IAB complex iron	
Zaisho	Zaisho	1 February 1898	Japan	Shikoku	Pallasite	
Mjelleim		24 January 1898	Norway	Vestland	H	
Delhi		18 October 1897	India	Delhi	L5	
Gambat		15 September 1897	Pakistan	Sind	L6	
Higashi-koen		11 August 1897	Japan	Kyūshū	H5	
Nio		8 August 1897	Japan	Chūgoku	H3	
Zavid		1 August 1897	Bosnia and Herzegovina	—	L6	
Lancon		20 June 1897	France	Provence-Alpes-Côte d'Azur	H6	
Meuselbach		19 May 1897	Germany	Thuringen	L6	
Kangra Valley		1897 (approx.)	India	Himachal Pradesh	H5	
Lesves		13 April 1896	Belgium	Namur	L6	
Ottawa		9 April 1896	United States	Kansas	LL6	
Atemajac		26 February 1896	Mexico	Jalisco	L6	
Madrid		10 February 1896	Spain	Madrid	L6	
Ambapur Nagla	Ambapur Nagla	27 May 1895	India	Uttar Pradesh	H5	
Nagy-Borové		9 May 1895	Slovakia	Žilina Region	L5	
Bishunpur		26 April 1895	India	Uttar Pradesh	LL3	
Rockhampton		1895 Spring	Australia	Queensland	Stone-uncl	
Savtschenskoje		27 July 1894	Ukraine	Odesa	LL4	
Bori		9 May 1894	India	Madhya Pradesh	L6	
Los Martinez		May 1894	Spain	Valencian Community	L6	
Fisher		9 April 1894	United States	Minnesota	L6	
Zabrodje	Zabrodje	22 September 1893	Belarus	Vitebsk	L6	
Beaver Creek		26 May 1893	Canada	British Columbia	H5	
Bherai		28 April 1893	India	Gujarat	L6	
Pricetown		13 February 1893	United States	Ohio	L6	
Bath		29 August 1892	United States	South Dakota	H4	
Guareña		20 July 1892	Spain	Extremadura	H6	
Cross Roads		24 May 1892	United States	North Carolina	H5	
Bansur		1892	India	Rajasthan	L6	
Guča	Guča	28 September 1891	Serbia	—	Stone-uncl	
Indarch		7 April 1891	Azerbaijan	Shusha District	EH4	
St. Germain-du-Pinel		4 July 1890	France	Brittany	H6	
Farmington		25 June 1890	United States	Kansas	L5	
Nawapali		6 June 1890	India	Orissa	CM2	
Kakangari		4 June 1890	India	Tamil Nadu	K3	
Forest City		2 May 1890	United States	Iowa	H5	
Misshof		10 April 1890	Latvia	—	H5	
Collescipoli		3 February 1890	Italy	Umbria	H5	
Hassi-Jekna		1890 (before)	Algeria	Adrar	IAB complex iron	
Jianshi		1890 (approx.)	China	Hubei	IIIAB iron	
Jelica		1 December 1889	Serbia	—	LL6	
Ferguson		18 July 1889	United States	North Carolina	OC	
Ergheo		July 1889	Somalia	Shabeellaha Hoose	L5	
Mighei		18 June 1889	Ukraine	Mykolaiv	CM2	
Lundsgård		3 April 1889	Sweden	Skåne County	L6	
Phu Hong		22 September 1887	Vietnam	Lâm Đồng	H4	
Ochansk		30 August 1887	Russia	Perm Krai	H4	
Lalitpur		7 April 1887	India	Uttar Pradesh	L6	
De Cewsville		21 January 1887	Canada	Ontario	H6	
Bielokrynitschie		1 January 1887	Ukraine	Khmelnytsky	H4	
Kyushu		26 October 1886	Japan	Kyūshū	L6	
Novo-Urei		4 September 1886	Russia	Mordovia	Ureilite	
Bradford Woods		September 1886	United States	Pennsylvania	L	
Barntrup		28 May 1886	Germany	North Rhine-Westphalia	LL4	
Assisi	Assisi	24 May 1886	Italy	Umbria	H5	
Cabin Creek		27 March 1886	United States	Arkansas	IIIAB iron	
Nammianthal		27 January 1886	India	Tamil Nadu	H5	
Mazapil		27 November 1885	Mexico	Zacatecas	IAB complex iron	
Chandpur		6 April 1885	India	Uttar Pradesh	L6	
Tysnes Island		20 May 1884	Norway	Vestland	H4	
Djati-Pengilon		19 March 1884	Indonesia	Jawa Timur	H6	
Pirthalla		9 February 1884	India	Haryana	H6	
Ngawi		3 October 1883	Indonesia	Jawa Timur	LL3	
Alfianello		16 February 1883	Italy	Lombardy	L6	
St. Caprais-de-Quinsac		28 January 1883	France	Aquitaine	L6	
Pirgunje		29 August 1882	Bangladesh	Rangpur Division	L6	
Pavlovka	Pavlovka	2 August 1882	Russia	Saratov Oblast	Howardite	
Fukutomi		19 March 1882	Japan	Saga Prefecture	L5	
Mocs		3 February 1882	Romania	Cluj	L5	
Grossliebenthal		19 November 1881	Ukraine	Odesa	L6	
Pacula		18 June 1881	Mexico	Hidalgo	L6	
Middlesbrough	Middlesbrough	14 March 1881	United Kingdom	England	L6	
Piquetberg		1881	South Africa	Western Cape	H	
Wittekrantz		9 December 1880	South Africa	Western Cape	L5	
Andhara		2 December 1880	India	Bihar	Stone-uncl	
Chetrinahatti		6 September 1880	India	Karnataka	Stone-uncl	
Ratyn		24 August 1880	Poland	Greater Poland Voivodeship	Stone-uncl	
Veramin		18 April 1880	Iran	Tehran	Mesosiderite	
Takenouchi		18 February 1880	Japan	Kinki	H5	
Aachen		1880	Germany	North Rhine-Westphalia	L5	
Kalumbi		4 November 1879	India	Maharashtra	L6	
Tomatlan		17 September 1879	Mexico	Jalisco	H6	
Nogoya		30 June 1879	Argentina	Entre Ríos	CM2	
Gnadenfrei		17 May 1879	Poland	Lower Silesian Voivodeship	H5	
Estherville		10 May 1879	United States	Iowa	Mesosiderite	
Itapicuru-Mirim		March 1879	Brazil	Maranhão	H5	
La Bécasse		31 January 1879	France	Centre-Val de Loire	L6	
Tenham	Tenham	1879 Spring	Australia	Queensland	L6	
Rakovka		20 November 1878	Russia	Oryol Oblast	L6	
Dandapur		5 September 1878	India	Uttar Pradesh	L6	
Mern		29 August 1878	Denmark	Zealand	L6	
Haraiya		August 1878 or September	India	Uttar Pradesh	Eucrite-mmict	
Tieschitz		15 July 1878	Czech Republic	Olomouc Region	H3	
La Charca		11 June 1878	Mexico	Guanajuato	OC	
Bhagur		27 November 1877	India	Maharashtra	L6	
Cronstad		19 November 1877	South Africa	Free State	H5	
Soko-Banja		13 October 1877	Serbia	—	LL4	
Jodzie		17 June 1877	Lithuania	—	Howardite	
Hungen		17 May 1877	Germany	Hessen	H6	
Cynthiana		23 January 1877	United States	Kentucky	L/LL4	
Warrenton		3 January 1877	United States	Missouri	CO3.7	
Rochester		21 December 1876	United States	Indiana	H6	
Ställdalen		28 June 1876	Sweden	Örebro	H5	
Vavilovka		19 June 1876	Ukraine	Kherson	LL6	
Rowton		20 April 1876	United Kingdom	England	IIIAB iron	
Judesegeri		16 February 1876	India	Karnataka	H6	
Mornans		September 1875	France	Auvergne-Rhône-Alpes	H5	
Feid Chair		16 August 1875	Algeria	El Taref	H4	
Nagaria		24 April 1875	India	Uttar Pradesh	Eucrite (cumulate)	
Zsadany		31 March 1875	Hungary	Békés	H5	
Sitathali		4 March 1875	India	Madhya Pradesh	H5	
Homestead	Homestead	12 February 1875	United States	Iowa	L5	
Kerilis		26 November 1874	France	Brittany	H5	
Castalia		14 May 1874	United States	North Carolina	H5	
Sevrukovo		11 May 1874	Russia	Belgorod Oblast	L5	
Diepenveen		27 October 1873	Netherlands	Overijssel	CM2-an	104
Santa Barbara		26 September 1873	Brazil	Rio Grande do Sul	L4	
Khairpur		23 September 1873	Pakistan	Punjab	EL6	
Virba		1 June 1873	Bulgaria	Vidin Province	L6	
Jhung		June 1873	Pakistan	Punjab	L5	
Aleppo		1873	Syria	Aleppo Governorate	L6	
Orvinio		31 August 1872	Italy	Lazio	H6	
Lancé		23 July 1872	France	Centre-Val de Loire	CO3.5	
Tennasilm		28 June 1872	Estonia	—	L4	
Dyalpur		8 May 1872	India	Uttar Pradesh	Ureilite	
Bandong		10 December 1871	Indonesia	Jawa Barat	LL6	
Laborel		14 June 1871	France	Auvergne-Rhône-Alpes	H5	
Searsmont		21 May 1871	United States	Maine	H5	
Roda		1871 Spring	Spain	Aragon	Diogenite	
Cabezo de Mayo		18 August 1870	Spain	Murcia	L/LL6	
Ibbenbüren		17 June 1870	Germany	North Rhine-Westphalia	Diogenite	
Nedagolla		23 January 1870	India	Andhra Pradesh	Iron (ungrouped)	
Lumpkin		6 October 1869	United States	Georgia	L6	
Tjabe		19 September 1869	Indonesia	Jawa Tengah	H6	
Yorktown (New York)		September 1869	United States	New York	L5	
Kernouve		22 May 1869	France	Brittany	H6	
Krähenberg		5 May 1869	Germany	Rheinland-Pfalz	LL4	
Hessle		1 January 1869	Sweden	Uppsala	H5	
Angra dos Reis (stone)	Angra dos Reis	January 1869	Brazil	Rio de Janeiro	Angrite	
Moti-ka-nagla		22 December 1868	India	Rajasthan	H6	
Frankfort (stone)		5 December 1868	United States	Alabama	Howardite	
Danville		27 November 1868	United States	Alabama	L6	
Lodran		1 October 1868	Pakistan	Punjab	Lodranite	
Sauguis		7 September 1868	France	Aquitaine	L6	
Ornans	Ornans	11 July 1868	France	Franche-Comté	CO3.4	
Pnompehn		June 1868	Cambodia	Phnom Penh	L6	
Slavetic		22 May 1868	Croatia	—	H5	
Daniel's Kuil		20 March 1868	South Africa	Northern Cape	EL6	
Motta di Conti		29 February 1868	Italy	Piemonte	H4	
Pultusk	Pultusk	30 January 1868	Poland	Masovian Voivodeship	H5	
Tadjera		9 June 1867	Algeria	Sétif	L5	
Otomi		24 May 1867	Japan	Tohoku	H	
Khetri		19 January 1867	India	Rajasthan	H6	
Cangas de Onis		6 December 1866	Spain	Asturias	H5	
Jamkheir		5 October 1866	India	Maharashtra	H6	
Knyahinya		9 June 1866	Ukraine	Zakarpats'ka	L/LL5	
Sone		7 June 1866	Japan	Kinki	H5	
St. Mesmin		30 May 1866	France	Champagne-Ardenne	LL6	
Pokhra		27 May 1866	India	Uttar Pradesh	H5	
Udipi		April 1866	India	Karnataka	H5	
Muddoor		21 September 1865	India	Karnataka	L5	
Aumale		25 August 1865	Algeria	Bouïra	L6	
Shergotty	Shergotty	25 August 1865	India	Bihar	Martian (shergottite)	
Dundrum	Dundrum	12 August 1865	Ireland	County Tipperary, Munster	H5	
Gopalpur		23 May 1865	Bangladesh	Natore, Rajshahi	H6	
Vernon County		26 March 1865	United States	Wisconsin	H6	
Supuhee		19 January 1865	India	Uttar Pradesh	H6	
Dolgovoli		26 June 1864	Ukraine	Volyn Oblast	L6	
Orgueil	Orgueil	14 May 1864	France	Midi-Pyrénées	CI1	
Nerft		12 April 1864	Latvia	—	L6	
Manbhoom		22 December 1863	India	West Bengal	LL6	
Tourinnes-la-Grosse		7 December 1863	Belgium	Walloon Brabant	L6	
Shytal		11 August 1863	Bangladesh	Dhaka Division	L6	
Pillistfer		8 August 1863	Estonia	—	EL6	
Buschhof		2 June 1863	Latvia	—	L6	
Pulsora		16 March 1863	India	Madhya Pradesh	H5	
Sevilla		1 November 1862	Spain	Andalucia	LL4	
Menow		7 October 1862	Germany	Brandenburg	H4	
Grosnaja		28 June 1861	Russia	Chechnya	CV3	
Cañellas		14 May 1861	Spain	Catalonia	H4	
Butsura		12 May 1861	India	Bihar	H6	
Meerut		1861 (approx.)	India	Uttar Pradesh	H5	
Dhurmsala		14 July 1860	India	Himachal Pradesh	LL6	
Kusiali		16 June 1860	India	Uttar Pradesh	L6	
New Concord		1 May 1860	United States	Ohio	L6	
Kheragur		28 March 1860	India	Uttar Pradesh	L6	
Alessandria		2 February 1860	Italy	Piemonte	H5	
Bethlehem		11 August 1859	United States	New York	H6	
Pampanga		5 April 1859	Philippines	Central Luzon	L5	
Harrison County		28 March 1859	United States	Indiana	L6	
Molina		24 December 1858	Spain	Murcia	H5	
Ausson		9 December 1858	France	Midi-Pyrénées	L5	
Zmenj		August 1858	Belarus	Brest	Howardite	
Kakowa		19 May 1858	Romania	Caraș-Severin	L6	
Quenggouk		27 December 1857	Burma	Ayeyarwady (a.k.a. Irrawaddy)	H4	
Ohaba		11 October 1857	Romania	Alba	H5	
Les Ormes		1 October 1857	France	Burgundy	L6	
Kaba	Kaba	15 April 1857	Hungary	Hajdú-Bihar	CV3	
Heredia		1 April 1857	Costa Rica	Heredia	H5	
Stavropol		24 March 1857	Russia	Stavropol Krai	L6	
Parnallee		28 February 1857	India	Tamil Nadu	LL3	
Trenzano		12 November 1856	Italy	Lombardy	H3	
Oviedo		5 August 1856	Spain	Asturias	H5	
Beuste		9 February 1856	France	Aquitaine	L5	
Sabetmahet		16 August 1855	India	Uttar Pradesh	H5	
Petersburg		5 August 1855	United States	Tennessee	Eucrite-pmict	
St. Denis Westrem		7 June 1855	Belgium	East Flanders	L6	
Avilez		June 1855	Mexico	Durango	H	
Bremervörde		13 May 1855	Germany	Niedersachsen	H3	
Oesel	Oesel	11 May 1855	Estonia	—	L6	
Linum		5 September 1854	Germany	Brandenburg	L6	
Duruma		6 March 1853	Kenya	Kwale	L6	
Segowlie		4 March 1853	India	Bihar	LL6	
Girgenti		10 February 1853	Italy	Sicilia	L6	
Bustee		2 December 1852	India	Uttar Pradesh	Aubrite	
Borkut		13 October 1852	Ukraine	Zakarpattia Oblast	L5	
Mezö-Madaras		4 September 1852	Romania	Mureș County	L3	
Yatoor		23 January 1852	India	Andhra Pradesh	H5	
Nulles		5 November 1851	Spain	Catalonia	H6	
Gütersloh		17 April 1851	Germany	North Rhine-Westphalia	H3	
Quincay		1851 Summer	France	Poitou-Charentes	L6	
Shalka		30 November 1850	India	West Bengal	Diogenite	
Kesen	Kesen	13 June 1850	Japan	Tohoku	H4	
Monroe		31 October 1849	United States	North Carolina	H4	
Ski		27 December 1848	Norway	Akershus	L6	
Marmande		4 July 1848	France	Aquitaine	L5	
Castine		20 May 1848	United States	Maine	L6	
Dharwar		15 February 1848	India	Karnataka	OC	
Braunau		14 July 1847	Czech Republic	Hradec Králové Region	IIAB iron	
Marion (Iowa)		25 February 1847	United States	Iowa	L6	
Schönenberg		25 December 1846	Germany	Bavaria	L6	
Cape Girardeau		14 August 1846	United States	Missouri	H6	
Monte Milone	Monte Milone	8 May 1846	Italy	Marche	L5	
Le Teilleul		14 July 1845	France	Normandy	Howardite	
Le Pressoir		25 January 1845	France	Centre-Val de Loire	H5	
Favars		21 October 1844	France	Midi-Pyrénées	H5	
Killeter		29 April 1844	Ireland	Ulster	H6	
Cosina		January 1844	Mexico	Guanajuato	H5	
Verkhne Tschirskaia		12 November 1843	Russia	Volgograd Oblast	H5	
Klein-Wenden		16 September 1843	Germany	Thuringen	H6	
Picote		September 1843	Portugal	Braganca	Stone-uncl	
Manegaon		29 June 1843	India	Maharashtra	Diogenite	
Utrecht		2 June 1843	Netherlands	Utrecht	L6	
Bishopville		25 March 1843	United States	South Carolina	Aubrite	
Myhee Caunta		30 November 1842	India	Gujarat	OC	
Barea		4 July 1842	Spain	La Rioja	Mesosiderite	
Aumieres		3 June 1842	France	Languedoc-Roussillon	L6	
Milena		26 April 1842	Croatia	—	L6	
St. Christophe-la-Chartreuse		5 November 1841	France	Pays de la Loire	L6	
Château-Renard		12 June 1841	France	Centre-Val de Loire	L6	
Grüneberg		22 March 1841	Poland	Lubusz Voivodeship	H4	
Cereseto		17 July 1840	Italy	Piemonte	H5	
Uden		12 June 1840	Netherlands	North Brabant	LL6	
Karakol		9 May 1840	Kazakhstan	Abai Region	LL6	
Little Piney		13 February 1839	United States	Missouri	L5	
Cold Bokkeveld		13 October 1838	South Africa	Western Cape	CM2	
Montlivault		22 July 1838	France	Centre-Val de Loire	L6	
Chandakapur		6 June 1838	India	Maharashtra	L5	
Akbarpur	Akbarpur	18 April 1838	India	Uttar Pradesh	H4	
Kaee		29 January 1838	India	Uttar Pradesh	H5	
Esnandes		August 1837	France	Poitou-Charentes	L6	
Gross-Divina		24 July 1837	Slovakia	Žilina Region	H5	
Yonozu		13 July 1837	Japan	Tohoku	H4	
Macau		11 November 1836	Brazil	Rio Grande do Norte	H5	
Aubres		14 September 1836	France	Auvergne-Rhône-Alpes	Aubrite	
Mascombes		31 January 1836	France	Limousin	L6	
Aldsworth		4 August 1835	United Kingdom	England	LL4	
Charlotte		31 July 1835	United States	Tennessee	IVA iron	
Charwallas		12 June 1834	India	Haryana	H6	
Okniny		8 January 1834	Ukraine	Volyn Oblast	LL6	
Blansko		25 November 1833	Czech Republic	South Moravian Region	H6	
Wessely		9 September 1831	Czech Republic	South Moravian Region	H5	
Vouillé		13 May 1831	France	Poitou-Charentes	L6	
Perth		17 May 1830	United Kingdom	Scotland	LL4	
Launton		15 February 1830	United Kingdom	England	L6	
Krasnoi-Ugol		9 September 1829	Russia	Ryazan Oblast	L6	
Deal		15 August 1829	United States	New Jersey	L6	
Forsyth		8 May 1829	United States	Georgia	L6	
Richmond		4 June 1828	United States	Virginia	LL4	
Bialystok	Białystok	5 October 1827	Poland	Podlaskie Voivodeship	Eucrite-pmict	
Drake Creek		9 May 1827	United States	Tennessee	L6	
Mhow		16 February 1827	India	Uttar Pradesh	L6	
Pavlograd		19 May 1826	Ukraine	Dnipropetrovsk	L6	
Galapian		May 1826 or August	France	Aquitaine	H6	
Mineo	Mineo	May 1826	Italy	Sicilia	Pallasite	
Honolulu		27 September 1825	United States	Hawaii	L5	
Nanjemoy		10 February 1825	United States	Maryland	H6	
Zebrak		14 October 1824	Czech Republic	Central Bohemian Region	H5	
Tounkin		18 February 1824	Russia	Buryatia	OC	
Renazzo	Renazzo	15 January 1824	Italy	Emilia-Romagna	CR2	112
Nobleborough		7 August 1823	United States	Maine	Eucrite-pmict	
Botschetschki		1823	Ukraine	Sumy	L4	
Futtehpur		30 November 1822	India	Uttar Pradesh	L6	
Épinal		13 September 1822	France	Lorraine	H5	
Kadonah		7 August 1822	India	Uttar Pradesh	H6	
Clohars		21 June 1822	France	Brittany	L4	
Angers	Angers	3 June 1822	France	Pays de la Loire	L6	
Umbala		1822 or 1823	India	Punjab	LL4	
Juvinas		15 June 1821	France	Auvergne-Rhône-Alpes	Eucrite-mmict	
Lixna		12 July 1820	Latvia	—	H4	
Pohlitz		13 October 1819	Germany	Thuringia	L5	
Jonzac		13 June 1819	France	Poitou-Charentes	Eucrite-mmict	
Slobodka		10 August 1818	Russia	Smolensk Oblast	L4	
Seres		June 1818	Greece	Central Macedonia	H4	
Zaborzika		11 April 1818	Ukraine	Zhytomyr	L6	
Hachi-oji		29 December 1817	Japan	Kantō	H?	
Chassigny	Chassigny	3 October 1815	France	Champagne-Ardenne	Martian (chassignite)	
Durala		18 February 1815	India	Punjab	L6	
Chail		5 November 1814	India	Uttar Pradesh	H6	
Gurram Konda		October 1814	India	Andhra Pradesh	L6	
Agen	Agen	5 September 1814	France	Aquitaine	H5	
Bachmut		15 February 1814	Ukraine	Donetsk	L6	
Luotolax		13 December 1813	Finland	South Karelia	Howardite	
Limerick		10 September 1813	Ireland	Munster	H5	
Borodino		5 September 1812	Russia	Moscow Oblast	H5	
Chantonnay		5 August 1812	France	Pays de la Loire	L6	
Erxleben		15 April 1812	Germany	Sachsen-Anhalt	H6	
Toulouse		10 April 1812	France	Midi-Pyrénées	H6	
Punganaru		23 November 1811	India	Andhra Pradesh	Stone-uncl	
Berlanguillas		8 July 1811	Spain	Castile and León	L6	
Kuleschovka		12 March 1811	Ukraine	Sumy	L6	
Charsonville		23 November 1810	France	Centre-Val de Loire	H6	
Mooresfort		August 1810	Ireland	Munster	H5	
Caswell County		30 January 1810	United States	North Carolina	OC	
Kikino		1809	Russia	Smolensk Oblast	H6	
Lissa		3 September 1808	Czech Republic	Central Bohemian Region	L6	
Stannern	Stannern	22 May 1808	Czech Republic	Vysocina	Eucrite-mmict	
Borgo San Donino		19 April 1808	Italy	Emilia-Romagna	LL6	
Moradabad		1808	India	Uttar Pradesh	L6	
Weston	Weston	14 December 1807	United States	Connecticut	H4	
Timochin		25 March 1807	Russia	Kaluga Oblast	H5	
Alais	Alais	15 March 1806	France	Languedoc-Roussillon	CI1	
Doroninsk		6 April 1805	Russia	Zabaykalsky Krai	H5	
Asco		November 1805	France	Corsica	H6	
Bocas		24 November 1804	Mexico	San Luis Potosí	L6	
High Possil		5 April 1804	United Kingdom	Scotland	L6	
Darmstadt		1804 (before)	Germany	Hessen	H5	
Mässing		13 December 1803	Germany	Bavaria	Howardite	
Apt		8 October 1803	France	Provence-Alpes-Côte d'Azur	L6	
L'Aigle	L'Aigle	26 April 1803	France	Normandy	L6	
Mauritius		December 1801 (before)	Mauritius	—	LL5-6	
Saint-Ouen-en-Champagne		29 September 1799	France	Pays de la Loire	H5	
Benares (a)		19 December 1798	India	Uttar Pradesh	LL4	
Salles		12 March 1798	France	Rhône-Alpes	L5	
Portugal		19 February 1796	Portugal	Évora	Stone-uncl	
Bjelaja Zerkov		15 January 1796	Ukraine	Kyiv	H6	
Wold Cottage	Wold Cottage	13 December 1795	United Kingdom	England	L6	
Mulletiwu		13 April 1795	Sri Lanka	Northern	L	
Siena		16 June 1794	Italy	Tuscany	LL5	

== See also ==
- Glossary of meteoritics
- Meteorite fall statistics
