= Viñales meteorite =

Meteorite found in Cuba

Viñales
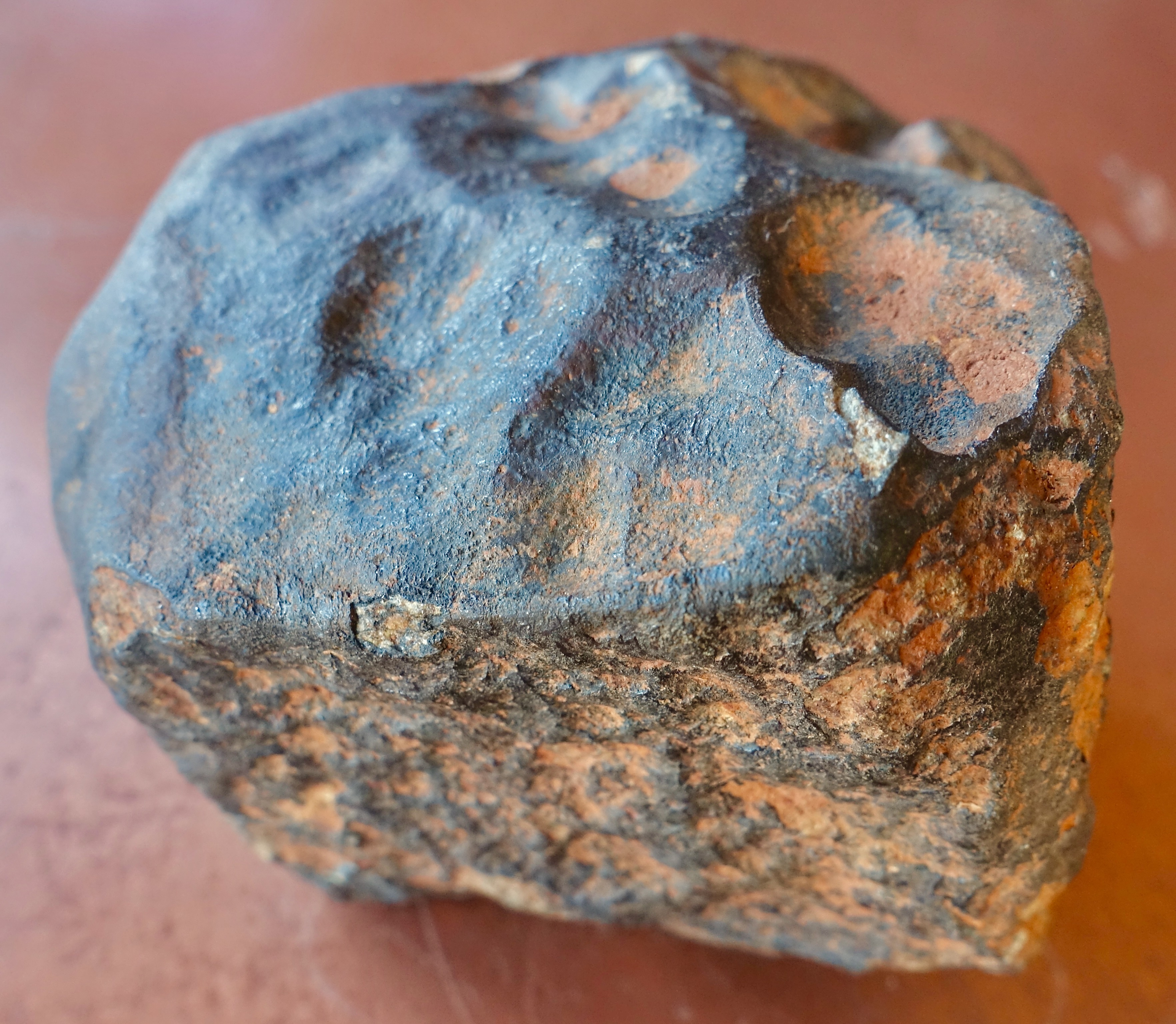
- Specimen from the Viñales Meteorite fall.
- Type: Stone
- Class: L6 chondrite
- Country: Cuba
- Region: Pinar Del Rio Province
- Coordinates: 22°37′N 83°44′W
- Observed fall: Yes
- Fall date: 1 February 2019
- TKW: 50-100 kg

The Viñales meteorite is an L6 meteorite which entered the atmosphere and broke up over Pinar del Río Province at the western end of Cuba at 1:19 pm local time on 1 February 2019. The bolide was accompanied by loud sonic booms and a smoke trail was observed. A shower of meteorites fell on Viñales Valley and hundreds of samples were collected by local residents.
