= Andura meteorite =

1939 meteor impact in India

Andura
- Type: Chondrite
- Class: Ordinary chondrite
- Group: H6
- Country: India
- Region: Maharashtra
- Coordinates: 20°53′N 76°52′E
- Observed fall: Yes
- TKW: 17,9 kg

Andura is an H chondrite meteorite that fell to Earth on 9 August 1939, in Maharashtra, India. It is classified as ordinary chondrite and belongs to the petrologic type 6, thus was assigned to the group H6.

== See also ==
- Glossary of meteoritics
- Meteorite falls
- Ordinary chondrite
