= Ankober (meteorite) =

Meteorite found in Ethiopia

- Type: Chondrite
- Class: Ordinary chondrite
- Group: H4
- Country: Ethiopia
- Region: Shewa
- Coordinates: 9°32′N 39°43′E
- Observed fall: Yes
- Fall date: July 7, 1942
- TKW: 6.5 kg

Ankober is an H chondrite meteorite that fell to Earth on July 7, 1942, in Shewa, Ethiopia.

== Classification ==
It is classified as H4-ordinary chondrite.

== See also ==
- Glossary of meteoritics
- Meteorite falls
- Ordinary chondrite
