= Adzhi-Bogdo =

Meteorite found in Mongolia

- Type: Chondrite
- Group: LL3
- Country: Mongolia
- Region: Govi-Altay
- Coordinates: 44°50′N 95°10′E
- Observed fall: No
- Found date: 1949-10-30
- TKW: 910 grams (32 oz)

The Adzhi-Bogdo is a chondrite meteorite weighing 910 grams (32 oz). It was found on October 30, 1949, in Govi-Altay, Mongolia.

== See also ==
- Glossary of meteoritics
