= Sulagiri (meteorite) =

Meteorite found in India

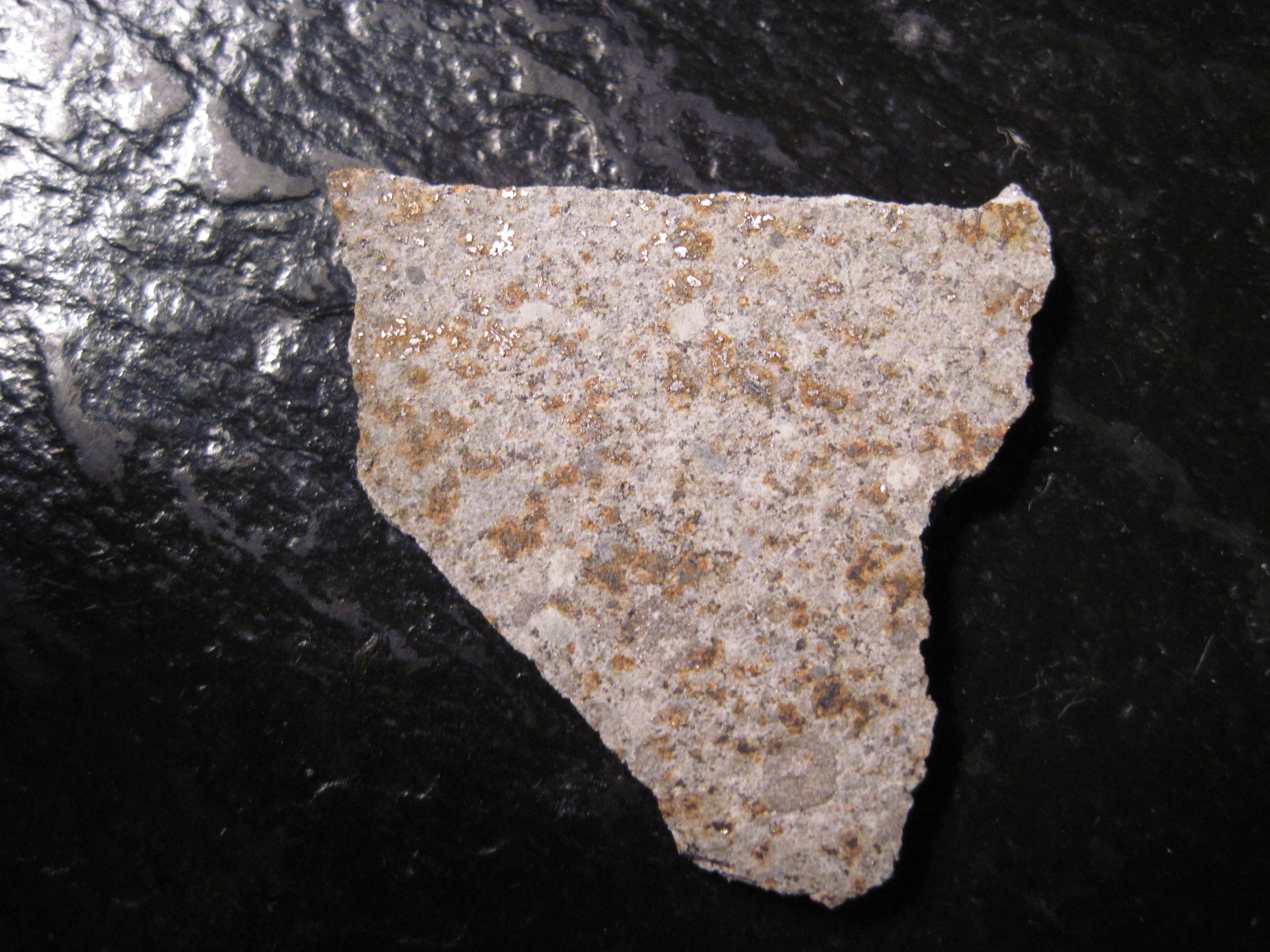
- A slice of the meteorite
- Type: Chondrite
- Class: Ordinary chondrite
- Shock stage: S2
- Country: India
- Region: Sulagiri, Krishnagiri District, Tamil Nadu
- Coordinates: 12°02′00″N 78°02′00″E
- Observed fall: Yes
- Fall date: 12 September 2008; 08:30 hours (IST) (UTC+5.5)
- TKW: >110 kilograms (240 lb)

Sulagiri is the official name of the meteorite which fell on 12 September 2008 in Sulagiri, Krishnagiri District, Tamil Nadu, India.

== History ==
On 12 September 2008, around 08:30, the meteorite fell from the northwestern sky, as observed by several people residing in the villages around the town of Sulaguri. According to the eyewitnesses, they heard a screeching sound and a bang. It was followed by house shaking explosions. Bright flashes and smoke were also observed.

Noble gases, nitrogen and cosmic ray exposure age of the Sulagiri chondrite. The cosmic ray exposure age of Sulagiri chondrite is 27.9 ± 3.4 Ma. Krypton and xenon isotopes indicate that heavy noble gases are mixture of various components. Nitrogen concentration in Sulagiri 0.35 ppm. The trapped nitrogen (corrected for cosmogenic) signature in Sulagiri is δ15N = −74 ± 24 (‰).
