= Ambapur Nagla meteorite =

Meteorite

Ambapur Nagla
- Type: Chondrite
- Class: Ordinary chondrite
- Group: H5
- Country: India
- Region: Uttar Pradesh
- Coordinates: 27°40′N 78°15′E
- Observed fall: Yes
- Fall date: 27 May 1895
- TKW: 6.4 kg

Ambapur Nagla is an H chondrite meteorite that fell to earth on 27 May 1895, in Uttar Pradesh, India. It is classified as H5-ordinary chondrite.

== See also ==
- Glossary of meteoritics
- Meteorite falls
- Ordinary chondrite
