= Bovedy (meteorite) =

Meteorite that impacted Northern Ireland

- Type: Chondrite
- Class: Ordinary chondrite
- Group: L3
- Country: United Kingdom
- Region: Northern Ireland
- Coordinates: 54°34′N 6°20′W
- Observed fall: Yes
- Fall date: April 1969
- TKW: 5.46 kg

Bovedy is a meteorite that fell in the area of Bovedy, Northern Ireland, on 25 April 1969. After entering the atmosphere over the Bristol Channel, it traversed Wales and the Irish Sea before landing near Limavady.

The meteorite had broken into two pieces. One piece smashed through the asbestos roof of a shop in Sprucefield, breaking into two further pieces. A larger piece of the meteorite was recovered days later in a farm field in Bovedy, 60 kilometres (37 mi) away.

== Composition and classification ==
The meteorite appeared to be brown and black, but the inside showed grey chondrules with flecks of metal within the meteorite. Before it separated on impact, the first fragment weighed 513g and the second fragment weighed 4,950g.

Bovedy is an ordinary chondrite from the L group that is petrologic type 3.

== See also ==
- Glossary of meteoritics
- Meteorite
- Ordinary chondrite
