= Varre-Sai meteorite =

Meteorite

Varre-Sai
- Type: L5
- Class: S4
- Country: Brazil
- Region: Rio de Janeiro
- Coordinates: 20°51′02.5″S 41°44′48.5″W
- Observed fall: Yes
- Fall date: June 19, 2010
- TKW: 2.5 kg

Varre-Sai meteorite is a meteorite found in Varre-Sai, in the interior of the state of Rio de Janeiro, Brazil. Its fall was observed on June 19, 2010, by Germano da Silva Oliveira, who heard several explosions and saw two black objects falling.

== See also ==
- Glossary of meteoritics
