= Benton meteorite =

Meteorite found in Canada

Benton
- Type: Chondrite
- Group: LL6
- Shock stage: S3
- Country: Canada
- Region: New Brunswick
- Coordinates: 45°57′N 67°33′W
- Observed fall: Yes
- Fall date: January 16, 1949, about 4:00pm
- TKW: 2.84 kilograms (6.3 lb)

Benton is a meteorite found near the village of Benton, New Brunswick following a fireball. Two masses were found but the meteorites were split up. The largest fragment is now in the Canadian National Meteorite Collection, Ottawa.

== Classification ==
It is classified as LL6-ordinary chondrite.

The geological history of Benton has four stages: chondrule formation and accumulation, brecciation, thermal metamorphism and finally shock vein formation.

== See also ==
- Glossary of meteoritics
- Meteorite fall
