= Anlong (meteorite) =

Meteorite found in China

- Type: Chondrite
- Class: Ordinary chondrite
- Group: H5
- Country: China
- Region: Guizhou
- Coordinates: 25°9′N 105°11′E
- Observed fall: Yes
- Fall date: May 2, 1971
- TKW: 2.5 kg

Anlong is an H chondrite meteorite that fell to earth on May 2, 1971, in Guizhou, China.

== Classification ==
It is classified as H5-ordinary chondrite.

== See also ==
- Glossary of meteoritics
- Meteorite falls
- Ordinary chondrite
