= Assisi (meteorite) =

Meteorite found in Italy

- Type: H5
- Country: Italy
- Region: Umbria
- Coordinates: 43°2′N 12°33′E
- Observed fall: Yes
- Fall date: 24/05/1886, 7am
- TKW: 2 kg

Assisi is an H chondrite meteorite that fell to earth at 7:00 am on May 24, 1886, in Perugia, Umbria, Italy.

Only one single 2 kilograms (4.4 lb) stone was found.

== Classification ==
It is an ordinary chondrite and belongs to the petrologic type 5, thus was assigned to the group H5.

== See also ==
- Glossary of meteoritics
- Meteorite falls
- Ordinary chondrite
