= Sazovice =

- Municipality
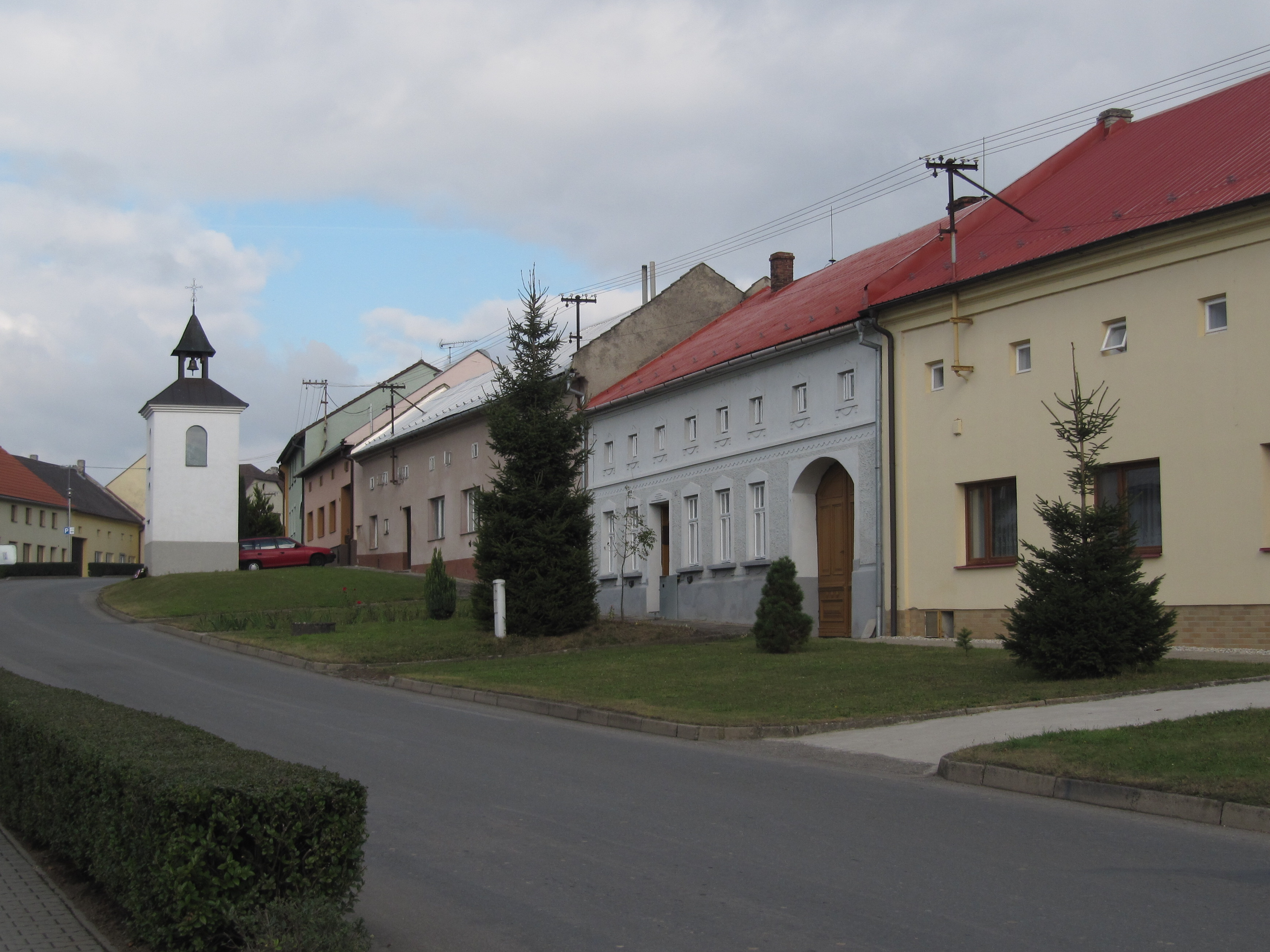
- Main street with a belfry

- Flag Coat of arms

- Location in the Czech Republic
- Coordinates: 49°14′27″N 17°34′7″E
- Country: Czech Republic
- Region: Zlín
- District: Zlín
- First mentioned: 1362

Area
  - Total: 3.92 km^{2} (1.51 sq mi)
- Elevation: 207 m (679 ft)

Population (2026-01-01)
  - Total: 899
  - Density: 229/km^{2} (594/sq mi)
- Time zone: UTC+1 (CET)
  - Summer (DST): UTC+2 (CEST)
- Postal code: 763 01
- Website: www.sazovice.cz

Sazovice is a municipality and village in Zlín District in the Zlín Region of the Czech Republic. It has about 900 inhabitants.

Sazovice is approximately 8 kilometres (5 mi) west of Zlín and 246 km (153 mi) south-east of Prague.

== Demographics ==
Historical population
Year	Pop.	±%
1869	383	—
1880	454	+18.5%
1890	555	+22.2%
1900	569	+2.5%
1910	538	−5.4%
1921	543	+0.9%
1930	585	+7.7%
1950	583	−0.3%
1961	628	+7.7%
1970	620	−1.3%
1980	583	−6.0%
1991	580	−0.5%
2001	681	+17.4%
2011	708	+4.0%
2021	751	+6.1%
Source: Censuses
