= Ouadangou =

Ouadangou Ouagadougou
- Location in Burkina Faso
- Coordinates: 12°55′02″N 0°6′55″W
- Country: Burkina Faso
- Region: Est Region
- Province: Gnagna Province
- Department: Bogandé Department

Population (2019)
  - Total: 5,570

Ouadangou is a town in the Bogandé Department of Gnagna Province in eastern Burkina Faso.

Population
| Year | Pop. | ±% |
|---|---|---|
| 1985 | 2,268 | — |
| 2006 | 3,189 | +40.6% |
| 2019 | 5,570 | +74.7% |
