= Leonovka =

Leonovka Леоновка
- Selo
- Location within Republic of Buryatia Location within Russia
- Coordinates: 51°44′N 109°44′E
- Country: Russia
- Region: Republic of Buryatia
- District: Kizhinginsky District
- Time zone: UTC+8:00

Leonovka (Russian: Леоновка) is a rural locality (a selo) in Kizhinginsky District, Republic of Buryatia, Russia. The population was 222 as of 2010. There are 2 streets.

== Geography ==
Leonovka is located 17 km southwest of Kizhinga (the district's administrative centre) by road. Edermeg is the nearest rural locality.
