= Chegon =

Chegon Чегон
- Selo
- Location within Altai Krai Location within Russia
- Coordinates: 51°27′N 84°42′E
- Country: Russia
- Region: Altai Krai
- District: Soloneshensky District

Chegon (Russian: Чегон) is a rural locality (a selo) in Stepnoy Selsoviet, Soloneshensky District, Altai Krai, Russia. The population was 35 as of 2013.

== Geography ==
Chegon is located on the Chegon River, 45 kilometres (28 mi) southeast of Soloneshnoye (the district's administrative centre) by road. Stepnoye is the nearest rural locality.
