= Jalandhar (meteorite) =

Iron meteorite, fell 1621

Jalandhar is an Iron meteorite that was observed to fall near present-day Jalandhar in Punjab, India, on 10 April 1621. The meteorite is notable as it is the oldest documented meteorite fall from the Indian subcontinent and because the iron meteorite on the orders of the Mughal emperor Jahangir was used to forge weapons – a knife, a dagger and two swords. Today, the knife - as the only surviving blade - is part of the collection of the National Museum of Asian Art at the Smithsonian Institution in Washington D.C.

The meteorite is classified as an observed fall under the name "Jalandhar" in the Meteoritical Bulletin Database of the Meteoritical Society. It is listed with a total known mass of about 1.967 kg and an approximate location near 31°N, 75°E and is the eighth oldest confirmed meteorite fall recorded in the Meteoritical Bulletin Database.

== History ==
The fall of the meteorite is described in detail in the memoirs (Tuzk-e-Jahangiri) of Mughal emperor Jahangir, who was reigning the Mughal Empire from 1605 until his death in 1627.

“At dawn a tremendous noise arose in the east. It was so terrifying that it nearly frightened the inhabitants out of their skins. Then, in the midst of the tumultuous noise, something bright fell to the earth from above. The people thought fire was falling from heaven. A moment later the noise ceased, and the people regained their composure.”

As described in the autobiography of Jahangir, the iron mass was recovered by a tax collector named Muhammad Sayd, who placed the meteorite in a purse, sealed it, and sent it to court. Jahangir commissioned craftsmen at his court to forge weapons from the material:

“I ordered it weighed in my presence. It weighed 160 tolas [equivalent to 1.9 to 2 kg]. I ordered Master Daud to make a sword, dagger, and knife of it and show them to me. He said that the metal wouldn't hold up under the hammer and would break apart. I said that in that case he could mix it with other iron to make it workable. Just as I had ordered, he mixed three parts of the "lightning" iron with one part of other iron and produced two swords and one dagger he showed me. From the admixture of the other iron it had acquired a watered effect and flexed like a real Yemeni or southern blade. I ordered it tried in my presence. It cut beautifully, as well as the very best swords.”

Thanks to this detailed records in Jahangirs autobiography, the meteorite of Jalandhar is one of the best-documented pre-modern meteorite falls around the world.

== Cultural significance ==
The blades forged from the fallen mass are a prominent example for processing of Meteoric iron. The Mughal knife in the Smithsonian's Freer Gallery of Art is the only preserved piece. It can be easily identified as being made of meteoritic iron, as the kamacite and taenite phases create a natural damascene pattern on the blades. The blade's wavy grain is attributed to pattern welding, a process in which two metals are forge-welded and then etched, producing a characteristic layered appearance. In the 1980s, X-ray fluorescence analysis carried out by the Smithsonian Institution identified regions with elevated nickel content, supporting the conclusion that the blade incorporates meteoritic iron.

The knife also has an inscription on the spine of the blade, starting at the edge of the handle, that reads:

“There fell in the time of Jahangir Shah | From lightening-iron, a lightening-like, precious piece | Jahangir, [son of] Akbar ordered to make of that | Two swords, this knife and a dagger. | In the year 1030 [1621 A.D.] In the year 16 [of Jahangir's accession] 146.”

The knife was offered to the Smithsonian Institution in 1955 by Malek M. Sahami, an Iranian-born collector and attorney in Washington, DC. According to a letter, the object was on display in the meteorite display at the United States National Museum when Malek M. Sahami offered the object.
