= Bherai =

Village in Gujarat state, India

Coordinates: 20°58′N 71°29′E

Bherai is a village in Rajula Taluka of Amreli district, Gujarat, India.

== History ==
Bherai is said to have been populated about 200 years ago by one Sadul Mamaiyo of the Ram tribe of Ahirs. The oldest of the paliyas are dated about 1687 corresponding to Samvat 1743. The waste site of old Bherai is about 300 yards to the east of the present village.

Bherai was founded by Ahirs and was ruled by Ahir Garasiya (landholders) for a minimum period of 300 years.

== Geography ==
Bherai is situated on a branch of the Devrapuri creek called Dukhden (or trouble-giving) from its numerous windings. During the British period, the princely state had excavated a straight channel to connect Bherai with the Devrapuri creek. This channel is called Sukhden or ease-giving.

== Demography ==
The population according to the census of 1872 was 841 souls and increased in 1881 to 1171.

== Economy ==
Bherai had a good trade during the cotton season. Much salt is produced near this town, and pearls are occasionally found in the oysters of the creek.

To the north of Bherai, there is a quarry of yellow stone resembling marble. There is also a large quantity of a light-coloured soft clay called bhutdo which was largely used by locals for washing their hair; the special quality of this clay is that it leaves the hair soft and not dry and hard as lime-juice, aritha etc. do. Senna plants grows here.
