= Air France fleet =

List of aircraft operated by Air France

Air France operates a fleet of 229 aircraft, most of which are manufactured by Airbus. The airline's fleet of narrow-body aircraft comprises all four Airbus A320 family variants. The airline's wide-body fleet, consisting of the Airbus A330, Airbus A350, Boeing 777, and Boeing 787 Dreamliner families, serve medium to long-haul routes. The airline had also ordered the short-haul Airbus A220-300s to replace their aging Airbus A318s and A319s. In September 2023, Air France-KLM announced an order for 50 Airbus A350 aircraft which will be shared between Air France and KLM to replace their aging Airbus A330 and Boeing 777-200ER aircraft.

== Current fleet ==
As of October 2026, Air France operates the following aircraft:

Air France fleet
Aircraft	In service	Orders	Passengers					Notes
Aircraft	In service	Orders	F	J	W	Y	Total	Notes
Airbus A220-300	60	60	—	—	—	148	148	Order with 30 options. Replacing Airbus A318-100 and Airbus A319-100.
Airbus A318-100	4	—	—	—	—	131	131	Last airline operator. To be retired and replaced by Airbus A220-300.
Airbus A319-100	1	—	—	—	—	142	142	To be retired and replaced by Airbus A220-300.
Airbus A319-100	1	—	—	—	—	143	143	To be retired and replaced by Airbus A220-300.
Airbus A320-200	36	—	—	—	—	174	174	
Airbus A320-200	36	—	—	—	—	178	178	
Airbus A321-200	8	—	—	—	—	200	200	
Airbus A321-200	8	—	—	—	—	212	212	
Airbus A330-200	6	—	—	36	21	167	224	To be retired in early 2027 and replaced by Airbus A350-900. One crashed in 2009 as Air France Flight 447.
Airbus A350-900	43	25	—	48	32	212	292	Order with 40 options to be shared between Air France and KLM and delivered from 2026 to 2030. Replacing Airbus A330-200 and older Boeing 777.
Airbus A350-900	43	25	—	34	24	266	324	Order with 40 options to be shared between Air France and KLM and delivered from 2026 to 2030. Replacing Airbus A330-200 and older Boeing 777.
Airbus A350-900	43	25	—	48	32	210	290	Order with 40 options to be shared between Air France and KLM and delivered from 2026 to 2030. Replacing Airbus A330-200 and older Boeing 777.
Boeing 777-200ER	18	—	—	28	32	268	328	To be retired and replaced by Airbus A350-900.
Boeing 777-300ER	43	—	4	58	28	206	296	All remaining aircraft to be reconfigured to a 312-seat configuration.
Boeing 777-300ER	43	—	—	48	48	273	369	All remaining aircraft to be reconfigured to a 312-seat configuration.
Boeing 777-300ER	43	—	4	60	44	204	312	Launch customer.
Boeing 777-300ER	43	—	—	14	28	430	472	Launch customer.
Boeing 787-9	10	—	—	30	21	228	279	
Air France Cargo fleet
Airbus A350F	—	3	Cargo					
Boeing 777F	2	—	Cargo					Launch customer. To be retired and replaced by Airbus A350F.

=== Gallery ===
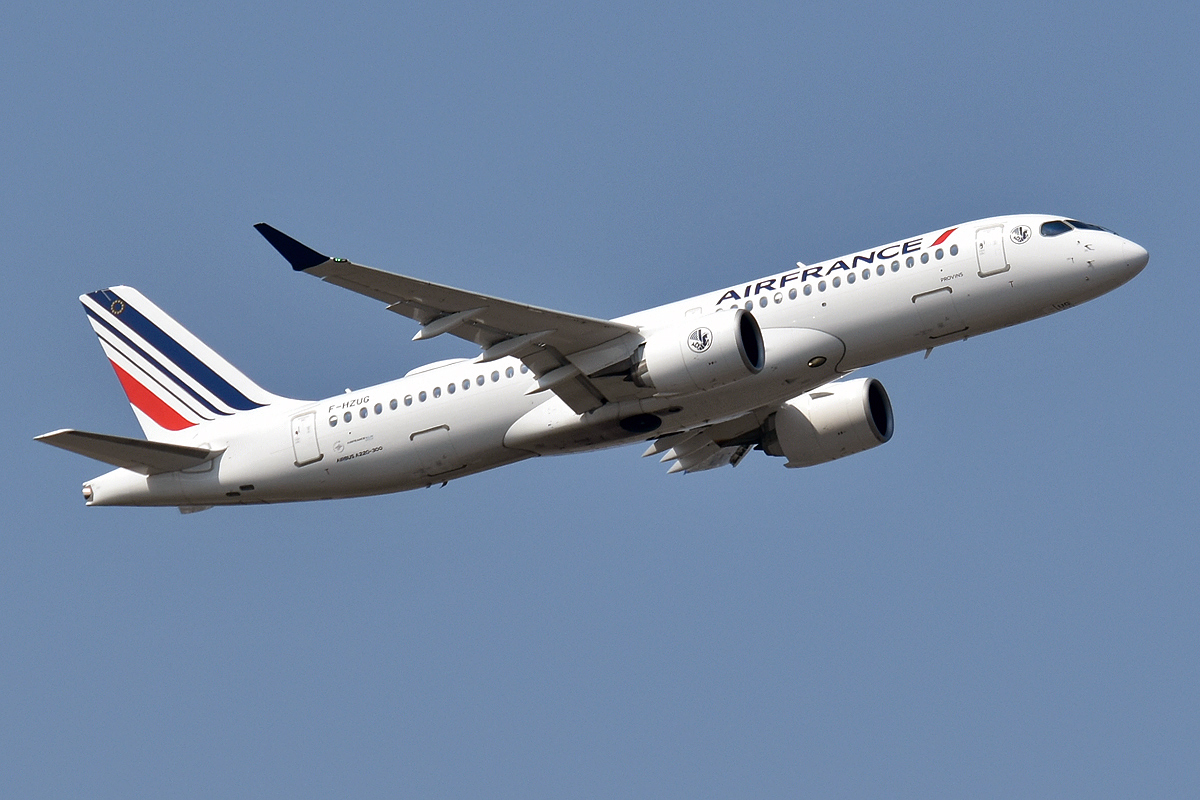
Airbus A220-300

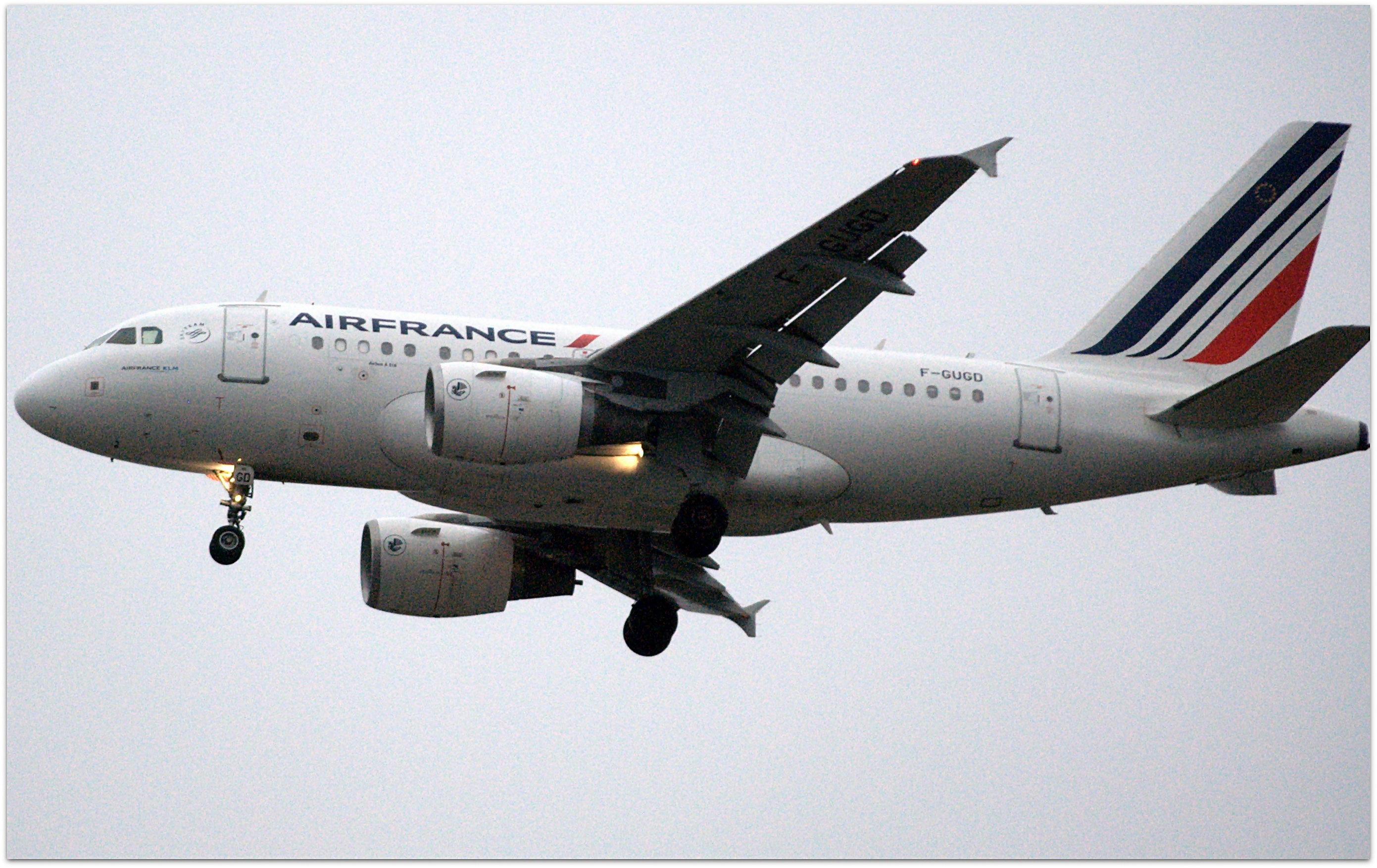
Airbus A318-100

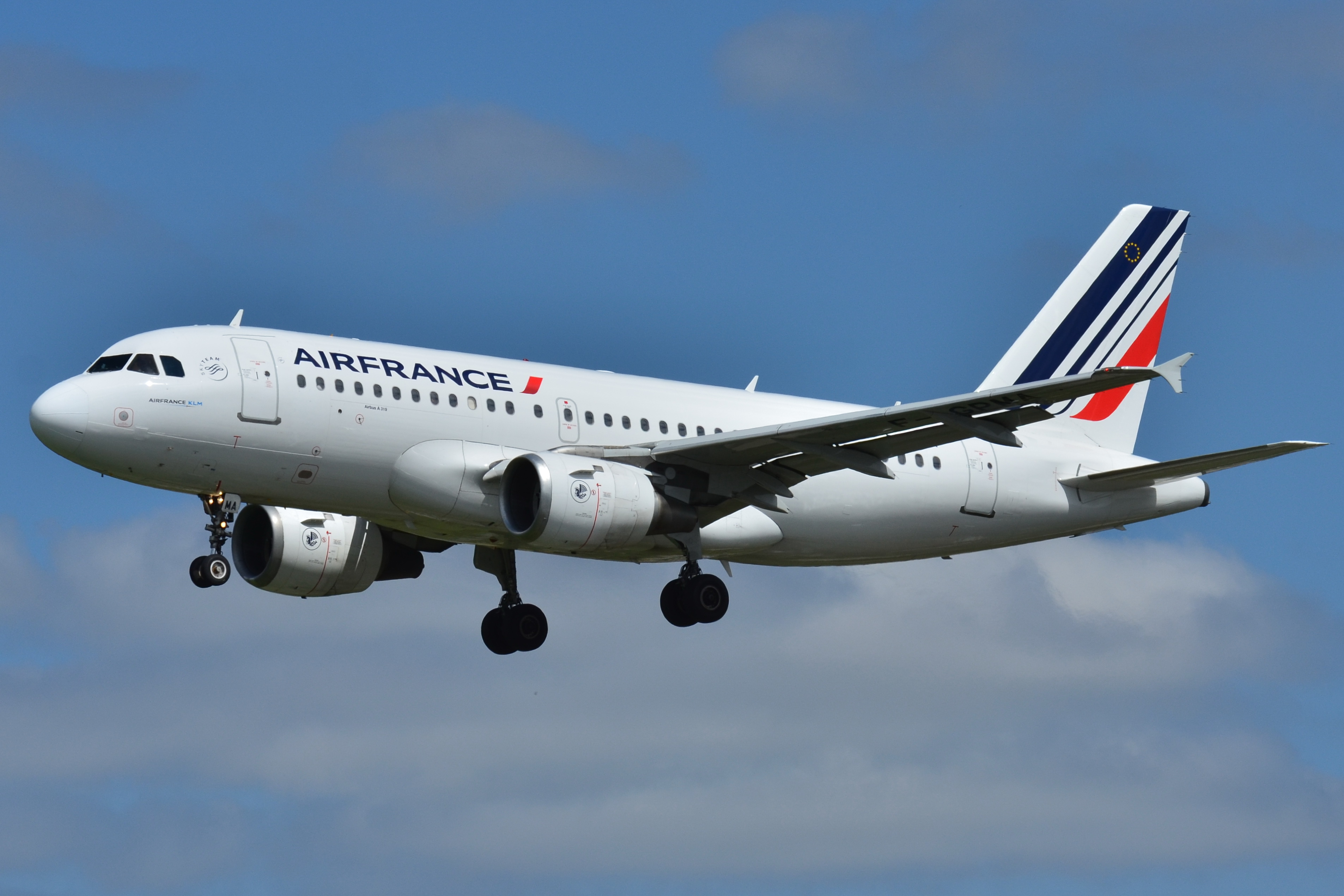
Airbus A319-100

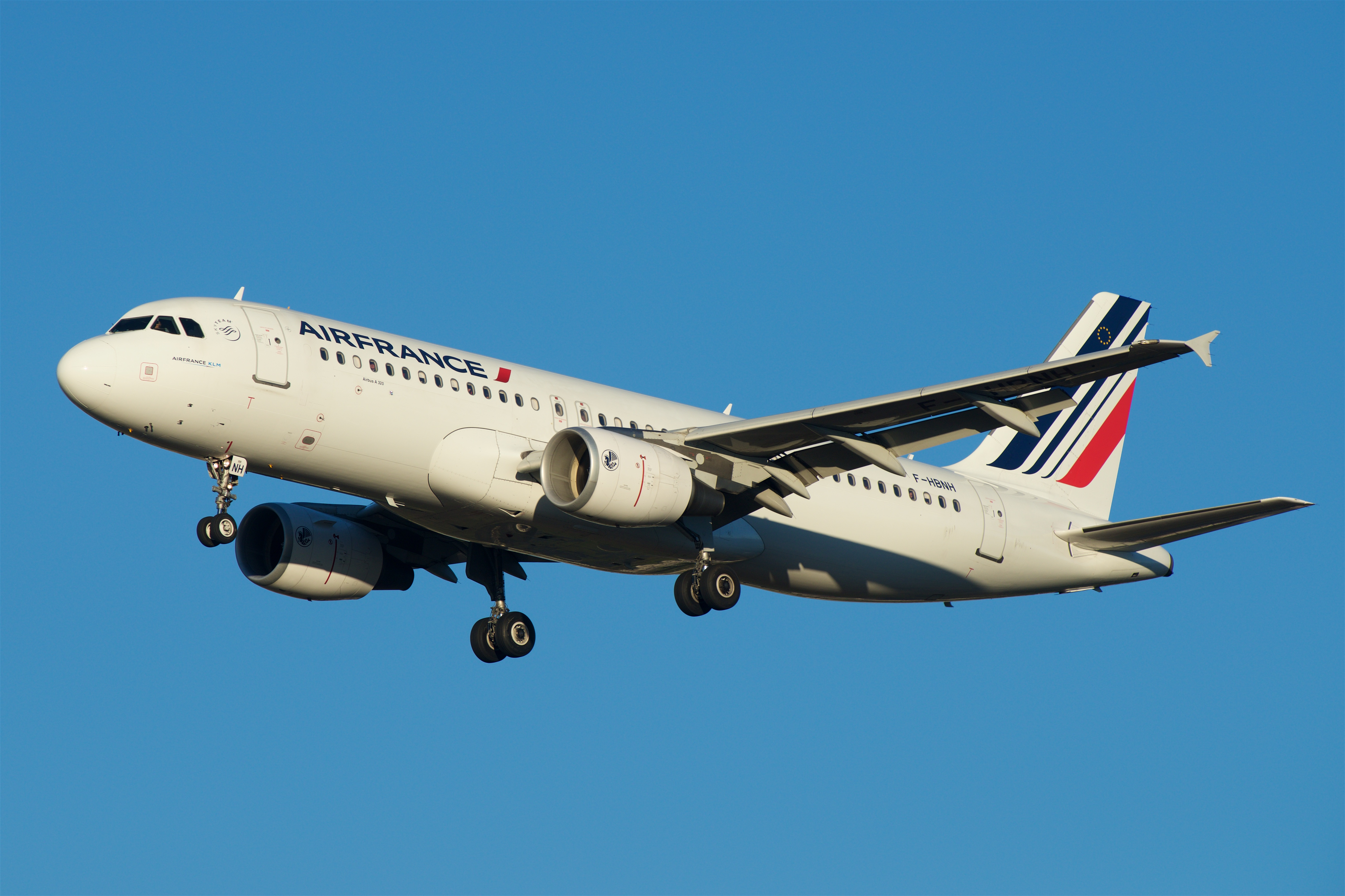
Airbus A320-200

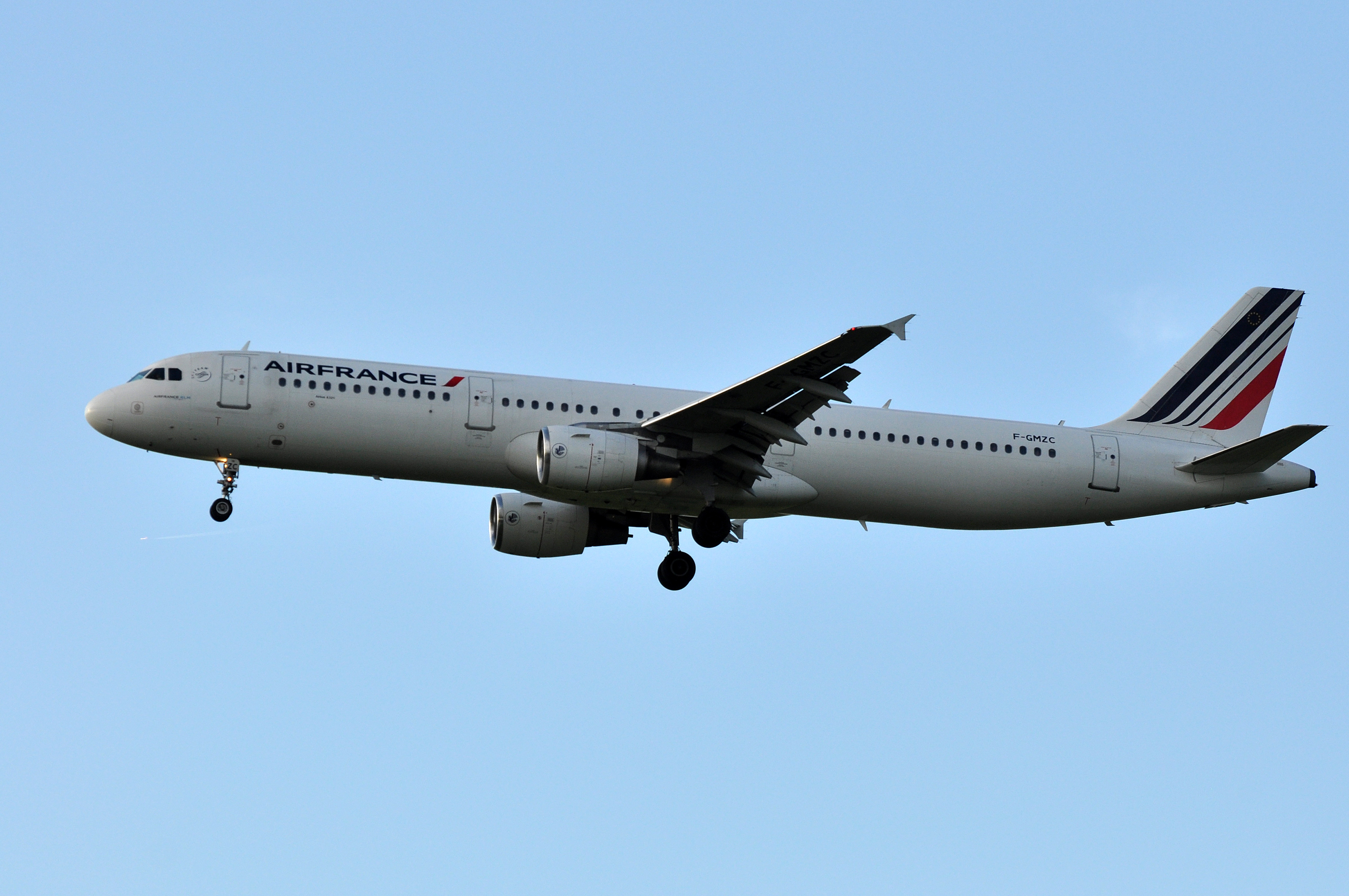
Airbus A321-100

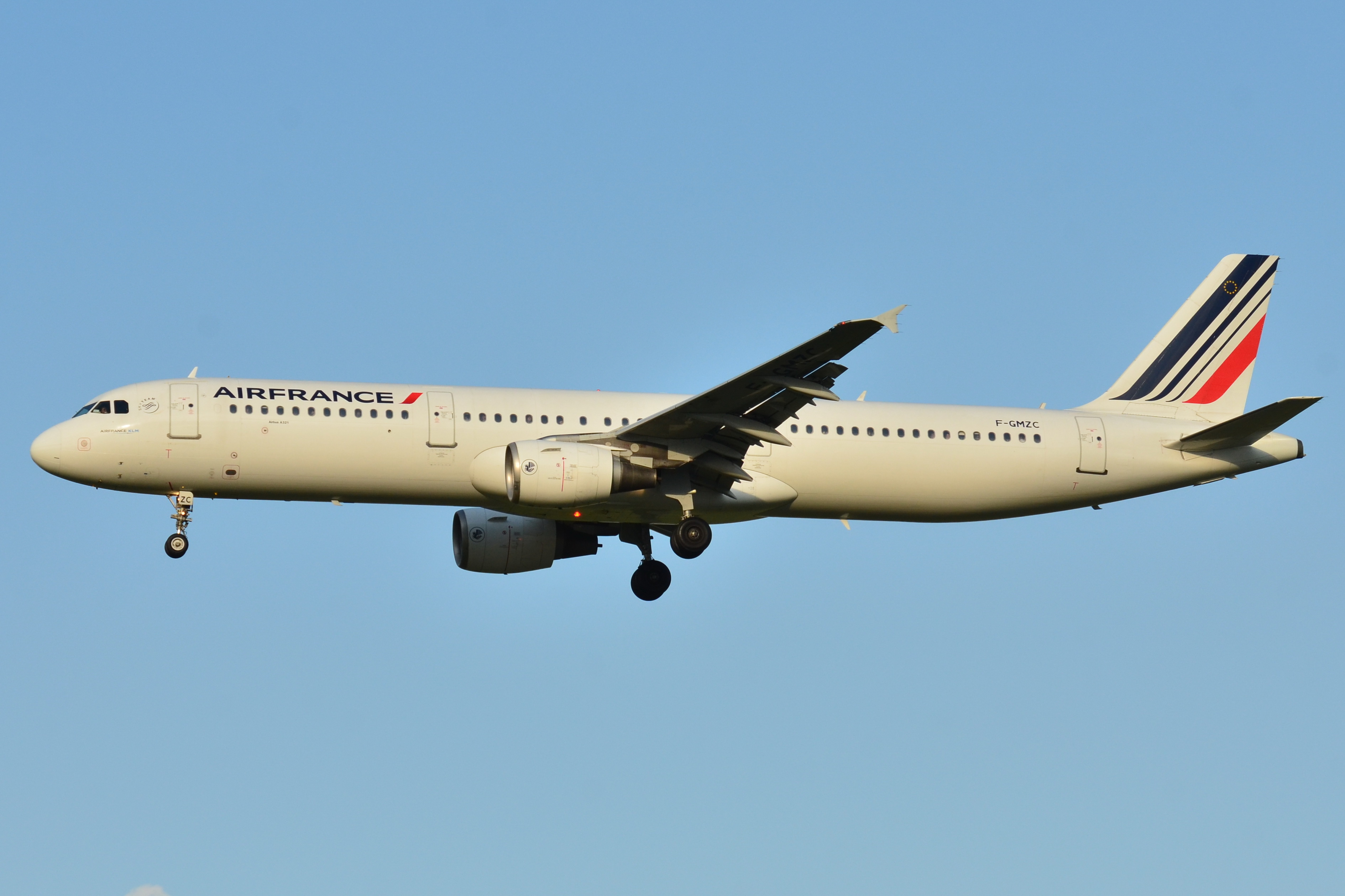
Airbus A321-200

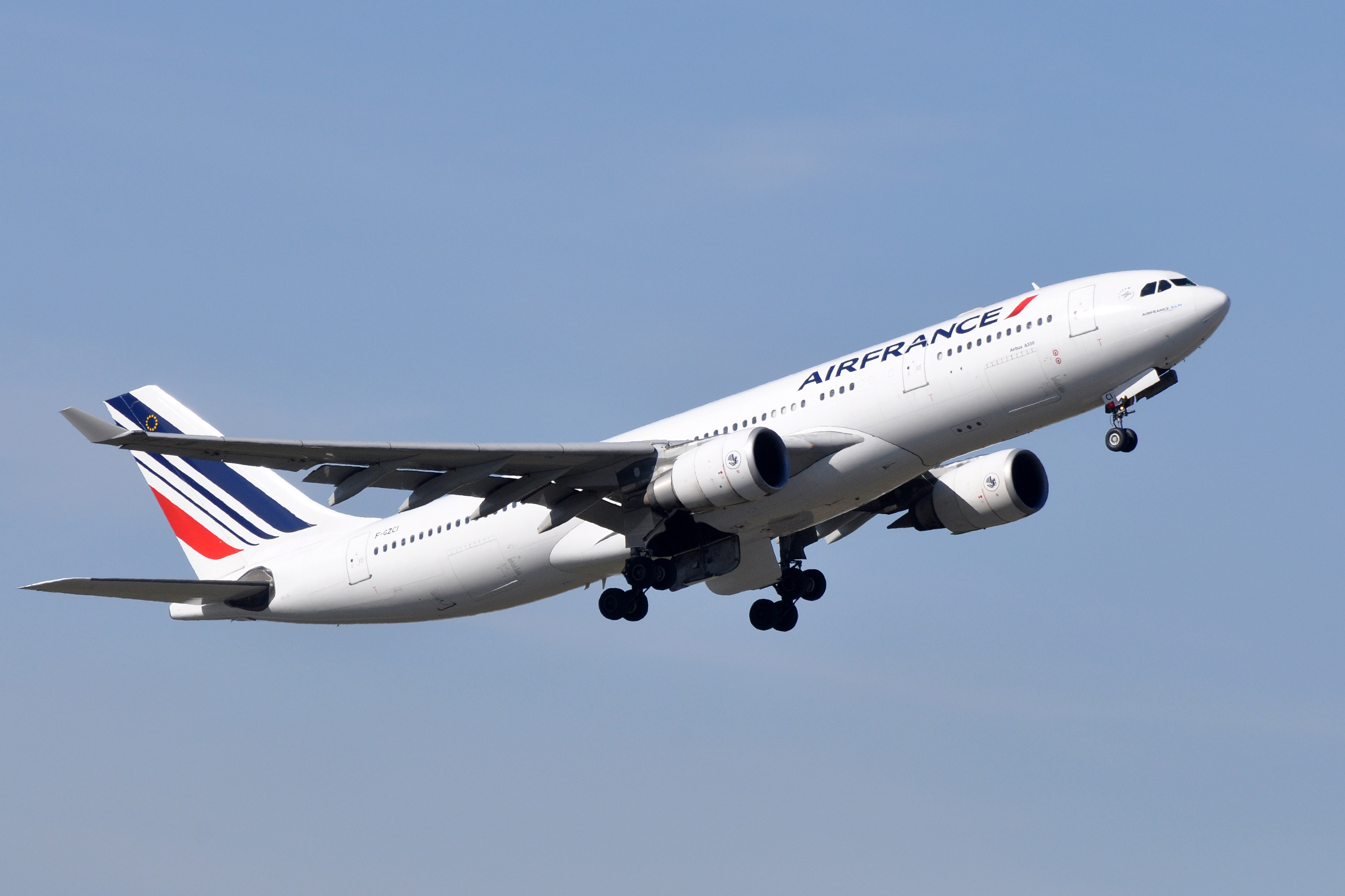
Airbus A330-200

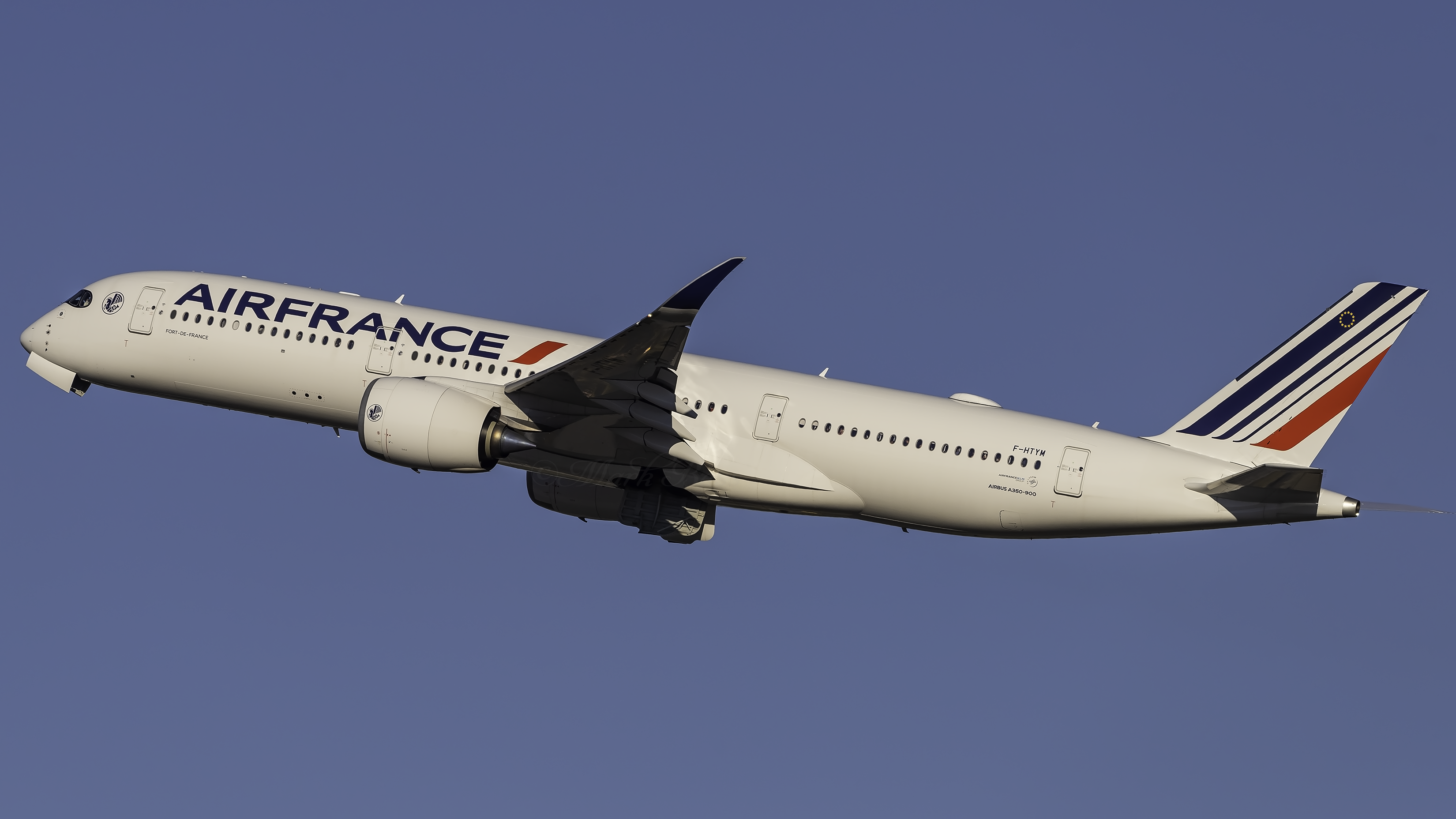
Airbus A350-900

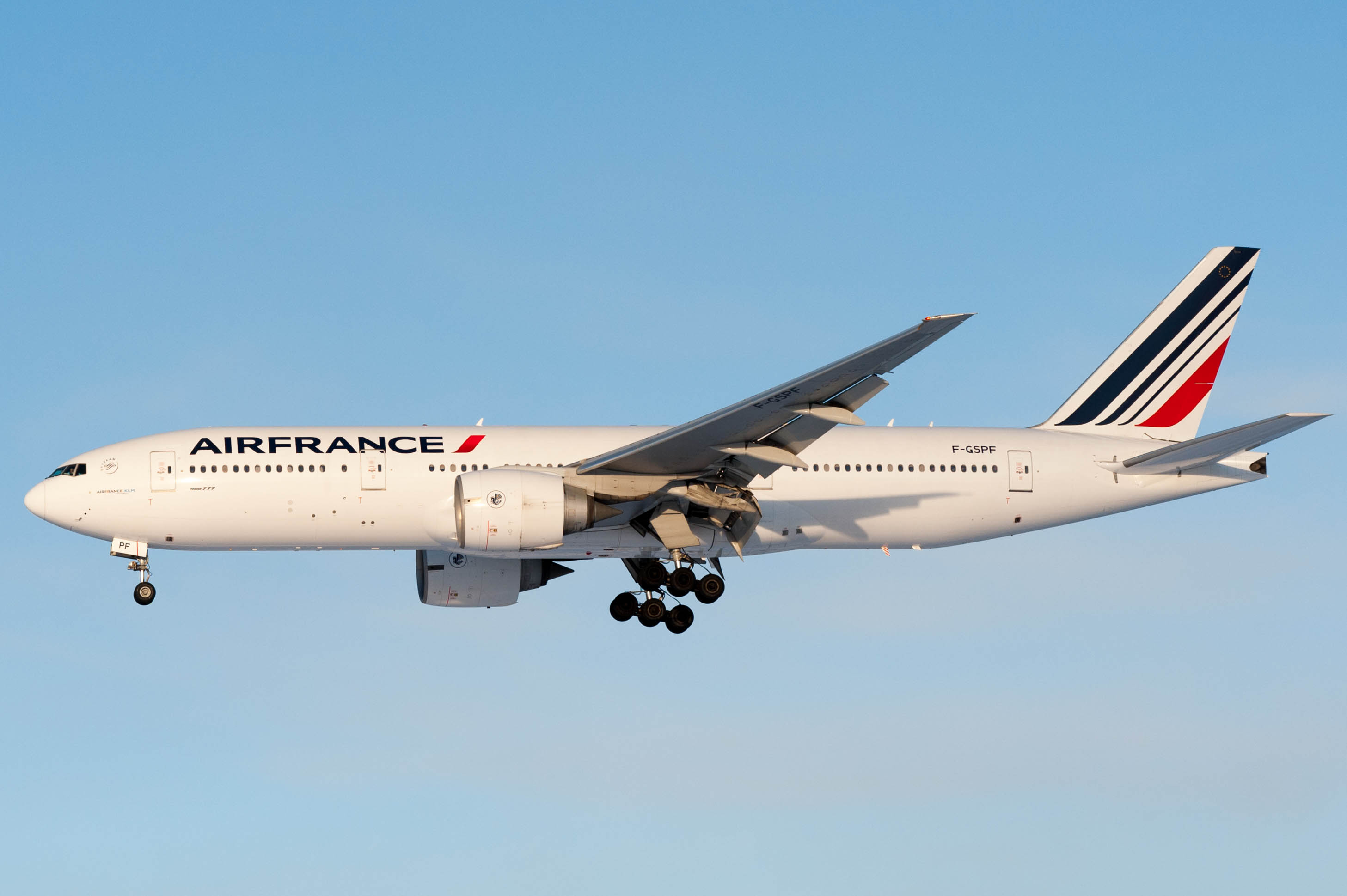
Boeing 777-200ER

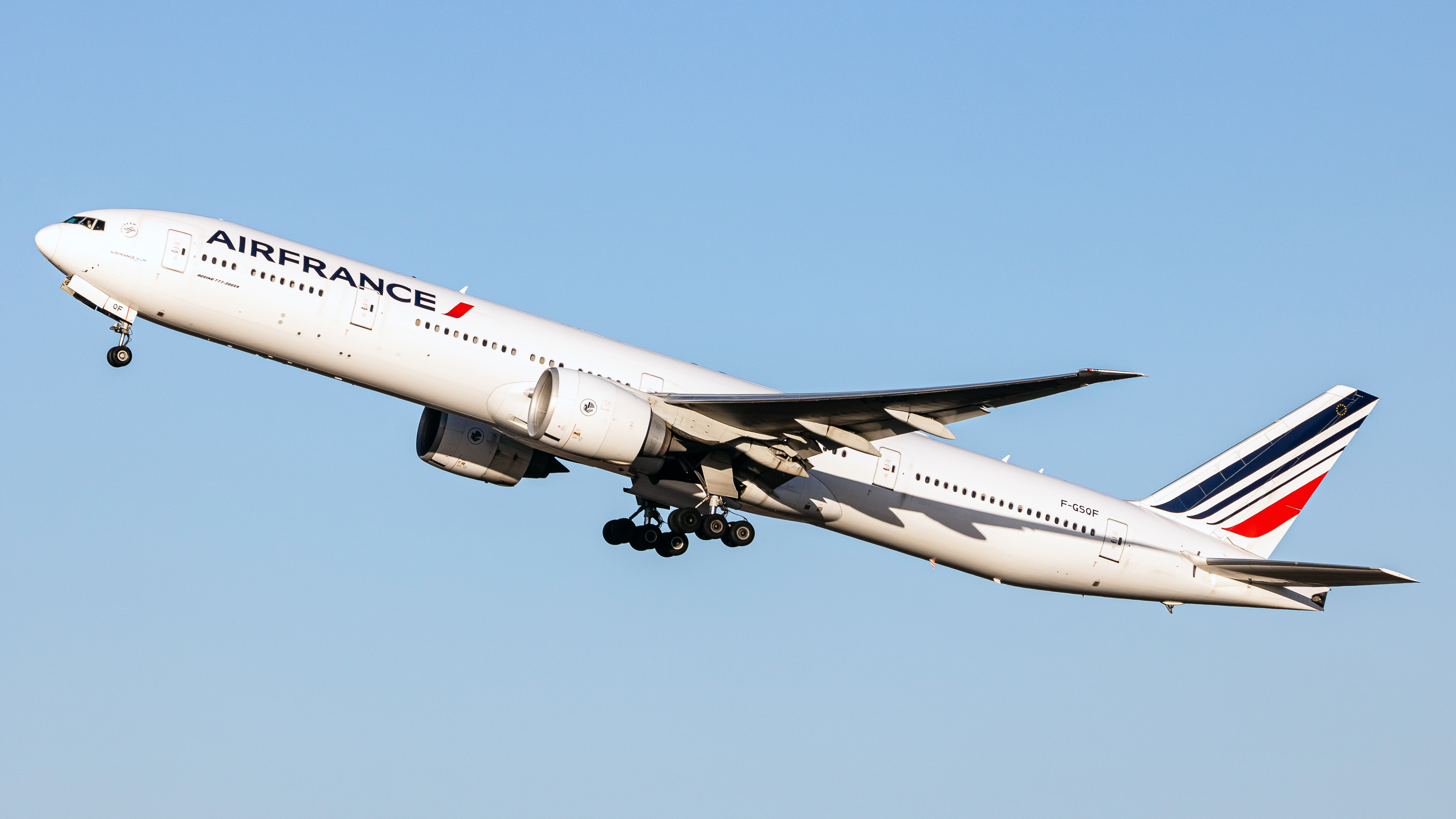
Boeing 777-300ER

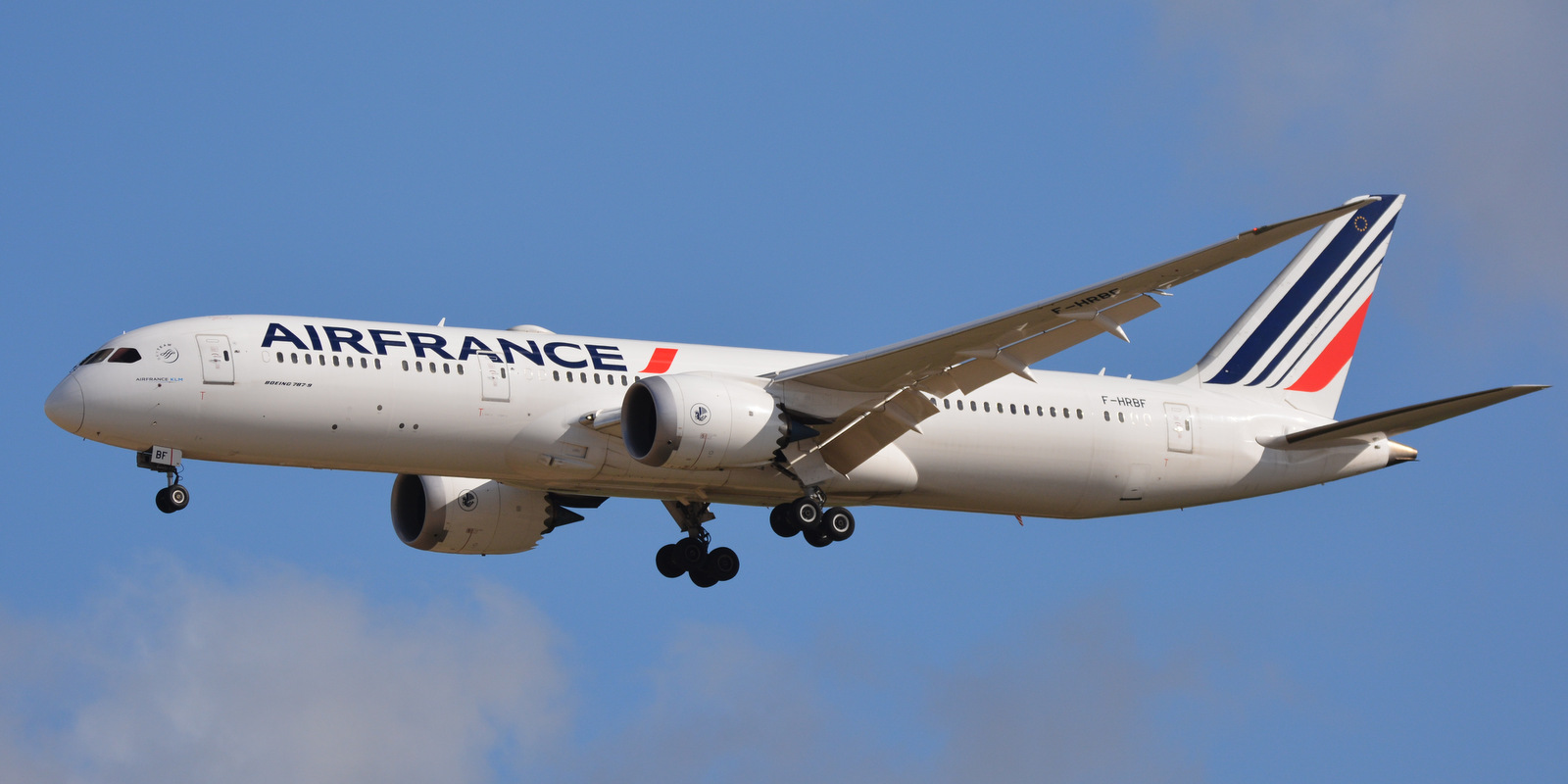
Boeing 787-9

== Fleet history ==
Previously, Air France operated the following aircraft types:

Air France historical fleet
Aircraft	Total	Introduced	Retired	Replacement	Notes	Refs
Aérospatiale/BAC Concorde	7	1976	2003	None	One crashed as flight AF4590.	
Airbus A300B2-100	11	1974	1996	Airbus A330-200	One hijacked and written-off as flight AF8969.	
Airbus A300B4-200	14	1976	1998	Airbus A330-200	One was hijacked in 1976 as flight AF139.	
Airbus A310-200	7	1984	2002	Airbus A330-200		
Airbus A310-300	4	1989	2002	Airbus A330-200		
Airbus A320-100	14	1988	2010	Airbus A320-200	One crashed as flight AF296Q.	
Airbus A340-200	6	1993	1999	Boeing 777-200ER		
Airbus A340-300	24	1993	2020	Airbus A350-900	Launch customer. Retirement due to the COVID-19 pandemic. One crashed as flight AF358.	
Airbus A380-800	10	2009	2020	Airbus A350-900	Early retirement due to COVID-19 pandemic. 5 to be stored at Charles de Gaulle Airport in Paris with no plans to re-enter the fleet, and the other 5 to be scrapped.	
Boeing 707-320	21	1959	1979	Airbus A300	F-BHSH was irreparably damaged by a bomb explosion. Three crashed as flights AF272, AF007, and AF117.	
Boeing 707-320B	8	1960	1982	Airbus A300	One crashed as flight AF212 (1969).	
Boeing 707-320C	12	1960	1984	Airbus A310	One crashed as flight AF212 (1968).	
Boeing 727-200	29	1968	1992	Airbus A320-200		
Boeing 737-200	24	1973	2002	Airbus A320-200		
Boeing 737-300	9	1991	2003	Airbus A320-200		
Boeing 737-500	30	1990	2007	Airbus A320-200		
Boeing 747-100	18	1970	2000	Boeing 747-400		
Boeing 747-200B	2	1979	2004	Boeing 777-300ER		
Boeing 747-200F	11	1976	2010	Boeing 747-400ERF		
Boeing 747-200M	13	1977	2005	Boeing 777-300ER		
Boeing 747-200M/SUD	3	1990	2006	Boeing 777-300ER	Acquired from merged Union de Transports Aériens. Converted from two 747-200M aircraft.	
Boeing 747-300M	2	1991	2007	Boeing 777-300ER	Acquired from merged Union de Transports Aériens.	
Boeing 747-400	11	1991	2016	Airbus A380-800; Boeing 777-300ER	2 leased by Saudia.	
Boeing 747-400	4	1991	2016	Airbus A380-800; Boeing 777-300ER	Converted into freighters and transferred to Air France Cargo.	
Boeing 747-400BCF	4	2009	2011	Boeing 777F	Converted from 747-400 passenger aircraft.	
Boeing 747-400ERF	6	2002	2015	Boeing 777F		
Boeing 747-400M	3	1992	2012	Boeing 777-300ER		
Boeing 767-200ER	2	1991	1992	Airbus A330-200		
Boeing 767-300ER	7	1991	2003	Airbus A330-200		
Bréguet 763 Deux-Ponts	12	1952	1971	Unknown		
de Havilland Comet	3	1953	1954	Vickers Viscount 700		
Dewoitine D.338	Unknown	1936	1945(?)	Unknown		
Douglas DC-3	81	1946	1962	Unknown		
Douglas DC-4	45	1946	1971	Unknown		
Douglas DC-6	2	1949	1968	Unknown		
Fokker F27 Friendship	17	1967	1997	Unknown		
Fokker F28 Fellowship	6	1977	1995	Unknown	Leased from TAT European Airlines.	
Fokker 100	6	1997	1999	Unknown		
Junkers Ju 52/3m	Unknown	1945	1953	Unknown		
Latécoère 631	4	1947	Unknown	Unknown	Three aircraft were lost due to crashes, the F-BDRC and F-BDRD crashed in 1948, presumably due to material fatigue, and another was lost in 1950, so that Air France operated only one Latécoère 631 in the freight service until the early 1950s.	
Lockheed L-049 Constellation	4	1946	1950	Lockheed L-1049 Super Constellation		
Lockheed L-749 Constellation	24	1947	1961	Lockheed L-1049 Super Constellation		
Lockheed L-1049 Super Constellation	24	1953	1968	Lockheed L-1649A Starliner		
Lockheed L-1649A Starliner	8	1957	1963	Boeing 707		
Lockheed L-1011 TriStar	1	1989	1991	Unknown	Leased from Air Transat.	
McDonnell Douglas DC-10-30	5	1992	1995	Unknown	Acquired from Union des Transports Aériens (UTA).	
SNCASE SE.161 Languedoc	49	1945	1952	Unknown		
Sud-Ouest Bretagne	Unknown	Unknown	Unknown	Unknown		
Sud Aviation Caravelle	50	1959	1981	Boeing 727-200		
Transall C-160	4	1973	1991	Boeing 737-300QC	Operated for La Poste.	
Vickers Viscount 700	16	1953	1962	Unknown	Four Viscounts were leased from British Eagle.	

Air France also briefly operated Convair 990 and Douglas DC-8-61 jet aircraft.

=== Historical gallery ===
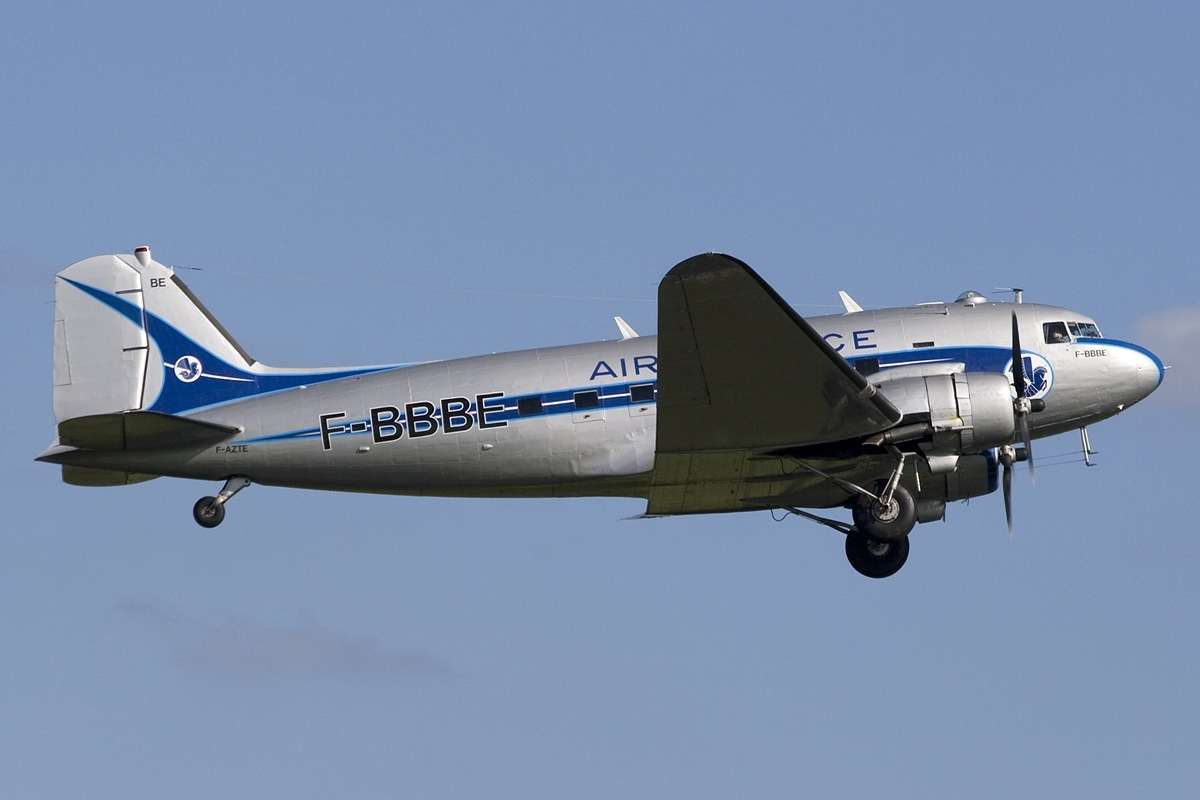
Douglas DC-3 in 2015 (preserved)

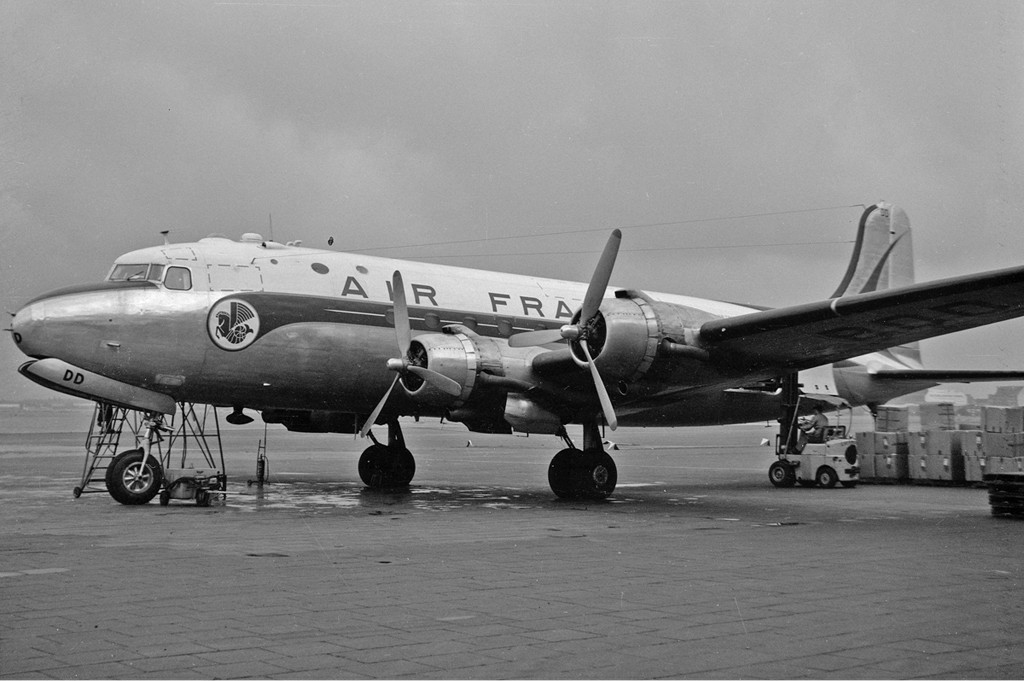
Douglas DC-4 in 1960

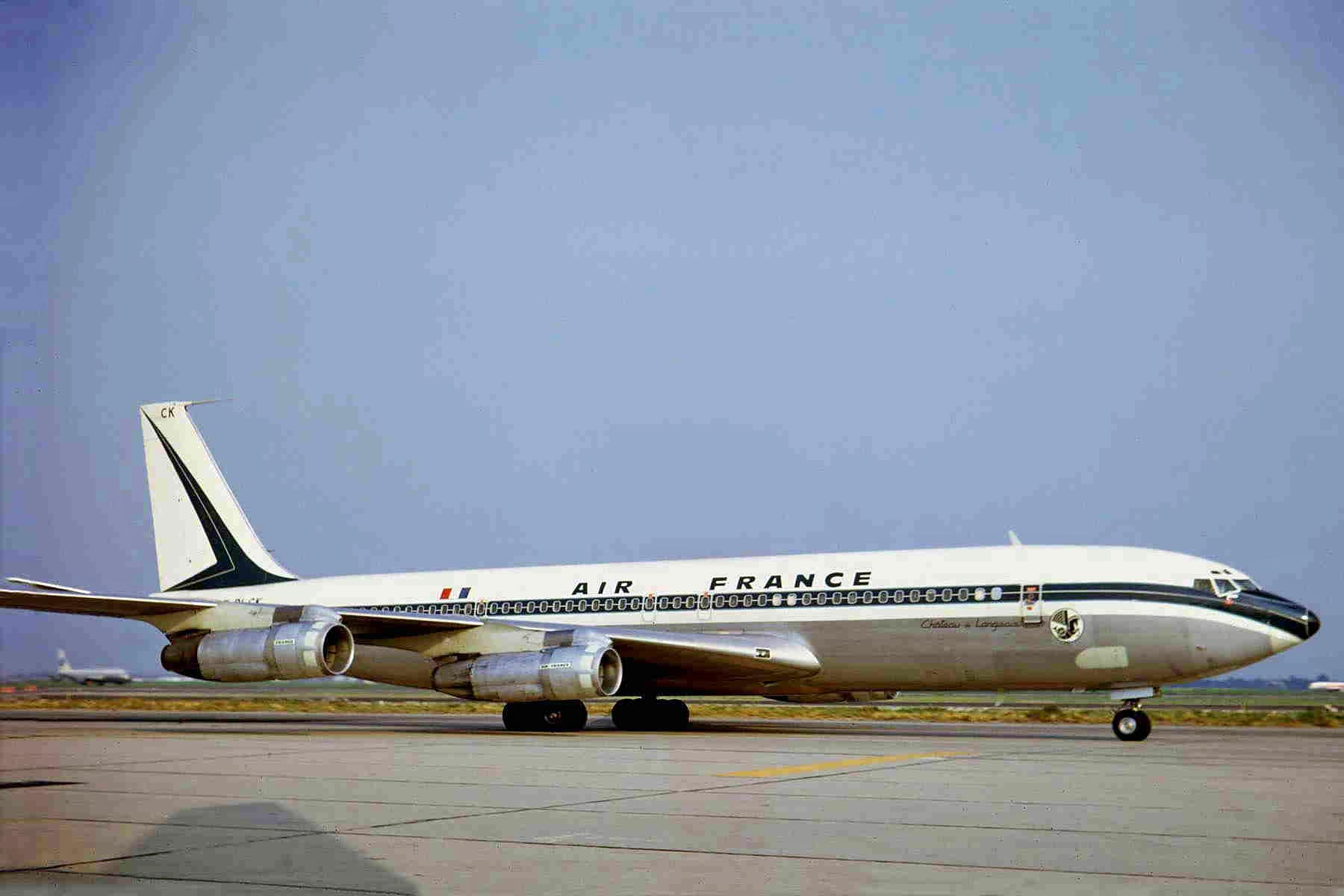
Boeing 707-300 in 1970

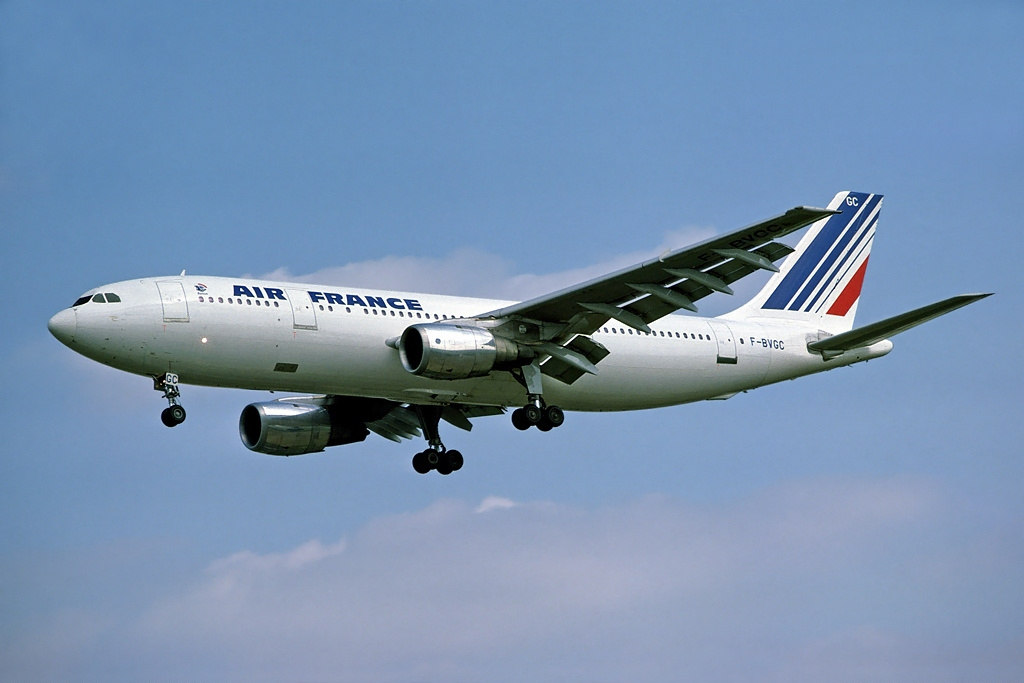
Airbus A300 in 1978

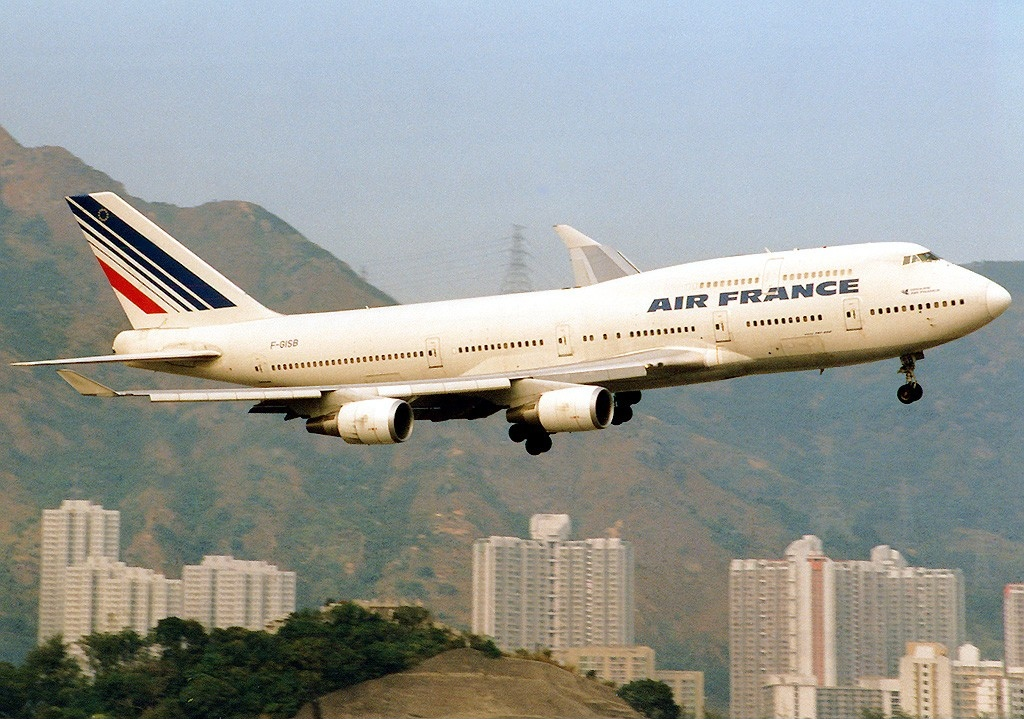
Boeing 747-400 in 1996

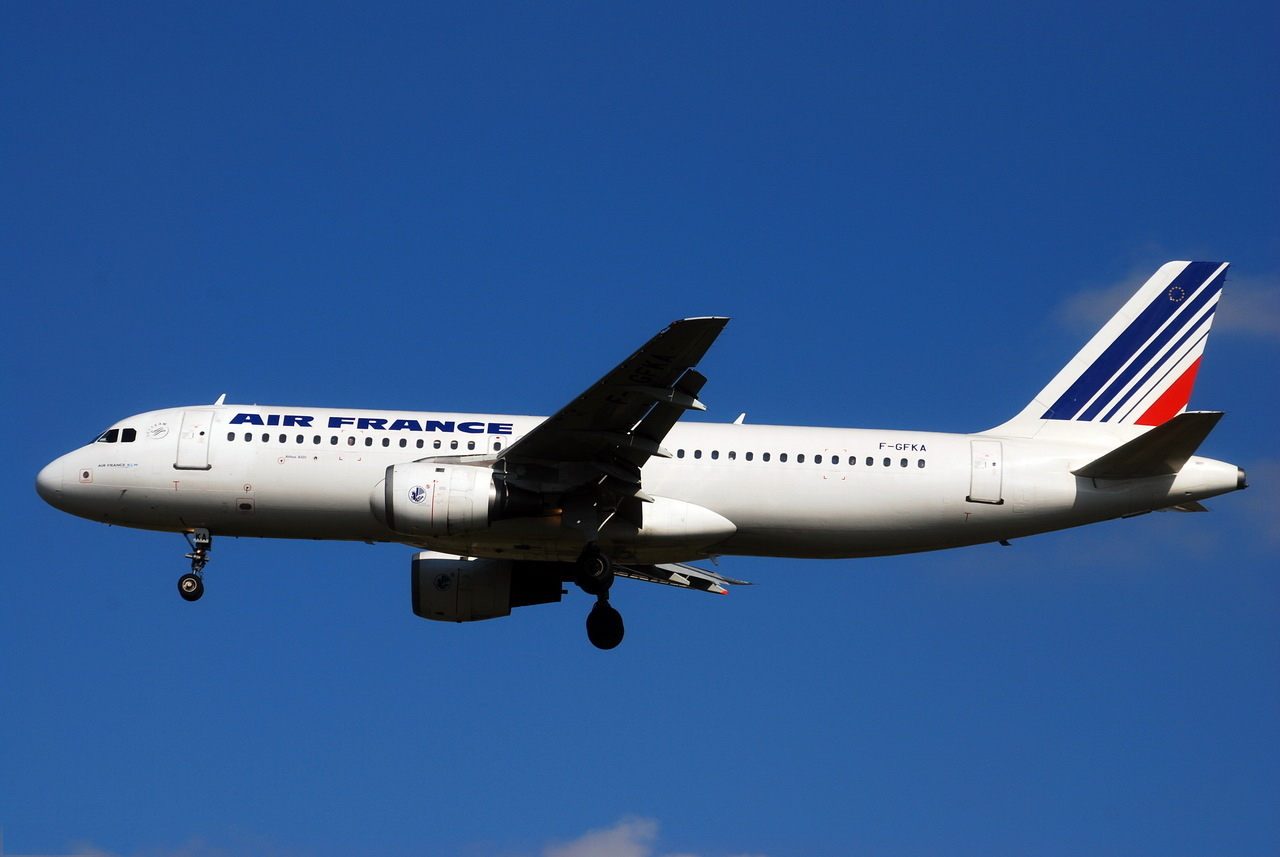
Airbus A320-100 in 2009

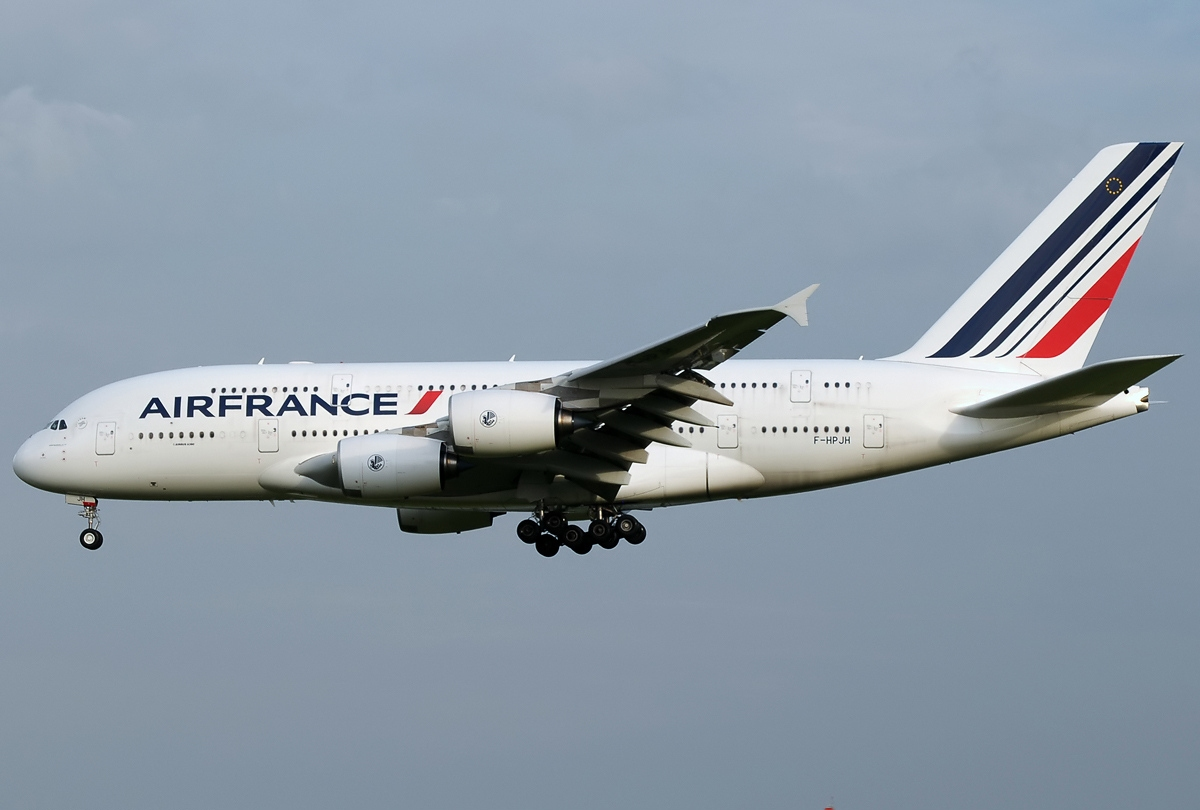
Airbus A380 in 2013

== See also ==
- British Airways fleet
- KLM fleet
- Lufthansa fleet
