= Flight 212 =

Flight 212 may refer to:

- Air France Flight 212 (1968), crashed on 6 March 1968
- Air France Flight 212 (1969), crashed on 3 December 1969
- Eastern Air Lines Flight 212, crashed on 11 September 1974
