= Air France Flight 212 =

Air France Flight 212 was a route used during the 1960s, originating in Quito, Ecuador, and flying to Paris, France via Caracas, Venezuela, Pointe-à-Pitre on the island of Grande-Terre in Guadeloupe, and Lisbon, Portugal. The route suffered crashes in two successive years, and therefore references to this route may refer to either of:

- Air France Flight 212 (1968), crashed on 6 March 1968
- Air France Flight 212 (1969), crashed on 3 December 1969
