= Lufthansa fleet =

List of aircraft operated by Lufthansa

Lufthansa operates a mainline fleet consisting of Airbus narrow and wide-body and Boeing wide-body aircraft. The mainline fleet is composed of seven different aircraft families: the Airbus A320 and A320neo families, Airbus A330, Airbus A340, Airbus A350, Airbus A380, Boeing 747 and Boeing 787. This list excludes Lufthansa brand subsidiaries Lufthansa City Airlines and Lufthansa Cargo.

Additionally, Lufthansa currently has orders placed for further new Airbus A350, Boeing 787, and Boeing 777X series aircraft. Up until 2027, these deliveries will replace all A340 series aircraft alongside the remaining Boeing 747-400s, and allow for two Airbus A330s to be transferred to Brussels Airlines, five Airbus A330s and four Airbus A350s to be transferred to Discover Airlines, and five Boeing 787s to be transferred to Austrian Airlines.

== Current fleet ==
As of July 2026, Lufthansa operates the following mainline aircraft:

Lufthansa mainline fleet
Aircraft	In service		Orders	Passengers						Notes
Aircraft	In service		Orders	F	C	W	Y	Total	Refs	Notes
Airbus A319-100	22		—	—	var.	—	var.	138		
Airbus A320-200	44		—	—	var.	—	var.	168		
Airbus A320neo	26		22	—	var.	—	var.	180		Worldwide launch customer. Some aircraft on order allocated to group subsidiaries.
Airbus A321-100	15		—	—	var.	—	var.	200		Launch customer.
Airbus A321-200	37		—	—	var.	—	var.	200		
Airbus A321neo	20		14	—	var.	—	var.	215		Some aircraft on order allocated to group subsidiaries.
Airbus A330-300	6		—	—	42	28	185	255		To be retired and transferred within the group in 2026 (5 to Discover Airlines)
Airbus A340-300	12		—	—	30	28	221	279		To be retired by 2028.
Airbus A350-900	31	10	31	4	38	24	201	267		
Airbus A350-900	31	17	31	—	48	21	224	293		To be retrofitted with Allegris interior.
Airbus A350-900	31	4	31	—	30	26	262	318		4 former Philippine Airlines aircraft. To be transferred to Discover Airlines by 2027.
Airbus A350-1000	—		15	4	49	35	212	300		Order with 25 options. Deliveries from 2026 to replace the retired Airbus A340-600.
Airbus A380-800	8		—	8	78	52	371	509		6 of formerly 14 A380s have been sold back to Airbus. To be retrofitted with new business class cabins.
Boeing 747-400	8		—	—	67	32	272	371		To be retired by 2028 and replaced by Boeing 777-9.
Boeing 747-8I	17		—	8	80	32	244	364		To be retrofitted with Allegris interior. 2 airframes were sold to the United States Air Force for the VC-25B program.
Boeing 777-9	—		20	TBA						20 Boeing 777-9s on order. Deliveries delayed, entry into service not before 2027. To replace Boeing 747-400 and Airbus A340-300
Boeing 787-9	20	16	22	—	28	28	231	287		To be delivered with Allegris interior from 2025.
Boeing 787-9	20	4	—	—	26	21	247	294		Five taken over from a Hainan Airlines order, retaining their original interior configuration. To be transferred to Austrian Airlines.
Total	266		124							

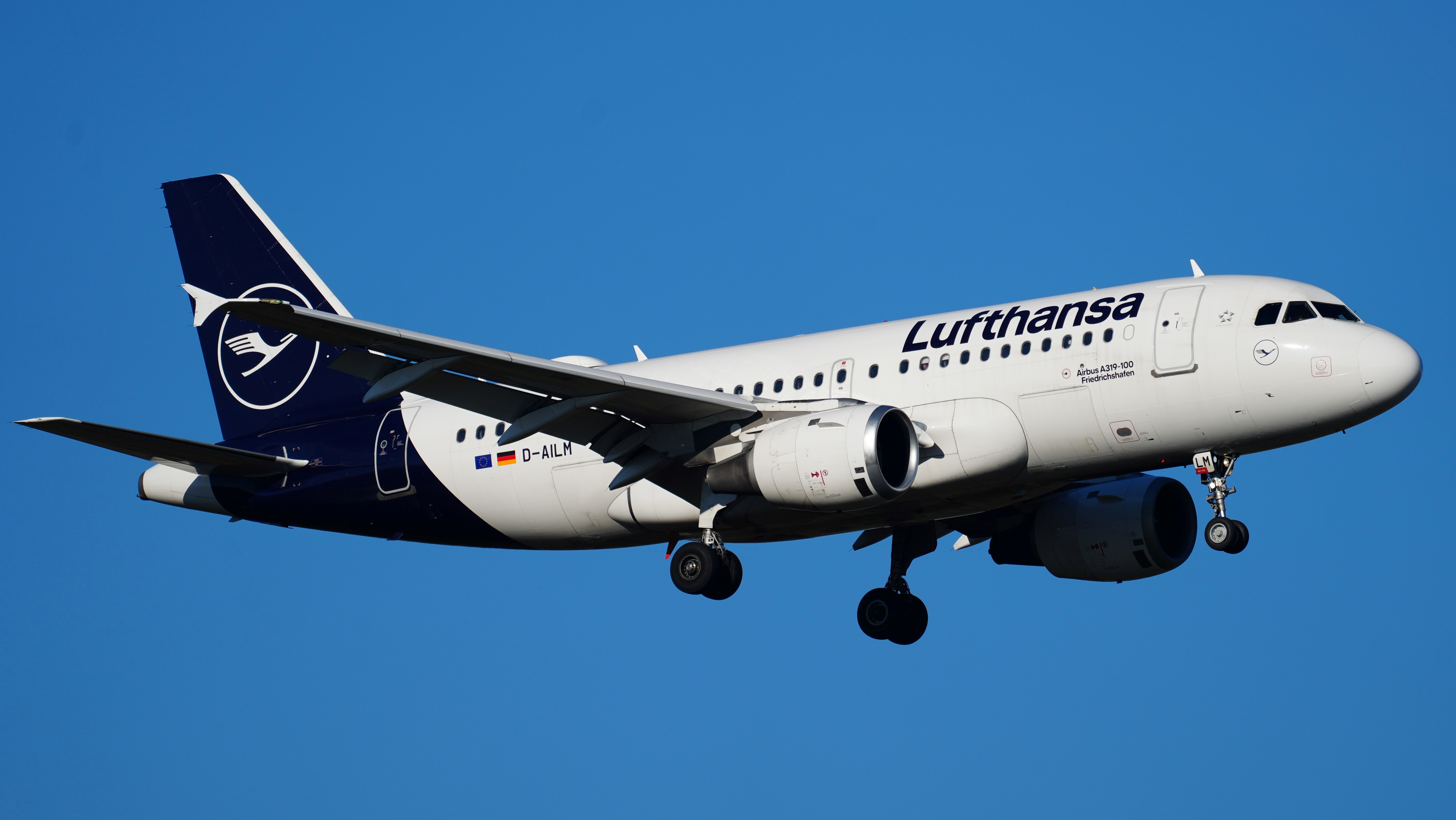
Airbus A319-100

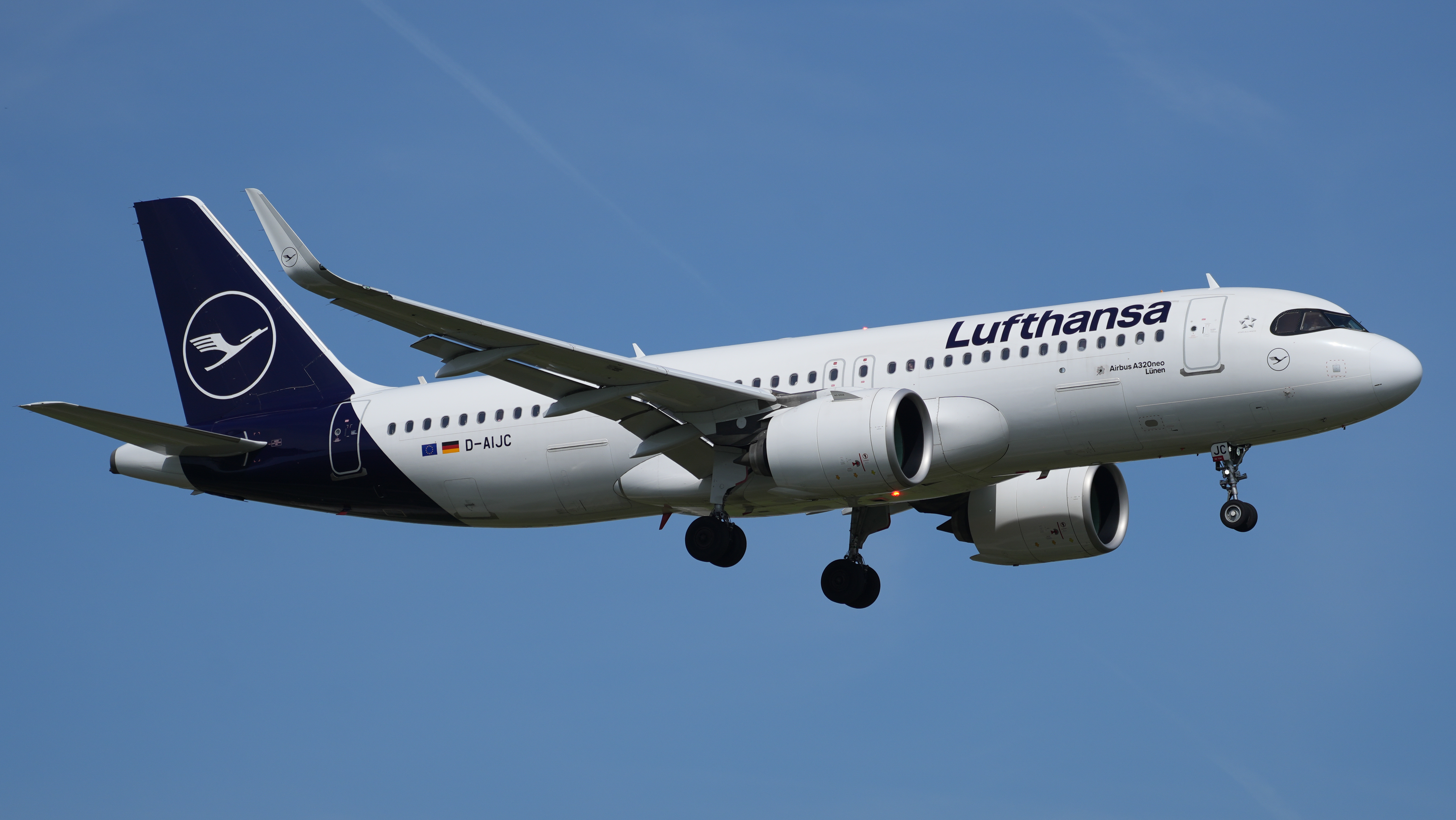
Airbus A320neo

Airbus A321neo

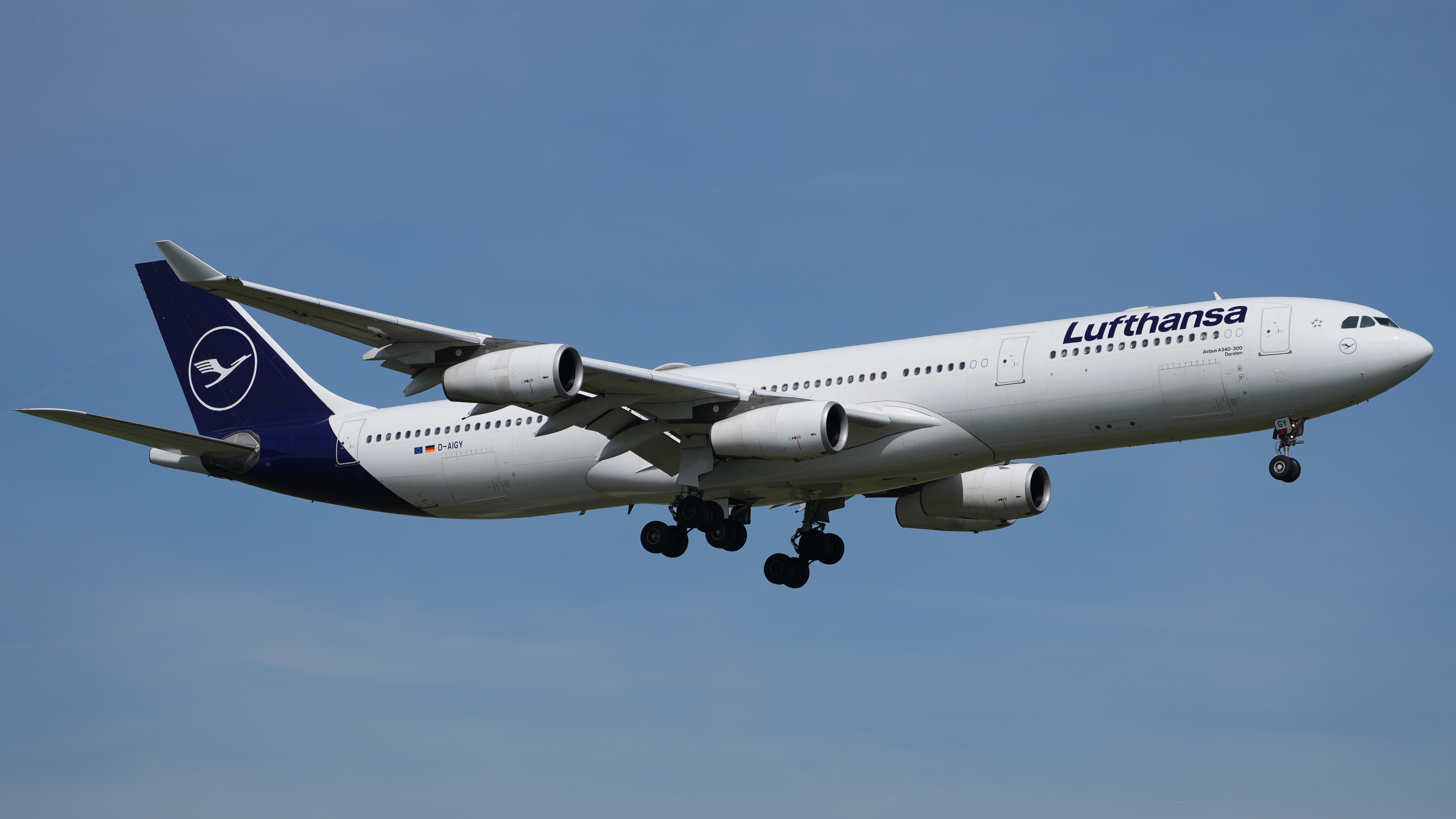
Airbus A340-300

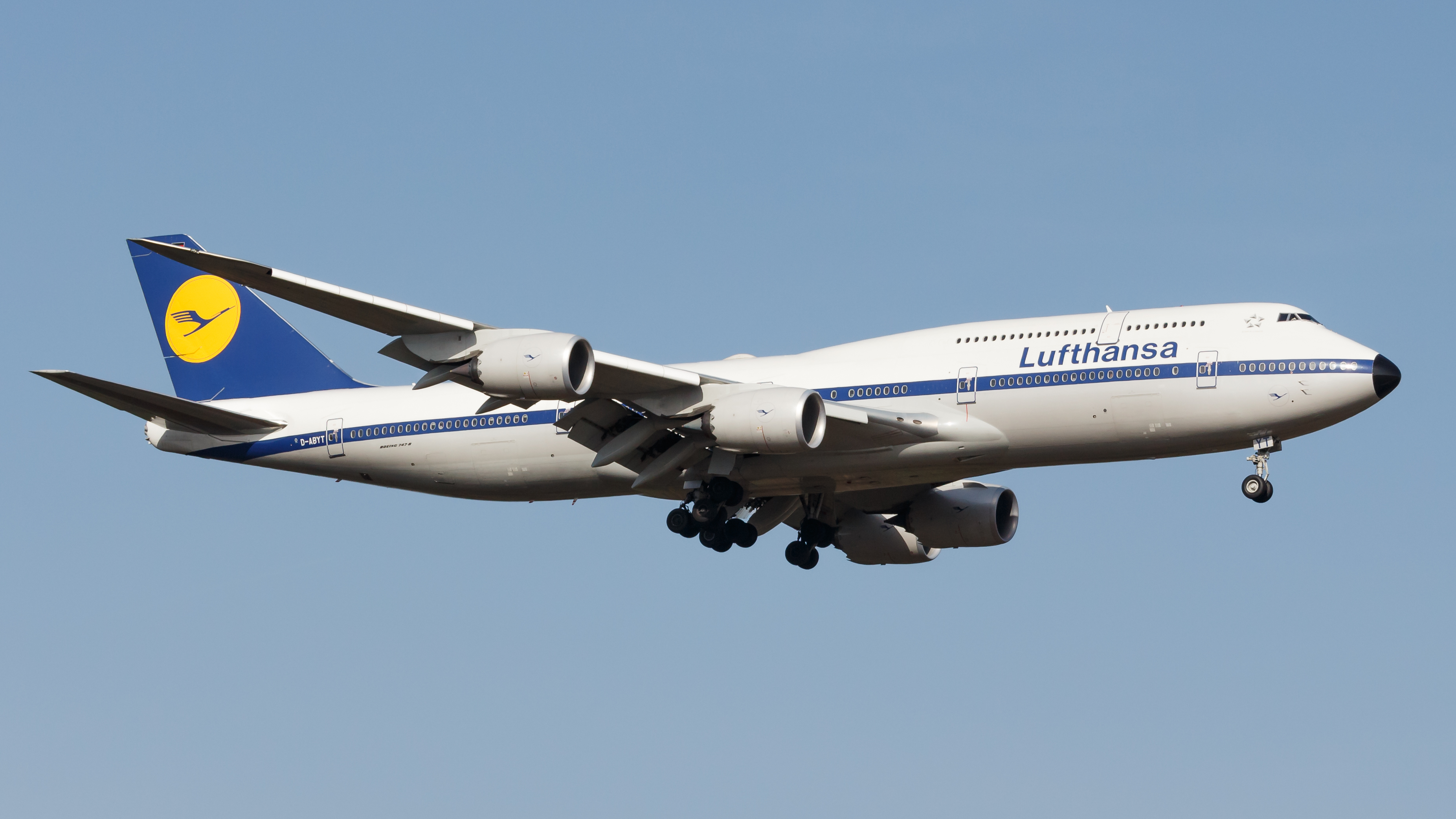
Boeing 747-8I
in 1970s retro livery

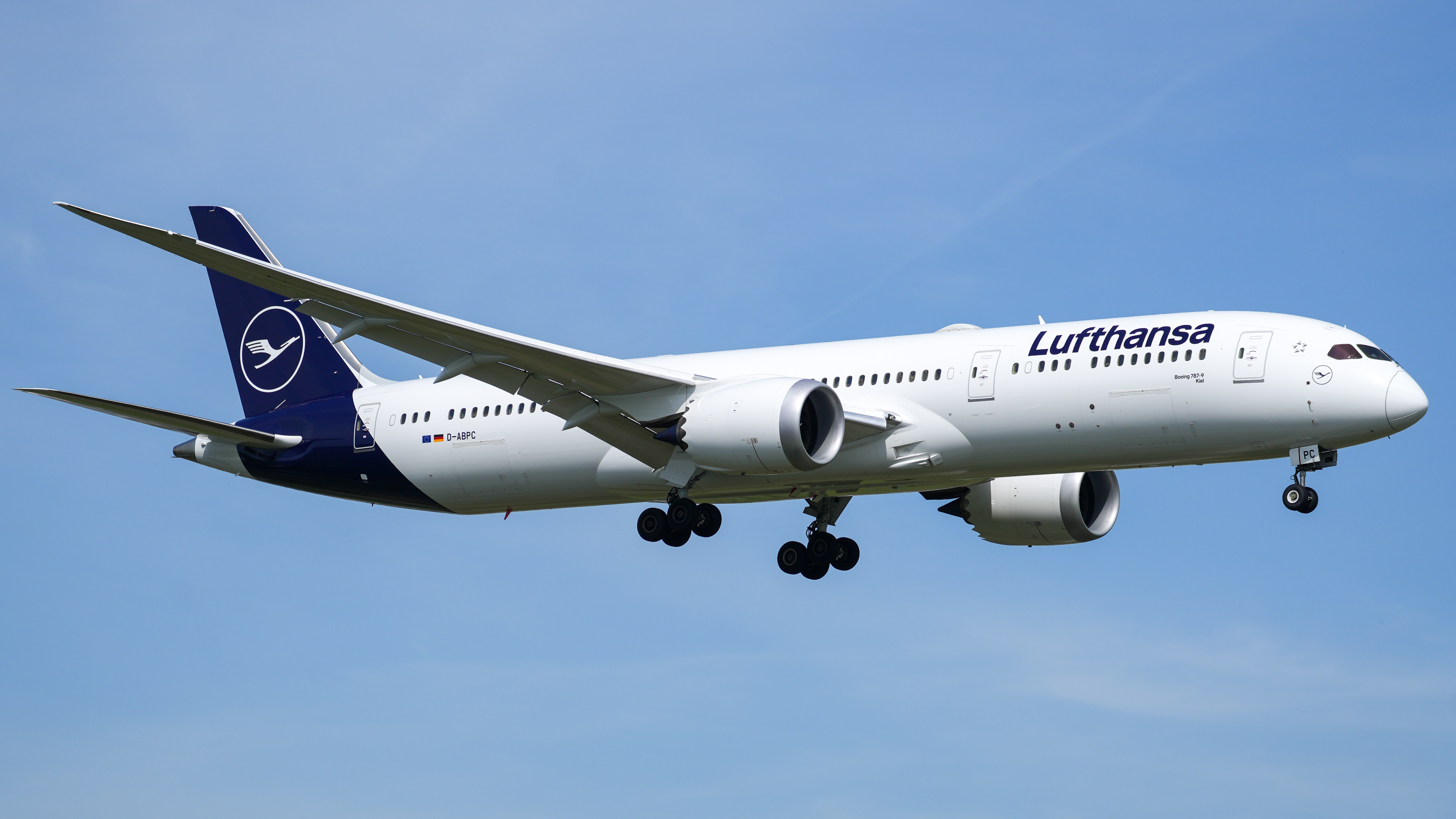
Boeing 787-9

Airbus A380-800

== Historical fleet ==
Over the years, Lufthansa had operated a variety of aircraft since 1955, including:

Lufthansa mainline historical fleet
Aircraft	Total	Introduced	Retired	Notes
Airbus A300B2-1C	6	1976	1984	
Airbus A300B4-2C	7	1977	1987	
Airbus A300-600R	15	1987	2009	
Airbus A310-200	13	1983	1995	
Airbus A310-300	12	1988	2005	
Airbus A330-200	5	2002	2006	
Airbus A340-200	8	1993	2003	Worldwide A340 launch customer alongside Air France.
Airbus A340-600	24	2003	2026	Replaced by Airbus A350-1000.
Boeing 707-320B	18	1960	1984	Also used in cargo configuration. One crashed as flight LH527.
Boeing 707-320C	18	1960	1984	Also used in cargo configuration. One crashed as flight LH527.
Boeing 707-420	5	1960	1977	
Boeing 727-100	27	1964	1979	Also used in Quick Change version for cargo operations.
Boeing 727-200	30	1971	1993	
Boeing 737-100	22	1968	1982	Launch Customer of the Boeing 737-100.
Boeing 737-200	47	1969	1998	Also used in Quick Change version for cargo operations.
Boeing 737-300	46	1986	2016	Also used in Quick Change version for cargo operations.
Boeing 737-400	7	1992	1998	
Boeing 737-500	33	1990	2016	
McDonnell Douglas DC-10-30	12	1974	1994	
Boeing 747-130	3	1970	1978	One crashed in 1974 as Flight LH540.
Boeing 747-200M	14	1976	2004	One displayed at Technik Museum Speyer.
Junkers Ju-52	231	1932	1945	Launch Customer of the Junkers Ju-52.
Boeing 767-300ER	1	1994	1995	Leased from Condor.

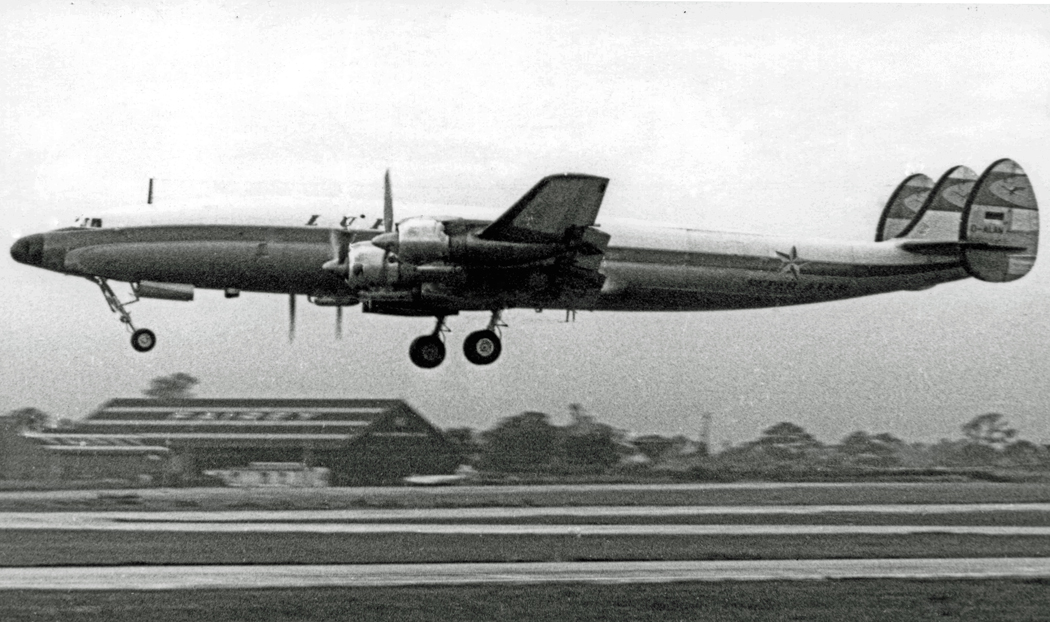
Lockheed L-1649A Starliner (1961)

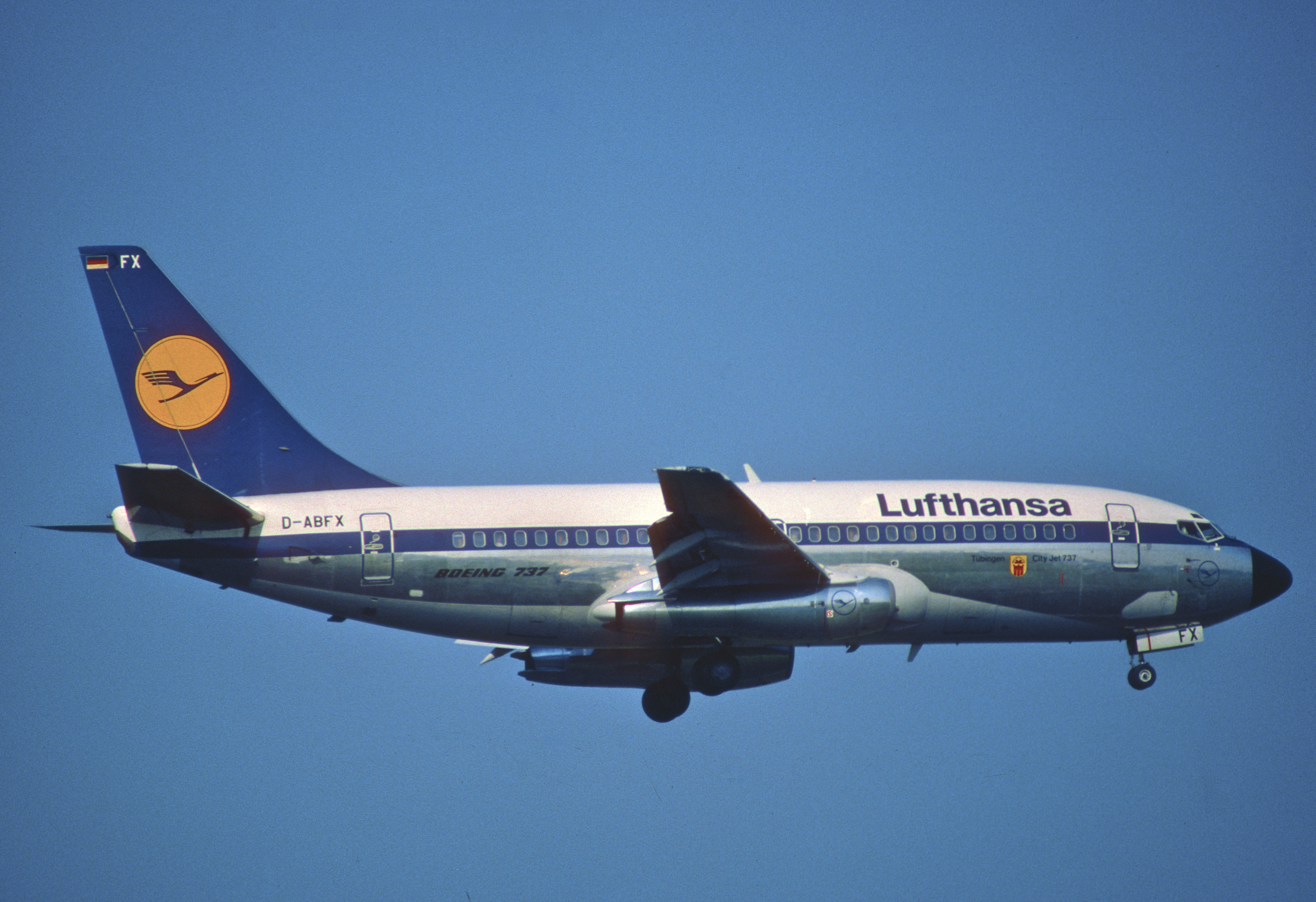
Boeing 737-200 (1985)

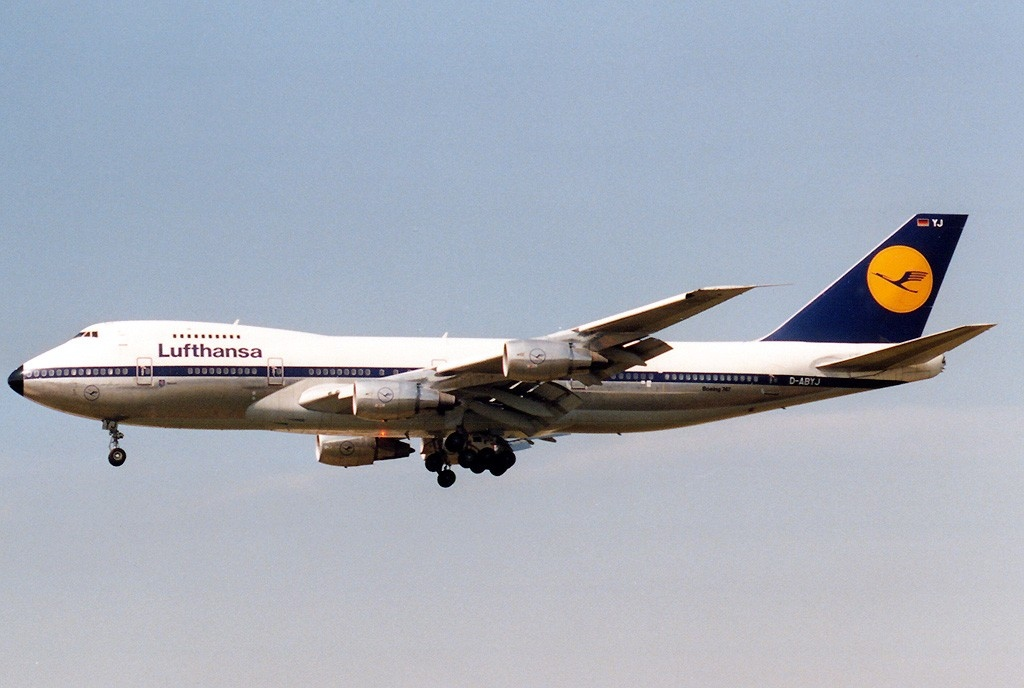
Boeing 747-200 (1989)

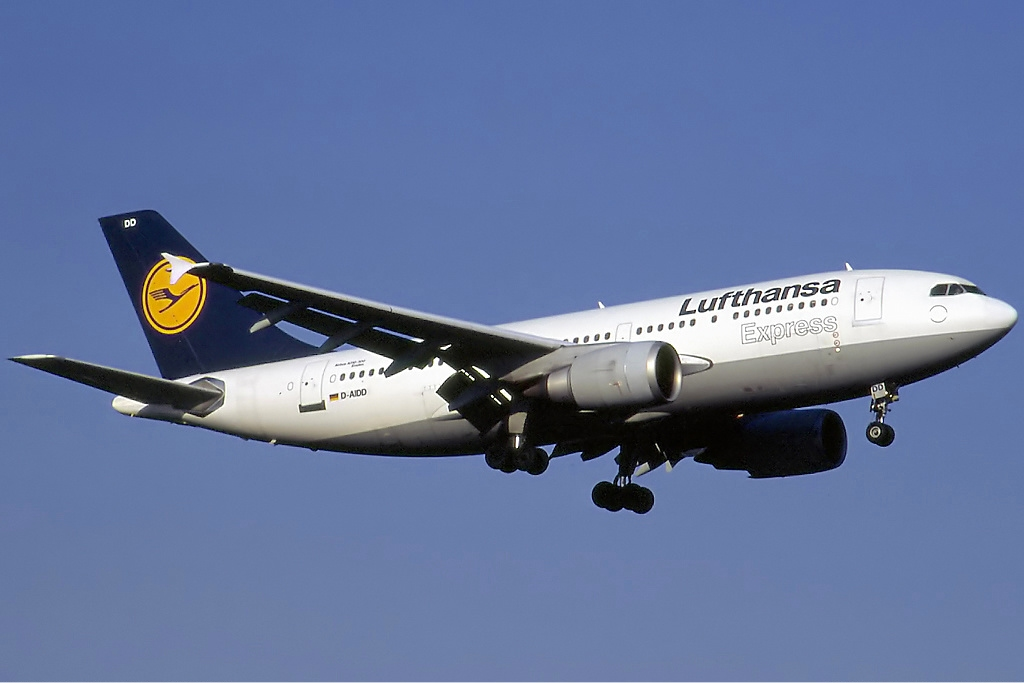
Airbus A310-300 with short-lived Lufthansa Express branding (1994)

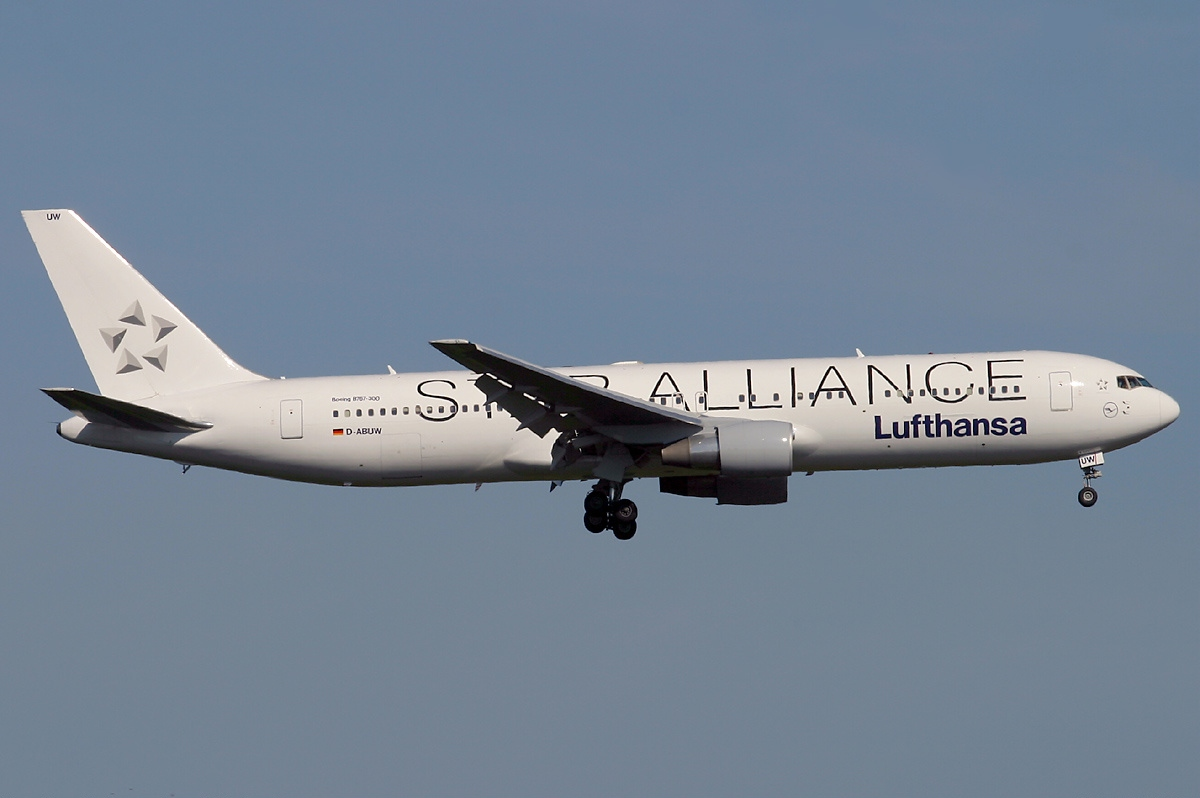
Boeing 767-300ER leased from Lauda Air, wearing Star Alliance titles (2003)

== See also ==
- Air France fleet
- British Airways fleet
- KLM fleet
