= Air France Flight 212 (1968) =

Fatal aviation accident in Guadeloupe

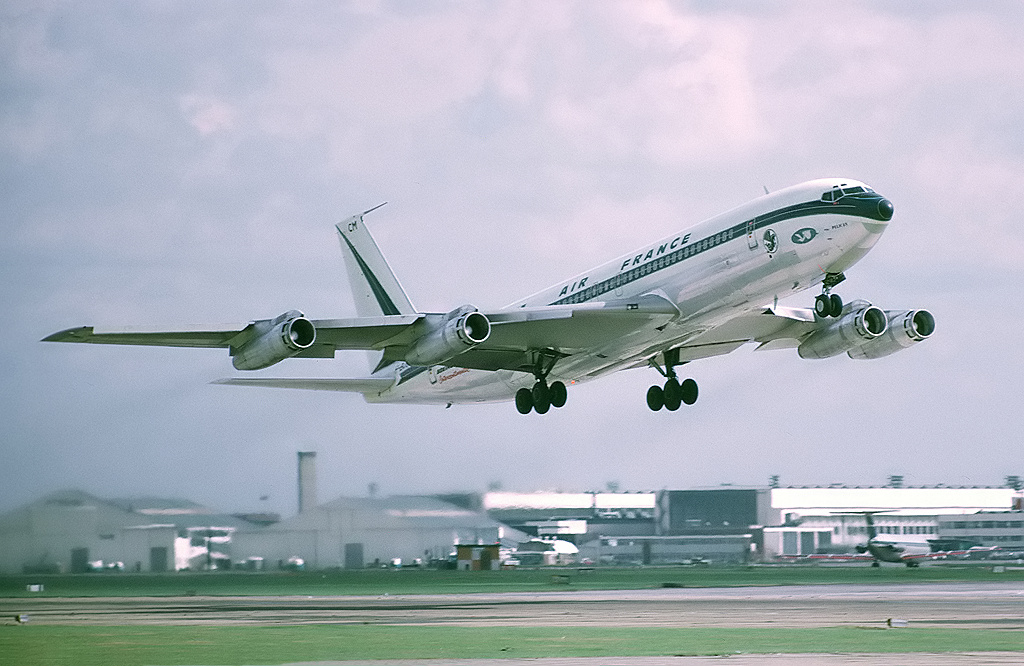
- A similar Air France Boeing 707-320C

Accident
- Date: 5 March 1968
- Summary: Controlled flight into terrain
- Site: La Grande Soufrière, Guadeloupe; 16.0°N 61.7°W

Aircraft
- Aircraft type: Boeing 707-328C
- Aircraft name: Château de Lavoûte-Polignac
- Operator: Air France
- IATA flight No.: AF212
- ICAO flight No.: AFR212
- Call sign: AIRFRANS 212
- Registration: F-BLCJ
- Flight origin: Arturo Merino Benítez International Airport, Santiago, Chile
- 1st stopover: Jorge Chávez International Airport, Lima, Peru
- 2nd stopover: Mariscal Sucre International Airport, Quito, Ecuador
- 3rd stopover: El Dorado International Airport, Bogotá, Colombia
- 4th stopover: Simón Bolívar International Airport, Caracas, Venezuela
- 5th stopover: Pointe-à-Pitre International Airport, Pointe-à-Pitre, Guadeloupe
- 6th stopover: Santa Maria Airport, Santa Maria, Azores
- Last stopover: Lisbon Airport, Lisbon, Portugal
- Destination: Orly Airport, Paris, France
- Occupants: 63
- Passengers: 52
- Crew: 11
- Fatalities: 63
- Survivors: 0

Air France Flight 212 was a scheduled passenger flight from Santiago, Chile to Paris with scheduled stops at Lima, Quito, Bogotá, Caracas, Pointe-à-Pitre, Vila do Porto, and Lisbon. On March 6, 1968, the Boeing 707 operating the flight, named "Chateau de Lavoute Polignac", crashed while approaching Le Raizet Airport in Pointe-à-Pitre, Guadeloupe, killing all 63 occupants of the plane.

== Accident ==
After air traffic control cleared the flight deck crew for a visual approach to Le Raizet Airport’s runway 11, the crew reported having the airfield in sight. Flight 212 began its descent from flight level 090 (approximately 9,000 feet / 2,700 m) and passed over Saint-Claude, Guadeloupe, at about 4,400 feet (1,300 m).

Continuing on a northwesterly course, the aircraft struck Grande Découverte mountain at an altitude of 3,937 feet (1,200 m), 27.5 kilometres (17.1 mi) south-southwest of Le Raizet Airport and roughly 5 kilometres (3.1 mi) from the main peak of La Grande Soufrière. The crash site lies uphill from Saint-Claude and near the Matouba hot springs.

== Investigation ==
Accident investigators determined that the probable cause was the initiation of a nighttime visual approach from an incorrectly identified point.

== Aircraft ==
The aircraft had flown for 33 hours since coming off the Boeing production line, and was on its second revenue service (its maiden passenger flight was the previous day's outbound journey from Paris).

== Other accidents ==
The accident came six years after Air France Flight 117, another Boeing 707, crashed into a mountain further north on the same island while on approach to Point-à-Pitre's Le Raizet airport. Less than two years later, on 3 December 1969, Air France suffered another crash on the same leg of Flight 212 when the aircraft crashed shortly after take-off from Caracas.
