= Air France Flight 212 (1969) =

1969 aviation accident

Coordinates: 10.6000°N 66.9500°W

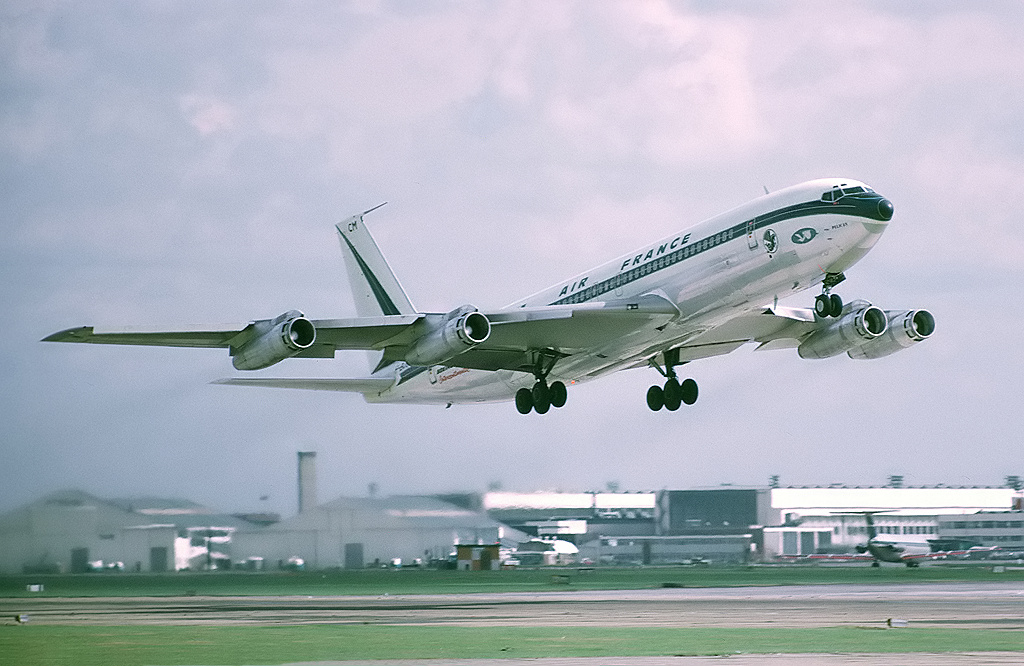
- A similar Air France Boeing 707-320C

Occurrence
- Date: December 3, 1969
- Summary: Unknown
- Site: Near Caracas, Venezuela

Aircraft
- Aircraft type: Boeing 707-328B
- Aircraft name: Chateau de Kerjean
- Operator: Air France
- Registration: F-BHSZ
- Flight origin: Caracas International Airport
- Destination: Pointe-à-Pitre International Airport
- Occupants: 62
- Passengers: 51
- Crew: 11
- Fatalities: 62
- Survivors: 0

Air France Flight 212 was a scheduled passenger flight from Santiago International Airport, was flying to Paris, France via Lima, Peru; Guayaquil, Ecuador; Bogota, Colombia; Caracas, Venezuela; Pointe-à-Pitre, Guadeloupe; and Lisbon, Portugal operated by a Boeing 707, registration F-BHSZ, that crashed on 3 December 1969. All 62 people on board were killed.

== Circumstances ==
On 3 December 1969, Flight 212, which originated from Santiago International Airport, was flying to Paris, France via Lima, Peru; Guayaquil, Ecuador; Bogota, Colombia; Caracas, Venezuela; Pointe-à-Pitre, Guadeloupe; and Lisbon, Portugal. The aircraft took off on the Caracas – Pointe-à-Pitre leg from Caracas airport's runway 08R at 19:02 local time (23:02 UTC). One minute after takeoff from Caracas, at approximately 3,000 feet (910 m), (Note: Some early newspaper reports incorrectly stated the altitude as 33,000 feet (10,000 m)) the aircraft plunged into the sea and sank in 160 feet of water.

The causes of the disaster remain unknown because the French Bureau of Investigations et Accidents (BEA) did not publish an investigation report. Documents relating to the BEA investigation are classified in the French national archives as 19880360/49 and 19880360/50, and will not be released until 2029, sixty years after the accident. However, in July 2017, several pilot unions (ALTER, SNGAF, SNOMAC, SNPL Air France ALPA, SNPNC, SPAF, UNAC, PNC UNSA) requested the files be declassified early.

Various conspiracy theories about the crash have arisen: maneuvers to avoid colliding with a nearby Avro 748 followed by a loss of control, bombing, spatial disorientation, in-flight-fire, engine failure, and/or fuel contamination. Documents classified "defense secret" from the BEA and the Paris Police Prefecture would investigate the probability of a bomb-related explosion on board the aircraft.

== Victims ==
All 62 people on board were killed, including:

- 11 crew members (4 flight crew + 7 flight attendants);
- 51 passengers, including 10 crew members deadheading (4 flight crew + 6 flight attendants).

== Sources ==
- "ASN Aircraft Accident Boeing 707-328B F-BHSZ Caracas Simon Bolivar Airport (CCS)". Aviation Safety Network.
- World Airline Accident Summary. Civil Aviation Authority (United Kingdom). 1974. ISBN 0-903083-44-2.
- "62 Dies as Jet Falls 6 Miles into Ocean: Air France Craft Lost at Caracas", Youngstown Vindicator, vol. 81, no. 95, Associated Press, p. 1, 4 December 1969
