= December 1969 =

Month of 1969

<<	December 1969					>>
Su	Mo	Tu	We	Th	Fr	Sa
	1	2	3	4	5	6
7	8	9	10	11	12	13
14	15	16	17	18	19	20
21	22	23	24	25	26	27
28	29	30	31

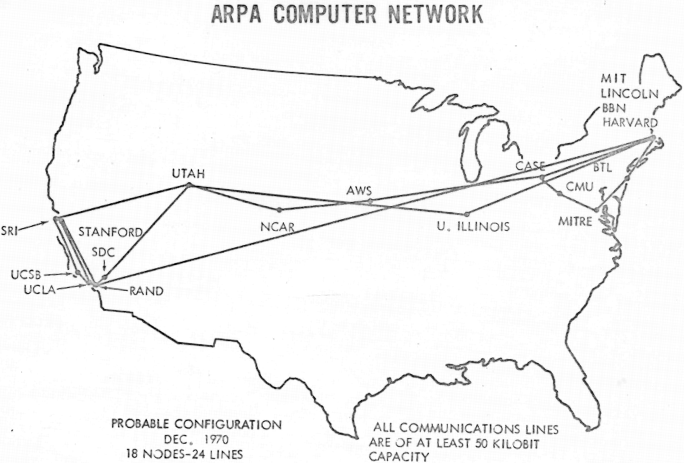
December 5, 1969: ARPANET, forerunner of the Internet, begins full operation linking computers at UCLA, UC-Santa Barbara, Stanford and University of Utah

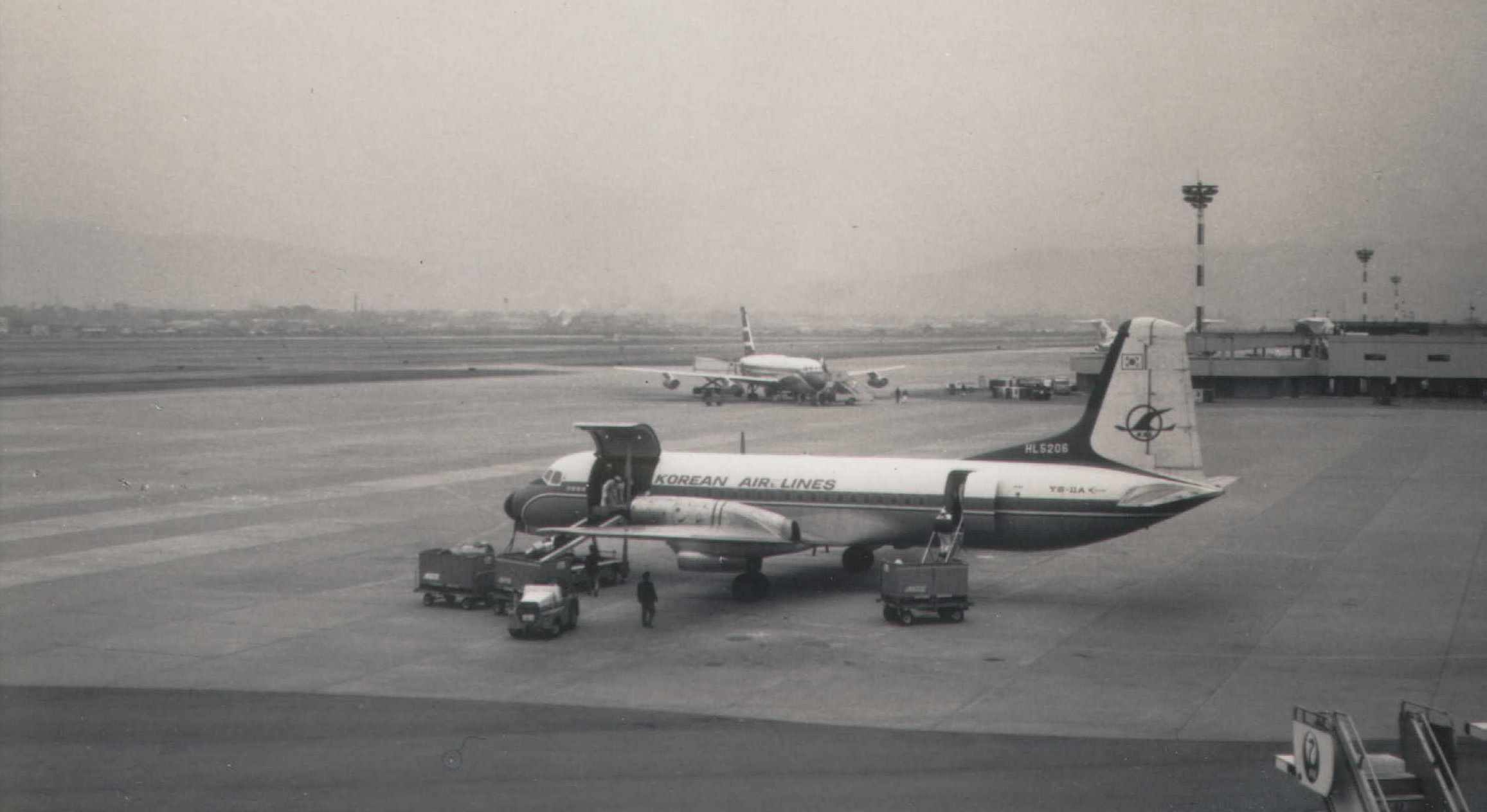
December 11, 1969: North Korea hijacks South Korean airliner, keeps 11 hostages for life

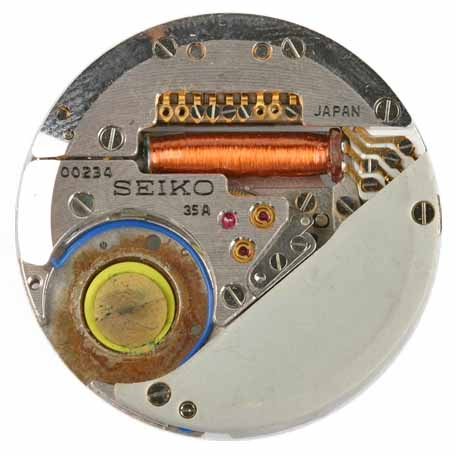
December 25, 1969: The quartz wristwatch era begins with Seiko's introduction of the Astron 35SQ

The following events occurred in December 1969:

== December 1, 1969 (Monday) ==
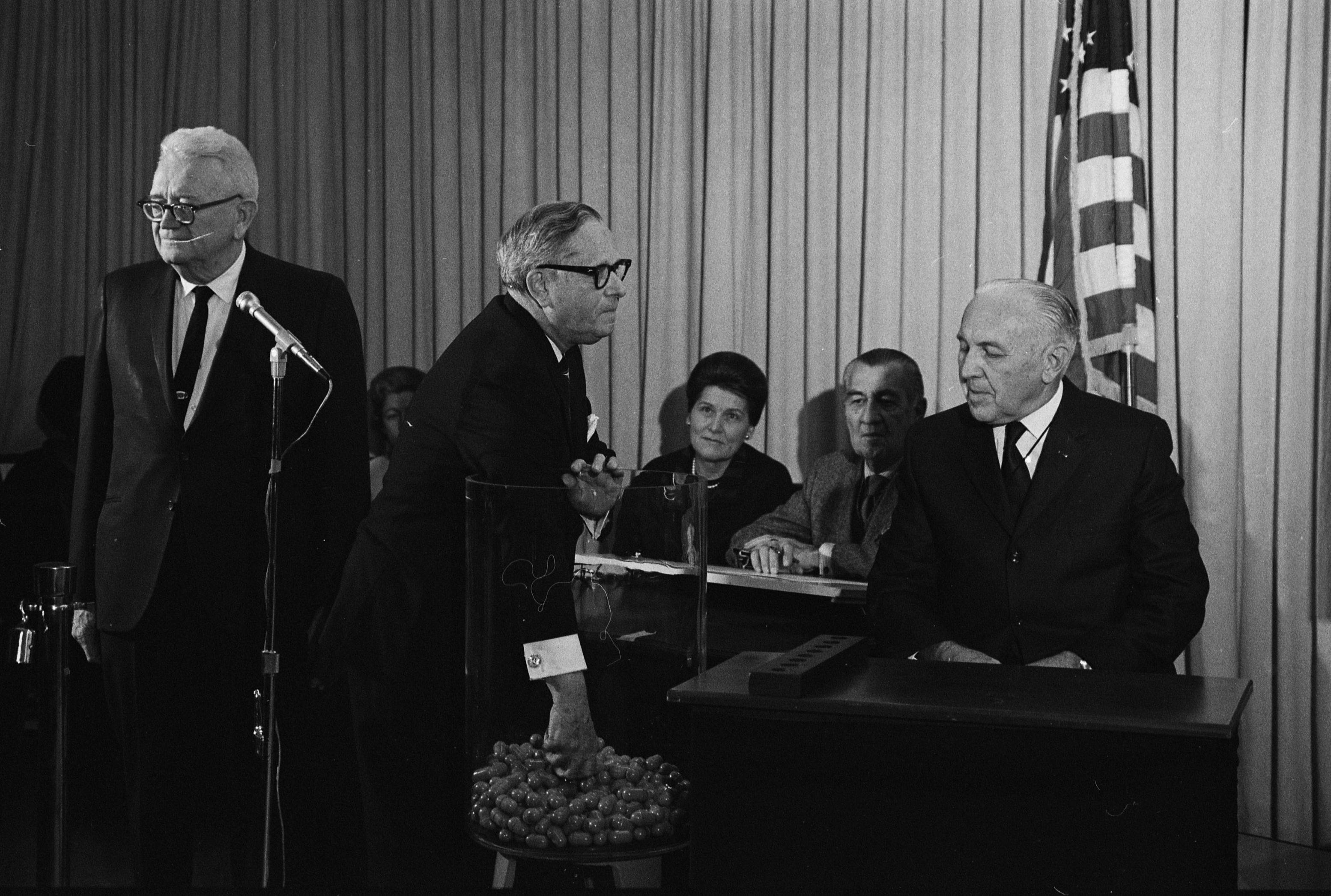
December 1, 1969: Congressman Pirnie drawing the first number

- The first draft lottery in the United States since 1942 (and the first in peacetime) was held, and September 14 was the first of the 366 days of the year selected, with Congressman Alexander Pirnie of New York making the first selection. The significance was that those to be given highest priority by their local draft boards were men born on September 14, 1950, and those born on September 14 from 1943 to 1949. The drawing took place at the Selective Service headquarters in Washington, D.C., starting at 8:00 in the evening and concluded 87 minutes later. The random drawing was made from 366 plastic capsules, each one containing a piece of paper with one of the dates of the year. The remaining nine days picked were April 24, December 30, February 14, October 18, September 6, October 26, September 7, November 22 and December 6, while the 366th and last selection was June 8. On January 4, 1970, The New York Times would run a long article, "Statisticians Charge Draft Lottery Was Not Random".
- Municipal elections are held in Ottawa, Canada. Kenneth Fogarty is elected mayor, winning 81.26% of the vote.
- TriMet, the Tri-County Metropolitan Transportation District of Oregon, began operations with bus service in the three counties in Portland, Oregon, the day after its contract with drivers and mechanics was approved by Union Local 757. It would add railway service in 1986 with the start of MAX Light Rail (Metropolitan Area Express).

== December 2, 1969 (Tuesday) ==
- In China, Lin Biao's son, Lin Liguo, was promoted to the position of Deputy Chief of Operations of the People's Liberation Army Air Force, and allowed full command of that branch of the service. The order came from Lin Biao himself, the Defense Minister of the People's Republic of China. Nearly 11 years later, former PLAAF General Wu Faxian would testify at his own trial that he had carried out Lin Biao's order and that the resulting chaos "nearly destroyed the Air Force" and that many of Wu's colleague's were killed as the Cultural Revolution decimated the air service. Wu was one of 10 defendants in the Gang of Four trial held in 1980.
- The Boeing 747 jumbo jet made its first passenger flight. It carried 191 people, 110 of them reporters and photographers, from Seattle, to New York City. Piloted by Jack Waddell, the chartered Pan American World Airways flight departed the manufacturer's test site, Boeing Field, at 7:25 in the morning local time and arrived in New York four hours and two minutes later, where the time was 2:27 in the afternoon. It was greeted upon its arrival by Charles A. Lindbergh, the first person to make a solo airplane flight across the Atlantic Ocean.
- At least 51 people were killed in a fire at Repos du Viellard, an "old folks home" in Notre-Dame-du-Lac, Quebec; 22 other people survived, including the rest home's owner, wife and children.
- Died:
  - José María Arguedas, 58, Peruvian novelist, shot himself while sitting in his office at the National Agrarian University in La Molina, a suburb of Lima. As part of what one critic would describe later as "what must be the most ambitious suicide note in history", Arguedas left behind detailed instructions for the completion of his unfinished novel, The Fox From Up Above and the Fox From Down Below (El zorro de arriba y el zorro de abajo), which would be published posthumously in 1971.
  - Marshal Kliment Voroshilov, 88, former nominal head of state of the Soviet Union from 1953 to 1960 as Chairman of the Presidium of the Supreme Soviet, for whom the KV tank series was named.

== December 3, 1969 (Wednesday) ==
- Air France Flight 212 crashed into the Caribbean Sea shortly after takeoff from the Caracas airport in Venezuela toward Pointe-à-Pitre on the island of Guadeloupe, killing all 62 people on board. A later investigation would conclude that a dynamite bomb had been placed within one of the wheel wells prior to the Boeing 707's takeoff. Over a year earlier, on March 5, 1968, another Flight 212 for Air France crashed during its scheduled flight from Caracas to Pointe-à-Pitre, killing all 63 people on board.
- Born: Hal Steinbrenner, American businessman and baseball executive, chairman of Yankee Global Enterprises, in Culver, Indiana
- Died: Ruth White, 55, American character actress on television and stage, 1964 Emmy Award winner and 1962 off-Broadway Obie Award winner, died from cancer.

== December 4, 1969 (Thursday) ==
- The Tokyo Convention, formally known as the Convention on Offences and Certain Other Acts Committed on Board Aircraft, came into effect after being agreed on September 14, 1963.
- A Boy Named Charlie Brown, the first feature film based on the Peanuts comic strip, was released to theaters for the first time.
- Born: Jay-Z (stage name for Shawn Corey Carter), American rap music author and record producer; in Brooklyn
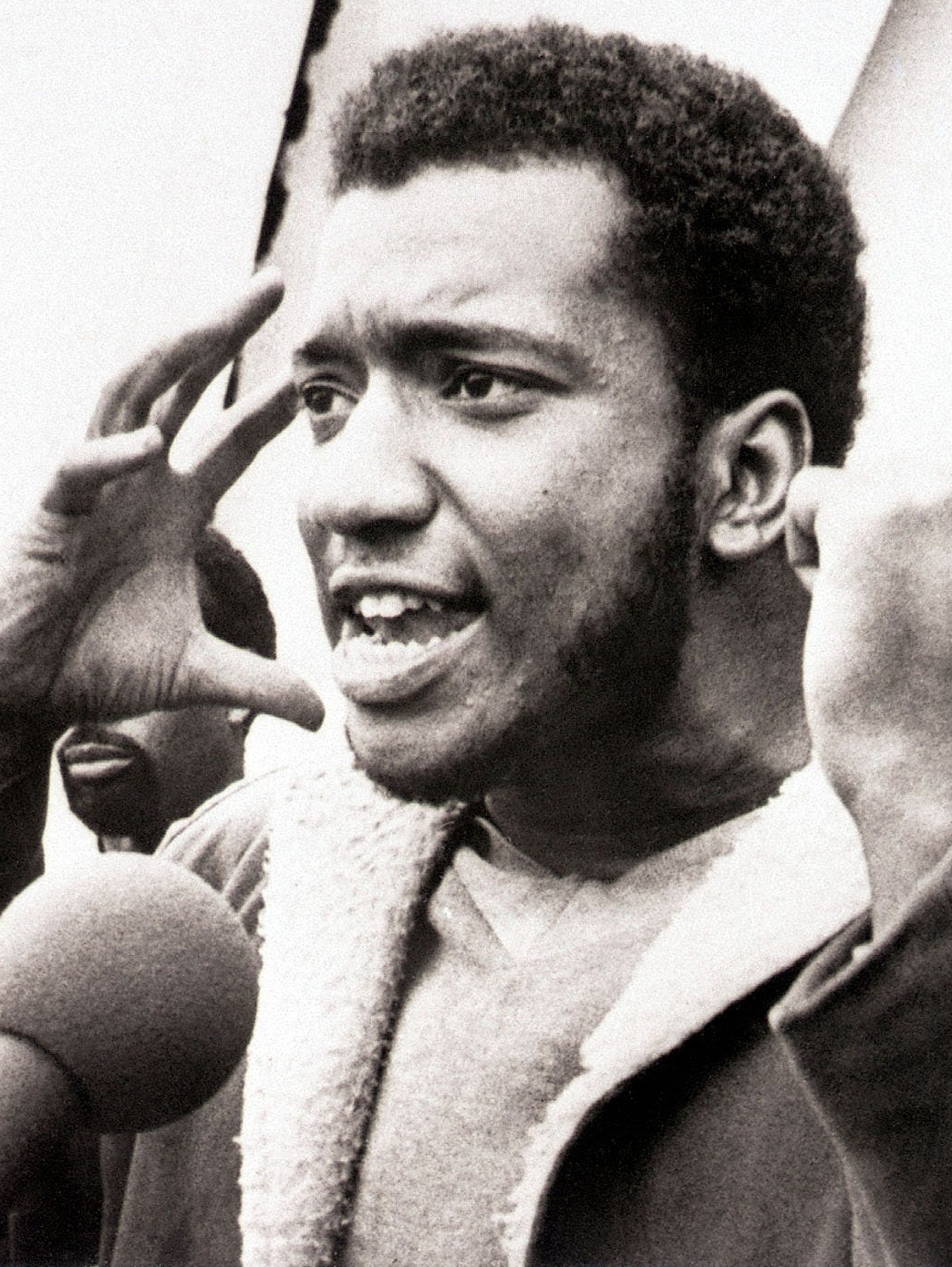
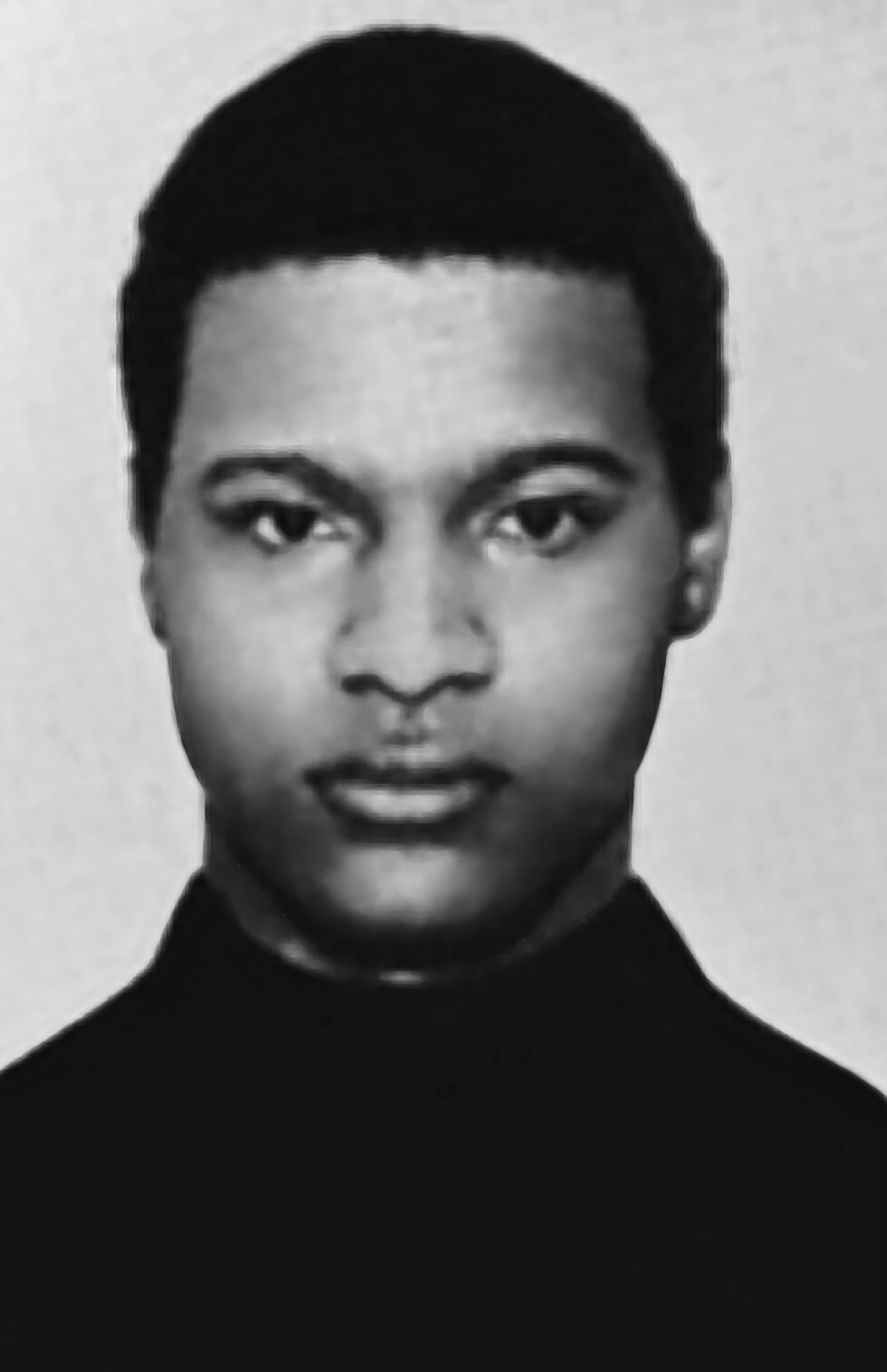
Black Panther's Hampton and Clark
- Died: Fred Hampton, 21, and Mark Clark, 22, American civil rights activists, were killed by the Chicago Police during a raid on the Panther location at 2337 Monroe Street after the signing of a search warrant for illegal weapons. Hampton, the Black Panther Party's Illinois chairman, was unarmed and asleep in bed when shot.

== December 5, 1969 (Friday) ==
- The initial plan for the first network of computer systems in different U.S. states, ARPANET, was realized as the University of Utah in Salt Lake City became the fourth of the four nodes for the data sharing of the Advanced Research Projects Agency of the U.S. Department of Defense. The Utah node joined the three in California at the University of California, Los Angeles (UCLA), the Stanford Research Institute (SRI) in Menlo Park, and the University of California, Santa Barbara (UCSB).
- Born: Catherine Tate, English television actress and comedienne; as Catherine Ford in Bloomsbury
- Died: Princess Alice of Battenberg, 84, English princess who was the mother-in-law of Queen Elizabeth II as the mother of Prince Philip, Duke of Edinburgh.

== December 6, 1969 (Saturday) ==
- In a rare matchup in college football between the top two ranked teams in the nation, the #1 ranked Texas Longhorns rallied from a 14–0 deficit with two fourth quarter touchdowns, to edge the #2 Arkansas Razorbacks, 15–14, at Fayetteville. The game was attended by the U.S. President Richard Nixon and several high-ranking government dignitaries, including future President George H. W. Bush. The victory clinched the national championship for the Longhorns of the coaches poll conducted by United Press International. Texas would win the postseason Associated Press poll of sportswriters and the national championship by defeating Notre Dame, 21–17, in the Cotton Bowl on New Year's Day.
- The Altamont Free Concert was held at the Altamont Speedway near Tracy, California and drew 300,000 people. Hosted by The Rolling Stones, it was an attempt at a "Woodstock West" and was better known for the four deaths that happened during the day, including the beating and stabbing to death of one of the spectators, Meredith Hunter, by the Hells Angels motorcycle group hired as security guards. Mark Seiger and Richard Salov died when a car ran off the highway and plowed into them while they sat around a campfire. Another man, identified almost two weeks later as Leonard Kryszak of New York, climbed over a fence and drowned in one of the canals of the California Aqueduct.

== December 7, 1969 (Sunday) ==
- The animated Christmas special Frosty the Snowman, adapted from the song of the same name, was shown on television for the first time, shown at 7:30 in the evening on CBS. Produced by Rankin/Bass Productions, the special was popular with critics and viewers; the Boston Globe commented that the show was "a delightful charade that deserves to become a yuletide fixture".
- Born: Patrice O'Neal, American comedian; in New York City (died of complications from a stroke, 2011)
- Died: Francis "Lefty" O'Doul, 72, American professional baseball manager and former MLB outfielder, enshrinee in the Japanese Baseball Hall of Fame.

== December 8, 1969 (Monday) ==
- All 90 people on board Olympic Airways Flight 954 were killed when the DC-6 plane crashed into the side of Mount Paneio near the Greek village of Keratea, about 25 miles (40 km) from its destination of Athens. The plane had taken off an hour earlier from the island of Crete and was caught in what was described as "driving rain and hurricane-force winds" as it approached the Greek capital.
- A grand jury in Los Angeles indicted Charles Manson and four of his followers (Charles "Tex" Watson, Patricia Krenwinkel, Linda Kasabian, Susan Atkins) on seven counts of murder arising from the Tate-LaBianca murders exactly four months earlier. A sixth defendant, Leslie Sankston, was charged with two counts of murder in connection with the LaBianca murders.

== December 9, 1969 (Tuesday) ==
- W. A. "Tony" Boyle was re-elected as president of the United Mine Workers of America, defeating challenger Joseph "Jock" Yablonski by a wide margin. Three weeks after the election, Yablonski and two members of his family would be murdered, and Boyle would eventually be convicted of the conspiracy to kill them.
- Born: Jakob Dylan, American rock musician and founder of The Wallflowers; in Los Angeles, as the son of Bob Dylan and Sara Noznisky Dylan

== December 10, 1969 (Wednesday) ==
- Construction of the Federal Reserve Bunker, a storage facility for several billion dollars' worth of United States currency, was completed. The building and its underground facilities were housed within Mount Pony, part of the Blue Ridge Mountains, near Culpeper, Virginia, with the purpose of preventing the failure of the United States economy in the event of a nuclear war or a similarly catastrophic national emergency. Following the end of the Cold War between the United States and the Soviet Union, the currency was removed and the storage facilities now used by the Library of Congress as an archive for fragile media created during the 20th Century, including film stock and audio and video recordings.
- The Viale Lazio massacre was carried out in Sicily at Viale Lazio 106 in Palermo, location of the Girolamo Moncada Construction Company, the front for Sicilian Mafia gang boss Michele Cavataio. Dressed in police uniforms, five hitmen led by Bernardo Provenzano raided Cavataio's office in what appeared to be a routine arrest, then opened fire with machine guns. In the gun battle that followed, Cavataio and three of his associates were killed, along with one of the members of the hit squad, Calogero Bagarella. The attack brought an end to a truce between the rival gangs in Sicily.
- Émile Derlin Zinsou, the President of Dahomey since his installation by the West African nation's Army on July 17, 1968, was overthrown in a coup led by Lieutenant Colonel Maurice Kouandété. Lt. Col. Kouandété would be removed from office in a second coup three days later.

== December 11, 1969 (Thursday) ==
- A Korean Air Lines turboprop airliner, with 46 South Korean passengers and a crew of four, was hijacked to North Korea, shortly after takeoff from Gangneung (Kangnung) on a flight toward Seoul. At 12:25 in the afternoon, Cho Ch'ang-hŭi, a North Korean agent, entered the cockpit of the plane and directed the crew to fly to the north. Once in North Korean airspace, the airliner was escorted by North Korean Air Force jets and landed at Wonsan. Thirty-nine of the 46 passengers would be allowed to return home on February 14, 1970, but the other seven, as well as the pilot, the copilot and two stewardesses, would never be allowed to leave. Nearly 50 years after their abduction, the fate of the 11 South Korean detainees remains unknown.
- For the fifth time in the 20th century, a supernova within the spiral galaxy NGC 6946 was observed from Earth, at least 22 million years after it had occurred. Working from Padua, Italian astronomer Leonida Rosino reported the star that had been destroyed, now designated as SN1969P. Other supernovae had been seen by Earth astronomers in 1917, 1939, 1948 and 1968, and five more would be observed in later years (1980, 2002, 2004, 2008 and 2017).
- Born: Viswanathan Anand, Indian chess grandmaster and a former five-time World Chess Champion; in Mayiladuthurai, Tamil Nadu state

== December 12, 1969 (Friday) ==
- Fourteen people were killed and 90 others injured in Milan in what would become known as the Piazza Fontana bombing. The explosion happened at the headquarters of the Banca Nazionale Dell'Agricoltura at the Italian city's Strage di Piazza Fontana. Three of the critically injured people would later die of their wounds. Two neo-Fascist terrorists, Giovanni Ventura and Franco Freda, were charged with the bombing but never put on trial. They would be released from prison on September 7, 1976, in conjunction with a new law passed in Italy setting a four-year limit on detention without a trial, but transferred to exile on the island of Giglio.
- The Jackson 5 released their iconic debut album Diana Ross Presents The Jackson 5. The album contains their first hit single, "I Want You Back".

== December 13, 1969 (Saturday) ==
- Colonel Paul-Émile de Souza was released from house arrest and installed as the new President of Dahomey and the chief of a three-member military junta. The move came in a counter-coup against Maurice Kouandété, who had proclaimed himself president of the West African nation three days earlier in a coup d'état. The Republic of Dahomey would change its name, in 1975, to the People's Republic of Benin and has been known as Benin ever since.
- The Continental Football League held its fifth, and final, championship game with the Indianapolis Capitols beating the San Antonio Toros, 44 to 38, in sudden death overtime. Three months later, both the Capitols and the Toros withdrew from the Continental League, which had 22 minor league pro football teams from New Jersey to California in 1969, and the CoFL folded.
- Died:
  - Spencer Williams Jr., 76, African-American actor and film director, known for portraying Andy Brown on the TV adaptation of the radio series The Amos 'n Andy Show.
  - Swami Ashokananda, 76, Indian-born American Hindu spiritualist and promoter of the Vedanta philosophy in California.

== December 14, 1969 (Sunday) ==
- During a halftime show at an NFL football game between the Vikings and 49ers in Minneapolis, a large hot air balloon broke its moorings and carried its passenger, an 11-year-old boy, out of Metropolitan Stadium in Bloomington and traveled 3 miles (4.8 km) before landing in the Minnesota River. The boy, Rick Snyder, was able to swim to shore and return to see the end of the game.
- The murder of Diane Maxwell took place, when the 25-year-old phone operator was found sexually assaulted and killed. The case would remain unsolved until 2003.
- The Jackson 5 made their first appearance on The Ed Sullivan Show, performing "Stand!", "Who's Lovin' You", and "I Want You Back".

== December 15, 1969 (Monday) ==
- The Shell Oil tanker Marpessa became "the biggest ship ever to sink", three days after an explosion ripped the 207,000 lb (94,000 kg) vessel open while it was traveling from Rotterdam to the Persian Gulf. All but two of the crew were able to evacuate before the ship went down in the Atlantic Ocean 80 miles (130 km) off the coast of Senegal.
- U.S. President Nixon announced that he would bring an additional 50,000 American troops out of the Vietnam War over the next four months, marking the withdrawal of over 110,000 U.S. servicemen during the first year of his administration.
- Died: Giuseppe Pinelli, 41, Italian railroad worker and anarchist who was detained by the Polizia di Stato for questioning regarding the Piazza Fontana bombing, fell to his death from a fourth story window of the Milan police station

== December 16, 1969 (Tuesday) ==
- Six fans of the India national cricket team were killed and 50 injured (10 of them seriously) in a stampede outside of the Eden Gardens stadium, before the last day of the fourth test match in the violence-marred Australia v. India test cricket series in Calcutta. A report noted that "A crowd of 20,000 had queued all night for tickets" for the final day of play, "But only 6000 to 7000 were for sale." Australia won the fourth test by 10 wickets and won the best-3-of-5 series in the fifth test, in Madras, on December 29, by 77 runs.
- The House of Commons of the United Kingdom voted, 343 to 185, to make permanent the abolition of capital punishment for murder. The Murder Act of 1965 had provided for a five-year ban, but had included a provision that hanging would be restored effective July 31, 1970, "unless Parliament by affirmative resolutions of both Houses" voted otherwise. The House of Lords provided its affirmative resolution two days later.
- Born:
  - Lei Jun, Chinese billionaire entrepreneur and philanthropist, founder the consumer electronics company Xiaomi; in Xiantao, Hubei
  - Michelle Smith, Irish Olympian and swimmer, winner of 3 gold medals in the 1996 Olympics; in Rathcoole, County Dublin

== December 17, 1969 (Wednesday) ==
- The first widely publicized warning of climate change, caused by pollution, was delivered by physical scientist Joseph O. Fletcher of the Rand Corporation. Fletcher told the assembled scientists that "Very substantial changes have taken place during our lifetime" in the increase in temperature in the first part of the 20th century, resulting in the melting of the ice caps of the Earth; that carbon dioxide had been responsible for up to one half of the warming; and that although mankind's influence on the warning had been small compared to natural causes, "within another generation, man will become important, the carbon dioxide pollution apparently being the most important" and that the world had "only a few decades to solve the problem". Colonel Fletcher's speech to a meeting of the American Geophysical Union, in San Francisco, was covered by reporter Duston Harvey and then disseminated by United Press International.
- In a record for an American late-night television show, around 30-50 million people tuned in to watch the wedding of falsetto-voiced singer Herbert Buckingham Khaury, better known by his stage name, Tiny Tim, on The Tonight Show, hosted by Johnny Carson. Tim's 17-year-old bride, Victoria Mae Budinger, was quickly nicknamed "Miss Vicky" by the American press. The ceremony itself had taken place before an audience of 250 people, at 7:43 in the evening, during the videotaping of the Tonight Show at its studio at the NBC television network's headquarters in New York. Tim, famous for his bestselling recording of "Tiptoe Through the Tulips", walked to the altar through 10,000 tulips imported from the Netherlands for the occasion.
- Project Blue Book, the United States government's official investigation of sightings of unidentified flying objects, more commonly referred to as "UFOs" or "flying saucers", was ordered closed after 21 years by U.S. Secretary of the Air Force Robert Seamans. In the years after the program was established in 1948, the U.S. Air force investigated 12,618 sightings and found explanations for all but 701 of them. Seamans said in a statement that "Continuation of the Project cannot be justified either on the ground of national security or in the interest of science." The closure took effect on January 30, 1970.
- Born: Robinah Nabbanja, Ugandan educator and politician, 11th Prime Minister of Uganda since 2021

== December 18, 1969 (Thursday) ==
- Capital punishment for murder was ended permanently in the United Kingdom by a voice vote of the House of Lords, two days after the House of Commons voted to eliminate an expiration date for the Murder Act of 1965. Royal assent was not required because the vote was a follow-up to language from the 1965 Act that the ban would be temporary "unless Parliament by affirmative resolutions of both Houses otherwise determines" that it should not expire on July 31, 1970. Earlier in the day, the Lords had considered a compromise that would have extended the expiration date to December 31, 1972, but rejected the amendment with 220 against and 174 in favor, making it clear that the voice vote to eliminate the sunset provision would pass by the same margin.
- Only seven days after the top secret Lockheed SR-71 Blackbird supersonic spy plane began test flights, the multimillion-dollar U.S. aircraft began encountering control problems that were traced to a piece of rolled-up duct tape that had been left inside a pitot tube during the installation of a new camera system. The tape, used as a plug to prevent dust from getting into the pitot tube during the work, was no larger in diameter than a cigarette, but caused the aircraft's pitot-static system to malfunction. The two U.S. Air Force test pilots, Colonel Joe Rogers and Major Gary Heidelbaugh, were able to eject to safety at an altitude of 65,000 feet (20,000 m), while the SR-71 crashed near Shoshone, California in Death Valley.
- The sixth James Bond film, On Her Majesty's Secret Service, held its world premiere at the Odeon Leicester Square in London, with George Lazenby as Agent 007. The film would premiere in the United States the following day.
- Saudi Arabia and Kuwait signed a treaty that divided the Neutral Zone that had existed as a buffer between the two nations since 1922.

== December 19, 1969 (Friday) ==
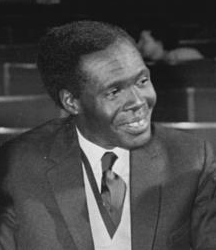
President Obote

- Milton Obote, the President of Uganda, survived an assassination attempt despite being wounded by a gunman who was aiming at his head from a distance of 30 feet (9.1 m). President Obote had just completed the three day meeting of his political party, the Uganda People's Congress, and was leaving the Lugogo Stadium in Kampala when he was shot by a taxi driver, Mohamed Sebaduka, who had infiltrated the convention site. His first shot struck Obote in the jaw, breaking two teeth and coming out through his cheek; another assassin, Muganda Yowana Wamala, threw a hand grenade at the President, but the projectile failed to explode. Three other shots missed as the gun's firing angle changed.
- Born:
  - Kristy Swanson, American film actress who created the title role in Buffy the Vampire Slayer; in Mission Viejo, California
  - Lauren Sánchez, American news anchor; in Albuquerque, New Mexico

== December 20, 1969 (Saturday) ==
- From his hospital bed, Uganda's President Obote declared a state of emergency and banned all political parties except for his own, the Uganda People's Congress. Obote's dictatorial rule would continue until his overthrow a little more than a year later by General Idi Amin Dada on January 25, 1971.
- Died: Adolfo Consolini, 52, Italian discus thrower and 1948 Olympic gold medalist, died from viral hepatitis.

== December 21, 1969 (Sunday) ==
- The Yamato 691 meteorite was discovered by members of the 1969–70 Japanese Antarctic Research Expedition on a field of ice at the base of the Queen Fabiola Mountains, known also as the Yamato Mountains, and the 715 grams (25.2 oz) stone would prove to contain a variety of minerals, including one previously not observed on Earth, compound of titanium and sulfur with a "unique crystal structure". More than 40 years later, the compound would be given the name wassonite.
- The Gay Activists Alliance was founded by dissident members of the Gay Liberation Front, almost six months after the Stonewall riots.
- Born:
  - Magnus Samuelsson, Swedish athlete and winner of the 1998 World's Strongest Man competition; in Linköping
  - Julie Delpy, French-born American film director; in Paris
- Died: General Georges Catroux, 92, French Army officer and diplomat, Commander of the Free French forces during World War II, former Governor General of French Indochina, and former ambassador to the Soviet Union.

== December 22, 1969 (Monday) ==
- Twenty-four people, most of them schoolchildren, were killed in Nha Trang, South Vietnam, when an Air Vietnam DC-6 airliner crashed into their building during an emergency landing attempt. Ten of the 70 passengers on the flight from Saigon to Nha Trang died in the crash as well, which occurred after a bomb exploded inside the plane while it was making its descent.
- Eleven sailors at the Miramar Naval Air Station in San Diego died, and seven were seriously injured, after a disabled U.S. Navy F-8 Crusader jet plunged into the aircraft hangar where the group had been gathered. Moments earlier, the F-8 pilot had reported a malfunction and ejected safely from the aircraft.
- Died:
  - Enrique Peñaranda, 77, 38th President of Bolivia from 1940 to 1943 and commander of Bolivian forces during the latter part of the Chaco War against Paraguay during the 1930s.
  - Josef von Sternberg, 75, Austrian-born American filmmaker

== December 23, 1969 (Tuesday) ==
- Seventy-five bus riders were killed in Yerevan, at the time part of the Soviet Union and capital of the Armenian SSR. The group, mostly workers making their early morning commute, was on an overcrowded bus which hit a patch of ice and plunged over a cliff. As was common in the Soviet era, the incident was not published in the news, and was not disclosed until three days later.
- Born: Greg Biffle, American stock car racing driver; in Vancouver, Washington
- Died: Tiburcio Carías, 93, Honduran politician and military officer, 38th President of Honduras from 1933 to 1949

== December 24, 1969 (Wednesday) ==
- Phillips Petroleum made the first discovery of oil in Norway after drilling in the Norwegian sector of North Sea.
- Nigerian troops captured Umuahia, the last capital of the breakaway republic of Biafra.
- Charles Manson was allowed to defend himself at the Tate-LaBianca murder trial.
- Born:
  - Leavander Johnson, American boxer who won the IBF light heavyweight world championship in 2005; in Atlantic City, New Jersey (died of brain injuries, 2005)
  - Ed Miliband, British politician and Leader of the Opposition from 2010 to 2015 during the premiership of David Cameron; in Fitzrovia district
  - Oleg Skripochka, Russian cosmonaut on the International Space Station from 2010 to 2011; in Nevinnomyssk, Stavropol Krai, Russian SFSR
  - Jonathan Zittrain, American computer scientist and legal scholar; in Pittsburgh
- Died:
  - Cortelia Clark, 63, African-American blues singer and Grammy Award winner in 1967 for Blues in the Street
  - Seabury Quinn, 80, American horror fiction author and creator of the "Jules de Grandin" mystery series
  - Jaybhikhkhu, 61, Indian Gujarati novelist, playwright, essayist, and biographer

== December 25, 1969 (Thursday) ==
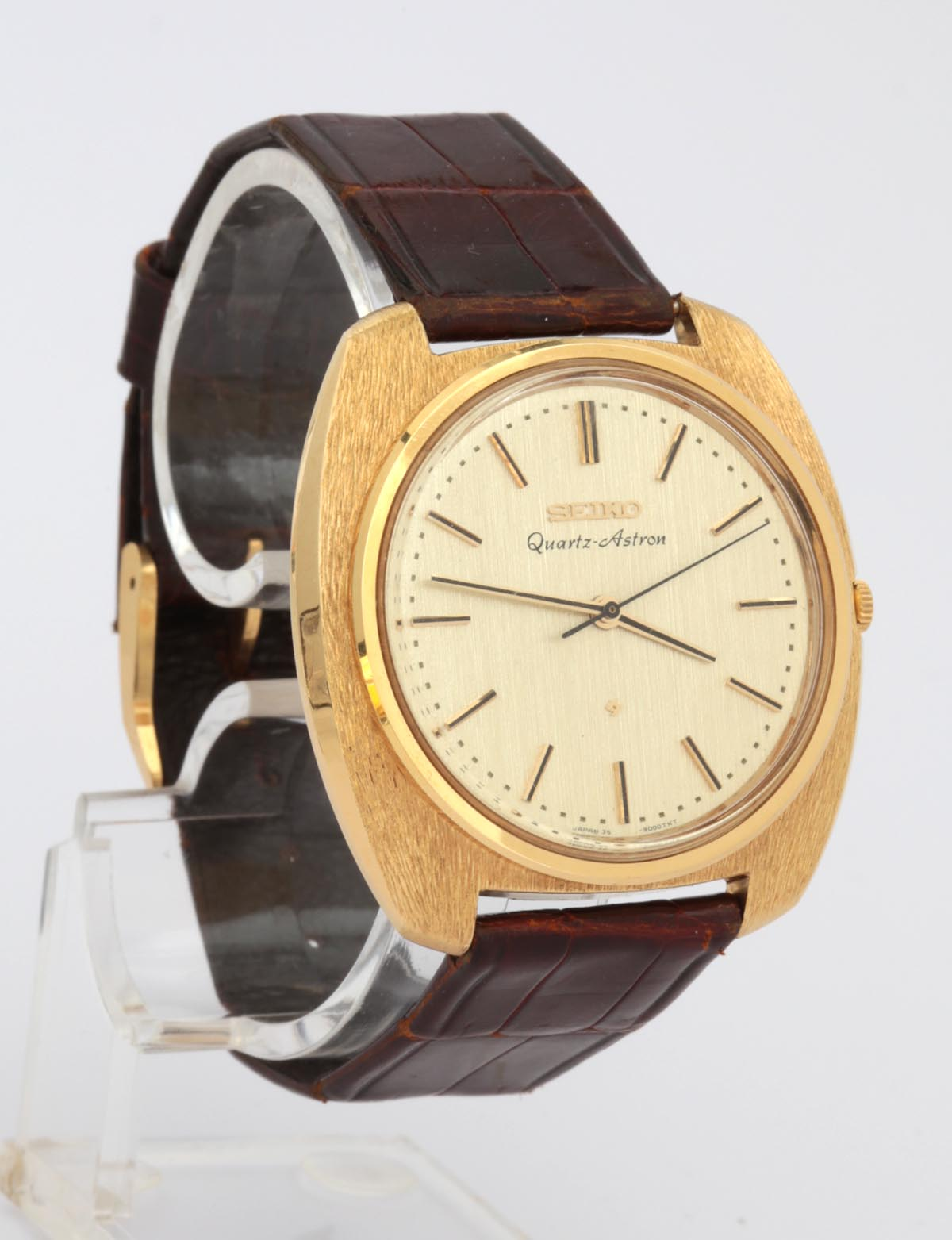
The world's most accurate wristwatch

- Seiko, the Japanese electronics manufacturer, introduced the world's first quartz clock wristwatch, the Astron (officially, the "Seiko Quartz-Astron 35SQ"), at a press conference in Tokyo. The electronic timepiece was the most accurate wristwatch in the world at the time, guaranteed to be accurate within five seconds for every month of use, and began a new era in watch manufacturing. One historian of timepieces would later write that "Astron was the shot heard around the watch world, beginning an upheaval that radically rearranged that world. It shifted the balance of power to the Far East, toppled Switzerland as the world’s watch production leader, sent the Swiss watch industry into a two-decade-long tailspin (between 1970 and 1988 Swiss watch employment fell from 90,000 to 28,000), brought a quantum leap in watch accuracy, a quantum change in watch styling, and much more."

== December 26, 1969 (Friday) ==
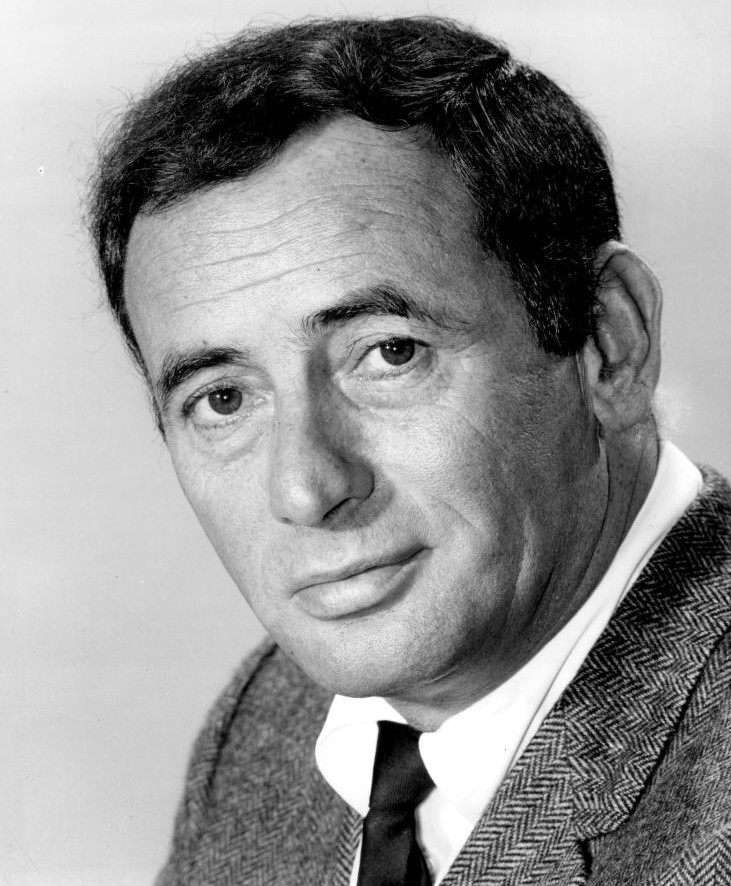
Bishop

- The Joey Bishop Show, the ABC television network's late-night attempt to compete against The Tonight Show Starring Johnny Carson on NBC, was telecast for the last time, a little more than two and a half years after its April 17, 1967 debut. As one commentator would note at the time, "The Joey Bishop Show was third in the ratings because of the number of ABC affiliates that didn't carry the program" (Today (Titusville, FL), December 28, 1969). Bishop, who had deferred to guest hosts more often toward the end of the series, appeared for the opening monologue, thanked the audience and viewers, then left, leaving his sidekick, Regis Philbin, to host for the remainder of the 90 minutes.
- Twenty-six merchant marines were killed in the destruction of the American freighter SS Badger State. Formerly the U.S. Navy transport ship USS Starlight, the SS Badger State was transporting ordnance for the U.S. Air Force, including bombs and rockets to be used in the Vietnam War. The 459 ft (140 m) long ship had picked up its cargo from the Bangor Base, Washington, near Seattle, and was en route to Da Nang in South Vietnam. At 11:05 a.m. Hawaii time (22:05 UTC), Badger State was about 1,500 miles (2,400 km) north of Hawaii and sailing in a storm, when part of the cargo broke loose and started a fire. The order was given to abandon ship. All but one of the 40 crew were able to escape into life rafts an hour before the ship exploded, but only one raft, with 14 survivors, was rescued, all by a Greek ship, the Khian Star. After a week, and the recovery of five bodies, the U.S. Navy abandoned its search as well as any attempts to put out the fires. The ship sank late in the evening on January 5.

== December 27, 1969 (Saturday) ==
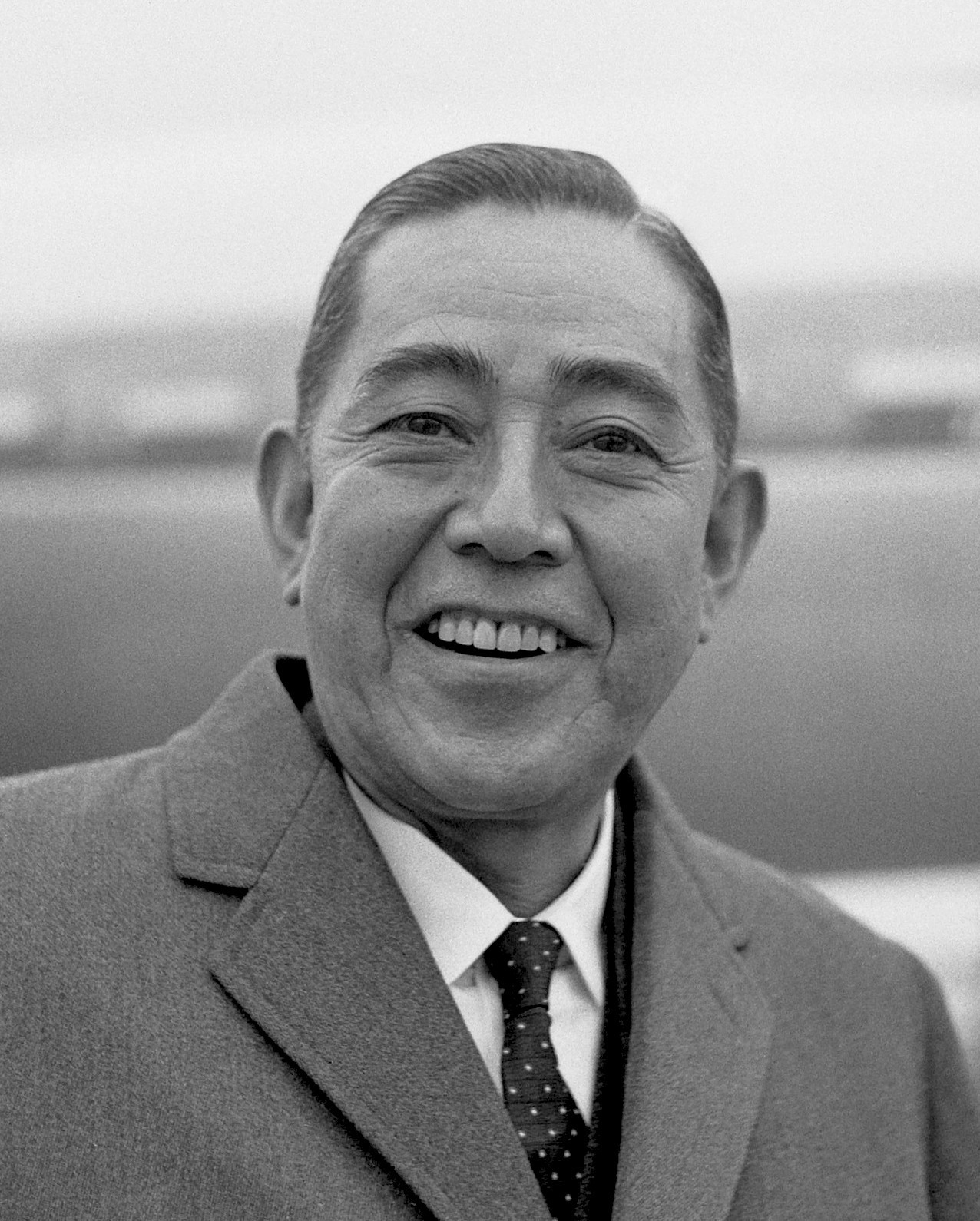
Prime Minister Satō

- Japan's Liberal Democratic Party, led by Prime Minister Eisaku Satō, increased its large majority in House of Representatives elections, adding 11 seats to get 288 of the 486 available.
- Born:
  - Chyna (ring name for Joan Marie Laurer), American professional wrestler for WWF; in Rochester, New York (died from alcohol and drug overdose, 2016)
  - Sarah Vowell, American historian and bestselling author; in Muskogee, Oklahoma

== December 28, 1969 (Sunday) ==
- In New York, the Young Lords, a Puerto Rican militant group, took over the First Spanish Methodist Church at 111th Street and Lexington Avenue in East Harlem and then used it for the next 11 days to make positive contributions to the Hispanic community in the city. Temporarily renaming the building "The People's Church", the Young Lords provided a clinic, a day care center, breakfast, evening entertainment and classes at no charge until space could be secured for a Young Lords center in the Bronx. The group surrendered peacefully on January 7. The takeover brought publicity to the needs of Puerto Ricans who had moved to or who had been born in the mainland U.S., and inspired the "Nuyorican Movement" for New Yorkers of Puerto Rican descent.
- South African astronomer John Caister Bennett discovered a comet previously not observed from Earth. Officially "C/1969 Y1", "Comet Bennett" was logged at 19:41 UTC (9:41 at night local time), and would make its closest approach to Earth on March 27, passing within 64,000,000 miles (103,000,000 km) and being visible to the naked eye. The Perth Observatory calculated that the comet had an orbital period of 1,700 years and that it will not approach Earth again until the 37th century.
- Born: Linus Torvalds, Finnish-born American computer software engineer who developed the Linux free software operating system at age 21; in Helsinki

== December 29, 1969 (Monday) ==
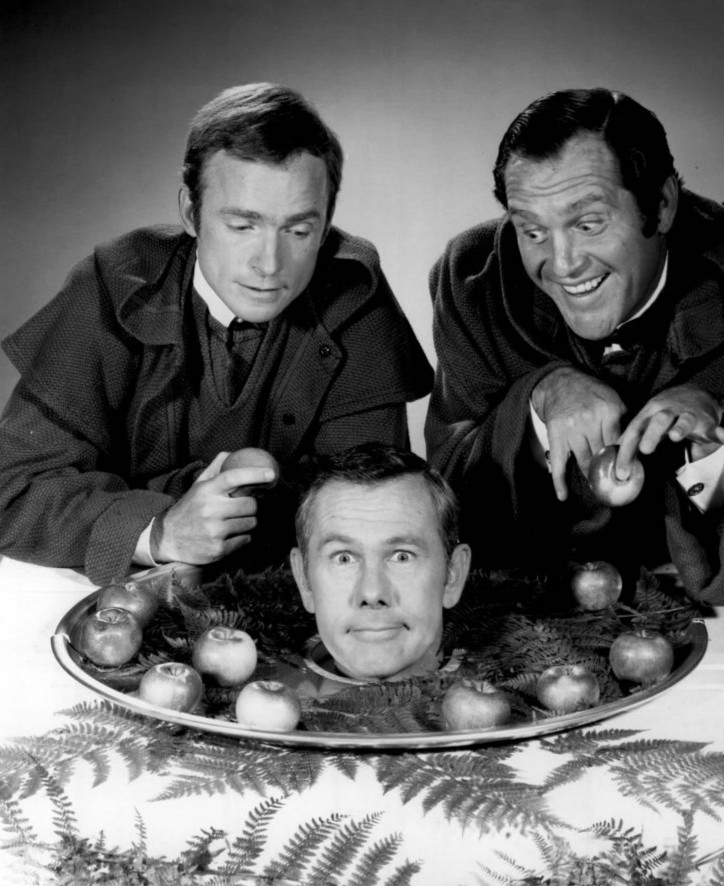
December 29, 1969: Cavett (left) challenges "King of Late Night" Carson (center)

- The Dick Cavett Show, the ABC television network's second attempt at a late night talk show to compete against NBC's Johnny Carson, premiered at 11:30 Eastern time. Replacing The Joey Bishop Show, Cavett's program originated from New York City and would run for five years, lasting until the end of 1974. In his opening monologue, he introduced himself to viewers as "funnier than Chet Huntley, taller than Mickey Rooney, and as pure and honest as Newark, New Jersey". His first guest was actor Woody Allen, followed by Robert Shaw, opera star Beverly Sills and Jacqueline Grennan Wexler, the president of New York City's Hunter College.
- Born: Fred Hampton Jr., American political activist and son of Black Panther Party Illinois chairman, Fred Hampton, who was assassinated 25 days earlier; in Chicago, Illinois
- Died: Ricardo de la Guardia, 70, 11th President of Panama from 1941 to 1945

== December 30, 1969 (Tuesday) ==
- U.S. President Nixon signed the Federal Coal Mine Health and Safety Act of 1969 into law, setting the first nationwide standards for regulation of the coal industry and creating what is now called the Mine Safety and Health Administration.
- Born:
  - Jay Kay, British singer-songwriter, frontman of Jamiroquai; as Jason Luís Cheetham in Stretford
  - David Rawlings, American guitarist and singer; in North Smithfield, Rhode Island
  - Kersti Kaljulaid, the first woman to be elected President of Estonia; in Tartu

== December 31, 1969 (Wednesday) ==
Republic of the Congo

People's Republic of Congo

- Marien Ngouabi, the chairman of the National Revolutionary Council of the former French Congo and the African nation's de facto ruler, announced in the capital at Brazzaville that he would implement a Marxist system of government, with the nation's name to be changed to the People's Republic of the Congo, and the name of the sole legal political organization to become the Congolese Workers' Party (Parti congolais du travail or PCT). Decisions for the nation would be run by the PCT Politburo of 10 members, selected from the PCT's 40 member central committee, and the nation's flag would be replaced by a red banner. Ngouabi would serve as both president and chairman of the PCT.
- Joe Namath of the New York Jets was named the final American Football League Player of the Year, despite his Jets failing to return to the AFL Title Game, apparently because of his historic win in Super Bowl III at the beginning of 1969. The AFL was merged into the National Football League for the 1970 season.
- Died:
  - Joseph "Jock" Yablonski, 59, a candidate for the presidency of the United Mine Workers of America, was murdered along with his wife and his 25-year-old daughter by a trio of hitmen who invaded his home in Clarksville, Pennsylvania. The three bodies were not discovered until five days later, when all three were found shot to death in their beds. The murders would be traced to the man whom Yablonski was challenging, UMWA President Tony Boyle.
  - Carol Thurston (born Betty Lou Thurston), 49, American film and television actress, died of a heart attack.
