= Titanium(II) sulfide =

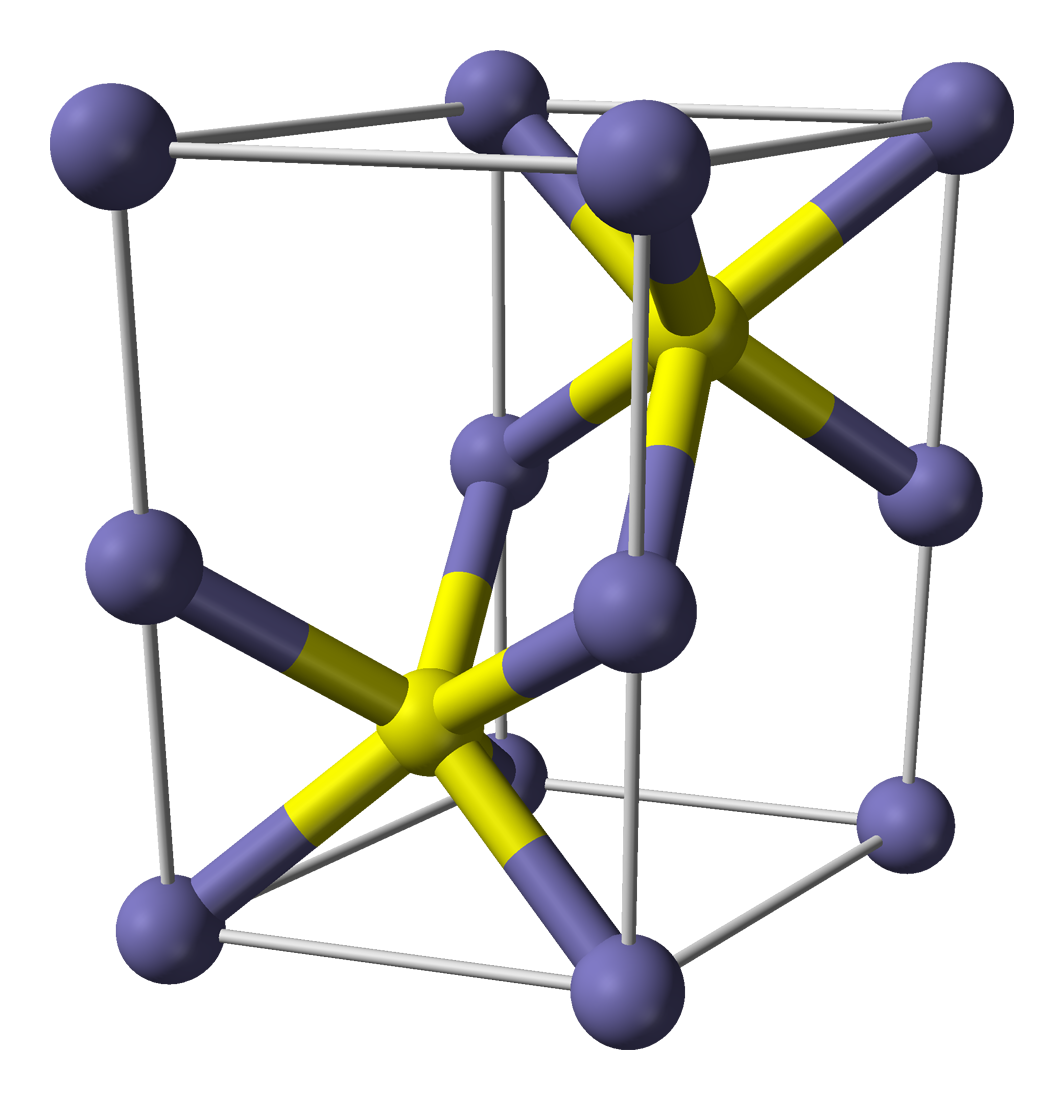
- Titanium(II) sulfide

Names
- Other names titanium monosulfide, Wassonite

Identifiers
CAS Number	12039-07-5
3D model (JSmol)	Interactive image
ChemSpider	103867625
PubChem CID	13710724
CompTox Dashboard (EPA)	DTXSID70923373
- InChI: InChI=1S/S.Ti Key: RCYJPSGNXVLIBO-UHFFFAOYSA-N
- SMILES: [S].[Ti]

Properties
Chemical formula	TiS
Molar mass	79.933 g/mol
Appearance	brown hexagonal crystals
Density	3.85 g/cm^{3}, solid
Melting point	1,780 °C (3,240 °F; 2,050 K)
Solubility in water	soluble in concentrated acids
Magnetic susceptibility (χ)	+432.0·10^{−6} cm^{3}/mol

Structure
Crystal structure	Hexagonal (NiAs), hP4
Space group	P6_{3}/mmc, No. 194
- Except where otherwise noted, data are given for materials in their standard state (at 25 °C [77 °F], 100 kPa). verify (what is ?) Infobox references

Titanium(II) sulfide (TiS) is an inorganic chemical compound of titanium and sulfur.

A meteorite, Yamato 691, contains tiny flecks of this compound, making it a new mineral called wassonite.
