= September 1963 =

Month of 1963

| << | September 1963 | | | | | >> |
| Su | Mo | Tu | We | Th | Fr | Sa |
| 1 | 2 | 3 | 4 | 5 | 6 | 7 |
| 8 | 9 | 10 | 11 | 12 | 13 | 14 |
| 15 | 16 | 17 | 18 | 19 | 20 | 21 |
| 22 | 23 | 24 | 25 | 26 | 27 | 28 |
| 29 | 30 |

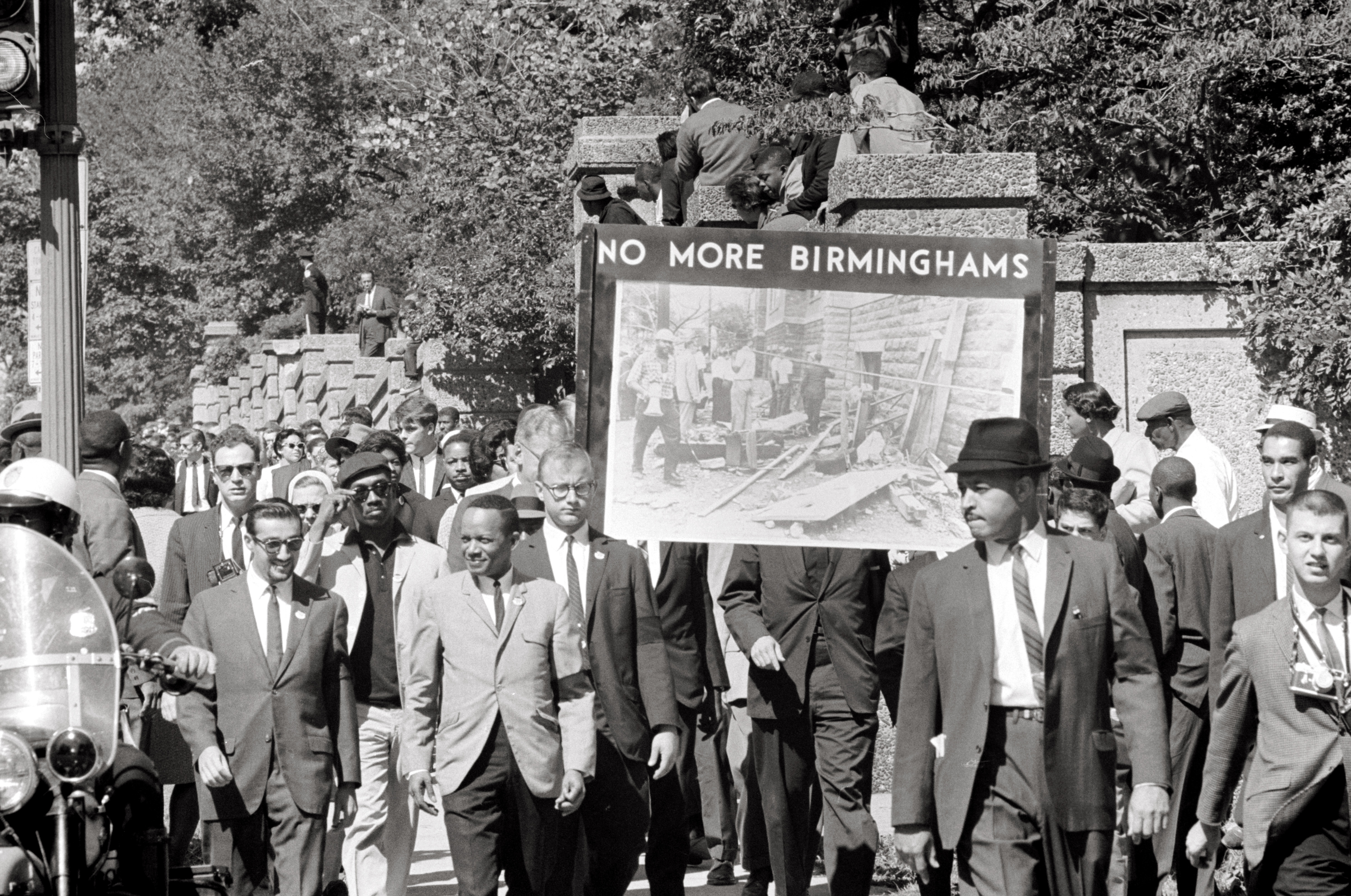
September 15, 1963: Killing of four children at church in Birmingham invokes protests

September 16, 1963: Malaya merges with Singapore, Sabah and North Borneo...

... to create Malaysia

The following events occurred in September 1963:

== September 1, 1963 (Sunday) ==
- An unidentified visitor to Lenin's Mausoleum, in Moscow, entered the shrine with a bomb concealed under his coat, and then detonated the explosive, killing himself and causing an unspecified amount of damage and injuries. The event was not reported in the Soviet press and would not be revealed until after the breakup of the Soviet Union.
- At the annual meeting of the Quebec wing of the Social Credit Party of Canada in Granby, Quebec, delegates voted to form a new party. However, the Ralliement créditiste du Québec would not come into being until 1970.
- The Commonwealth Marriage Act 1961 took full effect in Australia, creating a national law regulating marriage, divorce and domestic relations and superseding individual state laws.
- About 100,000 people in two Japanese cities demonstrated against the presence of American nuclear submarines.
- Kilkenny GAA defeated Waterford GAA in the 1963 All-Ireland Senior Hurling Championship Final at Croke Park, Dublin.
- Australian driver Jack Brabham won the Austrian Grand Prix at Zeltweg Airfield.

== September 2, 1963 (Monday) ==
- U.S. TV presenter Walter Cronkite introduced the first broadcast of CBS Evening News with the statement, "Good evening from our CBS newsroom in New York, on this, the first broadcast of network television's first half-hour news program." The first show was aired at 6:30 p.m. local time and included a pre-recorded segment of Cronkite's interview with U.S. President John F. Kennedy. Previously, the three U.S. networks had run their daily national news for fifteen minutes. NBC would inaugurate its half-hour news program a week later, although ABC would not follow suit until 1967.
- Died: Fazlollah Zahedi, 70, Prime Minister of Iran from 1953 to 1955

== September 3, 1963 (Tuesday) ==
- The United States federal minimum wage was increased to $1.25 an hour ($13.15 in 2025 dollars). Fifty years later, the minimum wage would be $7.25 an hour.
- NASA's Mission Planning Coordination Group was established to review monthly activities in Gemini operations, network guidance and control, and trajectories and orbits, and to ensure the coordination of various Manned Spacecraft Center divisions concerned with Project Gemini mission planning.
- The Gemini Project Office suspended testing of the parachute recovery system until a drogue parachute could be added as a means of stabilizing the spacecraft during the last phase of reentry, at altitudes between 50,000 feet (15,000 m) and 10,000 feet (3,000 m). Testing would resume in January.
- Jin Yong's wuxia novel Demi-Gods and Semi-Devils (天龙八部 (小说)) began its serialisation in the newspapers Ming Pao in Hong Kong and Nanyang Siang Pau in Singapore.
- Died: Louis MacNeice, 55, Irish poet and dramatist, died from pneumonia that developed from bronchitis contracted while caving on the Yorkshire moors

== September 4, 1963 (Wednesday) ==
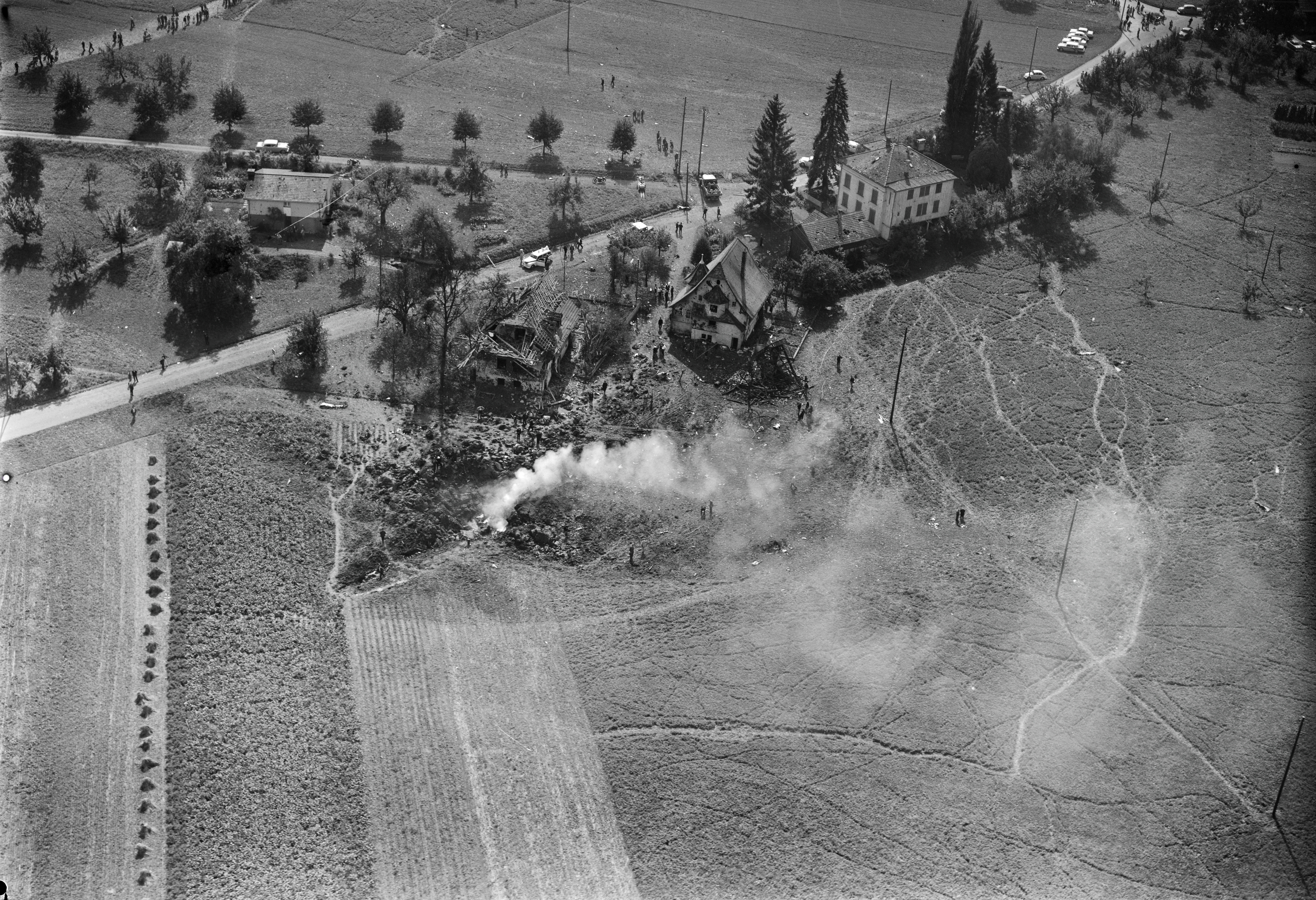
September 4, 1963: The crash site of Swissair 306

- All 80 people aboard Swissair Flight 306, a jet airliner on its way to Rome, were killed when the aircraft crashed shortly after takeoff from Zurich. The plane, a Sud Aviation Caravelle, caught fire and came down near the town of Dürrenäsch. Most of the 44 passengers were from the tiny village of Humlikon, including the town's mayor and its entire city council, all of whom had planned to disembark at Geneva for a visit to an agricultural experiment station.
- For the first time ever, black students registered at white schools in the segregated U.S. state of Alabama; in some places, they faced state troopers deployed by Governor George Wallace to prevent integration. That night, the bombing of a black household in Birmingham triggered a riot, and a black 20-year-old was shot to death by police.
- Sennin Buraku became the first late night anime to be broadcast on Japanese television.
- Died: Robert Schuman, 77, Luxembourg-born French politician who served twice as Prime Minister of France in 1947 and 1948

== September 5, 1963 (Thursday) ==
- British model and showgirl Christine Keeler was arrested for perjury, after witnesses established that she had lied under oath in the criminal trial of Aloysius Gordon in the course of the Profumo affair.

== September 6, 1963 (Friday) ==
- The 100,000th American major league baseball game was played, the milestone having been calculated by baseball historians from the first official game, played on May 4, 1871 by the National Association of Professional Base Ball Players. In game number 100,000 the Washington Senators defeated the visiting Cleveland Indians, 7 to 2. In the 1871 season opener, the Fort Wayne Kekiongas had defeated the visiting Cleveland Forest City team, 2 to 0.
- The U.S. Department of Defense approved the Titan II Augmented Engine Improvement Program. The formal Combined Systems Acceptance Test (CSAT) of the Titan II GLV rocket No. 1 was conducted in the vertical test facility at Martin-Baltimore. and the rocket was presented to the Air Force for final acceptance five days later.
- Professors Daniel Bastian and Hubert Forestier founded the Centre for International Industrial Property Studies (CEIPI) as part of the University of Strasbourg.
- The United States National Security Council launched the Krulak–Mendenhall mission to South Vietnam.
- Born: Mark Chesnutt, American country music singer; in Beaumont, Texas

== September 7, 1963 (Saturday) ==
- The Pro Football Hall of Fame opened in Canton, Ohio, with 17 charter members.

== September 8, 1963 (Sunday) ==
- The 16 Gemini astronaut candidates began training in water and land parachute landing techniques, necessary because in low level abort (under 70,000 feet (21,000 m)) the pilot would be ejected from the Gemini spacecraft and would descend by personnel parachute. In the training, a towed parasail carried each astronaut to as high as 400 feet (120 m) before the towline was released and the astronaut glided to a landing.
- Félix Houphouët-Boigny, President of Côte d'Ivoire, relinquished his additional post of Minister of Foreign Affairs, replacing it with the ministries of Defense, the Interior, and Agriculture.
- Voters in Algeria overwhelmingly approved that nation's first constitution, in a referendum with a 96.8% yes vote.
- Died: Stone Johnson, 23, United States Olympic sprinter and Kansas City Chiefs kick returner and running back, died nine days after having his neck broken while playing a preseason football game on August 30.

== September 9, 1963 (Monday) ==
- NBC became the second U.S. television network to expand its evening news from 15 minutes to 30. As CBS did the week before, The Huntley–Brinkley Report included an interview with President Kennedy.
- U.S. Army General Maxwell D. Taylor, Chairman of the Joint Chiefs of Staff, approved Operation 34A, authorizing American secret operations against North Vietnam.
- The fourth session of the United Nations Committee on the Peaceful Uses of Outer Space opened at United Nations Headquarters in New York.
- Died: Ernst Kantorowicz, 68, German historian

== September 10, 1963 (Tuesday) ==
- For the first time in the history of Major League Baseball, three brothers appeared for the same team in a game. Felipe Alou, Jesús Alou and Matty Alou took the outfield (at right, center and left field, respectively) for the San Francisco Giants against the New York Mets. In the 8th inning, Jesús, Matty and Felipe came up to bat in consecutive order, and were all struck out by Mets pitcher Carl Willey; the Mets won 4–2.
- U.S. President Kennedy issued an executive order that exempted married American men from being drafted.
- Italian Mafia boss Bernardo Provenzano was indicted for murder. Eight days later, he would become a fugitive, and would not be captured until 43 years later, on April 11, 2006.
- Born: Randy Johnson, American baseball player; in Walnut Creek, California

== September 11, 1963 (Wednesday) ==
- Inspection of the Gemini 1 rocket began. The NASA team declared the rocket to be unacceptable because of severely contaminated electrical connectors and a lack of documents showing qualification of a number of major components. Martin engineers inspected all 350 of the electrical connectors and found that more than half (180) required cleaning or replacement.
- The Virginia Supreme Court ruled that a state law, requiring segregated seating in publicly owned ballparks, was unconstitutional.
- An Indian Airlines Viscount turboprop, crashed while en route from Nagpur to New Delhi, killing all 18 people on board.
- Died: Suzanne Duchamp, 73, French Dadaist painter and sister of Marcel Duchamp

== September 12, 1963 (Thursday) ==
- All 36 passengers and four crew of a chartered airliner were killed when the twin-engine VC.1 Viking crashed into a French mountain peak during a thunderstorm. The passengers were all British vacationers who were on their way to the mountain resort town of Perpignan after having departed from London. Shortly after midnight, the aircraft charted from the French company Airnautic, slammed into the 4,800 feet (1,500 m) high Roc de la Rouquette in the French Pyrenees mountains.
- The Ankara Agreement was signed in the capital of Turkey, between representatives of the European Economic Community (EEC) and Turkey, and provided for gradual entrance of Turkey into the European Community.
- Died: Modest Altschuler, 90, Belarusian cellist, orchestral conductor, and composer

== September 13, 1963 (Friday) ==
- The White House confirmed in a press release that U.S. President Kennedy would be making a trip to Dallas, Texas later in the year, though the specific itinerary was not complete. The Dallas Times-Herald reported that Kennedy would have "a breakfast in Dallas, luncheon in Fort Worth, coffee in San Antonio and dinner in Houston."
- Mary Kay Cosmetics was incorporated by a Texas widow, Mary Kay Ash, who invested her life savings of $5,000. By the time of her death in 2001, the company had sales of $1.4 billion.
- Barbra Streisand married for the first time at the age of 21, in a wedding to film actor Elliott Gould; they would divorce in 1971.
- The Glen Canyon Dam, in the U.S. state of Arizona, was "topped out" with the pouring of the last concrete.
- The charter creating the Organisation of African Unity entered into force, after having been signed on May 25.
- Russian dramatist and KGB agent Yuri Krotkov defected to the west while in London.
- Born: Robin Smith, South African-born England cricketer; in Durban
- Died: Eduardo Barrios, 78, Chilean novelist and playwright

== September 14, 1963 (Saturday) ==
- The Tokyo Convention, officially the "Convention on Offences and Certain Other Acts Committed On Board Aircraft", was signed in Japan. Upon ratification by twelve nations, the treaty would enter into force on December 4, 1969.
- Astronomer Zenon M. Pereyra discovered Comet Pereyra, extremely bright with an apparent magnitude of 2, from an observatory near Córdoba, Argentina; it would last be seen from Earth on December 18.
- D. C. Thomson & Co. published the first issue of the magazine The Hornet.
- Born: The Fischer quintuplets (Mary Ann, Mary Catherine, Mary Margaret, Mary Magdalene and James Andrew Fischer), the first American born quintuplets to survive infancy, and only the third in world history; in Aberdeen, South Dakota
- Died: Alvin Boyd Kuhn, 82, American theosophy scholar

== September 15, 1963 (Sunday) ==
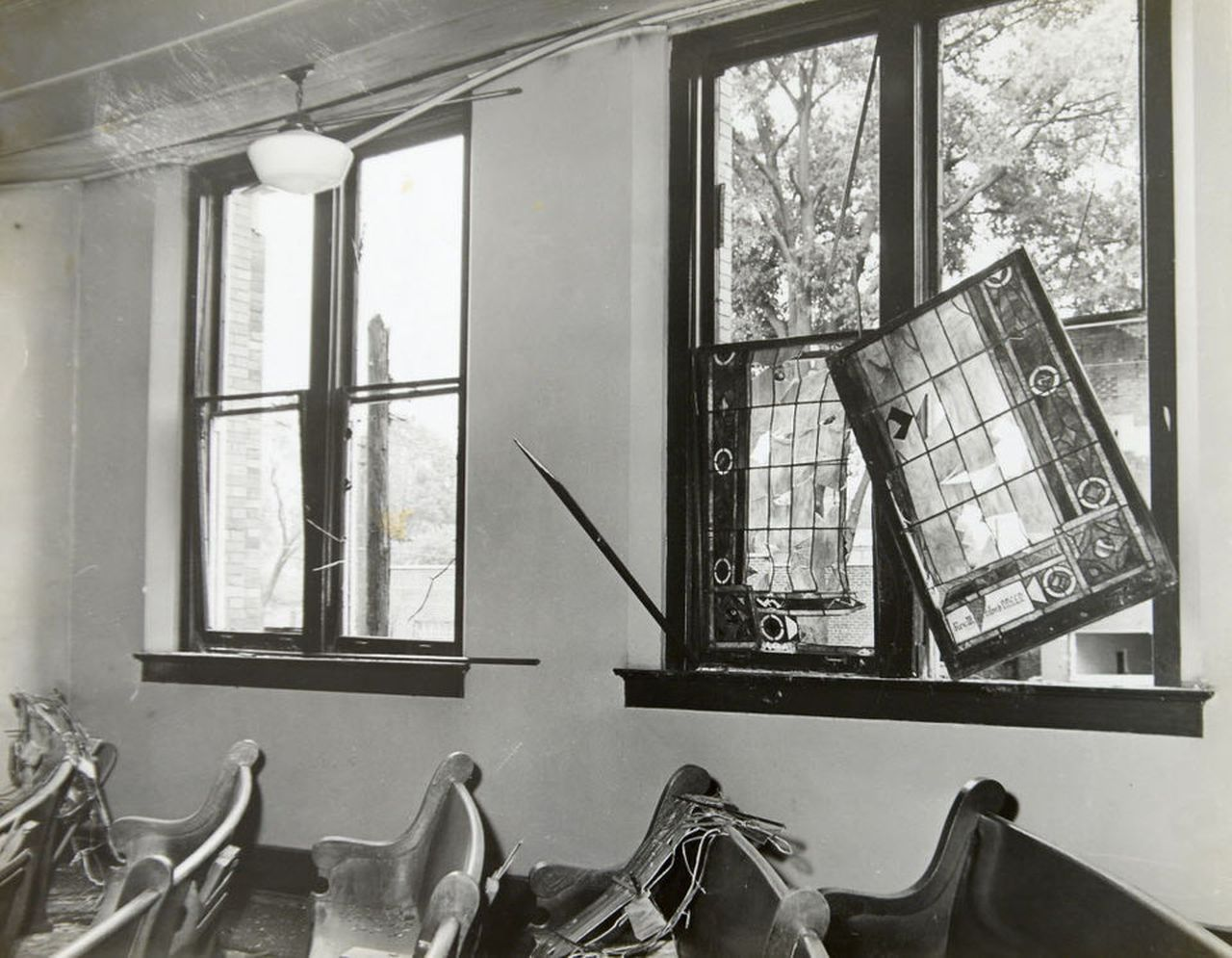
September 15, 1963: Aftermath of the Birmingham bombing

- A time bomb exploded in the basement of the 16th Street Baptist Church in Birmingham, Alabama, killing four African-American girls and injuring 22 other children who were attending a Sunday school class. The blast happened at 10:22 a.m., in a room with 80 children. Denise McNair was 11, and Carole Robertson, Cynthia Wesley and Addie Mae Collins were all 14. Robert Edward Chambliss, a white member of racist United Klans of America who put the bomb together, would finally be convicted of the children's murder on November 18, 1977. Thomas Blanton, Jr., who drove the group to the church, would be tried and convicted in 2001, and Bobby Frank Cherry, who planted the bomb, would finally be convicted of murder on May 22, 2002, almost 39 years after the killing.
- The Beatles and The Rolling Stones performed in the same show for the first and only time, appearing at a concert at Royal Albert Hall in London.
- Ahmed Ben Bella was elected, without opposition, as the first President of Algeria.

== September 16, 1963 (Monday) ==
- Malaysia was formed through the merger of the 11 states of the Federation of Malaya and the British colonies of Singapore, North Borneo (renamed Sabah) and Sarawak.
- The science fiction anthology television show, The Outer Limits, premiered on the ABC television network at 7:30 p.m. in the United States, beginning with the episode "The Galaxy Being".
- In Fort-Lamy, Chad, anti-government demonstrations were quelled with 300 people killed.
- Hurricane Cindy formed 200 miles (322 km) east-northeast of Brownsville, Texas.

== September 17, 1963 (Tuesday) ==
- Near the town of Chualar, California, 32 people died and 25 were injured when their makeshift bus (a flatbed truck with two long benches and a canopy) was struck by a train. The truck was carrying 56 migrant farm workers, mostly from Mexico, and was returning from a celery field at the end of the day. Twenty-two of the men died at the scene, and another 10 died of their injuries later.
- On television, David Janssen made his first appearance in the title role of The Fugitive, portraying Dr. Richard Kimble, a physician who had wrongfully been convicted of murder. Barry Morse portrayed Indiana detective Philip Gerard, whose relentless pursuit of Kimble would end with the series finale on August 29, 1967.
- In Iran's Parliamentary elections, the New Iran Party won 140 of the 200 seats. The party's leader, Hassan Ali Mansur, would become the new Prime Minister.

== September 18, 1963 (Wednesday) ==
- The first flight of the Project ASSET, (Aerothermodynamic-elastic Structural Systems Environmental Tests), a winged space payload vehicle, was carried out to develop a spacecraft which could be launched with astronauts on an orbital mission and then return to landing on a runway. The six-foot tall prototype was sent aloft from Cape Canaveral and sent back results but then sank in the Atlantic Ocean and was not recovered.
- The last sports event at the Polo Grounds stadium in New York City took place, with baseball's New York Mets losing to the Philadelphia Phillies, 5–1, before a crowd of only 1,752 people. When the game ended, the fans ran onto the field, vandalizing the scoreboard and the sod on the field, as well as some of the seats in the stadium, which was scheduled to be torn down in 1964.
- The Patty Duke Show premiered on television, with actress Patty Duke playing two roles as "identical cousins". Camera tricks allowed Duke to appear as both Patty Lane and her look-alike cousin Cathy Lane. One critic commented the next day, "American family life, which has had its arteries tapped gill by gill as fodder for the insatiable appetite of television for more than a decade, received an intravenous feeding last night when the refreshing 'Patty Duke Show' hit the screen in its ABC TV debut," adding that Duke "plays a difficult dual role of look alikes who are cousins, and she does this complicated chore expertly."
- Rioters in Indonesia burned down the British Embassy in Jakarta in protest at the formation of Malaysia.
- Born:
  - Dan Povenmire, American animator, voice actor, and producer known for his work on Disney Channel cartoons; in San Diego, California
  - John Powell, English-American composer, conductor, pianist, and record producer; in London

== September 19, 1963 (Thursday) ==
- At the United Nations, Soviet Foreign Minister Andrei Gromyko announced that the USSR was prepared to negotiate and sign a treaty to prohibit the orbiting of nuclear weapons platforms in outer space. The Outer Space Treaty would be signed in 1967.
- Iota Phi Theta, an African-American collegiate fraternity, was founded with the first chapter organized at Morgan State College. There are now 249 chapters of the fraternity.
- Born: Jarvis Cocker, English musician and frontman of the band Pulp; in Sheffield, West Riding of Yorkshire
- Died:
  - Agnès Humbert, 68, French art historian, ethnographer and Resistance member
  - David Low, 72, New Zealand political cartoonist

== September 20, 1963 (Friday) ==
- At the United Nations, U.S. President John F. Kennedy proposed a joint Moon mission between the U.S. and the Soviet Union. The Soviet Communist Party newspaper Pravda reported the speech but commented that the idea was "premature". Kennedy would die two months later, Soviet Chairman Khrushchev would be deposed within 13 months, and the United States would proceed alone in its lunar program.
- The first successful prenatal blood transfusion in history was performed in New Zealand at the National Women's Hospital at Auckland. Dr. William Liley carried out the transfusion on the unborn son of a woman identified only as "Mrs. E. McLeod" in order to treat the fetus for hemolytic disease. The baby was born later in the day.

== September 21, 1963 (Saturday) ==
- Joe Morgan, a second baseman formerly with the Modesto Colts, made his Major League Baseball debut for the Houston Colt .45s and began a career that would lead to his induction in baseball's Hall of Fame.
- In Singapore's first parliamentary elections since independence, Lee Kuan Yew's People's Action Party, won 37 of 51 seats, beginning its domination of politics in Singapore, winning.
- On the same day, Mario Andretti participated in his first major auto race, competing at Allentown, Pennsylvania in a United States Auto Club event.
- In Canada, the Place des Arts opened in Montreal.

== September 22, 1963 (Sunday) ==
- Viliam Siroky, Prime Minister of Czechoslovakia, was removed from office after 10 years, and replaced by Jozef Lenárt. In what was viewed as a purge of the remaining Stalinists in the Communist Party of Czechoslovakia (KSČ) and government, President and KSČ First Secretary Antonín Novotný cited Siroky's "past political mistakes" as the reason for Siroky's abrupt departure.
- South Korea began its commitment to the Vietnam War, sending the first of 312,853 soldiers who would fight against the North Vietnamese.
- Born: Armando Castagna, Italian speedway rider; in Arzignano
- Died: Arthur Higgins, 71, Australian cinematographer

== September 23, 1963 (Monday) ==
- Haiti and the Dominican Republic, on the west side and east side, respectively, of the Caribbean island of Hispaniola, prepared for war. Dominican president Juan Bosch threatened to drop bombs on the presidential palace of Haiti's Francois Duvalier, after artillery shells rained across the border on the Dominican Republic town of Dajabón. Haiti, in turn, accused the Dominican Republic of firing weapons on the neighboring Haitian town of Ouanaminthe. The nations would later take their grievances to the Organization of American States without going to war.
- The U.S. Department of Defense issued a plan for 22 military research experiments for the Gemini program, with 13 for the U.S. Air Force and nine for the U.S. Navy, at an estimated cost of $22 million. Their inclusion was subject to Manned Spacecraft Center (MSC) review and depended on clarification of weight and volume of experiment equipment.
- A Saudi royal decree established King Fahd University for Petroleum and Minerals as the "College of Petroleum and Minerals".
- Born: Mr. Mixx (stage name for David P. Hobbs), Scratch DJ, music producer, and co-founder of the rap group 2 Live Crew; in Santa Ana, California

== September 24, 1963 (Tuesday) ==
- The U.S. Senate voted 80 to 19 to ratify the Nuclear Test Ban Treaty, 14 more than the two-thirds majority required by the U.S. Constitution. President Kennedy felt that the ratification of the treaty, which would go into effect on October 11, to be the greatest achievement of his presidency, according to aide Theodore Sorensen.
- Yaakov Herzog, a deputy at the Foreign Ministry of Israel, secretly met in London with King Hussein of Jordan, beginning a dialogue between the two neighboring nations that were, officially, enemies. King Hussein had suggested the meeting, explaining later that "One had to break that barrier... whether it led anywhere or not."
- The rural-themed situation comedy Petticoat Junction began a seven season run on CBS television in the U.S., after producer Paul Henning's success with The Beverly Hillbillies. Bea Benaderet, who had portrayed Pearl Bodine mother on the first episode, starred as Kate Bradley, as the operator of a hotel accessible only by train.
- An explosion killed 18 people and seriously injured 12 others at a fireworks factory at the Italian city of Caserta. The factory owner, who was killed in the blast, had reportedly been asking the employees to rush to produce additional fireworks for the festival of Saint Michael the Archangel.

== September 25, 1963 (Wednesday) ==
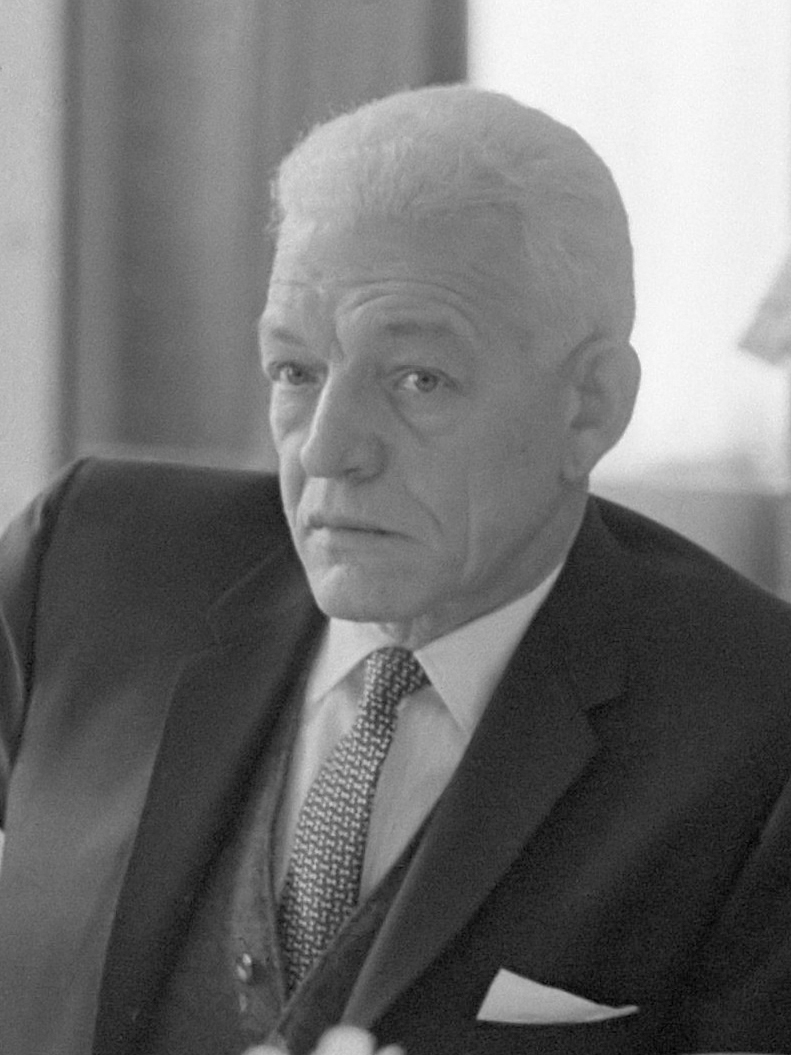
Former President Bosch

- Dominican Republic President Juan Bosch was overthrown in a military coup, only seven months after he had become the nation's first democratically elected leader. Military leaders installed a group of three civilians, headed by Emilio de Los Santos as President, to preside over the nation.

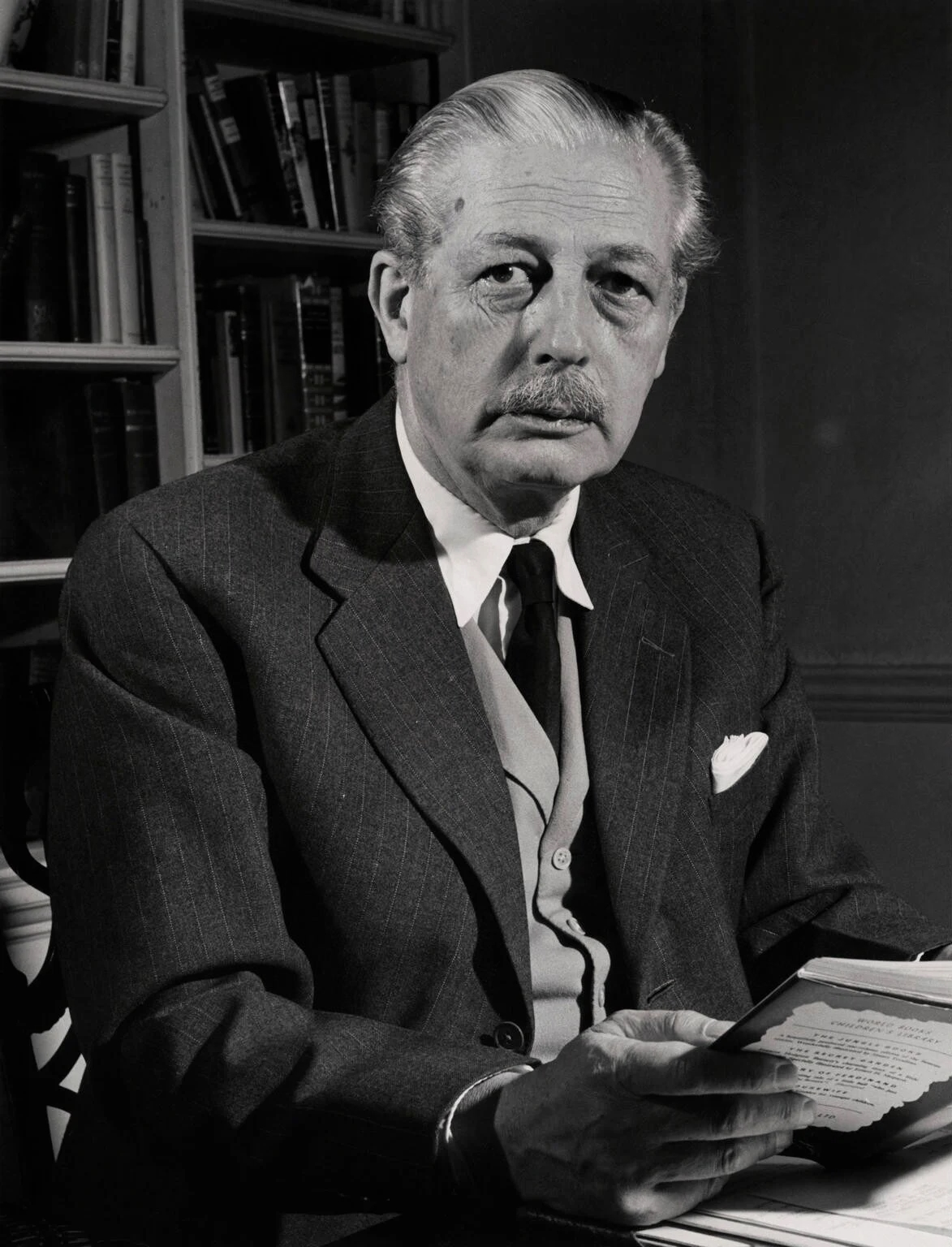
British PM Macmillan

- The Denning Report on the Profumo affair was published in Great Britain. The report concluded that Prime Minister Harold Macmillan, and the rest of his cabinet, had not been aware of the indiscretions of War Minister John Profumo.
- The U.S. House of Representatives voted 271–155 to approve the reduction of the federal income tax rate. The bill would pass the U.S. Senate, and be signed into law on February 26, 1964.
- Einar Gerhardsen was appointed as Prime Minister of Norway for the fourth time, after the resignation of John Lyng. He would serve until October 12, 1965.

== September 26, 1963 (Thursday) ==
- A panicked elephant was chased for 90 minutes through the streets of Lansing, Michigan, after running away from an outdoor circus at a shopping center, injuring one man and causing extensive damage to a department store. "Little Rajjee", a 16-year old elephant, was performing at the King Circus at the parking lot of South Logan Shopping Center when she got loose. Pursued by hundreds of curious people, Rajjee fractured the pelvis of a bystander, and rampaged through a residential south Lansing neighborhood, before crashing through the doors of Arlan's Department Store on Fenton Street. Her handlers had her under control twice, but Rajje was panicked by a mob inside the store and by a burglar alarm before city police shot and killed her.
- A man from Waynesville, North Carolina, crashed his pickup truck through the closed iron gates of the White House, stopping short of hitting the building. The unarmed man, who reportedly demanded to see President Kennedy and shouted that "the Communists are taking over in North Carolina", was taken to a hospital for observation. The President was out at the time.
- After only one day on the FBI's Ten Most Wanted Fugitives list, bank robber Carl Close was arrested by local authorities in Anderson, South Carolina. Close had just robbed a branch of the First National Bank in Anderson, and was stopped by a detective three minutes later while trying to commandeer another car.
- T. S. Eliot's book Collected Poems 1909–1962, selected by the author, was published on his 75th birthday.
- Born: Joe Nemechek, American NASCAR driver and owner; in Lakeland, Florida

== September 27, 1963 (Friday) ==
- The Houston Colt .45s became the first, and only Major League Baseball team in history, to play a regular season game with a team composed entirely of rookies. They were hosting the New York Mets, and lost, 10–3. The lineup included Joe Morgan, Jimmy Wynn and Rusty Staub, each of whom would score more than 250 home runs in their careers, and Aaron Pointer (brother of the singing group The Pointer Sisters). The Colts' pitcher was 17-year-old Jay Dahl, appearing in his first and only major league game; Dahl would die in an auto accident in 1965.
- Lee Harvey Oswald arrived in Mexico City and went to the consulate of Cuba, where he applied for a transit visa in an attempt to travel to Cuba and then back to the Soviet Union, where he had lived from 1959 to 1962. The Warren Commission would later conclude that Oswald, after being refused visas by the Cuban consulate and the Soviet embassy, returned to his home near Dallas.
- North American Aviation inspected the Gemini tow test vehicle (TTV) for the Paraglider Landing System Program, and its team set 24 modifications. At the same time, North American stopped its retrofit of the full-scale test vehicle (FSTV) to the Gemini prototype paraglider deployment hardware.
- Electro-Mechanical Research successfully tested the compatibility of airborne and ground station PCM (pulse code modulated) telemetry equipment for Project Gemini.
- Parliamentary elections were held in South Vietnam. No political parties were represented, and all 123 seats were filled by independents.
- The Scout X-2B rocket was launched from Point Arguello, California, carrying weather satellites, but failed to achieve orbit.
- Born: Caren Metschuck, German Olympic champion swimmer; in Greifswald

== September 28, 1963 (Saturday) ==
- Jim Morrison, a 19-year-old student at Florida State University and future founder of the rock group The Doors, was arrested for the first of six times, after he and his friends stole items from a Tallahassee Police Department cruiser. Morrison spent a night in jail, then paid a fifty dollar fine and continued his studies at FSU.

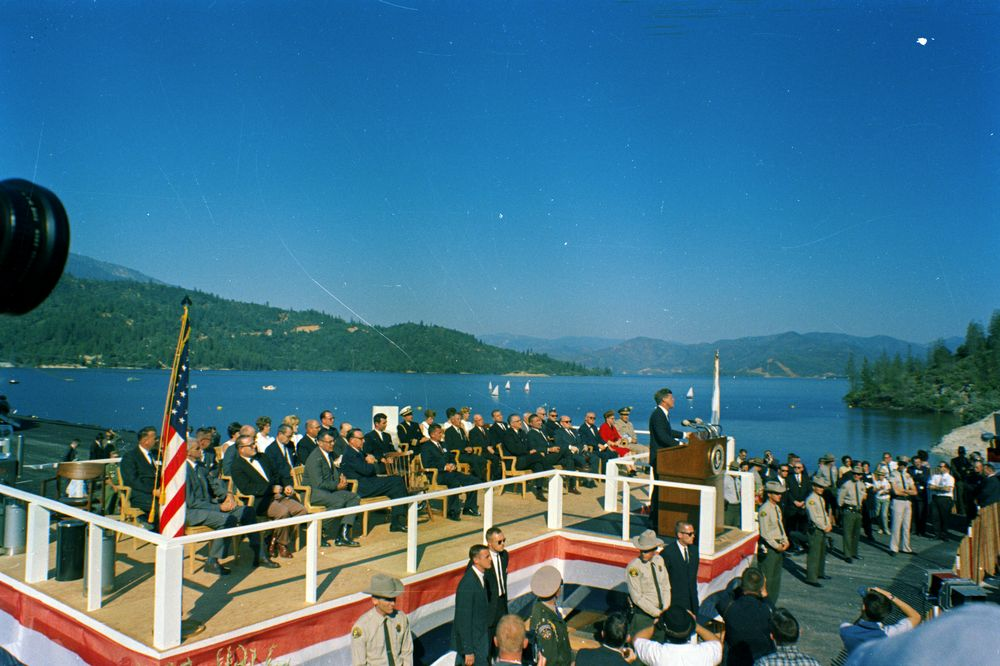
John F. Kennedy's speech at the Inauguration of the Whiskeytown Dam

- The Whiskeytown Dam in Shasta County, California was inaugurated by U.S. President John F. Kennedy.
- Born:
  - Luis Arce, Bolivian banker, economist, and politician serving as the 67th president of Bolivia since 2020; in La Paz
  - Wei Wei, Chinese mandopop singer and diva; in Kweisui, Inner Mongolia Autonomous Region (now Hohhot, China)

== September 29, 1963 (Sunday) ==
- Joseph Kasavubu, the President of the Republic of the Congo (the former Belgian Congo, colloquially referred to as "Congo-Léopoldville"), dissolved that nation's parliament for the second time in less than four years, so that he and his allies could rule by decree.
- Chilean sport diver Crisologo Urizar Contreras was attacked and killed by a large shark (probably a great white shark) at Bahía el Panul, south of Coquimbo, Chile. Urizar's remains were never recovered, although his damaged wetsuit jacket washed ashore.
- My Favorite Martian, an American television sitcom and science fiction fantasy starring Ray Walston and Bill Bixby, premiered on CBS.
- The second period of the Second Vatican Council ("Vatican II") opened in Rome.
- Stylianos Mavromichalis replaced Panagiotis Pipinelis as Prime Minister of Greece.
- The University of East Anglia was established in the United Kingdom at Norwich.

== September 30, 1963 (Monday) ==
- The Pantone Color Matching System, developed in the United States, was introduced and would become "a de facto international colour standard" for printing companies around the world.
- The U.S. Air Force contracted with Aerojet-General to develop a backup for the Titan II Gemini rocket's second stage engine injectors, after development flights showed that the engine had combustion instability. The redesign took 18 months.
- On the same day, Manned Spacecraft Center awarded its first incentive-type contract to Ling-Temco-Vought, Inc. (LTV), set for making a trainer to be used in the Gemini launch vehicle training program. The fixed-price-incentive-fee was $105,000.
