= Wassonite =

General
- Category: Sulfide mineral
- Formula: TiS
- IMA symbol: Was
- Crystal system: Trigonal
- Crystal class: Hexagonal scalenohedral (3̅m); H-M symbol: (3̅ 2/m)
- Space group: R3̅m

Identification

Wassonite is a scarce titanium sulfide mineral with the chemical formula TiS. Its discovery was announced in a 2011 NASA press release as a single small grain within an enstatite chondrite meteorite called "Yamato 691", which was found during a 1969 Japanese expedition to Antarctica. This grain represents the first observation in nature of the synthetic compound titanium(II) sulfide.

The mineral was named after John T. Wasson, a professor at the University of California, Los Angeles and was approved by the International Mineralogical Association.
