= Murder of Diane Maxwell =

1969 murder in Texas, US

The 1969 murder of Diane Maxwell involved the death of Diane Maxwell, a 25-year-old phone operator for Southwestern Bell, who was found raped and killed in a shack in December 1969 in Houston, Texas.

== Crime ==
On December 14, 1969, 25-year-old Diane Maxwell (b. 1944) was walking to her job as a phone operator for Southwestern Bell, but never made it to the building. Later that day, a man by the name of William Bell noticed a man walking away from a shack. When Bell came to look in the shack, he found the injured body of Maxwell and immediately notified police.

However, the case remained unsolved due to the lack of computer technology. In 1986, 17 years after the incident, investigators reopened the case, but could not solve it. The case remained closed until July 2003, 33 years after the murder was committed. A batch of forensics they had performed in 1969 was found by Houston police, who located James Ray Davis, a lifetime criminal. Davis was last convicted of kidnapping a young girl and was suspected to be the perpetrator of the Maxwell rape and murder. DNA evidence confirmed that he did rape her. Davis was convicted of murder with malice and was sentenced to life in prison.

James Ray Davis died in prison three years after being convicted in 2007.

== Media ==
In 2008, the case was featured in the Forensic Files episode "Brotherly Love".
