= Yamato 691 =

Meteorite found in Antarctica

- Type: Chondrite
- Class: Enstatite chondrite
- Composition: Pl (An32-75), En-99.2, Wo-0.3, tro., nini., oldh., perr., schr., metal (2.2–2.5% Ni, 0.16–0.22% CO)
- Country: Antarctica
- Region: Queen Fabiola Mountains (Yamato Mountains)
- Coordinates: 71°50′S 36°15′E
- Observed fall: No
- Fall date: 4.5 billion years ago
- Found date: December 21, 1969
- TKW: 715 grams (1.576 lb)

The Yamato 691 (abbreviated Y-691) is a 4.5 billion year old chondrite meteorite discovered by members of the Japanese Antarctic Research Expedition on the blue ice field of the Queen Fabiola Mountains (Yamato Mountains) in Antarctica, on December 21, 1969.

== History ==
Yamato 691 was one among 9 meteorite specimens identified by the Japanese Expedition Team in 1969. It was later studied at the Max Planck Institute for Chemistry, Mainz, Germany.

In April 2011, NASA and co-researchers from the United States, South Korea and Japan have found a new mineral named "Wassonite" in Yamato 691.

== Composition and classification ==
This meteorite is a stony enstatite chondrite. Minerals reported from the meteorite include:

- Troilite
- Spinel
- Augite
- Diopside
- Enstatite
- Pigeonite
- Albite
- Nepheline
- Iron
- Olivine
- Wassonite – discovered in April, 2011

== See also ==
- Glossary of meteoritics
