= Bunburra Rockhole (meteorite) =

Meteorite found in South Australia

Bunburra Rockhole is an anomalous basaltic achondritic meteorite. Originally classified as a eucrite, it was thought to belong to a group of meteorites that originated from the asteroid 4 Vesta, but has since been reclassified based on oxygen and chromium isotopic compositions. It was observed to fall on July 21, 2007, 04:43:56 local time, by the Desert Fireball Network (DFN). Two fragments weighing 150g and 174g were recovered by the DFN at 31°21.0′S, 129°11.4′E in the Nullarbor Desert region, South Australia in November of the same year. This is the first meteorite to be recovered using the Desert Fireball Network observatory.

== Petrography and composition ==
Bunburra rockhole is described as a basaltic monomict breccia, which is composed of three different lithologies that can be distinguished by their grain sizes. There is no evidence of weathering, and very few shock features are present. The majority of the meteorite is subophitic in texture.

Primary mineralogy:

- Orthopyroxene, Fs_{62.5}Wo_{3.6}, ~ 1mm in size.
- Plagioclase, An_{84.1}to An_{88.2,} ~ 1mm in size.
- Augite, Fs_{27.7}Wo_{43.0,} as lamella within pyroxene.

== Petrogenesis and origin ==
Oxygen Isotope analyses have contributed to the classification of meteorites and identification of potential origins. Typically, meteorites of a particular classification will exhibit similar oxygen isotope signatures that are often distinct from meteorites that have originated from other planetary bodies. Equilibrated asteroids, planets and moons are predicted to produce meteorites with distinctive oxygen isotope signatures based on the composition and environment of the planetary body. Bunburra Rockhole exhibits a range of oxygen isotope signatures that vary as a function of the three different lithological subtypes present. This indicates that the parent body of the sample may not have been fully equilibrated at the time of crystallization of the meteorite components in this sample.

The oxygen and chromium isotope results from Bunburra Rockhole are quite different to the bulk of the HED meteorite clan. Recently published Cr and O isotope data suggest that Bunburra Rockhole is isotopically similar to Asuka 881394; another outlier of the HED group. Such outliers also exhibit differences in minor element ratios to the HED clan. However, the mineralogy and composition of the Bunburra Rockhole imply it did originate from a differentiated, V-type asteroid, but not from 4-Vesta.

=== Differentiated asteroid ===
This type of brecciated achondrite is similar to terrestrial igneous rocks and has undergone igneous processing on a differentiated parent body. Bunburra Rockhole likely came from a differentiated body smaller than 4-Vesta, as this would have resulted in faster cooling and perhaps incomplete differentiation. The differences in oxygen and chromium isotopes and variable trace element compositions relative to the bulk HED measurements are consistent and supportive of this hypothesis. This rock, along with other meteorites close in composition and texture to HEDs, are evidence that there may have been a large number of differentiated bodies once present in the Solar System, and that the igneous processing and activity on those bodies was rather complex.

== Orbital data ==
Bunburra Rockhole was observed to fall using the Desert Fireball Network observatory in Australia. It was found to have an Aten-type orbit. Upon examination of the rock's recent orbital history, it was found to have been ~ 0.04AU from Venus in September 2001. Modelling to understand the evolution of the object's orbit revealed a 98% probability that the object came from the inner region of the main asteroid belt.
