= Dingle Dell =

Dingle Dell may refer to:

- Dingle Dell meteorite, a meteorite that fell in Western Australia in 2016
- Dingle Dell (St Heliers), a park in St Heliers, Auckland, New Zealand
