= Dingley Dell =

Dingley Dell may refer to:

== Places ==
- Dingley Dell Conservation Park, South Australia, Australia
  - Dingley Dell Museum, home of Adam Lindsay Gordon (1833–1870)
- Dingley Dell (dwelling), a heritage-listed house in Robe, South Australia, Australia
- Dingley Dell, Queensland, a neighbourhood in Camboon, Queensland, Australia

== Other uses ==
- Dingley Dell, a fictional place in The Pickwick Papers
- Dingley Dell F.C., an association football club in London in the late 1850s/early 1860s

== See also ==
- Dingly Dell, a 1972 album by Lindisfarne
- Dingle Dell meteorite
- Dingle Dell (St Heliers), reserve in Auckland, New Zealand
- Dingle Dell, a section of the Brands Hatch motor racing circuit
