= Murrili meteorite =

Meteorite found in South Australia

Murrili
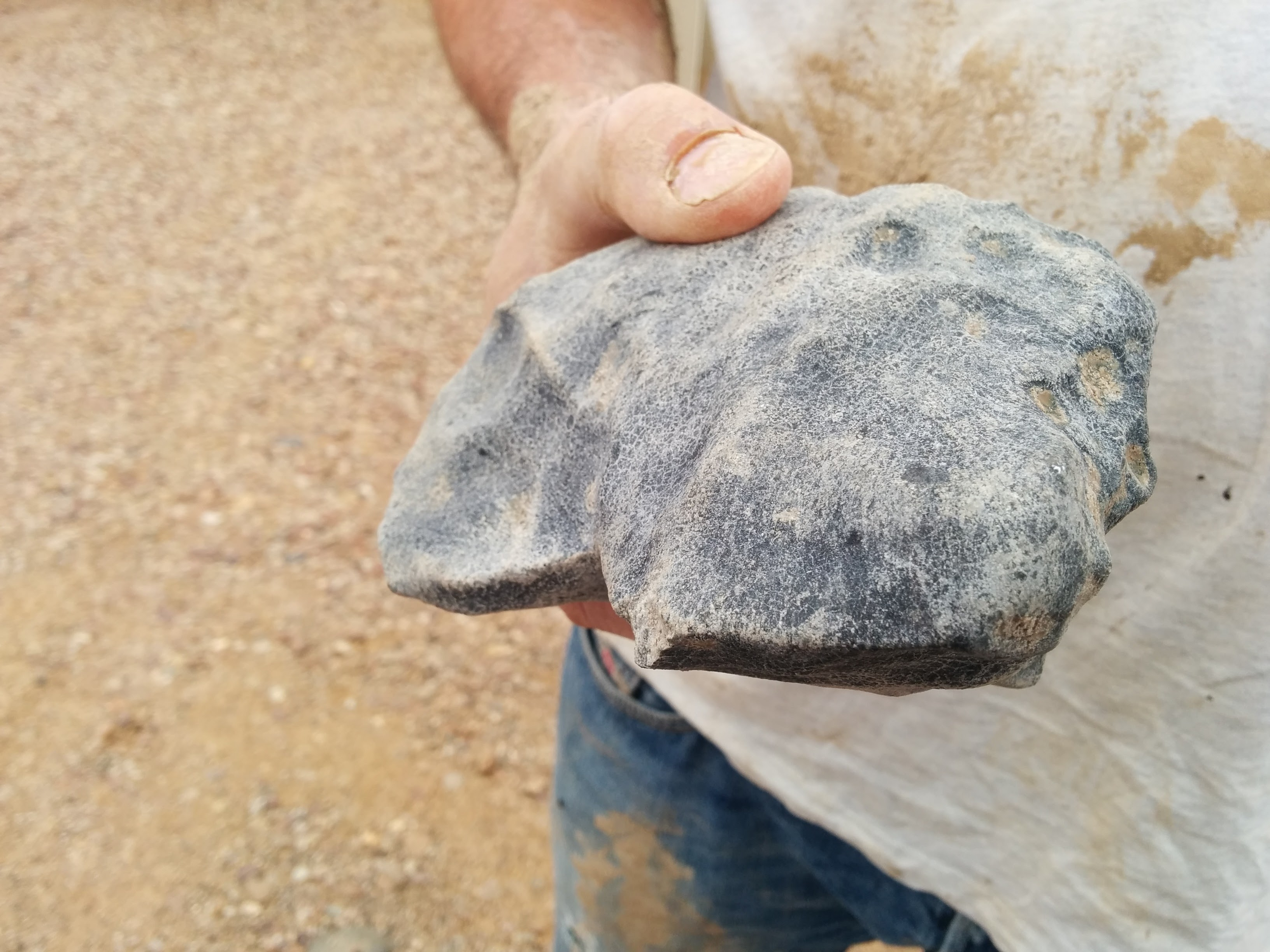
- Type: Ordinary chondrite
- Class: H5
- Composition: Olivine (32%); orthopyroxene (32%); plagioclase (7%), metal and Fe-oxides (10%); sulfides (6.5%); phosphate and chromite (< 1%).
- Shock stage: S1
- Country: Australia
- Region: Lake Eyre, Far North region
- Coordinates: 29.2609°S 137.5376°E
- Observed fall: Yes
- Fall date: 27 November 2015 at 9:15pm local time
- Found date: 31 December 2015
- Strewn field: No

Murrilli (Moo-da-lee) is an ordinary chondrite of subclass type H5. It is the third meteorite to be recovered using the Australia Desert Fireball Network (DFN) camera observatory. It was observed to fall on 27 November 2015 at 9:15pm local time (10:43:44.50 UTC) in South Australia, and recovered by the DFN team on 31 December 2015 from Lake Eyre. As this region is a salt lake, the 1.68 kg rock punched a hole through the ground and was found 0.43 m below the surface. It was recovered 218m from the predicted fall line location.

The Arabana people are the traditional custodians of this land, and recovery of this rock would not have been possible without their permission and assistance. After an aerial search two weeks after the recorded fall, ground-based teams, assisted by the two Arabana people, pinpointed the location and subsequently recovered the rock from the salt lake, prior to rain washing away the impact hole.

== Physical properties and composition ==
The Murrili meteorite fell as a single 1.68 kg heart-shaped rock, with approximate dimensions of 13 × 7 × 6 cm. It was entirely covered in a matte fusion crust, with one broken corner showing the light grey interior of the meteorite. Two wedge-shaped sections were cut from the rock for further study and are currently kept at Curtin University, Western Australia. The rock is relatively weathered due to the terrestrial environment of the fall location, which presents as heterogeneous rusty staining. It is classified as an S1, based upon the very few shock features that are present in the rock.

Murrili is classified as an H5 ordinary chondrite. It contains a high siderophile element component, some well-defined Chondrules, some of which contain barred olivine, and large, single-mineral crystal clasts. It is also classed as a type 5, as it shows moderate amounts of thermal metamorphism which has caused secondary mineral growth and chemical homogenization.

Mineral	Composition (electron microprobe)
Olivine	Fa_{18.8}
Orthopyroxene	Fs_{16.4}Wo_{1.1}
Chromite	(Fe/Fe+Mg = 0.851; Cr/Cr+Al = 0.859)

Bulk density of the rock is 3.47 g/cm^{3}, whereas grain density is 3.59 g/cm^{3}. This implies a porosity of 3.4%. This is markedly low for an H chondrite, but it is consistent with relatively weathered meteorites, as secondary weathering materials fill the pores we would expect to see in an unweathered H chondrite

== Meteorite fall, recovery and orbital characteristics ==
The 6.1 second fall of the Murrili meteorite was recorded by five Desert Fireball Network cameras. The rock entered the Earth's atmosphere at 13.82 km/s, and slowed to a speed of 3.83 km/s over 72 km, at an altitude of 18.34 km. The fall in dark flight was modeled using the WRF climate model to determine the final fall location

The meteorite fell on Kati Thanda–Lake Eyre in the Far North region of South Australia, leaving a visible impact structure, that was observed by DFN searchers from a light aircraft, prior to a ground expedition to recover the meteorite.

Orbital elements:

- Semimajor axis (a) = 2.62 AU
- Eccentricity (e) = 0.62
- Inclination (i) = 3.58 deg
- Argument of periapsis (ω) = 356.3 deg
- Longitude of the ascending node (Ω) = 64.63 deg
- True anomaly (ν) = 3.2
- Perihelion (q) = 0.9944 AU
- Aphelion (Q) = 4.3 AU
