= Desert Fireball Network =

Australian network of meteoroid tracking cameras

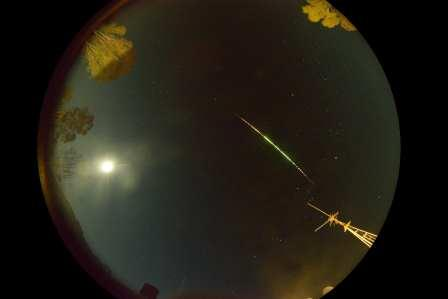
- A meteoroid flashes across the sky
- Abbreviation: DFN
- Type: camera network
- Headquarters: Perth
- Region served: Australia
- Affiliations: Curtin University
- Website: dfn.gfo.rocks

The Desert Fireball Network (DFN) is a network of cameras in Australia. It is designed to track meteoroids entering the atmosphere, and aid in recovering meteorites. It currently operates 50 autonomous cameras, spread across Western Australia and South Australia, including Nullarbor Plain, Western Australian wheatbelt and South Australian desert, covering an area of 2.5 million km^{2}. The locations of the stations were chosen to facilitate meteorite searching. Starting in 2018, cameras deployed across the world began the first global fireball observatory in association with partner research teams.

The DFN observatories capture approximately 30-second exposures of the sky from dusk until dawn every night, and the DFN team is automatically alerted if a fireball or meteor is detected. Based on the long-exposure images, trajectories and orbits are plotted in a semi-automated manner, and a fall-line is generated to indicate the whereabouts and mass of any resultant meteorites on the ground.

== DFN mission ==
The DFN is advancing the knowledge base of the current understanding of planetary system formation and evolution. By connecting a specific meteorite with a fireball trajectory and orbit leading up to impact on Earth, scientists can obtain a better understanding of where meteorite samples came from in the Solar System. Once a likely region of origin in the main asteroid belt is identified, candidate parent bodies can be explored.

When the meteorite is found and collected, a myriad of analyses can take place that show what conditions were like on the parent body and what has happened to the rock over its lifetime. This means a detailed compositional map of the Solar System can be built, which shows how asteroid and near-Earth objects vary in composition and can better inform Solar System evolution models and planetary science research.

The ultimate aim for this project is to find a cometary meteorite. Comets are some of the most pristine materials in the Solar System, and contain a unique record of early Solar System processes. There is growing evidence to suggest that cometary fireballs are delivering meteorites to Earth, and so the setup of this project is ideal to observe the fall and collect any cometary samples, which space agencies around the world have spent a huge sum of money to obtain through space missions.

== History ==
A number of teams have put together fireball observatories based on the same principles, e.g. the Prairie Network (US) and the Canadian Meteorite Observation and Recovery Network, which were led primarily by observational astronomers, and yet collectively have only determined orbits for four meteorites.

The interest in this approach heightened in 2008 when a telescopic astronomical sky survey detected a meteoroid on an Earth-bound trajectory, and successfully pinpointed its location on the Earth's surface. A connection between the candidate asteroid type and the meteorite was made based on the object's composition and orbit, but such observatories only see a small portion of the sky, and so the likelihood of observing such events regularly is somewhat low.

Prior to this in 2007, the DFN was in its analogue trial phase in the Nullarbor desert plains of Western Australia. As soon as the network was running, meteors were being observed, and on the first recovery trip, and on the very first day, the meteorite was found only 100 m from the predicted fall line. In part, the rapid success the DFN enjoyed relates to the location of the network- desert locations are far more favorable for recovery, as regions of dense vegetation, such as the temperate regions of the northern hemisphere, make meteorite recovery almost impossible. Subsequent to the trial phase and recovery of two meteorites during this time, the DFN expanded into an automated digital fireball observatory, which is now expanding further to new regions of Australia and overseas. So far, four meteorites have been recovered with a high-accuracy trajectory and orbit defined.

== Science of fireball tracking ==
=== What can be learned from meteorites ===
Meteorites are metallic or stony objects that fall to the Earth's surface from outer space. Scientists believe that most meteorites originate from asteroids within the asteroid belt of the Solar System, but there is an increasing amount of evidence to suggest some may come from comets. Some meteorites also come from larger planetary bodies, such as the Moon and Mars. Meteorites typically preserve their histories from the time when they were first accreted on their parent body, to when they were ejected from that body and landed on Earth, so our understanding of planetary body formation and evolution over the last 4.56 billion years becomes better each time a new meteorite is found.

The meteorite fall that is observed using the DFN observatory helps to inform how a body interacts with the Earth's atmosphere, how it decelerates, how bright the meteor is depending on the object, and the changes in mass whilst it falls due to ablation.

A large number of analytical tests allow scientists to examine the meteorites and delve into their complex histories. The composition, texture and components of a meteorite help to identify the meteorite class it belongs to. Over time, the global meteorite collections have been used to identify groups of rocks with similar characteristics, which are presumed to originate from the same parent body, or same family of bodies. Subtle differences within these groups hint at variations on the parent body- be those compositional or textural- which implies the suspected parent body may not be uniform, perhaps in a similar way to Earth. Iron meteorites are interpreted to be the core of large asteroids that may no longer exist in the Solar System. They may once have been surrounded by a silicate shell on the parent body, implying that other silicate-rich meteorites originated from the same parent body too, despite the clear compositional differences. This means the processes occurring deep within asteroids can be learned fairly easily, and knowledge about the composition of the inner core of Earth can be based on these rocks.

Highly primitive meteorites contain some of the first solids to have formed in the Solar System. These materials have been used to date a more precise age of the Solar System (4.568 billion years). These rocks are primitive because they have changed very little since their initial formation.

Impact science also benefits from the delivery of meteorites. The Earth has been struck by large impacts in its past e.g. Chicxulub crater, and the materials left behind and the effect on the ground improves impact modeling predictions. The effects on Earth can also be used to understand similar patterns that have been observed on other planets, creating a wealth of understanding of impact cratering on different planets and planetary bodies.

=== Meteorite recoveries ===
The DFN has recovered five meteorites with highly accurate trajectory and orbital data so far. The two more recent recoveries, Murrili and Dingle Dell, were collected within a very short timeframe following the observed fall, meaning the digital progression of the network pipeline is becoming more and more effective as time progresses.

Meteorite name	Fall observation date	Country	State, province, or region	Classification	Instrumentally observed - orbital data	Meteoritical Bulletin(s), other references
Bunburra Rockhole	July 21, 2007	Australia	South Australia	Brecciated achondrite	Yes	
Mason Gully	April 13, 2010	Australia	Western Australia	H5	Yes	
Murrili	November 27, 2015	Australia	South Australia	H5	Yes	
Dingle Dell	October 31, 2016	Australia	Western Australia	L/LL5	Yes	
Arpu Kuilpu	June 1, 2019	Australia	South Australia	H5	Yes	
Puli Ilkaringguru	November 18, 2019	Australia	Western Australia	H5	Yes	
Madura Cave	June 19, 2020	Australia	Western Australia	L5	Yes	
Kybo-Lintos	April 1, 2021	Australia	Western Australia	H4/5	Yes	

== Camera hardware ==
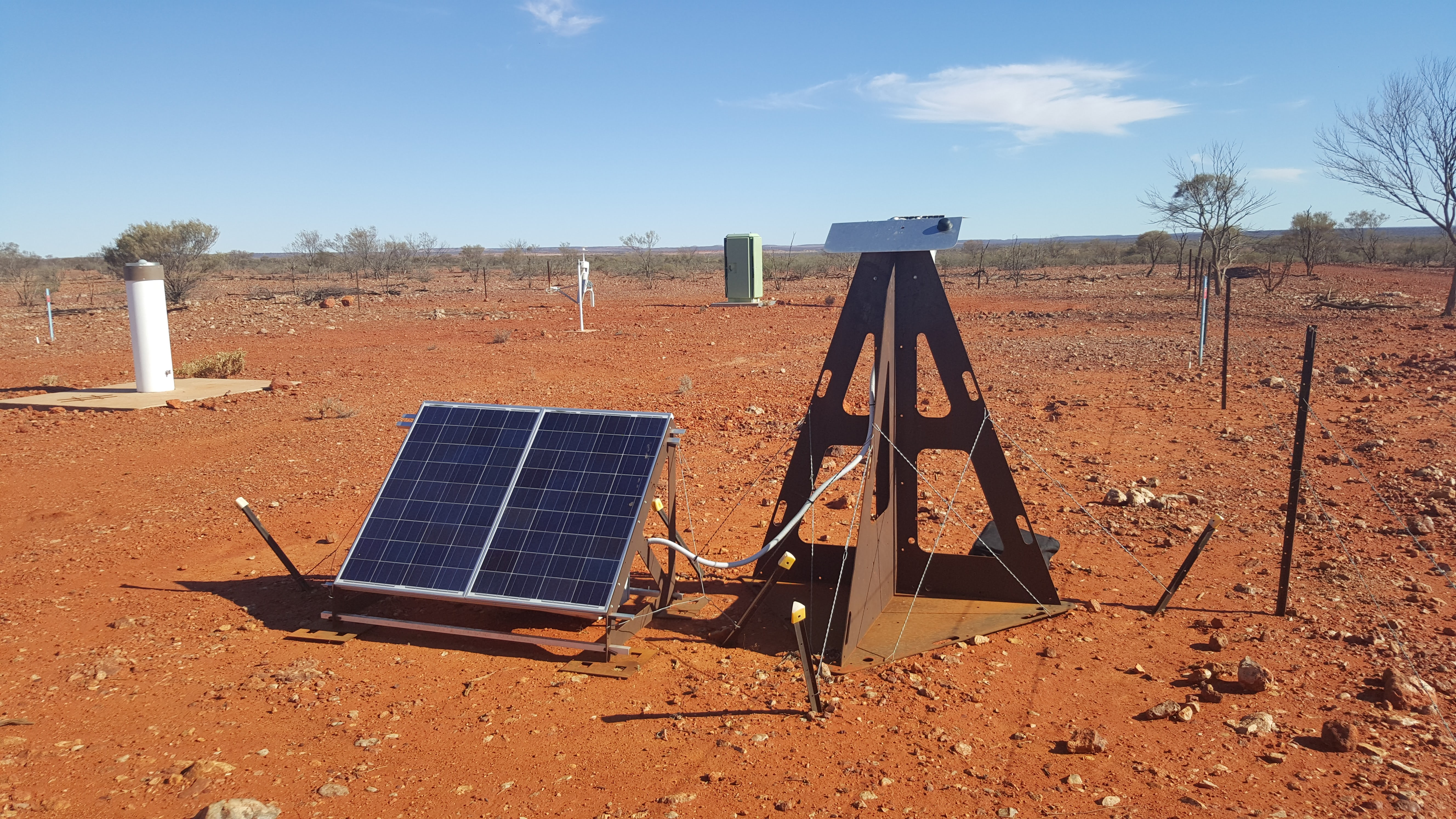
Lambina DFN Station: a typical outback fireball observatory (with some unrelated equipment in the background)

The DFN observatories use consumer still photographic cameras (specifically DSLRs) with 8mm stereographic fish-eye lenses covering nearly the entire sky from each station. The cameras are controlled via an embedded Linux PC using gPhoto2 and images are archived to multiple hard disk drives for storage until the observatories are visited for maintenance (every 8–18 months depending on the storage capacity).

The observatories take one long exposure image every 30 seconds for the entire night. After capture, automated event detection searches the images for fireballs, and events are corroborated on the central server using images from multiple stations.

A GNSS synchronised time code is embedded in the long exposure images by the operation of a liquid crystal (LC) shutter to provide absolute timing data for fireball trajectories after triangulation with temporal precision better than one millisecond. Absolute timing is used for the calculation of meteoroid orbits and the relative timing also embedded by the timecode is required for trajectory analysis (specifically to calculate the mass from the deceleration of the meteoroid).

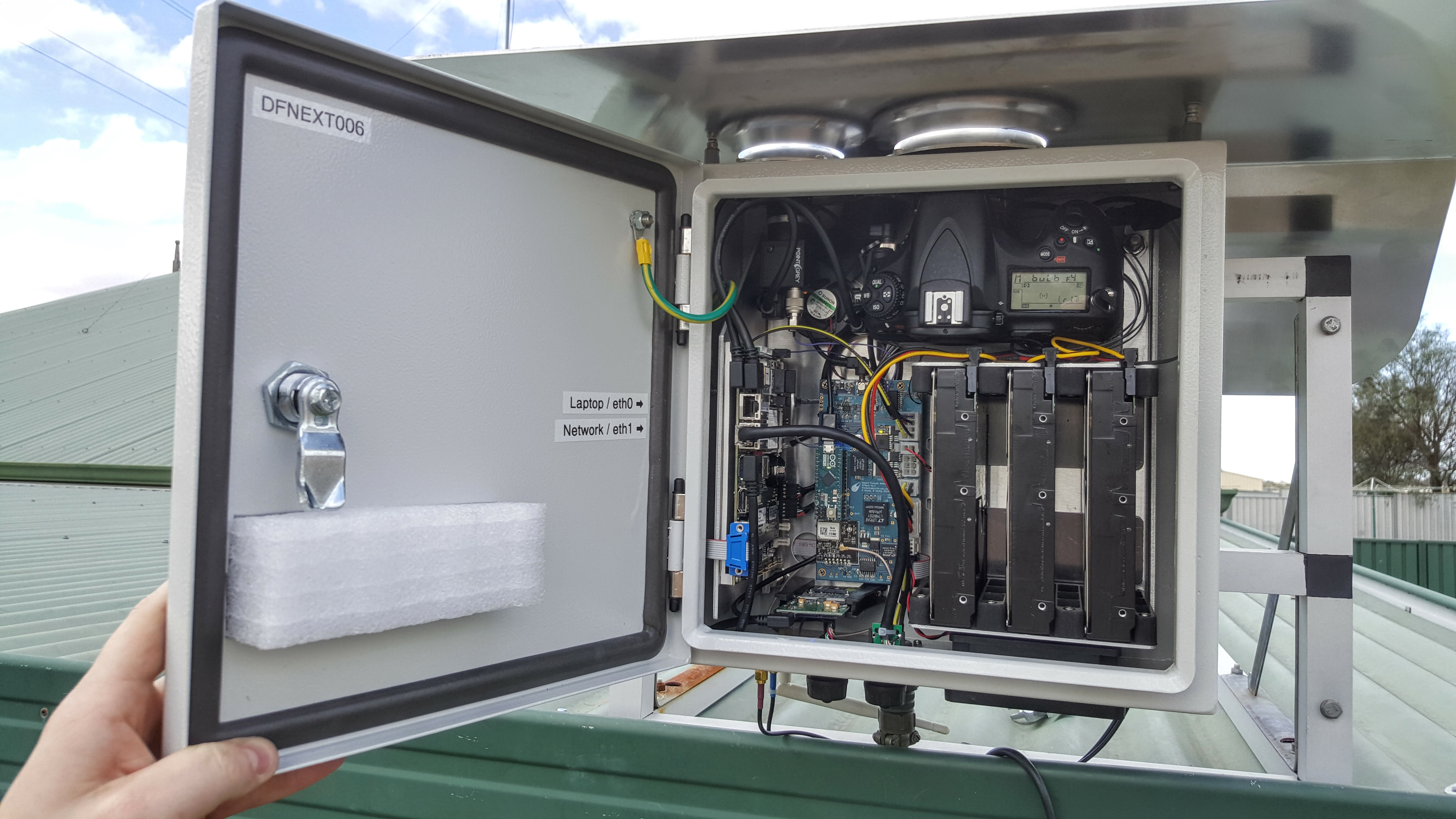
Internals of the latest iteration of the DFN observatory design (as of August 2017) displaying cameras, storage, power management circuit board and embedded PC.

== Data processing pipeline ==
The rate of data acquisition requires an automated digital pipeline for data reduction. A wireless link to each automated fireball observatory allows a cross-check for multi station confirmation and enables images to be remotely downloaded. Software has been created to facilitate the location of fireball trajectories in pixel coordinates. These are converted to celestial coordinates, to a minute of arc precision, by using a powerful astrometric calibration tool created to automatically identify surrounding stars, and use them as a referencing system. The different observation angles are triangulated using a modified least squares minimisation approach, which now includes weightings based on image quality to produce the full observed trajectory . A shutter system within the lens of each observatory encodes a unique non-repeating De Bruijn sequence into each fireball. This provides accurate, absolute timing information for the duration of the trajectory to 0.4 ms. Purpose written software uses entry parameters to determine orbits for each meteoroid. In order to determine if there will be a potential meteorite, the estimation of the changing meteoroid mass is modeled. Once ablation stops, the atmospheric winds strongly affect a meteoroid's path to the ground. Data from the Global Forecasting System is used in an atmospheric wind model with a 0.008 degree resolution mesh uniquely created around the area of the fireball. A Monte Carlo dark flight simulation is performed to determine a likely search area for main mass and fragments.

=== Weather modeling ===
The dark flight trajectory of a meteoroid is significantly affected by the atmospheric winds, especially by the jet stream. As a result, the meteorite fall position can be shifted by up to several kilometers compared to a scenario with no winds.

The weather situation in the area around the end of the luminous flight is numerically modeled using the third generation of Weather Research and Forecasting (WRF) Model with dynamic solver ARW (Advanced Research WRF). The weather model is typically initialized using global one-degree-resolution National Centers for Environmental Prediction (NCEP) Final (FNL) Operational Model Global Tropospheric Analysis data. The model produces 3D matrix for given area and time, with horizontal resolution down to 1 km. From this 3D data, weather profiles are extracted; the components include wind speed, wind direction, pressure, temperature and relative humidity at heights ranging up to about 30 km altitude, in most cases fully covering the dark flight.

=== High volume data handling and archiving ===
The DFN produces hundreds of terabytes of data per year, which mostly consists of high resolution all-sky images. With the proposed network expansion, this volume is going to increase. For the primary purpose of this network, meteorite recovery, only a small fraction of this data (images containing fireballs) is needed, and it is handled by the data processing pipeline (above). Other potential uses for the data include areas of astronomy or Space Situational Awareness.

The full data volumes recorded by the cameras are too large to be transferred remotely. Removable hard drives are therefore collected during regular servicing of the DFN observatory sites, replaced with blank hard drives, and then transported to Perth to be archived in a data store at the Pawsey Supercomputing Centre. The multi-petabyte data store allows searching of the dataset, using generic and project-custom metadata, and data sharing with other research groups.

== Meteorite searching ==
Meteorite fall predictions from a camera network typically produce a "fall line"—a straight or curved line on the ground typically a few km long—where it is believed the meteorite has fallen somewhere along the line, but its precise location is unknown. This is a result of the triangulation process, the effect of atmospheric winds during the fall, and knowledge of the apparent visible deceleration of the meteorite, but a lack of knowledge of its density, shape and precise mass.

Meteorite searching theory owes much to search and rescue theory, albeit somewhat simplified as the meteorite is not a moving target. Most of the falls observed by the DFN are in the remote outback, and so searching teams usually consist of 4-6 people, who camp on site for up to two weeks. This means that the searching strategy is focused on efficiency, rather than speed: meteorite recovery on the final day of the expedition is just as scientifically valuable as the first day, which contrasts to, for example, missing person search and rescue, where speed is of the essence. The practical searching techniques used by the DFN team are adapted to the predicted fall size and error ellipse:

- Searching on foot, gridding the area using GPS units to guide walkers, or using survey flags to mark areas, useful for smaller predicted masses, or a smaller error ellipse. This allows detailed coverage of the area with a higher confidence, but less area is searched per unit time.
- For larger areas, searching using quadbikes or ATVs. This is most applicable for larger predicted falls, or good clear area with good long distance visibility.
- Current research is focusing on the use of drones as a technique to improve efficiency.

== Outreach ==
Fireballs in the Sky is a citizen science program that allows people around the world to contribute fireball sightings via an augmented reality mobile app. This allows them to get involved DFN research by supplementing DFN observations. The DFN also provided resources with teachers.

== Partners ==
The DFN project is based at Curtin University in Perth, Western Australia. Together with NASA, the DFN is expanding to a Global Fireball Observatory through the Solar System Exploration Research Virtual Institute (SSERVI). SSERVI's science and technical research focuses on the connection between planetary exploration and human exploration via funded U.S. teams and a large network of international partners.

== See also ==
- Glossary of meteoritics
- European Fireball Network
