= Mason Gully =

Meteorite found in Western Australia

- Type: Ordinary Chondrite
- Class: H5
- Parent body: Unknown
- Composition: Olivine 29%, Orthopyroxene 32%, Clinopyroxene 3%, Plagioclase 3%, Metal 26%, Sulphide 6%, Other 1–2%
- Shock stage: S1
- Weathering grade: W1
- Country: Australia
- Region: Nullarbor Region, Western Australia
- Observed fall: Yes
- Fall date: 13 April 2010 at 10h36m10s UTC
- Found date: 3 November 2010
- Strewn field: No

Mason Gully is an ordinary chondrite of subclass H5, and is the second meteorite to be recovered using the Desert Fireball Network (DFN) camera observatory. One stone weighing 24.5g was observed to fall by the Desert Fireball Network observatory in Western Australia on 13 April 2010 at 10h36m10s UTC. It was recovered by the DFN on 3 November 2010 by Dr. R. Merle and the Fireball network recovery team, and was found 150m from its predicted fall location based upon the observed trajectory and calculated mass.

== Petrography, composition and physical properties ==
Mason Gully is an ordinary chondrite- a group of meteorites which are frequently found on the Earth's surface and make up a large proportion of the observed meteorite falls. It was identified as belonging to the H chemical class, which has a high siderophile element component (H), typically contains small chondrules, and has an oxygen isotopic signature closest to the terrestrial fractionation line out of all ordinary chondrites. A petrologic type of 5 indicates it has undergone a moderate amount of thermal metamorphism, which has caused some chemical homogenization and resulted in less distinct chondrule edges and secondary mineral growth.

Mineral	Composition (electron microprobe)
Olivine	Fa_{18.7}
Orthopyroxene	Fs_{16.4}Wo_{1.2}
Clinopyroxene	Fs_{5.9}Wo_{45.5}
Plagioclase	Ab_{82.9}An_{12.5}Or_{4.6}
Chromite	(Fe/Fe+Mg = 0.84; Cr/Cr+Al = 0.86)

This meteorite shows low levels of terrestrial weathering, consistent with residing in a region of low precipitation for 7 months. The stone was 3 cm in length along the longest axis, approximately 50% fusion crusted, and has a porosity of 10.7%. It exhibits very low levels of shock and is therefore classified as an S1.

== Petrogenesis and origin ==
Mason Gully has an unusually high porosity and different mineralogy when compared to other H5 chondrites. Its porosity comes from intergranular void spaces rather than microscopic cracks, which is likely due to the low shock the rock has experienced. Whilst lithophile elemental abundances are consistent with other H chondrites, the uranium and titanium abundances are noticeably lower. Conversely, heavy refractory elements are enriched relative to the H chondrite group.

The modal ratio of olivine:pyroxene is oddly low for an H5 ordinary chondrite; typical values are ~1.31, and yet modal analyses indicate the ratio for Mason Gully is as low as 0.84. Plagioclase abundance is also lower than typical values, but Fe(Ni)-metal abundances are higher than average for the H5 group.

Metamorphic temperatures were determined based upon the measured oxygen fugacity, using the two-pyroxene and olivine-spinel geothermometry methods. The two-pyroxene approach yielded temperatures between 865 °C - 900 °C, whilst the olivine-spinel approach yielded a temperature of 705 °C. These results are very similar to the H6 Kernouvé implying both samples experienced similar metamorphic temperatures.

The source of the unusual features of the sample relative to other H5 chondrites has yet to be agreed upon. The olivine and pyroxene ratios may result from the metamorphic history of the parent body; reactions between olivines, low-Ca pyroxenes and Fe metal could result in a larger abundance of low-Ca pyroxene in reducing conditions. Alternatively, plagioclase and olivine can produce orthopyroxene at high temperatures, or high sulphidation may have caused the olivines to break down into Fe metal and orthopyroxenes. All explanations are plausible, however no consensus has been reached to identify the most probable process, as each holds implications that are not fully supported by the observations in Mason Gully.

== Fall description ==
The fireball associated with this sample was observed by two Desert Fireball Network cameras in the east of the Nullarbor Plain. The luminous trajectory began at an altitude of 83.46 km and ended at 23.84 km altitude. The incoming rock, of ~40 kg initial mass, was travelling with a velocity of 14.53 km/s when it entered the atmosphere, and then proceeded to decelerate to a terminal velocity of 4.1 km/s, over a period of 6 seconds. The angle of atmospheric entry with respect the Earth's surface was 53.9°

The calculated orbit was typically Apollo-type, and largely existed outside of the Earth's orbit. The aphelion was found to be in the outer asteroid belt. The full orbit is defined by the following orbital elements:

- semimajor axis (AU): 2.470 ± 0.004
- eccentricity: 0.6023 ± 0.0007
- perihelion distance (AU): 0.98240 ± 0.00007
- aphelion distance (AU): 3.958 ± 0.008
- argument of perihelion (°): 18.95 ± 0.03
- longitude of ascending node (°): 203.2112
- inclination (°): 0.832 ± 0.013
- period (years): 3.882 ± 0.009
