= Dingle Dell meteorite =

Meteorite found in Western Australia

Dingle Dell
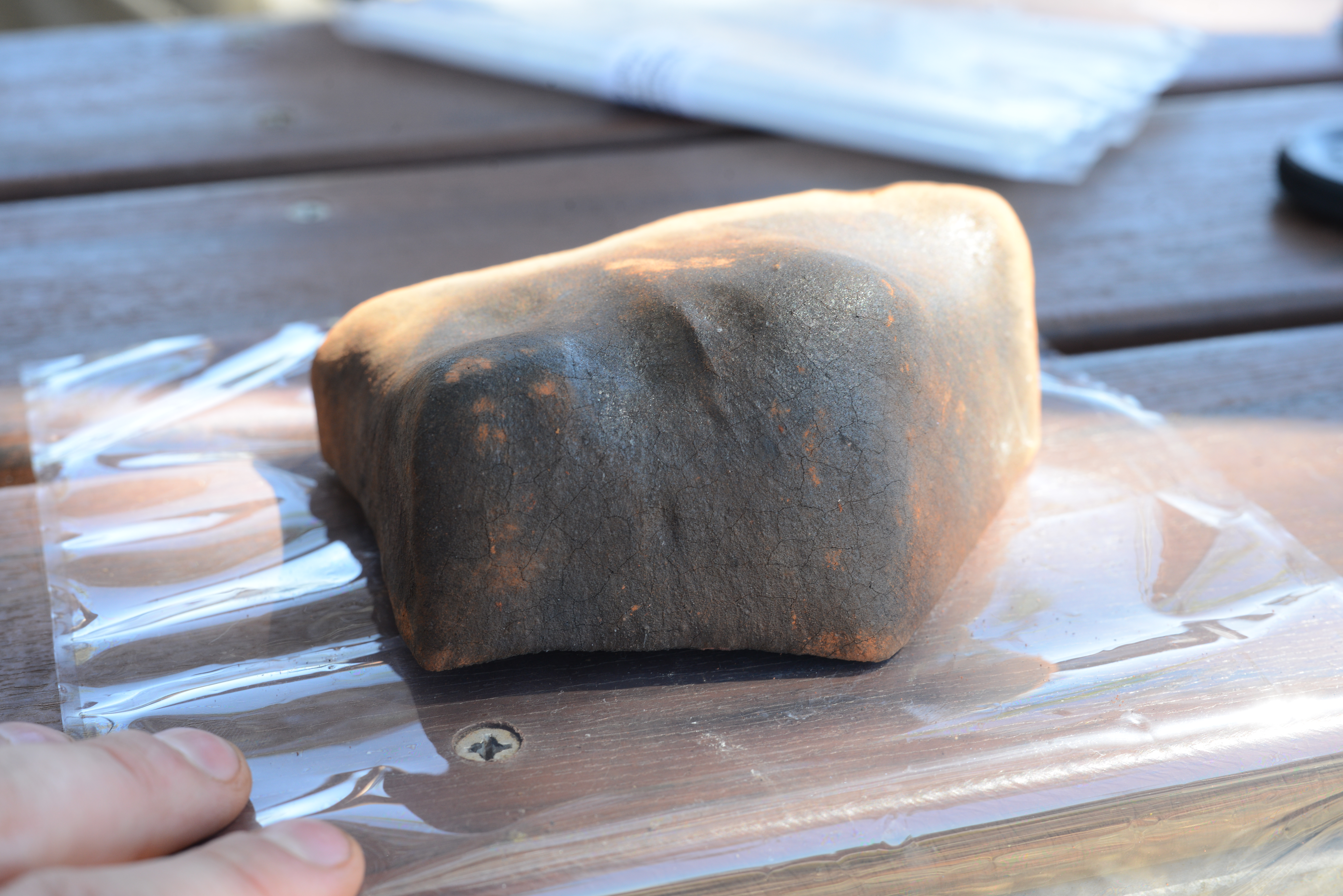
- Type: Ordinary chondrite
- Class: L/LL5
- Parent body: Unknown
- Shock stage: S2
- Weathering grade: W0
- Country: Australia
- Region: Morawa, Western Australia
- Coordinates: 29.20608°S 116.21547°E
- Observed fall: Yes
- Fall date: 31 October 2016 at 12.03.46 pm UTC
- Found date: 7 November 2016
- Strewn field: No

Dingle Dell is a 1.15 kg ordinary chondrite of subclass L/LL5, and the fourth meteorite to be recovered by the Desert Fireball Network camera observatory. It fell in the Morawa region of Western Australia on 31 October 2016 8:05 pm local time, and was recovered less than a week later, on the morning of 7 November, in a paddock at Dingle Dell farm. Given the rapid turnaround for meteorite recovery and a lack of rainfall between fall date and find date, the rock is in pristine condition and shows no evidence of terrestrial weathering (W0). This particular meteorite fall demonstrates the proficiency of the DFN as a sample recovery tool for meteoritics.

== Physical properties and composition ==
The rock is 1.15 kg in mass, and approximately 16 × 9 × 4 cm in size. It was originally slightly wedged shaped, with pristine fusion crust that is both primary and secondary, which indicate this rock broke up as it was passing through the Earth's atmosphere.

Dingle dell contains chondrules between 1.15 – 4.11 mm in diameter that are poorly defined, which is characteristic of a type 5 ordinary chondrite and moderate amounts of thermal metamorphism. Both olivine and pyroxene have undulose extinction, which is evidence for mild shock, and therefore this rock is classified as an S2.

Mineral	Composition (electron microprobe)
Olivine	Fa_{25.5}
Orthopyroxene	Fs_{21.9}Wo_{1.3}

Bulk density is 3.23 g/cm^{3}, and grain density is 3.61 g/cm^{3}. Together, these measurements imply Dingle Dell has a porosity of 10.5%, which is close to the mean for lightly shocked, unweathered ordinary chondrite falls. The magnetic susceptibility and grain density of the meteorite are higher than typical LL chondrites, however together with the physical properties of the rock, Dingle Dell belongs to an intermediate population of meteorites that lie between the L and LL chemical groups.

== Fall description and Recovery ==
Several fireball reports were made by the public in the wheat-belt region of Western Australia using the Fireballs in the Sky smartphone app. Users can report a fireball sighting to help supplement the data obtained from the Desert Fireball Network observatory. Six of the DFN cameras also observed the 6.2-second fireball. The rock entered the Earth's atmosphere traveling with a velocity of 15.43 km/s. It decelerated to a velocity of 3.54 km/s over a distance of 78 km, and stopped ablating at 19.52 km altitude. Members of the Desert Fireball Network team visited the local area around the fall on 3 November, to contact local land owners to seek permission to search. Following this, a search team of 4 people arrived on 5 November; the meteorite was recovered on the second day of searching.
