= Dingle Dell (St Heliers) =

Park in Auckland, New Zealand

Dingle Dell Reserve
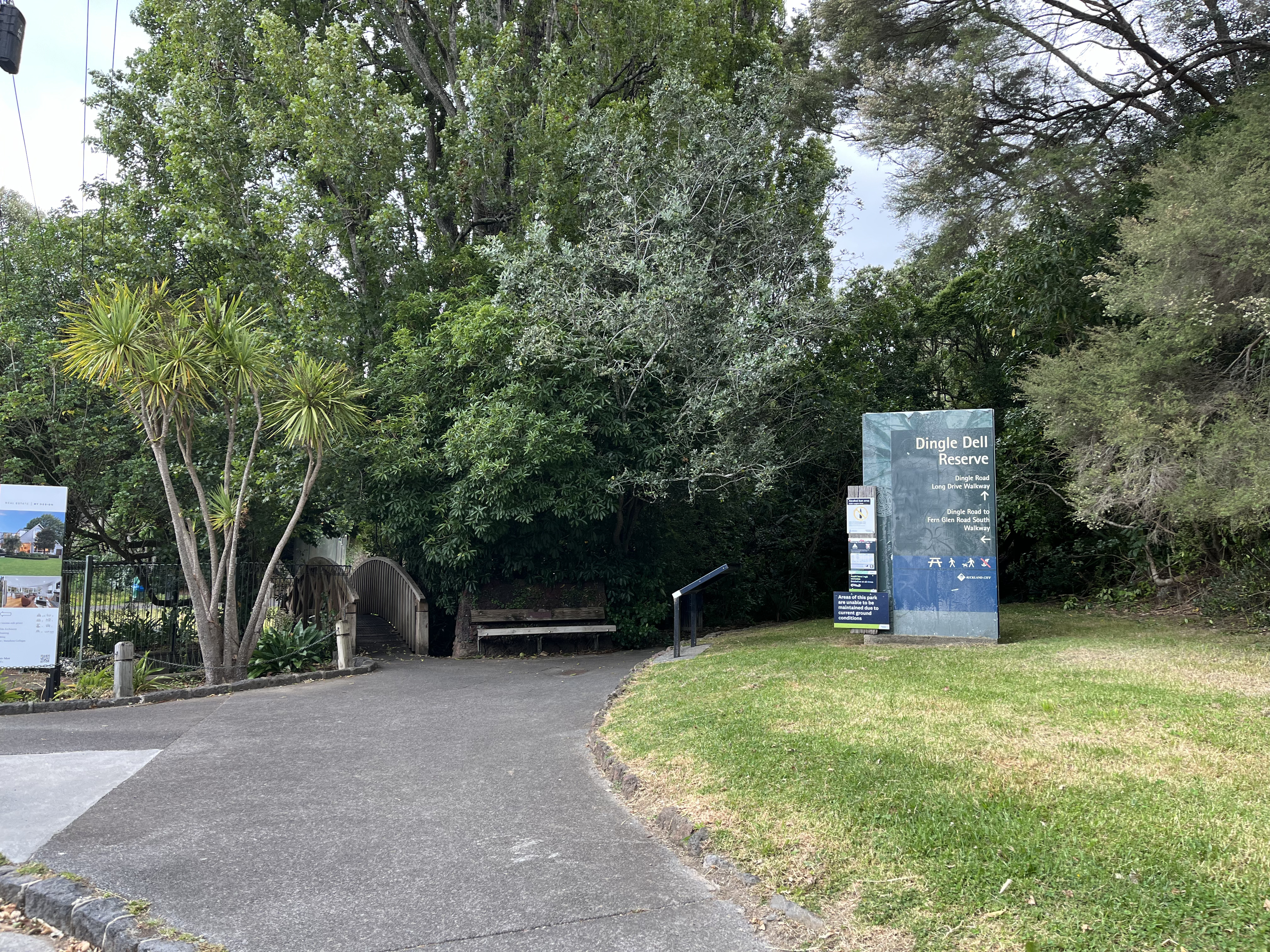
- Entrance to Dingle Dell at Dingle Road
- Interactive map of Dingle Dell Reserve
- Type: Public park
- Location: Auckland, New Zealand
- Coordinates: 36°51′29″S 174°51′22″E
- Created: 1928
- Operator: Auckland Council
- Status: Open year round

Dingle Dell Reserve is a nature reserve in the St Heliers suburb of Auckland, New Zealand. Established in 1928, it consists of 6.48 hectares of native bush with scenic trails, a small grass field, and native kauri and kohekohe trees. The reserve was established in 1928 in what was then a raupō swamp. It is currently managed by the Auckland Council as a part of the Ōrākei Local Board Area.

== Naming ==
After European settlement the area that would become Dingle Dell was called the "bush reserve" by St Heliers residents. In 1925 a local resident Mr Todd Smith wrote to The Tamaki Recorder requesting a change to a more distinctive name. The name was changed to Dingle's Bush, and then Dingle Dell in the 1930s. Dingle Dell is a reference by a local resident to Charles Dickens' "Dingley Dell" in The Pickwick Papers.

== History ==
In 1904 the West Tamaki Road Board took over the area from the New Zealand and Rive Plate Land Mortgage Company. The reserve was originally a raupō swamp, but in 1928 Auckland City Council took over the area following the amalgamation of the West Tamaki Road Board with Auckland City and began the transformation into the reserve it is today.

In 1928 a women's progress league was formed in St Heliers, which collected money and hosted working bees to create the first path down Dingle Road.

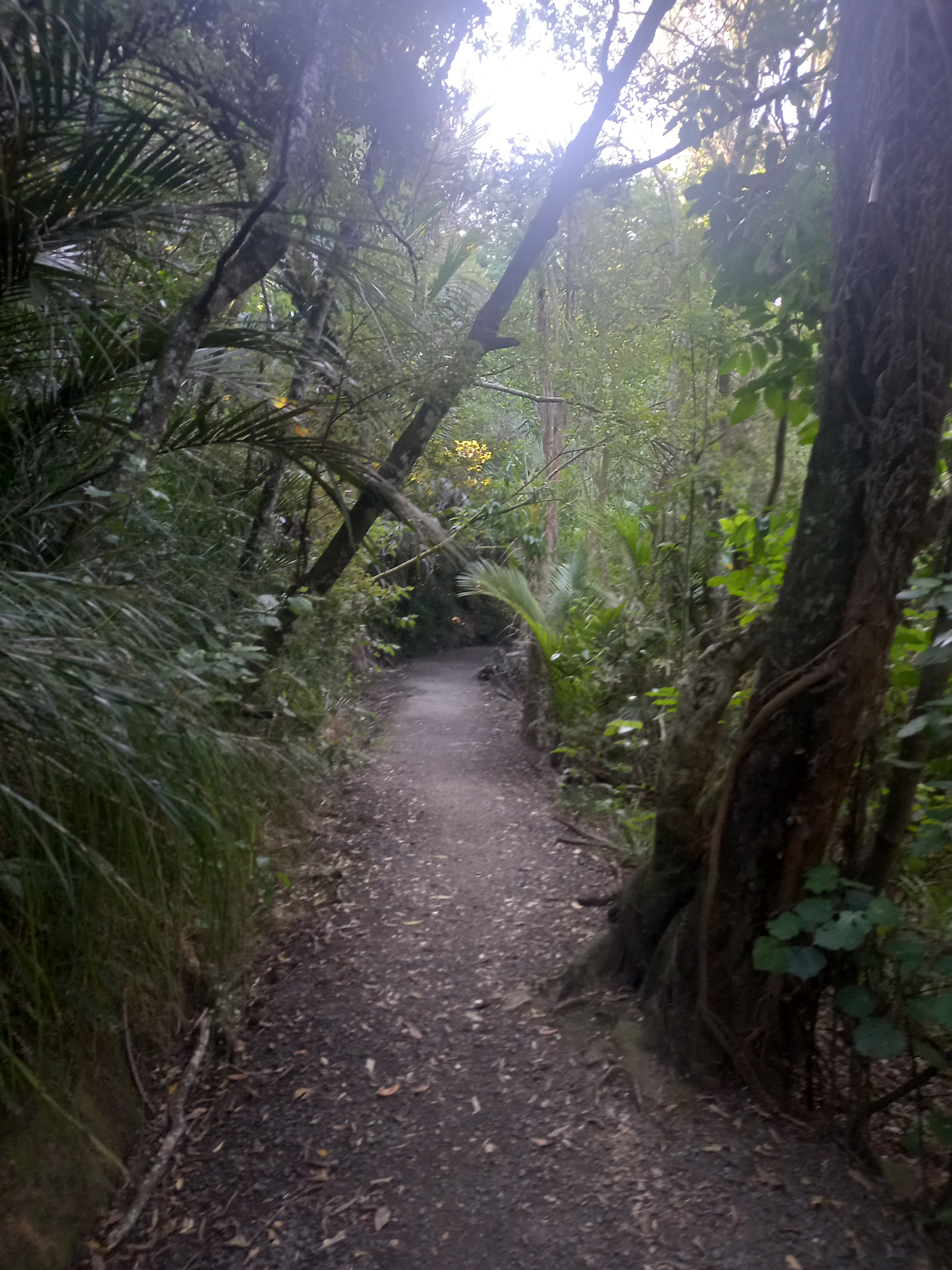
Walking track 2024

In the 1930s, men on labour relief schemes spurred by the Great Depression built Fern Glen Road. They filled the swamp and formed about 20 paths. The Director of Plant Reserves Mr T.G. Aldridge and St Heliers resident Mr J.W. Kealy lead the planting of native ferns and trees, including nikau palms.

In 1950 the St Heliers Beautifying Society helped to transform the reserve into a "wilderness park," closely resembling the reserve as it is today. The reserve at the time lacked native trees and had sparse growth, with only one kauri. The Society appealed to the Mayor of Auckland John Allum for funding, and was involved in the planting and development of the reserve. The Society appealed to the Mayor of Auckland John Allum for funding, and was involved in the planting and development of the reserve which was at that time still in poor and unsafe condition.

In 1954, 100 trees were planted for the 50th anniversary of the West Tamaki Road Board taking over the reserve. As of June 1955 the reserve had 72 kauri trees, 36 rimu trees, and 20 varieties of native trees. In this year 100 nikau trees were planted. The St Heliers Beautifying Society added three seats by the Fern Glen Road entrance to the reserve.

== Natural environment ==
=== Walking Paths ===
The reserve features a number of all-weather walking paths on gravel, tracks, and stairs in the bush.

=== Notable species ===
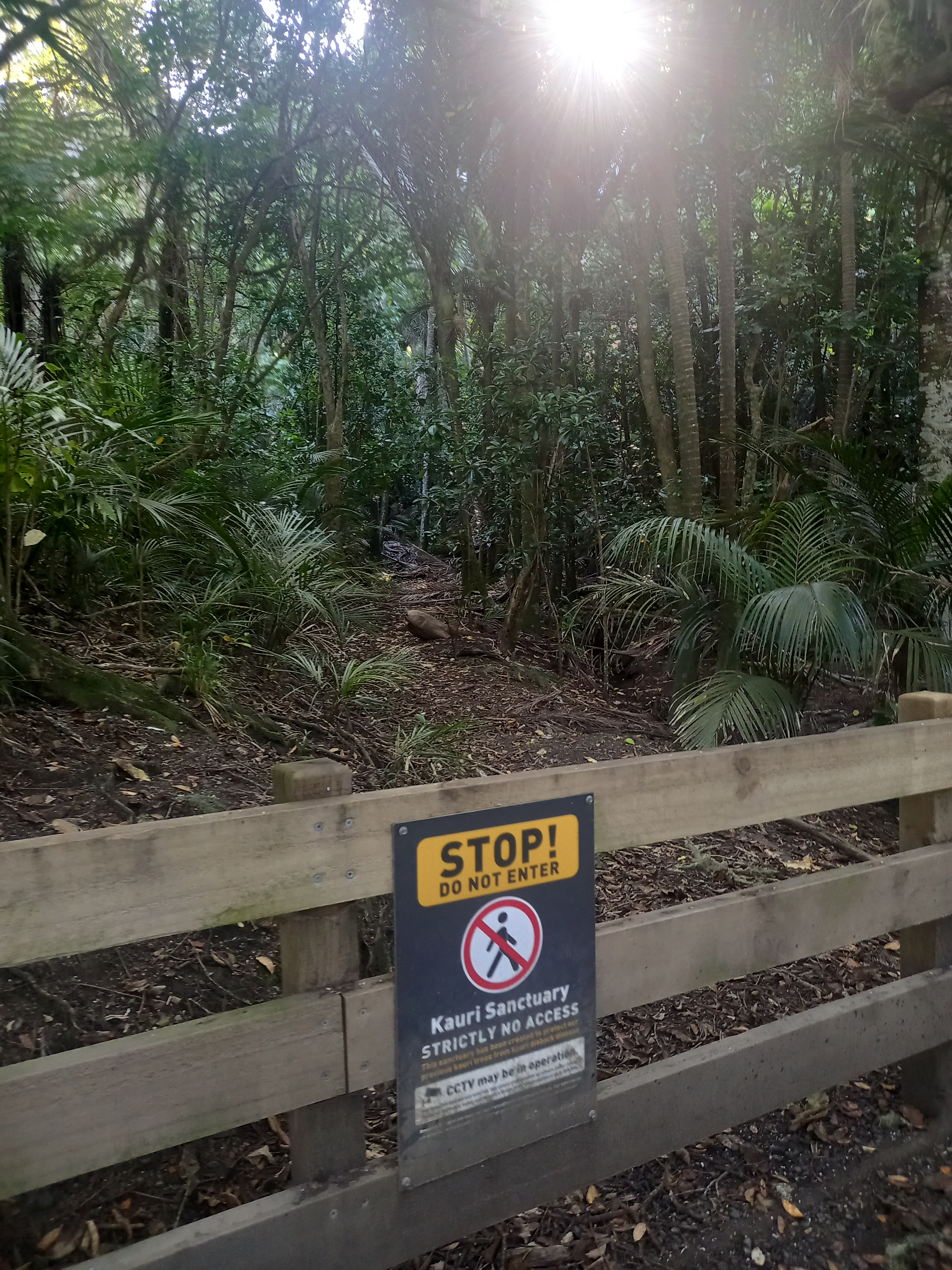
A kauri sanctuary with warning sign in Dingle Dell

The diversity of native bush in Dingle Dell has allowed for the growth and habitation of many native species not often found in urban areas. Kanuka, cabbage tree, karaka, kohekohe, and mahoe trees are dominant in the reserve. The Auckland Botanical Society has led excursions to Dingle Dell, the first being in 1939.

==== Kauri ====
Up to a hundred kauri trees can be found in Dingle Dell, which are threatened by kauri dieback. Fences and signs have been placed to warn visitors about the risk of kauri dieback and to keep visitors on the paths.

== Memorials and Buildings ==
=== King George VI Memorial ===
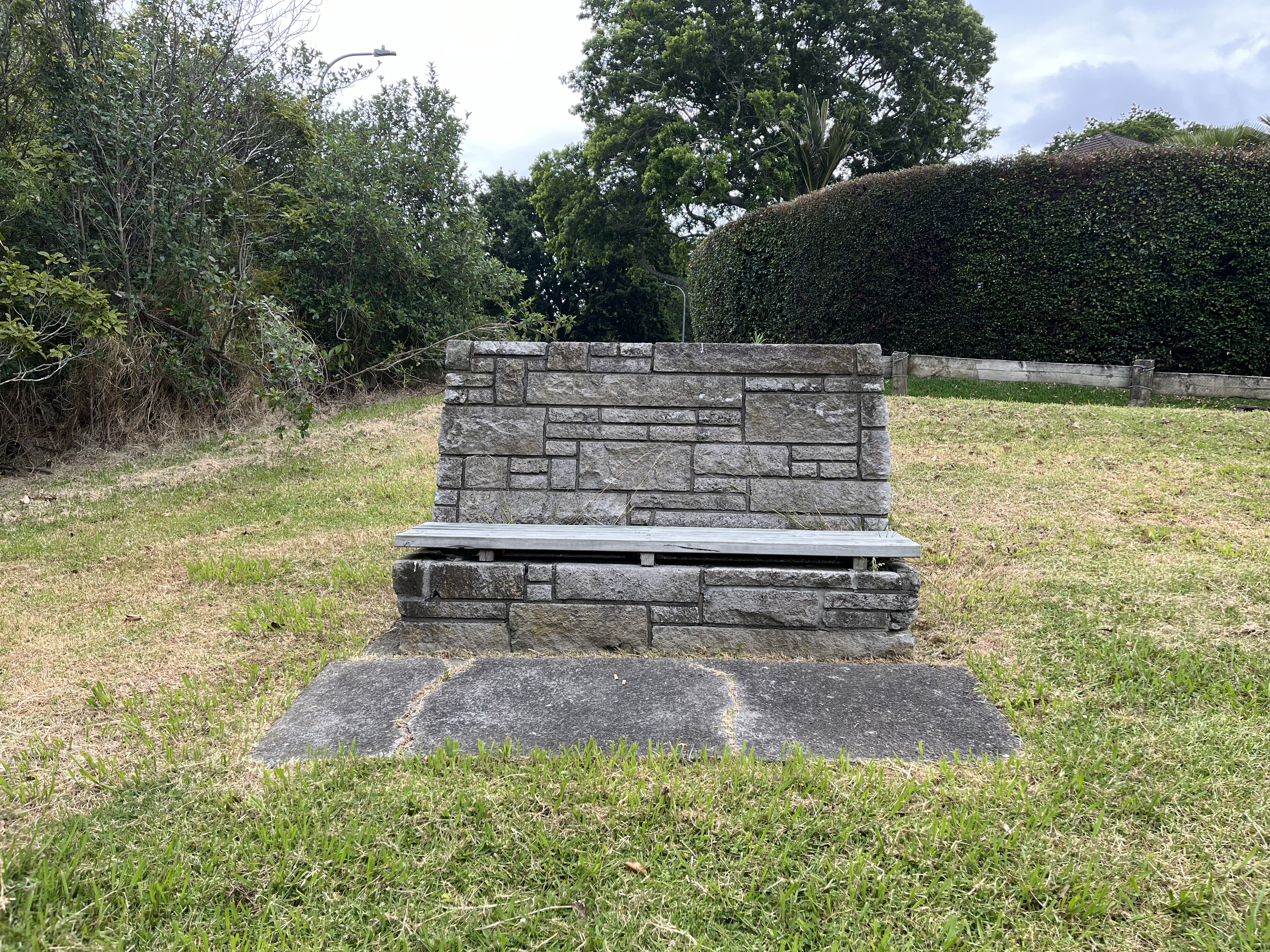
King George VI Dingle Dell memorial bench

A kauri grove of 70 saplings was planted in memory of King George VI.

Dedication to King George VI	Text of Inscription
	This Kauri Grove was planted in Memory of King George VI 1952

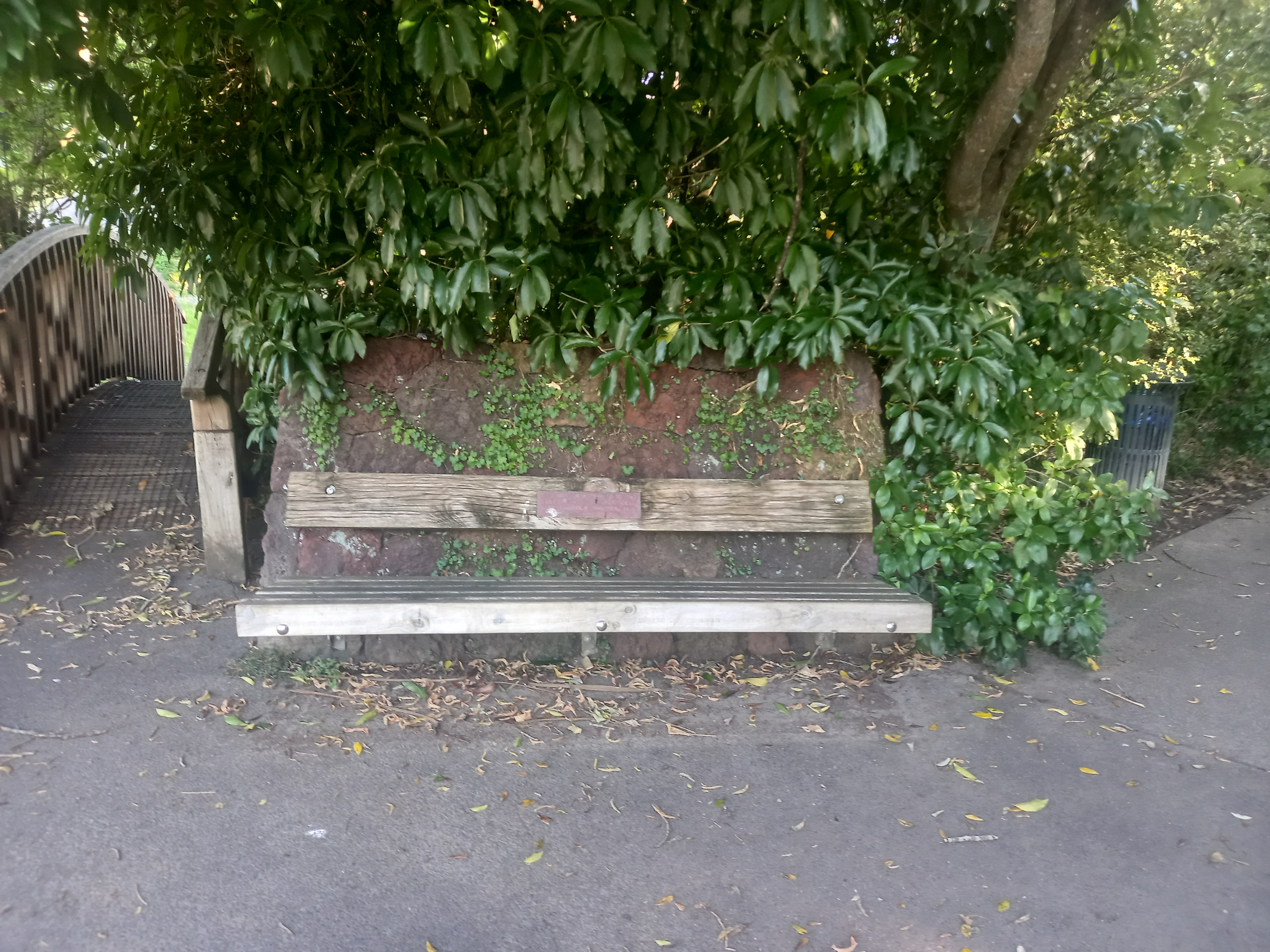
Winifred Huggins Memorial Seat 2024

=== Winifred Huggins Memorial Seat ===
The Winifred Huggins Memorial Seat is dedicated to Winifred Huggins. Prime Minister Sir Robert Muldoon dedicated the seat on 18 March 184. The Mayor of Auckland Dame Catherine Tizard and 100 other guests attended. Huggins was not able to attend due to ill health.

Huggins founded the St Heliers Beautifying Society and Tree Society. She received the British Empire Medal for her tree planting work. She was a key figure in the development of Dingle Dell Reserve, and the Auckland City Council appointed her an honorary ranger.

Dedication to Winifred Huggins	Text of Inscription
	THIS SEAT IS A TRIBUTE TO THE TREE LADY OF DINGLE DELL MISS WINIFRED HUGGINS B.E.M. 1983

== Gallery ==
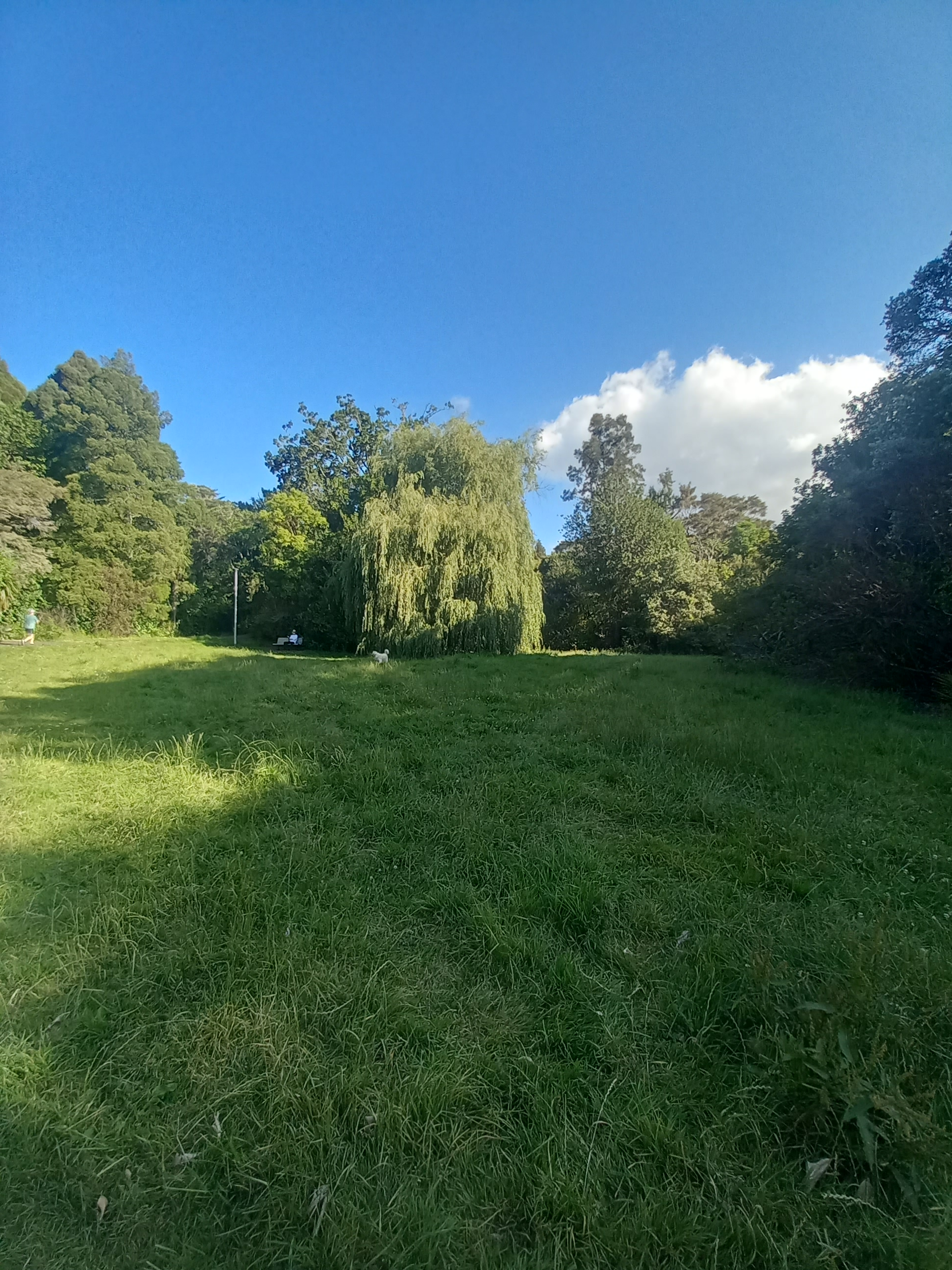
Dingle Dell Field

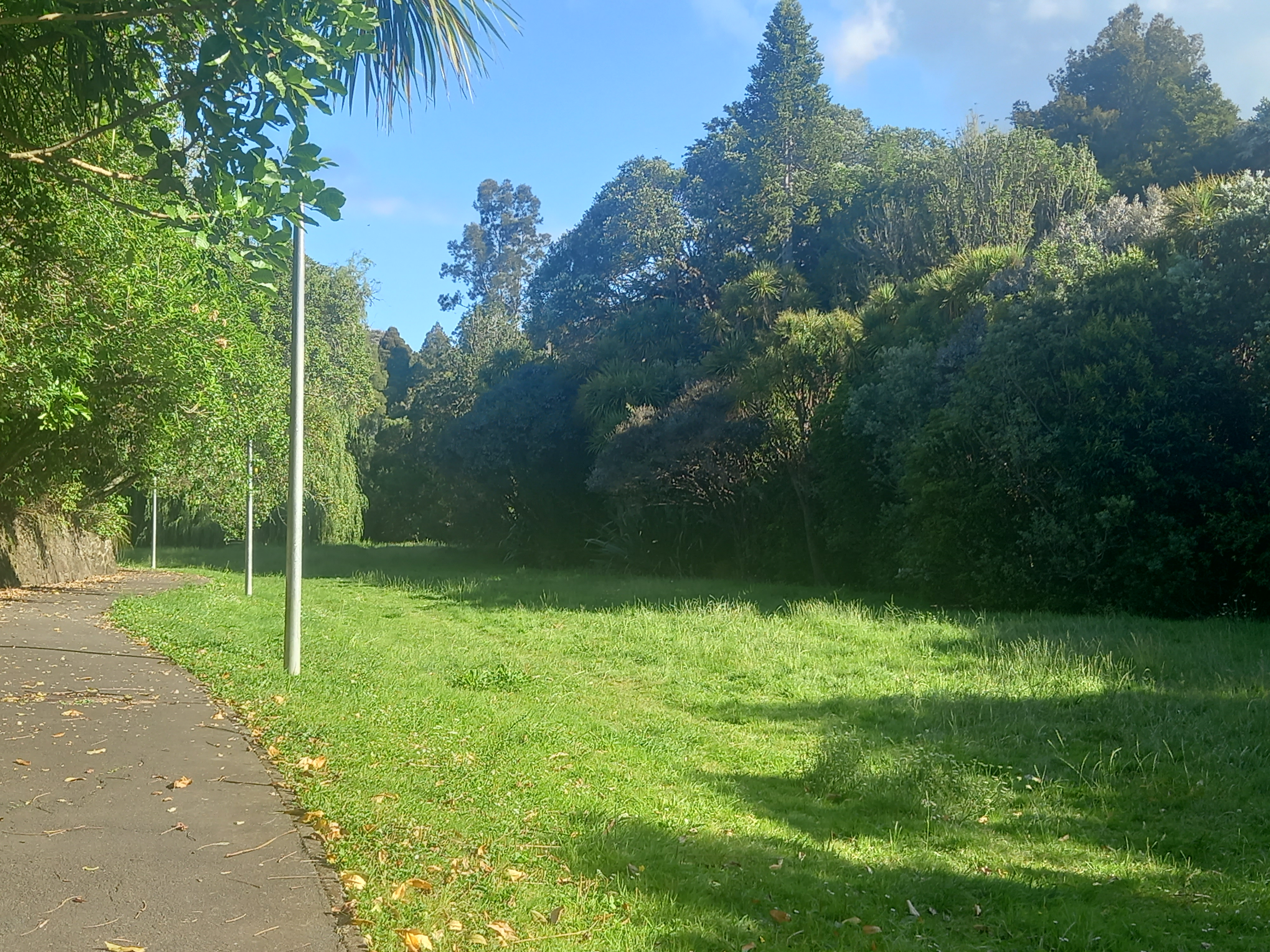
Dingle Dell path and field

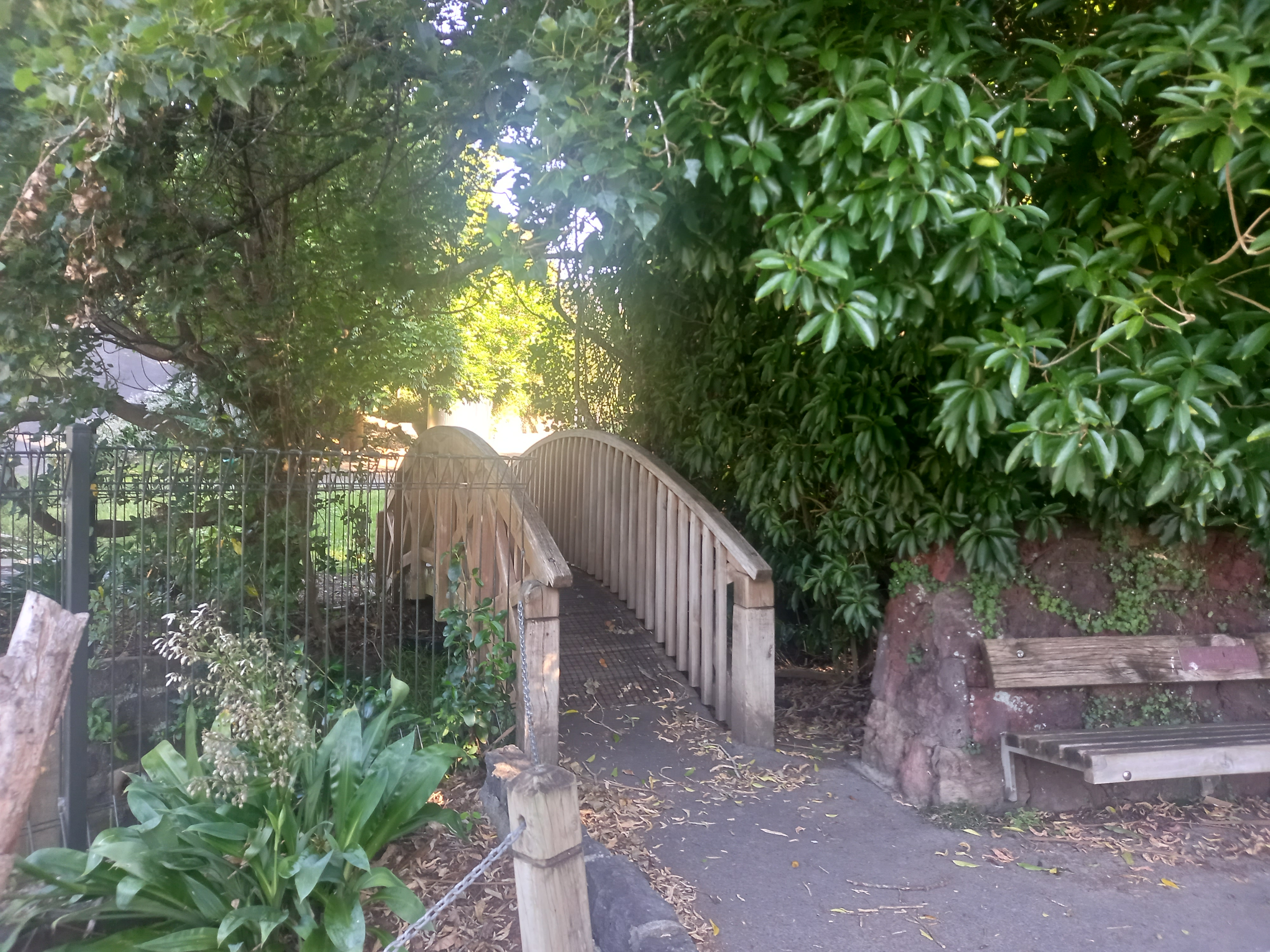
Bridge at Dingle Road entrance

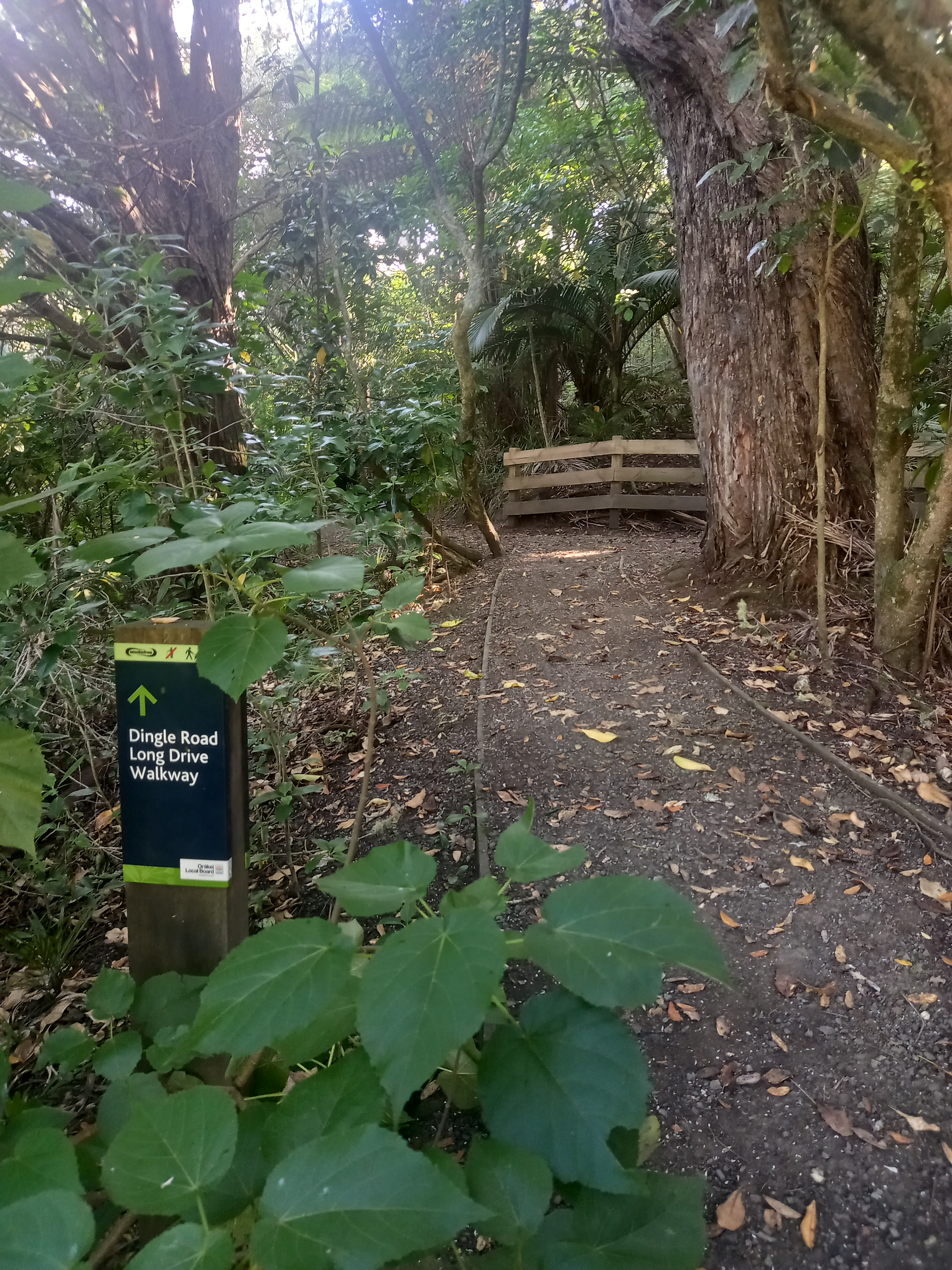
Dingle Dell Walk

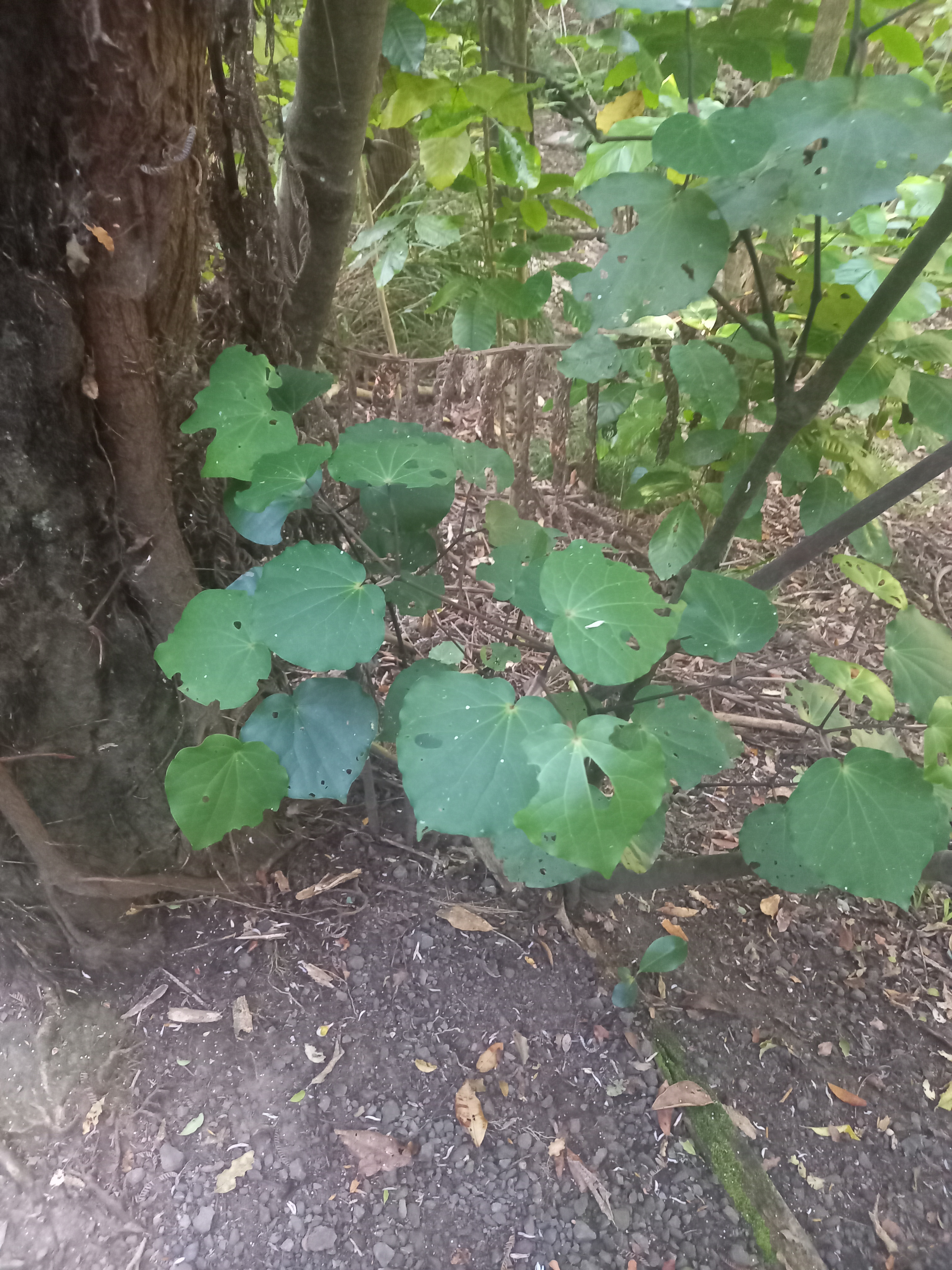
Kawakawa plant
