= Parent body =

Celestial body from which a meteorite or class of meteorites originates

A parent body in meteoritics is the celestial body from which originates a meteorite or a class of meteorites.

== Identification ==
It is easiest to correlate a meteorite with a parent body when the parent body still exists. This is the case for Lunar and Martian meteorites. Samples from suspected Lunar meteorites can be compared with samples from the Apollo program. Martian meteorites can be compared to analysis carried out by rovers (e.g. Curiosity).

Meteorites can also be compared to spectral classes of asteroids. In order to identify the parent body of a class of meteorites, scientists compare their albedo and spectra with other known bodies. These studies show that some meteorite classes are closely related to some asteroids. The HED meteorites for example are correlated with 4 Vesta.

Another, perhaps most useful way to classify meteorites by parent bodies is by grouping them according to composition, with types from each hypothetical parent body clustering on a graph. Meteoriticists have tentatively linked extant meteorites to 100-150 parent bodies, far fewer than the ~1 million main-belt asteroids larger than a kilometer. This apparent sampling bias remains an area of active research.

== See also ==
- Asteroid family
- Glossary of meteoritics
