= Wollastonite =

Single chain calcium inosilicate (CaSiO_{3})

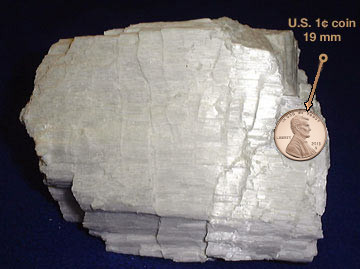

General
- Category: Inosilicate mineral
- Formula: Calcium metasilicate, CaSiO_{3}
- IMA symbol: Wo
- Strunz classification: 9.DG.05
- Crystal system: Triclinic; Monoclinic polytype exists
- Crystal class: Pinacoidal (1̅) (same H-M symbol)
- Space group: P1̅ (Triclinic); P2_{1}/a (Monoclinic)
- Unit cell: a = 7.925 Å, b = 7.32 Å, c = 7.065 Å; α = 90.055°, β = 95.217°, γ = 103.42°; Z = 6

Identification
- Formula mass: 116.159 g/mol
- Color: White, colorless or gray
- Crystal habit: Rare as tabular crystals—commonly massive in lamellar, radiating, compact and fibrous aggregates.
- Twinning: Common
- Cleavage: Perfect in two directions at near 90°
- Fracture: Splintery to uneven
- Mohs scale hardness: 4.5 to 5.0
- Luster: Vitreous or dull to pearly on cleavage surfaces
- Streak: White
- Diaphaneity: Transparent to translucent
- Specific gravity: 2.86–3.09
- Optical properties: Biaxial (−)
- Refractive index: n_{α} = 1.616–1.640 n_{β} = 1.628–1.650 n_{γ} = 1.631–1.653
- Birefringence: δ = 0.015 max
- 2V angle: Measured: 36° to 60°
- Melting point: 1540 °C
- Solubility: Soluble in HCl, insoluble in water
- Other characteristics: Heat of formation (@298): −89.61kJ; Gibbs free energy: 41.78kJ

Wollastonite is a calcium inosilicate mineral (CaSiO_{3}) that may contain small amounts of iron, magnesium, and manganese substituting for calcium. It is usually white. It forms when impure limestone or dolomite is subjected to high temperature and pressure, which sometimes occurs in the presence of silica-bearing fluids as in skarns or in contact with metamorphic rocks. Associated minerals include garnets, vesuvianite, diopside, tremolite, epidote, plagioclase feldspar, pyroxene and calcite. It is named after the English chemist and mineralogist William Hyde Wollaston (1766–1828).

Despite its chemical similarity to the compositional spectrum of the pyroxene group of minerals—where magnesium (Mg) and iron (Fe) substitution for calcium ends with diopside and hedenbergite respectively—it is structurally very different, with a third SiO^{4−}_{4} tetrahedron in the linked chain (as opposed to two in the pyroxenes).

== Production trends ==
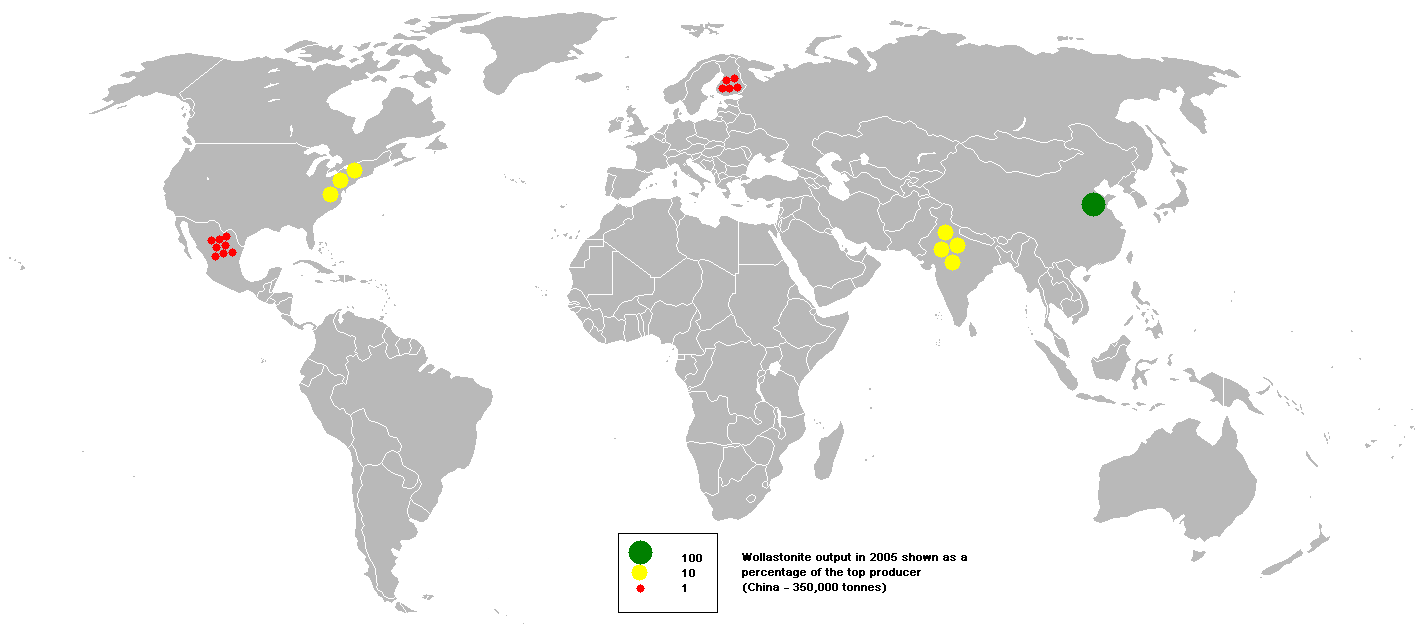
Wollastonite output in 2005

Estimated world production of crude wollastonite ore was 1,200,000 tonnes in 2021. World reserves of wollastonite are estimated to exceed 100 million tonnes, though some existing deposits have not been surveyed.

Major producers of wollastonite include China, India, the United States, Mexico, and Finland.

In the United States, wollastonite is mined in Willsboro, New York (the first laboratory for local wollastonite research was in Essex, New York by Koert Burnham in the 1940s. The original laboratory building still exists as a residential & commercial building) and Gouverneur, New York. Deposits have also been mined commercially in North Western Mexico.

The price of raw wollastonite in 2008 varied between US$80 and US$500 per tonne depending on the country and size and shape of the powder particles.

== Uses ==
Wollastonite is among the fastest reacting silicates, but may have high costs associated with carbon storage. Addition of wollastonite to soil stimulates organic carbon mineralization.

=== Ceramics ===
Wollastonite has industrial importance in ceramics manufacturing as an additive.

In ceramics, wollastonite decreases shrinkage and gas evolution during firing, increases green and fired strength, maintains brightness during firing, permits fast firing, and reduces crazing, cracking, and glaze defects.

=== Construction ===
Wollastonite can serve as a substitute for asbestos in floor tiles, friction products, insulating board and panels, paint, plastics, and roofing products. Similar to asbestos, wollastonite is resistant to chemical attack, stable at high temperatures, and improves flexural and tensile strength in composites. In some industries, wollastonite is used in different percentages of impurities, such as its use as a fabricator of mineral wool insulation, or as an ornamental building material. Wollastonite is used in a cement announced in 2019 which "reduces the overall carbon footprint in precast concrete by 70%."

Wollastonite has been studied for carbon mineralization for storage of carbon dioxide (CO_{2}) according to the following reaction:

CaSiO_{3} + CO_{2} → CaCO_{3} + SiO_{2}

=== Metallurgy ===
In metallurgical applications, wollastonite serves as a flux for welding, a source for calcium oxide, a slag conditioner, and to protect the surface of molten metal during the continuous casting of steel.

=== Paint ===
As an additive in paint, wollastonite improves the durability of the paint film, acts as a pH buffer, improves its resistance to weathering, reduces gloss, reduces pigment consumption, and acts as a flatting and suspending agent.

=== Plastic ===
In plastics, wollastonite improves tensile and flexural strength, reduces resin consumption, and improves thermal and dimensional stability at elevated temperatures. Surface treatments are used to improve the adhesion between the wollastonite and the polymers to which it is added.

Plastics and rubber applications were estimated to account for 25% to 35% of U.S. sales in 2009, followed by ceramics with 20% to 25%; paint, 10% to 15%; metallurgical applications, 10% to 15%; friction products, 10% to 15%; and miscellaneous, 10% to 15%. Ceramic applications probably account for 30% to 40% of wollastonite sales worldwide, followed by polymers (plastics and rubber) with 30% to 35% of sales, and paint with 10% to 15% of sales. The remaining sales were for construction, friction products, and metallurgical applications.

=== Hydrogen production ===
Wollastonite is used in a dark fermentation process that produces hydrogen gas from organic substrates under oxygen-free conditions. The mineral acts as a dual-function agent to enhance yield while capturing CO_{2}.

== Substitutes ==
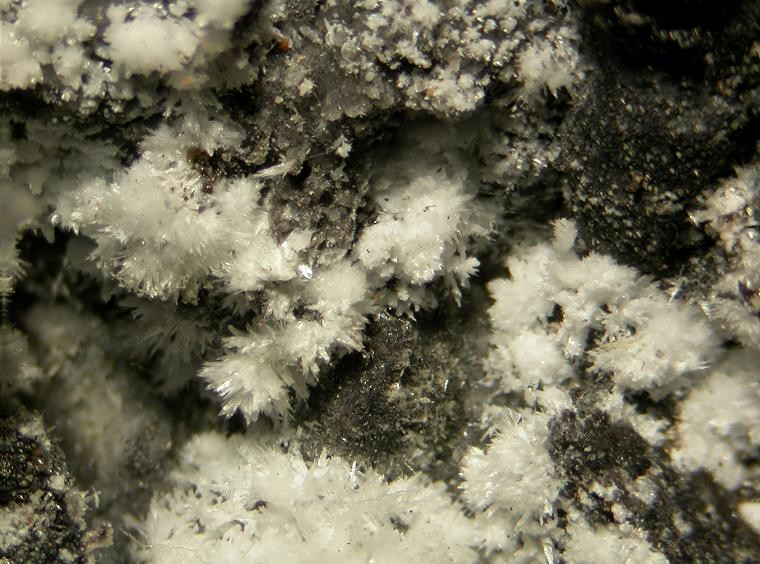
White acicular crystals of wollastonite (field of view 8 mm) from the Central Bohemia Region, Czech Republic

The acicular nature of many wollastonite products allows it to compete with other acicular materials, such as ceramic fiber, glass fiber, steel fiber, and several organic fibers, such as aramid, polyethylene, polypropylene, and polytetrafluoroethylene in products where improvements in dimensional stability, flexural modulus, and heat deflection are sought.

Wollastonite also competes with several nonfibrous minerals or rocks, such as kaolin, mica, and talc, which are added to plastics to increase flexural strength, and such minerals as barite, calcium carbonate, gypsum, and talc, which impart dimensional stability to plastics.

In ceramics, wollastonite competes with carbonates, feldspar, lime, and silica as a source of calcium and silicon. Its use in ceramics depends on the formulation of the ceramic body and the firing method.

== Composition ==
In a pure CaSiO_{3}, each component forms nearly half of the mineral by weight: 48.3% of CaO and 51.7% of SiO_{2}. In some cases, small amounts of iron (Fe), and manganese (Mn), and lesser amounts of magnesium (Mg) substitute for calcium (Ca) in the mineral formula (e.g., rhodonite). Wollastonite can form a series of solid solutions in the system CaSiO_{3}-FeSiO_{3}, or hydrothermal synthesis of phases in the system MnSiO_{3}-CaSiO_{3}.

== Geologic occurrence ==
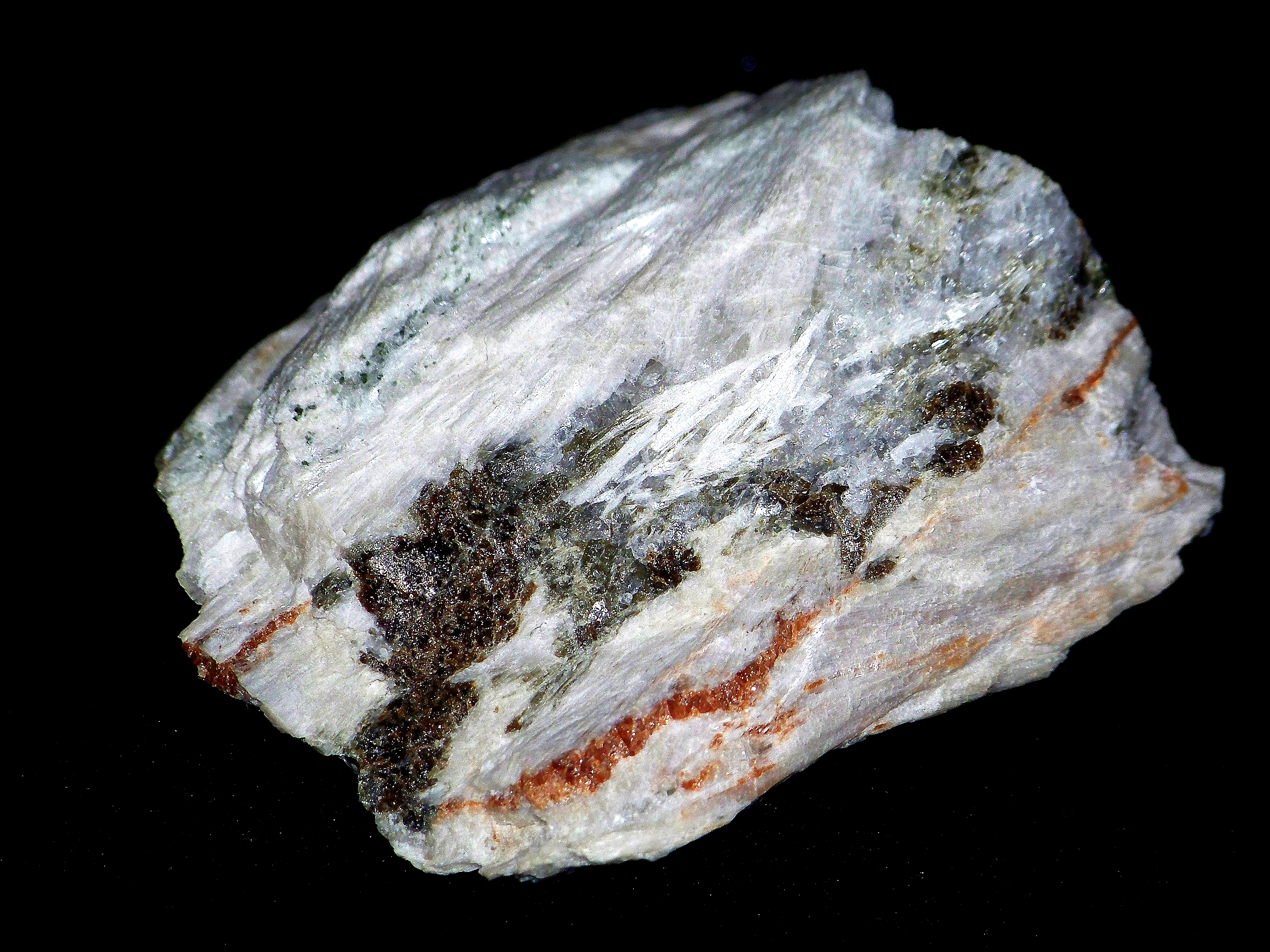
Wollastonite skarn with diopside (green), andradite garnet (red) and vesuvianite (dark brown) from the Stanisław mine near Szklarska Poręba, Izerskie Mountains, Lower Silesia, Poland.

Wollastonite usually occurs as a common constituent of a thermally metamorphosed impure limestone, it also could occur when the silicon is due to metamorphism in contact altered calcareous sediments, or to contamination in the invading igneous rock. In most of these occurrences it is the result of the following reaction between calcite and silica with the loss of carbon dioxide:

CaCO_{3} + SiO_{2} → CaSiO_{3} + CO_{2}

Wollastonite may also be produced in a diffusion reaction in skarn, it develops when limestone within a sandstone is metamorphosed by a dike, which results in the formation of wollastonite in the sandstone as a result of outward migration of Ca.

== Structure ==
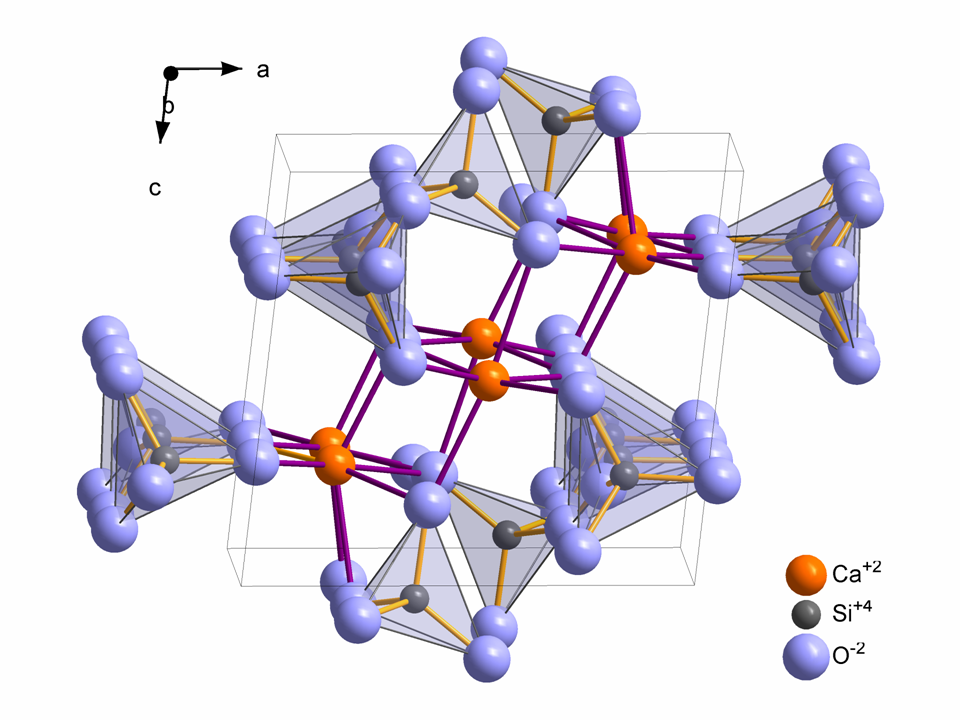
Unit cell of triclinic wollastonite-1A

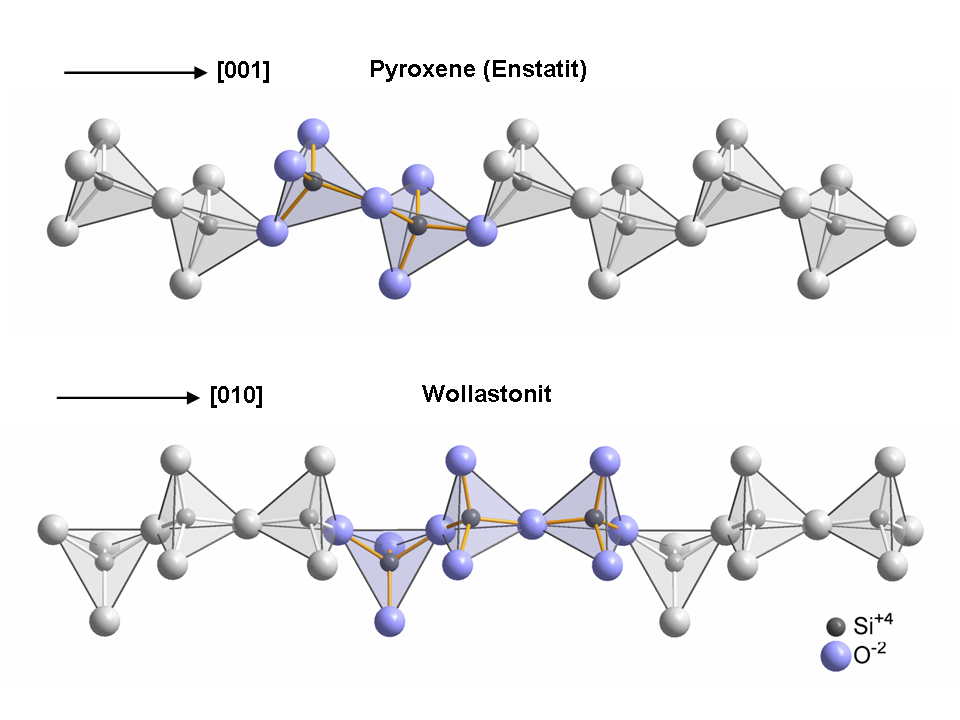
Tetrahedra arrangement within the chains in pyroxenes compared to wollastonite

Wollastonite crystallizes triclinically in space group P1̅ with the lattice constants a = 7.94 Å, b = 7.32 Å, c = 7.07 Å; α = 90,03°, β = 95,37°, γ = 103,43° and six formula units per unit cell. Wollastonite was once classed structurally among the pyroxene group, because both of these groups have a ratio of Si:O = 1:3. In 1931, Warren and Biscoe showed that the crystal structure of wollastonite differs from minerals of the pyroxene group, and they classified this mineral within a group known as the pyroxenoids. It has been shown that the pyroxenoid chains are more kinked than those of pyroxene group, and exhibit longer repeat distance. The structure of wollastonite contains infinite chains of [SiO_{4}] tetrahedra sharing common vertices, running parallel to the b-axis. The chain motif in wollastonite repeats after three tetrahedra, whereas in pyroxenes only two are needed. The repeat distance in the wollastonite chains is 7.32 Å and equals the length of the crystallographic b-axis.

Molten CaSiO_{3} maintains a tetrahedral SiO_{4} local structure at temperatures up to 2000 °C. The nearest neighbor Ca-O coordination decreases from 6.0(2) in the room temperature glass to 5.0(2) in the 1700 °C liquid, coincident with an increasing number of longer Ca-O neighbors.

== See also ==
- Enstatite – Pyroxene: magnesium-iron silicate with MgSiO_{3} and FeSiO_{3} end-members
- List of minerals
- List of minerals named after people
