= January 1970 =

Month of 1970

<<	January 1970					>>
Su	Mo	Tu	We	Th	Fr	Sa
				1	2	3
4	5	6	7	8	9	10
11	12	13	14	15	16	17
18	19	20	21	22	23	24
25	26	27	28	29	30	31

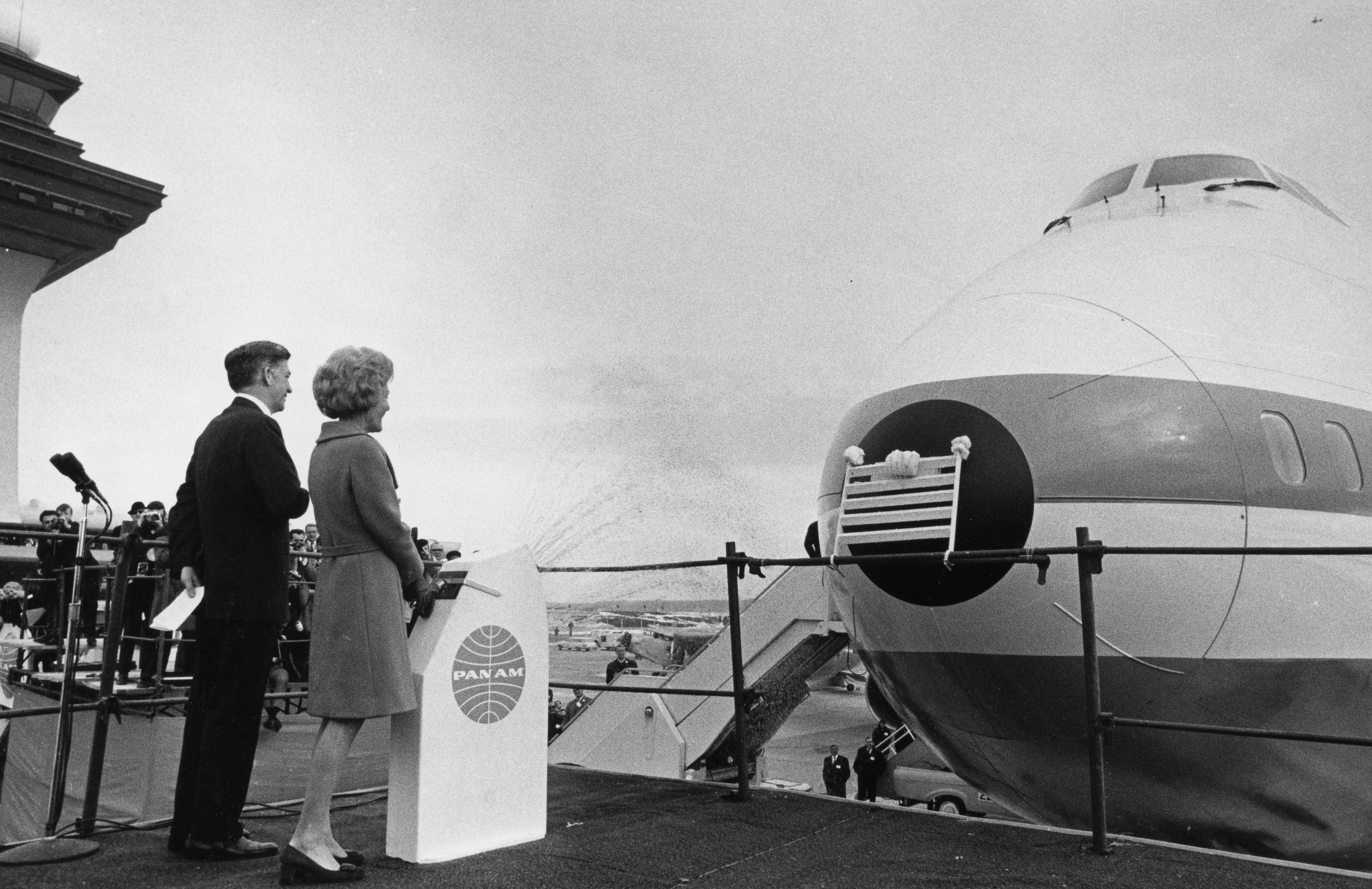
January 15, 1970: First Lady Pat Nixon christens the new Boeing 747 "jumbo jet"

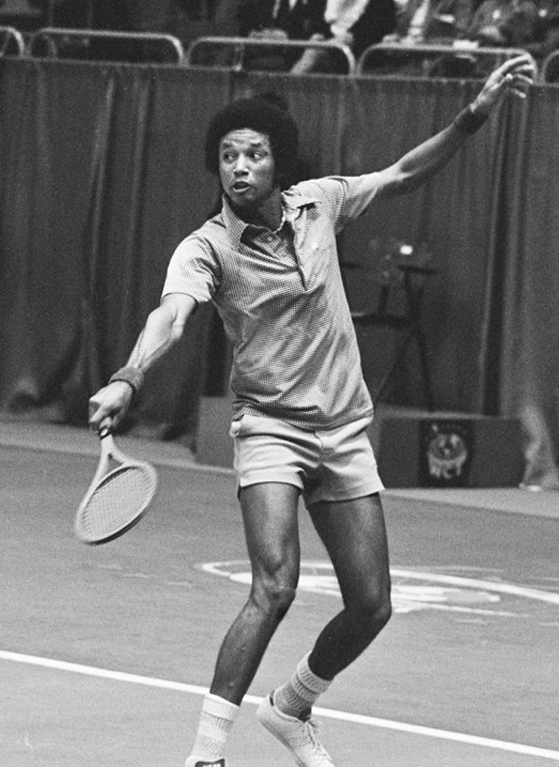
January 28, 1970: Black tennis star Ashe barred from South Africa

January 15, 1970: Breakaway Republic of Biafra ceases to exist

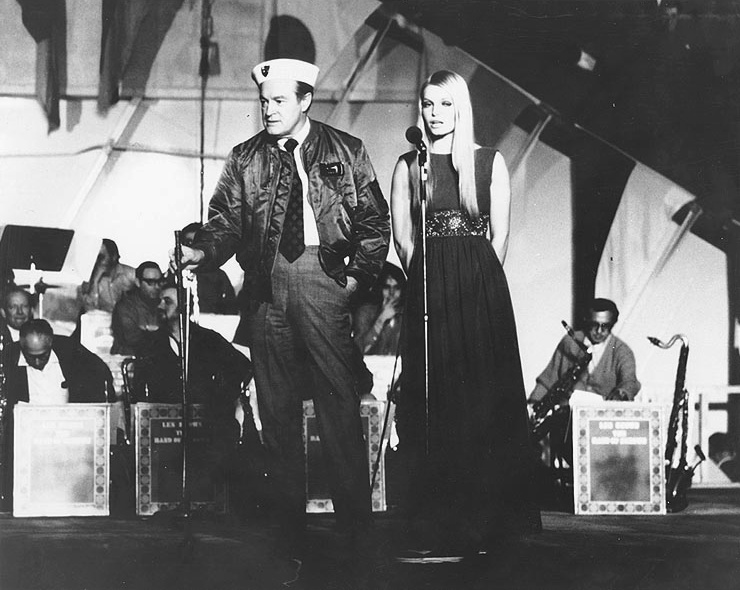
January 15, 1970: Bob Hope TV special draws record ratings

The following events occurred in January 1970:

== January 1, 1970 (Thursday) ==
- The epoch of the Unix time standard for timestamps in computer programming is at 00:00:00 UTC on this date.
- In Dallas, the University of Texas Longhorns, ranked No. 1 in the nation by the Associated Press, won the Cotton Bowl game, 21 to 17, in the final two minutes against the No. 9 ranked Fighting Irish of the University of Notre Dame. The win allowed the Longhorns, already voted No. 1 in the final UPI poll, to stay unbeaten at with 11 wins and no losses or ties. The No. 2 ranked Penn State Nittany Lions also finished unbeaten, at 11–0–0, with a 10 to 3 victory in the Orange Bowl over the No. 6 University of Missouri Tigers.
- The National Environmental Policy Act (NEPA) was signed into law by U.S. President Richard M. Nixon, and went into effect as the first comprehensive environmental protection legislation of the 1970s.
- Died: Alfred Lauck Parson, 80, British physicist and chemist known for proposing the toroidal ring model for subatomic particles, known as the Parson magneton

== January 2, 1970 (Friday) ==
- California became the first of the 50 United States to permit "no-fault divorce", in which a divorce could be granted without the petitioner having to allege misconduct on the part of his or her spouse. Other states would enact similar legislation, with dissolution of marriage being allowed simply on grounds of "irreconcilable differences" between the two partners. The Family Law Act applied to all pending divorce cases filed under the old law, as well as the new ones filed for dissolution, which became the preferred term. The law had gone into effect the day before, but courts were not open for proceedings on the holiday. On the first domestic court hearings in Los Angeles County on January 5, a record number of marriages were ordered ended in a single day, with the average time for a hearing being "less than two minutes per case".
- Clifton R. Wharton Jr. became the first African-American to serve as president of a major state university, taking office as president of Michigan State University.
- Born: Oksana Omelianchik, Soviet gymnast and three-time gold medalist at the 1985 World Championships; in Ulan-Ude, Russian SFSR, Soviet Union

== January 3, 1970 (Saturday) ==
- At 8:14 p.m. local time, a large meteor entered the Earth's atmosphere over central Oklahoma and broke into fragments. The largest piece was a 22.6 lb (10.3 kg) meteorite that was the first whose fall was captured on film by multiple camera stations. Four of the 16 stations in the Prairie Meteorite Network, operated by the Smithsonian Institution, had photographed the meteorite's descent. Using triangulation, astronomers at the Smithsonian Astrophysical Observatory determined that the object's impact had been near Lost City, Oklahoma. On January 9, using the coordinates from the observatory, the camera network's field manager, Gunther Schwartz, located the object on a snow-covered dirt road near Lost City.
- The final recording of a song by The Beatles took place at the Abbey Road Studios in London for inclusion on the group's last released album, Let It Be, as Paul McCartney, George Harrison and Ringo Starr completed a song written by Harrison, "I Me Mine".
- Edwarda O'Bara, a 16-year-old U.S. high school student in Miami, went into a 42-year coma after suffering insulin shock while being treated for diabetes and pneumonia. She would never emerge from a vegetative state and would die on November 21, 2012.
- The body of Sister Catherine Cesnik, who had been missing since November 7, was found in a wooded area in the Baltimore County community of Lansdowne, Maryland. More than 47 years later, a controversial documentary television series, The Keepers would be aired by Netflix about the crime, which remains unsolved.
- The Texas Longhorns were voted the NCAA college football champions for the 1969 season in the Associated Press poll of sportswriters, receiving 910 points on a weighted system where a first place vote was worth 20 points, a second place vote good for 18 points, and 15th place worth one point. Two other unbeaten and untied teams, the Penn State Nittany Lions (822 points) and the USC Trojans (695 points) were ranked second and third in the final poll of the year.
- The tenth and final Playoff Bowl, a postseason game to determine third place in the National Football League and to raise money for the NFL's pension fund, was played in Miami. Before a crowd of 31,151 in the 72,000-seat Orange Bowl stadium, the Los Angeles Rams defeated the Dallas Cowboys, 31 to 0. Initially, the game had matched the second-place finishers in the Eastern and Western Conferences; in later years, the game was a matchup between the losers in the semifinals.
- British actor Jon Pertwee made his first appearance as the third version of Doctor Who in the classic science fiction series, succeeding Patrick Troughton, Pertwee was introduced in part one of Spearhead from Space.
- Died: Robert B. Sinclair, 64, American Broadway stage and film director, was stabbed to death by a burglar in his home.

== January 4, 1970 (Sunday) ==
- In Houston, NASA's Deputy Chief George M. Low announced a revision in the Apollo Moon exploration schedule, and the cancellation of the Apollo 20 lunar landing that would have taken place in 1975 at the Tycho crater. A historian would note later, it was "the shortest-lived Apollo landing mission, being cancelled almost as soon as the planning document was published." Low said instead that Apollo 13, 14, 15 and 16 would land before the end of 1971; that the Apollo program would be paused for the launch of the Skylab space station in July 1972, and subsequent missions to Skylab running through March 1973; and that Apollo 17, 18 and 19, with longer stays on the Moon, would take place in 1973 and 1974. According to the original NASA schedule for future launches, Apollo 20 would have been launched in December 1972 and would have landed at the Copernicus crater with astronauts Don Lind, Jack Lousma and Stuart Roosa. Roosa would later pilot the Apollo 14 mission, Lousma would pilot the Skylab 3 mission, and Lind would be a mission specialist on a 1985 flight of space shuttle Challenger. Apollo 19 was rescheduled by Low for December 1973, but would be canceled by NASA on September 2. Eventually, Apollo 17, the final crewed lunar landing, would be launched on December 7, 1972.
- In Argentina, the city of Mendoza was deluged by a flash flood after a dam burst, and more than 30 people drowned.
- The last game of the American Football League was played as the Kansas City Chiefs beat the Oakland Raiders, 17 to 7, to win the final AFL championship and to gain the right to meet the Minnesota Vikings in the Super Bowl. The Vikings beat the Cleveland Browns, 27 to 7, to win the last National Football League title.
- Keith Moon, drummer for the classic rock band The Who, ran over and killed his bodyguard and chauffeur, Neil Boland, after getting intoxicated and fleeing from a hostile crowd of English youths in Hatfield, Hertfordshire. Boland had driven Moon's Bentley automobile to Hatfield so that Moon, his wife and two friends could attend the opening of the Red Lion discothèque, and Boland had gotten out to the car to keep the crowd away. The death of Boland, who was dragged underneath the Bentley while Moon was trying to drive away from the scene, was ruled to be an accident by investigators, and Moon, who would die of a drug overdose in 1978, was never charged with a crime.
- Born:
  - Basil Iwanyk, American film producer and founder of Thunder Road Films; in Teaneck, New Jersey
  - Chris Kanyon (ring name for Christopher Klucsarits), American pro wrestler who worked for WCW and WWF; in Queens, New York City (d. of drug overdose, 2010)
- Died: David John Williams, 84, Welsh nationalist and Welsh-language writer

== January 5, 1970 (Monday) ==
- A 7.1 magnitude earthquake struck China's Yunnan province less than a minute after 1:00 in the morning local time (1700 UTC on 4 January). The Chinese government did not acknowledge the disaster until four days later, when Radio Peking reported that the local populace was acting "in the revolutionary spirit, fearing neither hardship nor death" and that "the people creatively applied the thoughts of Mao Tse-tung and fought the natural disaster all in one heart and with 100-fold confidence." According to statistics later released by the People's Republic of China, the quake killed 14,621 people in Kunming and surrounding Tonghai County, and injured 26,783.

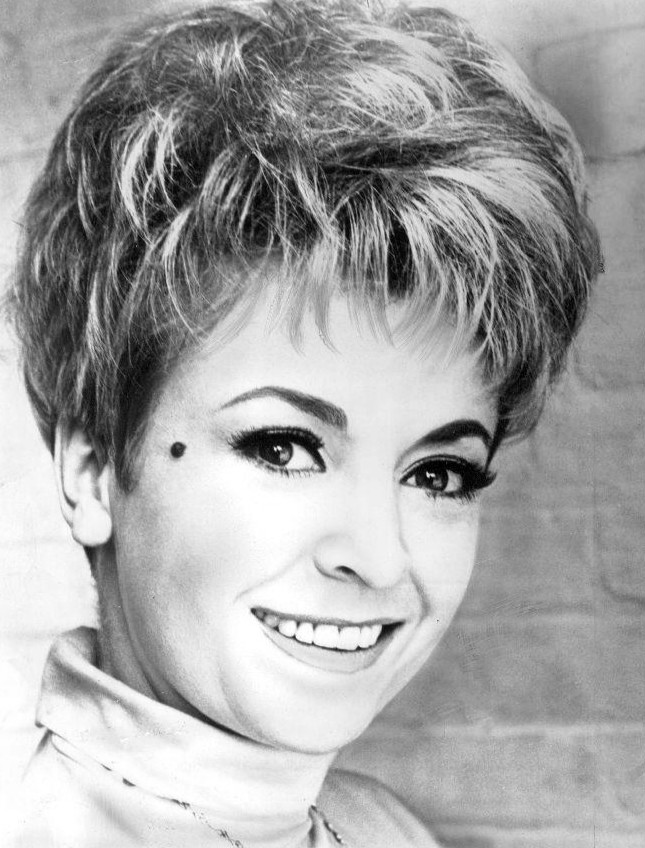
Rosemary Prinz

- The first episode of the American soap opera All My Children was introduced on the ABC television network. The show billed itself as "the first daytime television serial to deal with current controversial political and social issues" and starred Rosemary Prinz (a veteran of the soap As the World Turns) as "Amy Tyler... a liberal political activist dedicated to the peace movement, who married into a conservative family with considerable wealth and stature." The show would run for more than 41 years on ABC, with a final broadcast on September 23, 2011.
- The bodies of defeated United Mine Workers of America presidential candidate Jock Yablonski, his wife, and his 25-year-old daughter, were found at the Yablonski home in the community of Clarksville, Pennsylvania. Mr. Yablonski had not been seen since New Year's Eve. All three victims had been shot to death. Three suspects would be arrested on January 21, which would be traced to UMW President Tony Boyle.
- The American merchant freighter SS Badger State, formerly the U.S. Navy transport ship USS Starlight, sank in the Pacific Ocean. Ten days earlier, it had exploded while carrying a cargo of artillery shells and bombs, killing 26 of its crew of 40.
- Died:
  - Max Born, 87, West German physicist and 1954 Nobel Prize winner for his interpretation of the wave function in quantum mechanics
  - Cyril Fagan, 73, Irish-born American astrologer

== January 6, 1970 (Tuesday) ==
- Prince Norodom Sihanouk, the absolute monarch and head of state of the southeast Asian nation of Cambodia, departed for France for medical treatment. Sihanouk, who had reserved the entire first class section of the regular Air France flight from Phnom Penh to Paris (for both Monday and Tuesday), stopped in Rome to meet his trusted prime minister, Lon Nol, who was returning to Cambodia after his own medical treatment in France. Sihanouk said that he would return to Cambodia in mid-March; on March 18, however, Lon Nol would lead a coup d'état overthrowing the Prince and abolishing the monarchy.
- Born:
  - Julie Chen Moonves, American television news anchor, reality show hostess for Big Brother, and former co-host of The Talk; in Queens, New York City
  - Keenan McCardell, American football wide receiver who played 17 consecutive seasons in the NFL; in Houston

== January 7, 1970 (Wednesday) ==
- The "War of Attrition", between Egypt and Israel after the Six-Day War of June 1967, took a different turn that would lead to the involvement of the Soviet Union in the Middle East. At 2:00 in the afternoon, Israeli Air Force jets began Operation Priha, a series of bombing raids deep into Egypt east of the Suez Canal. The first three targets were a training camp at Dahshur, south of Cairo; the Tell El Kebir airfield near the Canal; and the nuclear research facility at Inshas. Egypt's President Gamal Abdel Nasser traveled to Moscow to request Russian intervention, and after the deaths of several Soviet military advisers in a January 28 raid, the USSR would send additional troops to co-ordinate anti-aircraft defense.
- The Kaizer Chiefs F.C. professional soccer football club was founded in the Soweto township of Johannesburg, South Africa. Kaizer Motaung, a black soccer football star who had become well known in the United States with the Atlanta Chiefs pro soccer team, created the Kaizer Chiefs to compete with another Soweto team, the Orlando Pirates. The two clubs would become founding members of the National Professional Soccer League in 1971, and then would be part of the merger between the all-nonwhite NPSL and South Africa's all-white pro soccer circuit, the National Football League, in 1977.
- A controversial episode on the CBS police drama Hawaii Five-O was broadcast for the first and only time. Titled, "Bored, She Hung Herself", the evening's offering was about a girl who was believed to have hanged herself but, "was she under the diabolic influence of her mystic boyfriends— or was it murder?" The theme of erotic asphyxiation was described for the first time on television. After a viewer "died trying the same technique", the show was never rebroadcast and would be omitted from the syndicated reruns of the popular series. In 2007, Paramount Home Video would release a set of DVDs packaged as "Hawaii Five-O: The Second Season", purposely omitting the word "complete"; and in 2013, the set of Blu-ray discs for Season 2 would come with the disclaimer that the 1970 episode "has not been re-broadcast or released in any manner since its original airing and is not included in this collection" because of "viewer reaction following the original telecast."
- Born: Andy Burnham, British politician, Prime Minister of the United Kingdom (2026–present), in Aintree
- Died: Robert Barrat, 80, American character actor on film who portrayed sheriffs and military officers; he also appeared in films as Abraham Lincoln, Zachary Taylor and Douglas MacArthur

== January 8, 1970 (Thursday) ==
- Discussions between the United States of America and the People's Republic of China were initiated in Warsaw between the ambassadors to Poland from the two nations. Walter J. Stoessel Jr., the American ambassador, was invited to the Chinese Embassy by that nation's ambassador, Lei Yang. U.S. President Nixon and his National Security Adviser, Henry Kissinger directed Stoessel to make clear to Lei that Nixon wanted a serious dialogue with the Communist Chinese government, and that in order to keep the discussions flexible and confidential, the U.S. was prepared to send a representative to Beijing, or to receive a Chinese representative in Washington.
- Born:
  - Adam Reed, American animation producer known for creating Archer; in Asheville, North Carolina
  - Nick Miller, British meteorologist for BBC; in Denham, Buckinghamshire
- Died: Jani Christou, 44, Greek composer, was killed in a car accident in Athens while returning from a celebration of his birthday.

== January 9, 1970 (Friday) ==
- Fifty people died in Ecuador when the ferryboat they were on sank in shark-infested waters during a crossing of the Gulf of Guayaquil.
- Thirty-two elderly patients were killed in a fire at the Harmer House Center nursing home in Marietta, Ohio. Reportedly, state regulators had deemed the fire-resistant construction to be "so good that no sprinkler system was required." Nearly all of the victims died of smoke inhalation from the burning of the facility's carpet and its rubber backing. Investigators later testified before the U.S. Senate that the fire had started in a patient's room when a cigarette was dropped into a wastebasket, and that it spread because nursing home personnel failed to close the door to Room 104 after evacuating the resident, allowing drafts to spread the flames.
- Born: Lara Fabian, Belgian-born singer and songwriter; as Lara Crokaert in Etterbeek

== January 10, 1970 (Saturday) ==
- The Church of Jesus Christ of Latter-day Saints (LDS Church) announced publicly that it would continue to exclude people of African descent from being able to serve as priests in the LDS Church. Specifically, the President of the church, David O. McKay, had distributed a statement on December 15 to high ranking church officers reaffirming Mormon doctrine expressed in The Pearl of Great Price, stating that nonwhite people "were not yet ready to receive the priesthood, for reasons which we believe are known to God, but which He has not made fully known to man.” In an accompanying statement, McKay also wrote that "Sometime in God's eternal plan, the Negro will be given the right to hold the priesthood." President McKay passed away eight days later. In 1978, the church leaders would announce the 1978 Revelation on Priesthood, removing the bar against the black people serving as Mormon priests.
- The launch of the first insured American space rocket was aborted at the last moment after the countdown had reached zero. The successful launch of the Delta M booster rocket was covered by a casualty and liability insurance policy that would pay for damages if the rocket failed and damaged its payload, a commercial communications satellite. The event also marked the first time that a launch sequence was automatically shut down by a system on the rocket, rather than by the people at NASA ground control in Cape Kennedy. Although satellite insurance had been provided against damage to payloads for more than four years, the launch rockets themselves had never been covered. The Intelsat 3-6 was successfully launched five days later.
- Died:
  - Pavel Belyayev, 44, Soviet cosmonaut and commander of 1965 Voskhod 2 mission; from complications from surgery
  - Babbis Friis-Baastad, 48, Norwegian children's writer

== January 11, 1970 (Sunday) ==
- The last American Football League champions, the Kansas City Chiefs, upset the heavily favored NFL champion Minnesota Vikings, 23–7, in Super Bowl IV.
- General Odumegwu Ojukwu, President of Biafra, fled from the secessionist state that he had created flying out of Uli, the republic's only airfield, minutes before Nigerian bombers arrived to cut off the airfield. Ojukwu claimed in a pre-recorded radio broadcast that he was "traveling out of Biafra to explore with our friends all the new peace proposals further", and placed Major General Philip Effiong in command of the government before leaving. Ojukwu went into exile in the nearby Republic of the Ivory Coast (Côte d'Ivoire) and was granted political asylum by Ivorian President Félix Houphouët-Boigny. Ojukwu would remain in exile until 1982, returning to Nigeria after being pardoned by Nigerian President Shehu Shagari.
- Died: Charles H. Tweed, 74, pioneering American orthodontist

== January 12, 1970 (Monday) ==
- After a 32-month fight for independence from Nigeria, Biafran forces under Philip Effiong surrendered to General Yakubu Gowon, bringing an end to the Nigerian Civil War. General Effiong made the surrender formal three days later in a meeting with Nigeria's President Yakubu Gowon, where the two hugged at a military barracks in Lagos.
- In one of Australia's most famous mysteries, Cheryl Grimmer, a three-year-old girl, was kidnapped from a beach in Wollongong, New South Wales. A suspect would be arrested 47 years later, based on a confession that he had made in a police interview after the crime, but the charges were dropped after a judge ruled that the confession could not be admitted into evidence at the trial.
- A group of 380 people (361 passengers and 19 crew) became the first to travel a commercial flight on the new Boeing 747, making a chartered Pan American World Airways flight from New York to London in what was described as "a dress rehearsal for regular service."
- La Residencia, a horror film filmed entirely in Spain, opened in Spanish cities and quickly became the most popular movie in that nation's history. Produced by Arturo González and written and directed by Narciso Ibáñez Serrador. During 1970, it would gross Pts45 million Spanish pesetas (roughly $640,000 U.S. dollars) in its first six months and more than one million dollars by the end of the year.
- Gravediggers walked out on strike in New York City and parts of Long Island and Westchester County. The 1,700 members of the Cemetery Workers Union (CWU), Local 365, had previously staged a three-week walkout in 1967. For the next seven weeks, the CWU members refused to provide services for 44 cemeteries. An exception was made by the union for the burial of U.S. servicemen killed in Vietnam, and for Orthodox Jewish ceremonies (in order to comply with halakha tradition of burial to take place within 24 hours of death). Before the strike ended on March 8, between 5,000 and 15,000 bodies had gone unburied and had been "stored above ground in vaults, crypts and under canvas".
- The day after Super Bowl IV, the Pro Football Hall of Fame announced that it would induct Jack Christiansen, Tom Fears, Hugh McElhenny and Pete Pihos.
- Born:
  - Zack de la Rocha, American musician and lead singer for Rage Against the Machine; in Long Beach, California
  - Raekwon (stage name for Corey Woods), American rapper and member of East Coast hip hop group Wu-Tang Clan; in Brooklyn, New York City

== January 13, 1970 (Tuesday) ==
- A tower guard shot and killed three African-American prisoners at the California Correctional Training Facility in Soledad, California, more commonly called the "Soledad State Prison." Opie G. Miller fired into the crowd of black and white inmates who were fighting in the prison's exercise yard on the first day of the forcible integration of prisoners at the prison's maximum security "O Wing." W.L. Nolen and Cleveland Edwards died immediately, and Alvin Miller died in the prison's hospital. Billy D. Harris, a white inmate, survived his wounds. Three days later, John V. Mills, a prison guard at the medium security section of Soledad's "Y Wing", was beaten and then thrown to his death from the third floor of the cell block. The killing came soon after the prisoners heard news that the Monterey County District Attorney announced that the death of the three prisoners was "justifiable homicide". The three inmates indicted for Mills's murder would later become known as the Soledad Brothers.
- Fifty-eight people were killed in two separate airline crashes on the same day. A Faucett Airlines DC-4 disappeared in Peru while en route from Trujillo to Juanjui. Earlier, a DC-3, described as the only aircraft owned by Polynesian Airlines, crashed on takeoff from Apia Faleolo airport, killing all 27 passengers and three crew in its attempt to fly to Pago Pago.
- NASA Administrator Thomas O. Paine announced further changes in the American crewed space program because of a reduced budget, including the layoff of 50,000 NASA employees over the next 12 months, and a halt in further production of the Saturn V rocket needed to break Earth orbit to make a trip to the Moon.
- Born: Shonda Rhimes, American television producer and creator of Grey's Anatomy; in Chicago
- Died: Harry MacGregor Woods, 74, American songwriter known for "I'm Looking Over a Four Leaf Clover" and "When the Red Red Robin Comes Bob Bobbin' Along"; after being struck by a car in Phoenix, Arizona

== January 14, 1970 (Wednesday) ==
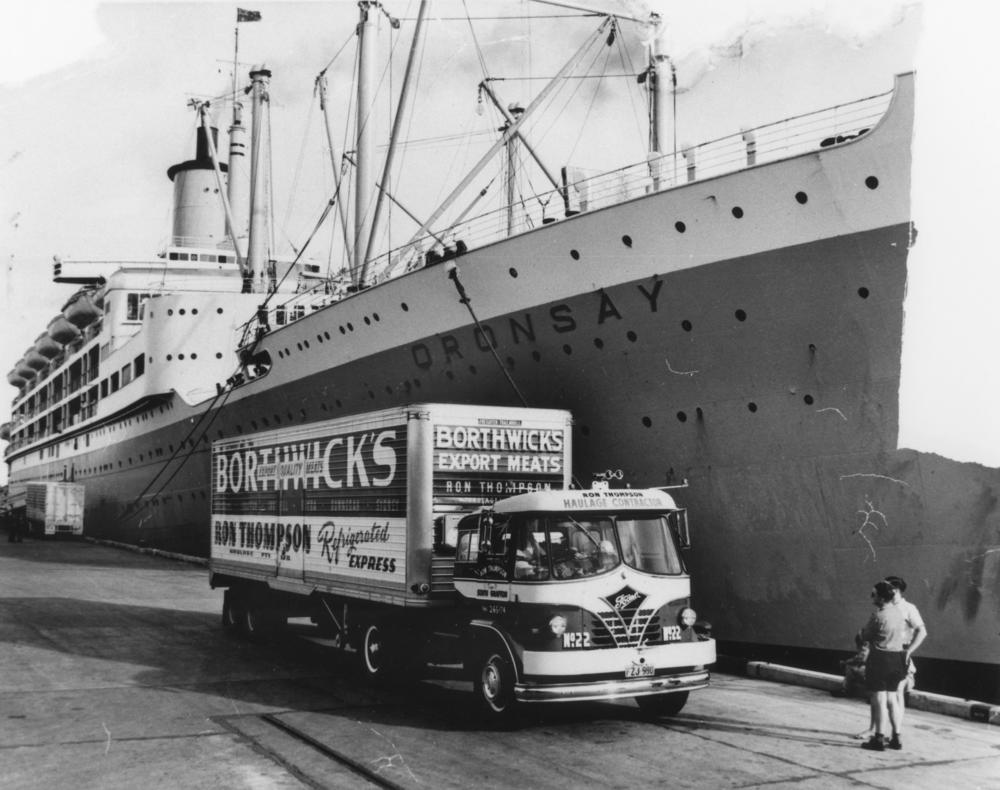
Typhoid ship SS Oronsay

- With more than 20 suspected cases of typhoid fever among its passengers and crew, the luxury ocean liner SS Oronsay was placed under quarantine after arriving in Vancouver harbor, partway through its round-the-world cruise. Although 154 Vancouver-bound passengers were allowed to leave for examination, the remaining 991 passengers and the 500 crew members were prohibited from disembarking until further notice. Most would spend the next three weeks on the ship while it sat at port. A spokesman for the Vancouver health department branded SS Oronsay "a floating bomb". The ship had departed London on December 16 for a four-month cruise and the disease was discovered after some of the crew were hospitalized in Los Angeles. In all, 70 people were hospitalized. About 700 passengers would be confined to the ship until it would finally sail out of Vancouver on February 4
- The United States Supreme Court ordered the last 14 legally segregated school districts in the United States to integrate by February 1, reversing a lower court ruling that would have permitted them to wait until the beginning of the 1970–1971 school year. The largest segregated school districts were those of Mobile County, Alabama (with 73,504 students) the 67,000 students in the Birmingham suburbs of Jefferson County, Alabama, and the public schools of Jackson, Mississippi. The other 11 districts were in Holly Springs, Mississippi; Bessemer, Alabama; Burke County, Bibb County and Houston County, Georgia; Bay County and Alachua County, Florida; and West Feliciana Parish, East Feliciana Parish and Concordia Parish in Louisiana.
- Diana Ross and The Supremes performed their farewell live concert together at the Frontier Hotel in Las Vegas. The last performance of the trio of Ross, Mary Wilson and Cindy Birdsong was of their final No. 1 bestselling song, "Someday We'll Be Together". Ross would begin her solo career on February 12, in Vancouver, and her place on The Supremes would be filled by Jean Terrell, who was introduced onstage during the final show. Excerpts of the concert would be included on the group's final album, Farewell, released in April.
- Born: Gene Snitsky U.S. pro wrestler for WWE, stuntman and actor; in Nesquehoning, Pennsylvania
- Died: Ma Hongkui, 77, Chinese Army general during World War II and warlord of the Ningxia (Ning-hsia) province until the Communist revolution of 1949

== January 15, 1970 (Thursday) ==
- At the Dodan Barracks in Lagos, the Nigerian Civil War formally came to an end as the remaining commander of the Biafran rebels, Major-General Philip Effiong, appeared before Nigerian President Yakubu Gowon and declared on behalf of the breakaway government "That we affirm that we are loyal Nigerian citizens and accept the authority of the Federal Military Government of Nigeria. That we accept the existing administrative and political structure of the Federation of Nigeria. That any future constitutional arrangement will be worked out by representatives of the people of Nigeria. That the Republic of Biafra hereby ceases to exist. Later in the day, President Gowon went on the radio and told listeners, "We guarantee the personal safety of everyone who submits to the federal authority," and provided for the government's National Rehabilitation Commission to provide relief for the victims of the war. During more than three and a half years of war, an estimated 45,000 Biafran rebel soldiers and 30,000 civilians were killed in battle (along with 45,000 Nigerian government troops), and 500,000 civilians in the Biafra territory died of starvation.
- "The Bob Hope Christmas Special", with clips of comedian Hope's star-studded Christmas visit to South Vietnam, set a record for most viewers of an entertainment show on television, with a Nielsen rating of 46.6 (referring to 46.6% of the 58,500,000 television sets in the U.S.), and viewed in 27,260,000 American homes.
- Will Owen, a British Member of Parliament who had represented Morpeth in the House of Commons since 1954, was arrested on charges of espionage and ordered held in gaol without bond. In addition to his parliamentary duties, Owen was the chairman of a Mayfair travel agency, Berolina, that specialized in tourism in East Germany. Jock Wilson, the Commander of Scotland Yard, personally placed Owen under arrest on charges of communicating information "useful to an enemy" between 1961 and 1969.
- Michael James Brody Jr., who had inherited $26,000,000 at the age of 21, announced at a press conference in New York City that he intended to give away a large part of his fortune to anyone who "needed the money bad enough" to come to his rented home in Scarsdale, New York. After three days of giving away thousands of dollars to strangers, he called a halt to the plan and said that he had made the announcement while he was "tripped out on drugs."
- First Lady Pat Nixon broke a bottle of champagne on the nose of the first Boeing 747 and christened the Pan American World Airways acquisition "Young America".

== January 16, 1970 (Friday) ==
- Colonel Muammar Gaddafi, the 27-year old officer who had led the revolution that established the Libyan Arab Republic the previous September 1, named himself as the new Prime Minister of Libya, forcing out civilian lawyer Mahmud Suleiman Maghribi. Gaddafi was already the nation's head of state as chairman of the Revolutionary Council.
- Curt Flood, center fielder for baseball's St. Louis Cardinals, filed a lawsuit in federal court against Major League Baseball, the National League and the American League, and all 24 teams to argue that the "reserve clause" in all MLB players' contracts (which allowed teams to reserve the exclusive right to re-negotiate with a player after his contract had expired) was illegal. Flood's lawsuit would ultimately be unsuccessful, but did pave the way for the players' union to challenge the clause, leading to its elimination by an arbitrator in 1975 and leading to "free agency"—the right to negotiate with the highest bidder after one's contract with a team had expired—for players in baseball and in other professional sports. Flood, who had said in a TV interview two weeks earlier, "I’m a well-paid slave, but nonetheless a slave," premised the suit against the reserve clause not only on American anti-trust law, but on the Thirteenth Amendment prohibition against involuntary servitude and slavery.
- Thelma Elkjer, the secretary for NFL Commissioner Pete Rozelle, completed the National Football League's post-merger realignment with a random drawing, bring an end to a contentious owners' meeting that had lasted for almost 65 consecutive hours. Rozelle had settled on five different possible alignments of the three divisions of the 13-team National Football Conference, and Mrs. Elkjer's selection of plan number 3 from a flower vase set the precedent for Detroit, Chicago, Green Bay and Minnesota to be in the same division from then on.

== January 17, 1970 (Saturday) ==
- The American Football League staged its final event as a league separate from the National Football League, as the AFL's West Division stars beat the East Division stars, 26 to 3, at the AFL All-Star Game in Houston.
- Born:
  - Genndy Tartakovsky, Russian-born American animator, creator of Dexter's Laboratory, Samurai Jack and Star Wars: Clone Wars; in Moscow
  - Jeremy Roenick, American ice hockey player who played 18 seasons in the National Hockey League; in Boston
- Died:
  - U.S. Army Specialist Four Donald P. Sloat, 20, was killed in the Que Son Valley of South Vietnam when he used his body to shield the rest of his platoon from the explosion of an enemy grenade. Sloat, a resident of Coweta, Oklahoma, would posthumously be awarded the Medal of Honor almost 45 years after his death.
  - Joseph Civello, 67, American mobster

== January 18, 1970 (Sunday) ==
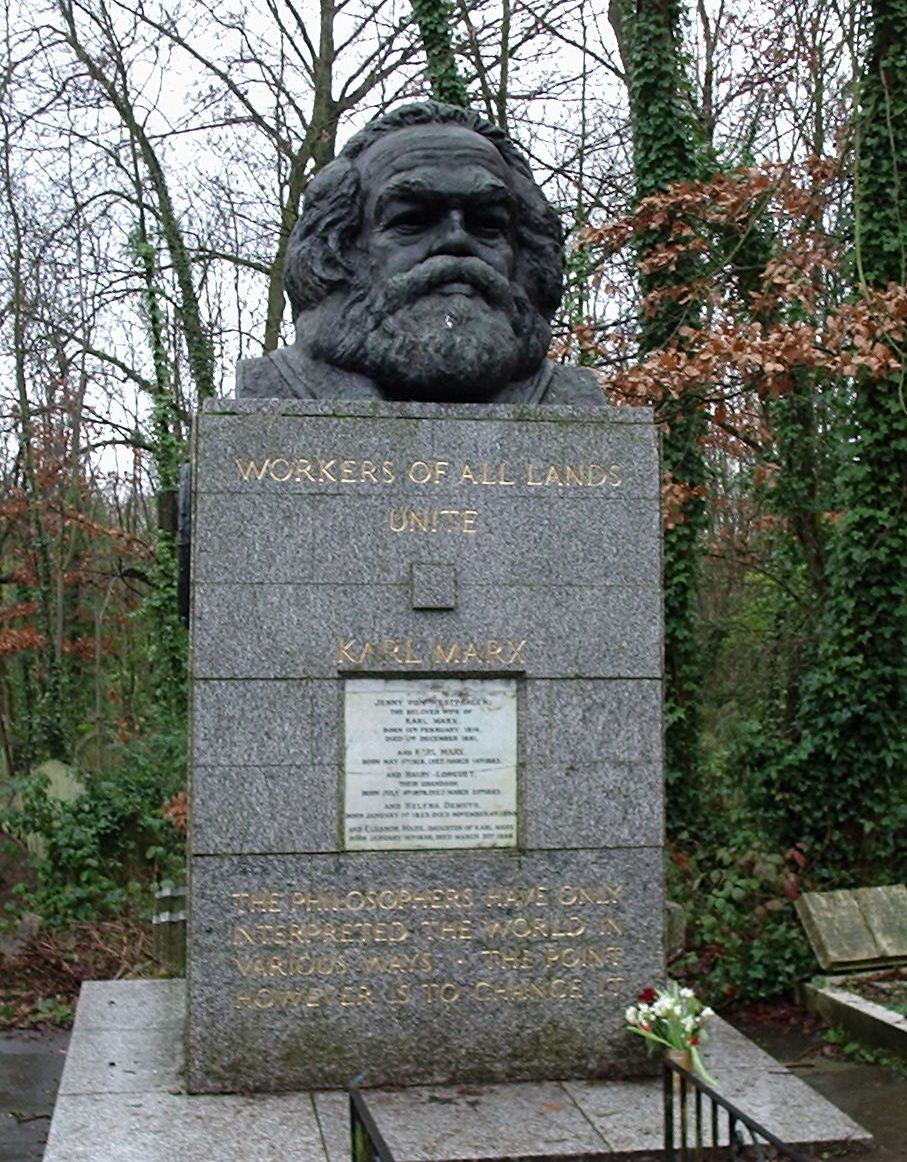
Karl Marx's tomb

- The Tomb of Karl Marx was vandalized by explosives placed by unknown perpetrators at Highgate Cemetery in London. Although Marx, a German economist whose theories became the basis for the planned economies used in Communist nations, had died in 1893, the 12-foot high memorial had more recently been created in 1956. More than 45 years later, a London newspaper, the Camden New Journal, would report that the vandals' apparent plan had been to saw an opening in the face of the memorial (a bust of Marx's head) and to fill the hollow shell with explosives. Although the nose was partially sawed through, the participants went to a second plan and set off the bomb in front of the monument instead.
- A full-page advertisement in The New York Times was taken out by a group called "The Environmental Teach-In, Inc.", with the slogan "April 22. Earth Day." in preparation for the first United States nationwide event to call attention to the ecological crisis that was facing the world. "A disease has infected our country," the text said, "It has brought smog to Yosemite, dumped garbage in the Hudson, sprayed DDT in our food, and left our cities in decay. Its carrier is man." Seeking contributions for what has now become an annual event, the Environmental Teach-In went on to say "On April 22 we start to reclaim the environment we have wrecked."
- Born:
  - Keisha Lance Bottoms, American politician, Governor-elect of Georgia, 60th Mayor of Atlanta (2018-2022), in Atlanta
  - DJ Quik (stage name for David Marvin Blake), American rapper, songwriter and DJ; in Compton, California
- Died: David O. McKay, 96, President of the Church of Jesus Christ of Latter-day Saints since 1951. During his presidency, the number of Mormon members of the church almost tripled in size to 2,800,000.

== January 19, 1970 (Monday) ==
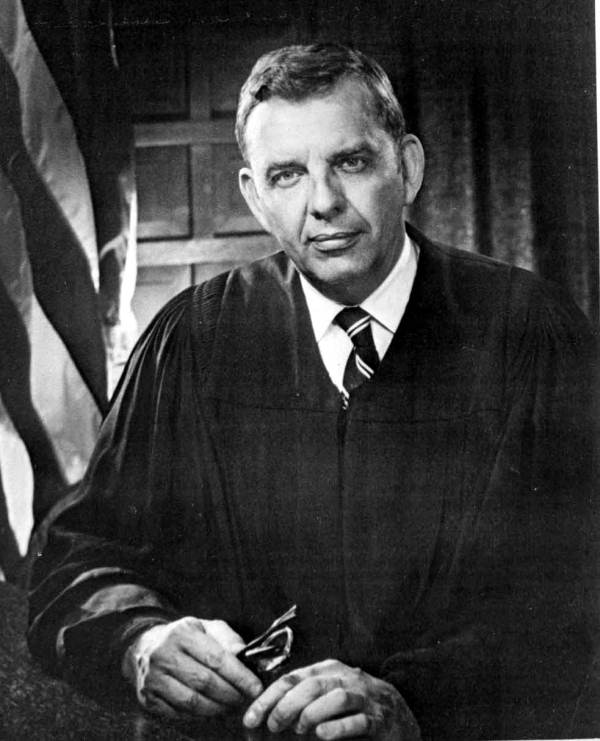
Harrold Carswell

- G. Harrold Carswell, a Florida judge for the U.S. Fifth Circuit Court of Appeals, was nominated by U.S. President Nixon to fill the vacancy on the United States Supreme Court that had been created by the resignation of Abe Fortas. Although the U.S. Department of Justice and the FBI had done a background check that concluded that Carswell had no financial scandals like Fortas or Nixon's previous nominee, Clement Haynsworth, the vetting failed to note that Carswell had other problems. Within two days, a reporter at a Jacksonville, Florida TV station, WJXT, located a published 1948 speech where Carswell had declared that "I yield to no man... in the firm, vigorous belief in the principles of white supremacy" Carswell responded with a statement that he "specifically and categorically" renounced and rejected the words and the thoughts because they were "obnoxious and abhorrent" Two months later, U.S. Senate hearings revealed that more than half of Judge Carswell's rulings were reversed on appeal, leading to the odd defense by U.S. Senator Roman Hruska that "even if he were mediocre, there are a lot of mediocre judges and people and lawyers. Aren't they entitled to a little representation and a little chance?" Carswell's nomination would fail to win the approval of the U.S. Senate in the vote taken on April 8.
- Universidad Simón Bolívar, which would become the national scientific and technical university of Venezuela, was opened in a ceremony presided over by President Rafael Caldera. With the motto of "The University of the Future" (La Universidad del Futuro), USB has a main campus at Baruta near Caracas, and an enrollment of 15,000.
- Born: Tim Foster, English rower and 2000 Olympic gold medalist; in Bedford
- Died:
  - James B. Donovan, 53, American lawyer who arranged the swap of Rudolf Abel for Francis Gary Powers in 1962; from heart failure
  - Aldo De Benedetti, 77, Italian screenwriter who wrote more than 100 films in a 38-year career

== January 20, 1970 (Tuesday) ==
- The Super Fight, a simulated boxing bout between Muhammad Ali and the late Rocky Marciano, was shown on pay-per-view in 1,000 movie theaters in North America and around the world. The likely result, of the hypothetical fight between the two former world heavyweight boxing champions, was determined by data inputted to a computer, and enhanced by clips of possible outcomes that the two boxers had filmed during the summer before Marciano's 1969 death in a plane crash. Marciano and Ali (still referred to by the press as Cassius Clay) were, at the time, the only two title holders who had never been defeated. People who paid five dollars apiece for a ticket to the film saw an ending where Marciano "floored Clay for the third time with a solid left hook" and in which "the taller, younger Clay was counted out at 57 of the 13th round."
- Samsung SDI was incorporated in South Korea. The company was created as a new division of the Samsung Group, which had been founded in 1938 as a wholesaler of groceries.
- The Greater London Council announced its plans to build the Thames Barrier at Woolwich to prevent flooding. The barrier would be completed in 1981.
- Born: Edwin McCain, American singer and songwriter; in Charleston, South Carolina

== January 21, 1970 (Wednesday) ==
- The government of Iraq suppressed an attempted coup against President Ahmed Hassan al-Bakr that had started the night before, then arrested, convicted and executed 22 people in the afternoon. Radio Baghdad announced the foiling of the plot at noon. Over the next several hours, a special three-man court meted out the sentences for those found guilty. Civilian plotters were hanged, and military men were shot by a firing squad. Another 18 people were executed the next day.
- A 375 ft (114 m) section of the Chesapeake Bay Bridge was destroyed near Norfolk, Virginia, when the amphibious U.S. Navy cargo ship USS Yancey was blown from its moorings and struck an abutment.
- The first commercial flight of the Boeing 747 "jumbo jet" airplane was scheduled to depart New York's John F. Kennedy International Airport at 7:00 in the evening and boarding began at 45 minutes before takeoff. Two hours later, however, the flight was grounded because an engine overheated while the 747 was waiting in line behind other jets that were anticipating clearance. The aircraft, christened "Young America" a few days earlier by First Lady Pat Nixon, returned to the gate, where the passengers disembarked until a second 747 could be obtained. The substitute airplane, designated as "Clipper Victor", was then renamed Young America, but would not begin boarding until the early hours of the next day.

== January 22, 1970 (Thursday) ==
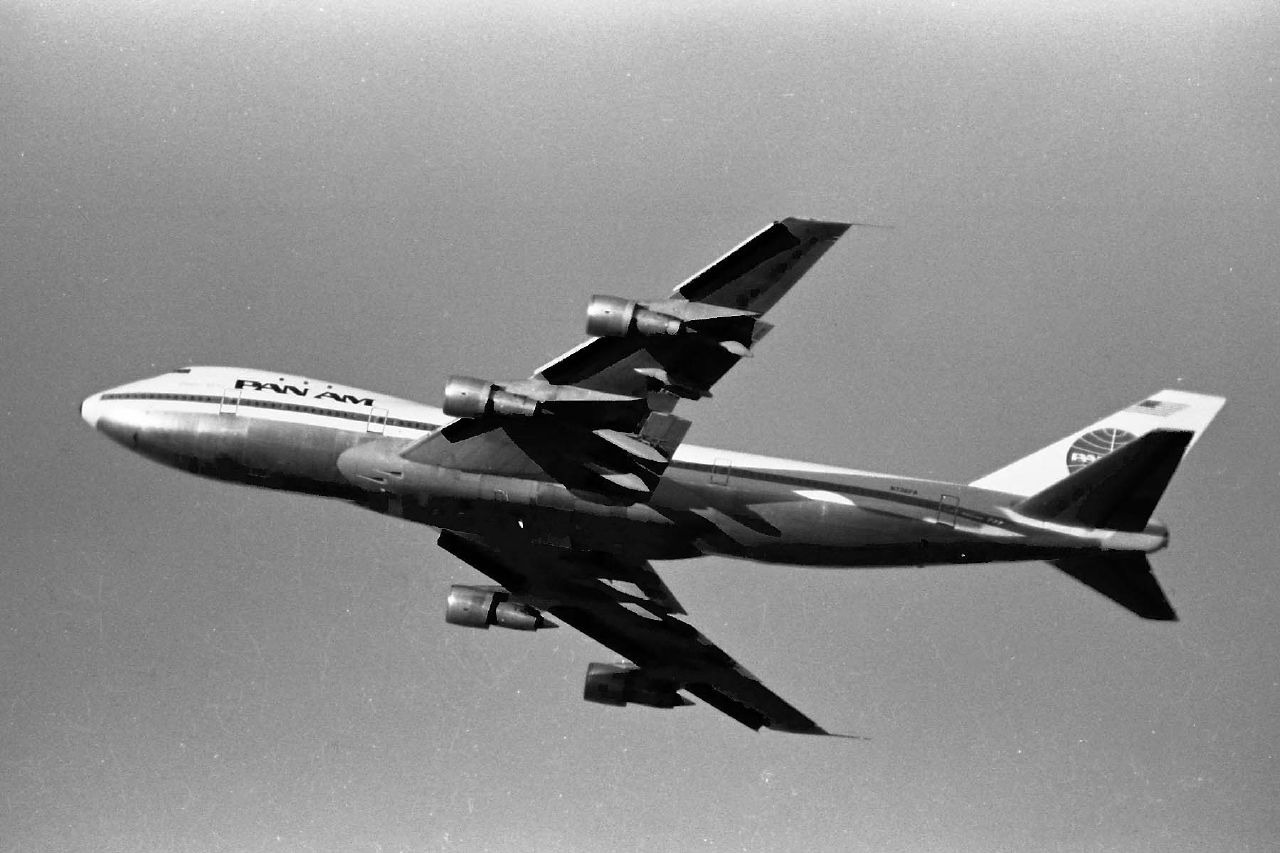
"Clipper Victor", the first commercial 747

- The first scheduled airline flight for the Boeing 747 "jumbo jet", operated by Pan American Airways, departed from New York's John F. Kennedy International Airport at 1:52 in the morning local time (0652 UTC), after a delay of almost seven hours. Pan American Flight 001 was to have started its maiden flight at 7:00 the previous evening. Once aloft, the gigantic airplane carried 332 passengers and a Pan Am crew of 18 to London's Heathrow Airport, where it arrived at 1:05 in the afternoon (1305 UTC). Though the flight had been sold as a round trip, 128 passengers canceled their reservations to return to New York on the 747, "perhaps the greatest number ever compiled by a single airliner."
- Born: Alex Ross, American comic book artist, in Portland, Oregon

== January 23, 1970 (Friday) ==
- The development, by Mexico, of the island of Cancún as a major tourist resort began with the start of construction on the first of nine hotels on an island off of the coast of the Yucatán Peninsula Reportedly, the ideal location for "an ideal Caribbean tourist city and resort" was selected by data sifted by the computer of the Banco de Mexico.
- Australis-OSCAR 5, the first amateur radio satellite that could be controlled from the ground, was launched into orbit from California's Vandenberg Air Force Base. The fifth in the OSCAR series (Orbital Satellite Carrying Amateur Radio), the satellite had been built by a group of University of Melbourne students and was part of a payload that included the new TIROS-M weather satellite. The new generation of orbiting meteorological cameras was designated as ITOS (for Improved TIROS Operational System, itself an abbreviation for "improved television infrared observation satellite operational system").
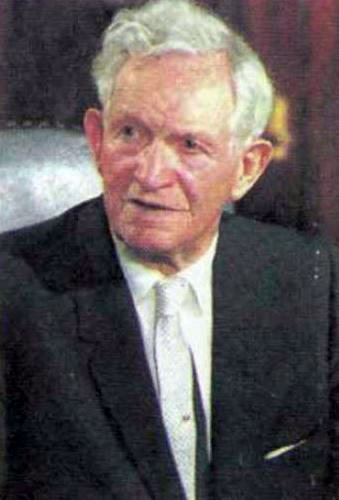
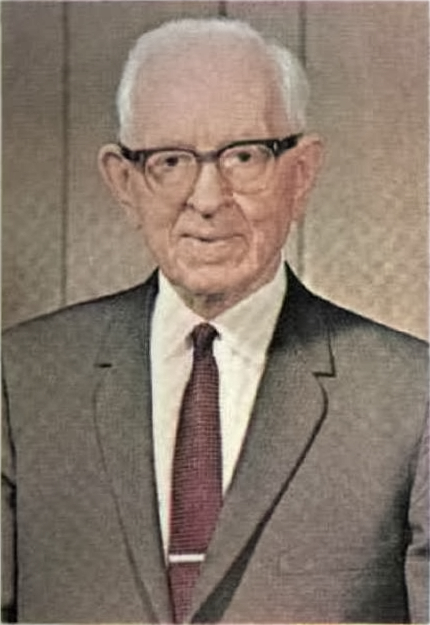
McKay and successor Smith
- Joseph Fielding Smith was chosen as the tenth President of the Church of Jesus Christ of Latter-day Saints, to succeed David O. McKay, who had died on January 18. Smith, 93, was the great-nephew of the Mormon religion's founder Joseph Smith, and the chairman and senior member of the Council of the Twelve Apostles, which selected him. The council's selection was later formalized by ratification from the more than 2.8 million Mormons around the world.

== January 24, 1970 (Saturday) ==
- At Cardiff, the Welsh national rugby union team and the South African national team, the Springboks, played to a 6–6 draw, bringing an end to the 1969–70 South Africa rugby union tour of Britain and Ireland and marking the first time that Wales did not lose to South Africa in international competition. In the final seconds of the match, Gareth Edwards downed the ball across the goal line to score a try (at the time worth 3 points rather than 5) "as if his life depended on it... to the delirious and relieved roar of the Welsh crowd, who could hardly believe their good fortune." Edwards' conversion kick failed, sparing the Springboks from defeat.
- Died: James "Shep" Sheppard, 34, American singer and songwriter known as front man for the group Shep and the Limelites, and for the hit song Daddy's Home. Sheppard was beaten to death by unknown assailants after his car was stopped on the Long Island Expressway. The murder was never solved, but an author would note later that "Sheppard was known to be heavily in debt at the time, and his killers were most likely loan sharks who had been tailing him for months."

== January 25, 1970 (Sunday) ==
- MASH, a film based on the 1968 Richard Hooker bestseller "MASH: A Novel About Three Army Doctors" and the inspiration for the popular TV series M*A*S*H, premiered in New York City before being released nationwide on March 18.
- Nineteen people, most of them Mexican journalists who were reporting on the presidential campaign of Luis Echeverría Álvarez, were killed after following Echeverría's plane to a stop in Poza Rica in the Veracruz state. The group had boarded a government-owned Convair CV-240 at Mexico City, and died when the plane crashed into a hill during its landing approach. Echeverría, who would win the presidential election and serve a six-year term, arrived safely in the other plane.
- Died:
  - Eiji Tsuburaya, 68, Japanese special effects creator and director best known for being the co-creator of the 1954 film Godzilla
  - Esther Eng, 55, American film director and the first female director of Chinese-language films in the United States.
  - Jane Bathori, 92, French operatic mezzo-soprano

== January 26, 1970 (Monday) ==
- The "First Quarter Storm" (Sigwa ng Unang Sangkapat), a period of unprecedented civil uprising in the Philippines against the government of President Ferdinand Marcos, began near the end of a rally that the National Union of Students of the Philippines. The NUSP had been permitted to hold in front of the Congress Building in Manila, where President Marcos was to deliver his annual State of the Union Speech. The NUSP's leader, Edgar Jopson, closed the rally at 5:50 p.m., shortly after Marcos had completed his speech, and the crowd of almost 50,000 people began to disperse. "Unfortunately," as a Philippine Senate committee would report later, "it was only minutes after this that the President came out of the Congress building," and a riot began. On the first evening, at least 300 protesters were injured when security police charged the crowd, many of them with serious head injuries, but none were killed until another demonstration on January 30. Student protests continued for two months in what would later be referred to as FQS. Marcos would declare martial law in 1972.
- U.S. President Richard Nixon cast the first-ever nationally televised veto of legislation at the close of an eleven-minute broadcast. Calling a $19.7 billion appropriation for education "the wrong amount for the wrong purpose, at the wrong time," Nixon then signed the veto message in front of viewers.

== January 27, 1970 (Tuesday) ==
- Fifty-five people were burned to death in the city of Semarang in Indonesia, and another 41 were seriously injured and expected to die, after gasoline from a leaking pipeline ignited. According to reports, 19 people were killed immediately by a blast from the pipeline, and the others were burned as the fire spread across the gasoline-soaked ground.
- A hoax perpetrated by a man who claimed that he had seen "Bigfoot" (also called "Sasquatch") caused a rush of more than 50 American and Canadian bounty hunters to Colville, Washington, in search of the legendary creature. Joe Metlow, a mining prospector, announced that he had seen the 9 ft (2.7 m) tall beast, estimated to weight 1,000 pounds (450 kg) in northern Stevens County, and offered to divulge the location of the sighting in return for a "suitable" payment. By January 30, the hunters searched Stevens County by airplane, by helicopter, and on foot. Metlow rejected all offers of payment (including one for $55,000) as unsuitable, and the Bigfoot hunters gave up after a few days of fruitless searching.
- Born: Adam Brand, Australian country musician; in Perth
- Died: Erich Heckel, 86, German expressionist painter

== January 28, 1970 (Wednesday) ==
- African-American tennis star Arthur Ashe was denied a visa by the white-minority government of South Africa, effectively prohibiting him from competing in the South African Open tennis championship. At the time, South Africa's white-minority government had laws prohibiting whites and nonwhites from competing together in athletic competition. South African Sports Minister Frank Waring announced the ban and said that Ashe was being banned for "his general antagonism toward South Africa."
- All 36 passengers on a bus in Iran died when their vehicle was buried in a snow avalanche on the highway between Arnoz to Mahruzeh in the Elburz Mountains. The group had frozen to death in subzero temperatures. Another 23 people were killed when their vehicles were either buried or swept off the highway.
- Oldrich Cernik resigned from his post as Prime Minister of Czechoslovakia and was succeeded by Lubomir Strougal. Cernik had been appointed as prime minister by Alexander Dubcek during the Prague Spring of 1968, and had been allowed to remain after the Warsaw Pact invasion of the Eastern European nation.
- Died: Rear Admiral Thomas J. Ryan (retired), 68, U.S. Naval officer and Medal of Honor recipient

== January 29, 1970 (Thursday) ==
Division line between Chandigarh, Punjab and Panchkula, Haryana

- Prime Minister Indira Gandhi of India settled a four-year-long religious and political dispute over whether the city of Chandigarh should be considered part of the Sikh-majority state of Punjab, or the neighboring Hindu-majority state of Haryana. Since 1966, both Indian states had claimed Chandigarh as their capital. Gandhi declared that Chandigarh would become a permanent part of Punjab state, and that the state of Haryana would be granted 100 million rupees ($13.3 million in American dollars) to build a new city (which would be developed as the city of Panchkula).
- Born:
  - Paul Ryan, U.S. Congressman who served as Speaker of the House from 2015 to 2019; in Janesville, Wisconsin
  - Heather Graham, American film and television actress; in Milwaukee, Wisconsin
- Died:
  - B. H. Liddell Hart, 74, British military historian
  - Lawren Harris, 84, Canadian painter
  - Thelma Furness, 65, American socialite and actress known for being the mistress of Edward, Prince of Wales, before the prince met Wallis Warfield-Simpson

== January 30, 1970 (Friday) ==
- Three days after his political party lost its majority in parliamentary election, the prime minister of the southern African kingdom of Lesotho, Leabua Jonathan, was scheduled to submit his resignation to King Moshoeshoe II. Chief Leabua called a meeting of his cabinet of ministers, and announced his intention to turn over power to Ntsu Mokhehle. The ministers and four members of the nation's police forces urged Leabua to void the election results and take power by force, and he declared a state of emergency, suspended the national constitution, and began one-man rule. Jonathan allowed the King to continue as Lesotho's head of state, but only with nominal power. After three and a half years of one-man rule and the deaths of 250 people during uprisings, Jonathan would finally end the state of emergency on July 24, 1973.
- The People's Republic of China made its first successful test of an intercontinental ballistic missile (ICBM). The DF-4 (Dong Feng or "east wind") had a range of 4,500 kilometres (2,800 mi) and was China's first two-stage missile and could carry a one megaton nuclear warhead.
- The offices for the U.S. Air Force's investigation of sightings of UFOs, located at the Wright-Patterson Air Force Base, closed permanently at the end of the day. Investigations had ceased six weeks earlier, when the project had been ordered terminated.

== January 31, 1970 (Saturday) ==
- The north African nations of Algeria and Mali jointly announced that they would demarcate their common border.
- Born: Minnie Driver, English-born American film and television actress known for Speechless; in Marylebone
- Died: Slim Harpo (James Isaac Moore), 46, American blues musician; from a heart attack
