= National Defense Authorization Act for Fiscal Year 2014 =

2014 military defense spending bill

- Long title: To authorize and request the President to award the Medal of Honor to Bennie G. Adkins and Donald P. Sloat of the United States Army for acts of valor during the Vietnam Conflict and to authorize the award of the Medal of Honor to certain other veterans who were previously recommended for award of the Medal of Honor.
- Acronyms (colloquial): NDAA 2014
- Announced in: the 113th United States Congress
- Sponsored by: Rep. Theodore E. Deutch (D, FL-21)
- Number of co-sponsors: 78

Codification
- Acts affected: National Defense Authorization Act for Fiscal Year 2002
- U.S.C. sections affected: 10 U.S.C. § 3744, 10 U.S.C. § 3741
- Agencies affected: Executive Office of the President, United States Department of Defense

Legislative history
- Introduced in the House as H.R. 3304 by Rep. Theodore E. Deutch (D, FL-21) on 22 October 2013; Committee consideration by United States House Committee on Armed Services, United States Senate Committee on Armed Services; Passed the House on 28 October 2013 (voice vote); Passed the Senate on 19 November 2013 (Unanimous consent) with amendment; House agreed to Senate amendment on 12 December 2013 (Roll call 641: 350–69) with further amendment; Senate agreed to House amendment on 19 December 2013 (Roll Call Vote 284: 84-15); Signed into law by President Barack Obama on 26 December 2013

H.R. 3304: National Defense Authorization Act for Fiscal Year 2014 Senate vote by state. Both yes One yes, one didn't vote One yes, one no Both no

The National Defense Authorization Act for Fiscal Year 2014 (H.R. 3304; NDAA 2014, Pub.L 113-66) is a United States federal law which specifies the budget and expenditures of the United States Department of Defense (DOD) for Fiscal Year 2014. The law authorizes the DOD to spend $607 billion in Fiscal Year 2014.

The bill passed the U.S. Senate on 19 December 2013, the 53rd consecutive year that a National Defense Authorization Act had been passed.

== Background ==
During the 113th United States Congress, four separate bills each titled the "National Defense Authorization Act for Fiscal Year 2014" were introduced. Those bills were: National Defense Authorization Act for Fiscal Year 2014 (S. 1197; 113th Congress), which received lengthy debate in the Senate; S. 1034, which never made it out of committee; H.R. 1960, which passed the House; and H.R. 3304, which is the bill that became law.

== Summary of the bill ==
The bill authorizes various programs in the United States Army, United States Marine Corps, United States Navy, and the United States Air Force, including requirements for reports and placing future spending caps. The bill also formally revises the Uniform Code of Military Justice to improve its ability to handle both the victims and perpetrators sexual assault, and to decriminalize consensual sodomy.

== Specific provisions of the bill ==
- Pentagon-run anti-narcotics programs
- helping the Jordanian military to secure its border with Syria
- funding for the destruction of chemical weapons in Syria
- Prohibition on new combat or camouflage utility uniforms not adopted by all the services. (Section 352)

== Procedural history ==
The NDAA 2014 was introduced into the United States House of Representatives on 22 October 2013 by Rep. Theodore E. Deutch (D, FL-21). It was referred to the United States House Committee on Armed Services. On 28 October 2013, the House voted to pass the bill by a voice vote. It was received in the United States Senate and referred to the United States Senate Committee on Armed Services on 29 October 2013. The Senate passed the bill on 19 November 2013, with amendments. The House agreed to the Senate amendments and added their own amendments on 12 December 2013. The compromise agreement was structured in a "fast-track process that precludes senators from tacking on controversial amendments dealing with Iran sanctions and other divisive issues." The Senate agreed to those amendments on 19 December 2013 in Roll Call Vote 284 by a vote of 84–15. On 26 December 2013, President Barack Obama signed the bill into law.

== Debate and discussion ==
=== Supporters ===
Senator Carl Levin said that "the bill before us is not a Democratic bill and it is not a Republican bill. It is a bipartisan, bicameral defense bill." He argued that the bill "ensures that important pay and benefits, including combat pay, will continue; includes powerful and important new tools in our fight against military sexual assault; and makes progress toward the day we can close the detention camp at Guantanamo Bay."

=== Criticism ===
The bill was criticized for spending too much money. Director of the Arms & Security Project William Hartung of the Center for International Policy said that "the passage of a National Defense Authorization Act (NDAA) that calls for $30 billion more for the Pentagon and allied agencies than is contained in the recent budget deal passed by both houses of Congress is just the latest indication that defense hawks continue to live in their own world, untroubled by fiscal constraints." President Ryan Alexander of the group Taxpayers for Common Sense opposed over spending in the bill, including a provision of the bill that authorized the DOD to spend money on a weapons system that they did not request money to buy. That provision was $178 million for M-1 Abrams tanks.

Moreover, the NDAA provision (first signed into law in 2012) which permits the military to detain individuals indefinitely without trial, remains in 2014. A lawsuit filed by plaintiffs including journalist Chris Hedges, Noam Chomsky and Daniel Ellsberg against the provision has been aggressively fought at every turn by the government's attorneys. The plaintiffs argue that the NDAA provision constitutes a significant expansion of the laws regarding indefinite detention already established by Authorization for Use of Military Force Against Terrorists (AUMF).

== See also ==
- List of bills in the 113th United States Congress
- National Defense Authorization Act
- Howard P. "Buck" McKeon National Defense Authorization Act for Fiscal Year 2015 (H.R. 4435; 113th Congress) – one of the proposed NDAA bills for fiscal year 2015
