= Bennie G. Adkins =

United States Army Medal of Honor recipient

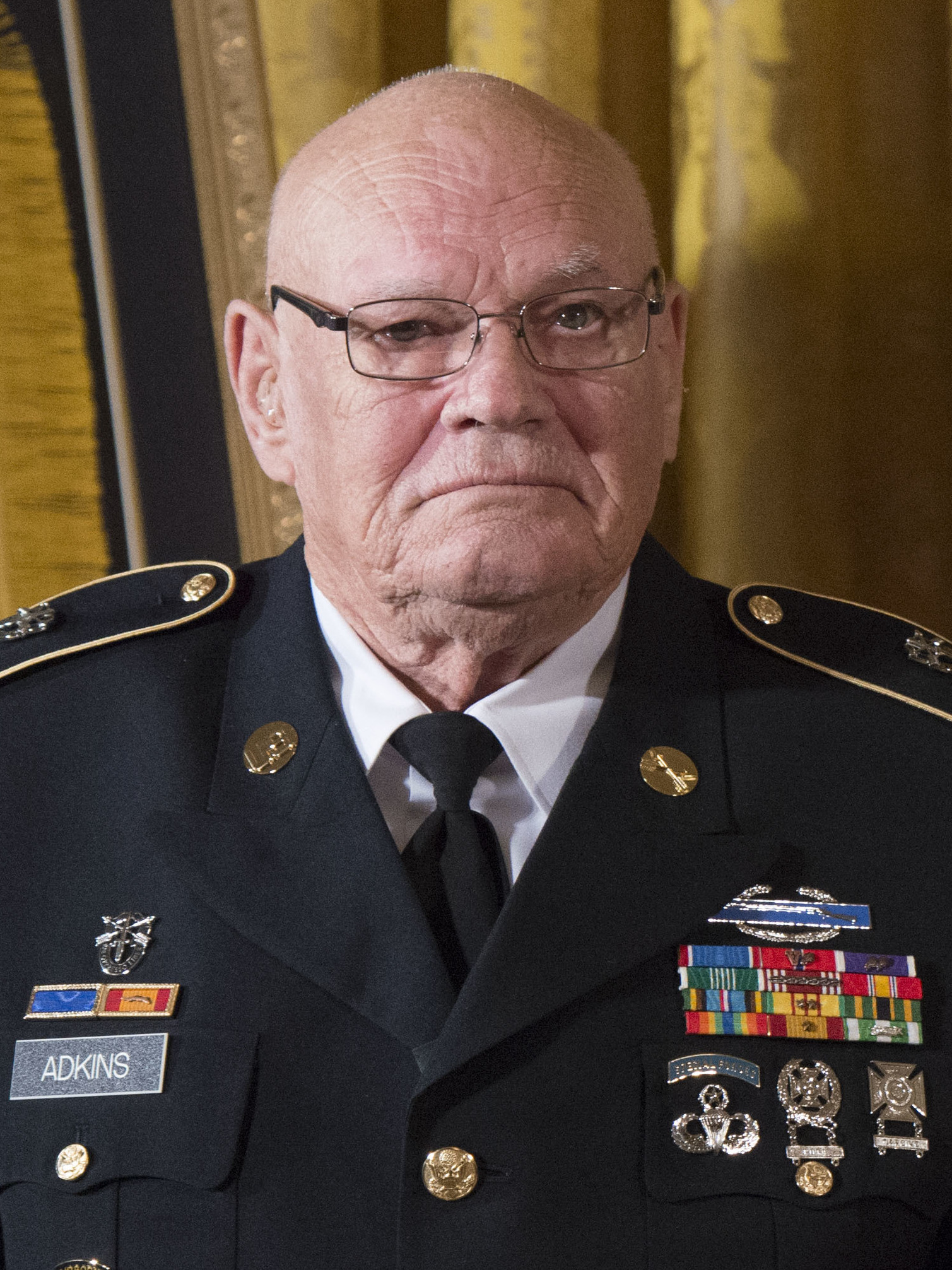
- Adkins during his Medal of Honor ceremony on September 15, 2014.
- Born: February 1, 1934; Waurika, Oklahoma, U.S.
- Died: April 17, 2020 (aged 86); Opelika, Alabama, U.S.
- Burial place: Arlington National Cemetery
- Military career
- Allegiance: United States
- Branch: United States Army
- Service years: 1956–1978
- Rank: Command Sergeant Major
- Unit: 5th Special Forces Group
- Conflicts: Vietnam War: Battle of A Shau
- Awards: Medal of Honor; Bronze Star Medal (2) with "V" device Purple Heart (3)

Bennie Gene Adkins (February 1, 1934 – April 17, 2020) was a United States Army soldier and recipient of the U.S. military's highest decoration, the Medal of Honor, for his actions during the Vietnam War. In March 1966 Adkins distinguished himself during a 38-hour close-combat battle against North Vietnamese Army forces during the Battle of A Shau. At the time of the cited action, Adkins was a sergeant first class serving as an Intelligence Sergeant with Detachment A-102, 5th Special Forces Group, 1st Special Forces.

== Biography ==
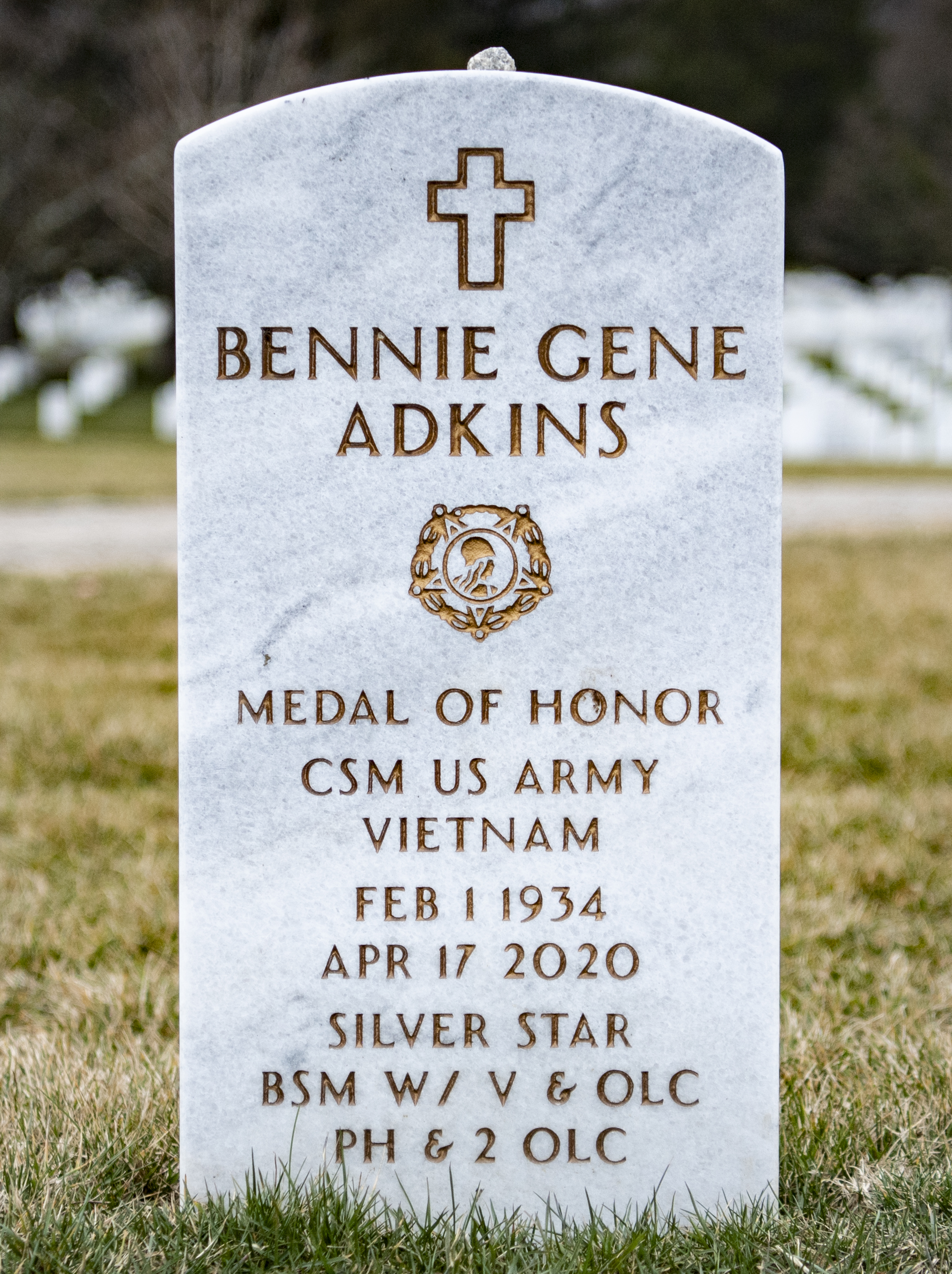
Grave at Arlington National Cemetery

Adkins was born in Waurika, Oklahoma, and was drafted in 1956. He was assigned to a garrison unit in Germany, with a follow-on assignment to the 2nd Infantry Division, Fort Benning, Georgia. After attending Airborne School, he volunteered for Special Forces in 1961, serving with Special Forces for more than 13 years with the 7th, 3rd, 6th and 5th Special Forces Groups (Airborne). During that time he deployed to the Republic of Vietnam three times between 1963 and 1971. In April 1967, Adkins was awarded the Distinguished Service Cross for his actions with Detachment A-102 during his second tour in Vietnam. After Vietnam, Adkins was assigned to Fort Huachuca. Graduating in the third class of the Sergeant Major Academy, he returned to the Special Forces at Fort Bragg, then went to Fort Sherman and led training at its Jungle Operations Training Center. Adkins finally retired from the Army in 1978.

After the Army, Adkins earned a bachelor's and two master's degrees from Troy State University. He operated his own accounting company, and taught classes at Southern Union Junior College and Auburn University. On May 12, 2017, Troy University Chancellor Jack Hawkins Jr. awarded Adkins an honorary doctorate of laws.

In March 2020, Adkins was hospitalized with COVID-19. He was admitted to the intensive care unit and put on a ventilator after experiencing respiratory failure. He died from complications of the virus on April 17, 2020, at the age of 86. Adkins was buried at Arlington National Cemetery on December 16, 2020.

=== Medal of Honor award ===
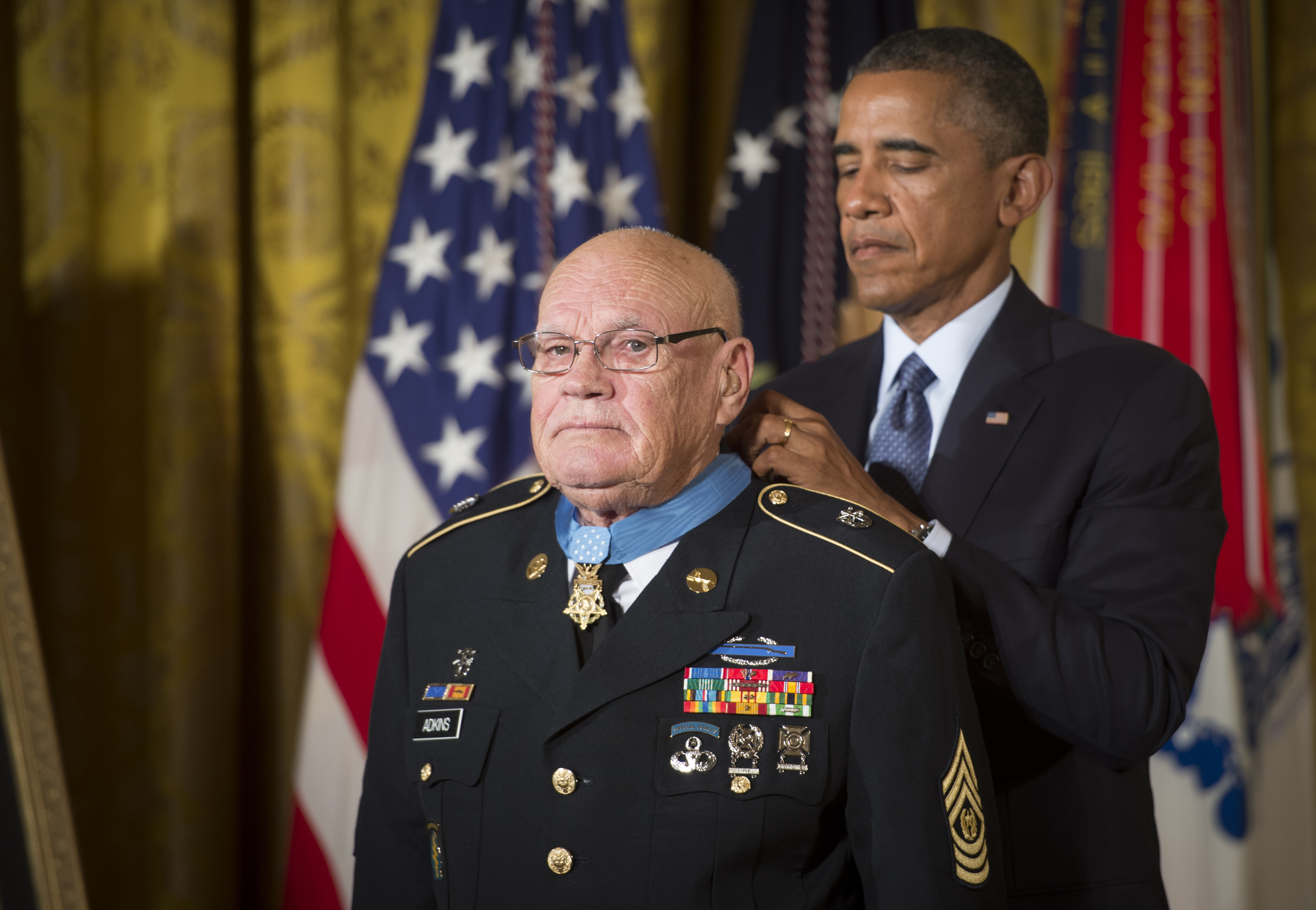
CSM Adkins receiving the Medal of Honor from President Barack Obama.

From 2002, the U.S. Army reviewed all 6,500 recipients of the Distinguished Service Cross to see if any recipients had actually performed actions worthy of the Medal of Honor; this led to two dozen medal upgrades in March 2014. In 2013, as part of the National Defense Authorization Act for Fiscal Year 2014, the Senate Armed Service Committee passed a provision removing the time limit for Donald P. Sloat and Adkins. On September 15, 2014, President Obama awarded the Medal of Honor to Adkins as an upgrade of his 1967 Distinguished Service Cross. During that ceremony, the Medal of Honor was awarded posthumously to Sloat and American Civil War army officer Alonzo Cushing. Adkins was also inducted into the Pentagon's Hall of Heroes.

== Medal of Honor Citation ==

The President of the United States of America, authorized by Act of Congress, March 3, 1863, has awarded in the name of Congress the Medal of Honor to

SERGEANT FIRST CLASS
BENNIE G. ADKINS
UNITED STATES ARMY

For conspicuous gallantry and intrepidity at the risk of his life above and beyond the call of duty:

== Awards and Decorations ==
Adkins received the following awards:

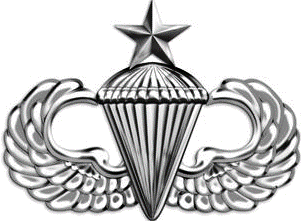

Badge	Combat Infantryman Badge		
1st row	Medal of Honor		
2nd row	Bronze Star Medal with "V" Device and 1 Oak leaf cluster	Purple Heart	Army Commendation Medal
3rd row	Army Good Conduct Medal with 5 Good Conduct Loops	National Defense Service Medal	Armed Forces Expeditionary Medal
4th row	Vietnam Service Medal with 6 Campaign stars	Republic of Vietnam Gallantry Cross with Bronze Star	Vietnam Campaign Medal
Badge	Senior Parachutist Badge with 1 Combat Jump Star		
Tab	Special Forces Tab		
Unit Awards	Presidential Unit Citation		
Unit Awards	Meritorious Unit Commendation	RVN Gallantry Cross Unit Citation with Palm	RVN Civil Actions Unit Citation 1st class

Special Forces Patch

== See also ==
- List of Medal of Honor recipients for the Vietnam War
