= Prairie Meteorite Network =

Astronomical observatory in the US

- Formation: 1964
- Dissolved: 1975
- Type: Camera network
- Legal status: Defunct
- Purpose: Record meteorite falls
- Region served: Midwestern United States
- Parent organization: Smithsonian Astrophysical Observatory

The Prairie Meteorite Network was a system of sixteen camera stations in Midwestern United States, run by the Smithsonian Astrophysical Observatory from 1964 to 1975. The network used surplus aerocameras with 6.3–12 inch focal length wide angle metrogon lenses that covered a format of 9 x 18 inches on aero roll film. During ten years of network activity only one meteorite fall was recorded, the Lost City meteorite in 1970.

== See also ==
- Glossary of meteoritics
- European Fireball Network
