= Donald Sloat =

Medal of Honor recipient (1949–1970)

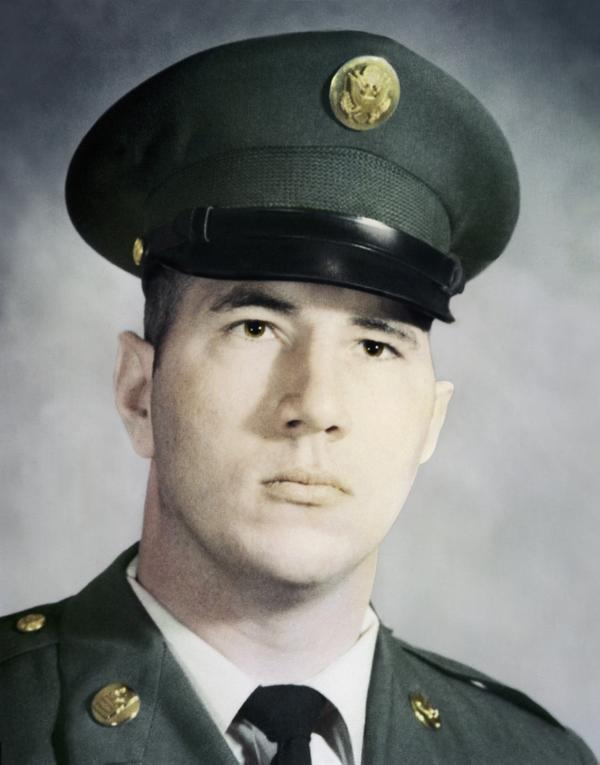
- Born: February 6, 1949; Coweta, Oklahoma, U.S.
- Died: January 17, 1970 (aged 20); Que Son Valley, Quang Nam Province, South Vietnam
- Burial place: Vernon Cemetery, Coweta, Oklahoma
- Military career
- Allegiance: United States of America
- Branch: United States Army
- Service years: 1969–1970
- Rank: Specialist
- Units: 3rd Platoon, Delta Company, 2nd Battalion, 1st Infantry Regiment, 196th Light Infantry Brigade, Americal Division
- Wars: Vietnam War †
- Awards: Medal of Honor; Bronze Star Medal; Purple Heart

Donald Paul Sloat (February 6, 1949 – January 17, 1970) was a United States Army soldier and a posthumous recipient of the Medal of Honor, the military's highest decoration for his actions in the Vietnam War.

== Early life ==
Donald Sloat was born to Ezra Paul Sloat and his wife, Beatrice Evelyn Turnbow, in Coweta, Oklahoma, where he lived most of his life. He graduated from Coweta High School in 1967. He then attended Northeastern Oklahoma A&M College in Miami, Oklahoma.

== Military career ==
He enlisted in the U.S. Army on March 19, 1969. After finishing basic training at Fort Polk, Louisiana, he shipped out to South Vietnam in September, 1969. By then, he was a machine gunner in the 3rd Platoon, Company D, 2nd Battalion, 1st Infantry Regiment, 196th Light Infantry Brigade, 23rd Infantry Division (Americal Division).

== Awards and decorations ==
Sloat earned the following awards and decorations:

Combat Infantry Badge
Medal of Honor	Bronze Star Medal w/ V device	Purple Heart
Army Commendation Medal w/ V device	Army Good Conduct Medal	National Defense Service Medal
Vietnam Service Medal w/2 campaign stars	Republic of Vietnam Gallantry Cross with Palm Device	Vietnam Campaign Medal

From 2002, the U.S. Army reviewed all 6,500 recipients of the Distinguished Service Cross to see if any recipients had been short-changed; this led to two dozen medal upgrades in March 2014. In 2013, as part of the National Defense Authorization Act for Fiscal Year 2014, the Senate Armed Service Committee passed a provision removing the time limit for Donald P. Sloat and Bennie G. Adkins. On September 15, 2014, President Obama awarded the Medal of Honor to Adkins as an upgrade of his 1967 Distinguished Service Cross. During that ceremony, the Medal of Honor was awarded posthumously to Sloat and American Civil War army officer Alonzo Cushing. President Barack Obama presented the medal to Donald's brother, Bill Sloat (now deceased), in a ceremony at the East Room of the White House.

== Medal of Honor citation ==
Rank and organization: Specialist Four, United States Army, 3rd Platoon, Delta Company, 2nd Battalion, 1st Infantry Regiment, 196th Light Infantry Brigade, Americal Division.

Place and date: Que Son Valley, Quảng Nam Province, Republic of Vietnam, January 17, 1970

Entered service at: Coweta, Oklahoma

Citation

Specialist Four Donald P. Sloat distinguished himself by acts of gallantry and intrepidity at the risk of his life above and beyond the call of duty while serving as a Machinegunner with Company D, 2d Battalion, 1st Infantry Regiment, 196th Light Infantry Brigade, Americal Division, during combat operations against an armed enemy in the Republic of Vietnam on January 17, 1970. On that morning, Specialist Four Sloat's squad was conducting a patrol, serving as a blocking element in support of tanks and armored personnel carriers in the area. As the squad moved up a small hill in file formation, the lead soldier tripped a wire attached to a hand grenade booby-trap set up by enemy forces. As the grenade rolled down the hill, Specialist Four Sloat knelt and picked up the grenade. After initially attempting to throw the grenade, Specialist Four Sloat realized that detonation was imminent. He then drew the grenade to his body and shielded his squad members from the blast, saving their lives. Specialist Four Sloat's actions define the ultimate sacrifice of laying down his own life in order to save the lives of his comrades. Specialist Four Donald P. Sloat's extraordinary heroism and selflessness above and beyond the call of duty are in keeping with the highest traditions of military service and reflect great credit upon himself, Company D, 2d Battalion, 1st Infantry Regiment, 196th Light Infantry Brigade, Americal Division and the United States Army.

== Decorations donated to Coweta ==
February 6, 2017, was declared as Specialist Donald P. Sloat Medal of Honor Day in Coweta. The remainder of Sloat's family had decided to donate the Medal of Honor, along with many other military decorations, to Robert Morton, mayor of the city of Coweta, for display. The medals will be permanently displayed at Coweta City Hall.
