= Lost City, Oklahoma =

Unincorporated community in Oklahoma, US

Lost City is an unincorporated community and census-designated place (CDP) in Cherokee County, Oklahoma, United States. The population was 767 as of the 2020 Census, virtually the same as the population of 770 recorded at the 2010 census. It was the site of the first meteorite fall in the US to be recorded by a camera network.

According to one source, the name came about after a group, possibly Native American, settled in the area, but ended up disappearing from their village.

== Geography ==
Lost City is located north of State Highway 51 and northwest of the city of Tahlequah in northeast Oklahoma. The city is part of "Green Country", a region of the state characterized by green vegetation and numerous lakes, including Fort Gibson Lake, which lies west of Lost City.

Lost City's geographic coordinates are 36°00′58″N 95°08′58″W. According to the United States Census Bureau, the CDP has a total area of 23.5 square miles (60.9 km^{2}), all land.

== Demographics ==
=== 2020 census ===
As of the 2020 census, Lost City had a population of 767. The median age was 44.8 years. 22.9% of residents were under the age of 18 and 21.4% of residents were 65 years of age or older. For every 100 females there were 96.2 males, and for every 100 females age 18 and over there were 94.4 males age 18 and over.

0.0% of residents lived in urban areas, while 100.0% lived in rural areas.

There were 303 households in Lost City, of which 29.0% had children under the age of 18 living in them. Of all households, 60.4% were married-couple households, 14.5% were households with a male householder and no spouse or partner present, and 24.1% were households with a female householder and no spouse or partner present. About 27.7% of all households were made up of individuals and 15.5% had someone living alone who was 65 years of age or older.

There were 335 housing units, of which 9.6% were vacant. The homeowner vacancy rate was 0.0% and the rental vacancy rate was 2.6%.

Racial composition as of the 2020 census
Race	Number	Percent
White	333	43.4%
Black or African American	1	0.1%
American Indian and Alaska Native	323	42.1%
Asian	0	0.0%
Native Hawaiian and Other Pacific Islander	0	0.0%
Some other race	12	1.6%
Two or more races	98	12.8%
Hispanic or Latino (of any race)	17	2.2%

=== 2000 census ===
As of the census of 2000, there were 809 people, 279 households, and 234 families residing in the CDP. The population density was 34.7 inhabitants per square mile (13.4/km^{2}). There were 308 housing units at an average density of 13.2/sq mi (5.1/km^{2}). The racial makeup of the CDP was 55.13% White, 38.07% Native American, 0.49% Asian, 1.11% from other races, and 5.19% from two or more races. Hispanic or Latino of any race were 1.11% of the population.

There were 279 households, out of which 41.2% had children under the age of 18 living with them, 67.4% were married couples living together, 11.5% had a female householder with no husband present, and 16.1% were non-families. 13.6% of all households were made up of individuals, and 5.4% had someone living alone who was 65 years of age or older. The average household size was 2.90 and the average family size was 3.17.

In the CDP, the population was spread out, with 30.4% under the age of 18, 7.9% from 18 to 24, 27.1% from 25 to 44, 25.6% from 45 to 64, and 9.0% who were 65 years of age or older. The median age was 35 years. For every 100 females, there were 102.8 males. For every 100 females age 18 and over, there were 97.5 males.

The median income for a household in the CDP was $29,118, and the median income for a family was $31,932. Males had a median income of $27,566 versus $20,357 for females. The per capita income for the CDP was $11,629. About 16.7% of families and 15.4% of the population were below the poverty line, including 11.7% of those under age 18 and 25.6% of those age 65 or over.

== Meteorite fall of 3 January 1970 ==
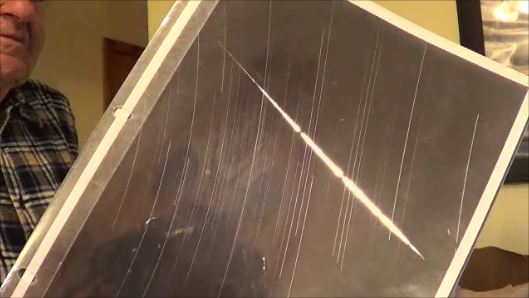
This Lost City Meteorite photograph was taken by one of the (now-defunct) Prairie Meteorite Network cameras. Standing behind and off to the left of the photograph is the farmer who accidentally found two fragments of this meteorite. For playing such a pivotal role in the Lost City Meteorite Fall, the Smithsonian Astrophysical Observatory awarded him with this copy of the original photograph.

On January 3, 1970, four stations (Hominy OK, Woodward OK, Pleasanton KS, and Garden City KS) of the Prairie Meteorite Network simultaneously photographed the track of a meteoroid fireball. (The fireball was visible for approximately nine seconds. It was accompanied with a sonic boom.) Analysis of the photographs indicated that a meteorite might have landed within an area east of Lost City. This was the first time in the US that simultaneous photography of a fireball from multiple observation points was achieved, making it possible to calculate a trajectory and delimit a search area on the ground.

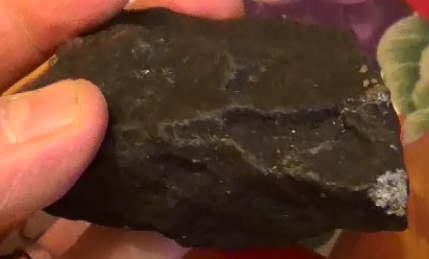
This 272-g fragment was discovered on January 17, 1970. A cattle farmer found it while walking through his cow pasture.

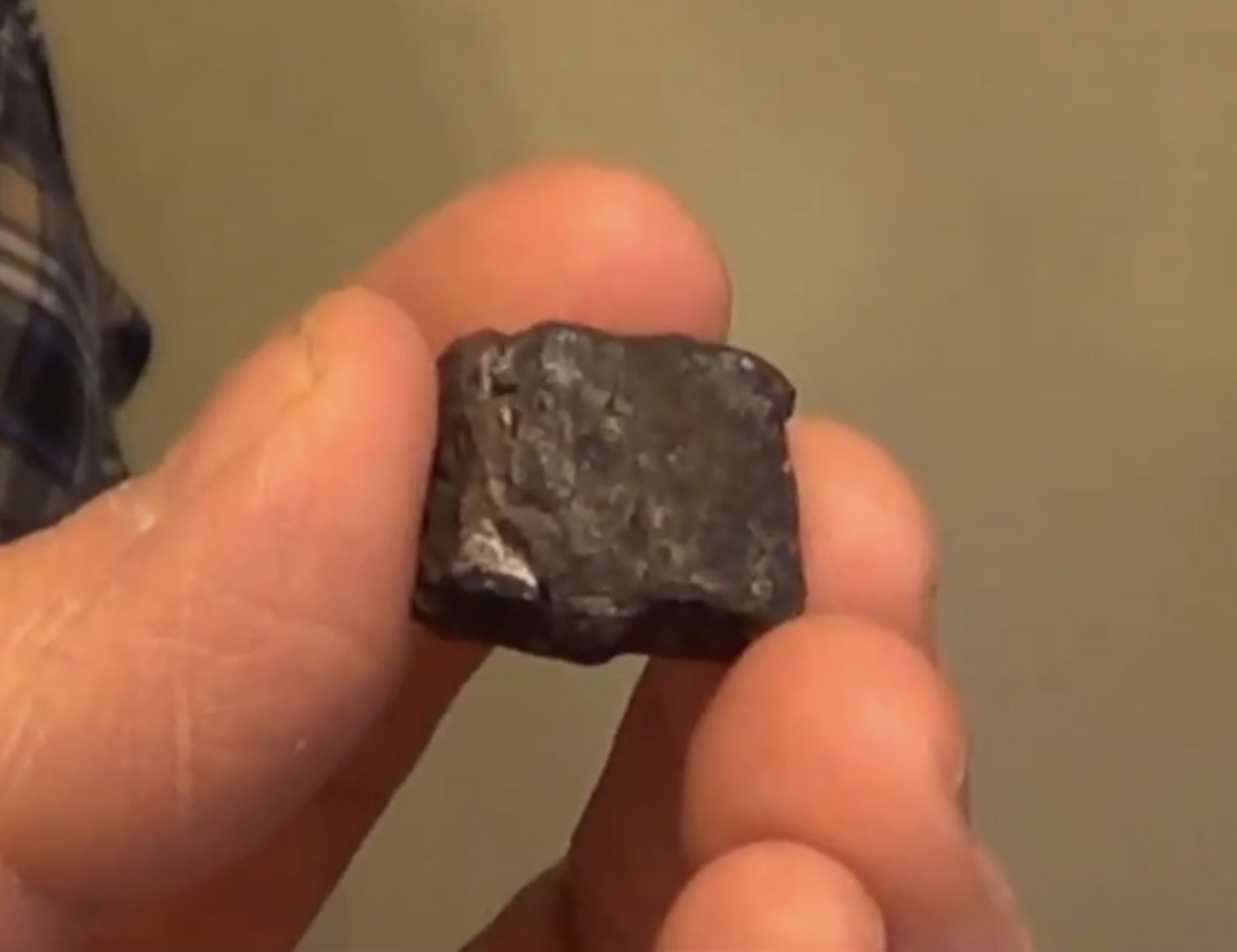
The farmer who found the 272-g fragment also found this much smaller fragment on the roof of his house.

Six days later Gunther Schwartz, a field manager for the network, went to the Lost City school to ask questions to see if anyone had seen or heard anything about it, at that time a maintenance man and bus driver by the name of Isaac Gifford told the scientist he had seen it while he was raccoon hunting. Gifford took Schwartz to the spot where he had seen the meteorite in the air close to where he was hunting, they walked to the location and soon discovered the meteorite. "Suddenly there was the black rock in the road, and I wondered what it was doing there, and got out to look at it," Schwartz said. "And then you get hysterical. Just think of the odds against finding it there. Fantastic."

Three additional smaller meteorite fragments were recovered later: on January 17, a fragment weighing 272 grams; on February 2, one weighing 6.6 kilograms; and on May 4, one weighing 640 grams within one-half mile of Lost City. The Lost City meteorite proved to be an H5 chondrite.

The photos that were taken by the Smithsonian Astrophysical Observatory enabled scientists to reconstruct the meteorites orbit...concluding that it originated somewhere in the asteroid belt.

== Bibliography ==
- The Daily Oklahoman, January 14, 1970. Oklahoma City: Oklahoma Publishing Company.
- Lost City. The Meteoritical Society, 27 Nov 2006. (accessed February 3, 2007)
