= Medanitos =

Medanitos may refer to:

- Medanitos (Santa María), a village in Catamarca Province, Argentina
- Medanitos (Tinogasta), a village in Catamarca Province, Argentina
