= Medanitos, Tinogasta =

Coordinates: 27°32′S 67°36′W

Medanitos (Tinogasta)
- Municipality and village
- Interactive map of Medanitos (Tinogasta)
- Country: Argentina
- Province: Catamarca Province
- Time zone: UTC−3 (ART)

Medanitos (Tinogasta) is a village and municipality in Catamarca Province in northwestern Argentina.
