= Medanitos, Santa María =

Coordinates: 26.7450°S 66.0789°W

Medanitos (Santa María)
- Municipality and village
- Interactive map of Medanitos (Santa María)
- Country: Argentina
- Province: Catamarca Province
- Time zone: UTC−3 (ART)

Medanitos (Santa María) is a village and municipality in Catamarca Province in northwestern Argentina.
