= List of named minor planets: R =

This is a partial list of named minor planets, containing all those starting with the letter R, as of 9 November 2026. It is ordered in a case-insensitive, alphabetical manner and contains a total of 1,209 entries. Grey minor planets have no article and redirect to the list of minor planets instead (see List of minor planets § Main index).

== R ==
- 2100 Ra-Shalom
- 3184 Raab
- 1786 Raahe
- 1624 Rabe
- 11189 Rabeaton
- 5666 Rabelais
- 5040 Rabinowitz
- 137217 Racah
- 12987 Racalmuto
- 21742 Rachaelscott
- 18698 Racharles
- 34158 Rachelchang
- 17698 Racheldavis
- 28591 Racheldilger
- 34415 Racheldragos
- 674 Rachele
- 29975 Racheledelstein
- 97677 Rachelfreed
- 333579 Rachelfunk
- 16223 Racheljoseph
- 19568 Rachelmarie
- 32280 Rachelmashal
- 25191 Rachelouise
- 29788 Rachelrossi
- 11367 Rachelseevers
- 8995 Rachelstevenson
- 32314 Rachelzhang
- 4345 Rachmaninoff
- 23754 Rachnareddy
- 11051 Racine
- 20268 Racollier
- 12426 Racquetball
- 135799 Ráczmiklós
- 13748 Radaly
- 15299 Rådbo
- 1420 Radcliffe
- 149884 Radebeul
- 2581 Radegast
- 2375 Radek
- 30280 Raderlane
- 206265 Radian
- 399442 Radicofani
- 11144 Radiocommunicata
- 2833 Radishchev
- 33401 Radiya-Dixit
- 17881 Radmall
- 155217 Radnóti
- 159011 Radomyshl
- 4485 Radonezhskij
- 32065 Radulovacki
- 400072 Radviliškis
- 25955 Radway
- 29776 Radzhabov
- 3923 Radzievskij
- 240021 Radzo
- 9797 Raes
- 128036 Rafaelnadal
- 20603 Rafaelribeiro
- 18664 Rafaelta
- 576853 Rafalreszelewski
- 21589 Rafes
- 102224 Raffaellolena
- 9957 Raffaellosanti
- 3648 Raffinetti
- 1644 Rafita
- 31596 Ragavender
- 1839 Ragazza
- 42523 Ragazzileonardo
- 10590 Ragazzoni
- 24149 Raghavan
- 30169 Raghavganesh
- 28254 Raghrama
- 30267 Raghuvanshi
- 23844 Raghvendra
- 28796 Ragozzine
- 31701 Ragula
- 23747 Rahaelgupta
- 12177 Raharto
- 5056 Rahua
- 30037 Rahulmehta
- 31853 Rahulmital
- 34135 Rahulsubra
- 145558 Raiatea
- 4518 Raikin
- 339486 Raimeux
- 1450 Raimonda
- 34730 Rainajain
- 62666 Rainawessen
- 185633 Rainbach
- 221019 Raine
- 16802 Rainer
- 426524 Rainerhannig
- 185639 Rainerkling
- 234761 Rainerkracht
- 6366 Rainerwieler
- 10008 Raisanyo
- 1137 Raïssa
- 30539 Raissamuller
- 25465 Rajagopalan
- 222903 Rajanidhingra
- 18658 Rajdev
- 33581 Rajeevjha
- 25781 Rajendra
- 15613 Rajihyun
- 14654 Rajivgupta
- 12374 Rakhat
- 4108 Rakos
- 432361 Rakovski
- 3332 Raksha
- 111594 Ráktanya
- 5825 Rakuyou
- 400309 Ralfhofner
- 8338 Ralhan
- 5051 Ralph
- 4517 Ralpharvey
- 9850 Ralphcopeland
- 33594 Ralphlawton
- 172191 Ralphmcnutt
- 50427 Ralphmerrifield
- 9003 Ralphmilliken
- 7732 Ralphpass
- 12956 Ralphwijers
- 30230 Ralucarufu
- 406006 Ralys
- 20851 Ramachandran
- 71615 Ramakers
- 25468 Ramakrishna
- 55753 Raman
- 41458 Ramanjooloo
- 20837 Ramanlal
- 4130 Ramanujan
- 24152 Ramasesh
- 23850 Ramaswami
- 32066 Ramayya
- 17886 Ramazan
- 447682 Rambaldi
- 9683 Rambaldo
- 20605 Rambaux
- 21722 Rambhia
- 9083 Ramboehm
- 18028 Ramchandani
- 4734 Rameau
- 24376 Ramesh
- 3926 Ramirez
- 457818 Ramírezmoreta
- 18170 Ramjeawan
- 110393 Rammstein
- 29691 Ramónallerulloa
- 20693 Ramondiaz
- 342017 Ramonin
- 37583 Ramonkhanna
- 117413 Ramonycajal
- 89739 Rampazzi
- 10321 Rampo
- 137632 Ramsauer
- 8001 Ramsden
- 4416 Ramses
- 23612 Ramzel
- 4248 Ranald
- 3928 Randa
- 25032 Randallray
- 283990 Randallrosenfeld
- 13243 Randhahn
- 3163 Randi
- 31664 Randiiwessen
- 17224 Randoross
- 522563 Randyflynn
- 72633 Randygroth
- 26964 Randykamiya
- 232553 Randypeterson
- 14114 Randyray
- 9308 Randyrose
- 44473 Randytatum
- 29886 Randytung
- 349386 Randywright
- 6821 Ranevskaya
- 11605 Ranfagni
- 32067 Ranganathan
- 27071 Rangwala
- 333565 Rani
- 22543 Ranjan
- 20012 Ranke
- 541691 Ranschburg
- 25469 Ransohoff
- 6440 Ransome
- 1530 Rantaseppä
- 18874 Raoulbehrend
- 90837 Raoulvalentini
- 140620 Raoulwallenberg
- 505906 Raozihe
- 221465 Rapa Nui
- 708 Raphaela
- 49265 Raphaeljimenez
- 33937 Raphaelmarschall
- 595590 Raphaelroose
- 131765 Raphaelschneider
- 34467 Raphotter
- 16180 Rapoport
- 33221 Raqueljacobson
- 12522 Rara
- 1148 Rarahu
- 11400 Raša
- 4113 Rascana
- 90397 Rasch
- 48588 Raschröder
- 253412 Ráskaylea
- 25062 Rasmussen
- 543198 Rastislavmráz
- 24697 Rastrelli
- 21724 Ratai
- 333599 Rathan
- 18115 Rathbun
- 19121 Rathnasree
- 15753 Rathsman
- 927 Ratisbona
- 5774 Ratliff
- 25555 Ratnavarma
- 28633 Ratripathi
- 159409 Ratte
- 8661 Ratzinger
- 290129 Rátzlászló
- 38640 Rau
- 5266 Rauch
- 10025 Rauer
- 40081 Rault
- 1882 Rauma
- 20291 Raumurthy
- 9165 Raup
- 113415 Rauracia
- 29674 Raušal
- 4237 Raushenbakh
- 5603 Rausudake
- 4977 Rauthgundis
- 4727 Ravel
- 251619 Ravenna
- 32295 Ravichandran
- 32131 Ravindran
- 22810 Rawat
- 16561 Rawls
- 2854 Rawson
- 147736 Raxavinic
- 8983 Rayakazakova
- 3985 Raybatson
- 5840 Raybrown
- 732821 Raycarlberg
- 333539 Rayfranco
- 31962 Rayharvey
- 18191 Rayhe
- 4668 Rayjay
- 31858 Raykanipe
- 10077 Raykoenig
- 22740 Rayleigh
- 10050 Rayman
- 197189 Raymond
- 15945 Raymondavid
- 29686 Raymondmaung
- 31902 Raymondwang
- 18836 Raymundto
- 11039 Raynal
- 192001 Raynatedford
- 10037 Raypickard
- 27368 Raytesar
- 90528 Raywhite
- 3790 Raywilson
- 32103 Reʼemsari
- 20474 Reasoner
- 7098 Réaumur
- 3007 Reaves
- 28710 Rebeccab
- 20354 Rebeccachan
- 28504 Rebeccafaye
- 134050 Rebeccaghent
- 12120 Rebeccagrella
- 25322 Rebeccajean
- 23008 Rebeccajohns
- 178226 Rebeccalouise
- 153289 Rebeccawatson
- 22987 Rebeckaufman
- 26711 Rebekahbau
- 572 Rebekka
- 10932 Rebentrost
- 34451 Rebohearn
- 333636 Reboul
- 33504 Rebrouwer
- 25912 Recawkwell
- 573 Recha
- 3365 Recogne
- 30718 Records
- 2884 Reddish
- 517104 Redinger
- 7886 Redman
- 17518 Redqueen
- 38070 Redwine
- 127935 Reedmckenna
- 432107 Reedspurling
- 118554 Reedtimmer
- 4587 Rees
- 30325 Reesabpathak
- 6475 Refugium
- 121481 Reganhoward
- 33825 Reganwill
- 20152 Regberg
- 4347 Reger
- 3778 Regge
- 274246 Reggiacaserta
- 33994 Regidufour
- 285 Regina
- 84096 Reginaldglenice
- 22877 Reginamiller
- 28687 Reginareals
- 37607 Regineolsen
- 574 Reginhild
- 1117 Reginita
- 9307 Regiomontanus
- 351785 Reguly
- 145475 Rehoboth
- 29185 Reich
- 9863 Reichardt
- 20582 Reichenbach
- 8684 Reichwein
- 3422 Reid
- 6314 Reigber
- 12529 Reighard
- 6565 Reiji
- 5239 Reiki
- 65775 Reikotosa
- 14401 Reikoyukawa
- 10320 Reiland
- 6163 Reimers
- 12280 Reims
- 39703 Reina
- 12640 Reinbertdeleeuw
- 7661 Reincken
- 563285 Reinerschwarz
- 7689 Reinerstoss
- 144496 Reingard
- 16705 Reinhardt
- 18092 Reinhold
- 7148 Reinholdbien
- 1111 Reinmuthia
- 4593 Reipurth
- 1577 Reiss
- 30851 Reißfelder
- 550034 Reitsam
- 13327 Reitsema
- 271009 Reitterferenc
- 58164 Reiwanohoshi
- 3871 Reiz
- 6299 Reizoutoyoko
- 33405 Rekhtman
- 40459 Rektorys
- 3739 Rem
- 27985 Remanzacco
- 10119 Remarque
- 8395 Rembaut
- 4511 Rembrandt
- 2552 Remek
- 58672 Remigio
- 34769 Remilabeille
- 5695 Remillieux
- 9137 Remo
- 29443 Remocorti
- 15563 Remsberg
- 14683 Remy
- 21674 Renaldowebb
- 575 Renate
- 1416 Renauxa
- 16781 Renčín
- 120942 Rendafuzhong
- 382900 Rendelmann
- 20518 Rendtel
- 241364 Reneangelil
- 12107 Reneebarcia
- 30152 Reneefallon
- 31249 Renéefleming
- 25798 Reneeschaaf
- 10285 Renémichelsen
- 45580 Renéracine
- 25544 Renerogers
- 15507 Rengarajan
- 1792 Reni
- 78534 Renmir
- 20614 Renner
- 6190 Rennes
- 5509 Rennsteig
- 6677 Renoir
- 8877 Rentaro
- 227218 Rényi
- 6291 Renzetti
- 1204 Renzia
- 216241 Renzopiano
- 4930 Rephiltim
- 2468 Repin
- 906 Repsolda
- 11111 Repunit
- 2254 Requiem
- 578164 Rerrichbéla
- 1081 Reseda
- 7046 Reshetnev
- 1371 Resi
- 3356 Resnik
- 16930 Respighi
- 54362 Restitutum
- 233653 Rether
- 17190 Retopezzoli
- 2303 Retsina
- 8474 Rettig
- 1096 Reunerta
- 544309 Reuss
- 8666 Reuter
- 32072 Revanur
- 13358 Revelle
- 75844 Rexadams
- 134099 Rexengelhardt
- 48888 REXIS
- 13647 Rey
- 14684 Reyes
- 594032 Reyhersamuel
- 59830 Reynek
- 12945 Reynierpeletier
- 12776 Reynolds
- 21605 Reynoso
- 528 Rezia
- 21726 Rezvanian
- 38083 Rhadamanthus
- 15949 Rhaeticus
- 9316 Rhamnus
- 577 Rhea
- 28732 Rheakamat
- 34796 Rheamalhotra
- 6070 Rheinland
- 9807 Rhene
- 9142 Rhesus
- 5366 Rhianjones
- 16912 Rhiannon
- 10279 Rhiannonblaauw
- 27529 Rhiannonmayne
- 5907 Rhigmus
- 21727 Rhines
- 188847 Rhipeus
- 346889 Rhiphonos
- 6529 Rhoads
- 907 Rhoda
- 330712 Rhodescolossus
- 1197 Rhodesia
- 437 Rhodia
- 166 Rhodope
- 5258 Rhoeo
- 5689 Rhön
- 31728 Rhondah
- 8468 Rhondastroud
- 11875 Rhône
- 4934 Rhôneranger
- 16087 Rhythmgarg
- 34302 Riagalanos
- 28868 Rianchandra
- 879 Ricarda
- 158520 Ricardoferreira
- 12407 Riccardi
- 37735 Riccardomuti
- 86029 Riccardopozzobon
- 14074 Riccati
- 13642 Ricci
- 122632 Riccioli
- 18462 Riccò
- 1230 Riceia
- 3972 Richard
- 671271 Richardadsouza
- 20177 Richardallen
- 27622 Richardbaker
- 7966 Richardbaum
- 15579 Richardbeattie
- 120218 Richardberry
- 302849 Richardboyle
- 16066 Richardbressler
- 30289 Richardcarlson
- 10217 Richardcook
- 22837 Richardcruz
- 16829 Richardfrench
- 70004 Richardgalli
- 559135 Richardgreaves
- 171195 Richardgreen
- 20617 Richardgreenwood
- 209206 Richardhenry
- 667713 Richardholman
- 50310 Richardjakiel
- 423097 Richardjarrell
- 15573 Richardjoseph
- 117596 Richardkuhns
- 15599 Richardlarson
- 21552 Richardlee
- 11002 Richardlis
- 6368 Richardmenendez
- 50401 Richardmeyers
- 241373 Richardmoissl
- 27063 Richardmontano
- 37139 Richardmuller
- 163800 Richardnorton
- 29898 Richardnugent
- 22002 Richardregan
- 20857 Richardromeo
- 31778 Richardschnur
- 21680 Richardschwartz
- 12530 Richardson
- 10708 Richardspalding
- 11455 Richardstarr
- 16703 Richardstrauss
- 25811 Richardteo
- 242830 Richardwessling
- 20306 Richarnold
- 120350 Richburns
- 4129 Richelen
- 755002 Richer
- 128607 Richhund
- 868349 Richie
- 1214 Richilde
- 22839 Richlawrence
- 16264 Richlee
- 12200 Richlipe
- 12395 Richnelson
- 22156 Richoffman
- 11187 Richoliver
- 189948 Richswanson
- 3338 Richter
- 20583 Richthammer
- 8717 Richviktorov
- 129149 Richwitherspoon
- 8358 Rickblakley
- 22812 Ricker
- 9983 Rickfienberg
- 207394 Rickfitzgerald
- 22835 Rickgardner
- 51823 Rickhusband
- 13744 Rickline
- 3692 Rickman
- 22448 Ricksaunders
- 23854 Rickschaffer
- 183357 Rickshelton
- 174361 Rickwhite
- 22936 Ricmccutchen
- 114828 Ricoromita
- 1514 Ricouxa
- 4763 Ride
- 20626 Rider-Stokes
- 4025 Ridley
- 16189 Riehl
- 58627 Rieko
- 1025 Riema
- 4167 Riemann
- 6145 Riemenschneider
- 24600 Riepe
- 4327 Ries
- 66480 Riese
- 604827 Rietavas
- 179678 Rietmeijer
- 20016 Rietschel
- 85512 Rieugnie
- 1796 Riga
- 19911 Rigaux
- 17610 Riggsbee
- 16766 Righi
- 9427 Righini
- 12811 Rigonistern
- 6420 Riheijyaya
- 25616 Riinuots
- 11706 Rijeka
- 15415 Rika
- 29802 Rikhavshah
- 118945 Rikhill
- 16262 Rikurtz
- 22745 Rikuzentakata
- 18449 Rikwouters
- 26399 Rileyennis
- 117569 Rileyharris
- 9833 Rilke
- 20495 Rimavská Sobota
- 4635 Rimbaud
- 1883 Rimito
- 4534 Rimskij-Korsakov
- 6705 Rinaketty
- 152647 Rinako
- 67070 Rinaldi
- 118178 Rinckart
- 12165 Ringleb
- 5793 Ringuelet
- 118102 Rinjani
- 23999 Rinner
- 12915 Rinoliver
- 11334 Rio de Janeiro
- 209083 Rioja
- 16669 Rionuevo
- 21932 Rios
- 7711 Říp
- 8599 Riparia
- 107223 Ripero
- 228133 Ripoll
- 247542 Ripplrónai
- 16357 Risanpei
- 46632 RISE
- 4090 Říšehvězd
- 16939 Rishabhmisra
- 12900 Rishabjain
- 17124 Rishavalera
- 23133 Rishinbehl
- 33660 Rishishankar
- 34696 Risoldi
- 2654 Ristenpart
- 2690 Ristiina
- 1180 Rita
- 52426 Ritaalessandro
- 84417 Ritabo
- 15145 Ritageorge
- 542561 Ritajochen
- 170995 Ritajoewright
- 8640 Ritaschulz
- 20169 Ritchey
- 25717 Ritikmal
- 3466 Ritina
- 145452 Ritona
- 10781 Ritter
- 33189 Ritzdorf
- 378669 Rivas
- 389478 Rivera-Valentín
- 28718 Rivergrace
- 4871 Riverside
- 1426 Riviera
- 13743 Rivkin
- 200750 Rix
- 70714 Rizk
- 451138 Rizvanov
- 5945 Roachapproach
- 16421 Roadrunner
- 25139 Roatsch
- 31475 Robbacchus
- 22152 Robbennett
- 236988 Robberto
- 6057 Robbia
- 4667 Robbiesh
- 72545 Robbiiwessen
- 16647 Robbydesmet
- 9518 Robbynaish
- 19457 Robcastillo
- 57359 Robcrawford
- 21607 Robel
- 1145 Robelmonte
- 21439 Robenzing
- 1377 Roberbauxa
- 7323 Robersomma
- 20629 Robert
- 335 Roberta
- 155997 Robertaciani
- 471301 Robertajmolson
- 26499 Robertazabotti
- 4809 Robertball
- 258323 Róbertbarsa
- 296950 Robertbauer
- 143622 Robertbloch
- 337002 Robertbodzon
- 201935 Robertbraun
- 29210 Robertbrown
- 15970 Robertbrownlee
- 5739 Robertburns
- 129209 Robertburt
- 208916 Robertcaldwell
- 210070 Robertcapa
- 15965 Robertcox
- 219861 Robertdecker
- 18088 Roberteunice
- 10116 Robertfranz
- 5817 Robertfrazer
- 71538 Robertfried
- 12115 Robertgrimm
- 38967 Roberthaas
- 32005 Roberthalfon
- 34308 Roberthall
- 13937 Roberthargraves
- 71480 Roberthatt
- 25539 Roberthelm
- 32524 Roberthowie
- 30384 Robertirelan
- 33725 Robertkent
- 92892 Robertlawrence
- 20633 Robertluther
- 10786 Robertmayer
- 5109 Robertmiller
- 84200 Robertmoore
- 6017 Robertmorehead
- 6812 Robertnelson
- 96257 Roberto
- 14964 Robertobacci
- 21256 Robertobattiston
- 19517 Robertocarlos
- 135890 Robertodalzotto
- 30430 Robertoegel
- 133747 Robertofurfaro
- 91333 Robertogorelli
- 14919 Robertohaver
- 212500 Robertojoppolo
- 21189 Robertonesci
- 113683 Robertoornella
- 36213 Robertotisgreen
- 37022 Robertovittori
- 7488 Robertpaul
- 6188 Robertpepin
- 26591 Robertreeves
- 8027 Robertrushworth
- 3428 Roberts
- 196005 Róbertschiller
- 46076 Robertschottland
- 410475 Robertschulz
- 811935 Robertslobins
- 17911 Robertsnyder
- 360037 Robertson
- 30157 Robertspira
- 30881 Robertstevenson
- 7247 Robertstirling
- 228980 Robertstrain
- 45509 Robertward
- 8024 Robertwhite
- 167113 Robertwick
- 12644 Robertwielinga
- 359474 Robertwilliams
- 133743 Robertwoodward
- 2328 Robeson
- 27240 Robhall
- 27422 Robheckman
- 6312 Robheinlein
- 32018 Robhenning
- 101777 Robhoskins
- 260906 Robichon
- 20635 Robinandrews
- 43283 Robinbock
- 18932 Robinhood
- 3819 Robinson
- 7182 Robinvaughan
- 254863 Robinwarren
- 12820 Robinwilliams
- 79129 Robkoldewey
- 518458 Roblambert
- 6334 Robleonard
- 4881 Robmackintosh
- 10389 Robmanning
- 73491 Robmatson
- 58365 Robmedrano
- 21706 Robminehart
- 343662 Robmorgan
- 51659 Robohachi
- 26376 Roborosa
- 15907 Robot
- 9796 Robotti
- 30140 Robpergolizzi
- 168698 Robpickman
- 21469 Robschum
- 198963 Robsnyder
- 115449 Robson
- 20101 Robsullivan
- 4153 Roburnham
- 17879 Robutel
- 12944 Robwalrecht
- 14802 Robwardell
- 20460 Robwhiteley
- 41800 Robwilliams
- 5183 Robyn
- 5022 Roccapalumba
- 20056 Roccati
- 241529 Roccutri
- 96178 Rochambeau
- 38237 Roche
- 552385 Rochechouart
- 4172 Rochefort
- 18572 Rocher
- 573759 Rocheva
- 31000 Rockchic
- 904 Rockefellia
- 278690 Rockenbauer
- 3579 Rockholt
- 145709 Rocknowar
- 17058 Rocknroll
- 13294 Rockox
- 2529 Rockwell Kent
- 2703 Rodari
- 4659 Roddenberry
- 3873 Roddy
- 16194 Roderick
- 780857 Rodés
- 6258 Rodin
- 11257 Rodionta
- 4465 Rodita
- 15199 Rodnyanskaya
- 18689 Rodrick
- 43368 Rodrigoleiva
- 13760 Rodriguez
- 31893 Rodriguezalvarez
- 25509 Rodwong
- 28803 Roe
- 1557 Roehla
- 368704 Roelgathier
- 1657 Roemera
- 6401 Röntgen
- 4426 Roerich
- 8075 Roero
- 19927 Rogefeldt
- 69312 Rogerbacon
- 18627 Rogerbonnet
- 8168 Rogerbourke
- 3741 Rogerburns
- 7362 Rogerbyrd
- 46917 Rogercayrel
- 264474 Rogerclark
- 29874 Rogerculver
- 230975 Rogerfederer
- 301413 Rogerfux
- 333219 Rogerharrington
- 541288 Rogerhaynes
- 10076 Rogerhill
- 920 Rogeria
- 9452 Rogerpeeters
- 7894 Rogers
- 614667 Rogersmith
- 13196 Rogerssmith
- 195900 Rogersudbury
- 6651 Rogervenable
- 495181 Rogerwaters
- 33490 Roggemans
- 34594 Rohanarora
- 33379 Rohandalvi
- 34251 Rohanmehrotra
- 17231 Rohanwagh
- 22958 Rohatgi
- 24280 Rohenderson
- 444418 Rohitbhartia
- 23816 Rohitkamat
- 31696 Rohitmital
- 25321 Rohitsingh
- 8860 Rohloff
- 28689 Rohrback
- 366689 Rohrbaugh
- 215868 Rohrer
- 13435 Rohret
- 17860 Roig
- 25522 Roisen
- 333541 Roissier
- 26736 Rojeski
- 35053 Rojyurij
- 2058 Róka
- 336109 Rokiškis
- 58185 Rokkosan
- 3736 Rokoske
- 15925 Rokycany
- 25377 Rolaberee
- 15903 Rolandflorrie
- 362420 Rolandgarros
- 12870 Rolandmeier
- 56170 Rolandovillazón
- 428102 Rolandwagner
- 6508 Rolčík
- 30094 Rolfebode
- 23472 Rolfriekher
- 517894 Rolfrohwedder
- 1269 Rollandia
- 19383 Rolling Stones
- 472 Roma
- 13200 Romagnani
- 589175 Romainguélat
- 200031 Romainmontaigut
- 2516 Roman
- 22027 Romanakofler
- 179901 Romanbrajša
- 227065 Romandia
- 58572 Romanella
- 11015 Romanenko
- 18171 Romaneskue
- 20636 Romanhirsch
- 7986 Romania
- 20361 Romanishin
- 5302 Romanoserra
- 10921 Romanozen
- 3761 Romanskaya
- 66458 Romaplanetario
- 31593 Romapradhan
- 579724 Rómerflóris
- 13703 Romero
- 22717 Romeuf
- 499526 Romhányi
- 942 Romilda
- 10296 Rominadisisto
- 30265 Rominagarcía
- 10386 Romulus
- 41003 Romy
- 305660 Romyhaag
- 2285 Ron Helin
- 34836 Ronakroy
- 28594 Ronaldballouz
- 11724 Ronaldhsu
- 296945 Ronaldlaub
- 17853 Ronaldsayer
- 9923 Ronaldthiel
- 4024 Ronan
- 445818 Ronbeck
- 8680 Rone
- 76309 Ronferdie
- 34731 Ronitjain
- 16813 Ronmastaler
- 15228 Ronmiller
- 17097 Ronneuman
- 121633 Ronperison
- 10139 Ronsard
- 14697 Ronsawyer
- 13497 Ronstone
- 3293 Rontaylor
- 188693 Roosevelt
- 41107 Ropakov
- 13701 Roquebrune
- 5643 Roques
- 554317 Rorywoodhams
- 223 Rosa
- 7396 Rosa-Brusin
- 15917 Rosahavel
- 22581 Rosahemphill
- 314 Rosalia
- 34397 Rosaliebarber
- 900 Rosalinde
- 22454 Rosalylopes
- 540 Rosamunde
- 33924 Rosanaaraujo
- 79240 Rosanna
- 284996 Rosaparks
- 14812 Rosario
- 142558 Rosarno
- 34366 Rosavestal
- 22961 Rosegarcia
- 7583 Rosegger
- 6472 Rosema
- 2057 Rosemary
- 20637 Rosemarydorsey
- 11458 Rosemarypike
- 85389 Rosenauer
- 16243 Rosenbauer
- 9672 Rosenbergerezek
- 18114 Rosenbush
- 274856 Rosendosalvado
- 21610 Rosengard
- 5039 Rosenkavalier
- 152146 Rosenlappin
- 21467 Rosenstein
- 100268 Rosenthal
- 4911 Rosenzweig
- 2856 Röser
- 16543 Rosetta
- 9241 Rosfranklin
- 26400 Roshanpalli
- 5795 Roshchina
- 985 Rosina
- 22870 Rosing
- 117439 Rosner
- 4211 Rosniblett
- 223633 Rosnyaîné
- 21611 Rosoff
- 235615 Rosromkondratyuk
- 141995 Rossbeyer
- 19487 Rosscoleman
- 1646 Rosseland
- 1350 Rosselia
- 545394 Rossetter
- 8814 Rosseven
- 3969 Rossi
- 9101 Rossiglione
- 8181 Rossini
- 14973 Rossirosina
- 10084 Rossparker
- 5670 Rosstaylor
- 55427 Rosta
- 245417 Rostand
- 1440 Rostia
- 4071 Rostovdon
- 4918 Rostropovich
- 731124 Rosvick
- 615 Roswitha
- 20893 Rosymccloskey
- 21391 Rotanner
- 31414 Rotarysusa
- 73719 Rotaryterni
- 52267 Rotarytorino
- 543018 ROTAT
- 22645 Rotblat
- 7700 Rote Kapelle
- 5595 Roth
- 20512 Rothenberg
- 874 Rotraut
- 291921 Rott
- 23851 Rottman-Yang
- 5197 Rottmann
- 5412 Rou
- 1413 Roucarie
- 2978 Roudebush
- 188506 Roulet
- 27520 Rounds
- 22082 Rountree
- 2950 Rousseau
- 33524 Rousselot
- 293366 Roux
- 1518 Rovaniemi
- 4744 Rovereto
- 8809 Roversimonaco
- 12581 Rovinj
- 4599 Rowan
- 19535 Rowanatkinson
- 18196 Rowberry
- 10557 Rowland
- 43844 Rowling
- 317 Roxane
- 597319 Roxanesouad
- 14533 Roy
- 6133 Royaldutchastro
- 6901 Roybishop
- 4550 Royclarke
- 34333 Roycorgross
- 5208 Royer
- 31991 Royghosh
- 13274 Roygross
- 5718 Roykerr
- 8817 Roytraver
- 63440 Rożek
- 31174 Rozelot
- 16199 Rozenblyum
- 856173 Rozenštrauhs
- 9813 Rozgaj
- 5360 Rozhdestvenskij
- 6267 Rozhen
- 3986 Rozhkovskij
- 11469 Rozitis
- 40230 Rožmberk
- 4070 Rozov
- 257212 Rózsahegyi
- 14031 Rozyo
- 1638 Ruanda
- 546842 Ruanjiangao
- 8398 Rubbia
- 9482 Rubéndarío
- 177830 Rubenhagen
- 10151 Rubens
- 84342 Rubensdeazevedo
- 8592 Rubetra
- 10764 Rübezahl
- 11302 Rubicon
- 26906 Rubidia
- 133250 Rubik
- 5726 Rubin
- 9921 Rubincam
- 2457 Rublyov
- 4286 Rubtsov
- 2474 Ruby
- 16191 Rubyroe
- 32059 Ruchipandya
- 618090 Rucinski
- 10542 Ruckers
- 90806 Rudaki
- 3574 Rudaux
- 25052 Rudawska
- 7073 Rudbelia
- 18294 Rudenko
- 5888 Ruders
- 157491 Rüdigerkollar
- 120643 Rudimandl
- 128622 Rudiš
- 1907 Rudneva
- 44613 Rudolf
- 251595 Rudolfböttger
- 13107 Rudolfdvorak
- 4146 Rudolfinum
- 74764 Rudolfpešek
- 10356 Rudolfsteiner
- 22184 Rudolfveltman
- 11770 Rudominkowski
- 2629 Rudra
- 10010 Rudruna
- 171424 Rudyfernández
- 167960 Rudzikas
- 280640 Ruetsch
- 8149 Ruff
- 8587 Ruficollis
- 345972 Rufin
- 4107 Rufino
- 33158 Rúfus
- 21074 Rügen
- 12035 Ruggieri
- 27591 Rugilmartin
- 11214 Ruhisayana
- 13262 Ruhiyusuf
- 15762 Rühmann
- 15273 Ruhmkorff
- 4073 Ruianzhongxue
- 4101 Ruikou
- 17086 Ruima
- 28538 Ruisong
- 22910 Ruiwang
- 15395 Rükl
- 21732 Rumery
- 145451 Rumina
- 21044 Rummel
- 5139 Rumoi
- 1773 Rumpelstilz
- 4154 Rumsey
- 5495 Rumyantsev
- 4570 Runcorn
- 166349 Rundell
- 5505 Rundetaarn
- 11853 Runge
- 4662 Runk
- 501132 Runkel
- 2899 Runrun Shaw
- 25933 Ruoyijiang
- 17180 Rupertli
- 353 Ruperto-Carola
- 1953 Rupertwildt
- 152341 Rupesnigra
- 1443 Ruppina
- 13932 Rupprecht
- 4455 Ruriko
- 3756 Ruscannon
- 3516 Rusheva
- 365604 Rusholme
- 26390 Rušin
- 19633 Rusjan
- 4810 Ruslanova
- 69311 Russ
- 1762 Russell
- 23769 Russellbabb
- 15582 Russellburrows
- 12248 Russellcarpenter
- 100485 Russelldavies
- 119424 Russelldurkee
- 3952 Russellmark
- 34321 Russellmotter
- 329069 Russellporter
- 43763 Russert
- 29839 Russhoward
- 232 Russia
- 11955 Russrobb
- 243526 Russwalker
- 52263 Rustamov
- 1171 Rusthawelia
- 38541 Rustichelli
- 17033 Rusty
- 9326 Ruta
- 14815 Rutberg
- 283786 Rutebeuf
- 20478 Rutenberg
- 5886 Rutger
- 798 Ruth
- 3285 Ruth Wolfe
- 22890 Ruthaellis
- 65363 Ruthanna
- 5311 Rutherford
- 1249 Rutherfordia
- 34841 Ruthgottesman
- 225239 Ruthproell
- 543061 Ruthsager
- 2518 Rutllant
- 236810 Rutten
- 133161 Ruttkai
- 33856 Rutuparekh
- 1427 Ruvuma
- 585635 Ruxandratoma
- 1856 Růžena
- 5344 Ryabov
- 21936 Ryan
- 28894 Ryanchung
- 12864 Ryandrake
- 28593 Ryanhamilton
- 21427 Ryanharrison
- 29631 Ryankenny
- 19597 Ryanlee
- 20794 Ryanolson
- 333588 Ryanpaquette
- 5575 Ryanpark
- 34159 Ryanthorpe
- 17127 Ryanwestcott
- 20595 Ryanwisnoski
- 4258 Ryazanov
- 2523 Ryba
- 12674 Rybalka
- 583972 Rybnikov
- 10506 Rydberg
- 20645 Ryderstrauss
- 19663 Rykerwatts
- 9566 Rykhlova
- 12877 Rylangardner
- 8927 Ryojiro
- 11135 Ryokami
- 6031 Ryokan
- 13162 Ryokkochigaku
- 2835 Ryoma
- 8304 Ryomichico
- 25106 Ryoojungmin
- 23180 Ryosuke
- 46580 Ryouichiirie
- 21460 Ryozo
- 16175 Rypatterson
- 182044 Ryschkewitsch
- 48495 Ryugado
- 20120 Ryugatake
- 162173 Ryugu
- 5969 Ryuichiro
- 20647 Ryujiokazaki
- 20648 Ryukihyodo
- 42566 Ryutaro
- 6444 Ryuzin
- 5343 Ryzhov
back to top

== See also ==
- List of minor planet discoverers
- List of observatory codes
- Meanings of minor planet names § Index
