= USS Maury (AGS-16) =

Cargo ship of the United States Navy

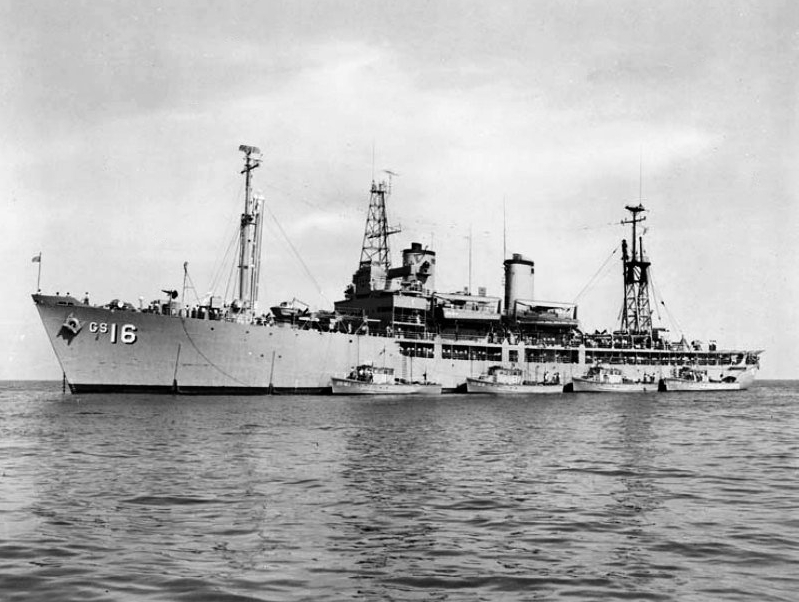
- Survey ship USS Maury (AGS-16) at anchor, Mekong Delta, Vietnam, April 1967

History

United States
- Name: Renate (1945–1946); Maury (1946–1969)
- Namesake: The asteroid Renate; Matthew Fontaine Maury
- Builder: Walsh-Kaiser Company, Providence, Rhode Island
- Laid down: 21 November 1944
- Launched: 31 January 1945
- Commissioned: 28 February 1945
- Decommissioned: 19 December 1969
- Renamed: Maury, 12 July 1946
- Reclassified: AGS-16 (survey ship), 12 July 1946
- Stricken: 19 December 1969
- Honours and awards: 6 battle stars and Meritorious Unit Commendation (Vietnam)
- Fate: Sold for scrap in 1973

General characteristics Extensive reconfiguration as survey ship 1946.
- Class & type: Artemis-class attack cargo ship
- Type: S4–SE2–BE1
- Displacement: 4,087 long tons (4,153 t) light; 7,080 long tons (7,194 t) full
- Length: 426 ft (130 m)
- Beam: 58 ft (18 m)
- Draft: 16 ft (4.9 m)
- Speed: 16.9 knots (31.3 km/h; 19.4 mph)
- Complement: 303 officers and enlisted
- Armament: 1 × 5"/38 caliber gun mount; 4 × twin 40 mm gun mounts; 10 × 20 mm gun mounts
- Notes: 1946 conversion: New silhouette. survey equipment, photographic, printing, and repair shops, helipad, helicopter, and sound boats.

USS Maury (AGS-16) was a hydrographic surveying ship in service with the United States Navy from 1945 to 1969.

The ship was originally laid down under a Maritime Commission contract (MC Hull 1897) as USS Renate (AKA-36) on 21 November 1944 at Providence, R.I., by Walsh-Kaiser Co., Inc.; launched on 31 January 1945; sponsored by Mrs. Joseph L. Baker; and commissioned at State Pier No.1, Providence, on 28 February 1945. Renate was an Artemis-class attack cargo ship named after the minor planet 575 Renate. "Renate" is a female German surname derived from Latin "renatus" (= born again). The ship was later converted for hydrographic missions and renamed Maury (AGS-16) in 1946, named after the astronomer and hydrographer Matthew Fontaine Maury.

== Service history ==
=== World War II, 1945–1946 ===
After completing her fitting-out at Boston, Massachusetts (USA), Renate conducted shakedown training in Chesapeake Bay (13–19 March), after which time she underwent post-shakedown availability at the Norfolk Navy Yard, Portsmouth, Virginia (USA); she ultimately sailed for the Panama Canal Zone on 31 March 1945. After transiting the canal, she arrived at Balboa on 6 April, and sailed thence two days later, bound for Hawaiian waters and steaming independently. Renate reached Pearl Harbor on 21 April, underwent an inspection six days later, and completed discharging cargo on the 29th.

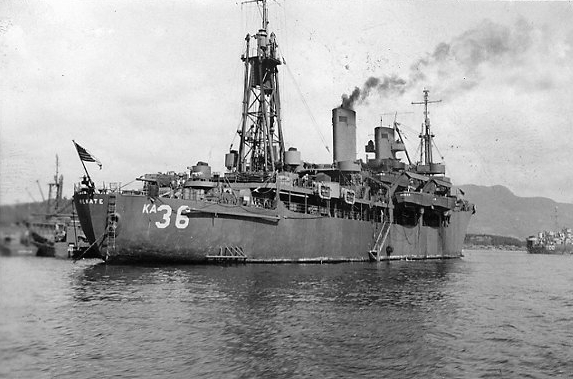
USS Renate (AKA-36) at Sasebo in 1945.

Bringing cargo-loading operations to completion on 13 May, Renate embarked 197 enlisted passengers — sailors, marines, and soldiers — and two naval officers for transportation the following day, and sailed for the Marshall Islands. Steaming independently, her men standing daily dawn and dusk alerts, the attack cargo ship crossed the 180th meridian on 18 May, and ultimately reached Eniwetok on the 22nd. Pushing on, bound for the western Carolines, on 5 June, she followed a lone course to Ulithi, arriving on 9 June. Next assigned to convoy UOK-36, Renate got underway for Okinawa on 10 July, dropping anchor in Buckner Bay on the 14th. Interrupting cargo operations to sortie on 19 July to evade a typhoon, she ultimately completed discharging cargo five days later, getting underway to return to Ulithi on 25 July with convoy OKU-16.

Anchoring in Ulithi lagoon on the last day of July, Renate got underway on 2 August for Pearl Harbor. Again steaming independently, she crossed the International Date Line on 10 August, and reached her destination on the 13th. Shifting to Kahului, Maui, ten days later, she completed cargo operations the following day, and sailed to return to Pearl on the 25th.

Departing on 14 May, she returned to Hawaii the day before the Surrender of Japan and was assigned to Operation "Campus", the occupation of the Japan's home islands. She got underway for Kyūshū 1 September, mooring 16 days later at Sasebo where she disembarked units of the U.S. 5th Marine Division. Completing another occupation troop lift, from the Philippines to Sasebo, in early October, she joined in operation Operation "Magic Carpet", the transportation of veterans back to the United States. With San Francisco as her terminus she completed two "Magic Carpet" runs by mid January 1946.

The next month she sailed for the East Coast, arriving at Norfolk on the 26th.

=== Conversion to survey ship, 1946 ===
In June 1946, she entered Portsmouth Naval Shipyard for conversion to a survey ship and on 12 July was renamed Maury designated AGS-16. As Maury she emerged from the shipyard in October with a new silhouette. Electronic survey and sounding equipment, as well as photographic, printing, and repair shops had been added within her compartments and a helipad, helicopter, and sound boats had been provided topside. The boats would be used in charting positions and depths accurately, while the ship's helicopter would transport surveyors and their equipment to points ashore and perform aerial photographic missions.

On 6 January 1947 Maury got underway for the Pacific and her first hydrographic mission, the charting of the waters around Truk and Kwajalein. Having added to navigational knowledge of those areas she sailed for San Francisco, arriving on 13 September and remaining until 11 July 1948. She then got underway for New York City where she reported for duty with Service Force, Atlantic Fleet, on 10 August.

=== Atlantic Fleet, 1948–1959 ===
During 1949, 1950, and 1951, Maury made three 8-month cruises to the Persian Gulf, constructing charts of those waters, accompanied by the tugs Allegheny and Stallion. In October 1952, in concert with USS Sheldrake (AGS-19) and USS Prevail (AGS-20) she began a resurvey of the North Atlantic, to correct existing false soundings on navigational charts and studying methods for hurricane and weather predictions. Through 1957 she served in the Western Atlantic, surveying as far north as Newfoundland in the summer months and working to the south, as far as the West Indies, during the winter.

In 1958 Maury returned to the Mediterranean for an abbreviated deployment, from 3 February to 9 May. In July her North Atlantic resurvey missions were extended and she crossed the ocean to chart the waters in and around the Shetland and Faroe Islands. Throughout this period, while fulfilling her primary assignment of correcting navigational charts, she added to meteorological knowledge by studying the North Atlantic's weather patterns, particularly with regard to hurricanes.

Early in the Spring of 1959 Maury again passed through the Straits of Gibraltar. Continuing on to the Eastern Mediterranean she began a study of the Turkish coast. By September she was ready to extend that survey to the Turkish Black Sea coast and on the 17th and 18th transited the Dardanelles. Maury thus became the first U.S. naval unit to enter the Black Sea since 1945. Also Odessa Russia 1959.

=== Pacific Fleet, 1960–1969 ===
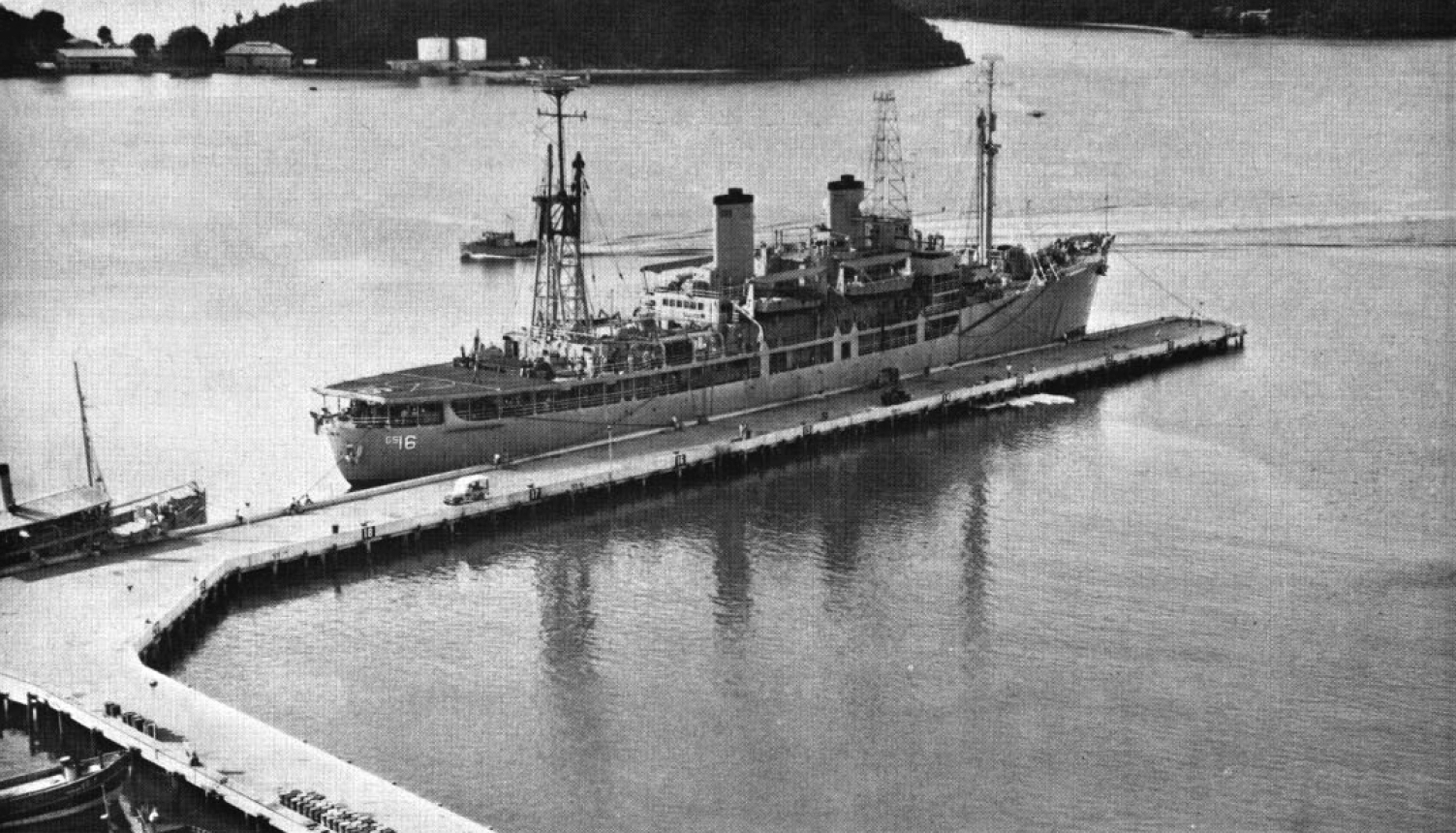
Maury in Thailand, circa 1961.

The next year, 1960, Maury was transferred to the Pacific Fleet and by 22 March was operating out of Pearl Harbor. Attached to the 7th Fleet's logistic support group during her extended cruises, she completed a preliminary survey of the Gulf of Siam in preparation for her next long range assignment, an accurate survey of designated areas of the southwestern Pacific and Indian Oceans. After modernization at Pearl Harbor, she returned to the Gulf of Siam in December with USS Serrano. Working in concert, Maury concentrated on hydrographic survey, while Serrano gathered information on the physical and chemical makeup of the waters and ocean floor. During their 1961, 1962 and 1963 7th Fleet tours, the oceanographic vessels charted and collected data on the Gulf of Siam, the Andaman Sea, the Straits of Malacca and areas of the Philippines, punctuating those tours with missions of mercy as the occasion demanded.

On 1 February 1965 Maury departed Pearl Harbor for a 4-month survey of the continental shelf off Buenaventura, Colombia. Returning to Oahu on 2 June, she began preparations for her return to Southeast Asia. Departing on 15 November she soon commenced a 7-month survey of the coast of South Vietnam. Concentrating on the Mekong Delta area during that cruise, she has resumed her study of the Vietnamese coast with each annual deployment. Into 1969 her efforts added significantly to knowledge of the characteristics of the coastal area in which U.S. naval forces conducted riverine warfare and amphibious operations.

After completing her last operational survey operations, off the coast of the Republic of Korea, Maury sailed for the United States. Pausing at Pearl Harbor en route, she stood out for the West Coast on her final voyage on 1 December 1969.

=== Decommissioning ===
She reached San Francisco on 8 December 1969, off-loading fuel, ammunition, and vehicles before shifting to the Naval Inactive Ship Maintenance Facility, Mare Island, Vallejo, California (USA), later the same day. Decommissioned on 19 December 1969, Maury was stricken from the Naval Vessel Register the same day. The ship remained at the Inactive Ship Maintenance Facility until transferred to the custody of the Maritime Administration (MARAD) on 26 June 1970. Taken to MARAD's Suisun Bay, California, berthing area, she remained there until sold to the National Steel and Metal Co., of Terminal Island, Calif., on 10 August 1973 to be broken up for scrap.

== Awards ==
- Asiatic-Pacific Campaign Medal
- World War II Victory Medal
- Navy Occupation Medal with "ASIA" clasp
- National Defense Service Medal with star
