= Ruppina =

Ruppina can refer to:

- Ruppina (singer), a J-pop singer also known as "Mai"
- 1443 Ruppina, an asteroid discovered in 1937
