= Rhodia =

Rhodia may refer to:

- In Greek mythology:
  - Rhodia, a goddess, one of the Muses
  - Rhodea, Rhodeia, or Rhodia, a nymph, one of the Oceanids
  - Rhodia, one of the Danaïdes, daughters of Danaus, king of Libya
- Rhodia, a city, also called Rhodiopolis, of ancient Lycia
- 437 Rhodia, an asteroid
- Rhodia (company), a French chemical company
- Rhodia, a fictional planet in The Stars, Like Dust, an Isaac Asimov novel

== See also ==
- Lex Rhodia, a Byzantine law
