= NASA Silver Achievement Medal =

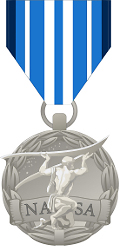
- Type: Medal
- Country: United States
- Presented by: the National Aeronautics and Space Administration
- Eligibility: Government and non-government individuals or teams
- Status: Active
- Established: 2012
- NASA Silver Achievement Ribbon

Precedence
- Next (higher): NASA Early Career Achievement Medal
- Next (lower): NASA Group Achievement Award

The NASA Silver Achievement Medal (SAM) is awarded to any government or non-government individuals or teams "for a stellar achievement that supports one or more of NASA's Core Values, when it is deemed to be extraordinarily important and appropriate to recognize such achievement in a timely and personalized manner."

== Recipients ==
- Tracy Gibson
- Stacy Dees
- Dani Mendoza DellaGiustina
- Antonella Barucci
- Patrick Michel
- Eric Mucklow
- Daniel Duncavage
- Billy Baker
- Wanda Bibens
- Heston Briant
- Michael Chopard
- Marcelo DaSilva
- Shannon Davis
- H. Preston Easton
- Joshua Eberst
- Tammy Edelman
- Nathan Estey
- Francis Fajardo
- Cheryl Fitz-Simon
- Pierre Gravelat
- Rebecca Haerr
- Eric B. Hall
- Lelia Hancock
- Marjorie Harrison
- Kyle Hauer
- Jeffrey F. Haught
- Katherine Hensley
- Mark Hiscox
- Jake Hochstadt
- Luke Hoffman
- Juston Junod
- Fred Kuo
- Deborah Lapinski
- Kelly Lloyd
- Sherri McMillion
- Jansen Moon
- Jennifer Morgan
- Timothy Morgan
- Henry Morrow
- Janice Nieves
- Mathew Ontko
- Bob Payn
- Jordan Rasmussen
- William Seelmann
- Richard Simpkins
- Andrew Spear
- Casey L. Swails
- Robert Tibbling
- Dane C. Tiemeier
- Jason M. Valenzuela
- Stephen D. Van Genderen
- Leanne Victory
- Hope Wade
- Braulio Welch
- Michelle Wessner
- Tanya Lippincott
- James Whitehead
- James Young
- Ronnie J. Celella
- Jennifer D. Adriany
- Thomas Wallbillich
- Robert W. Williams
- Alyssa Yockey
- Hal Greenlee
- Winston W. Wedgeworth III
- Michael Lyle
- David Hohn
