= R. Scott Dunbar =

American astronomer

Minor planets discovered: 10
3360 Syrinx	4 November 1981	MPC
3362 Khufu	30 August 1984	MPC
3551 Verenia	12 September 1983	MPC
6065 Chesneau	27 July 1987	MPC
6435 Daveross	24 February 1984	MPC
7163 Barenboim	24 February 1984	MPC
(46540) 1983 LD	13 June 1983	MPC
(96177) 1984 BC	30 January 1984	MPC
(168316) 1982 WD	25 November 1982	MPC
(267004) 1981 UA	21 October 1981	MPC
also see Category:Discoveries by R. Scott Dunbar

Roy Scott Dunbar is an American astronomer, planetologist and discoverer of comets and minor planets.

Dunbar played an active role in the Palomar Planet-Crossing Asteroid Survey. The Minor Planet Center credits him with the (co-)discovery of 10 numbered minor planets during 1981–1987.

His most notable discoveries include the potentially hazardous object and Aten asteroid 3362 Khufu, which he co-discovered with Maria A. Barucci, as well as the near-Earth object, Mars-crosser and Aten asteroid, 3551 Verenia. Together with Eleanor Helin he co-discovered the minor planets 3360 Syrinx, 6065 Chesneau, 6435 Daveross and 7163 Barenboim.

Dunbar and Helin also claimed the discovery of comet 1980 p, which turned out not to exist. It was a ghost image of Alpha Leonis.

The main-belt asteroid 3718 Dunbar, discovered by Eleanor Helin and Schelte Bus, is named after him. Naming citation was published on 2 April 1988 (M.P.C. 12976).
