= 4055 Magellan =

Near-Earth asteroid

Discovery
- Discovered by: E. Helin
- Discovery site: Palomar Obs.
- Discovery date: 24 February 1985

Designations
- Pronunciation: US: /məˈdʒɛlən/, UK: /məˈɡɛlən/
- Named after: Ferdinand Magellan (Portuguese navigator)
- Alternative designations: 1985 DO_{2} · 1988 OG
- Minor planet category: NEO · Amor

Orbital characteristics
- Epoch 4 September 2017 (JD 2458000.5)
- Uncertainty parameter 0
- Observation arc: 32.40 yr (11,835 days)
- Aphelion: 2.4140 AU
- Perihelion: 1.2270 AU
- Semi-major axis: 1.8205 AU
- Eccentricity: 0.3260
- Orbital period (sidereal): 2.46 yr (897 days)
- Mean anomaly: 303.89°
- Mean motion: 0° 24^{m} 4.68^{s} / day
- Inclination: 23.251°
- Longitude of ascending node: 164.85°
- Argument of perihelion: 154.36°
- Earth MOID: 0.2398 AU · 93.4 LD

Physical characteristics
- Dimensions: 2.204±0.078 km 2.49 km 2.781±0.147 km
- Synodic rotation period: 6.384±0.005 h 7.475±0.001 h (Note: Pravec (2000) web: rotation period 7.475±0.001 hours with a brightness amplitude of 0.46 mag and an undefined LCDB quality code (Pravec, P.; Wolf, M.; Sarounova, L. (2000)) Summary figures for (4055) Magellan at Collaborative Asteroid Lightcurve Link (CALL)); 7.479±0.001 h 7.4805±0.0013 h 7.48202±0.0001 h 7.488±0.001; 7.496±0.005 h
- Geometric albedo: 0.31; 0.330±0.067; 0.36±0.27; 0.415±0.071
- Spectral type: V (Tholen); V (SMASS); V
- Absolute magnitude (H): 14.00 · 14.45±0.2 (R) · 14.515±0.002 (R) · 14.6 · 14.64±0.56 · 14.7 · 14.9 · 14.90±0.3

4055 Magellan, provisional designation 1985 DO_{2}, is a bright asteroid and near-Earth object of the Amor group. It is approximately 2.5 kilometers (1.6 mi) in diameter, and its orbit is moderately eccentric. It was discovered on 24 February 1985, by American astronomer Eleanor Helin at Palomar Observatory in California, United States. It was later named for Portuguese explorer Ferdinand Magellan.

== Orbit and classification ==
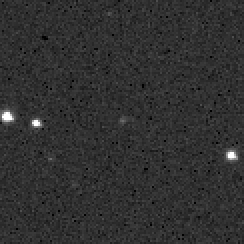
Magellan (center) as seen from ground in July 2010

Magellan orbits the Sun in the inner main-belt at a distance of 1.2–2 AU (180,000,000–300,000,000 km) once every 2 years and 6 months (897 days). Its orbit has an eccentricity of 0.33 and an inclination of 23° with respect to the ecliptic.

The first observation was made at the Australian Siding Spring Observatory, extending the asteroid's observation arc by just one month prior to its official discovery observation at Palomar.

It has a minimum orbital intersection distance with Earth of 0.2398 AU (35,900,000 km), which corresponds to 93.4 lunar distances.

== Physical characteristics ==
Being a V-type asteroid in the Tholen and SMASS taxonomy, Magellan is thought to have originated from the Rheasilvia crater, a large impact crater on the south-polar surface of 4 Vesta, which is the main-belt's second-most-massive asteroid after 1 Ceres.

=== Diameter and albedo ===
According to observations by the Keck Observatory and to the survey carried out by NASA's Wide-field Infrared Survey Explorer with its subsequent NEOWISE mission, Magellan measures between 2.2 and 2.8 kilometers (1.4 and 1.7 mi) in diameter and its surface has a high albedo of 0.31 to 0.33. The Collaborative Asteroid Lightcurve Link (LCDB) agrees with the Keck observations, adopting an albedo of 0.31 and a diameter of 2.49 kilometers (1.55 mi).

=== Lightcurves ===
Between 2000 and 2015, six rotational lightcurves of Magellan were obtained from photometric observations by astronomers Petr Pravec and Brian D. Warner, as well as by the Mexican Asteroid Photometry Campaign and the Palomar Transient Factory. The highest rated lightcurve by LCDB's standards was obtained by French amateur astronomer David Romeuf in July 2015, which gave a rotation period of 7.48202±0.0001 hours with a brightness variation of 0.45 magnitude (U=3). The large variation suggests an elongated shape.

== Naming ==
This minor planet was named after Portuguese navigator and explorer Ferdinand Magellan (Fernão de Magalhães; c. 1480–1521), who led and died on the first circumnavigation of the Earth during 1519–1522. The minor planet is also named after the modern Magellan spacecraft, which was launched by NASA in 1989 and went on to map the surface of Venus. The Portuguese navigator is also honored by the craters Magelhaens on Mars and Magelhaens on the Moon. The official naming citation was published by the Minor Planet Center on 2 December 1990 (M.P.C. 17466).

== See also ==
- HED meteorite
- 3908 Nyx
- 3551 Verenia
