= Daniella Mendoza DellaGiustina =

Mexican American planetary scientist and academic

- Occupations: Planetary scientist and academic
- Awards: Award for Development of the OSIRIS-REx mission ground system, NASA; Silver Achievement Medal for OSIRIS-REx Site Selection, NASA

Academic background
- Education: Bachelor of Science in Physics; Master of Science in Computational Physics; Doctor of Philosophy in Geosciences
- Alma mater: The University of Arizona; The University of Alaska Fairbanks

Daniella ("Dani") Mendoza DellaGiustina is a Mexican American planetary scientist and academic. She is the principal investigator for NASA's OSIRIS-APEX Mission to asteroid (99942) Apophis, Deputy Principal Investigator of NASA's OSIRIS-REx Asteroid Sample Return Mission, and assistant professor at the University of Arizona's Lunar and Planetary Laboratory.

DellaGiustina received the NASA Silver Achievement Medal for her contributions to the success of NASA's first Asteroid Sample Return Mission. Her areas of interest and research expertise lie in the fields of surface processes, geophysical and remote sensing instrument development, planetary analog field testing, and water distribution in the Solar System.

== Education ==
DellaGiustina completed her Bachelor of Science in physics from the University of Arizona in 2008. She then received a Master of Science in computational physics from the University of Alaska Fairbanks in 2011. Later, she earned a PhD in geosciences from the University of Arizona in 2021 while working concurrently as a research scientist.

== Career ==
DellaGiustina is the image processing lead and deputy principal investigator of NASA's OSIRIS-REx Asteroid Sample Return Mission and is the Principal Investigator of NASA's OSIRIS-APEX Mission to Apophis. She is also the assistant professor at the University of Arizona, Lunar and Planetary Laboratory.

== Research ==
DellaGiustina is most known for her contributions to the field of planetary sciences, particularly in the area of asteroid remote sensing and spacecraft instrument development. Her research focuses on the study of asteroids and moons, as well as the use of remote sensing and seismic techniques to investigate planetary surfaces, structures, and dynamics. Since 2017 she has been working on the development of spaceflight seismic instruments and testing them in planetary analog environments on Earth.

=== Composition and structure of asteroid Bennu ===
DellaGiustina has conducted research aimed at analyzing the surface evolution of asteroids, with a specific focus on the asteroid Bennu. While investigating the formation and degradation patterns on the surface of asteroid Bennu, she co-led a study that discovered variations in boulders with differing albedo and physical characteristics, suggesting that the boulder's ages range from the time of the parent body's formation and subsequent disruption to the recent production in near-Earth space. With regards to her research into the reflectance and colour variations observed on Bennu's surface, her work indicated that the heterogeneity of its primordial materials, coupled with varying exposure times, are responsible for the observed variations, and also implied that the progression of space weathering follows a distinct trend rather than a predictable red-to-blue or blue-to-red pattern. This unusual space weathering pattern may be related to asteroid Bennu's hydration state. She is also responsible for the discovery of material from asteroid Vesta implanted on Bennu's surface, likely from an impact on its parent body.

== Awards and honors ==
- 2017 – Group Achievement Award for development of the OSIRIS-REx mission ground system, NASA
- 2018 – Group Achievement Award for the OSIRIS-REx Earth Gravity Assist, NASA
- 2020 – Group Achievement Award for the OSIRIS-REx Approach & Preliminary Survey, NASA
- 2020 – Silver Achievement Medal for OSIRIS-REx Site Selection, NASA
- 2022 – Woman of Impact, University of Arizona
- 2022 – Brilliant 10, Popular Science Magazine

== Selected articles ==
- DellaGiustina, D. N., Bennett, C. A., Becker, K., Golish, D. R., Le Corre, L., Cook, D. A., ... & Lauretta, D. S. (2018). Overcoming the challenges associated with image‐based mapping of small bodies in preparation for the OSIRIS‐REx mission to (101955) Bennu. Earth and Space Science, 5(12), 929–949.
- Lauretta, D. S., DellaGiustina, D. N., Bennett, C. A., Golish, D. R., Becker, K. J., Balram-Knutson, S. S., ... & Wolner, C. W. V. (2019). The unexpected surface of asteroid (101955) Bennu. Nature, 568(7750), 55–60.
- DellaGiustina, D. N., Emery, J. P., Golish, D. R., Rozitis, B., Bennett, C. A., Burke, K. N., ... & Lauretta, D. S. (2019). Properties of rubble-pile asteroid (101955) Bennu from OSIRIS-REx imaging and thermal analysis. Nature Astronomy, 3(4), 341–351.
- DellaGiustina, D. N., Burke, K. N., Walsh, K. J., Smith, P. H., Golish, D. R., Bierhaus, E. B., ... & Lauretta, D. S. (2020). Variations in color and reflectance on the surface of asteroid (101955) Bennu. Science, 370(6517), eabc3660.
- DellaGiustina, D. N., Kaplan, H. H., Simon, A. A., Bottke, W. F., Avdellidou, C., Delbo, M., ... & Lauretta, D. S. (2021). Exogenic basalt on asteroid (101955) Bennu. Nature Astronomy, 5(1), 31–38.
