= 3551 Verenia =

Mars-crossing asteroid

Discovery
- Discovered by: R. S. Dunbar
- Discovery date: 12 September 1983

Designations
- Pronunciation: /vɪˈriːniə/
- Alternative designations: MPO 337280
- Minor planet category: Mars crosser; Amor II

Orbital characteristics
- Epoch 13 January 2016 (JD 2457400.5)
- Uncertainty parameter 0
- Observation arc: 11898 days (32.57 yr)
- Aphelion: 3.11250 AU (465,623,000 km)
- Perihelion: 1.07179 AU (160,338,000 km)
- Semi-major axis: 2.09214 AU (312,980,000 km)
- Eccentricity: 0.48771
- Orbital period (sidereal): 3.03 yr (1105.3 d)
- Mean anomaly: 241.121°
- Mean motion: 0° 19^{m} 32.516^{s} / day
- Inclination: 9.51540°
- Longitude of ascending node: 173.840°
- Argument of perihelion: 193.241°
- Earth MOID: 0.0719179 AU (10,758,760 km)

Physical characteristics
- Dimensions: 0.9 km
- Synodic rotation period: 4.930 h (0.2054 d)
- Geometric albedo: 0.37
- Spectral type: V
- Absolute magnitude (H): 16.75

3551 Verenia, provisional designation 1983 RD, is an Amor asteroid and a Mars crosser discovered on 12 September 1983 by R. Scott Dunbar. Although Verenia passed within 0.27 AU (40×10^{6} km) of the Earth in the 20th century, it will never do so in the 21st. In 2028, it will come within 0.025 AU (3.7×10^{6} km) of Ceres.

3551 Verenia was named for the first Vestal Virgin consecrated by the legendary Roman king Numa Pompilius.

== See also ==
- V-type asteroid
- HED meteorite
- 4 Vesta
- 4055 Magellan
- 3908 Nyx
