= 3362 Khufu =

Near-Earth asteroid

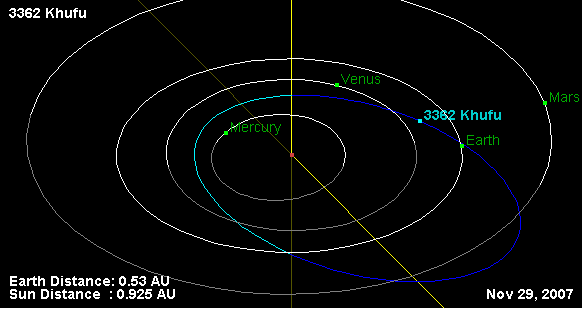
- 3362 Khufu on 29 November 2007; Khufu takes about 359.47 days to orbit the Sun.

Discovery
- Discovered by: R. S. Dunbar; M. A. Barucci
- Discovery site: Palomar
- Discovery date: 30 August 1984

Designations
- Pronunciation: /ˈkuːfuː/
- Minor planet category: PHA

Orbital characteristics
- Epoch 13 January 2016 (JD 2457400.5)
- Uncertainty parameter 0
- Observation arc: 7394 days (20.24 yr)
- Aphelion: 1.4531 AU (217.38 Gm)
- Perihelion: 0.52589 AU (78.672 Gm)
- Semi-major axis: 0.98951 AU (148.029 Gm)
- Eccentricity: 0.46853
- Orbital period (sidereal): 0.98 yr (359.5 d)
- Mean anomaly: 35.759°
- Mean motion: 1.0013°/day
- Inclination: 9.9173°
- Longitude of ascending node: 152.45°
- Argument of perihelion: 55.035°
- Earth MOID: 0.0130121 AU (1.94658 Gm)

Physical characteristics
- Dimensions: 0.7 km
- Mean radius: 0.35 km
- Geometric albedo: 0.21
- Spectral type: B-type asteroid
- Absolute magnitude (H): 18.3

3362 Khufu is a near-Earth asteroid. It was discovered by R. Scott Dunbar and Maria A. Barucci at the Palomar Observatory in San Diego County, California, on 30 August 1984. Its provisional designation was 1984 QA. It is named after Khufu, an ancient Egyptian pharaoh. Khufu was the 4th Aten asteroid to be numbered.

33 Khufu is a potentially hazardous asteroid (PHA) because its minimum orbit intersection distance (MOID) is less than 0.05 AU and its diameter is greater than 150 meters. The Earth-MOID is 0.0135 AU (2,020,000 km; 1,250,000 mi). Its orbit is well-determined for the next several hundred years.

Khufu crosses the orbits of Mars, Earth, and Venus and makes close approaches to Mercury as well. From 1900 to 2100 it drew nearer than 30 million km (0.2 AU) to Mercury 26, Venus 27, Earth 20, and Mars 11 times.

== Orbit ==
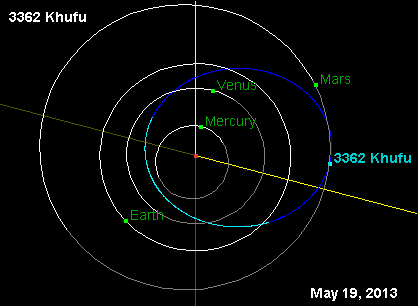

== See also ==
- Venus-crosser asteroid
- Mars-crosser asteroid
