= USS Serrano =

Tugboat of the United States Navy

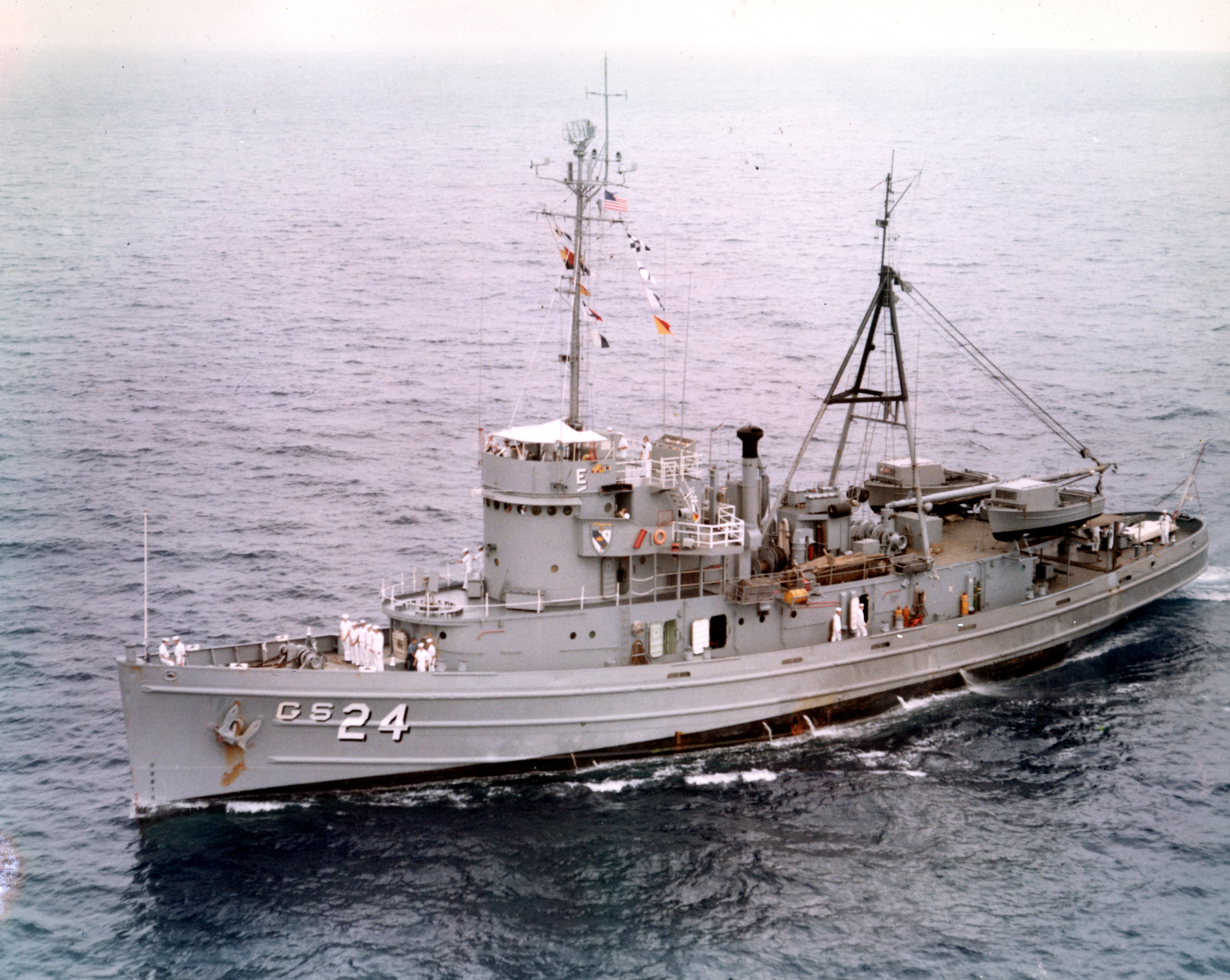

History

United States
- Name: Serrano
- Builder: United Engineering Co.
- Laid down: 6 March 1943
- Launched: 24 July 1943
- Sponsored by: Mrs. Sidney E. Fraser
- Commissioned: 22 September 1944
- Decommissioned: 2 January 1970
- Reclassified: AGS-24 on 30 June 1960
- Stricken: 2 January 1970
- Honors and awards: one battle star for World War II service; six campaign stars for Vietnam service.
- Fate: Sold for scrapping 2 November 1971

General characteristics
- Class & type: Abnaki-class tug
- Displacement: 1,330
- Length: 205 ft (62 m)
- Beam: 38 ft 6 in (11.73 m)
- Draft: 15 ft 4 in (4.67 m)
- Speed: 16 kn (30 km/h; 18 mph)
- Complement: 85
- Armament: 1 x 3 in (76 mm) gun; 2 x 40 mm guns

USS Serrano (ATF-112) was an Abnaki-class tug of the United States Navy. She was laid down on 6 March 1943 by the United Engineering Co., Alameda, California, United States, and launched on 24 July 1943, sponsored by Mrs. Sidney E. Fraser. Serrano was commissioned on 22 September 1944. After six years of service, Serrano was decommissioned in 1950. After spending ten years in reserve, she was reactivated, converted to a surveying ship and re-designated AGS-24. She served in that role until 1970.

== Fleet Ocean Tug, 1944-1950 ==
=== World War II service ===
Completing her shakedown in November, Serrano took three barges in tow at Port Hueneme and sailed for Hawaii, arriving at Pearl Harbor on 17 December. She reported to Service Squadron (ServRon) 10 the same day and, on the 23d, joined a westbound convoy. By the end of January 1945, she had delivered yard craft to Eniwetok and Guam. In early February, she moved on to the Palaus and, at mid-month, arrived in San Pedro Bay, Leyte, P.I., with an ARD and a YF in tow. On the 20th, she got underway for the Admiralties and, by the end of the month, was en route back to the Palaus.

For over two months, she continued oceanic towing operations, ranging from the Philippines to the Marianas. From mid-May to mid-June, she provided salvage services in the Ulithi area; then, on the 16th, she sailed for Okinawa.

Serrano arrived in Buckner Bay and joined ServRon 12 on 28 June. Through the end of the war, she conducted salvage operations and provided assistance to battle-damaged ships in the Okinawa-Kerama Retto area; and, at the end of August, joined Tenino (ATF-115) in towing USS Pennsylvania (BB-38) to Guam. She then returned to Okinawa for further occupation duty.

On 25 September, the fleet tug joined Amphibious Group (PhibGroup) 8 at Wakayama, Japan. After three weeks of various duties, including cargo carrying operations, she commenced docking and undocking duties at Nagoya. In early December, she interrupted that work to support the mine detection force then clearing the waters of Ise Wan. At mid-month, she returned to Nagoya.

Serrano remained in the Far East, providing tug, rescue, salvage, and fire fighting services in Japanese, Chinese, Philippine, and Okinawan waters, into the summer of 1946. In August, she headed east and, after delivering tows to Guam and Pearl Harbor, reached California in early October.

=== Post-war service ===
Retained on the active list through the 1940s, Serrano operated in the Trust Territories during 1947. In 1948, she returned to the eastern Pacific and, into the summer of 1949, operated in the Hawaiian Islands and off the west coast. She then moved north for operations in the Aleutians before returning to California in February 1950 for inactivation. On 31 May, Serrano was decommissioned and berthed with the Pacific Reserve Fleet at San Francisco.

== Surveying Ship, 1960-1970 ==
In 1951, Serrano was towed to San Diego where she remained until ordered activated and converted for hydrographic survey and oceanographic research work in 1960. With the designation AGS-24, she was recommissioned on 30 June 1960; and, 10 weeks later, she sailed for her homeport, Pearl Harbor.

On 1 November, in company with USS Maury (AGS-16), Serrano continued west to conduct a cable survey as far as Guam. From the Marianas, she proceeded via the Philippines into the Gulf of Siam for hydrographic and oceanographic operations. With few interruptions, she continued surveys and collected data from Nansen casts, core and bottom samplings, and bath thermo-graphic observations in the gulf into late March 1961. She then moved into the Strait of Malacca for further oceanographic work. In early May, she underwent availability in the Philippines; and, at mid-month, she sailed for Hawaii.

On 29 May, Serrano arrived at Pearl Harbor for a four-month stay. Overhaul followed the initial leave period. In early September, the AGS received visitors in connection with the 10th Pacific Science Congress; and, in October, she and Maury again sailed west. During November and December, she conducted oceanographic and hydrographic operations in the Gulf of Siam, the Strait of Malacca, and the Andaman Sea. During the first quarter of 1962, she conducted surveys in the Gulf of Siam; and, in May, she returned to Hawaii.

On 2 October, Serrano again sailed west, with Maury, for another season in the Gulf of Siam and the Andaman Sea areas. Proceeding first to Japan, the ships recorded ocean depths along a prescribed track. From Japan, the AGS's moved south. Typhoon activity delayed Serrano's arrival at Bangkok until 30 October and slowed her initial survey work of the season. Her hydrographic work in the Gulf of Siam was continued into December. In January 1963, she readied her drafting room and laboratory for oceanographic work to be conducted in the Andaman Sea and Bay of Bengal during February and March. In April, she rejoined Maury in the Gulf of Siam and, in May, headed back to Pearl Harbor.

Serrano remained in Hawaiian waters from 10 June to 18 October. She then sailed for another season in the Far East. En route west, she conducted ocean track and bottom reflectivity studies. On 18 November, she arrived in the Philippines; and, for the next four months, she conducted survey operations in the Subic and Manila Bay areas. At the end of March 1964, she headed east again and, after conducting shoal investigations near Midway and Johnston Islands, arrived back at Pearl Harbor on 27 April.

The ACS remained in port until 7 June; then got underway for the west coast where she conducted hydrographic surveys in the approaches to San Diego Harbor, in the Strait of Juan de Fuca, and in the San Francisco Bay Area. In early December, she returned to Pearl Harbor; and, two months later, in February 1965, she departed for the Panama Canal and the northern coast of Colombia.

From 15 March to 2 May, she conducted survey operations off Buena Ventura, Columbia. At mid-month, she left the Panama Canal area, then moved north to Acapulco and Long Beach. In mid-July, she returned to Pearl Harbor.

=== Vietnam service ===
On 19 November, Serrano departed Hawaii on another western Pacific deployment. In mid-December, she arrived at Subic Bay; and, on the 21st, she sailed for the Republic of Vietnam to collect oceanographic data and plant current meter stations in the Cam Ranh Bay area. Most of January 1966 was spent in the Philippines; but, from 30 January to 16 February, she again operated in the Cam Ranh Bay area. She then participated in survey operations at the mouth of the Bassac River; and, at the end of the month, she returned briefly to the Philippines. In March, she participated in surveys in the Con Son Islands and in the Cap Saint Jacques area; then, at the end of the month, she moved north to the Chu Lai area, where she remained until 9 May.

From Vietnam, Serrano proceeded to Subic Bay and Hong Kong, then headed home, arriving at Pearl Harbor on 8 June. She remained in Hawaii for three months and, in mid-September, proceeded to the Puget Sound area where she conducted survey operations until mid-October. At the end of the month, she was back in Hawaii; and, after survey work there, she prepared for another western Pacific deployment.

Serrano sailed west on 1 January 1967. By the end of the month, she was at Vũng Tàu, whence she proceeded north to begin a six-phased Danang-Hue coastal survey. On 23 February, the work was briefly interrupted as her rescue and assistance party successfully fought an engine room fire on the SS Cyrenian.

During March, she operated out of the Song Cua Dai Junk Base where her medical personnel provided care for the residents of the area.

At the end of April, the ship replenished in the Philippines, then resumed work on the Danang-Hue survey which was completed on 18 July. In late August, she completed her last Vietnamese assignment of the season; and, in September, she sailed for home.

Serrano returned to Pearl Harbor on 29 September, having completed 13,401 survey miles. Leave and upkeep took her into late October; and, from then until 10 February 1968, she was in the shipyard for overhaul. On 29 March, she again sailed west with Maury.

From 13 April to 30 May, Serrano surveyed waters near Guam. On 1 June, she continued west toward Vietnam. Three days later, she was diverted to participate in an unsuccessful four-day search for a downed pilot; and, on the 14th, she rejoined Maury in the Mekong Delta.

With only one interruption, a visit to Hong Kong, the ACS conducted survey operations in Vietnamese waters until 18 August. In early September, she investigated shoals in the South China Sea. On the 11th, she got underway for Japan; and, on the 29th, she sailed for Hawaii.

=== Later career ===
Seven months later, Serrano left Pearl Harbor for her last deployment. From mid-May to mid-July 1969, she conducted survey operations in the Sagami Wan and Nojima Saki areas off Honshu. In late July, she moved to Kyushu and, through September, operated in the Amakuse Nada area. In October, she returned to the Sagami Wan-Nojima Saki areas; and, on 2 November, she got underway to return to the United States for inactivation.

Serrano arrived at Pearl Harbor on 15 November. On 2 January 1970, she was decommissioned, and her name was struck from the Navy List. On 2 November 1971, she was sold for scrapping to the Tai-Kian Industry Co., Taiwan.

Serrano was awarded one battle star for her World War II service and six campaign stars for her service off Vietnam.
