= 907 Rhoda =

Main-belt asteroid

Discovery
- Discovered by: M. F. Wolf
- Discovery site: Heidelberg Obs.
- Discovery date: 12 November 1918

Designations
- Pronunciation: /ˈroʊdə/
- Named after: Rhoda Barnard (wife of E. E. Barnard)
- Alternative designations: A918 VA · A901 BA; A913 SC · 1918 EU; 1913 SC · 1901 BA
- Minor planet category: main-belt · (middle) background

Orbital characteristics
- Epoch 31 May 2020 (JD 2459000.5)
- Uncertainty parameter 0
- Observation arc: 118.67 yr (43,343 d)
- Aphelion: 3.2553 AU
- Perihelion: 2.3468 AU
- Semi-major axis: 2.8010 AU
- Eccentricity: 0.1622
- Orbital period (sidereal): 4.69 yr (1,712 d)
- Mean anomaly: 183.55°
- Mean motion: 0° 12^{m} 36.72^{s} / day
- Inclination: 19.525°
- Longitude of ascending node: 42.980°
- Argument of perihelion: 88.326°

Physical characteristics
- Mean diameter: 62.73±1.7 km; 63±1 km; 75.22±0.83 km; 82.660±0.340 km
- Synodic rotation period: 22.44±0.02 h (Note: Lightcurve plot of (907) Rhoda, Palmer Divide Observatory, B. D. Warner (2004). Rotation period 22.44±0.02 hours with a brightness amplitude of 0.16±0.02 mag. Quality code is 3. Summary figures at the LCDB.)
- Geometric albedo: 0.032±0.005; 0.040±0.001; 0.0560±0.003
- Spectral type: Tholen = C; SMASS = Xk; C0 (Barucci); B–V = 0.709±0.020; U–B = 0.269±0.029
- Absolute magnitude (H): 9.7

907 Rhoda is a large background asteroid from the central region of the asteroid belt, that measures approximately 75 kilometers (47 miles) in diameter. It was discovered on 12 November 1918, by astronomer Max Wolf at the Heidelberg Observatory in southwest Germany. The dark C/X-type asteroid has a long rotation period of 22.4 hours and is likely spherical in shape. It was named after Rhoda Barnard, wife of American astronomer Edward Emerson Barnard (1857–1923).

== Orbit and classification ==
Rhoda is a non-family asteroid of the main belt's background population when applying the hierarchical clustering method to its proper orbital elements. It orbits the Sun in the central asteroid belt at a distance of 2.3–3.3 AU once every 4 years and 8 months (1,712 days; semi-major axis of 2.8 AU). Its orbit has an eccentricity of 0.16 and an inclination of 20° with respect to the ecliptic. The body's observation arc begins with its first observation as A901 BA (1901 BA) at the Heidelberg-Königstuhl State Observatory on 18 January 1901, where it was officially discovered almost 18 years later on 12 November 1918.

== Naming ==
This minor planet was named after Rhoda Barnard (née Calvert), wife of the American astronomer Edward Emerson Barnard (1857–1923), who was himself honored with the asteroid 819 Barnardiana. The official naming was published in the journal Astronomische Nachrichten in 1922 (AN 215, 471). The naming was also mentioned in The Names of the Minor Planets by Paul Herget in 1955 (H 88).

== Physical characteristics ==
In the Tholen classification, Rhoda is a common, carbonaceous C-type asteroid, while in the Bus–Binzel SMASS classification it is a Xk-subtype, which transitions from the X-type to the uncommon K-type asteroids. In the Barucci-taxonomy, which classified a total of 438 asteroids in 1987, Rhoda is a C0-type.

=== Rotation period ===
In April 2004, a rotational lightcurve of Rhoda was obtained from photometric observations by Brian Warner at the Palmer Divide Observatory (716) in Colorado. Lightcurve analysis gave a rotation period of 22.44±0.02 hours with a low brightness variation of 0.16±0.02 magnitude, indicative of a non-elongated, spherical shape (U=3−). Other period determinations were made by Marciniak as well as by Raphaël Nicollerat and Raoul Behrend, giving a low-amplitude lightcurve with a period of 22.46±0.01 and 22.4±0.5 hours, respectively (U=2/1).

=== Diameter and albedo ===
According to the survey carried out by the Infrared Astronomical Satellite IRAS, the Japanese Akari satellite, and the NEOWISE mission of NASA's Wide-field Infrared Survey Explorer (WISE), Rhoda measures (62.73±1.7), (75.22±0.83) and (82.660±0.340) kilometers in diameter and its surface has an albedo of (0.0560±0.003), (0.040±0.001) and (0.032±0.005), respectively. The Collaborative Asteroid Lightcurve Link adopts the results obtained by IRAS, that is, an albedo of 0.0560 and calculates a diameter of 62.73 kilometers based on an absolute magnitude of 10.74. Alternative mean-diameter measurements published by the WISE team include in ascending order (67.246±26.594 km), (84.062±30.075 km), (91.045±2.093 km) and (95.22±22.26 km) and albedos of (0.0266±0.0058), (0.03±0.02), (0.031±0.015) and (0.044±0.035). An asteroid occultation, observed on 23 March 2009, gave a best-fit ellipse dimension of 63.0 × 63.0 kilometers. These timed observations are taken when the asteroid passes in front of a distant star.
