= 1514 Ricouxa =

Asteroid of the inner regions of the asteroid belt

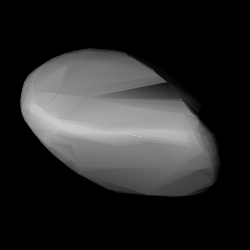
- Shape model of Ricouxa from its lightcurve

Discovery
- Discovered by: M. F. Wolf
- Discovery site: Heidelberg Obs.
- Discovery date: 22 August 1906

Designations
- Named after: unknown (named by A. Patry)
- Alternative designations: 1906 UR · 1936 ME; 1939 HC · 1940 XA; 1970 XA · A916 OC
- Minor planet category: main-belt · Flora

Orbital characteristics
- Epoch 4 September 2017 (JD 2458000.5)
- Uncertainty parameter 0
- Observation arc: 110.06 yr (40,198 days)
- Aphelion: 2.6876 AU
- Perihelion: 1.7937 AU
- Semi-major axis: 2.2407 AU
- Eccentricity: 0.1995
- Orbital period (sidereal): 3.35 yr (1,225 days)
- Mean anomaly: 41.914°
- Mean motion: 0° 17^{m} 38.04^{s} / day
- Inclination: 4.5349°
- Longitude of ascending node: 145.85°
- Argument of perihelion: 179.38°

Physical characteristics
- Dimensions: 6.66±0.27 km 7.07 km (derived); 7.784±0.062 km 8.129±0.021 km
- Synodic rotation period: 10.033±0.002 h 10.42466 h 10.42468±0.00005 h 10.438 h
- Geometric albedo: 0.1821±0.0397; 0.228±0.039; 0.24 (assumed); 0.363±0.046
- Spectral type: S
- Absolute magnitude (H): 12.60 · 12.79±0.17 · 12.8 · 12.92

1514 Ricouxa (provisional designation 1906 UR) is a stony Florian asteroid from the inner regions of the asteroid belt, approximately 7.5 kilometers in diameter. It was discovered on 22 August 1906, by German astronomer Max Wolf at Heidelberg Observatory in southern Germany. The origin of the asteroid's name is unknown.

== Classification and orbit ==
Ricouxa is a S-type asteroid and member of the Flora family, one of the largest collisional populations of stony asteroids in the entire main-belt. It orbits the Sun at a distance of 1.8–2.7 AU once every 3 years and 4 months (1,225 days). Its orbit has an eccentricity of 0.20 and an inclination of 5° with respect to the ecliptic. Ricouxa's observation arc begins with its official discovery observation in 1906, as no precoveries were taken, and no prior identifications were made.

== Physical characteristics ==
=== Rotation and poles ===
In the 1990s, Italian astronomer Maria A. Barucci obtained a rotational lightcurve of Ricouxa, using the ESO 1-metre telescope at La Silla Observatory in Chile. Lightcurve analysis gave a well-defined rotation period of 10.438 hours with a brightness variation of 0.62 magnitude (U=3).

Photometric observations by French amateur astronomer Pierre Antonini in April 2006, gave a similar period of 10.033 hours and an identical amplitude of 0.62 magnitude (U=2+). Additional periods were derived on modeled light-curves from various data sources. They gave a period of 10.42466 and 10.42468 hours, as well as a spin axis of (0°, 71.0°) and (251.0°, 75.0°) in ecliptic coordinates, respectively.

=== Diameter and albedo ===
According to the survey carried out by NASA's Wide-field Infrared Survey Explorer with its subsequent NEOWISE mission, Ricouxa measures 7.78 kilometers in diameter, and its surface has an albedo of 0.228 (revised albedo-fits per 2014), while the Collaborative Asteroid Lightcurve Link assumes an albedo of 0.24 – taken from 8 Flora, the family's principal body and namesake – and derives a diameter of 7.07 kilometers based on an absolute magnitude of 12.92.

== Naming ==
This minor planet was named by French astronomer André Patry (1902–1960), after whom the asteroid 1601 Patry is named. However, any reference to a person or occurrence for the name "Ricouxa" remains unknown. The asteroid's name was also published in The Names of the Minor Planets by Paul Herget in 1955 (H 135).

=== Unknown meaning ===
Among the many thousands of named minor planets, Ricouxa is one of 120 asteroids, for which no official naming citation has been published. All of these low-numbered asteroids have numbers between 164 Eva and 1514 Ricouxa and were discovered between 1876 and the 1930s, predominantly by astronomers Auguste Charlois, Johann Palisa, Max Wolf and Karl Reinmuth.
