= 3752 Camillo =

Inclined contact-binary asteroid

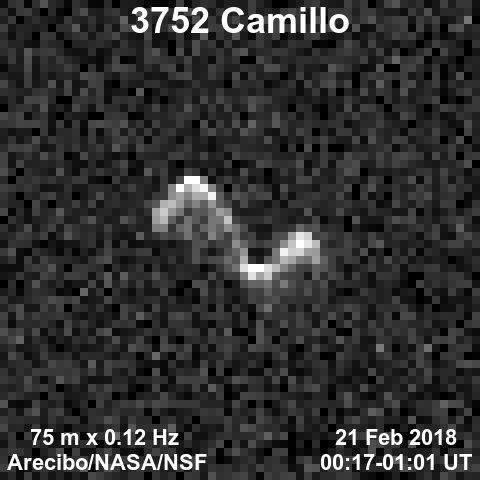
- Radar image of Camillo taken by the Arecibo Observatory on 21 February 2018, revealing its angular bilobate shape

Discovery
- Discovered by: E. F. Helin; M. Barucci
- Discovery site: CERGA Obs.
- Discovery date: 15 August 1985

Designations
- Pronunciation: /kəˈmɪloʊ/
- Named after: Camillo (son of King Turno and son of discoverer)
- Alternative designations: 1985 PA
- Minor planet category: NEO · Apollo

Orbital characteristics
- Epoch 23 March 2018 (JD 2458200.5)
- Uncertainty parameter 0
- Observation arc: 42.26 yr (15,436 d)
- Aphelion: 1.8400 AU
- Perihelion: 0.9871 AU
- Semi-major axis: 1.4135 AU
- Eccentricity: 0.3017
- Orbital period (sidereal): 1.68 yr (614 d)
- Mean anomaly: 41.249°
- Mean motion: 0° 35^{m} 11.4^{s} / day
- Inclination: 55.555°
- Longitude of ascending node: 147.98°
- Argument of perihelion: 312.22°
- Earth MOID: 0.0780 AU (30.3871 LD)

Physical characteristics
- Mean diameter: 2.3 km (approx.); 2.306±0.088 km 2.328 km 2.33 km (taken)
- Synodic rotation period: 37.846 h 37.881±0.005 h
- Geometric albedo: 0.210±0.036; 0.22; 0.2234
- Spectral type: S (assumed)
- Absolute magnitude (H): 15.3 · 15.41 · 15.41±0.13 · 15.5

3752 Camillo is an inclined contact-binary asteroid, classified as a near-Earth object of the Apollo group, approximately 2.3 kilometers (1.4 miles) in diameter. It was discovered on 15 August 1985, by astronomers Eleanor Helin and Maria Barucci using a 0.9-metre (35 in) telescope at the CERGA Observatory in Caussols, France. Lightcurve studies by Petr Pravec in 1998 suggest that the assumed S-type asteroid has an elongated shape and a longer-than average rotation period of 38 hours.

== Orbit ==
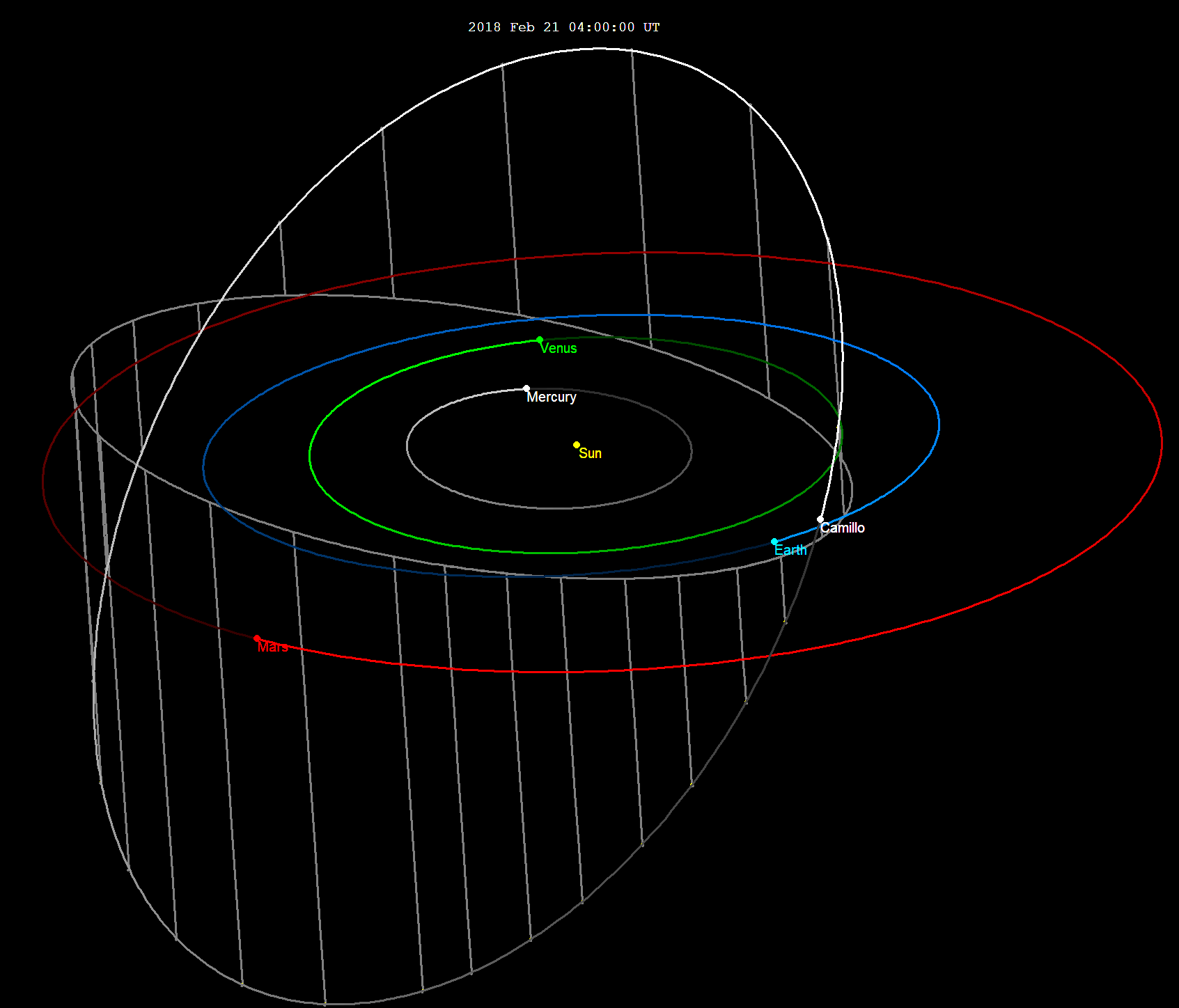
The orbit of Camillo is highly inclined. Vertical lines show the distance above and below the ecliptic every 30 days.

Camillo orbits the Sun at a distance of 0.99–1.8 AU once every 20 months (614 days; semi-major axis of 1.41 AU). Its orbit has an eccentricity of 0.30 and an inclination of 56° with respect to the ecliptic.

=== Close approaches ===
The closest point between the orbit of the Earth and the orbit of this asteroid (Earth MOID) is currently 0.0780 AU (11,670,000 km; 7,250,000 mi) or 30 lunar distances, so Camillo does not come close enough to Earth to qualify as a potentially hazardous asteroid. It came to perihelion (its closest approach to the Sun) on 6 January 1976 and, on 17 February 1976 and passed within 0.08013 AU (11,987,000 km; 7,449,000 mi) of Earth.

==== 2013 passage ====
Camillo came to perihelion on 27 December 2012. On 12 February 2013 the asteroid passed 0.14775 AU (22,103,000 km; 13,734,000 mi) from Earth and had an apparent magnitude of 13. During the 2013 passage the asteroid was studied by radar using Goldstone and Arecibo.

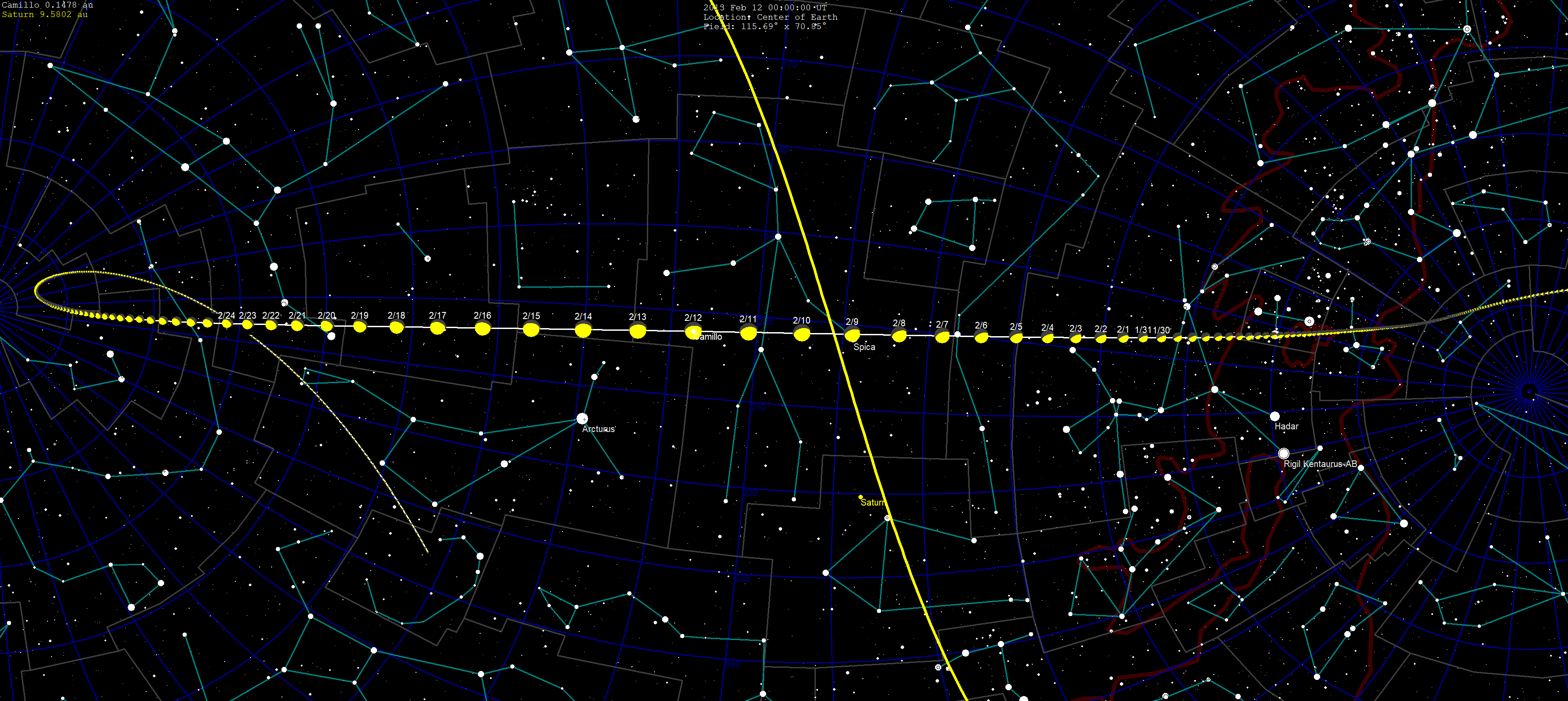
Camillo's south to north daily motion in the sky as seen from the earth

==== 2018 passage ====
On February 20, 2018, the asteroid passed by Earth. It was observed on radar by Arecibo Observatory and shown to have a long angular double-lobed shape. At 0.13 AU (19,000,000 km; 12,000,000 mi) distance its peak magnitude was about 13.

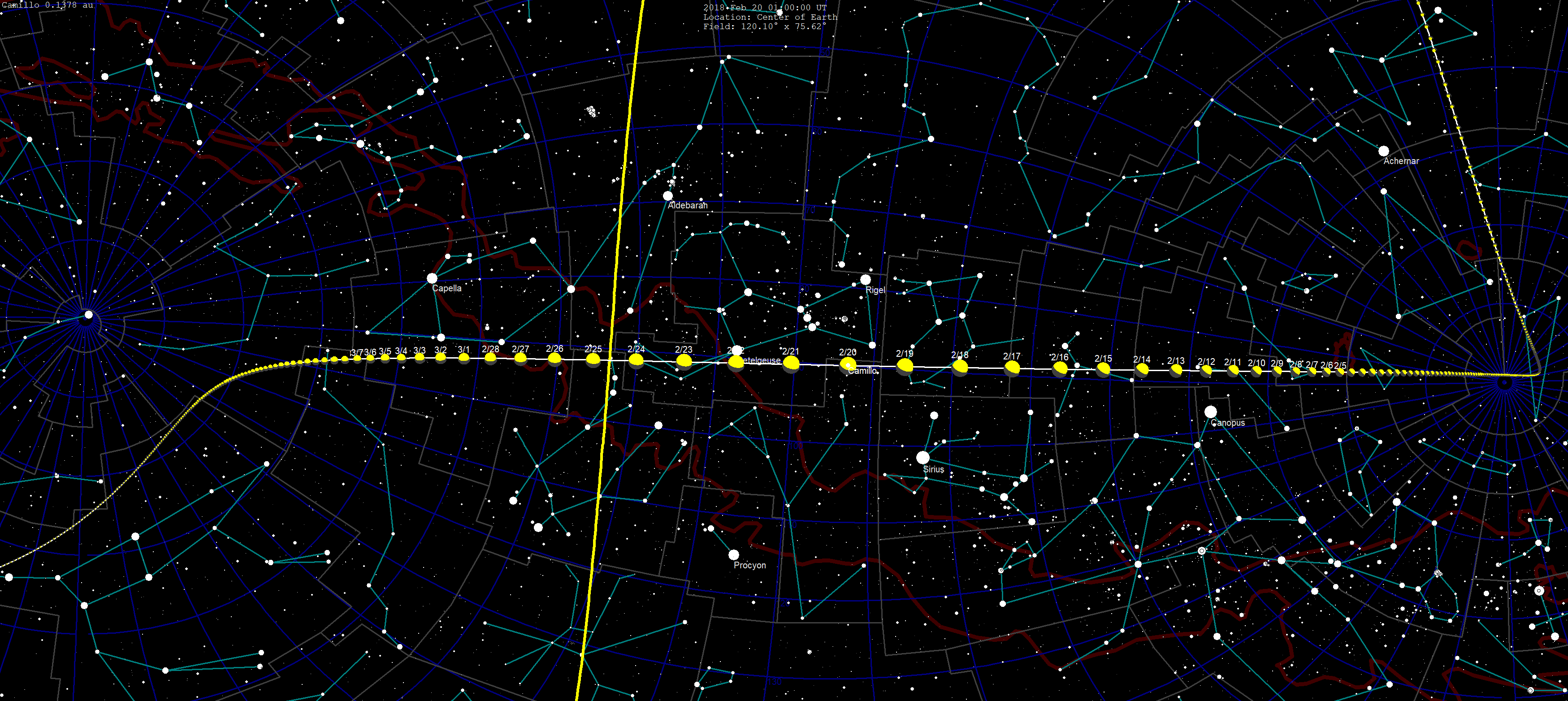
Camillo's south to north daily motion in the sky as seen from the earth

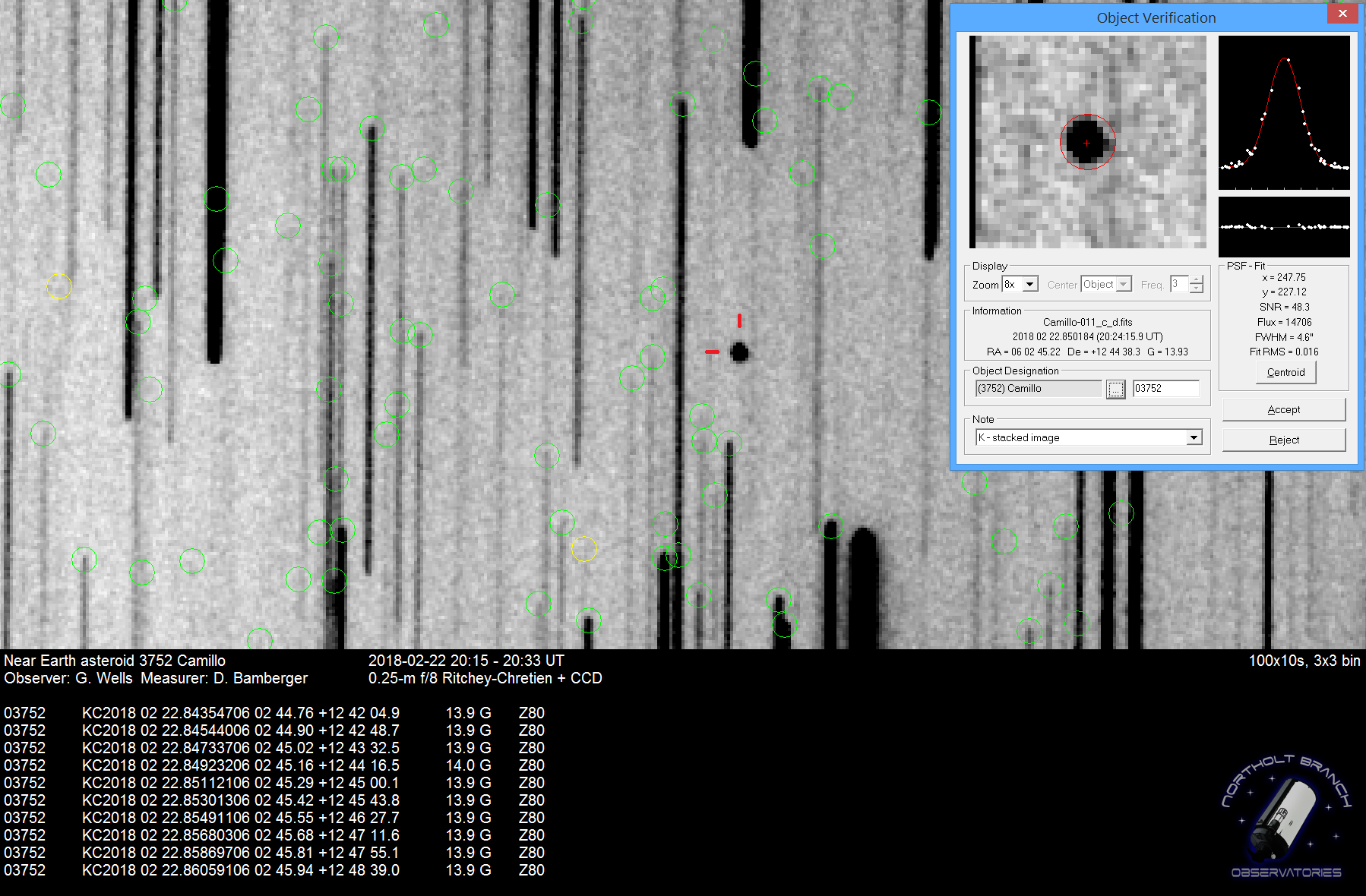
Left: A 25 minute timelapse sequence of 3752 Camillo taken from Northolt Branch Observatories (London, UK) on 22 February 2018, two days after closest approach. The asteroid can be seen at apparent magnitude +14, moving upwards through the image. Brightness is inverted (stars appear dark, the sky background appears light). Camillo was about 21.9 million km (13.6 million mi) from Earth at that time. Right: Camillo as seen from Northolt Branch Observatories on 22 February 2018. The image is corrected for the asteroid's motion, so stars appear trailed.

== Naming ==
This minor planet was named for the son of the early Roman King Turno. "Camillo" is also the name of the discoverer's son. The official naming citation was published by the Minor Planet Center on 20 May 1989 (M.P.C. 14633).
