= (15692) 1984 RA =

Hungaria asteroid

Discovery
- Discovered by: M. Barucci
- Discovery site: Palomar Obs.
- Discovery date: 1 September 1984

Designations
- Alternative designations: 1986 JT_{1} · 1992 SZ_{26}
- Minor planet category: main-belt · (inner); Hungaria

Orbital characteristics
- Epoch 23 March 2018 (JD 2458200.5)
- Uncertainty parameter 0
- Observation arc: 41.44 yr (15,135 d)
- Aphelion: 2.1225 AU
- Perihelion: 1.7302 AU
- Semi-major axis: 1.9264 AU
- Eccentricity: 0.1018
- Orbital period (sidereal): 2.67 yr (977 d)
- Mean anomaly: 138.59°
- Mean motion: 0° 22^{m} 6.96^{s} / day
- Inclination: 23.217°
- Longitude of ascending node: 142.60°
- Argument of perihelion: 273.05°

Physical characteristics
- Mean diameter: 1.728±0.273 km 2.43 km (calculated)
- Synodic rotation period: 37.44±0.05 h (Note: Lightcure plot of (15692) 1984 RA, by B. D. Warner at the Center for Solar System Studies – Palmer Divide Station (U82). Rotation period 37.44±0.05 hours. Observation from 8 Jul 2013 to 1 Aug 2013. Data points: 273. Quality code is 2. Summary figures at the LCDB)
- Geometric albedo: 0.30 (assumed); 0.780±0.146
- Spectral type: E (assumed)
- Absolute magnitude (H): 14.7; 14.85±0.97; 14.9; 15.0

(15692) 1984 RA is a Hungaria asteroid from the innermost regions of the asteroid belt, approximately 2 kilometers (1.2 miles) in diameter. It was discovered on 1 September 1984, by Italian astronomer Maria Barucci at the Palomar Observatory in California, United States. The presumed E-type asteroid has a longer-than average rotation period of 37.4 hours and possibly an elongated shape.

== Orbit and classification ==
1984 RA is a bright core member of the Hungaria family (003), a large family of three thousand asteroids located within the dynamical group with the same name. Hungarias form the innermost dense concentration of asteroids in the Solar System; they are inside the asteroid belt's core region, sometimes considered a completely independent population.

The asteroid orbits the Sun in the innermost asteroid belt at a distance of 1.7–2.1 AU once every 2 years and 8 months (977 days; semi-major axis of 1.93 AU). Its orbit has an eccentricity of 0.10 and an inclination of 23° with respect to the ecliptic. The body's observation arc begins with a precovery found in the Digitized Sky Survey and taken at the Siding Spring Observatory in November 1977, almost 7 years prior to its official discovery observation at Palomar.

== Physical characteristics ==
1984 RA is an assumed E-type asteroid, known for their high albedos, typically around 0.4.

=== Rotation period ===
In July 2013, a rotational lightcurve of this asteroid was obtained from photometric observations by American astronomer Brian Warner at the Palmer Divide Station (U82) in California. Lightcurve analysis gave a long rotation period of 37.44 hours with a brightness amplitude of 0.66 magnitude, indicative of an elongated shape (U=2). While not being a slow rotator, 1984 RA has a significantly longer period than most asteroids, which rotate once every 2 to 20 hours around their axis.

=== Diameter and albedo ===
According to the survey carried out by the NEOWISE mission of NASA's Wide-field Infrared Survey Explorer, this asteroid measures 1.728 kilometers in diameter and its surface has an exceptionally high albedo of 0.78. The Collaborative Asteroid Lightcurve Link assumes an albedo of 0.30 – a compromise value between the E- (0.40) and S-type (0.20) members of the Hungaria family and group, respectively – and calculates a diameter of 2.43 kilometers based on an absolute magnitude of 15.0.

== Numbering and naming ==
This minor planet was numbered by the Minor Planet Center on 26 July 2000 (M.P.C. 40991). As of 2018, it has not been named.
