= 3908 Nyx =

Amor and Mars-crosser asteroid

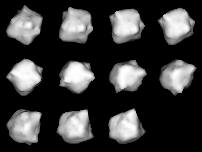

Discovery
- Discovered by: Hans-Emil Schuster
- Discovery date: 6 August 1980

Designations
- Pronunciation: /ˈnɪks/"Nyx". Dictionary.com Unabridged (Online). n.d.
- Named after: Nyx
- Alternative designations: 1980 PA; 1988 XB_{1}
- Minor planet category: Amor; Mars-crosser
- Adjectives: Nyctian

Orbital characteristics
- Epoch 27 July 2005 (JD 2453578.5)
- Uncertainty parameter 0
- Observation arc: 13021 days (35.65 yr)
- Aphelion: 2.81198 AU (420.666 Gm)
- Perihelion: 1.04239 AU (155.939 Gm)
- Semi-major axis: 1.92719 AU (288.304 Gm)
- Eccentricity: 0.45911
- Orbital period (sidereal): 2.68 yr (977.20 d)
- Mean anomaly: 99.7699°
- Mean motion: 0° 22^{m} 6.236^{s} / day
- Inclination: 2.17667°
- Longitude of ascending node: 261.688°
- Argument of perihelion: 125.978°
- Earth MOID: 0.0563399 AU (8.42833 Gm)

Physical characteristics
- Mean radius: 0.5 ± 0.075 km
- Synodic rotation period: 4.42601 h (0.184417 d)
- Geometric albedo: 0.23
- Spectral type: V
- Absolute magnitude (H): 17.3

3908 Nyx is an Amor and Mars-crosser asteroid. It was discovered by Hans-Emil Schuster on August 6, 1980, and is named after Nyx, the Greek goddess of the night, after which Pluto's moon Nix is also named. It is 1–2 km (0.62–1.24 mi) in diameter and is a V-type asteroid, meaning that it may be a fragment of the asteroid 4 Vesta.

== Observations ==
In 2000, radar observations conducted at the Arecibo and Goldstone observatories produced a model of Nyx's shape; the asteroid can best be described as spherical but with many protruding lumps.

== Name ==
To avoid confusion with 3908 Nyx, Pluto's moon Nix was changed from the initial proposal of the classical spelling Nyx, to Nix.

== See also ==
- 3551 Verenia
- 4 Vesta
- 4055 Magellan
- HED meteorite
- V-type asteroid
