= 1214 Richilde =

Main-belt asteroid

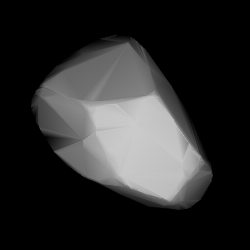
- Shape model of Richilde from its lightcurve

Discovery
- Discovered by: M. F. Wolf
- Discovery site: Heidelberg Obs.
- Discovery date: 1 January 1932

Designations
- Named after: unknown
- Alternative designations: 1932 AA · 1930 QD; 1961 PC
- Minor planet category: main-belt · (middle) background

Orbital characteristics
- Epoch 4 September 2017 (JD 2458000.5)
- Uncertainty parameter 0
- Observation arc: 86.52 yr (31,602 days)
- Aphelion: 3.0319 AU
- Perihelion: 2.3881 AU
- Semi-major axis: 2.7100 AU
- Eccentricity: 0.1188
- Orbital period (sidereal): 4.46 yr (1,629 days)
- Mean anomaly: 207.11°
- Mean motion: 0° 13^{m} 15.24^{s} / day
- Inclination: 9.8345°
- Longitude of ascending node: 285.92°
- Argument of perihelion: 32.580°

Physical characteristics
- Dimensions: 30.70±12.73 km 33.26±8.39 km 33.651±8.835 km 34.134±0.253 km 34.94±0.50 km 35.22 km (derived); 35.29±3.2 km 36.668±0.575 km 39.58±11.00 km
- Synodic rotation period: 9.860 h 9.86687±0.00005 h 9.870±0.001 h
- Geometric albedo: 0.044±0.051; 0.048±0.015; 0.0517 (derived); 0.0518±0.0853; 0.0550±0.0055; 0.06±0.02; 0.0619±0.013; 0.064±0.002; 0.07±0.04
- Spectral type: SMASS = Xk · P
- Absolute magnitude (H): 10.90 · 11.03 · 11.09 · 11.09±0.40 · 11.10 · 11.20

1214 Richilde, provisional designation 1932 AA, is a dark background asteroid from the central regions of the asteroid belt, approximately 35 kilometers in diameter. It was discovered by Max Wolf at Heidelberg Observatory in 1932. Any reference of the asteroid's name to a person is unknown.

== Discovery ==
Richilde was discovered on 1 January 1932, by German astronomer Max Wolf at the Heidelberg-Königstuhl State Observatory in southwest Germany. Five nights later, on 6 January 1932, it was independently discovered by Japanese astronomer K. Nakamura at Kwasan Observatory (377), Kyoto. The Minor Planet Center only recognizes the first discoverer. The body's observation arc begins with its first observation as 1930 QD at Uccle Observatory in August 1930, approximately 16 months prior to its official discovery observation at Heidelberg.

== Orbit and classification ==
Richilde is a non-family asteroid from the main-belt's background population. It orbits the Sun in the central asteroid belt at a distance of 2.4–3.0 AU once every 4 years and 6 months (1,629 days; semi-major axis of 2.71 AU). Its orbit has an eccentricity of 0.12 and an inclination of 10° with respect to the ecliptic.

== Physical characteristics ==
In the SMASS, Richilde is a Xk-subtype, that transitions from the X-type to the rare K-type asteroids, while the Wide-field Infrared Survey Explorer (WISE) characterizes the body as a primitive P-type asteroid.

=== Rotation period and pole ===
In the 1990s, a rotational lightcurve of Richilde was first obtained from photometric observations by astronomers using the ESO 1-metre telescope at the La Silla Observatory in Chile. Lightcurve analysis gave a well-defined rotation period of 9.860 hours with a brightness variation of 0.32 magnitude (U=3). In October 2006, a concurring period of 9.870 hours and an amplitude of 0.31 was measured by French amateur astronomer Raymond Poncy (U=3-).

In 2011, a modeled lightcurve using data from the Uppsala Asteroid Photometric Catalogue (UAPC) and other sources gave a period 9.86687 hours, as well as a partial spin axis of (n.a.°, –59.0°) in ecliptic coordinates (λ, β).

=== Diameter and albedo ===
According to the surveys carried out by the Infrared Astronomical Satellite IRAS, the Japanese Akari satellite and the NEOWISE mission of NASA's WISE telescope, Richilde measures between 30.70 and 39.58 kilometers in diameter and its surface has an albedo between 0.044 and 0.07.

The Collaborative Asteroid Lightcurve Link derives an albedo of 0.0517 and a diameter of 35.22 kilometers based on an absolute magnitude of 11.10.

== Naming ==
This minor planet is named after a common German female name. Any reference of this name to a person or occurrence is unknown (AN 247, 153).

=== Unknown meaning ===
Among the many thousands of named minor planets, Richilde is one of 120 asteroids, for which no official naming citation has been published. All of these asteroids have low numbers between 164 Eva and 1514 Ricouxa and were discovered between 1876 and the 1930s, predominantly by astronomers Auguste Charlois, Johann Palisa, Max Wolf and Karl Reinmuth.
