= Maria A. Barucci =

Italian astronomer and planetary scientist

Maria Antonietta Barucci
- Maria Antonietta Barucci
- Other name: Antonella Barucci
- Citizenship: Italian, French
- Education: Sapienza University of Rome (doctorate)
- Known for: G-mode asteroid taxonomy; asteroid characterisation; study of trans-Neptunian objects; Marco Polo and MarcoPolo-R sample-return proposals; principal investigator of MIRS on MMX
- Awards: NASA Silver Achievement Medal (2017); Medal of the Universe Sciences section, Académie des sciences (2023)
- Scientific career
- Fields: Planetary science, small Solar System bodies, space exploration
- Workplaces: Paris Observatory

Maria Antonietta Barucci, known as Antonella Barucci, is an Italian and French senior planetary scientist and astronomer of the exceptional class (astronome de classe exceptionnelle) at the LIRA laboratory of the Paris Observatory. Expert in small Solar System bodies, she studies the Solar System from the ground and from space, investigating the physical, chemical and mineralogical nature of primitive small bodies such as asteroids, comets, satellites and trans-Neptunian objects to understand the origin and evolution of the Solar System and of its protoplanetary disk, including accretion processes and the origin of water and of life.

Barucci has worked on planetary missions of ESA, NASA and JAXA, including Cassini–Huygens, Rosetta, Hayabusa2 and OSIRIS-REx. She led the Marco Polo and MarcoPolo-R asteroid sample-return proposals to ESA, and is principal investigator of the MIRS infrared spectrometer on JAXA's Martian Moons eXploration (MMX) mission. She was president of Division F (Planetary Systems and Astrobiology) of the International Astronomical Union from 2021 to 2024.

== Education ==
Barucci received a doctorate in mathematics, specialising in astronomy, from the Sapienza University of Rome. In 1993 she received the habilitation à diriger des recherches (habilitation to supervise research) in astrophysics from the University of Paris VII–Denis Diderot.

== Career ==
In 1984 and 1985 she spent part of her time at the Jet Propulsion Laboratory and took part in asteroid observations at Palomar Observatory in California, where she co-discovered minor planets including the near-Earth asteroid 3362 Khufu.

She is an astronomer of the exceptional class (astronome de classe exceptionnelle) at the Paris Observatory – PSL. She worked at the Laboratory for Space Studies and Instrumentation in Astrophysics (LESIA), which merged with two other laboratories on 1 January 2025 to form the Laboratory for Instrumentation and Research in Astrophysics (LIRA).

Since 1994 she has supervised or co-supervised 24 doctoral theses at French and international institutions. Topics include the physical properties and composition of asteroids, trans-Neptunian objects, comet 67P/Churyumov–Gerasimenko, Bennu and Ryugu, and the moons of Mars.

== Research ==
=== Asteroids ===
In 1987 Barucci and colleagues classified 438 asteroids into nine taxonomic classes. They applied the G-mode multivariate statistical method to the asteroids' eight-colour photometry and IRAS albedos.

She reconstructed asteroid shape models using laboratory experiments and lightcurve analysis, and modelled the shape of the asteroid 951 Gaspra from ground-based observations for comparison with the first image returned by the Galileo spacecraft.

Much of her later asteroid work concerned the spectroscopic investigation of primitive, carbon-rich asteroids. In 1998 she led a spectroscopic search for signs of aqueous alteration, meaning minerals altered by liquid water, on the surfaces of primitive asteroids. Using the Infrared Space Observatory (ISO) space telescope, she and colleagues reported infrared observations of the asteroid 10 Hygiea, interpreting its surface composition as that of a primitive body. She later studied spectral alteration induced by heavy-ion irradiation to simulate space weathering effects on near-Earth asteroids, and continued to investigate space weathering of primitive bodies using ion irradiation of carbonaceous chondrite meteorites to simulate the effect of the solar wind.

=== Trans-Neptunian objects ===
The citation for her 2023 Académie des sciences medal describes her as a pioneer in the physical and chemical study of trans-Neptunian objects. Following the first discoveries of trans-Neptunian objects, she began observing centaurs and trans-Neptunian objects with large ground-based telescopes. She and colleagues observed 90377 Sedna, one of the most distant known scattered trans-Neptunian objects, reporting tentative signatures of nitrogen and methane ices on its surface. In 2005 she and colleagues proposed a taxonomy of trans-Neptunian objects and centaurs based on their colours. It sorts them into four groups (BB, BR, IR and RR), ranging from neutral to very red surfaces.

She led two Large Programmes on these objects at the European Southern Observatory (ESO). The second (2007–2008), of which she was principal investigator, used three of the four 8.2-metre telescopes of the Very Large Telescope almost simultaneously. They obtained visible and near-infrared spectra of the same objects. The programmes examined the surfaces of celestial bodies, searching for ices such as water, methane and methanol. On the trans-Neptunian object 90482 Orcus, she and colleagues detected crystalline water ice and possibly ammonia. They took this as evidence that the surface had been renewed.

She was lead editor of The Solar System Beyond Neptune (2008), a volume in the University of Arizona Press Space Science Series that won a PROSE Award. She also co-edited The Trans-Neptunian Solar System (2019) and wrote the chapter on trans-Neptunian objects in The Pluto System After New Horizons.

=== Minor planet discoveries ===
The Minor Planet Center credits her with three minor planets discovered in 1984 and 1985. They are the Aten asteroid 3362 Khufu, found with R. Scott Dunbar; the Apollo asteroid 3752 Camillo, found with Eleanor F. Helin; and (15692) 1984 RA.

Minor planets discovered: 3
3362 Khufu	30 August 1984	list
3752 Camillo	15 August 1985	list
(15692) 1984 RA	1 September 1984	list

Barucci has written more than 1,000 scientific publications, with more than 26,000 citations, over 430 of which are in peer-reviewed journals. She has also written several books and contributed to encyclopaedias. Her h-index was 82 in 2026.

== Space missions ==
Barucci has been involved in the scientific definition, instrumentation and data analysis of several planetary space missions.

=== Rosetta ===
Barucci was a member of the ESA Science Definition Team for the Rosetta comet rendezvous mission, a planetary cornerstone mission in ESA's Horizon 2000 programme, and co-authored the 1993 ESA report that defined the mission. She was a member of the VIRTIS spectrometer and OSIRIS camera teams. Rosetta's launch slipped in 2003 and the mission was given a new trajectory. Barucci then led the study that characterised candidate flyby asteroids and recommended 2867 Šteins and 21 Lutetia. She and colleagues also observed both targets with the Spitzer Space Telescope to study their surface composition before the flybys. The spacecraft flew past them in 2008 and 2010. Using OSIRIS and VIRTIS data, she and colleagues characterised the surface of comet 67P/Churyumov–Gerasimenko, identifying sparsely exposed patches of water ice on the nucleus.

=== Cassini–Huygens ===
On the Cassini–Huygens mission to Saturn, Barucci was an international co-investigator of the Composite Infrared Spectrometer (CIRS) on the Cassini orbiter. She also contributed to the Huygens Atmospheric Structure Instrument (HASI), which measured the physical properties of Titan's atmosphere during the probe's descent.

=== SMART-1 and Dawn ===
She was a member of the team of AMIE, the miniature camera on SMART-1, ESA's first mission to the Moon, which tested solar electric propulsion. Paris Observatory also credits her with work on NASA's Dawn mission to Vesta and Ceres.

=== Marco Polo and MarcoPolo-R ===
Barucci was lead proposer of Marco Polo, a joint European–Japanese mission to return a sample from a primitive near-Earth asteroid. ESA selected it in 2007 for an assessment study in its Cosmic Vision programme. According to ESA's 2009 assessment report, the proposal was "produced under the leadership of Antonella Barucci", with about 450 scientists supporting it.

She was then lead proposer of the successor concept, MarcoPolo-R. During ESA's assessment study she led the mission's Science Study Team and was the proposed principal investigator of its infrared spectrometer, MaRIS. MarcoPolo-R was shortlisted for ESA's M3 launch opportunity in February 2011, but ESA chose PLATO in February 2014.

=== Hayabusa2 and OSIRIS-REx ===
Barucci is a co-investigator on JAXA's Hayabusa2 and NASA's OSIRIS-REx sample-return missions. On Hayabusa2 she was a co-investigator on the optical navigation cameras and the NIRS3 near-infrared spectrometer. She and her team studied the surface composition of 162173 Ryugu, focusing on organic material and hydrated minerals. She continues as a co-investigator for the same instruments and as an interdisciplinary scientist on the Hayabusa2 extended mission, which flew past the asteroid 98943 Torifune in July 2026 and is planned to visit another small asteroid.

For OSIRIS-REx she contributed to the astronomical characterisation of the target asteroid 101955 Bennu, for which she received a NASA Silver Achievement Medal in 2017. She and colleagues also estimated the hydrogen content of Bennu's surface and mapped how it varies, using hydrogen as a tracer of hydrated minerals.

=== BepiColombo ===
She is a co-investigator on the ESA–JAXA mission BepiColombo to Mercury. She is a member of the team of SIMBIO-SYS, an instrument suite on the Mercury Planetary Orbiter. It combines a high-resolution camera, a stereo camera and a visible and near-infrared imaging spectrometer to study the geology, volcanism, tectonics, surface age and composition of Mercury.

As of October 2026, BepiColombo was due to enter orbit around Mercury on 21 November 2026, and science operations were to begin in April 2027. SIMBIO-SYS took its first image in space on 6 October 2026.

=== MMX ===
MIRS team with the instrument container before shipment to JAXA (March 2024)

Barucci is the principal investigator of MIRS (MMX InfraRed Spectrometer), an imaging spectrometer on JAXA's Martian Moons eXploration mission. MIRS covers wavelengths from 0.9 to 3.6 μm. It is designed to map the composition of Phobos and Deimos, help in the selection of landing sites for sample collection, and observe the Martian atmosphere.

LESIA built the instrument with CNES and five other French laboratories: the Bordeaux Astrophysics Laboratory (LAB), LATMOS, the Observatoire Midi-Pyrénées, the Marseille Astrophysics Laboratory (LAM) and IRAP. It was delivered to JAXA on 5 April 2024 and integrated on the spacecraft. MIRS passed its health tests at Mitsubishi Electric (MELCO) and at Tanegashima.

MMX was launched on 20 October 2026 aboard an H3 rocket from Tanegashima Space Center. The plan is to reach Mars about a year after launch, orbit Phobos for three years, collect a sample from its surface and return it to Earth in 2031. JAXA describes this as the first mission to return material from the Martian system.

== Planetary defence ==
Barucci was part of NEOShield and NEOShield-2, asteroid-impact mitigation projects funded respectively by the European Union's Seventh Framework Programme and Horizon 2020 that studied techniques to deflect an asteroid. She then worked on their Horizon 2020 successor NEOROCKS. This project measured the physical properties of near-Earth objects.

In 2012 she studied, with colleagues including CNES staff, a proposal to probe the interior of the asteroid 99942 Apophis during its close approach to Earth in 2029. CNES was then studying affordable scenarios for such a mission.

Since 2025 she has been a member of the team of NEOPOPS (NEO Physical Observations and Properties Simulation). The project is funded by the EU's Horizon Europe programme and implemented by ESA for 2025–2028. It succeeds NEOShield, NEOShield-2 and NEOROCKS, and makes follow-up observations of near-Earth objects, giving priority to potentially hazardous ones. The team took part in rapid-response observing campaigns on potential impactors, including 2024 YR4 and 2025 FA22.

== Roles in scientific organisations ==
Barucci has held several positions in the International Astronomical Union:

- organising committee member of Commission 15 (Physical Study of Comets and Minor Planets), 1991–1997
- member of the Division F (Planetary Systems and Astrobiology) steering committee, 2015–2018
- vice-president of Division F, 2018–2021
- president of Division F, 2021–2024

She is the division's advisor since 2024.

She has also served on European advisory bodies. In 2006 she joined ESA's Solar System Working Group and an ad hoc group of the European Science Foundation's European Space Sciences Committee. In 2007 she joined the advisory committee of ESA's Research and Scientific Support Department. From 2017 to 2021 she coordinated DIM ACAV+ (Astrophysique et Conditions d'Apparition de la Vie), a research network of 24 French laboratories funded by the Île-de-France region.

In France she was elected in 2015 to the astronomy section of the Conseil national des astronomes et physiciens (CNAP), the national council for the careers of astronomers and physicists at French observatories, where she served as vice-president until September 2017.

== Awards and honours ==
- 2025 – Elected corresponding member of the International Academy of Astronautics (IAA)
- 2023 – Medal of the Universe Sciences section (Médaille des sciences de l'Univers), French Academy of Sciences
- 2021 – JAXA Honor Award, for her contribution to Hayabusa2
- 2017 – NASA Silver Achievement Medal, for her contribution to the astronomical characterisation of Bennu, the target of OSIRIS-REx
- 2017 – NASA Group Achievement Award, Dawn mission
- 2009 – PROSE Award, for The Solar System Beyond Neptune (lead editor)
- 2004 – ESA achievement awards, OSIRIS and VIRTIS instruments on Rosetta
- 2000 – NASA achievement award, CIRS instrument on Cassini
- 2000 – ESA achievement award, HASI instrument on Huygens
- Main-belt asteroid 3485 Barucci, discovered by Edward Bowell in 1983, named in her honour
