= 819 Barnardiana =

Main-belt asteroid

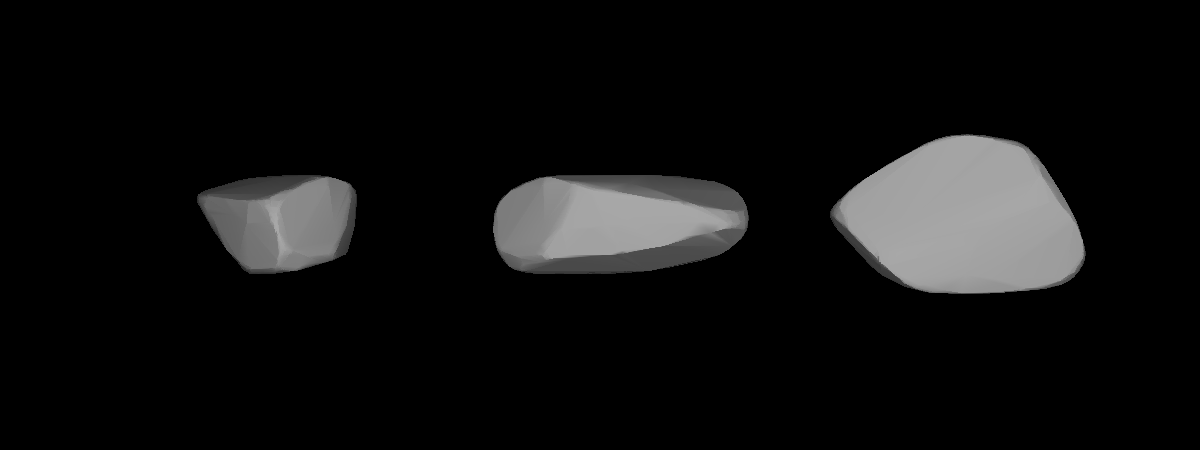
- A three-dimensional model of 819 Barnardiana based on its light curve

Discovery
- Discovered by: Max Wolf
- Discovery site: Heidelberg Observatory
- Discovery date: 3 March 1916

Designations
- Alternative designations: 1916 ZA

Orbital characteristics
- Epoch 31 July 2016 (JD 2457600.5)
- Uncertainty parameter 0
- Observation arc: 111.49 yr (40722 d)
- Aphelion: 2.5097 AU (375.45 Gm)
- Perihelion: 1.8847 AU (281.95 Gm)
- Semi-major axis: 2.1972 AU (328.70 Gm)
- Eccentricity: 0.14223
- Orbital period (sidereal): 3.26 yr (1189.6 d)
- Mean anomaly: 183.04°
- Mean motion: 0° 18^{m} 9.432^{s} / day
- Inclination: 4.8983°
- Longitude of ascending node: 333.162°
- Argument of perihelion: 306.373°

Physical characteristics
- Synodic rotation period: 66.70 h (2.779 d)
- Absolute magnitude (H): 12.0

819 Barnardiana is a minor planet orbiting the Sun, discovered on March 3, 1916, by the German astronomer Max Wolf in Heidelberg.
