= 10010 Rudruna =

Main-belt asteroid

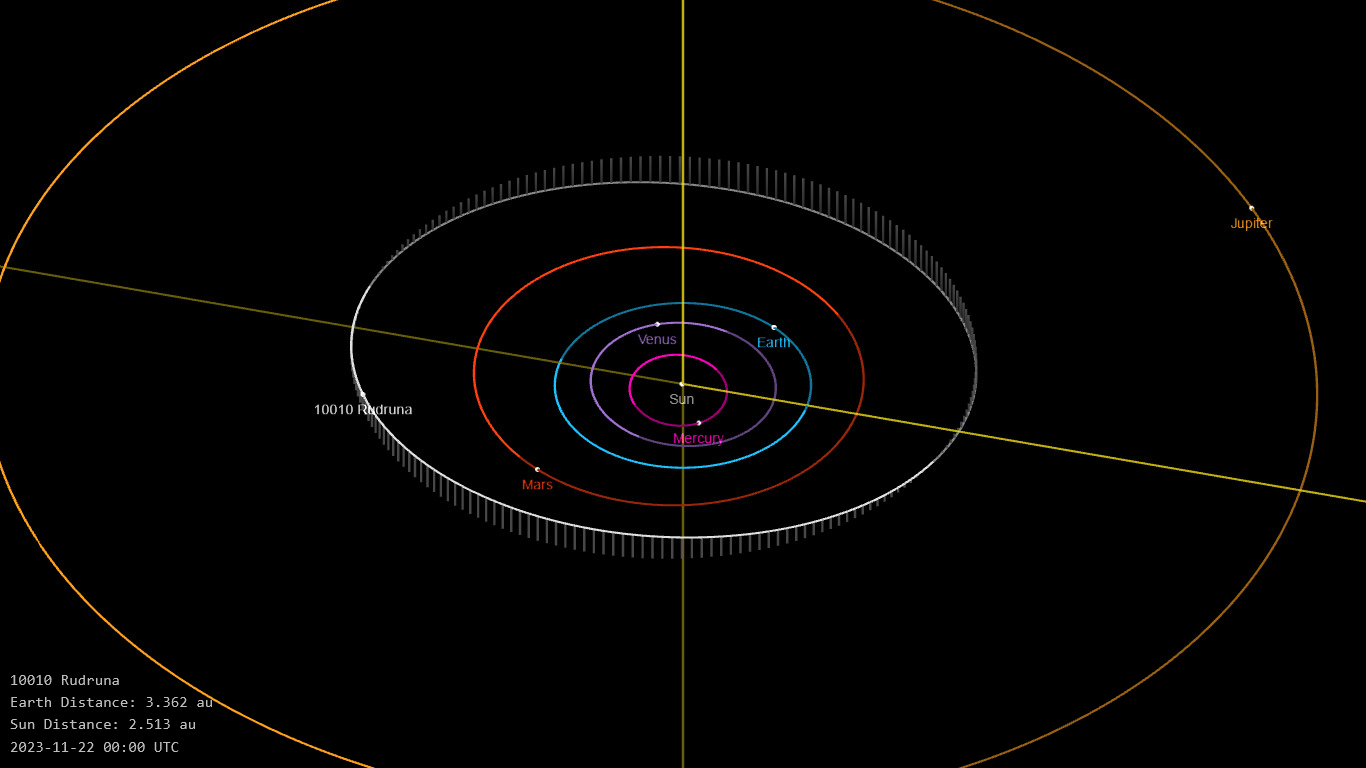
- 10010 Rudruna's orbit (shown in gray)

Discovery
- Discovered by: N. S. Chernykh and L. I. Chernykh
- Discovery site: Crimean Astrophysical Observatory
- Discovery date: August 9, 1978

Designations
- Named after: Peoples' Friendship University of Russia
- Alternative designations: 1978 PW_{3}

Orbital characteristics
- Epoch May 14, 2008
- Aphelion: 2.8237765
- Perihelion: 2.1010597
- Eccentricity: 0.1467494
- Orbital period (sidereal): 1411.3707951
- Mean anomaly: 263.60713
- Inclination: 6.43066
- Longitude of ascending node: 169.30848
- Argument of perihelion: 140.39870

Physical characteristics
- Sidereal rotation period: 10.9177 d
- Absolute magnitude (H): 14.3

10010 Rudruna (1978 PW_{3}) is a main-belt asteroid. It is orbiting the Sun with a period of 3.87 years at a distance of 2.46 AU and an eccentricity of 0.145. The orbital plane is inclined at an angle of 6.44° to the plane of the ecliptic.

It was discovered on August 9, 1978 by husband and wife team Nikolai and Lyudmila Chernykh at the Crimean Astrophysical Observatory. It is named after the Peoples' Friendship University of Russia (Russian: Российский университет дружбы народов, Rossijskij universitet druzhby narodov).

== Physical characteristics ==
The asteroid belongs to the V-type taxonomic class, having a spectrum similar to the large asteroid 4 Vesta. It is spinning with a rotation period of 10.9 days.

Based on observations from the Pan-STARRS (Panoramic Survey Telescope and Rapid Response System) telescope network and observations from the Asteroid Terrestrial-impact Last Alert System (ATLAS), the asteroid's absolute magnitude was initially estimated to be 14.39 ± 0.20^{m} (Vereš, P., et al. 2015), and later, 14.40 ± 0.137^{m} (Mahlke, M., et al. 2021).
