= 575 Renate =

Main Belt Asteroid

Discovery
- Discovered by: M. F. Wolf
- Discovery site: Heidelberg
- Discovery date: 19 September 1905

Designations
- Alternative designations: 1905 RE

Orbital characteristics
- Epoch 31 July 2016 (JD 2457600.5)
- Uncertainty parameter 0
- Observation arc: 110.31 yr (40292 d)
- Aphelion: 2.8814 AU (431.05 Gm)
- Perihelion: 2.2276 AU (333.24 Gm)
- Semi-major axis: 2.5545 AU (382.15 Gm)
- Eccentricity: 0.12796
- Orbital period (sidereal): 4.08 yr (1491.3 d)
- Mean anomaly: 80.5375°
- Mean motion: 0° 14^{m} 29.04^{s} / day
- Inclination: 15.012°
- Longitude of ascending node: 349.682°
- Argument of perihelion: 333.921°

Physical characteristics
- Mean radius: 10.63±0.75 km
- Synodic rotation period: 3.676 h (0.1532 d)
- Geometric albedo: 0.1706±0.027
- Absolute magnitude (H): 10.8

575 Renate is a minor planet, specifically an asteroid orbiting in the asteroid belt which was discovered by German astronomer Max Wolf on 19 September 1905. The name may have been inspired by the asteroid's provisional designation 1905 RE.

Photometric observations at the Palmer Divide Observatory in Colorado Springs, Colorado in 1999 were used to build a light curve for this object. The asteroid displayed a rotation period of 3.676 ± 0.002 hours and a brightness variation of 0.15 ± 0.01 in magnitude.

This is a member of the dynamic Maria family of asteroids that most likely formed as the result of a collisional breakup of a parent body.
