= 1443 Ruppina =

Main-belt asteroid

Discovery
- Discovered by: K. Reinmuth
- Discovery site: Heidelberg Obs.
- Discovery date: 29 December 1937

Designations
- Named after: Ruppin (German city)
- Alternative designations: 1937 YG · 1931 TX_{3}
- Minor planet category: main-belt · (outer)

Orbital characteristics
- Epoch 4 September 2017 (JD 2458000.5)
- Uncertainty parameter 0
- Observation arc: 85.20 yr (31,121 days)
- Aphelion: 3.1266 AU
- Perihelion: 2.7496 AU
- Semi-major axis: 2.9381 AU
- Eccentricity: 0.0642
- Orbital period (sidereal): 5.04 yr (1,840 days)
- Mean anomaly: 61.181°
- Mean motion: 0° 11^{m} 44.52^{s} / day
- Inclination: 1.9299°
- Longitude of ascending node: 174.89°
- Argument of perihelion: 163.11°

Physical characteristics
- Dimensions: 16.467±0.127 km 16.67±0.75 km 16.713±0.173 km 18±3 km 32.18 km (derived)
- Synodic rotation period: 5.880±0.001 h 5.890±0.040 h 5.9046±0.0347 h
- Geometric albedo: 0.057 (assumed); 0.176±0.017; 0.20±0.07; 0.2128±0.0392; 0.218±0.035
- Spectral type: C
- Absolute magnitude (H): 10.924±0.001 (R) · 10.970±0.120 (R) · 11.0 · 11.19±0.03 · 11.19 · 11.40

1443 Ruppina, provisional designation 1937 YG, is an asteroid from the outer region of the asteroid belt, approximately 17 kilometers in diameter. It was discovered on 29 December 1937, by German astronomer Karl Reinmuth at Heidelberg Observatory in southwest Germany. It is named for the German city Ruppin.

== Orbit and classification ==
Ruppina asteroid orbits the Sun in the outer main-belt at a distance of 2.7–3.1 AU once every 5.04 years (1,840 days). Its orbit has an eccentricity of 0.06 and an inclination of 2° with respect to the ecliptic. In 1931, Ruppina was first identified as 1931 TX_{3} at Lowell Observatory, extending the body's observation arc by 6 years prior to its official discovery at Heidelberg.

== Physical characteristics ==
=== Rotation period ===
In November 2007, the first rotational lightcurve of Ruppina was obtained at Whitin Observatory in Massachusetts, United States. Lightcurve analysis gave a well-defined rotation period of 5.880 hours with a brightness variation of 0.35 magnitude (U=3). During the 2014-apparition of Ruppina, an identical period was obtained again at Whitin Observatory (U=3), while photometric observations in the R-band at the Palomar Transient Factory in California, gave a period of 5.890 and 5.9046 hours with an amplitude of 0.27 and 0.28, respectively (U=2/2).

=== Diameter and albedo ===
According to the surveys carried out by the Japanese Akari satellite and NASA's Wide-field Infrared Survey Explorer with its subsequent NEOWISE mission, Ruppina measures approximately 16.5 kilometers in diameter and its surface has an albedo of 0.176 and 0.21, respectively. Observations at the Whitin Observatory gave an albedo of 0.20 and a diameter of 18 kilometers, while the Collaborative Asteroid Lightcurve Link assumes a standard albedo for carbonaceous C-type asteroids of 0.057, and consequently derives a much larger diameter of 32.18 kilometers with an absolute magnitude of 11.19.

== Naming ==
This minor planet is named for the German city of Ruppin, birthplace of astronomer Martin Ebell, who proposed the name and after whom the minor planet 1205 Ebella is named. The official naming citation was published in The Names of the Minor Planets by Paul Herget in 1955 (H 130).
