= 437 Rhodia =

Main-belt asteroid

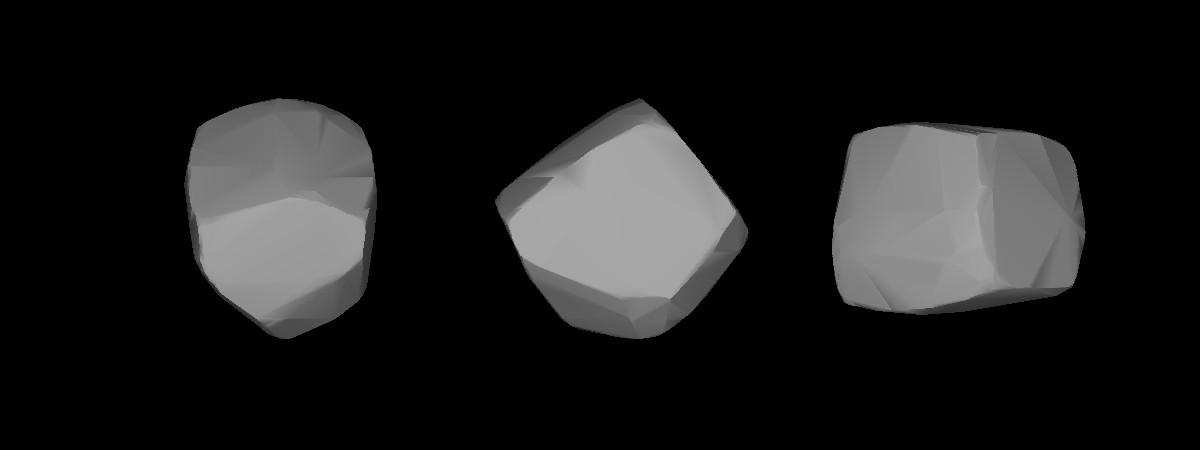
- Lightcurve-base 3D-model of 437 Rhodia.

Discovery
- Discovered by: Auguste Charlois
- Discovery date: 16 July 1898

Designations
- Pronunciation: /roʊˈdaɪə/
- Named after: Ῥόδεια Rhodeia
- Alternative designations: 1898 DP
- Minor planet category: Main belt

Orbital characteristics
- Epoch 31 July 2016 (JD 2457600.5)
- Uncertainty parameter 0
- Observation arc: 117.73 yr (43,001 d)
- Aphelion: 2.9793 AU (445.70 Gm)
- Perihelion: 1.79242 AU (268.142 Gm)
- Semi-major axis: 2.38586 AU (356.920 Gm)
- Eccentricity: 0.24873
- Orbital period (sidereal): 3.69 yr (1,346.1 d)
- Mean anomaly: 355.267°
- Mean motion: 0° 16^{m} 2.82^{s} / day
- Inclination: 7.3442°
- Longitude of ascending node: 263.22°
- Argument of perihelion: 62.058°

Physical characteristics
- Dimensions: 13.12±0.7 km
- Synodic rotation period: 56 h (2.3 d)
- Geometric albedo: 0.7035±0.084
- Absolute magnitude (H): 10.41

437 Rhodia is a Main belt asteroid that was discovered by French astronomer Auguste Charlois on 16 July 1898 in Nice. It was named after one of the Oceanid nymphs of Greek mythology. This asteroid is orbiting the Sun at a distance of 2.39 AU with a period of 3.69 years and an eccentricity (ovalness) of 0.25. The orbital plane is tilted at an angle of 7.3° to the plane of the ecliptic. 437 Rhodia was originally a proposed fly-by target of interest for the Rosetta mission.

Analysis of the bimodal light curve generated using photometric data show a lengthy rotation period of 433.2 ± 0.5 hours (18.05 ± 0.02 days) with a brightness variation of 0.35±0.05 in magnitude. It also appears to be tumbling. 437 Rhodia is classified as an E-type asteroid with a diameter of approximately 13 km. This object has the highest albedo in the IRAS dataset, with a value of 0.70±0.08.
