= Białystok (meteorite) =

Meteorite found in Poland

- Type: Achondrite
- Class: HED meteorites
- Group: Eucrite-pmict
- Country: Poland
- Region: Podlaskie
- Coordinates: 53°06′N 23°12′E
- Observed fall: Yes
- Fall date: October 5, 1827
- TKW: ~4 kg
- Strewn field: Yes

Białystok is a eucrite meteorite (previously classified as howardite) that fell on 5 October 1827 in the area of Fasty and Knyszyn villages, NNW of Białystok, Poland. The fall occurred at around 9:30 am. Several specimens were recovered.

== See also ==
- Glossary of meteoritics
- Meteorite fall
