= Howardite =

Group of achondrites that originate from the asteroid 4 Vesta

- — Group —
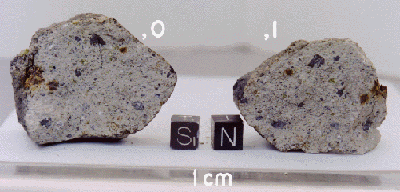
- QUE94200, a Howardite about 5 centimetres (2.0 in) across, found in the Queen Alexandra Range in Antarctica.
- Compositional type: Stony
- Type: Achondrite
- Class: Asteroidal achondrite
- Clan: HED meteorite
- Parent body: 4 Vesta
- Total known specimens: ~200

Howardites are achondritic stony meteorites that originate from the surface of the asteroid 4 Vesta, and as such are part of the HED meteorite clan. There are about 200 distinct members known.

== Characteristics ==
They are a regolith breccia consisting mostly of eucrite and diogenite fragments, although carbonaceous chondrules and impact melt can also occur. The rock formed from impact ejecta which was later buried by newer impacts and lithified due to the pressure from overlying layers. Regolith breccias are not found on Earth due to a lack of regolith on bodies which have an atmosphere.

== Name ==
Howardites are named for Edward Howard, a pioneer of meteoritics. An arbitrary divide between howardites and the polymict eucrites is a 9:1 ratio of eucrite to diogenite fragments.

== See also ==
- Glossary of meteoritics
