= 4 Vesta =

Second largest main-belt asteroid

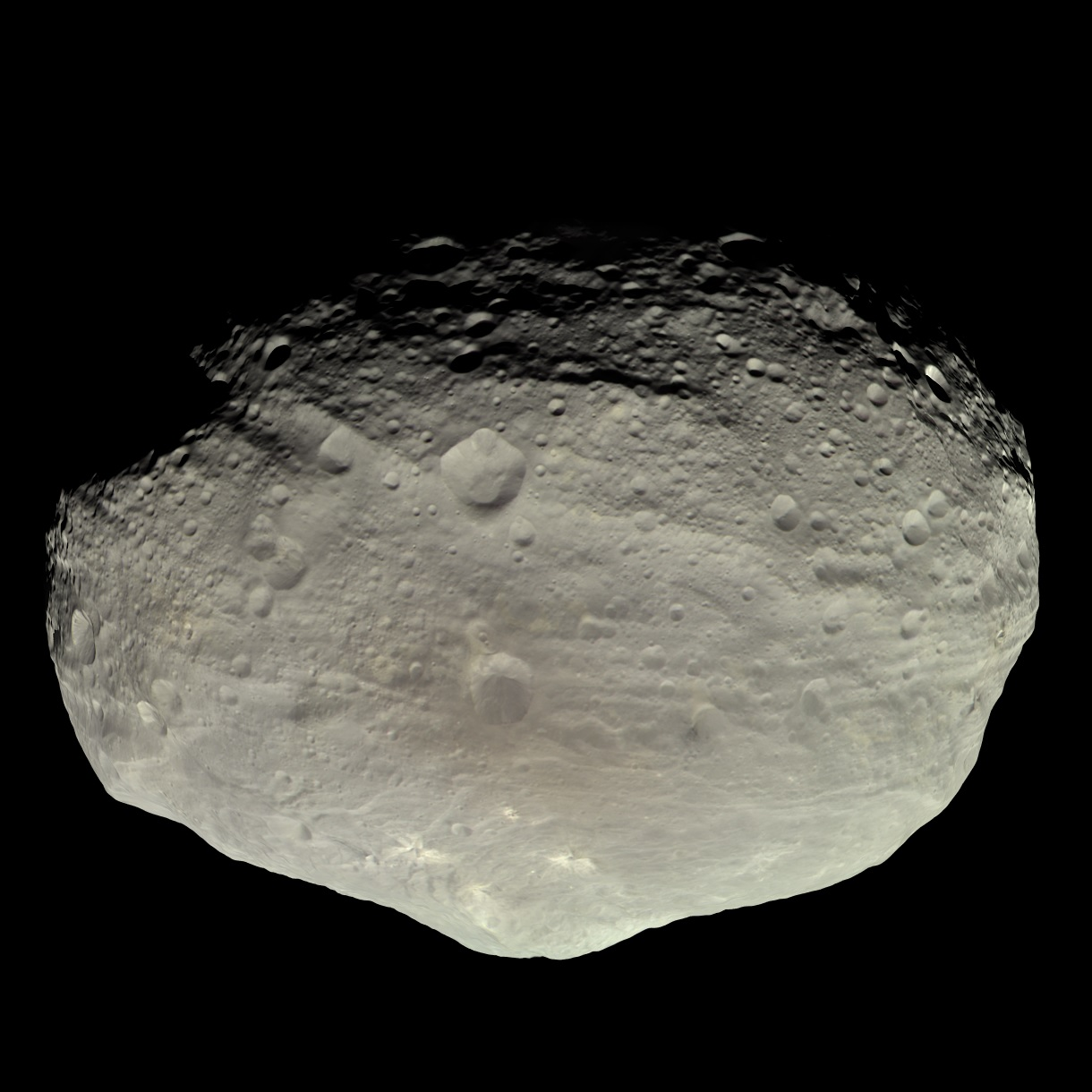
- True color image of Vesta taken by Dawn. The vast Rheasilvia Crater dominates Vesta's south pole.

Discovery
- Discovered by: Heinrich Wilhelm Olbers
- Discovery date: 29 March 1807

Designations
- Pronunciation: /ˈvɛstə/
- Named after: Vesta
- Minor planet category: Main belt (Vesta family)
- Adjectives: Vestan; Vestian (Note: Marc Rayman of the JPL Dawn team used "Vestian" (analogous to the Greek cognate Hestian) a few times in 2010 and early 2011 in his Dawn Journal, and the Planetary Society continued to use that form for a few more years. The word had been used elsewhere, e.g. in Tsiolkovsky (1960) The call of the cosmos. However, otherwise the shorter form "Vestan" has been used by JPL. Most modern print sources also use "Vestan". Note that the related word "Vestalian" refers to people or things associated with Vesta, such as the vestal virgins, not to Vesta herself.)
- Symbol: (historical astronomical) (modern astrological)

Orbital characteristics
- Epoch 13 September 2023 (JD 2453300.5)
- Aphelion: 2.57 AU (384 million km)
- Perihelion: 2.15 AU (322 million km)
- Semi-major axis: 2.36 AU (353 million km)
- Eccentricity: 0.0894
- Orbital period (sidereal): 3.63 yr (1325.86 d)
- Average orbital speed: 19.34 km/s
- Mean anomaly: 169.4°
- Inclination: 7.1422° to ecliptic 5.58° to invariable plane
- Longitude of ascending node: 103.71°
- Time of perihelion: 14 August 2025
- Argument of perihelion: 151.66°
- Satellites: None
- Earth MOID: 1.14 AU (171 million km)

Proper orbital elements
- Proper semi-major axis: 2.36151 AU
- Proper eccentricity: 0.098758
- Proper inclination: 6.39234°
- Proper mean motion: 99.1888 deg / yr
- Proper orbital period: 3.62944 yr (1325.654 d)
- Precession of perihelion long.: 36.8729 (2343 years) arcsec / yr
- Precession of asc. node: −39.5979 (2182 years) arcsec / yr

Physical characteristics
- Dimensions: (569.24 × 554.48 × 452.46) ± 0.1 km
- Mean diameter: 522.77±0.1 km
- Flattening: 0.204
- Surface area: 9.0152×10^{5} km^{2}
- Volume: (7.49±0.01)×10^{7} km^{3}
- Mass: (2.59028±0.00006)×10^{20} kg
- Mean density: 3.460±0.005 g/cm^{3}
- Equatorial surface gravity: 0.22 m/s^{2} (0.022 g_{0})
- Moment of inertia factor: 0.4208 ± 0.0047
- Equatorial escape velocity: 0.36 km/s
- Synodic rotation period: 5.3421276322±0.0000000004 h
- Equatorial rotation velocity: 91.8 m/s (Note: Calculated using (1) the known rotation period (5.342 h) and (2) the equatorial radius R_{eq} (280.89 km) of the best-fit spheroid to Asteroid 4 Vesta.)
- Axial tilt: 27.46241136°
- North pole right ascension: 309.06110°±0.00031° (Note: At Epoch J2000.)
- North pole declination: 42.232386°±0.000068°
- Geometric albedo: 0.423
- Temperature: min: 75 K (−198 °C) max: 250 K (−23 °C)
- Spectral type: V
- Apparent magnitude: 5.1 to 8.48
- Absolute magnitude (H): 3.25; 3.20
- Angular diameter: 0.70″ to 0.22″

Vesta (minor-planet designation: 4 Vesta) is one of the objects in the asteroid belt, with a mean diameter of 523 kilometres (325 mi). It was discovered by the German astronomer Heinrich Wilhelm Matthias Olbers on 29 March 1807 and is named after Vesta, the virgin goddess of home and hearth from Roman mythology.

Vesta is thought to be the second-largest asteroid, both by mass and by volume, after the dwarf planet Ceres. Measurements give it a nominal volume only slightly larger than that of Pallas (about 5% greater), but it is 25% to 30% more massive. It constitutes an estimated 9% of the mass of the asteroid belt. Vesta is the only known remaining rocky protoplanet of the kind that formed the terrestrial planets. Numerous fragments of Vesta were ejected by collisions one and two billion years ago that left two enormous craters occupying much of Vesta's southern hemisphere. Debris from these events has fallen to Earth as howardite–eucrite–diogenite (HED) meteorites, which have been a rich source of information about Vesta.

Vesta is the brightest asteroid visible from Earth. It is regularly as bright as magnitude 5.1, at which times it is faintly visible to the naked eye. Its maximum distance from the Sun is slightly greater than the minimum distance of Ceres from the Sun, (Note: On 10 February 2009, during Ceres perihelion, Ceres was closer to the Sun than Vesta, because Vesta has an aphelion distance greater than Ceres's perihelion distance. (10 February 2009: Vesta 2.56 AU; Ceres 2.54 AU)) although its orbit lies entirely within that of Ceres.

NASA's Dawn spacecraft entered orbit around Vesta on 16 July 2011 for a one-year exploration and left the orbit of Vesta on 5 September 2012 en route to its final destination, Ceres. Researchers continue to examine data collected by Dawn for additional insights into the formation and history of Vesta.

== History ==
=== Discovery ===
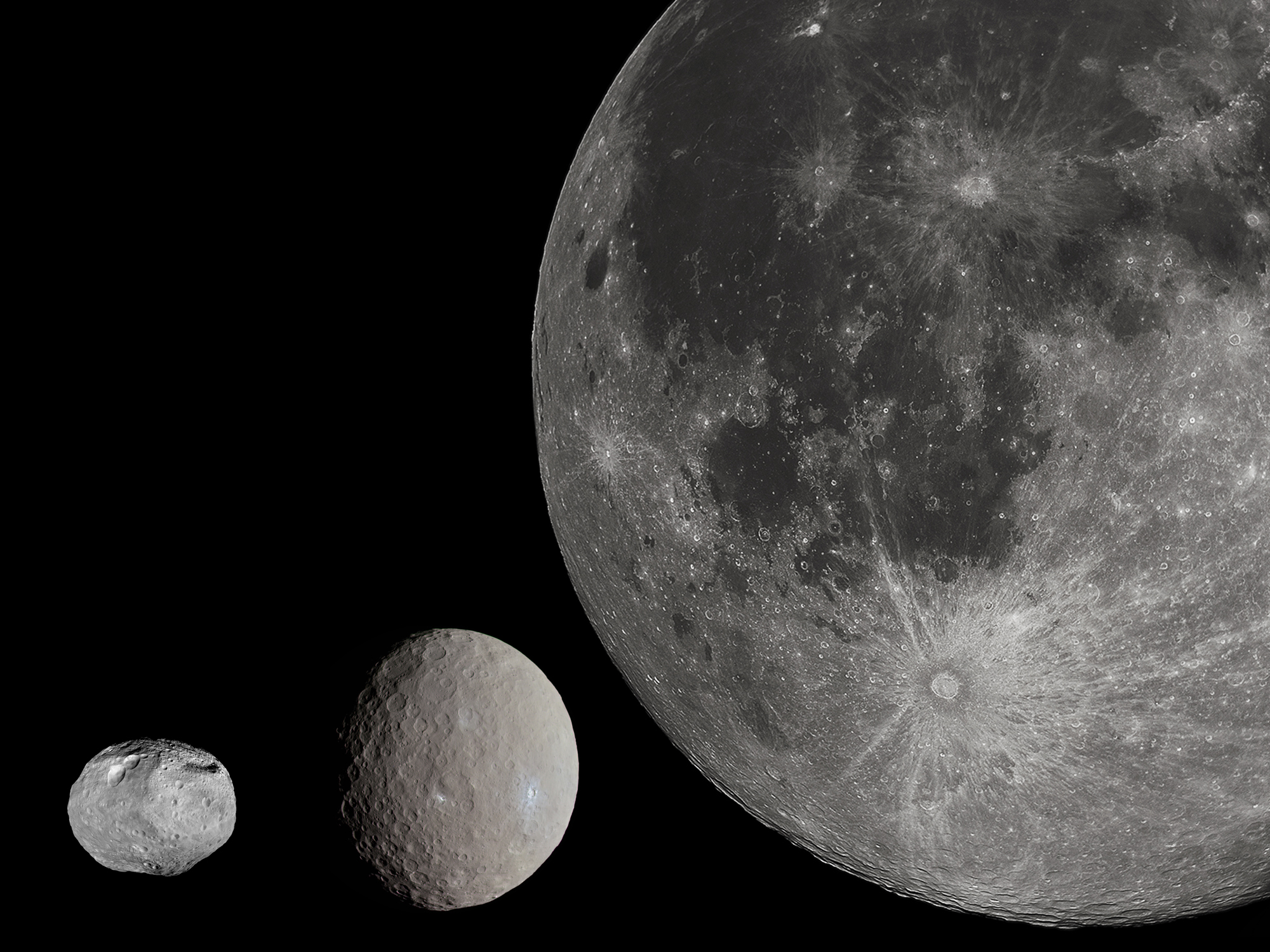
Vesta, Ceres, and the Moon with sizes shown to scale

Heinrich Olbers discovered Pallas in 1802, the year after the discovery of Ceres. He proposed that the two objects were the remnants of a destroyed planet. He sent a letter with his proposal to the British astronomer William Herschel, suggesting that a search near the locations where the orbits of Ceres and Pallas intersected might reveal more fragments. These orbital intersections were located in the constellations of Cetus and Virgo. Olbers commenced his search in 1802, and on 29 March 1807 he discovered Vesta in the constellation Virgo—a coincidence, because Ceres, Pallas, and Vesta are not fragments of a larger body. Because the asteroid Juno had been discovered in 1804, this made Vesta the fourth object to be identified in the region that is now known as the asteroid belt. The discovery was announced in a letter addressed to German astronomer Johann H. Schröter dated 31 March. Because Olbers already had credit for discovering a planet (Pallas; at the time, the asteroids were considered to be planets), he gave the honor of naming his new discovery to German mathematician Carl Friedrich Gauss, whose orbital calculations had enabled astronomers to confirm the existence of Ceres, the first asteroid, and who had computed the orbit of the new planet in the remarkably short time of 10 hours. Gauss decided on the Roman virgin goddess of home and hearth, Vesta.

=== Name and symbol ===
Vesta was the fourth asteroid to be discovered, hence the number 4 in its formal designation. The name Vesta, or national variants thereof, is in international use with two exceptions: Greece and China. In Greek, the name adopted was the Hellenic equivalent of Vesta, Hestia (4 Εστία); in English, that name is used for 46 Hestia (Greeks use the name "Hestia" for both, with the minor-planet numbers used for disambiguation). In Chinese, Vesta is called the 'hearth-god(dess) star', 灶神星 Zàoshénxīng, naming the asteroid for Vesta's role in mythology, similar to the Chinese names of Uranus, Neptune, and Pluto. (Note: 維斯塔 wéisītǎ is the closest Chinese approximation of the Latin pronunciation westa.)

Upon its discovery, Vesta was, like Ceres, Pallas, and Juno before it, classified as a planet and given a planetary symbol. The symbol represented the altar of Vesta with its sacred fire and was designed by Gauss. In Gauss's conception, now obsolete, this was drawn. His form was encoded in Unicode 17.0 as U+1F777 🝷. (Note: Some sources contemporaneous to Gauss invented more elaborate forms, such as and. A simplification of the latter from c. 1930,, never caught on.) The asteroid symbols were gradually retired from astronomical use after 1852, but the symbols for the first four asteroids were resurrected for astrology in the 1970s. The abbreviated modern astrological variant of the Vesta symbol is (U+26B6 ⚶). (Note: This symbol can be seen in the top of the most elaborate of the earlier forms,. It dates from 1973, at the beginning of astrological interest in asteroids.)

After the discovery of Vesta, no further objects were discovered for 38 years, and during this time the Solar System was thought to have eleven planets. However, in 1845, new asteroids started being discovered at a rapid pace, and by 1851 there were fifteen, each with its own symbol, in addition to the eight major planets (Neptune had been discovered in 1846). It soon became clear that it would be impractical to continue inventing new planetary symbols indefinitely, and some of the existing ones proved difficult to draw quickly. That year, the problem was addressed by Benjamin Apthorp Gould, who suggested numbering asteroids in their order of discovery, and placing this number in a disk (circle) as the generic symbol of an asteroid. Thus, the fourth asteroid, Vesta, acquired the generic symbol ④. This was soon coupled with the name into an official number–name designation, ④ Vesta, as the number of minor planets increased. By 1858, the circle had been simplified to parentheses, (4) Vesta, which were easier to typeset. Other punctuation, such as 4) Vesta and 4, Vesta, was also briefly used, but had more or less completely died out by 1949.

=== Early measurements ===
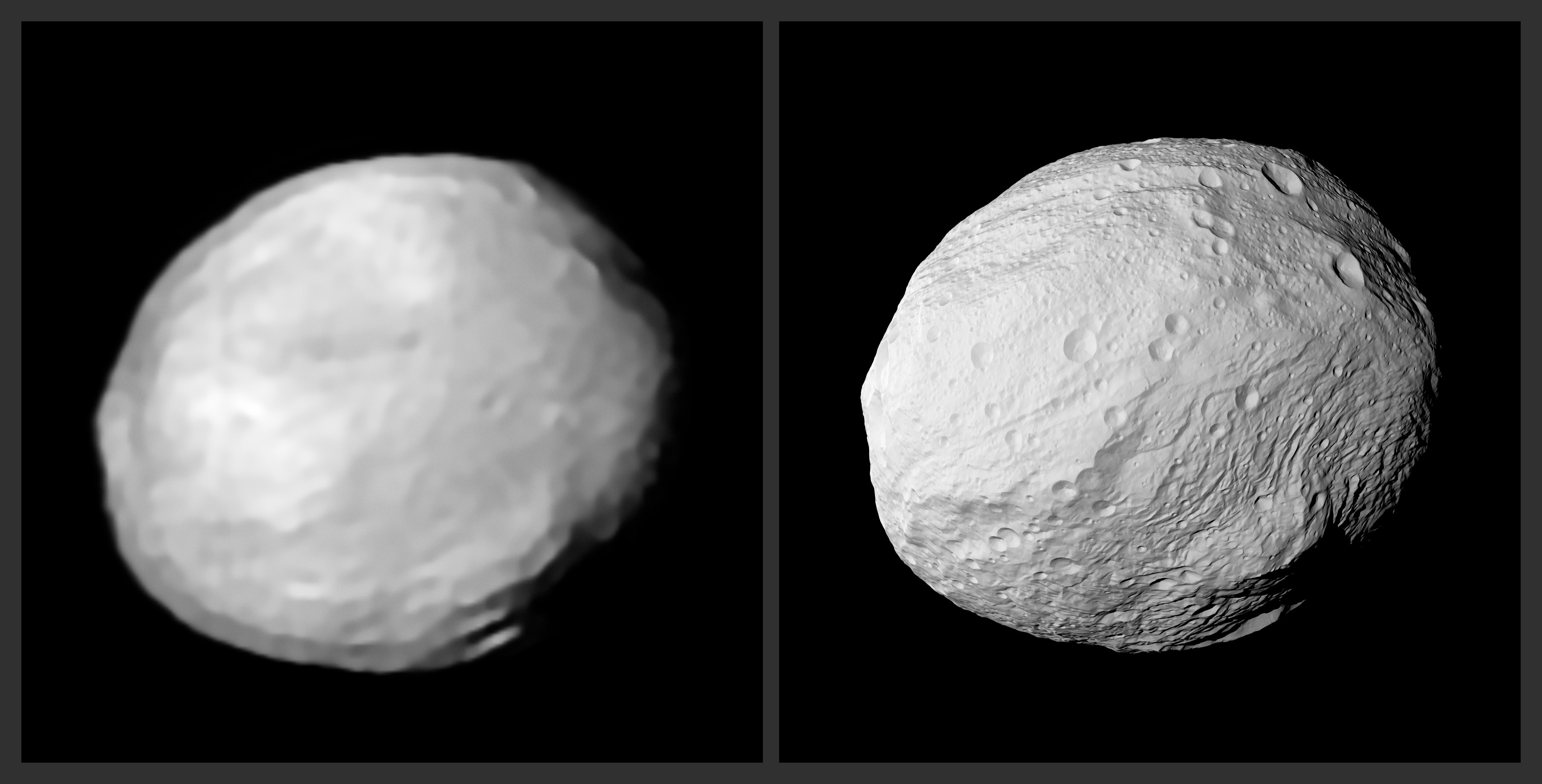
SPHERE image is shown on the left, with a synthetic view derived from Dawn images shown on the right for comparison.

Photometric observations of Vesta were made at the Harvard College Observatory in 1880–1882 and at the Observatoire de Toulouse in 1909. These and other observations allowed the rotation rate of Vesta to be determined by the 1950s. However, the early estimates of the rotation rate came into question because the light curve included variations in both shape and albedo.

Early estimates of the diameter of Vesta ranged from 383 kilometres (238 mi) in 1825, to 444 km (276 mi). E.C. Pickering produced an estimated diameter of 513 ± 17 km (319 ± 11 mi) in 1879, which is close to the modern value for the mean diameter, but the subsequent estimates ranged from a low of 390 km (242 mi) up to a high of 602 km (374 mi) during the next century. The measured estimates were based on photometry. In 1989, speckle interferometry was used to measure a dimension that varied between 498 and 548 km (309 and 341 mi) during the rotational period. In 1991, an occultation of the star SAO 93228 by Vesta was observed from multiple locations in the eastern United States and Canada. Based on observations from 14 different sites, the best fit to the data was an elliptical profile with dimensions of about 550 km × 462 km (342 mi × 287 mi). Dawn confirmed this measurement. (Note: The data returned will include, for both asteroids, full surface imagery, full surface spectrometric mapping, elemental abundances, topographic profiles, gravity fields, and mapping of remnant magnetism, if any.) These measurements will help determine the thermal history, size of the core, role of water in asteroid evolution and what meteorites found on Earth come from these bodies, with the ultimate goal of understanding the conditions and processes present at the solar system's earliest epoch and the role of water content and size in planetary evolution.

Vesta became the first asteroid to have its mass determined. Every 18 years, the asteroid 197 Arete approaches within 0.04 AU of Vesta. In 1966, based upon observations of Vesta's gravitational perturbations of Arete, Hans G. Hertz estimated the mass of Vesta at (1.20±0.08)×10^{−10} M_{☉} (solar masses). More refined estimates followed, and in 2001 the perturbations of 17 Thetis were used to calculate the mass of Vesta to be (1.31±0.02)×10^{−10} M_{☉}. Dawn determined it to be 1.3029×10^{−10} M_{☉}.

== Orbit ==
Vesta orbits the Sun between Mars and Jupiter, within the asteroid belt, with a period of 3.6 Earth years, specifically in the inner asteroid belt, interior to the Kirkwood gap at 2.50 AU. Its orbit is moderately inclined (i = 7.1°, compared to 7° for Mercury and 17° for Pluto) and moderately eccentric (e = 0.09, about the same as for Mars).

True orbital resonances between asteroids are considered unlikely. Because of their small masses relative to their large separations, such relationships should be very rare. Nevertheless, Vesta is able to capture other asteroids into temporary 1:1 resonant orbital relationships (for periods up to 2 million years or more) and about forty such objects have been identified. Decameter-sized objects detected in the vicinity of Vesta by Dawn may be such quasi-satellites rather than proper satellites.

== Rotation ==
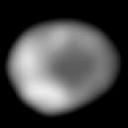
Olbers Regio (dark area) defines the prime meridian in the IAU coordinate system. It is shown here in a Hubble shot of Vesta, because it is not visible in the more detailed Dawn images.

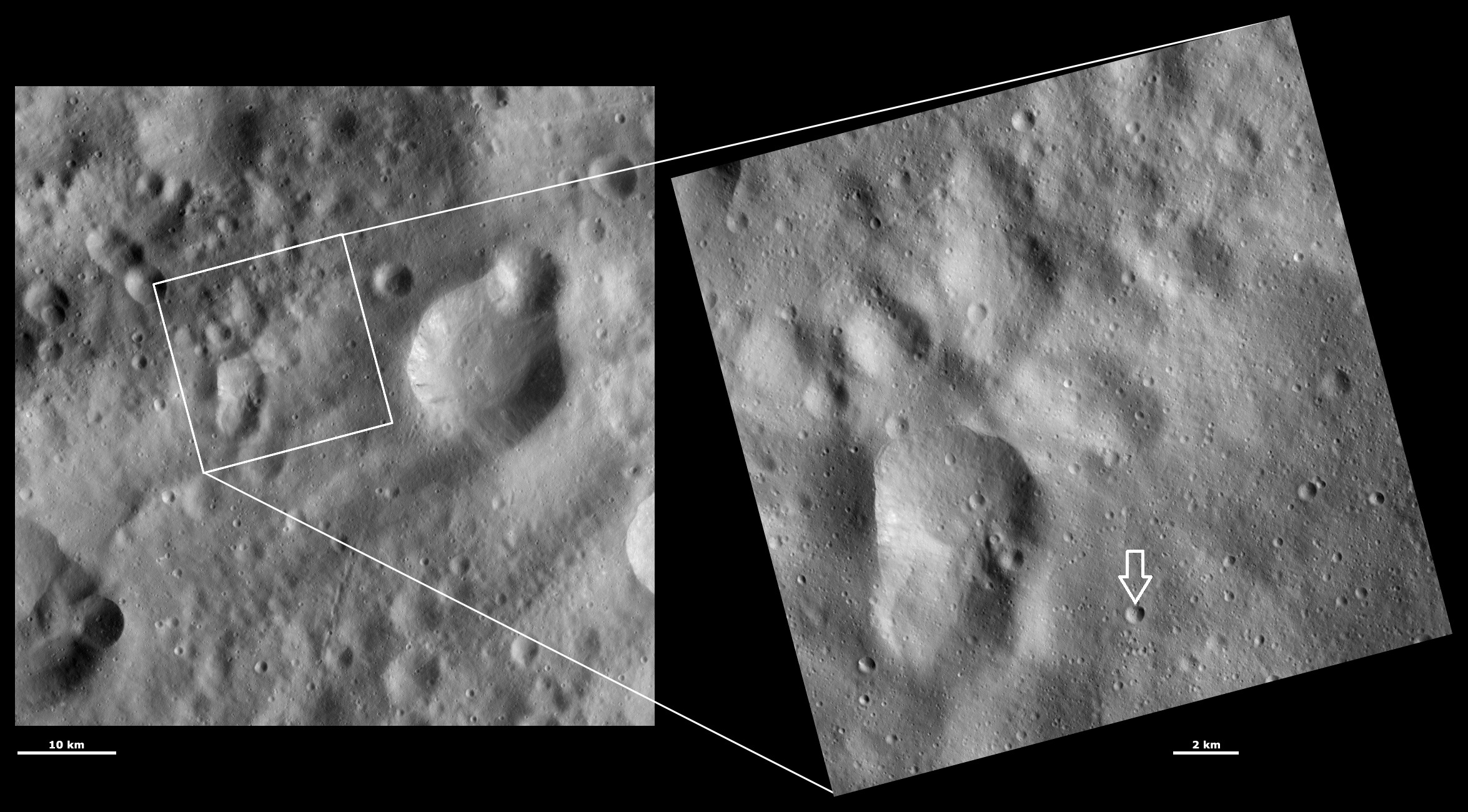
Claudia crater (indicated by the arrow at the bottom of the closeup image at right) defines the prime meridian in the Dawn/NASA coordinate system.

Vesta's rotation is relatively fast for an asteroid (5.342 h). The rotation is prograde, with the north pole pointing in the direction of right ascension 309.0°, declination +42.7° in the constellation Cygnus. This gives an axial tilt of 27.5°.

== Coordinate systems ==
Two longitudinal coordinate systems are used for Vesta, with prime meridians separated by 150°. The IAU established a coordinate system in 1997 based on Hubble photos, with the prime meridian running through the center of Olbers Regio, a dark feature 200 km (120 mi) across. When Dawn arrived at Vesta, mission scientists found that the location of the pole assumed by the IAU was off by 10°, so that the IAU coordinate system drifted across the surface of Vesta at 0.06° per year, and also that Olbers Regio was not discernible from up close, and so was not adequate to define the prime meridian with the precision they needed. They corrected the pole, but also established a new prime meridian 4° from the center of Claudia, a sharply defined crater 700 m (2,300 ft) across, which they say results in a more logical set of mapping quadrangles. All NASA publications, including images and maps of Vesta, use the Claudian meridian, which is unacceptable to the IAU. The IAU Working Group on Cartographic Coordinates and Rotational Elements recommended a coordinate system, correcting the pole but rotating the Claudian longitude by 150° to coincide with Olbers Regio. It was accepted by the IAU, although it disrupts the maps prepared by the Dawn team, which had been positioned so they would not bisect any major surface features.

== Physical characteristics ==
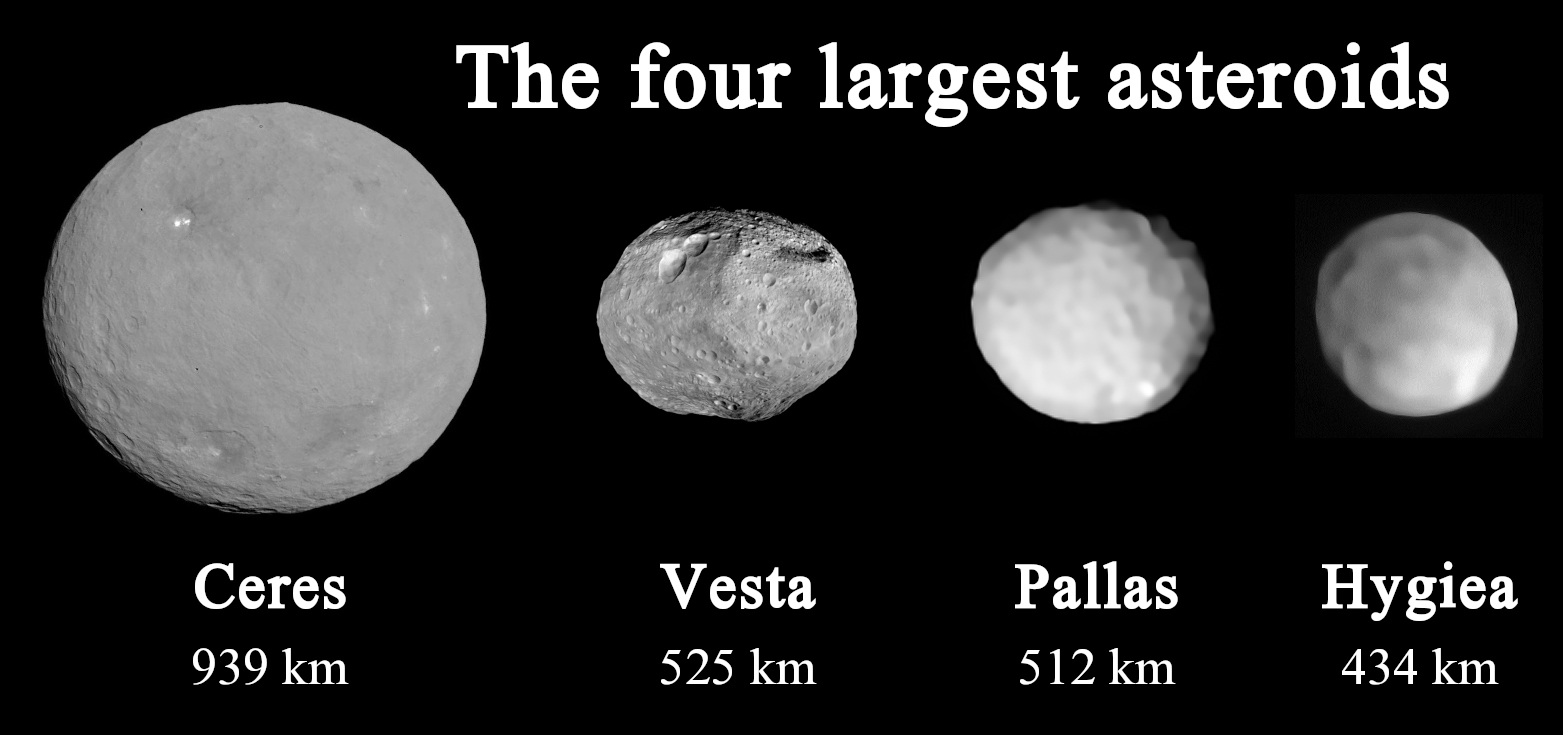
Relative sizes of the four largest asteroids. Vesta is second from left.

The mass of 4 Vesta (dark green) compared to other large asteroids and the remainder of the Main Belt. The unit of mass is×10^{18} kg. (Note: Other objects in the Solar system with well-defined masses within a factor of 2 of Vesta's mass are Varda, Gǃkúnǁʼhòmdímà, and Salacia (245, 136, and 492×10^{18} kg, respectively). No moons are in this range: the closest, Tethys (Saturn III) and Enceladus (Saturn II), are over twice and less than half of Vesta's mass.)
1. 4 Vesta 259 (10.8%)
2. 2 Pallas 204 (8.52%)
3. 10 Hygiea 87 (3.63%)
4. 704 Interamnia 35 (1.46%)
5. 15 Eunomia 30 (1.25%)
6. other ≈ 841 (35.1%)
7. 1 Ceres 938 (39.2%)

Vesta is the second most massive body in the asteroid belt, although it is only 28% as massive as Ceres, the most massive body. Vesta is, however, the most massive body that formed in the asteroid belt, as Ceres is believed to have formed between Jupiter and Saturn. Vesta's density is lower than those of the four terrestrial planets but is higher than those of most asteroids, as well as all of the moons in the Solar System except Io. Vesta's surface area is about the same as the land area of Pakistan, Venezuela, Tanzania, or Nigeria; slightly over 900,000 km^{2} (350,000 mi^{2}; 90 million ha; 220 million acres). It has an only partially differentiated interior. Vesta is only slightly larger (522.77±0.1 km) than 2 Pallas (512±3 km) in mean diameter, but is about 25% more massive.

Vesta's shape is close to a gravitationally relaxed oblate spheroid, but the large concavity and protrusion at the southern pole (see 'Surface features' below) combined with a mass less than 5×10^{20} kg precluded Vesta from automatically being considered a dwarf planet under International Astronomical Union (IAU) Resolution XXVI 5. A 2012 analysis of Vesta's shape and gravity field using data gathered by the Dawn spacecraft has shown that Vesta is currently not in hydrostatic equilibrium.

Temperatures on the surface have been estimated to lie between about −20 °C (253 K) with the Sun overhead, dropping to about −190 °C (83.1 K) at the winter pole. Typical daytime and nighttime temperatures are −60 °C (213 K) and −130 °C (143 K), respectively. This estimate is for 6 May 1996, very close to perihelion, although details vary somewhat with the seasons.

== Surface features ==
Before the arrival of the Dawn spacecraft, some Vestan surface features had already been resolved using the Hubble Space Telescope and ground-based telescopes (e.g., the Keck Observatory). The arrival of Dawn in July 2011 revealed the complex surface of Vesta in detail.

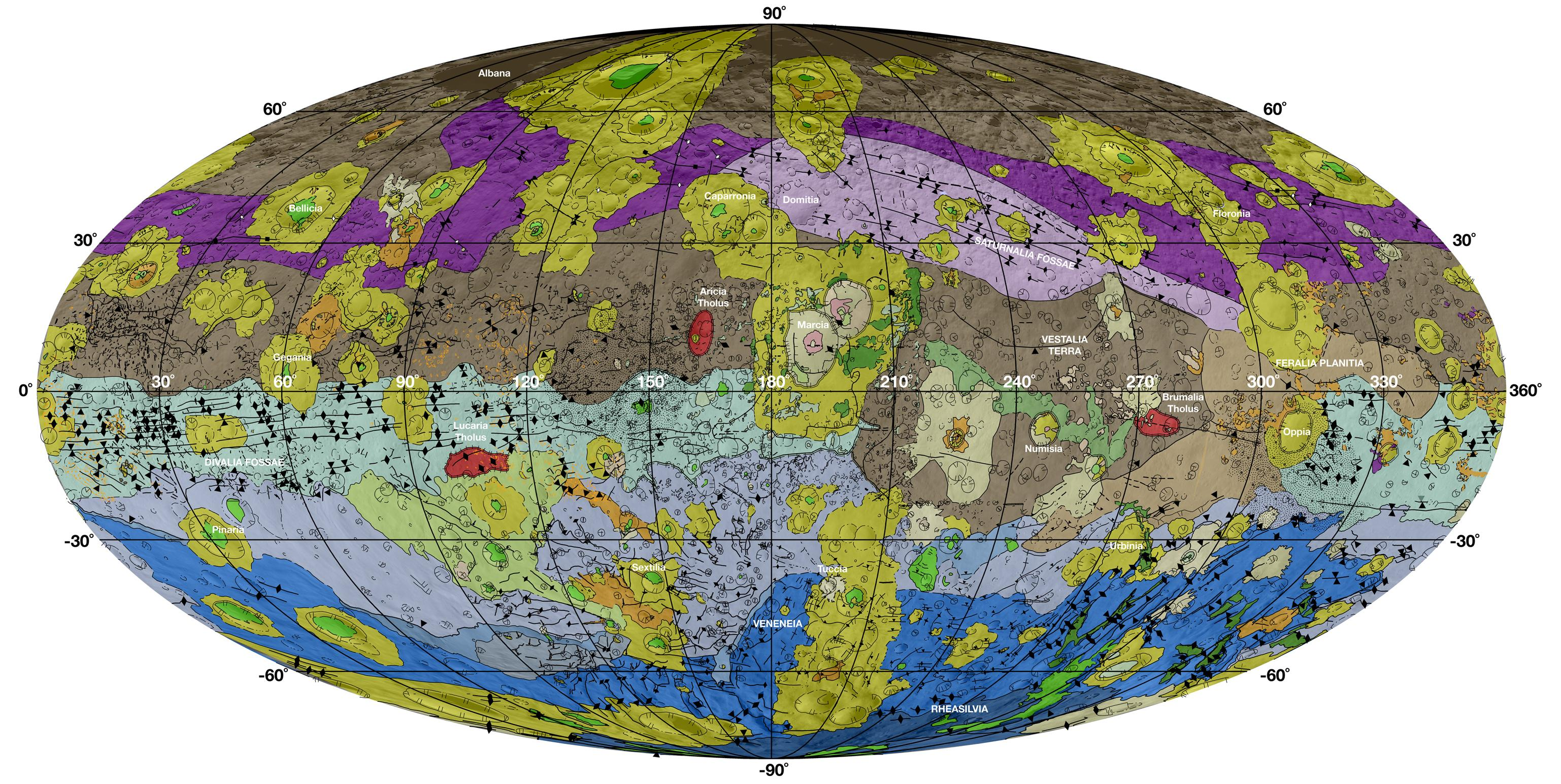
Geologic map of Vesta (Mollweide projection). The most ancient and heavily cratered regions are brown; areas modified by the Veneneia and Rheasilvia impacts are purple (the Saturnalia Fossae Formation, in the north) and light cyan (the Divalia Fossae Formation, equatorial), respectively; the Rheasilvia impact basin interior (in the south) is dark blue, and neighboring areas of Rheasilvia ejecta (including an area within Veneneia) are light purple-blue; areas modified by more recent impacts or mass wasting are yellow/orange or green, respectively.

=== Rheasilvia and Veneneia ===
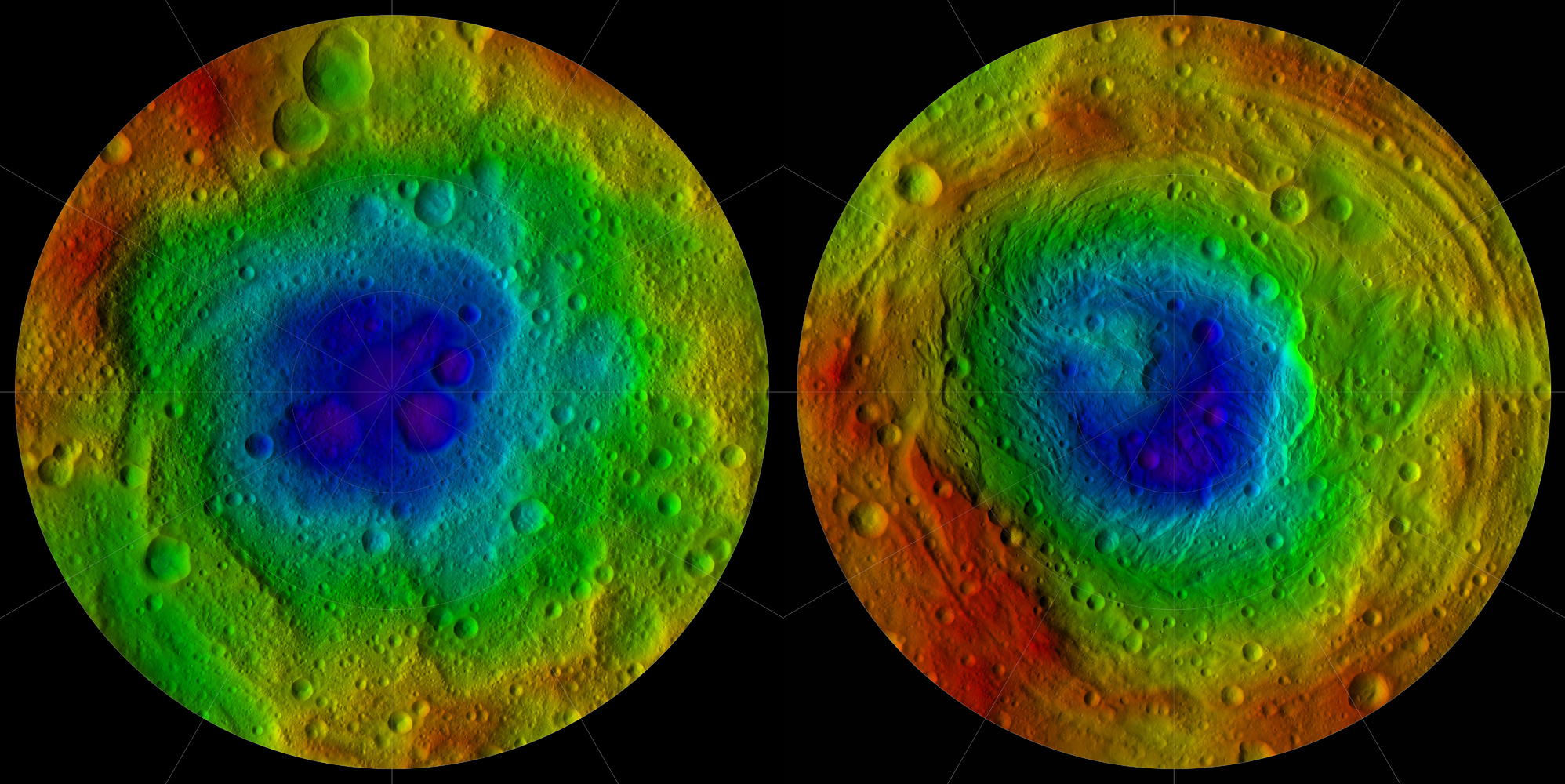
Northern (left) and southern (right) hemispheres. The "Snowman" craters are at the top of the left image; Rheasilvia and Veneneia (green and blue) dominate the right. Parallel troughs are seen in both. Colors of the two hemispheres are not to scale, (Note: that is, blue in the north does not mean the same thing as blue in the south.) and the equatorial region is not shown.

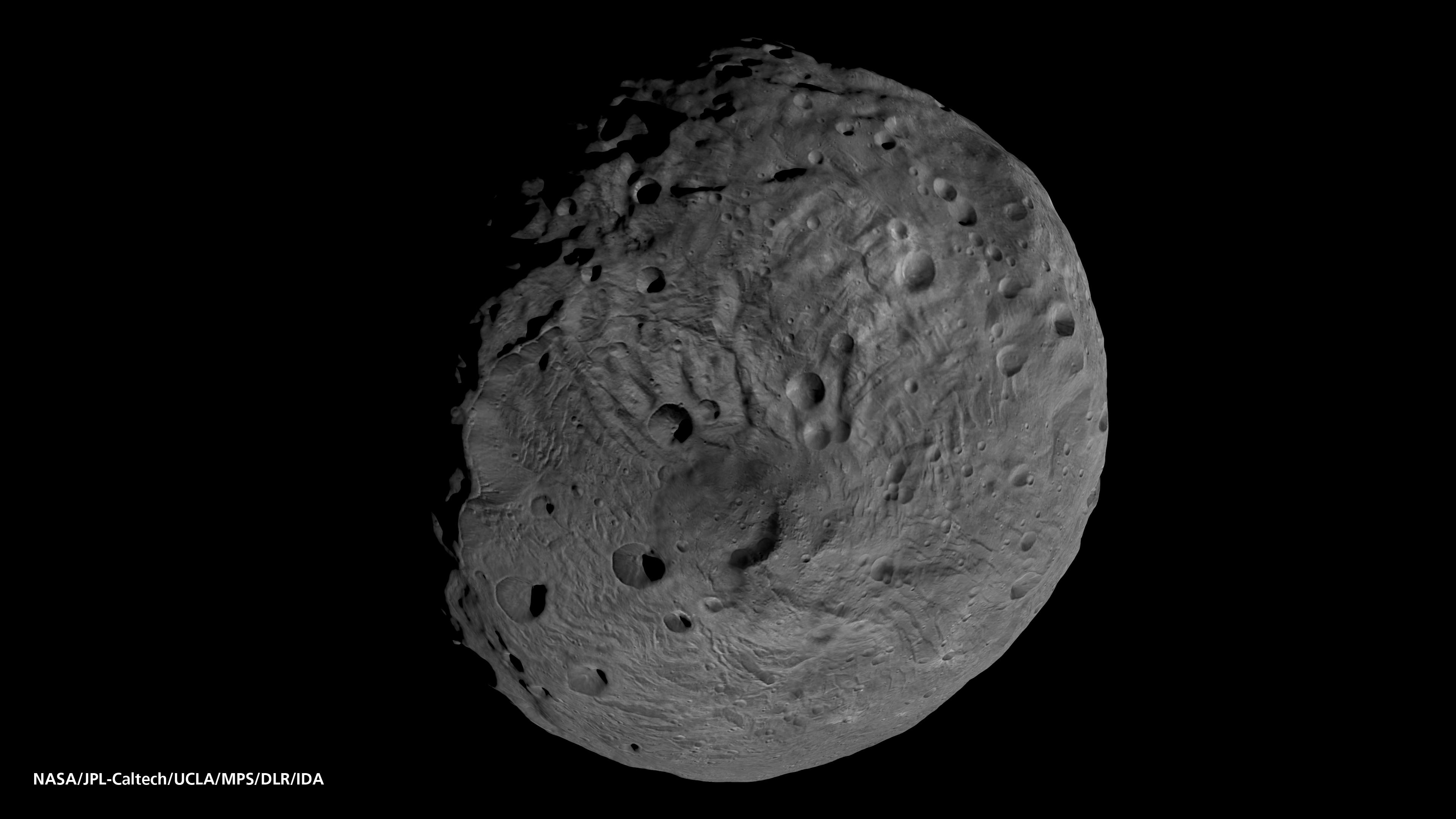
South pole of Vesta, showing the extent of Rheasilvia crater.

The most prominent of these surface features are two enormous impact basins, the 500-kilometre-wide (311 mi) Rheasilvia, centered near the south pole; and the 400-kilometre-wide (249 mi) Veneneia. The Rheasilvia impact basin is younger and overlies the Veneneia. The Dawn science team named the younger, more prominent crater Rheasilvia, after the mother of Romulus and Remus and a mythical vestal virgin. Its width is 95% of the mean diameter of Vesta. The crater is about 19 km (12 mi) deep. A central peak rises 23 km (14 mi) above the lowest measured part of the crater floor and the highest measured part of the crater rim is 31 km (19 mi) above the crater floor low point. It is estimated that the impact responsible excavated about 1% of the volume of Vesta, and it is likely that the Vesta family and V-type asteroids are the products of this collision. If this is the case, then the fact that 10 km (6 mi) fragments have survived bombardment until the present indicates that the crater is at most only about 1 billion years old. It would also be the site of origin of the HED meteorites. All the known V-type asteroids taken together account for only about 6% of the ejected volume, with the rest presumably either in small fragments, ejected by approaching the 3:1 Kirkwood gap, or perturbed away by the Yarkovsky effect or radiation pressure. Spectroscopic analyses of the Hubble images have shown that this crater has penetrated deep through several distinct layers of the crust, and possibly into the mantle, as indicated by spectral signatures of olivine.

Subsequent analysis of data from the Dawn mission provided much greater detail on Rheasilvia's structure and composition, confirming it as one of the largest impact structures known relative to its parent body size. The impact clearly modified the pre-existing very large, Veneneia structure, indicating Rheasilvia's younger age. Rheasilvia's size makes Vesta's southern topography unique, creating a flattened southern hemisphere and contributing significantly to the asteroid's overall oblate shape. Rheasilvia's ~22 km (14 mi) central peak stands as one of the tallest mountains identified in the Solar System. Its base width of roughly 180 km (110 mi) and complex morphology distinguishes it from the simpler central peaks seen in smaller craters. Numerical modeling indicates that such a large central structure within a ~505 km (314 mi) diameter basin requires formation on a differentiated body with significant gravity. Scaling laws for craters on smaller asteroids fail to predict such a feature; instead, impact dynamics involving transient crater collapse and rebound of the underlying material (potentially upper mantle) are needed to explain its formation. Hydrocode simulations suggest the impactor responsible was likely 60–70 km (37–43 mi) across, impacting at roughly 5.4 km/s (3.4 mi/s). Models of impact angle (around 30–45 degrees from vertical) better match the detailed morphology of the basin and its prominent peak. Crater density measurements on Rheasilvia's relatively unmodified floor materials and surrounding ejecta deposits, calibrated using standard lunar chronology functions adapted for Vesta's location, place the impact event at approximately 1 billion years ago. This age makes Rheasilvia a relatively young feature on a protoplanetary body formed early in Solar System history. The estimated excavation of ~1% of Vesta's volume provides a direct link to the Vesta family of asteroids (Vestoids) and the HED meteorites. Since Vesta's spectral signature matches that of the Vestoids and HEDs, this strongly indicates they are fragments ejected from Vesta most likely during the Rheasilvia impact.

The Dawn mission's VIR instrument helped to confirm the basin's deep excavation and compositional diversity. VIR mapping revealed spectral variations across the basin consistent with the mixing of different crustal layers expected in the HED meteorites. Signatures matching eucrites (shallow crustal basalts) and diogenites (deeper crustal orthopyroxenites) were identified, which usually correlate with specific morphological features like crater walls or slump blocks. The confirmed signature of olivine-rich material, which were first hinted at by Hubble observations is strongest on the flanks of the central peak and in specific patches along the basin rim and walls, suggesting it is not uniformly distributed but rather exposed in distinct outcrops. As the dominant mineral expected in Vesta's mantle beneath the HED-like crust, the presence of olivine indicates the Rheasilvia impact penetrated Vesta's entire crust (~20–40 km (12–25 mi) thick in the region) and excavated material from the upper mantle. Furthermore, the global stresses resulting from this massive impact are considered the likely trigger for the formation of the large trough systems, like Divalia Fossa, that encircle Vesta's equatorial regions.

=== Other craters ===
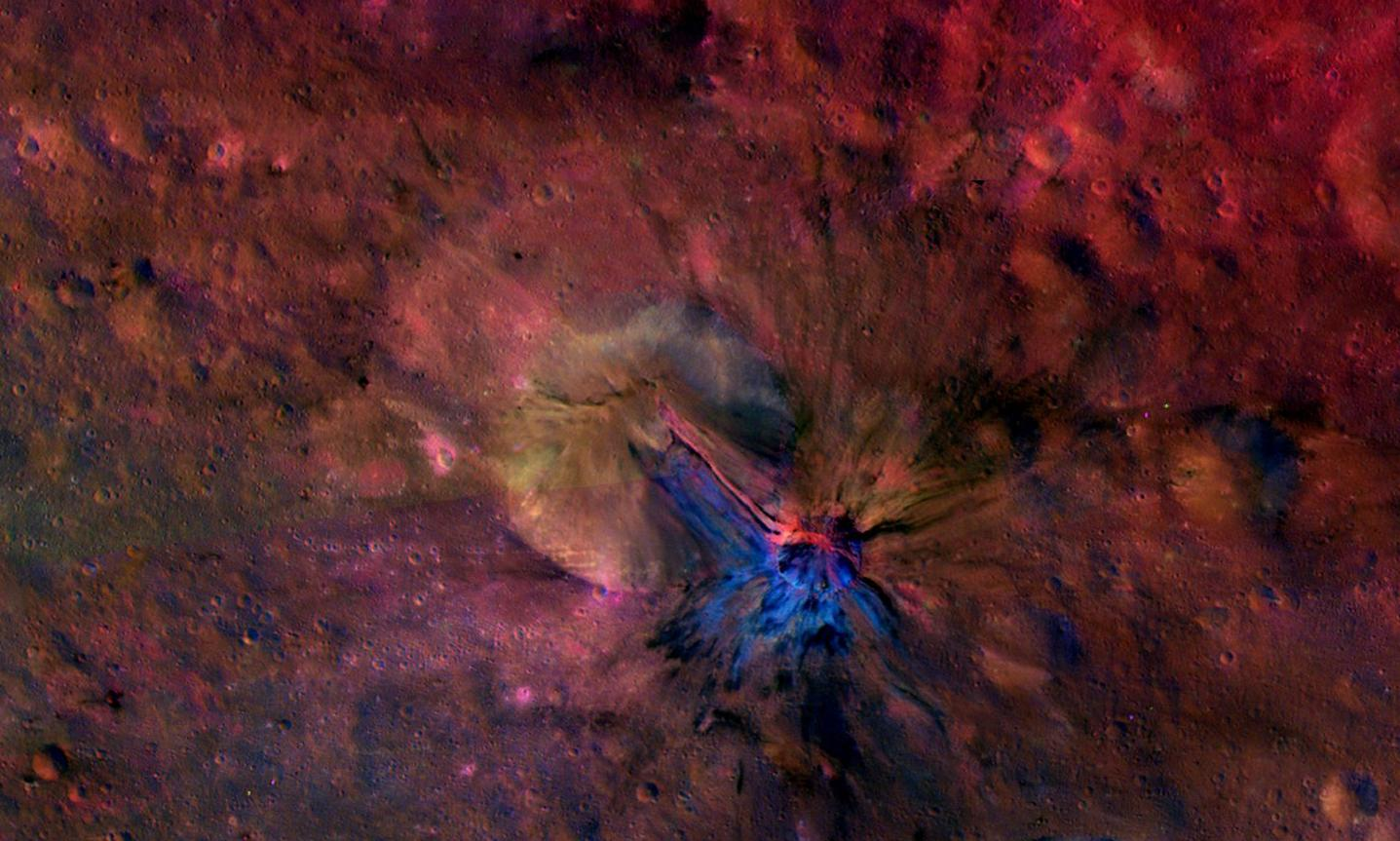
The crater Aelia

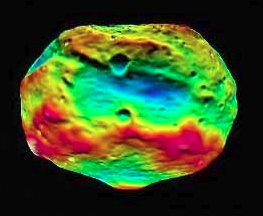
Feralia Planitia, an old, degraded impact basin or impact basin complex near Vesta's equator (green and blue). It is 270 km (168 mi) across and predates Rheasilvia (green at bottom)

Several old, degraded craters approach Rheasilvia and Veneneia in size, although none are quite so large. They include Feralia Planitia, shown at right, which is 270 km (168 mi) across. More-recent, sharper craters range up to 158 km (98 mi) Varronilla and 196 km (122 mi) Postumia.

Dust fills up some craters, creating so-called dust ponds. They are a phenomenon where pockets of dust are seen in celestial bodies without a significant atmosphere. These are smooth deposits of dust accumulated in depressions on the surface of the body (like craters), contrasting from the Rocky terrain around them. On the surface of Vesta, we have identified both type 1 (formed from impact melt) and type 2 (electrostatically made) dust ponds within 0˚–30°N/S, that is, Equatorial region. 10 craters have been identified with such formations.

==== "Snowman craters" ====
The "snowman craters" are a group of three adjacent craters in Vesta's northern hemisphere. Their official names, from largest to smallest (west to east), are Marcia, Calpurnia, and Minucia. Marcia is the youngest and cross-cuts Calpurnia. Minucia is the oldest.

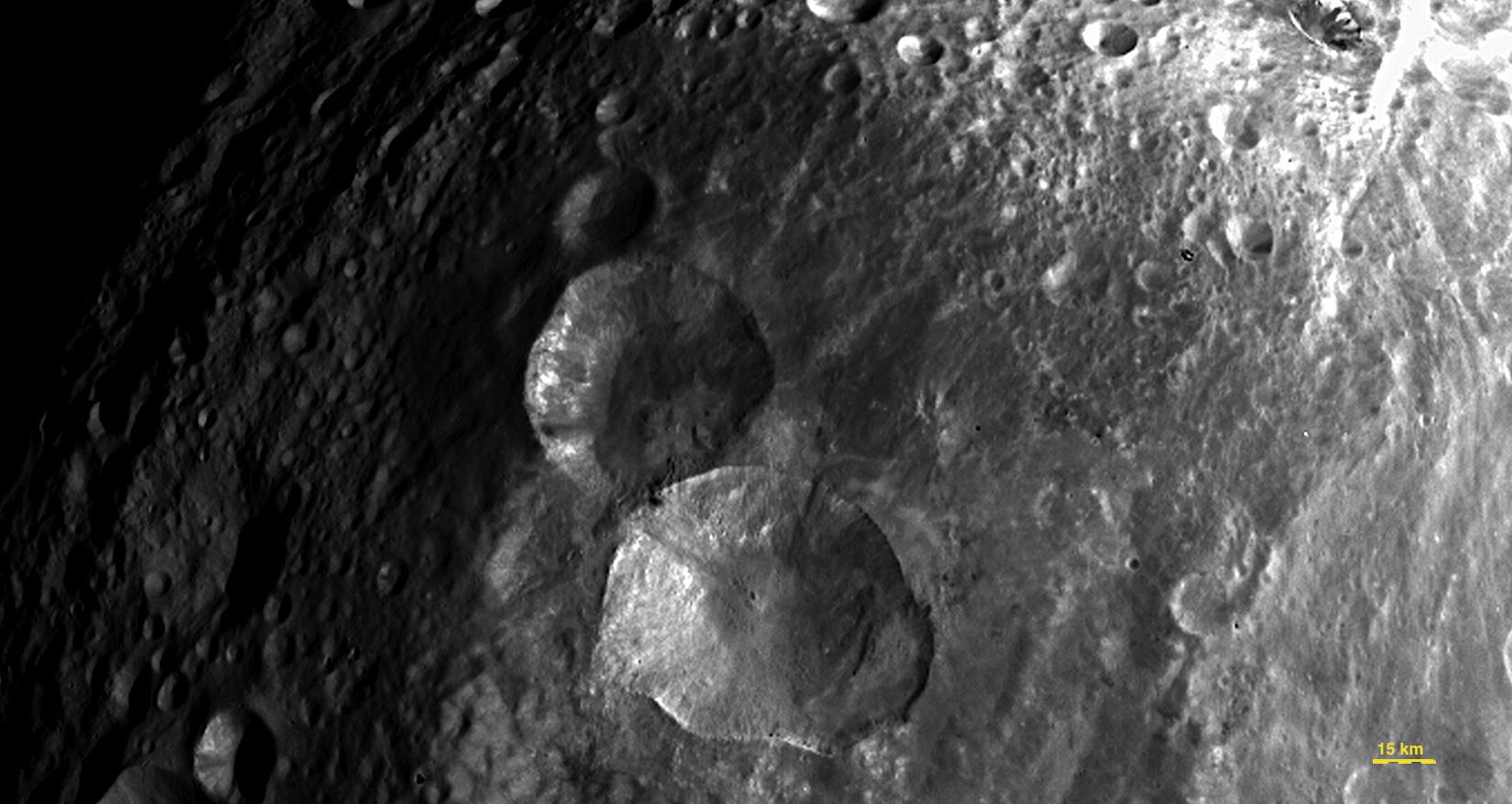
"Snowman" craters by Dawn from 5,200 km (3,200 mi) in 2011

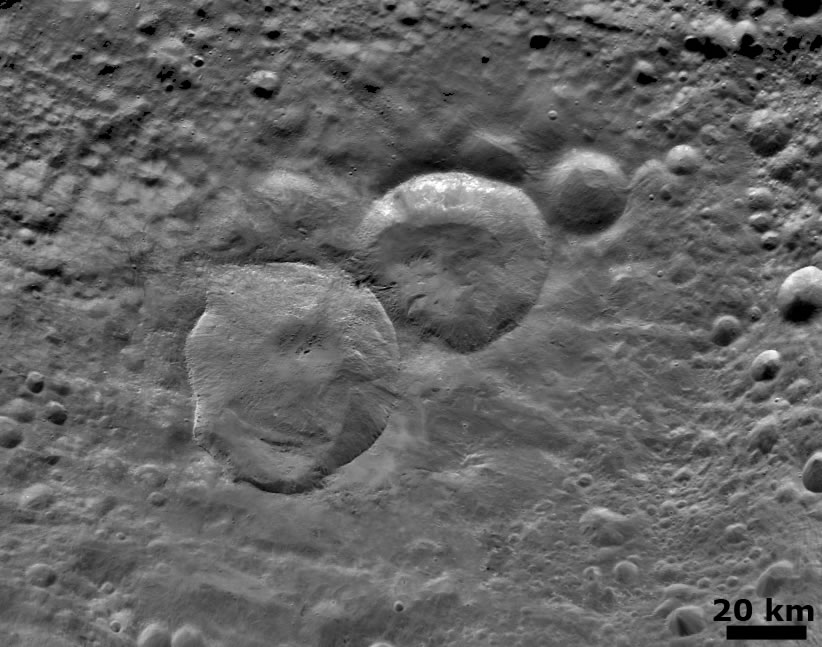
Detailed image of the "Snowman" craters

=== Troughs ===
The majority of the equatorial region of Vesta is sculpted by a series of parallel troughs designated Divalia Fossae; its longest trough is 10–20 kilometres (6.2–12.4 mi) wide and 465 kilometres (289 mi) long. Despite the fact that Vesta is one-seventh the size of the Moon, Divalia Fossae dwarfs the Grand Canyon. A second series, inclined to the equator, is found further north. This northern trough system is named Saturnalia Fossae, with its largest trough being roughly 40 km (25 mi) wide and over 370 km (230 mi) long. These troughs are thought to be large-scale graben resulting from the impacts that created Rheasilvia and Veneneia craters, respectively. They are some of the longest chasms in the Solar System, nearly as long as Ithaca Chasma on Tethys. The troughs may be graben that formed after another asteroid collided with Vesta, a process that can happen only in a body that is differentiated, which Vesta may not fully be. Alternatively, it is proposed that the troughs may be radial sculptures created by secondary cratering from Rheasilvia.

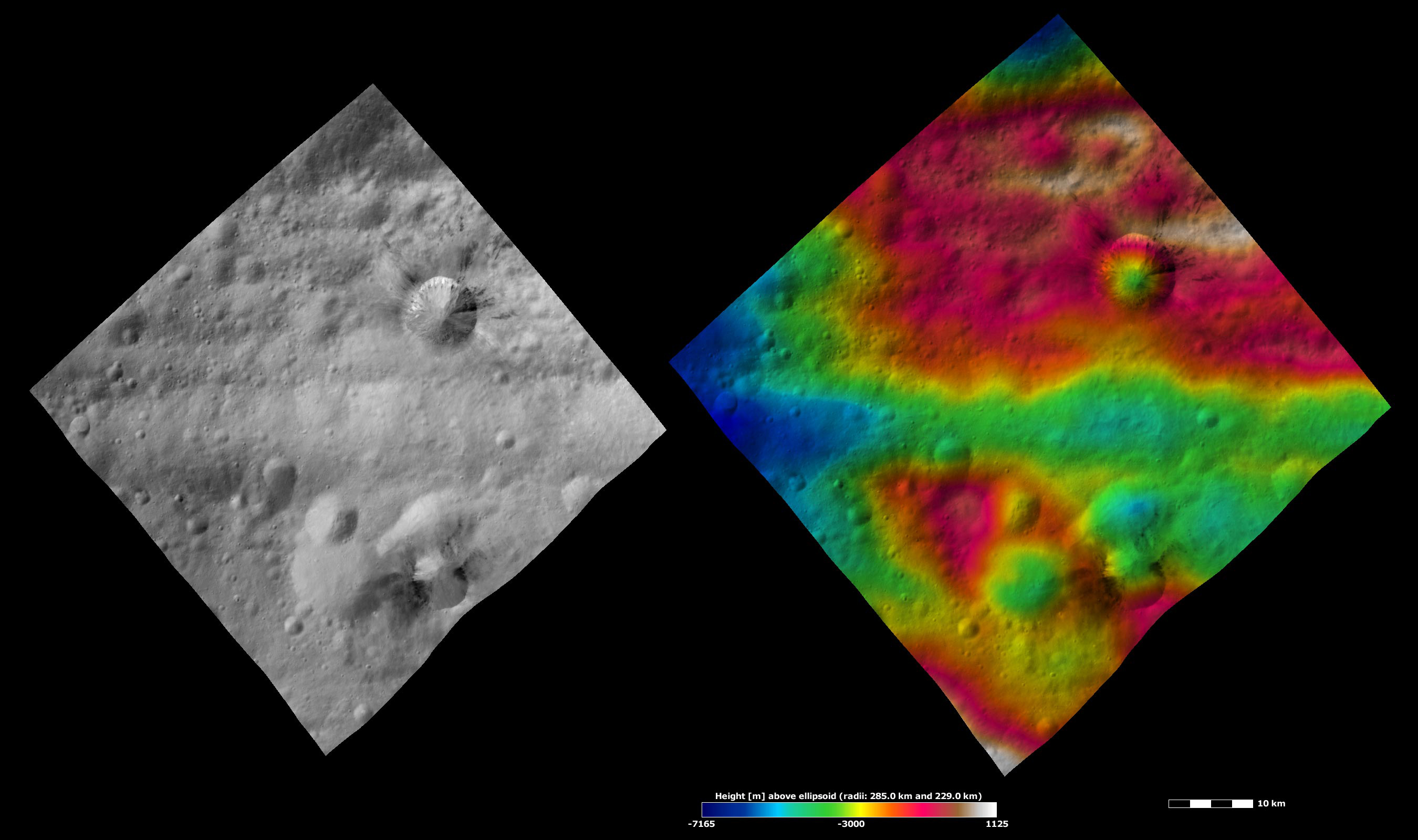
A section of Divalia Fossae, with parallel troughs to the north and south

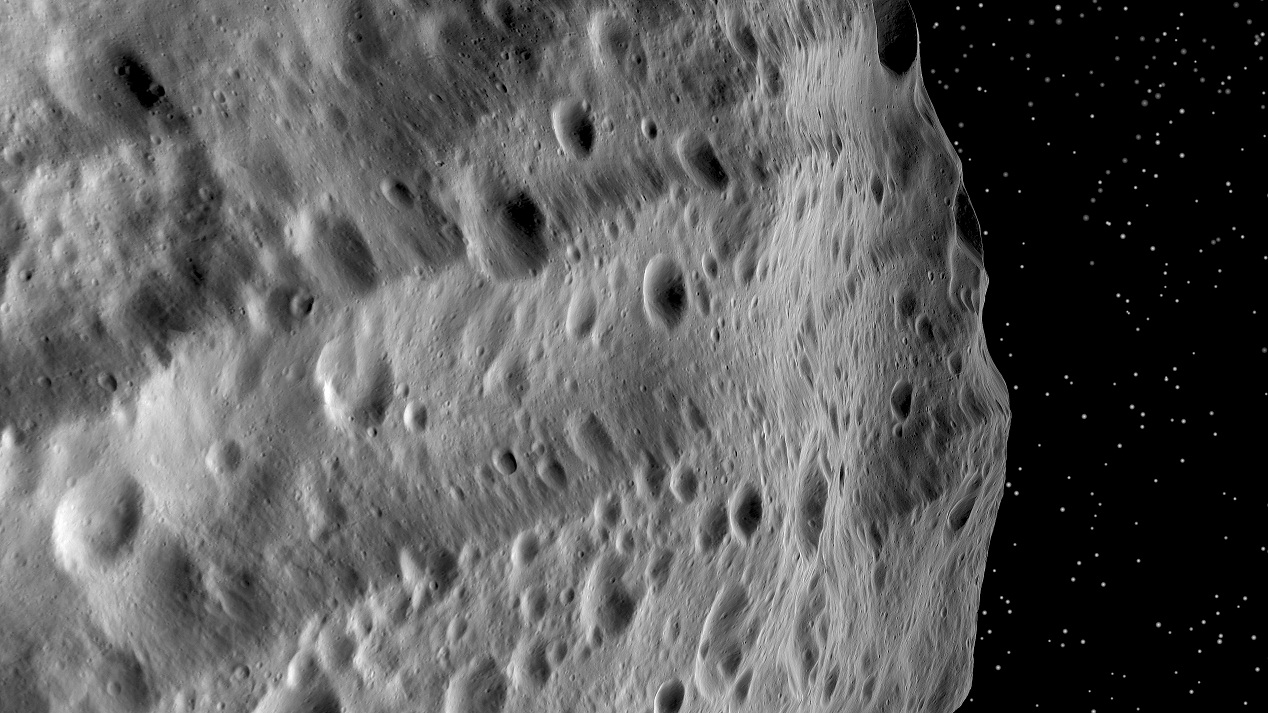
A computer-generated view of a portion of Divalia Fossae

=== Surface composition ===
Compositional information from the visible and infrared spectrometer (VIR), gamma-ray and neutron detector (GRaND), and framing camera (FC), all indicate that the majority of the surface composition of Vesta is consistent with the composition of the howardite, eucrite, and diogenite meteorites. The Rheasilvia region is richest in diogenite, consistent with the Rheasilvia-forming impact excavating material from deeper within Vesta. The presence of olivine within the Rheasilvia region would also be consistent with excavation of mantle material. However, olivine has only been detected in localized regions of the northern hemisphere, not within Rheasilvia. The origin of this olivine is currently unclear. Though olivine was expected by astronomers to have originated from Vesta's mantle prior to the arrival of the Dawn orbiter, the lack of olivine within the Rheasilvia and Veneneia impact basins complicates this view. Both impact basins excavated Vestian material down to 60–100 km (37–62 mi), far deeper than the expected thickness of ~30–40 km (19–25 mi) for Vesta's crust. Vesta's crust may be far thicker than expected or the violent impact events that created Rheasilvia and Veneneia may have mixed material enough to obscure olivine from observations. Alternatively, Dawn observations of olivine could instead be due to delivery by olivine-rich impactors, unrelated to Vesta's internal structure.

=== Features associated with volatiles ===
Pitted terrain has been observed in four craters on Vesta: Marcia, Cornelia, Numisia and Licinia. The formation of the pitted terrain is proposed to be degassing of impact-heated volatile-bearing material. Along with the pitted terrain, curvilinear gullies are found in Marcia and Cornelia craters. The curvilinear gullies end in lobate deposits, which are sometimes covered by pitted terrain, and are proposed to form by the transient flow of liquid water after buried deposits of ice were melted by the heat of the impacts. Hydrated materials have also been detected, many of which are associated with areas of dark material. Consequently, dark material is thought to be largely composed of carbonaceous chondrite, which was deposited on the surface by impacts. Carbonaceous chondrites are comparatively rich in mineralogically bound OH.

== Geology ==
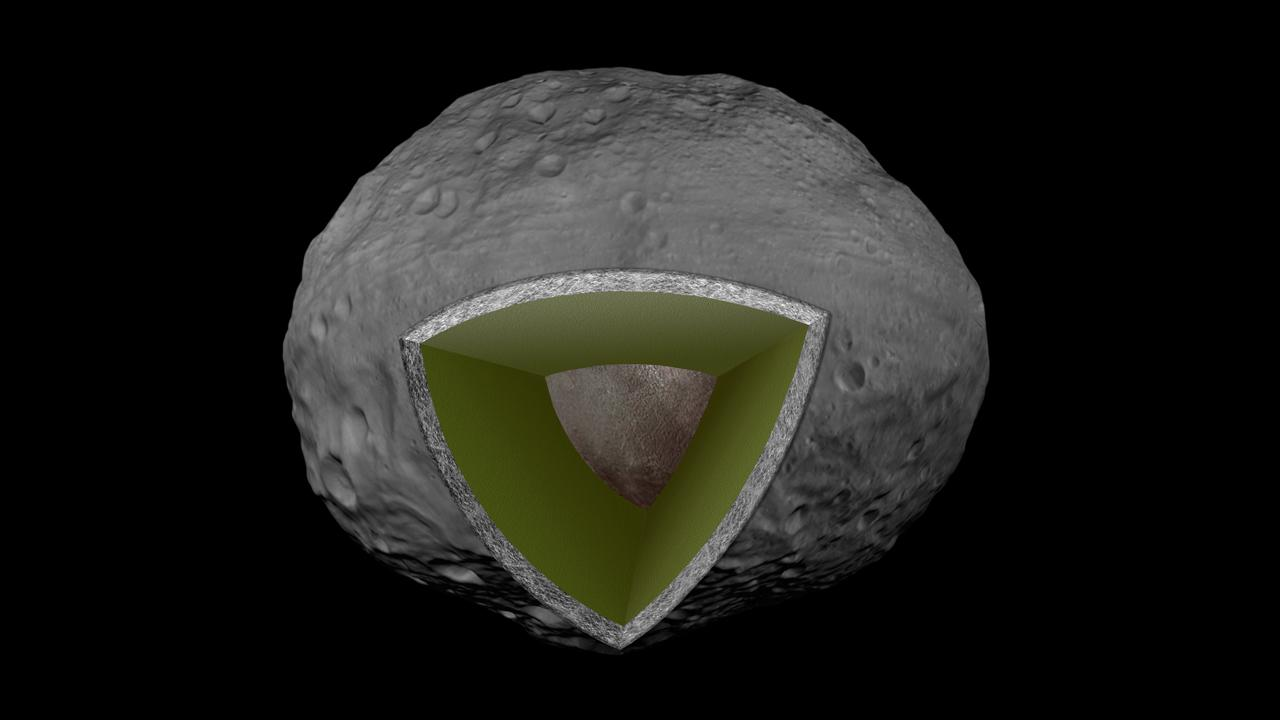
Cut-away schematic of Vesta's core, mantle, and crust

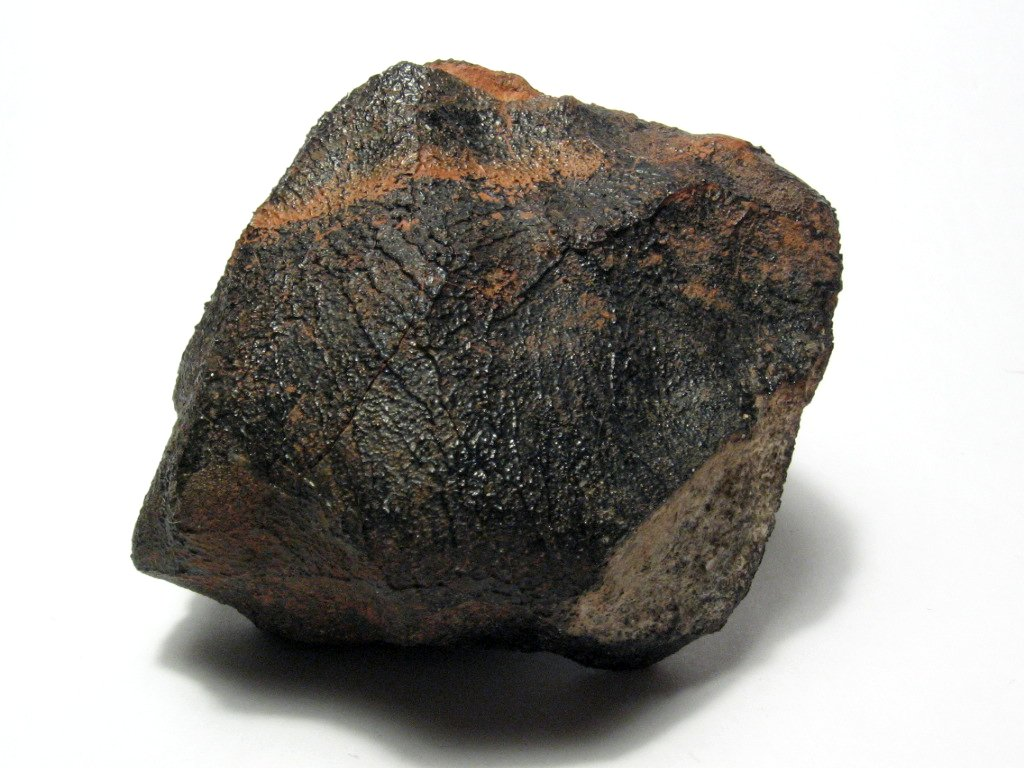
Eucrite meteorite

A large collection of potential samples from Vesta is accessible to scientists, in the form of over 1200 HED meteorites (Vestan achondrites), giving insight into Vesta's geologic history and structure. NASA Infrared Telescope Facility (NASA IRTF) studies of asteroid (237442) 1999 TA10 suggest that it originated from deeper within Vesta than the HED meteorites.

Vesta is thought to consist of a metallic iron–nickel core, variously estimated to be 90 km (56 mi) to 220 km (140 mi) in diameter, an overlying rocky olivine mantle, with a surface crust of similar composition to HED meteorites.

From the first appearance of calcium–aluminium-rich inclusions (the first solid matter in the Solar System, forming about 4.567 billion years ago), a likely time line is as follows:

Timeline of the evolution of Vesta
2–3 million years	Accretion completed
4–5 million years	Complete or almost complete melting due to radioactive decay of ^{26}Al, leading to separation of the metal core
6–7 million years	Progressive crystallization of a convecting molten mantle. Convection stopped when about 80% of the material had crystallized
Extrusion of the remaining molten material to form the crust, either as basaltic lavas in progressive eruptions, or possibly forming a short-lived magma ocean.
The deeper layers of the crust crystallize to form plutonic rocks, whereas older basalts are metamorphosed due to the pressure of newer surface layers.
Slow cooling of the interior

Vesta is the only known intact asteroid that has been resurfaced in this manner. Because of this, some scientists refer to Vesta as a protoplanet.

Composition of the Vestan crust (by depth)
A lithified regolith, the source of howardites and brecciated eucrites.
Basaltic lava flows, a source of non-cumulate eucrites.
Plutonic rocks consisting of pyroxene, pigeonite and plagioclase, the source of cumulate eucrites.
Plutonic rocks rich in orthopyroxene with large grain sizes, the source of diogenites.

On the basis of the sizes of V-type asteroids (thought to be pieces of Vesta's crust ejected during large impacts), and the depth of Rheasilvia crater (see below), the crust is thought to be roughly 10 kilometres (6 mi) thick. Findings from the Dawn spacecraft have found evidence that the troughs that wrap around Vesta could be graben formed by impact-induced faulting (see Troughs section above), meaning that Vesta has more complex geology than other asteroids. The impacts that created the Rheasilvia and Veneneia craters occurred when Vesta was no longer warm and plastic enough to return to an equilibrium shape, distorting its once rounded shape and prohibiting it from being classified as a dwarf planet today.

=== Regolith ===
Vesta's surface is covered by regolith distinct from that found on the Moon or asteroids such as Itokawa. This is because space weathering acts differently. Vesta's surface shows no significant trace of nanophase iron because the impact speeds on Vesta are too low to make rock melting and vaporization an appreciable process. Instead, regolith evolution is dominated by brecciation and subsequent mixing of bright and dark components. The dark component is probably due to the infall of carbonaceous material, whereas the bright component is the original Vesta basaltic soil.

== Fragments ==
Some small Solar System bodies are suspected to be fragments of Vesta caused by impacts. The Vestian asteroids and HED meteorites are examples. The V-type asteroid 1929 Kollaa has been determined to have a composition akin to cumulate eucrite meteorites, indicating its origin deep within Vesta's crust.

Vesta is currently one of only eight identified Solar System bodies of which we have physical samples, coming from a number of meteorites suspected to be Vestan fragments. It is estimated that 1 out of 16 meteorites originated from Vesta. The other identified Solar System samples are from Earth itself, meteorites from Mars, meteorites from the Moon, and samples returned from the Moon, the comet Wild 2, and the asteroids 25143 Itokawa, 162173 Ryugu, and 101955 Bennu. (Note: Note that 6 Hebe may be the parent body for H chondrites, one of the most common meteorite types.)

== Exploration ==
Animation of Dawn's trajectory from 27 September 2007 to 5 October 2018 Dawn · Earth · Mars · 4 Vesta · 1 Ceres

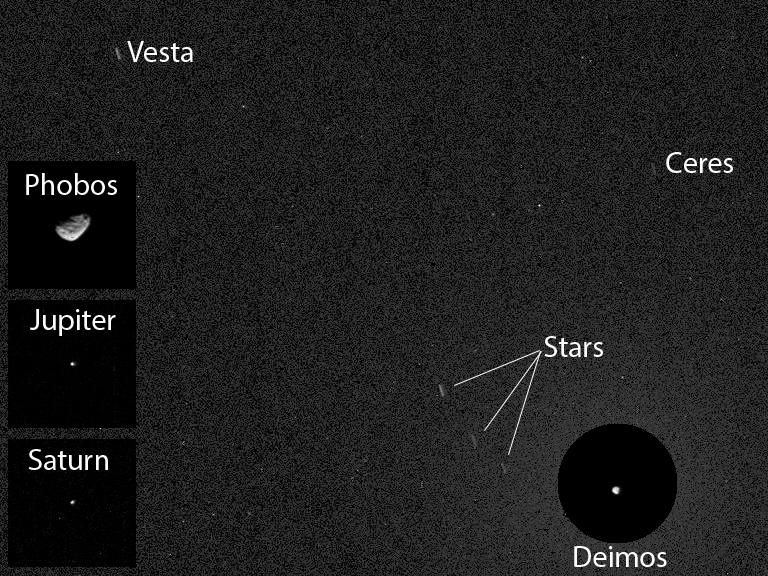
First image of asteroids (Ceres and Vesta) taken from Mars. The image was made by the Curiosity rover on 20 April 2014.

Animation of Dawn's trajectory around 4 Vesta from 15 July 2011 to 10 September 2012 Dawn · 4 Vesta

In 1981, a proposal for an asteroid mission was submitted to the European Space Agency (ESA). Named the Asteroidal Gravity Optical and Radar Analysis (AGORA), this spacecraft was to launch some time in 1990–1994 and perform two flybys of large asteroids. The preferred target for this mission was Vesta. AGORA would reach the asteroid belt either by a gravitational slingshot trajectory past Mars or by means of a small ion engine. However, the proposal was refused by the ESA. A joint NASA–ESA asteroid mission was then drawn up for a Multiple Asteroid Orbiter with Solar Electric Propulsion (MAOSEP), with one of the mission profiles including an orbit of Vesta. NASA indicated they were not interested in an asteroid mission. Instead, the ESA set up a technological study of a spacecraft with an ion drive. Other missions to the asteroid belt were proposed in the 1980s by France, Germany, Italy and the United States, but none were approved. Exploration of Vesta by fly-by and impacting penetrator was the second main target of the first plan of the multi-aimed Soviet Vesta mission, developed in cooperation with European countries for realisation in 1991–1994 but canceled due to the dissolution of the Soviet Union.

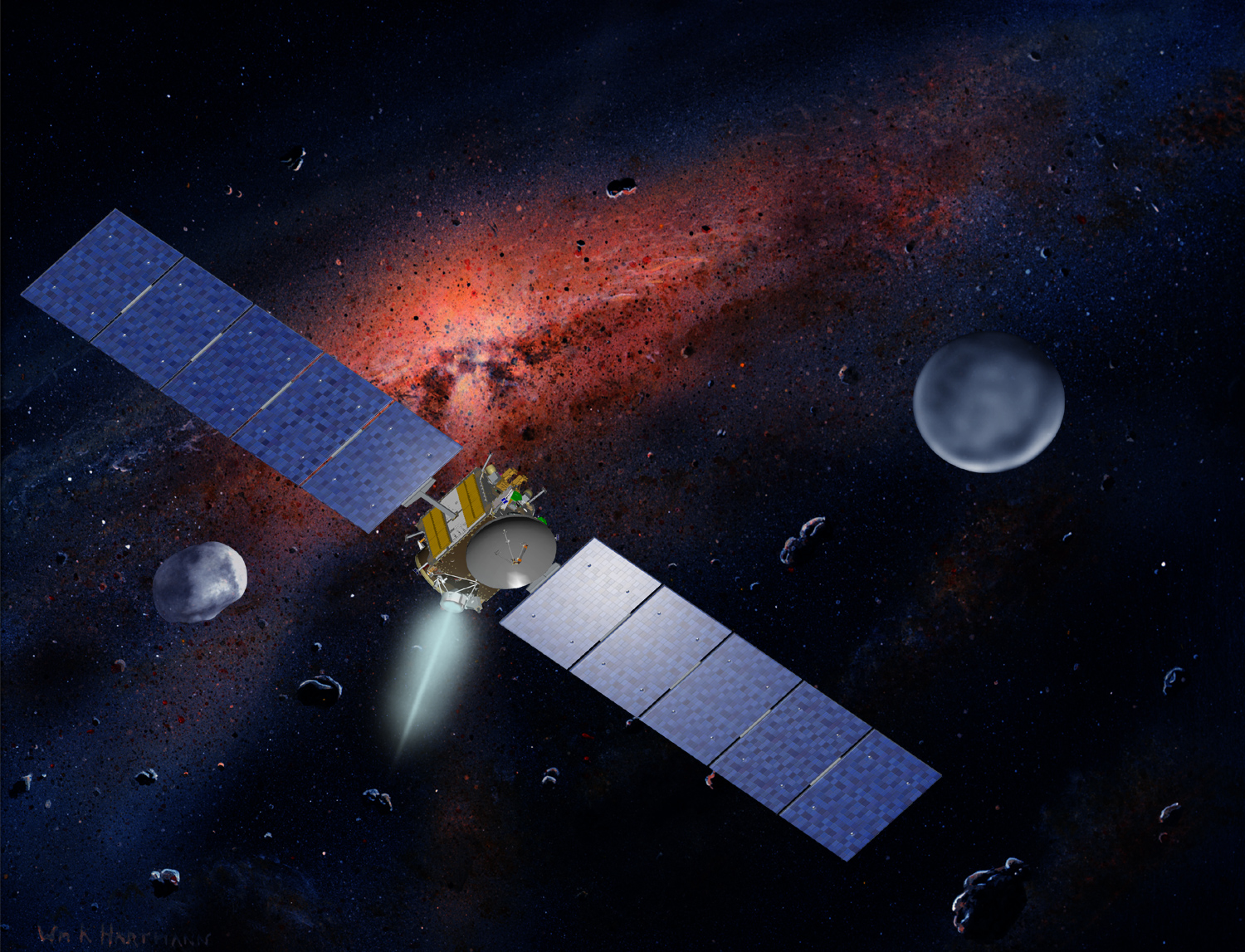
Artist's conception of Dawn orbiting Vesta

In the early 1990s, NASA initiated the Discovery Program, which was intended to be a series of low-cost scientific missions. In 1996, the program's study team recommended a mission to explore the asteroid belt using a spacecraft with an ion engine as a high priority. Funding for this program remained problematic for several years, but by 2004 the Dawn vehicle had passed its critical design review and construction proceeded.

It launched on 27 September 2007 as the first space mission to Vesta. On 3 May 2011, Dawn acquired its first targeting image 1.2 million kilometres (0.75×10^{6} mi) from Vesta. On 16 July 2011, NASA confirmed that it received telemetry from Dawn indicating that the spacecraft successfully entered Vesta's orbit. It was scheduled to orbit Vesta for one year, until July 2012. Dawn's arrival coincided with late summer in the southern hemisphere of Vesta, with the large crater at Vesta's south pole (Rheasilvia) in sunlight. Because a season on Vesta lasts eleven months, the northern hemisphere, including anticipated compression fractures opposite the crater, would become visible to Dawn's cameras before it left orbit. Dawn left orbit around Vesta on 4 September 2012 11:26 p.m. PDT to travel to Ceres.

NASA/DLR released imagery and summary information from a survey orbit, two high-altitude orbits (60–70 m/pixel) and a low-altitude mapping orbit (20 m/pixel), including digital terrain models, videos and atlases. Scientists also used Dawn to calculate Vesta's precise mass and gravity field. The subsequent determination of the J_{2} component yielded a core diameter estimate of about 220 km (140 mi) assuming a crustal density similar to that of the HED.

Dawn data can be accessed by the public at the UCLA website.

=== Observations from Earth orbit ===
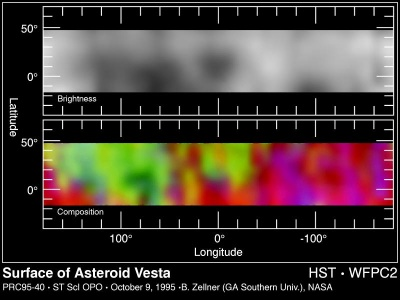
Albedo and spectral maps of 4 Vesta, as determined from Hubble Space Telescope images from November 1994

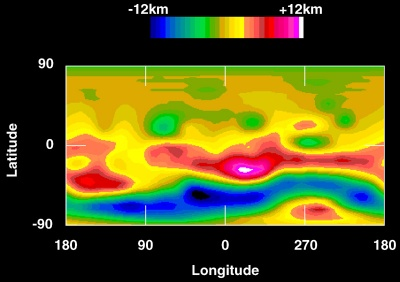
Elevation map of 4 Vesta, as determined from Hubble Space Telescope images of May 1996

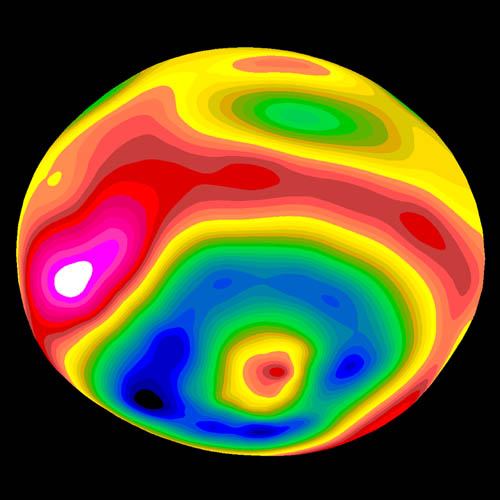
Elevation diagram of 4 Vesta (as determined from Hubble Space Telescope images of May 1996) viewed from the south-east, showing Rheasilvia crater at the south pole and Feralia Planitia near the equator

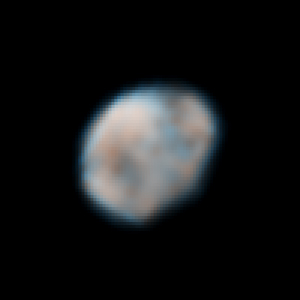
Vesta seen by the Hubble Space Telescope in May 2007

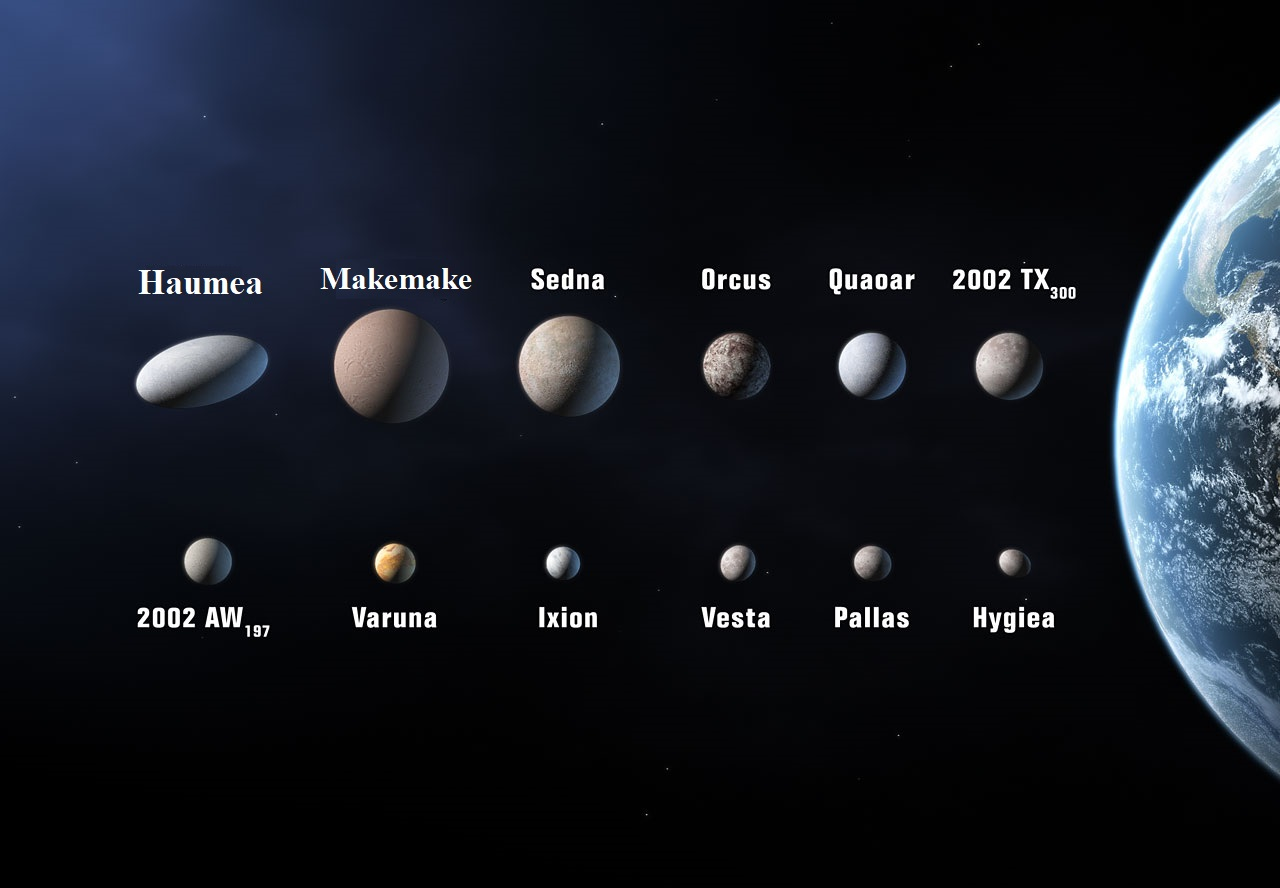
The 2006 IAU draft proposal on the definition of a planet listed Vesta as a candidate. Vesta is shown fourth from the left along the bottom row.

=== Observations from Dawn ===
Vesta comes into view as the Dawn spacecraft approaches and enters orbit:

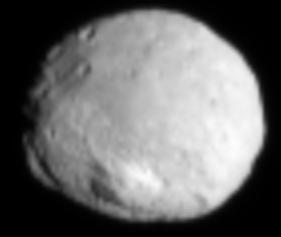
Vesta from 100,000 km
(1 July 2011)

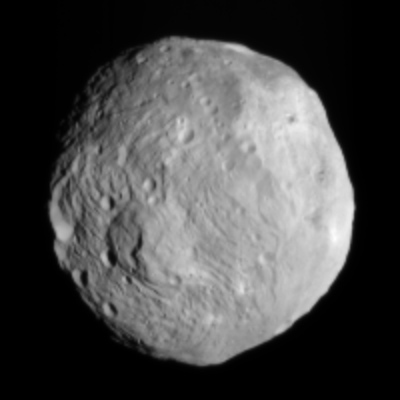
Vesta from 41,000 km
(9 July 2011)

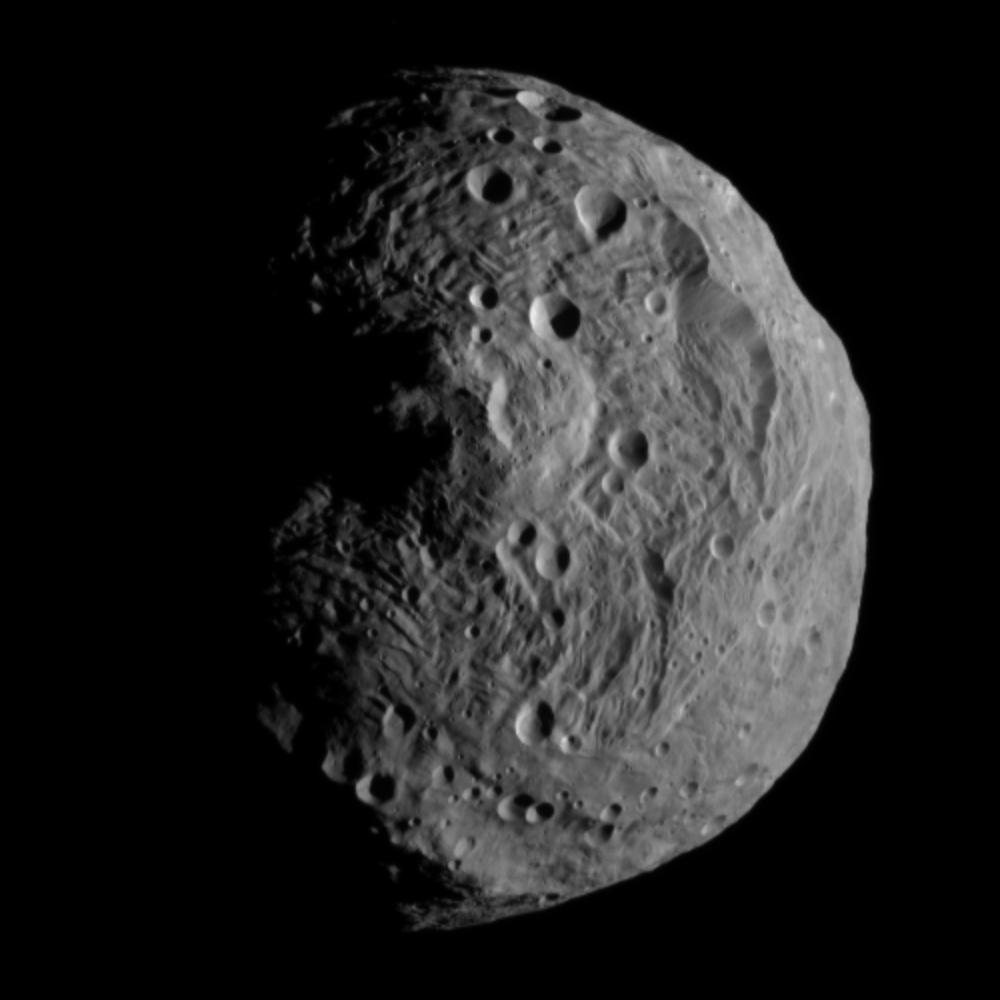
In orbit at 16,000 km
(17 July 2011)

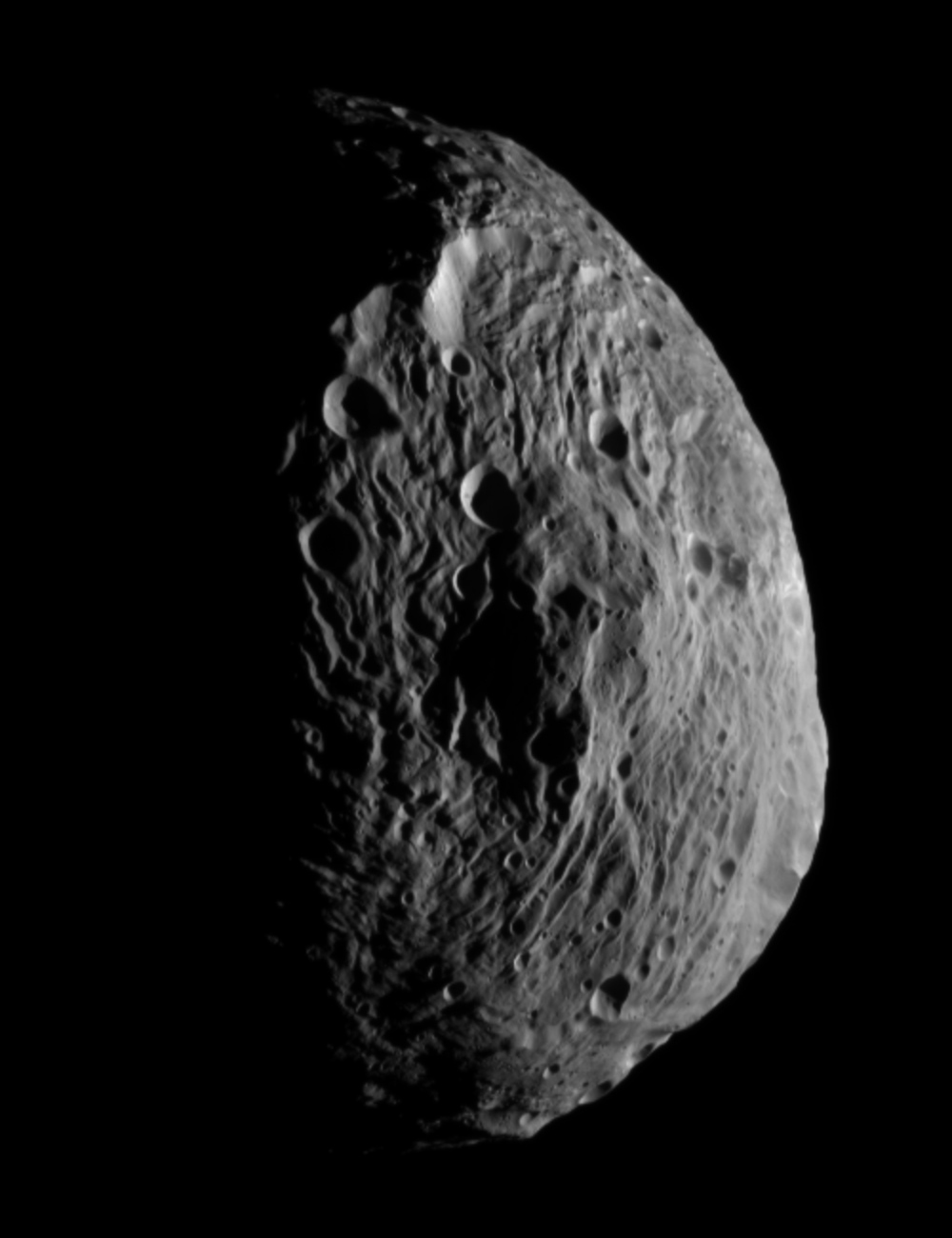
In orbit from 10,500 km
(18 July 2011)

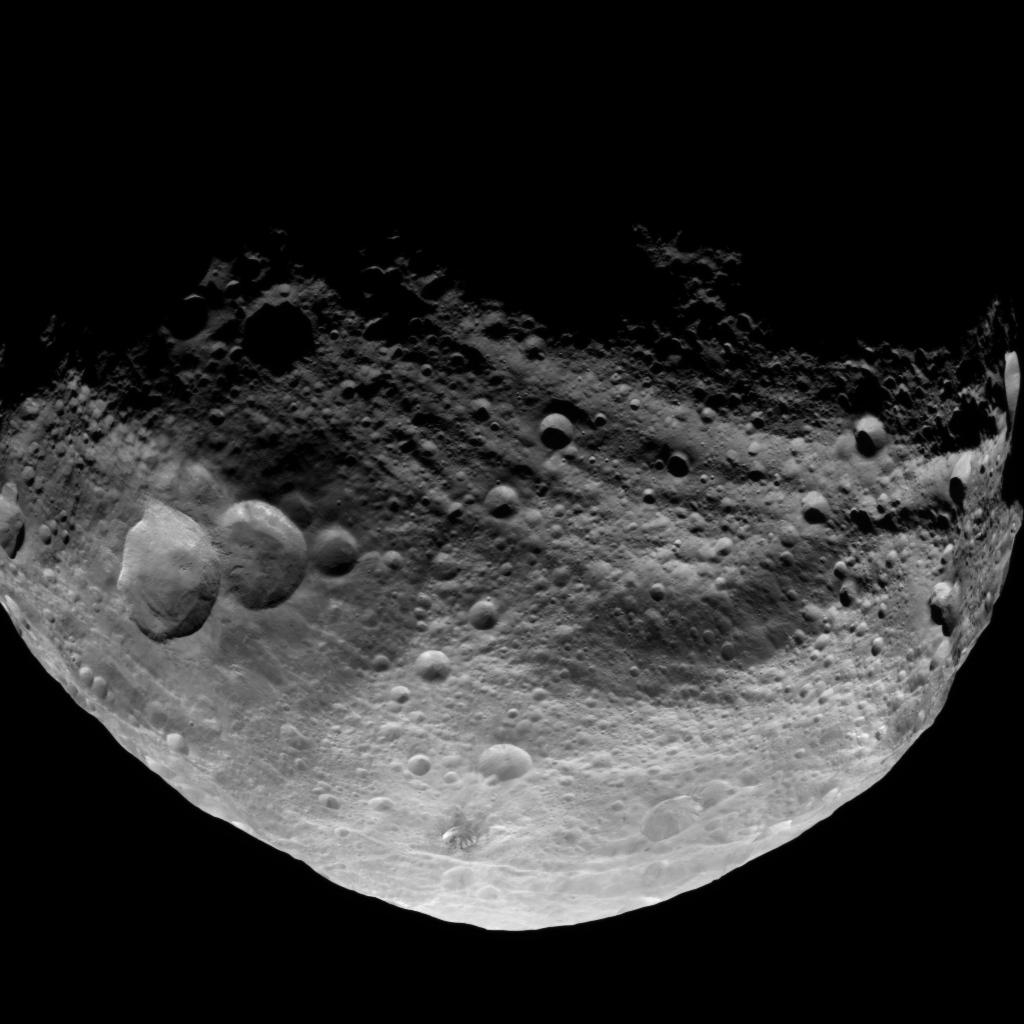
The northern hemisphere from 5,200 km
(23 July 2011)

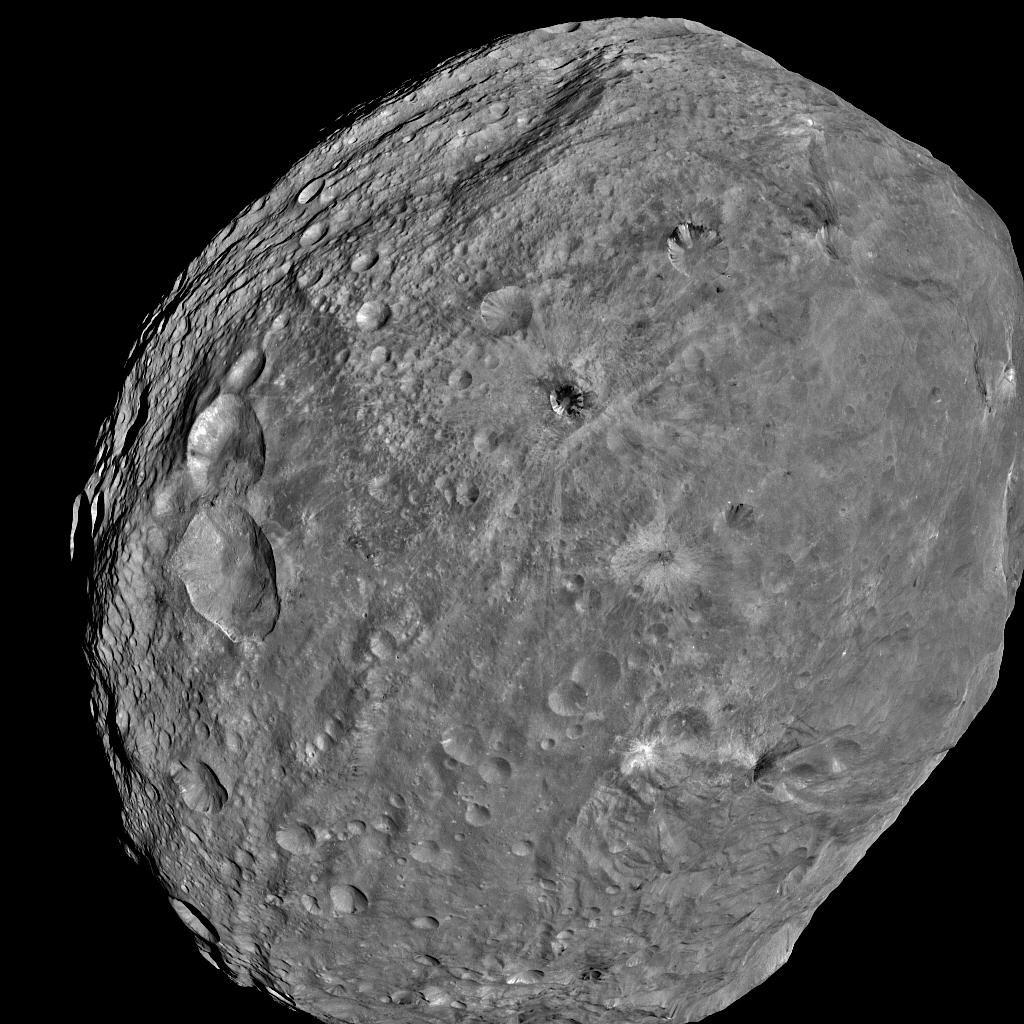
In orbit from 5,200 km
(24 July 2011)

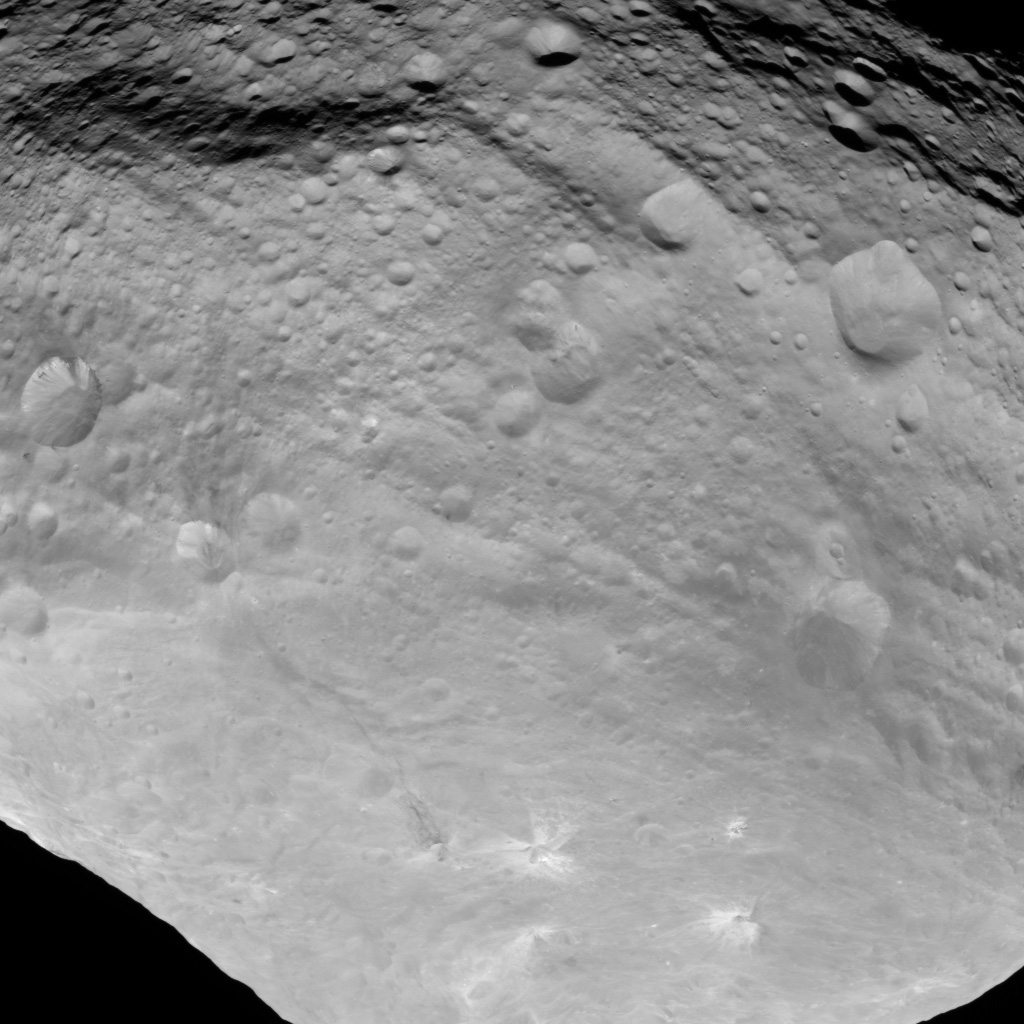
In orbit from 3,700 km
(31 July 2011)

Full rotation
(1 August 2011)

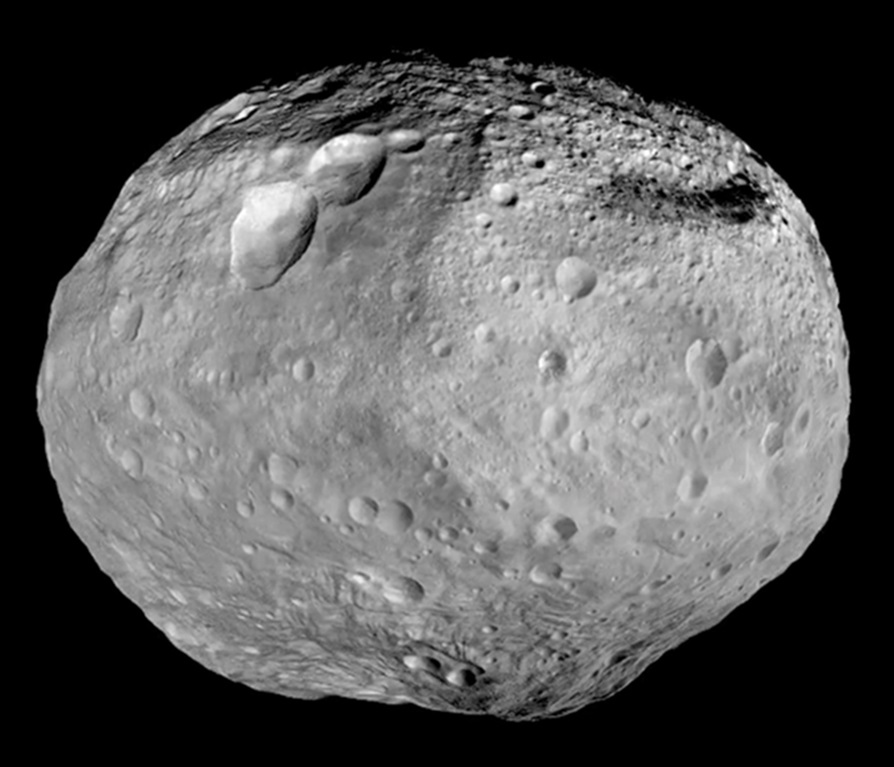
Composite greyscale image

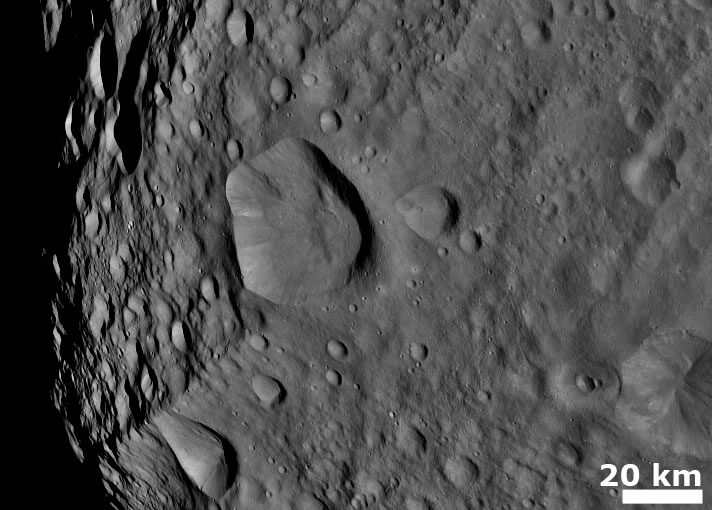
Cratered terrain with hills and ridges
(6 August 2011)

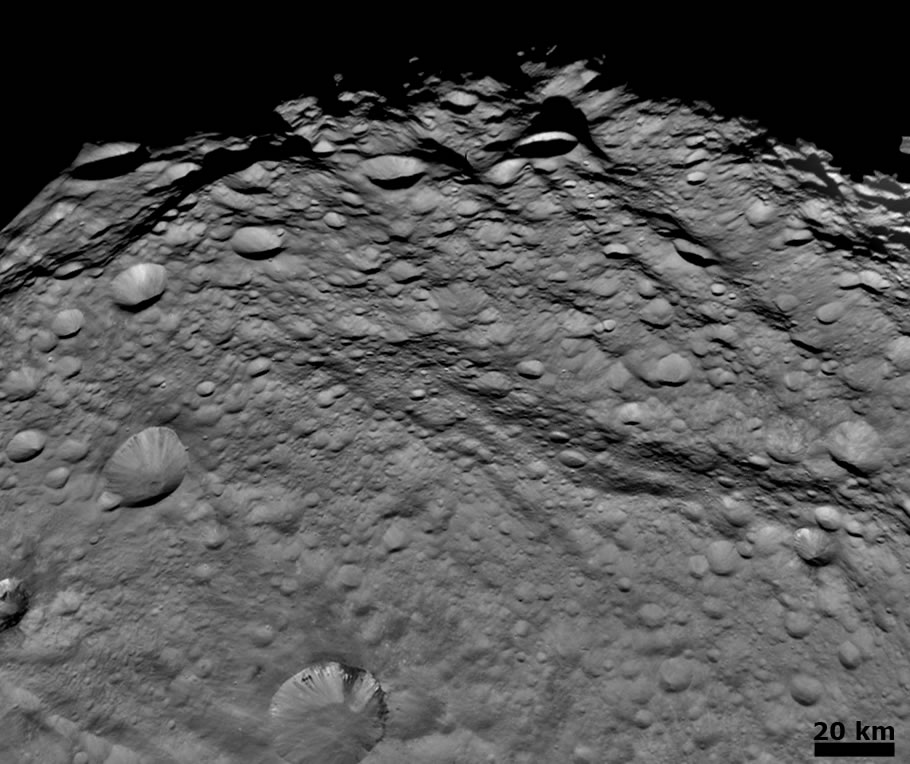
Densely cratered terrain near terminator
(6 August 2011)

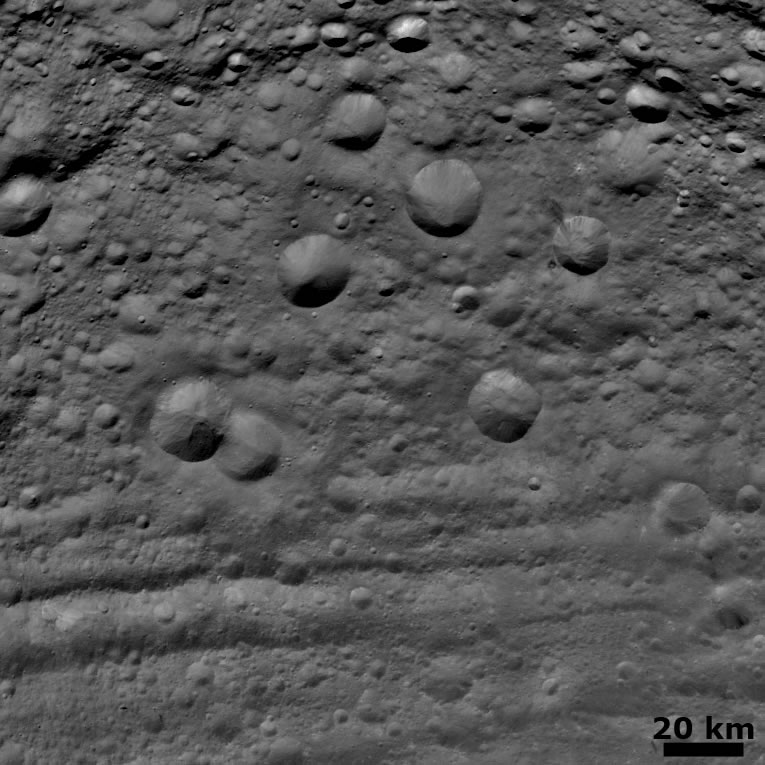
Vestan craters in various states of degradation, with troughs at bottom
(6 August 2011)

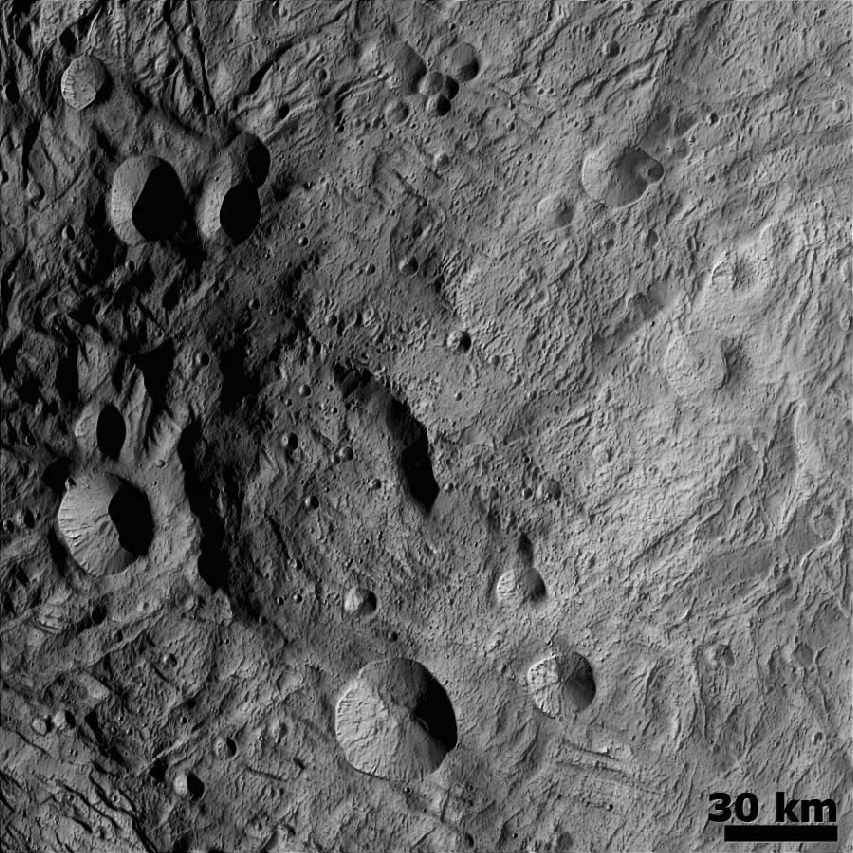
Hill shaded central mound at the south pole of Vesta
(2 February 2015)

==== True-color images ====
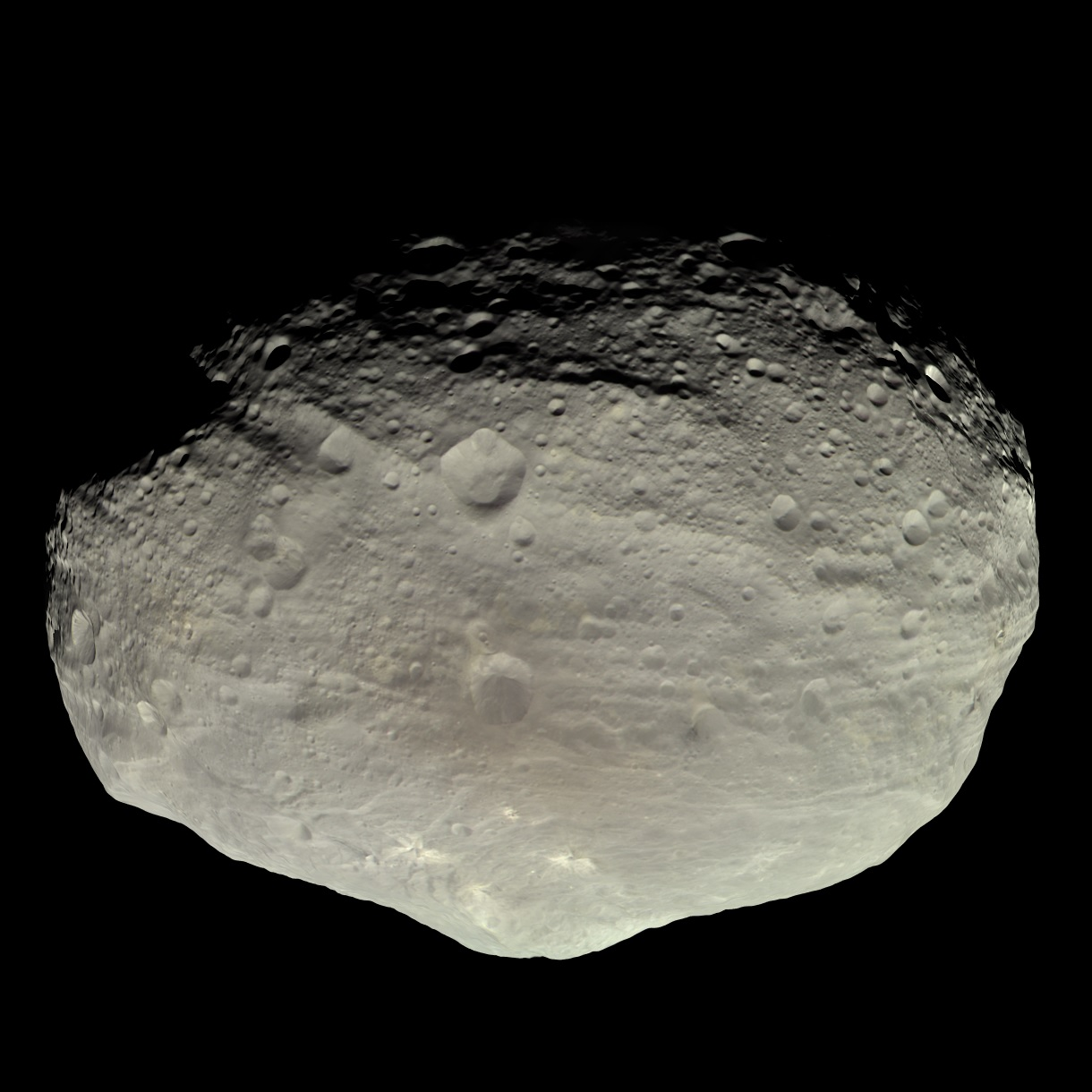

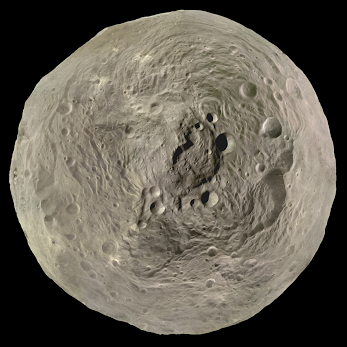

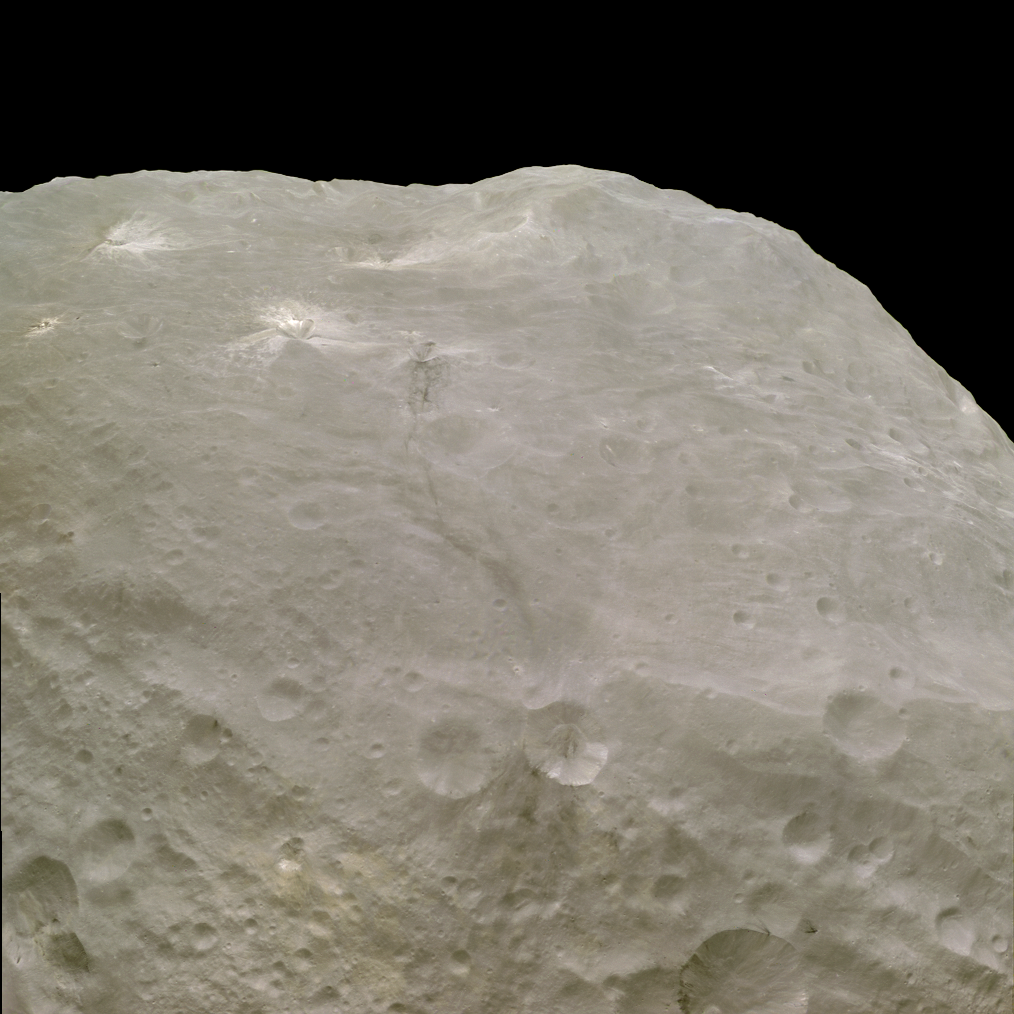

Detailed images retrieved during the high-altitude (60–70 m/pixel) and low-altitude (~20 m/pixel) mapping orbits are available on the Dawn Mission website of JPL/NASA.

== Visibility ==
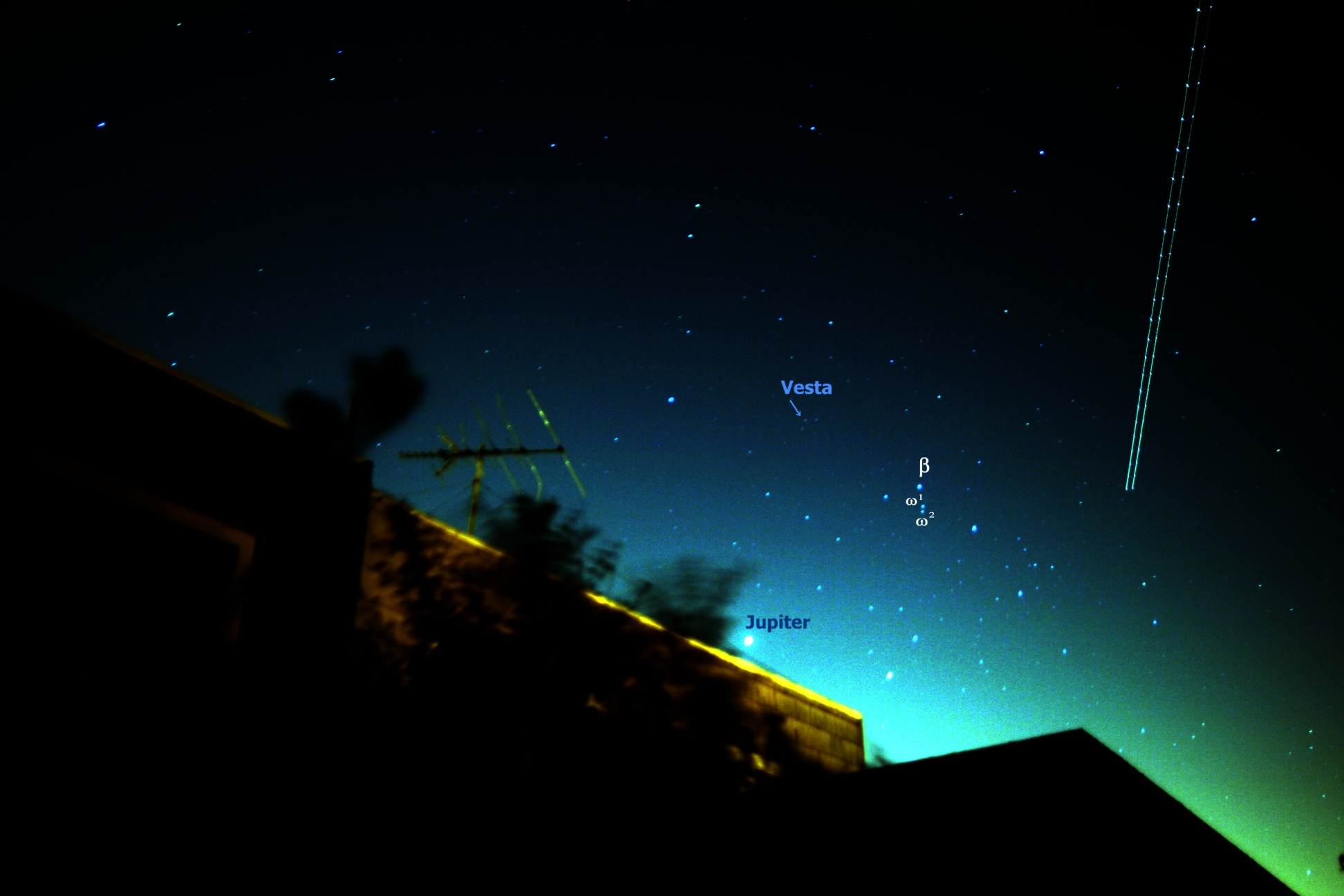
Annotated image from Earth's surface in June 2007 with (4) Vesta

Its size and unusually bright surface make Vesta the brightest asteroid, and it is occasionally visible to the naked eye from dark skies (without light pollution). In May and June 2007, Vesta reached a peak magnitude of +5.4, the brightest since 1989. At that time, opposition and perihelion were only a few weeks apart. It was brighter still at its 22 June 2018 opposition, reaching a magnitude of +5.3. Less favorable oppositions during late autumn 2008 in the Northern Hemisphere still had Vesta at a magnitude of from +6.5 to +7.3. Even when in conjunction with the Sun, Vesta will have a magnitude around +8.5; thus from a pollution-free sky it can be observed with binoculars even at elongations much smaller than near opposition.

=== 2010–2011 ===
In 2010, Vesta reached opposition in the constellation of Leo on the night of 17–18 February, at about magnitude 6.1, a brightness that makes it visible in binocular range but generally not for the naked eye. Under perfect dark sky conditions where all light pollution is absent it might be visible to an experienced observer without the use of a telescope or binoculars. Vesta came to opposition again on 5 August 2011, in the constellation of Capricornus at about magnitude 5.6.

=== 2012–2013 ===
Vesta was at opposition again on 9 December 2012. According to Sky and Telescope magazine, this year Vesta came within about 6 degrees of 1 Ceres during the winter of 2012 and spring 2013. Vesta orbits the Sun in 3.63 years and Ceres in 4.6 years, so every 17.4 years Vesta overtakes Ceres (the previous overtaking was in April 1996). On 1 December 2012, Vesta had a magnitude of 6.6, but it had decreased to 8.4 by 1 May 2013.

=== 2014 ===
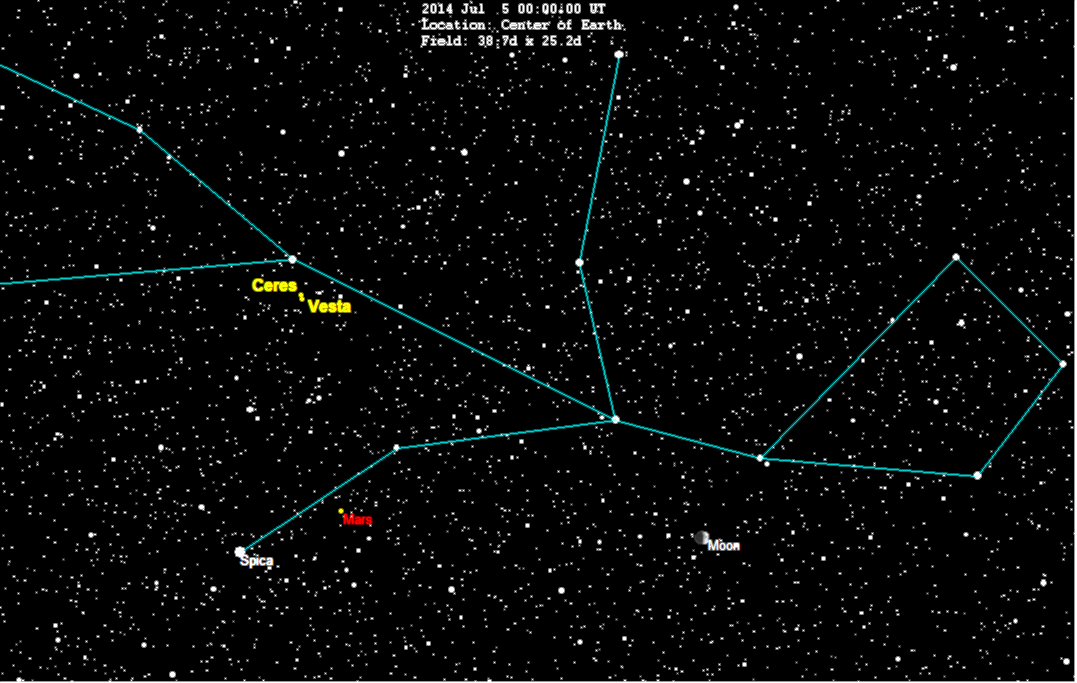
Conjunction of Ceres and Vesta near the star Gamma Virginis on 5 July 2014 in the Constellation of Virgo.

Ceres and Vesta came within one degree of each other in the night sky in July 2014.

== See also ==
- 3103 Eger
- 3551 Verenia
- 3908 Nyx
- 4055 Magellan
- Asteroids in fiction
- Diogenite
- Eucrite
- List of former planets
- Howardite
- Vesta family (vestoids)
- List of tallest mountains in the Solar System

== Bibliography ==
- The Dawn Mission to Minor Planets 4 Vesta and 1 Ceres, Christopher T. Russell and Carol A. Raymond (Editors), Springer (2011), ISBN 978-1-4614-4903-4
- Keil, K.; Geological History of Asteroid 4 Vesta: The Smallest Terrestrial Planet in Asteroids III, William Bottke, Alberto Cellino, Paolo Paolicchi, and Richard P. Binzel (editors), University of Arizona Press (2002), ISBN 0-8165-2281-2
