= HED meteorite =

Group of achondrite meteorites

- — Clan —
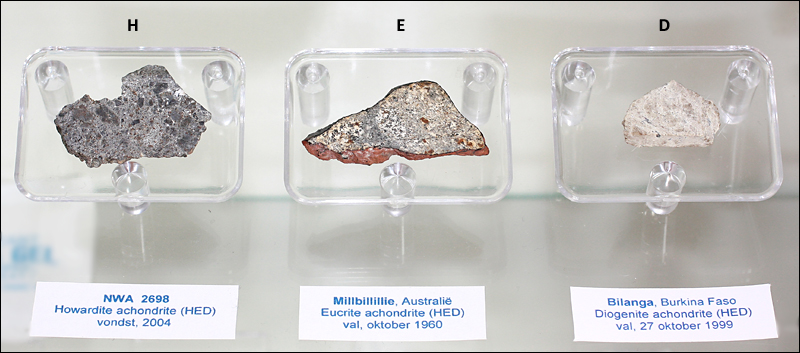
- HED meteorites: NWA 2698 (howardite), Millbillillie (eucrite), Bilanga (diogenite)
- Type: Stony
- Class: Achondrite
- Subgroups: Howardite; Eucrite; Diogenite
- Parent body: Vesta
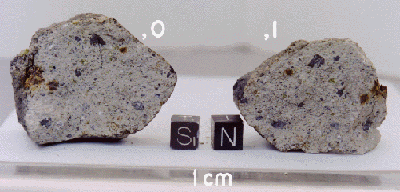
- QUE 94200, howardite

HED meteorites are a clan (subgroup) of achondrite meteorites. HED stands for "howardite–eucrite–diogenite". These achondrites came from a differentiated parent body and experienced extensive igneous processing not much different from the magmatic rocks found on Earth and for this reason they closely resemble terrestrial igneous rocks.

== Classification ==
HED meteorites are broadly divided into:

- Howardites
- Eucrites
- Diogenites

Several subgroups of both eucrites and diogenites have been found.

The HED meteorites account for about 5% of all falls, which is about 60% of all achondrites.

== Origin ==
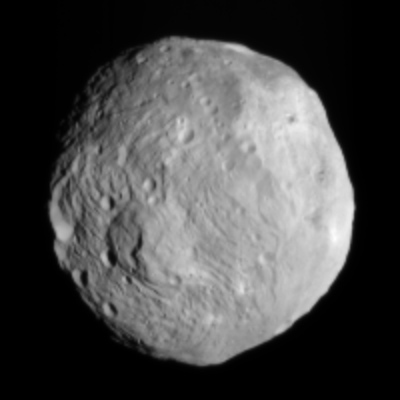
The asteroid Vesta

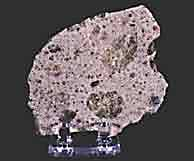
Johnstown, diogenite

No matter their composition, all these types of meteorite are thought to have originated in the crust of the asteroid Vesta. According to this theory, the differences of composition are due to their ejection at different moments in the geologic history of Vesta. Their crystallization ages have been determined to be between 4.43 and 4.55 billion years from radioisotope ratios. HED meteorites are differentiated meteorites, which were created by igneous processes in the crust of their parent asteroid.

It is thought that the method of transport from Vesta to Earth is as follows:

1. An impact on Vesta ejected debris, creating small (10 kilometres (6.2 mi) diameter or less) V-type asteroids. Either the asteroidal chunks were ejected as such, or were formed from smaller debris. Some of these small asteroids formed the Vesta family, while others were scattered somewhat further. This event is thought to have happened less than 1 billion years ago. There is an enormous impact crater on Vesta covering much of the southern hemisphere which is the best candidate for the site of this impact. The amount of rock that was excavated there is many times more than enough to account for all known V-type asteroids.
2. Some of the more far-flung asteroid debris ended up in the 3:1 Kirkwood gap. This is an unstable region due to strong perturbations by Jupiter, and asteroids that end up here get ejected into very different orbits on a timescale of about 100 million years. Some of these bodies are perturbed into near-Earth orbits forming the small V-type near-Earth asteroids such as e.g. 3551 Verenia, 3908 Nyx, or 4055 Magellan.
3. Later, smaller impacts on these near-Earth objects dislodged rock-sized meteorites, some of which later struck Earth. On the basis of cosmic ray exposure measurements, it is thought that most HED meteorites arose from several distinct impact events of this kind, and spent from about 6 million to 73 million years in space before striking the Earth.

== See also ==
- Glossary of meteoritics
