= Diogenite =

Group of achondritic stony meteorites that originate from the asteroid 4 Vesta

- — Group —
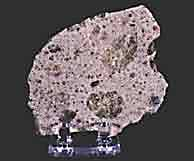
- The Johnstown Diogenite.
- Type: Achondrite
- Structural classification: Igneous rocks of plutonic origin
- Class: Asteroidal achondrite
- Clan: HED
- Parent body: 4 Vesta
- Composition: Primarily magnesium-rich orthopyroxene, a little plagioclase & olivine
- Total known specimens: ~40
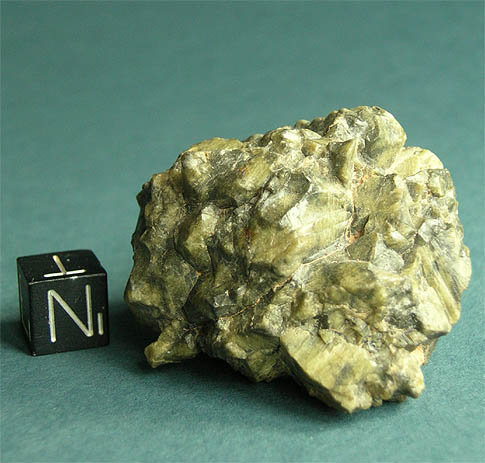
- Tatahouine, diogenite

Diogenites are a group of the HED meteorite clan, a type of achondritic stony meteorites.

== Origin and composition ==
Diogenites are currently believed to originate from deep within the crust of the asteroid 4 Vesta, and as such are part of the HED meteorite clan. There are about 40 distinct members known.

Diogenites are composed of igneous rocks of plutonic origin, having solidified slowly enough deep within Vesta's crust to form crystals which are larger than in the eucrites. These crystals are primarily magnesium-rich orthopyroxene, with small amounts of plagioclase and olivine.

== Name ==
Diogenites are named for Diogenes of Apollonia, an ancient Greek philosopher who was the first to suggest an outer space origin for meteorites.

== See also ==
- Glossary of meteoritics
- Vesta family
