= Eucrite =

Achondritic stony meteorite

- — Group —
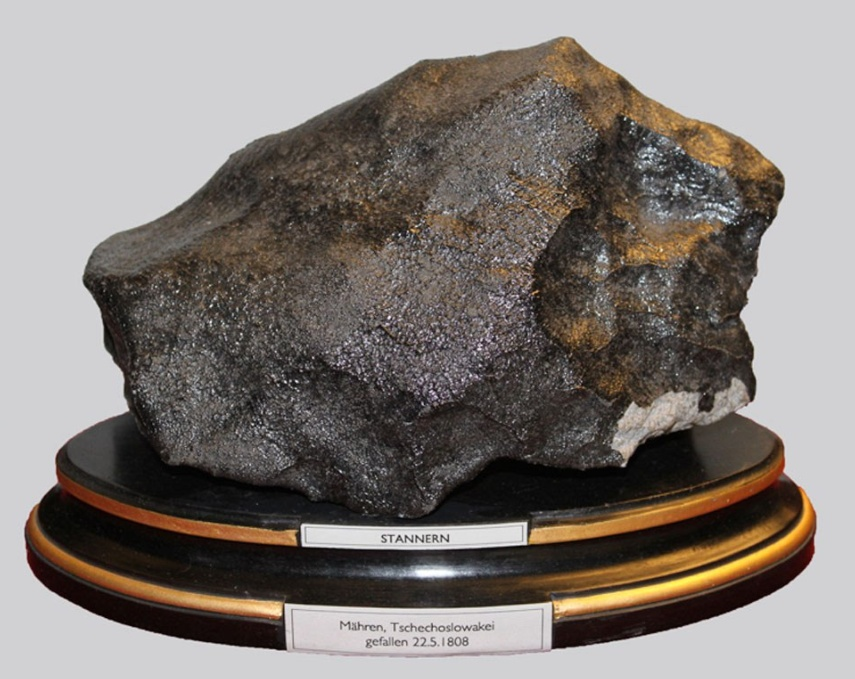
- Stannern eucrite, found in the Czech Republic.
- Compositional type: Stony
- Type: Achondrite
- Class: Asteroidal achondrite
- Clan: HED meteorite
- Subgroups: Non-cumulate eucrites; Main series eucrites; Stannern trend eucrites; Nuevo Laredo trend eucrites; Cumulate eucrites; Polymict eucrites; Brecciated eucrites; Eucrite monomict breccia; Eucrite polymict breccia; Eucrite-melt breccia
- Parent body: 4 Vesta and others
- Composition: Basaltic rock, mostly Calcium-poor pyroxene, pigeonite, and Calcium-rich plagioclase (anorthite)
- Total known specimens: >100
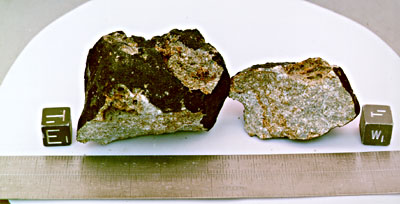
- GRA98033 a brecciated eucrite about 5 cm across, found in the Graves Nunataks region of Antarctica.

Eucrites are achondritic stony meteorites, many of which originate from the surface of the asteroid 4 Vesta and are part of the HED meteorite clan. They are the most common achondrite group with over 100 meteorites found.

Eucrites consist of basaltic rock from the crust of 4 Vesta or a similar parent body. They are mostly composed of calcium-poor pyroxene, pigeonite, and calcium-rich plagioclase (anorthite).

Based on differences of chemical composition and features of the component crystals, they are subdivided into several groups:

- Non-cumulate eucrites are the most common variety and can be subdivided further:
  - Main series eucrites formed near the surface and are mostly regolith breccias lithified under the pressure of overlying newer deposits.
  - Stannern trend eucrites are a rare variety.
  - Nuevo Laredo trend eucrites are thought to come from deeper layers of 4 Vesta's crust, and are a transition group towards the cumulate eucrites.
- Cumulate eucrites are rare types with oriented crystals, thought to have solidified in magma chambers deep within 4 Vesta's crust.
- Polymict eucrites are regolith breccias consisting of mostly eucrite fragments and less than one part in ten of diogenite. They are less common.

== Etymology ==
Eucrites get their name from the Greek word eukritos meaning "easily distinguished". This refers to the silicate minerals in them, which can be easily distinguished because of their relatively large grain size.

Eucrite is also a now obsolete term for bytownite-gabbro, an igneous rock formed in the Earth's crust. The term was used as a rock type name for some of the Paleogene igneous rocks of Scotland.

== See also ==
- Glossary of meteoritics
- Shergottite
- Tholeiitic basalt
