= List of minor planets: 780001–781000 =

The following is a partial list of minor planets, running from minor-planet number 780001 through 781000, inclusive. The primary data for this and other partial lists is based on JPL's "Small-Body Orbital Elements" and data available from the Minor Planet Center. Critical list information is also provided by the MPC, unless otherwise specified from Lowell Observatory. A detailed description of the table's columns and additional sources are given on the main page including a complete list of every page in this series, and a statistical break-up on the dynamical classification of minor planets.

Also see the summary list of all named bodies in numerical and alphabetical order, and the corresponding naming citations for the number range of this particular list. New namings may only be added to this list after official publication, as the preannouncement of names is condemned by the Working Group for Small Bodies Nomenclature of the International Astronomical Union.

Near-Earth obj.	MBA (inner)	MBA (outer)	Centaur
Mars-crosser	MBA (middle)	Jupiter trojan	Trans-Neptunian obj.
Unclassified

== 780001–780100 ==
Designation			Discovery			Properties		Ref
Permanent	Provisional	Named after	Date	Site	Discoverer(s)	Category	Diam.	Ref
780001	2012 EJ_{6}	—	February 27, 2012	Kitt Peak	Spacewatch	EUN	700 m	MPC · JPL
780002	2012 ET_{6}	—	March 13, 2012	Mount Lemmon	Mount Lemmon Survey	·	1.9 km	MPC · JPL
780003	2012 ET_{8}	—	March 13, 2012	Mount Lemmon	Mount Lemmon Survey	·	1.2 km	MPC · JPL
780004	2012 EE_{12}	—	March 13, 2012	Mount Lemmon	Mount Lemmon Survey	KOR	1.1 km	MPC · JPL
780005	2012 EE_{13}	—	March 15, 2012	Mount Lemmon	Mount Lemmon Survey	·	1.1 km	MPC · JPL
780006	2012 EO_{19}	—	March 4, 2012	Mount Lemmon	Mount Lemmon Survey	·	1.0 km	MPC · JPL
780007	2012 ER_{19}	—	March 14, 2012	Kitt Peak	Spacewatch	·	1.1 km	MPC · JPL
780008	2012 EB_{21}	—	March 15, 2012	Mount Lemmon	Mount Lemmon Survey	·	1.3 km	MPC · JPL
780009	2012 EK_{21}	—	September 20, 2014	Haleakala	Pan-STARRS 1	·	1.4 km	MPC · JPL
780010	2012 EF_{22}	—	March 1, 2012	Kitt Peak	Spacewatch	·	940 m	MPC · JPL
780011	2012 EY_{22}	—	March 15, 2012	Mount Lemmon	Mount Lemmon Survey	·	1.3 km	MPC · JPL
780012	2012 ET_{24}	—	March 15, 2012	Mount Lemmon	Mount Lemmon Survey	·	1.3 km	MPC · JPL
780013	2012 EU_{24}	—	March 4, 2012	Mount Lemmon	Mount Lemmon Survey	·	1.3 km	MPC · JPL
780014	2012 EW_{25}	—	March 1, 2012	Mount Lemmon	Mount Lemmon Survey	·	1.1 km	MPC · JPL
780015	2012 EZ_{26}	—	March 15, 2012	Mount Lemmon	Mount Lemmon Survey	·	1.2 km	MPC · JPL
780016	2012 EW_{27}	—	March 15, 2012	Mount Lemmon	Mount Lemmon Survey	·	940 m	MPC · JPL
780017	2012 EZ_{28}	—	March 13, 2012	Mount Lemmon	Mount Lemmon Survey	HNS	870 m	MPC · JPL
780018	2012 EB_{29}	—	March 14, 2012	Mount Lemmon	Mount Lemmon Survey	·	1.1 km	MPC · JPL
780019	2012 ED_{29}	—	March 15, 2012	Mount Lemmon	Mount Lemmon Survey	·	1.0 km	MPC · JPL
780020	2012 EO_{29}	—	March 4, 2012	Mount Lemmon	Mount Lemmon Survey	·	1.0 km	MPC · JPL
780021	2012 ER_{32}	—	March 13, 2012	Mount Lemmon	Mount Lemmon Survey	HNS	820 m	MPC · JPL
780022	2012 ES_{32}	—	March 1, 2012	Mount Lemmon	Mount Lemmon Survey	·	1.2 km	MPC · JPL
780023	2012 EZ_{32}	—	March 15, 2012	Kitt Peak	Spacewatch	·	1.4 km	MPC · JPL
780024	2012 EP_{34}	—	March 13, 2012	Mount Lemmon	Mount Lemmon Survey	·	1.3 km	MPC · JPL
780025	2012 FB_{2}	—	December 25, 2005	Kitt Peak	Spacewatch	·	2.3 km	MPC · JPL
780026	2012 FK_{3}	—	March 15, 2012	Mount Lemmon	Mount Lemmon Survey	·	2.3 km	MPC · JPL
780027	2012 FR_{9}	—	March 15, 2012	Mount Lemmon	Mount Lemmon Survey	·	1.0 km	MPC · JPL
780028	2012 FE_{12}	—	March 16, 2012	Kitt Peak	Spacewatch	·	1.1 km	MPC · JPL
780029	2012 FY_{12}	—	February 27, 2012	Haleakala	Pan-STARRS 1	·	2.0 km	MPC · JPL
780030	2012 FZ_{16}	—	September 22, 2009	Mount Lemmon	Mount Lemmon Survey	·	1.5 km	MPC · JPL
780031	2012 FX_{18}	—	March 16, 2012	Kitt Peak	Spacewatch	·	1.5 km	MPC · JPL
780032	2012 FF_{24}	—	March 13, 2012	Mount Lemmon	Mount Lemmon Survey	·	1.4 km	MPC · JPL
780033	2012 FZ_{34}	—	March 24, 2012	Mount Lemmon	Mount Lemmon Survey	·	1.1 km	MPC · JPL
780034	2012 FK_{38}	—	April 23, 2007	Mount Lemmon	Mount Lemmon Survey	·	1.7 km	MPC · JPL
780035	2012 FD_{41}	—	March 17, 2012	Mount Lemmon	Mount Lemmon Survey	·	1.3 km	MPC · JPL
780036	2012 FU_{42}	—	March 23, 2012	Mount Lemmon	Mount Lemmon Survey	·	1.0 km	MPC · JPL
780037	2012 FE_{44}	—	March 23, 2012	Mount Lemmon	Mount Lemmon Survey	·	1.1 km	MPC · JPL
780038	2012 FY_{46}	—	February 26, 2012	Kitt Peak	Spacewatch	·	1.2 km	MPC · JPL
780039	2012 FY_{47}	—	September 21, 2009	Mount Lemmon	Mount Lemmon Survey	·	1.2 km	MPC · JPL
780040	2012 FZ_{48}	—	February 28, 2012	Haleakala	Pan-STARRS 1	·	1.3 km	MPC · JPL
780041	2012 FO_{50}	—	March 24, 2012	Mount Lemmon	Mount Lemmon Survey	·	1.1 km	MPC · JPL
780042	2012 FM_{51}	—	March 24, 2012	Mount Lemmon	Mount Lemmon Survey	·	1.4 km	MPC · JPL
780043	2012 FN_{51}	—	February 28, 2012	Haleakala	Pan-STARRS 1	·	1.2 km	MPC · JPL
780044	2012 FE_{55}	—	March 24, 2012	Mount Lemmon	Mount Lemmon Survey	·	1.3 km	MPC · JPL
780045	2012 FQ_{55}	—	December 9, 2010	Mount Lemmon	Mount Lemmon Survey	·	1.3 km	MPC · JPL
780046	2012 FX_{59}	—	March 27, 2012	Mount Lemmon	Mount Lemmon Survey	·	1.3 km	MPC · JPL
780047	2012 FY_{59}	—	March 27, 2012	Mount Lemmon	Mount Lemmon Survey	HNS	760 m	MPC · JPL
780048	2012 FA_{63}	—	March 22, 2012	Mount Lemmon	Mount Lemmon Survey	·	1.5 km	MPC · JPL
780049	2012 FD_{64}	—	February 28, 2012	Haleakala	Pan-STARRS 1	·	1.6 km	MPC · JPL
780050	2012 FL_{64}	—	February 28, 2012	Haleakala	Pan-STARRS 1	·	1.2 km	MPC · JPL
780051	2012 FE_{65}	—	February 26, 2012	Kitt Peak	Spacewatch	·	1.0 km	MPC · JPL
780052	2012 FD_{70}	—	March 17, 2012	Mount Lemmon	Mount Lemmon Survey	DOR	1.8 km	MPC · JPL
780053	2012 FV_{70}	—	March 30, 2012	Mount Lemmon	Mount Lemmon Survey	·	1.8 km	MPC · JPL
780054	2012 FG_{74}	—	February 22, 2012	Kitt Peak	Spacewatch	·	1.3 km	MPC · JPL
780055	2012 FU_{77}	—	February 27, 2012	Haleakala	Pan-STARRS 1	·	1.5 km	MPC · JPL
780056	2012 FH_{80}	—	March 16, 2012	Kitt Peak	Spacewatch	·	1.1 km	MPC · JPL
780057	2012 FM_{81}	—	February 23, 2012	Mount Lemmon	Mount Lemmon Survey	·	1.0 km	MPC · JPL
780058	2012 FQ_{85}	—	March 16, 2012	Kitt Peak	Spacewatch	·	1.2 km	MPC · JPL
780059	2012 FN_{86}	—	March 29, 2012	Kitt Peak	Spacewatch	EUN	790 m	MPC · JPL
780060	2012 FY_{86}	—	March 17, 2012	Mount Lemmon	Mount Lemmon Survey	·	1.6 km	MPC · JPL
780061	2012 FM_{89}	—	December 13, 2015	Haleakala	Pan-STARRS 1	HNS	750 m	MPC · JPL
780062	2012 FA_{91}	—	March 16, 2012	Haleakala	Pan-STARRS 1	·	1.2 km	MPC · JPL
780063	2012 FQ_{93}	—	March 25, 2012	Mount Lemmon	Mount Lemmon Survey	·	1.6 km	MPC · JPL
780064	2012 FS_{93}	—	November 26, 2014	Haleakala	Pan-STARRS 1	·	1.5 km	MPC · JPL
780065	2012 FG_{94}	—	March 15, 2012	Piszkéstető	K. Sárneczky	·	1.3 km	MPC · JPL
780066	2012 FF_{95}	—	June 30, 2013	Haleakala	Pan-STARRS 1	·	1.3 km	MPC · JPL
780067	2012 FM_{96}	—	December 4, 2015	Haleakala	Pan-STARRS 1	·	2.0 km	MPC · JPL
780068	2012 FA_{98}	—	March 25, 2012	Mount Lemmon	Mount Lemmon Survey	·	980 m	MPC · JPL
780069	2012 FL_{98}	—	July 30, 2014	Haleakala	Pan-STARRS 1	·	2.2 km	MPC · JPL
780070	2012 FX_{98}	—	March 29, 2012	Kitt Peak	Spacewatch	·	1.1 km	MPC · JPL
780071	2012 FF_{99}	—	March 17, 2012	Mount Lemmon	Mount Lemmon Survey	EOS	1.2 km	MPC · JPL
780072	2012 FO_{101}	—	March 23, 2012	Mount Lemmon	Mount Lemmon Survey	HOF	1.8 km	MPC · JPL
780073	2012 FZ_{101}	—	November 2, 2010	Mount Lemmon	Mount Lemmon Survey	AEO	680 m	MPC · JPL
780074	2012 FG_{102}	—	March 25, 2012	Mount Lemmon	Mount Lemmon Survey	·	1.4 km	MPC · JPL
780075	2012 FL_{103}	—	March 24, 2012	Mount Lemmon	Mount Lemmon Survey	·	1.2 km	MPC · JPL
780076	2012 FX_{104}	—	March 29, 2012	Haleakala	Pan-STARRS 1	(32418)	1.3 km	MPC · JPL
780077	2012 FL_{105}	—	March 25, 2012	Mount Lemmon	Mount Lemmon Survey	·	1.7 km	MPC · JPL
780078	2012 FO_{105}	—	March 16, 2012	Haleakala	Pan-STARRS 1	·	1.5 km	MPC · JPL
780079	2012 FP_{105}	—	March 17, 2012	Mount Lemmon	Mount Lemmon Survey	·	1.4 km	MPC · JPL
780080	2012 FT_{105}	—	March 21, 2012	Mount Lemmon	Mount Lemmon Survey	EOS	1.6 km	MPC · JPL
780081	2012 FB_{106}	—	March 27, 2012	Kitt Peak	Spacewatch	·	1.3 km	MPC · JPL
780082	2012 FF_{106}	—	March 17, 2012	Mount Lemmon	Mount Lemmon Survey	·	1.3 km	MPC · JPL
780083	2012 FJ_{106}	—	March 16, 2012	Haleakala	Pan-STARRS 1	·	1.2 km	MPC · JPL
780084	2012 FO_{106}	—	March 17, 2012	Mount Lemmon	Mount Lemmon Survey	·	960 m	MPC · JPL
780085	2012 FP_{106}	—	March 29, 2012	Haleakala	Pan-STARRS 1	·	1.3 km	MPC · JPL
780086	2012 FQ_{106}	—	March 17, 2012	Mount Lemmon	Mount Lemmon Survey	·	1.4 km	MPC · JPL
780087	2012 FG_{107}	—	March 27, 2012	Bergisch Gladbach	W. Bickel	·	1.3 km	MPC · JPL
780088	2012 FP_{107}	—	March 23, 2012	Mount Lemmon	Mount Lemmon Survey	·	1.1 km	MPC · JPL
780089	2012 FH_{108}	—	March 23, 2012	Kitt Peak	Spacewatch	·	1.3 km	MPC · JPL
780090	2012 FP_{110}	—	March 16, 2012	Kitt Peak	Spacewatch	HOF	1.9 km	MPC · JPL
780091	2012 FT_{112}	—	March 23, 2012	Mount Lemmon	Mount Lemmon Survey	·	1.7 km	MPC · JPL
780092	2012 FY_{112}	—	March 29, 2012	Haleakala	Pan-STARRS 1	EOS	1.2 km	MPC · JPL
780093	2012 FO_{113}	—	March 29, 2012	Mount Lemmon	Mount Lemmon Survey	·	1.7 km	MPC · JPL
780094	2012 FT_{113}	—	March 27, 2012	Mount Lemmon	Mount Lemmon Survey	EOS	1.4 km	MPC · JPL
780095	2012 FX_{114}	—	March 25, 2012	Mount Lemmon	Mount Lemmon Survey	·	1.4 km	MPC · JPL
780096	2012 FB_{115}	—	March 24, 2012	Mount Lemmon	Mount Lemmon Survey	·	1.1 km	MPC · JPL
780097	2012 FG_{118}	—	March 17, 2012	Mount Lemmon	Mount Lemmon Survey	·	1.2 km	MPC · JPL
780098	2012 FK_{118}	—	March 30, 2012	Mount Lemmon	Mount Lemmon Survey	·	1.1 km	MPC · JPL
780099	2012 GP_{3}	—	April 11, 2012	Mount Lemmon	Mount Lemmon Survey	·	1.4 km	MPC · JPL
780100	2012 GS_{8}	—	March 10, 2007	Kitt Peak	Spacewatch	·	1.4 km	MPC · JPL

== 780101–780200 ==
back to top

Designation			Discovery			Properties		Ref
Permanent	Provisional	Named after	Date	Site	Discoverer(s)	Category	Diam.	Ref
780101	2012 GR_{16}	—	October 18, 2009	Mount Lemmon	Mount Lemmon Survey	·	1.6 km	MPC · JPL
780102	2012 GN_{19}	—	March 28, 2012	Kitt Peak	Spacewatch	·	1.3 km	MPC · JPL
780103	2012 GH_{20}	—	March 29, 2012	Haleakala	Pan-STARRS 1	·	1.3 km	MPC · JPL
780104	2012 GX_{23}	—	September 6, 2008	Mount Lemmon	Mount Lemmon Survey	·	2.9 km	MPC · JPL
780105	2012 GG_{36}	—	April 15, 2012	Haleakala	Pan-STARRS 1	DOR	1.7 km	MPC · JPL
780106	2012 GC_{41}	—	April 29, 2008	Mount Lemmon	Mount Lemmon Survey	·	1.4 km	MPC · JPL
780107	2012 GP_{44}	—	February 5, 2016	Haleakala	Pan-STARRS 1	·	1.8 km	MPC · JPL
780108	2012 GA_{45}	—	September 24, 2014	Kitt Peak	Spacewatch	EOS	1.3 km	MPC · JPL
780109	2012 GF_{45}	—	July 16, 2013	Haleakala	Pan-STARRS 1	EOS	1.3 km	MPC · JPL
780110	2012 GT_{45}	—	February 4, 2017	Haleakala	Pan-STARRS 1	·	1.7 km	MPC · JPL
780111	2012 GG_{46}	—	January 3, 2017	Haleakala	Pan-STARRS 1	·	2.1 km	MPC · JPL
780112	2012 GM_{46}	—	November 9, 2015	Mount Lemmon	Mount Lemmon Survey	·	2.6 km	MPC · JPL
780113	2012 GB_{47}	—	May 18, 2018	Mount Lemmon	Mount Lemmon Survey	·	2.5 km	MPC · JPL
780114	2012 GQ_{47}	—	April 11, 2012	Mount Lemmon	Mount Lemmon Survey	·	1.9 km	MPC · JPL
780115	2012 GE_{48}	—	February 5, 2016	Haleakala	Pan-STARRS 1	·	1.5 km	MPC · JPL
780116	2012 GV_{48}	—	April 11, 2012	Mount Lemmon	Mount Lemmon Survey	·	1.6 km	MPC · JPL
780117	2012 GN_{49}	—	April 15, 2012	Haleakala	Pan-STARRS 1	·	1.3 km	MPC · JPL
780118	2012 GF_{52}	—	April 15, 2012	Haleakala	Pan-STARRS 1	NEM	1.5 km	MPC · JPL
780119	2012 GP_{53}	—	April 15, 2012	Haleakala	Pan-STARRS 1	LIX	2.2 km	MPC · JPL
780120	2012 GT_{54}	—	April 15, 2012	Haleakala	Pan-STARRS 1	HOF	1.8 km	MPC · JPL
780121	2012 HC_{1}	—	April 16, 2012	Haleakala	Pan-STARRS 1	·	1.4 km	MPC · JPL
780122	2012 HL_{7}	—	November 8, 2009	Mount Lemmon	Mount Lemmon Survey	EOS	1.4 km	MPC · JPL
780123	2012 HW_{32}	—	April 19, 2012	Kitt Peak	Spacewatch	·	1.1 km	MPC · JPL
780124	2012 HW_{36}	—	April 1, 2003	Apache Point	SDSS	·	1.2 km	MPC · JPL
780125	2012 HL_{41}	—	April 16, 2012	Kitt Peak	Spacewatch	·	2.0 km	MPC · JPL
780126	2012 HO_{51}	—	April 19, 2012	Kitt Peak	Spacewatch	DOR	1.9 km	MPC · JPL
780127	2012 HM_{52}	—	March 29, 2012	Kitt Peak	Spacewatch	·	1.6 km	MPC · JPL
780128	2012 HX_{54}	—	April 16, 2012	Kitt Peak	Spacewatch	·	1.3 km	MPC · JPL
780129	2012 HJ_{59}	—	April 18, 2012	Kitt Peak	Spacewatch	JUN	900 m	MPC · JPL
780130	2012 HC_{62}	—	March 29, 2012	Haleakala	Pan-STARRS 1	JUN	730 m	MPC · JPL
780131	2012 HV_{70}	—	April 23, 2012	Kitt Peak	Spacewatch	·	1.5 km	MPC · JPL
780132	2012 HB_{78}	—	April 29, 2012	Mount Lemmon	Mount Lemmon Survey	THM	1.8 km	MPC · JPL
780133	2012 HJ_{85}	—	March 30, 2012	Mount Lemmon	Mount Lemmon Survey	·	1.5 km	MPC · JPL
780134	2012 HR_{87}	—	April 27, 2012	Haleakala	Pan-STARRS 1	·	1.3 km	MPC · JPL
780135	2012 HU_{89}	—	January 31, 2017	Haleakala	Pan-STARRS 1	LUT	3.6 km	MPC · JPL
780136	2012 HB_{90}	—	October 25, 2014	Mount Lemmon	Mount Lemmon Survey	BRA	1.1 km	MPC · JPL
780137 Gatterer	2012 HK_{91}	Gatterer	April 16, 2012	Mount Graham	K. Černis, R. P. Boyle	·	1.0 km	MPC · JPL
780138	2012 HO_{93}	—	June 10, 2018	Haleakala	Pan-STARRS 1	·	2.9 km	MPC · JPL
780139	2012 HZ_{94}	—	April 27, 2012	Haleakala	Pan-STARRS 1	·	1.8 km	MPC · JPL
780140	2012 HX_{96}	—	April 24, 2012	Mount Lemmon	Mount Lemmon Survey	·	1.2 km	MPC · JPL
780141	2012 HY_{96}	—	October 18, 2014	Mount Lemmon	Mount Lemmon Survey	·	1.4 km	MPC · JPL
780142	2012 HP_{97}	—	October 2, 2014	Haleakala	Pan-STARRS 1	·	1.9 km	MPC · JPL
780143	2012 HV_{98}	—	April 23, 2012	Kitt Peak	Spacewatch	·	1.1 km	MPC · JPL
780144	2012 HT_{100}	—	April 27, 2012	Haleakala	Pan-STARRS 1	·	1.1 km	MPC · JPL
780145	2012 HS_{101}	—	April 28, 2012	Kitt Peak	Spacewatch	CLO	1.5 km	MPC · JPL
780146	2012 HU_{104}	—	April 27, 2012	Haleakala	Pan-STARRS 1	·	1.2 km	MPC · JPL
780147	2012 HV_{104}	—	April 27, 2012	Mount Lemmon	Mount Lemmon Survey	·	1.2 km	MPC · JPL
780148	2012 HB_{105}	—	April 30, 2012	Mount Lemmon	Mount Lemmon Survey	·	1.7 km	MPC · JPL
780149	2012 HC_{105}	—	April 20, 2012	Mount Lemmon	Mount Lemmon Survey	·	1.4 km	MPC · JPL
780150	2012 HU_{105}	—	April 18, 2012	Mount Lemmon	Mount Lemmon Survey	AEO	770 m	MPC · JPL
780151	2012 HD_{108}	—	April 21, 2012	Haleakala	Pan-STARRS 1	·	2.2 km	MPC · JPL
780152	2012 HM_{108}	—	April 27, 2012	Kitt Peak	Spacewatch	·	1.8 km	MPC · JPL
780153	2012 HV_{110}	—	April 21, 2012	Haleakala	Pan-STARRS 1	·	1.3 km	MPC · JPL
780154	2012 HD_{113}	—	April 27, 2012	Haleakala	Pan-STARRS 1	·	1.1 km	MPC · JPL
780155	2012 HO_{116}	—	April 27, 2012	Haleakala	Pan-STARRS 1	·	1.3 km	MPC · JPL
780156	2012 HR_{116}	—	April 27, 2012	Haleakala	Pan-STARRS 1	KOR	870 m	MPC · JPL
780157	2012 JX	—	June 1, 2008	Mount Lemmon	Mount Lemmon Survey	DOR	1.9 km	MPC · JPL
780158	2012 JC_{2}	—	May 12, 2012	Mount Lemmon	Mount Lemmon Survey	·	1.4 km	MPC · JPL
780159	2012 JU_{6}	—	May 12, 2012	Mount Lemmon	Mount Lemmon Survey	·	1.0 km	MPC · JPL
780160	2012 JZ_{13}	—	May 15, 2012	Mount Lemmon	Mount Lemmon Survey	·	1.6 km	MPC · JPL
780161	2012 JA_{15}	—	January 8, 2011	Mount Lemmon	Mount Lemmon Survey	·	1.4 km	MPC · JPL
780162	2012 JQ_{15}	—	May 12, 2012	Mount Lemmon	Mount Lemmon Survey	·	1.1 km	MPC · JPL
780163	2012 JE_{17}	—	January 29, 2011	Mount Lemmon	Mount Lemmon Survey	·	1.3 km	MPC · JPL
780164	2012 JT_{25}	—	March 16, 2012	Mount Lemmon	Mount Lemmon Survey	TIN	900 m	MPC · JPL
780165	2012 JE_{33}	—	May 13, 2012	Mount Lemmon	Mount Lemmon Survey	·	1.3 km	MPC · JPL
780166	2012 JU_{33}	—	April 30, 2012	Mount Lemmon	Mount Lemmon Survey	·	1.6 km	MPC · JPL
780167	2012 JM_{38}	—	April 27, 2012	Haleakala	Pan-STARRS 1	·	980 m	MPC · JPL
780168	2012 JC_{40}	—	April 27, 2012	Kitt Peak	Spacewatch	·	1.4 km	MPC · JPL
780169	2012 JW_{41}	—	May 13, 2012	Mount Lemmon	Mount Lemmon Survey	·	1.2 km	MPC · JPL
780170	2012 JP_{43}	—	May 15, 2012	Mount Lemmon	Mount Lemmon Survey	EOS	1.4 km	MPC · JPL
780171	2012 JE_{45}	—	May 15, 2012	Haleakala	Pan-STARRS 1	·	1.3 km	MPC · JPL
780172	2012 JJ_{50}	—	April 27, 2012	Haleakala	Pan-STARRS 1	·	2.1 km	MPC · JPL
780173	2012 JP_{51}	—	April 30, 2012	Mount Lemmon	Mount Lemmon Survey	·	1.4 km	MPC · JPL
780174	2012 JR_{55}	—	April 21, 2012	Mount Lemmon	Mount Lemmon Survey	·	1.4 km	MPC · JPL
780175	2012 JM_{56}	—	April 28, 2012	Mount Lemmon	Mount Lemmon Survey	·	1.2 km	MPC · JPL
780176	2012 JJ_{57}	—	May 12, 2012	Mount Lemmon	Mount Lemmon Survey	·	1.5 km	MPC · JPL
780177	2012 JN_{65}	—	May 15, 2012	Haleakala	Pan-STARRS 1	·	1.4 km	MPC · JPL
780178	2012 JB_{68}	—	May 14, 2012	Haleakala	Pan-STARRS 1	·	1.2 km	MPC · JPL
780179	2012 JA_{69}	—	October 3, 2014	Haleakala	Pan-STARRS 1	T_{j} (2.97)	2.7 km	MPC · JPL
780180	2012 JA_{70}	—	February 9, 2016	Haleakala	Pan-STARRS 1	·	1.6 km	MPC · JPL
780181	2012 JF_{70}	—	May 1, 2012	Mount Lemmon	Mount Lemmon Survey	MRX	740 m	MPC · JPL
780182	2012 JA_{73}	—	December 14, 2010	Mount Lemmon	Mount Lemmon Survey	·	1.1 km	MPC · JPL
780183	2012 KS_{16}	—	November 6, 2010	Mount Lemmon	Mount Lemmon Survey	·	1.4 km	MPC · JPL
780184	2012 KJ_{20}	—	April 17, 2012	Kitt Peak	Spacewatch	EUN	920 m	MPC · JPL
780185	2012 KL_{21}	—	May 17, 2012	Mount Lemmon	Mount Lemmon Survey	·	1.3 km	MPC · JPL
780186	2012 KV_{22}	—	May 18, 2012	Mount Lemmon	Mount Lemmon Survey	·	1.4 km	MPC · JPL
780187	2012 KM_{31}	—	March 24, 2012	Kitt Peak	Spacewatch	·	1.4 km	MPC · JPL
780188	2012 KR_{40}	—	May 19, 2012	Mount Lemmon	Mount Lemmon Survey	·	1.7 km	MPC · JPL
780189	2012 KH_{42}	—	May 23, 2012	Kitt Peak	Spacewatch	·	1.6 km	MPC · JPL
780190	2012 KO_{43}	—	August 4, 2008	Markleeville	W. G. Dillon, D. Wells	·	1.2 km	MPC · JPL
780191	2012 KX_{43}	—	April 20, 2012	Mount Lemmon	Mount Lemmon Survey	·	1.2 km	MPC · JPL
780192	2012 KP_{44}	—	February 10, 2007	Mount Lemmon	Mount Lemmon Survey	·	1.2 km	MPC · JPL
780193	2012 KK_{59}	—	November 14, 2014	Kitt Peak	Spacewatch	·	2.1 km	MPC · JPL
780194	2012 KO_{60}	—	May 21, 2012	Haleakala	Pan-STARRS 1	·	1.2 km	MPC · JPL
780195	2012 KD_{61}	—	May 19, 2012	Mount Lemmon	Mount Lemmon Survey	·	1.2 km	MPC · JPL
780196	2012 KN_{62}	—	May 27, 2012	Mount Lemmon	Mount Lemmon Survey	·	1.5 km	MPC · JPL
780197	2012 KO_{62}	—	May 19, 2012	Mount Lemmon	Mount Lemmon Survey	·	1.5 km	MPC · JPL
780198	2012 KS_{62}	—	May 29, 2012	Mount Lemmon	Mount Lemmon Survey	·	1.2 km	MPC · JPL
780199	2012 KT_{62}	—	May 16, 2012	Mount Lemmon	Mount Lemmon Survey	AGN	1.0 km	MPC · JPL
780200	2012 KU_{62}	—	May 21, 2012	Mount Lemmon	Mount Lemmon Survey	·	1.6 km	MPC · JPL

== 780201–780300 ==
back to top

Designation			Discovery			Properties		Ref
Permanent	Provisional	Named after	Date	Site	Discoverer(s)	Category	Diam.	Ref
780201	2012 LY	—	April 24, 2012	Mount Lemmon	Mount Lemmon Survey	·	2.1 km	MPC · JPL
780202	2012 LT_{15}	—	June 9, 2012	Kitt Peak	Spacewatch	·	2.7 km	MPC · JPL
780203	2012 LU_{30}	—	March 5, 2016	Haleakala	Pan-STARRS 1	·	1.9 km	MPC · JPL
780204	2012 LE_{32}	—	June 11, 2012	Mount Lemmon	Mount Lemmon Survey	·	1.5 km	MPC · JPL
780205	2012 LB_{33}	—	June 8, 2012	Mount Lemmon	Mount Lemmon Survey	·	1.7 km	MPC · JPL
780206	2012 MB_{6}	—	June 22, 2012	SM Montmagastrell	Bosch, J. M.	·	1.4 km	MPC · JPL
780207	2012 MJ_{8}	—	May 30, 2012	Mount Lemmon	Mount Lemmon Survey	·	1.5 km	MPC · JPL
780208	2012 MK_{15}	—	September 19, 2001	Socorro	LINEAR	LIX	2.7 km	MPC · JPL
780209	2012 MX_{17}	—	September 6, 2013	Mount Lemmon	Mount Lemmon Survey	EOS	1.4 km	MPC · JPL
780210	2012 NZ_{1}	—	July 15, 2012	Mayhill-ISON	L. Elenin	·	1.5 km	MPC · JPL
780211	2012 PO_{3}	—	August 8, 2012	Haleakala	Pan-STARRS 1	T_{j} (2.99) · 3:2	4.0 km	MPC · JPL
780212	2012 PP_{9}	—	August 8, 2012	Haleakala	Pan-STARRS 1	EOS	1.4 km	MPC · JPL
780213	2012 PS_{9}	—	December 29, 2008	Kitt Peak	Spacewatch	·	2.4 km	MPC · JPL
780214	2012 PE_{13}	—	August 10, 2012	Kitt Peak	Spacewatch	·	1.5 km	MPC · JPL
780215	2012 PU_{15}	—	August 11, 2012	Haleakala	Pan-STARRS 1	EOS	1.3 km	MPC · JPL
780216	2012 PW_{21}	—	August 13, 2012	Haleakala	Pan-STARRS 1	·	1.7 km	MPC · JPL
780217	2012 PM_{23}	—	August 13, 2012	Haleakala	Pan-STARRS 1	·	1.5 km	MPC · JPL
780218	2012 PS_{23}	—	August 13, 2012	Haleakala	Pan-STARRS 1	EOS	1.4 km	MPC · JPL
780219	2012 PH_{27}	—	September 16, 2007	Bergisch Gladbach	W. Bickel	·	1.7 km	MPC · JPL
780220	2012 PF_{34}	—	September 18, 2003	Kitt Peak	Spacewatch	·	1.4 km	MPC · JPL
780221	2012 PE_{37}	—	August 14, 2012	Haleakala	Pan-STARRS 1	TIR	2.4 km	MPC · JPL
780222	2012 PZ_{46}	—	February 8, 2015	Mount Lemmon	Mount Lemmon Survey	EOS	1.2 km	MPC · JPL
780223	2012 PA_{47}	—	August 10, 2012	Kitt Peak	Spacewatch	EOS	1.5 km	MPC · JPL
780224	2012 PU_{52}	—	May 6, 2016	Haleakala	Pan-STARRS 1	·	1.3 km	MPC · JPL
780225	2012 PY_{52}	—	August 13, 2012	Haleakala	Pan-STARRS 1	·	2.0 km	MPC · JPL
780226	2012 PA_{53}	—	March 16, 2016	Haleakala	Pan-STARRS 1	VER	2.1 km	MPC · JPL
780227	2012 PF_{53}	—	July 26, 2017	Haleakala	Pan-STARRS 1	EOS	1.2 km	MPC · JPL
780228	2012 PZ_{54}	—	August 12, 2012	Haleakala	Pan-STARRS 1	·	1.5 km	MPC · JPL
780229	2012 PC_{55}	—	August 13, 2012	Haleakala	Pan-STARRS 1	·	2.1 km	MPC · JPL
780230	2012 PF_{55}	—	August 13, 2012	Haleakala	Pan-STARRS 1	·	2.0 km	MPC · JPL
780231	2012 PL_{56}	—	August 13, 2012	Haleakala	Pan-STARRS 1	·	1.3 km	MPC · JPL
780232	2012 PF_{57}	—	August 12, 2012	Kitt Peak	Spacewatch	·	2.0 km	MPC · JPL
780233	2012 PX_{59}	—	August 13, 2012	Haleakala	Pan-STARRS 1	·	1.5 km	MPC · JPL
780234	2012 PU_{61}	—	August 14, 2012	Haleakala	Pan-STARRS 1	EOS	1.5 km	MPC · JPL
780235	2012 PW_{61}	—	August 14, 2012	Haleakala	Pan-STARRS 1	·	1.5 km	MPC · JPL
780236	2012 PK_{62}	—	August 10, 2012	Kitt Peak	Spacewatch	·	1.8 km	MPC · JPL
780237	2012 PX_{62}	—	August 12, 2012	Kitt Peak	Spacewatch	·	2.1 km	MPC · JPL
780238	2012 PB_{63}	—	August 13, 2012	Haleakala	Pan-STARRS 1	VER	1.8 km	MPC · JPL
780239	2012 PT_{63}	—	August 8, 2012	Haleakala	Pan-STARRS 1	EOS	1.3 km	MPC · JPL
780240	2012 PR_{64}	—	August 18, 2018	Haleakala	Pan-STARRS 1	·	2.2 km	MPC · JPL
780241	2012 QK_{4}	—	August 16, 2012	ESA OGS	ESA OGS	·	1.5 km	MPC · JPL
780242	2012 QB_{6}	—	August 17, 2012	Haleakala	Pan-STARRS 1	·	2.0 km	MPC · JPL
780243	2012 QK_{11}	—	August 17, 2012	Haleakala	Pan-STARRS 1	·	1.5 km	MPC · JPL
780244	2012 QA_{12}	—	August 17, 2012	Haleakala	Pan-STARRS 1	·	2.1 km	MPC · JPL
780245	2012 QN_{15}	—	August 11, 2012	Siding Spring	SSS	·	1.2 km	MPC · JPL
780246	2012 QM_{18}	—	August 18, 2012	ESA OGS	ESA OGS	·	790 m	MPC · JPL
780247	2012 QU_{19}	—	August 16, 2012	Haleakala	Pan-STARRS 1	DOR	1.7 km	MPC · JPL
780248	2012 QP_{24}	—	August 24, 2012	Kitt Peak	Spacewatch	L5	8.1 km	MPC · JPL
780249	2012 QT_{24}	—	August 24, 2012	Kitt Peak	Spacewatch	·	1.5 km	MPC · JPL
780250	2012 QZ_{27}	—	August 24, 2012	Kitt Peak	Spacewatch	EOS	1.4 km	MPC · JPL
780251	2012 QC_{28}	—	August 24, 2012	Kitt Peak	Spacewatch	·	1.8 km	MPC · JPL
780252	2012 QH_{28}	—	August 24, 2012	Kitt Peak	Spacewatch	·	1.9 km	MPC · JPL
780253	2012 QP_{45}	—	August 16, 2012	ESA OGS	ESA OGS	·	2.4 km	MPC · JPL
780254	2012 QO_{46}	—	August 17, 2012	ESA OGS	ESA OGS	·	1.6 km	MPC · JPL
780255	2012 QL_{47}	—	August 13, 2012	Haleakala	Pan-STARRS 1	·	1.9 km	MPC · JPL
780256	2012 QR_{49}	—	August 25, 2012	Alder Springs	K. Levin, N. Teamo	·	1.7 km	MPC · JPL
780257	2012 QY_{51}	—	August 26, 2012	Haleakala	Pan-STARRS 1	KON	2.1 km	MPC · JPL
780258	2012 QA_{53}	—	August 26, 2012	Haleakala	Pan-STARRS 1	·	1.3 km	MPC · JPL
780259	2012 QA_{56}	—	August 26, 2012	Haleakala	Pan-STARRS 1	·	1.4 km	MPC · JPL
780260	2012 QF_{59}	—	August 28, 2012	Mount Lemmon	Mount Lemmon Survey	·	2.9 km	MPC · JPL
780261	2012 QT_{60}	—	August 26, 2012	Kitt Peak	Spacewatch	·	1.8 km	MPC · JPL
780262	2012 QA_{61}	—	August 18, 2012	ESA OGS	ESA OGS	·	2.1 km	MPC · JPL
780263	2012 QC_{63}	—	November 1, 2013	Mount Lemmon	Mount Lemmon Survey	·	2.1 km	MPC · JPL
780264	2012 QE_{63}	—	November 27, 2013	Haleakala	Pan-STARRS 1	·	1.3 km	MPC · JPL
780265	2012 QV_{64}	—	August 25, 2012	Kitt Peak	Spacewatch	·	1.9 km	MPC · JPL
780266	2012 QL_{68}	—	August 26, 2012	Haleakala	Pan-STARRS 1	·	1.2 km	MPC · JPL
780267	2012 QS_{68}	—	August 26, 2012	Haleakala	Pan-STARRS 1	·	2.1 km	MPC · JPL
780268	2012 QJ_{69}	—	August 17, 2012	Haleakala	Pan-STARRS 1	·	2.0 km	MPC · JPL
780269	2012 QL_{69}	—	August 17, 2012	Haleakala	Pan-STARRS 1	EMA	1.8 km	MPC · JPL
780270	2012 QQ_{69}	—	August 22, 2012	Črni Vrh	Skvarč, J.	·	2.3 km	MPC · JPL
780271	2012 QR_{70}	—	August 25, 2012	Mount Lemmon	Mount Lemmon Survey	EOS	1.3 km	MPC · JPL
780272	2012 QL_{72}	—	October 27, 2008	Mount Lemmon	Mount Lemmon Survey	·	1.4 km	MPC · JPL
780273	2012 QM_{72}	—	August 26, 2012	Haleakala	Pan-STARRS 1	·	1.5 km	MPC · JPL
780274	2012 QT_{73}	—	August 26, 2012	Haleakala	Pan-STARRS 1	EOS	1.3 km	MPC · JPL
780275	2012 QA_{77}	—	August 26, 2012	Haleakala	Pan-STARRS 1	·	1.4 km	MPC · JPL
780276	2012 QJ_{77}	—	August 17, 2012	Haleakala	Pan-STARRS 1	KOR	1.1 km	MPC · JPL
780277	2012 QN_{77}	—	August 26, 2012	Haleakala	Pan-STARRS 1	·	1.7 km	MPC · JPL
780278	2012 QO_{77}	—	October 15, 2012	Haleakala	Pan-STARRS 1	EOS	1.5 km	MPC · JPL
780279	2012 QT_{77}	—	August 17, 2012	Haleakala	Pan-STARRS 1	·	1.6 km	MPC · JPL
780280	2012 QM_{78}	—	August 26, 2012	Haleakala	Pan-STARRS 1	L5	6.2 km	MPC · JPL
780281	2012 QR_{81}	—	August 17, 2012	Haleakala	Pan-STARRS 1	·	1.7 km	MPC · JPL
780282	2012 QQ_{83}	—	August 17, 2012	Haleakala	Pan-STARRS 1	VER	2.0 km	MPC · JPL
780283	2012 RW_{4}	—	September 10, 2012	Westfield	International Astronomical Search Collaboration	·	2.3 km	MPC · JPL
780284	2012 RP_{10}	—	September 12, 2012	Mount Teide	E. Schwab	·	2.1 km	MPC · JPL
780285	2012 RZ_{10}	—	September 13, 2012	Mount Teide	E. Schwab	·	2.3 km	MPC · JPL
780286	2012 RF_{13}	—	August 26, 2012	Haleakala	Pan-STARRS 1	·	1.7 km	MPC · JPL
780287	2012 RS_{14}	—	September 15, 2012	Mount Lemmon	Mount Lemmon Survey	·	2.0 km	MPC · JPL
780288	2012 RL_{20}	—	September 15, 2012	Kislovodsk	Nevski, V.	·	2.3 km	MPC · JPL
780289	2012 RU_{28}	—	October 29, 2003	Kitt Peak	Spacewatch	·	1.7 km	MPC · JPL
780290	2012 RG_{32}	—	August 25, 2012	Haleakala	Pan-STARRS 1	·	2.0 km	MPC · JPL
780291	2012 RK_{38}	—	September 15, 2012	Catalina	CSS	·	1.8 km	MPC · JPL
780292	2012 RQ_{47}	—	September 15, 2012	Catalina	CSS	·	2.1 km	MPC · JPL
780293	2012 RW_{50}	—	July 26, 2017	Haleakala	Pan-STARRS 1	·	1.9 km	MPC · JPL
780294	2012 SU	—	September 16, 2012	Catalina	CSS	·	2.3 km	MPC · JPL
780295	2012 SR_{2}	—	September 16, 2012	Wildberg	R. Apitzsch	·	1.2 km	MPC · JPL
780296	2012 SV_{7}	—	May 1, 2006	Kitt Peak	Spacewatch	·	2.0 km	MPC · JPL
780297	2012 SF_{11}	—	September 16, 2012	Kitt Peak	Spacewatch	LIX	2.3 km	MPC · JPL
780298	2012 SP_{17}	—	September 17, 2012	Kitt Peak	Spacewatch	·	1.7 km	MPC · JPL
780299	2012 SM_{19}	—	September 18, 2012	Mount Lemmon	Mount Lemmon Survey	·	1.3 km	MPC · JPL
780300	2012 SD_{35}	—	September 18, 2012	Mount Lemmon	Mount Lemmon Survey	·	1.3 km	MPC · JPL

== 780301–780400 ==
back to top

Designation			Discovery			Properties		Ref
Permanent	Provisional	Named after	Date	Site	Discoverer(s)	Category	Diam.	Ref
780301	2012 SS_{36}	—	December 5, 2008	Kitt Peak	Spacewatch	KOR	1 km	MPC · JPL
780302	2012 SM_{37}	—	September 18, 2012	Mount Lemmon	Mount Lemmon Survey	KOR	950 m	MPC · JPL
780303	2012 SJ_{38}	—	September 18, 2012	Mount Lemmon	Mount Lemmon Survey	HYG	2.0 km	MPC · JPL
780304	2012 SX_{39}	—	September 18, 2012	Mount Lemmon	Mount Lemmon Survey	TIR	1.7 km	MPC · JPL
780305	2012 SZ_{40}	—	September 18, 2012	Mount Lemmon	Mount Lemmon Survey	L5	6.5 km	MPC · JPL
780306	2012 SB_{41}	—	September 18, 2012	Mount Lemmon	Mount Lemmon Survey	·	1.8 km	MPC · JPL
780307	2012 SP_{45}	—	October 11, 2007	Kitt Peak	Spacewatch	EOS	1.5 km	MPC · JPL
780308	2012 SG_{49}	—	September 23, 2012	Mount Lemmon	Mount Lemmon Survey	·	2.2 km	MPC · JPL
780309	2012 SS_{55}	—	August 25, 2012	Kitt Peak	Spacewatch	·	1.3 km	MPC · JPL
780310	2012 SZ_{60}	—	August 26, 2012	Haleakala	Pan-STARRS 1	·	2.1 km	MPC · JPL
780311	2012 SZ_{67}	—	September 25, 2012	Mount Lemmon	Mount Lemmon Survey	·	2.1 km	MPC · JPL
780312	2012 SN_{68}	—	September 21, 2012	Mount Lemmon	Mount Lemmon Survey	·	1.5 km	MPC · JPL
780313	2012 SQ_{73}	—	January 2, 2014	Kitt Peak	Spacewatch	·	2.2 km	MPC · JPL
780314	2012 SD_{74}	—	September 23, 2012	Nogales	M. Schwartz, P. R. Holvorcem	·	2.6 km	MPC · JPL
780315	2012 SU_{74}	—	August 3, 2016	Haleakala	Pan-STARRS 1	·	1.3 km	MPC · JPL
780316	2012 SX_{79}	—	October 13, 2001	Socorro	LINEAR	LIX	2.9 km	MPC · JPL
780317	2012 SP_{80}	—	September 25, 2012	Kitt Peak	Spacewatch	·	1.9 km	MPC · JPL
780318	2012 ST_{80}	—	September 17, 2012	Kitt Peak	Spacewatch	EOS	1.5 km	MPC · JPL
780319	2012 SX_{80}	—	September 16, 2012	Kitt Peak	Spacewatch	·	2.1 km	MPC · JPL
780320	2012 SY_{80}	—	September 23, 2012	Mount Lemmon	Mount Lemmon Survey	·	2.1 km	MPC · JPL
780321	2012 SR_{81}	—	September 17, 2012	Mount Lemmon	Mount Lemmon Survey	·	1.9 km	MPC · JPL
780322	2012 SU_{82}	—	September 16, 2012	Mount Lemmon	Mount Lemmon Survey	EOS	1.3 km	MPC · JPL
780323	2012 SE_{83}	—	September 25, 2012	Mount Lemmon	Mount Lemmon Survey	·	2.0 km	MPC · JPL
780324	2012 SZ_{83}	—	July 26, 2017	Haleakala	Pan-STARRS 1	·	1.3 km	MPC · JPL
780325	2012 SA_{85}	—	November 12, 2013	Mount Lemmon	Mount Lemmon Survey	EOS	1.4 km	MPC · JPL
780326	2012 SF_{87}	—	September 25, 2012	Mount Lemmon	Mount Lemmon Survey	AGN	910 m	MPC · JPL
780327	2012 SS_{87}	—	September 19, 2012	Mount Lemmon	Mount Lemmon Survey	EOS	1.5 km	MPC · JPL
780328	2012 SC_{89}	—	September 21, 2012	Kitt Peak	Spacewatch	·	1.9 km	MPC · JPL
780329	2012 SD_{91}	—	September 17, 2012	Mount Lemmon	Mount Lemmon Survey	·	2.0 km	MPC · JPL
780330	2012 SK_{92}	—	September 19, 2012	Mount Lemmon	Mount Lemmon Survey	·	2.0 km	MPC · JPL
780331	2012 SQ_{92}	—	September 25, 2012	Mount Lemmon	Mount Lemmon Survey	·	2.0 km	MPC · JPL
780332	2012 SR_{92}	—	September 25, 2012	Mount Lemmon	Mount Lemmon Survey	·	3.0 km	MPC · JPL
780333	2012 SZ_{92}	—	September 17, 2012	Kitt Peak	Spacewatch	·	1.9 km	MPC · JPL
780334	2012 SB_{93}	—	September 16, 2012	Kitt Peak	Spacewatch	AGN	870 m	MPC · JPL
780335	2012 SO_{94}	—	September 25, 2012	Mount Lemmon	Mount Lemmon Survey	·	1.7 km	MPC · JPL
780336	2012 SW_{95}	—	September 16, 2012	Kitt Peak	Spacewatch	·	1.3 km	MPC · JPL
780337	2012 SJ_{96}	—	September 17, 2012	Mount Lemmon	Mount Lemmon Survey	·	2.2 km	MPC · JPL
780338	2012 SQ_{98}	—	September 25, 2012	Mount Lemmon	Mount Lemmon Survey	·	1.1 km	MPC · JPL
780339	2012 SW_{98}	—	September 17, 2012	Mount Lemmon	Mount Lemmon Survey	·	2.0 km	MPC · JPL
780340	2012 SV_{100}	—	September 19, 2012	Mount Lemmon	Mount Lemmon Survey	·	1.8 km	MPC · JPL
780341	2012 SH_{103}	—	September 25, 2012	Mount Lemmon	Mount Lemmon Survey	·	1.8 km	MPC · JPL
780342	2012 SN_{103}	—	September 17, 2012	Kitt Peak	Spacewatch	·	1.7 km	MPC · JPL
780343	2012 SS_{103}	—	September 16, 2012	Mount Lemmon	Mount Lemmon Survey	EOS	1.6 km	MPC · JPL
780344	2012 SV_{103}	—	September 25, 2012	Mount Lemmon	Mount Lemmon Survey	VER	1.9 km	MPC · JPL
780345	2012 SY_{104}	—	September 25, 2012	Mount Lemmon	Mount Lemmon Survey	LIX	2.3 km	MPC · JPL
780346	2012 SE_{105}	—	September 21, 2012	Mount Lemmon	Mount Lemmon Survey	·	1.6 km	MPC · JPL
780347	2012 SV_{105}	—	September 25, 2012	Mount Lemmon	Mount Lemmon Survey	·	2.4 km	MPC · JPL
780348	2012 SA_{106}	—	September 24, 2012	Mount Lemmon	Mount Lemmon Survey	·	1.8 km	MPC · JPL
780349	2012 SB_{106}	—	September 16, 2012	Mount Lemmon	Mount Lemmon Survey	·	2.0 km	MPC · JPL
780350	2012 SH_{107}	—	October 15, 2023	Haleakala	Pan-STARRS 1	·	1.3 km	MPC · JPL
780351	2012 SZ_{108}	—	September 18, 2012	Mount Lemmon	Mount Lemmon Survey	L5	5.9 km	MPC · JPL
780352	2012 TO_{1}	—	September 23, 2012	Mount Lemmon	Mount Lemmon Survey	THM	1.6 km	MPC · JPL
780353	2012 TG_{16}	—	September 21, 2012	Kitt Peak	Spacewatch	·	1 km	MPC · JPL
780354	2012 TE_{21}	—	September 25, 2012	Mount Lemmon	Mount Lemmon Survey	·	2.4 km	MPC · JPL
780355	2012 TO_{23}	—	October 8, 2012	Haleakala	Pan-STARRS 1	·	1.5 km	MPC · JPL
780356	2012 TV_{23}	—	October 8, 2012	Haleakala	Pan-STARRS 1	·	1.6 km	MPC · JPL
780357	2012 TE_{24}	—	November 1, 2007	Kitt Peak	Spacewatch	·	1.8 km	MPC · JPL
780358	2012 TN_{29}	—	September 24, 2008	Kitt Peak	Spacewatch	·	830 m	MPC · JPL
780359	2012 TF_{30}	—	October 5, 2012	Mount Lemmon	Mount Lemmon Survey	AGN	900 m	MPC · JPL
780360	2012 TK_{32}	—	October 6, 2012	Mount Lemmon	Mount Lemmon Survey	·	2.0 km	MPC · JPL
780361	2012 TZ_{37}	—	October 7, 2012	Haleakala	Pan-STARRS 1	·	790 m	MPC · JPL
780362	2012 TQ_{38}	—	December 4, 2008	Kitt Peak	Spacewatch	NEM	1.4 km	MPC · JPL
780363	2012 TA_{40}	—	October 8, 2012	Mount Lemmon	Mount Lemmon Survey	·	3.0 km	MPC · JPL
780364	2012 TN_{40}	—	October 8, 2012	Mount Lemmon	Mount Lemmon Survey	·	2.1 km	MPC · JPL
780365	2012 TX_{42}	—	September 24, 2012	Kitt Peak	Spacewatch	·	2.0 km	MPC · JPL
780366	2012 TR_{43}	—	October 8, 2012	Mount Lemmon	Mount Lemmon Survey	·	2.0 km	MPC · JPL
780367	2012 TX_{44}	—	October 8, 2012	Mount Lemmon	Mount Lemmon Survey	·	1.7 km	MPC · JPL
780368	2012 TW_{49}	—	October 8, 2012	Haleakala	Pan-STARRS 1	·	2.1 km	MPC · JPL
780369	2012 TB_{50}	—	October 8, 2012	Haleakala	Pan-STARRS 1	·	1.6 km	MPC · JPL
780370	2012 TH_{55}	—	December 5, 2007	Kitt Peak	Spacewatch	THM	1.8 km	MPC · JPL
780371	2012 TB_{63}	—	October 8, 2012	Haleakala	Pan-STARRS 1	LIX	2.6 km	MPC · JPL
780372	2012 TL_{66}	—	September 16, 2012	Mount Lemmon	Mount Lemmon Survey	·	2.7 km	MPC · JPL
780373	2012 TE_{68}	—	October 8, 2012	Mount Lemmon	Mount Lemmon Survey	·	1.5 km	MPC · JPL
780374	2012 TM_{69}	—	September 25, 2012	Kitt Peak	Spacewatch	·	1.9 km	MPC · JPL
780375	2012 TK_{72}	—	October 9, 2012	Mount Lemmon	Mount Lemmon Survey	·	2.4 km	MPC · JPL
780376	2012 TE_{73}	—	October 9, 2012	Mount Lemmon	Mount Lemmon Survey	·	1.2 km	MPC · JPL
780377	2012 TD_{75}	—	October 9, 2012	Haleakala	Pan-STARRS 1	KOR	970 m	MPC · JPL
780378	2012 TP_{76}	—	September 21, 2012	Kitt Peak	Spacewatch	·	1.8 km	MPC · JPL
780379	2012 TC_{77}	—	September 17, 2012	Mount Lemmon	Mount Lemmon Survey	·	1.9 km	MPC · JPL
780380	2012 TL_{83}	—	October 6, 2012	Mount Lemmon	Mount Lemmon Survey	·	2.4 km	MPC · JPL
780381	2012 TU_{91}	—	October 7, 2012	Haleakala	Pan-STARRS 1	·	1.5 km	MPC · JPL
780382	2012 TN_{94}	—	October 8, 2012	SM Montmagastrell	Bosch, J. M., Olivera, R. M.	·	1.8 km	MPC · JPL
780383	2012 TJ_{95}	—	October 8, 2012	Kitt Peak	Spacewatch	·	1.9 km	MPC · JPL
780384	2012 TU_{108}	—	October 10, 2012	Mount Lemmon	Mount Lemmon Survey	(1298)	1.7 km	MPC · JPL
780385	2012 TA_{113}	—	September 16, 2012	Kitt Peak	Spacewatch	·	1.1 km	MPC · JPL
780386	2012 TN_{113}	—	October 10, 2012	Mount Lemmon	Mount Lemmon Survey	·	1.8 km	MPC · JPL
780387	2012 TZ_{113}	—	September 17, 2012	Kitt Peak	Spacewatch	EOS	1.6 km	MPC · JPL
780388	2012 TE_{122}	—	October 10, 2012	Mount Lemmon	Mount Lemmon Survey	·	1.6 km	MPC · JPL
780389	2012 TR_{125}	—	September 14, 2012	Catalina	CSS	·	2.1 km	MPC · JPL
780390	2012 TJ_{141}	—	October 5, 2012	Haleakala	Pan-STARRS 1	·	1.9 km	MPC · JPL
780391	2012 TV_{144}	—	November 5, 2007	Kitt Peak	Spacewatch	·	1.8 km	MPC · JPL
780392	2012 TM_{148}	—	October 8, 2012	Haleakala	Pan-STARRS 1	EOS	1.3 km	MPC · JPL
780393	2012 TN_{151}	—	October 16, 2001	Kitt Peak	Spacewatch	·	2.5 km	MPC · JPL
780394	2012 TP_{151}	—	October 8, 2012	Mount Lemmon	Mount Lemmon Survey	·	2.1 km	MPC · JPL
780395	2012 TY_{155}	—	October 8, 2012	Haleakala	Pan-STARRS 1	·	850 m	MPC · JPL
780396	2012 TB_{158}	—	October 8, 2012	Haleakala	Pan-STARRS 1	·	1.3 km	MPC · JPL
780397	2012 TG_{158}	—	October 8, 2012	Haleakala	Pan-STARRS 1	·	2.0 km	MPC · JPL
780398	2012 TZ_{161}	—	September 15, 2012	Mount Lemmon	Mount Lemmon Survey	·	1.9 km	MPC · JPL
780399	2012 TY_{164}	—	November 12, 2007	Mount Lemmon	Mount Lemmon Survey	EOS	1.4 km	MPC · JPL
780400	2012 TK_{166}	—	October 24, 2008	Kitt Peak	Spacewatch	(5)	970 m	MPC · JPL

== 780401–780500 ==
back to top

Designation			Discovery			Properties		Ref
Permanent	Provisional	Named after	Date	Site	Discoverer(s)	Category	Diam.	Ref
780401	2012 TS_{182}	—	October 9, 2012	Haleakala	Pan-STARRS 1	KOR	1.1 km	MPC · JPL
780402	2012 TM_{183}	—	September 21, 2012	Kitt Peak	Spacewatch	THM	1.9 km	MPC · JPL
780403	2012 TD_{184}	—	October 9, 2012	Haleakala	Pan-STARRS 1	L5	5.7 km	MPC · JPL
780404	2012 TG_{184}	—	October 9, 2012	Haleakala	Pan-STARRS 1	·	2.2 km	MPC · JPL
780405	2012 TO_{184}	—	October 9, 2012	Haleakala	Pan-STARRS 1	EOS	1.1 km	MPC · JPL
780406	2012 TE_{199}	—	October 11, 2012	Kitt Peak	Spacewatch	·	2.7 km	MPC · JPL
780407	2012 TU_{203}	—	October 11, 2012	Mount Lemmon	Mount Lemmon Survey	L5	5.9 km	MPC · JPL
780408	2012 TG_{204}	—	October 9, 2007	Mount Lemmon	Mount Lemmon Survey	·	1.4 km	MPC · JPL
780409	2012 TU_{205}	—	October 11, 2012	Mount Lemmon	Mount Lemmon Survey	·	1.8 km	MPC · JPL
780410	2012 TA_{210}	—	September 23, 2008	Mount Lemmon	Mount Lemmon Survey	·	800 m	MPC · JPL
780411	2012 TH_{210}	—	January 1, 1993	Kitt Peak	Spacewatch	·	790 m	MPC · JPL
780412	2012 TP_{211}	—	September 16, 2012	Kitt Peak	Spacewatch	·	1.4 km	MPC · JPL
780413	2012 TK_{213}	—	October 11, 2012	Haleakala	Pan-STARRS 1	LIX	2.2 km	MPC · JPL
780414	2012 TX_{220}	—	October 14, 2012	Mount Lemmon	Mount Lemmon Survey	·	980 m	MPC · JPL
780415	2012 TS_{221}	—	October 14, 2012	Mount Lemmon	Mount Lemmon Survey	·	1.5 km	MPC · JPL
780416	2012 TM_{222}	—	December 10, 2005	Kitt Peak	Spacewatch	3:2 · SHU	3.5 km	MPC · JPL
780417	2012 TG_{226}	—	October 15, 2012	Haleakala	Pan-STARRS 1	·	1.5 km	MPC · JPL
780418	2012 TL_{227}	—	October 15, 2012	Haleakala	Pan-STARRS 1	·	2.0 km	MPC · JPL
780419	2012 TE_{229}	—	October 9, 2012	Mount Lemmon	Mount Lemmon Survey	·	1.3 km	MPC · JPL
780420	2012 TG_{233}	—	September 21, 2012	Catalina	CSS	·	2.0 km	MPC · JPL
780421	2012 TO_{234}	—	October 11, 2007	Mount Lemmon	Mount Lemmon Survey	EOS	1.4 km	MPC · JPL
780422	2012 TQ_{235}	—	October 7, 2012	Haleakala	Pan-STARRS 1	·	1.6 km	MPC · JPL
780423	2012 TH_{239}	—	October 8, 2012	Mount Lemmon	Mount Lemmon Survey	·	1.7 km	MPC · JPL
780424	2012 TK_{240}	—	August 27, 2006	Kitt Peak	Spacewatch	·	1.8 km	MPC · JPL
780425	2012 TY_{240}	—	October 8, 2012	Haleakala	Pan-STARRS 1	EOS	1.4 km	MPC · JPL
780426	2012 TJ_{241}	—	September 16, 2012	Mount Lemmon	Mount Lemmon Survey	·	2.7 km	MPC · JPL
780427	2012 TO_{243}	—	October 8, 2012	Mount Lemmon	Mount Lemmon Survey	LIX	2.0 km	MPC · JPL
780428	2012 TG_{246}	—	September 16, 2012	Catalina	CSS	·	2.3 km	MPC · JPL
780429	2012 TL_{246}	—	October 10, 2012	Haleakala	Pan-STARRS 1	·	1.4 km	MPC · JPL
780430	2012 TB_{247}	—	October 11, 2012	Kitt Peak	Spacewatch	·	2.0 km	MPC · JPL
780431	2012 TN_{248}	—	October 11, 2012	Haleakala	Pan-STARRS 1	EOS	1.3 km	MPC · JPL
780432	2012 TO_{248}	—	September 17, 2012	Kitt Peak	Spacewatch	·	1.5 km	MPC · JPL
780433	2012 TB_{249}	—	October 11, 2012	Haleakala	Pan-STARRS 1	·	1.6 km	MPC · JPL
780434	2012 TD_{250}	—	October 11, 2012	Haleakala	Pan-STARRS 1	·	1.8 km	MPC · JPL
780435	2012 TV_{251}	—	October 11, 2012	Haleakala	Pan-STARRS 1	VER	1.8 km	MPC · JPL
780436	2012 TC_{252}	—	October 11, 2012	Haleakala	Pan-STARRS 1	TIR	1.8 km	MPC · JPL
780437	2012 TP_{253}	—	October 11, 2012	Haleakala	Pan-STARRS 1	·	2.1 km	MPC · JPL
780438	2012 TK_{255}	—	October 11, 2012	Mount Lemmon	Mount Lemmon Survey	·	1.4 km	MPC · JPL
780439	2012 TU_{256}	—	July 18, 2006	Siding Spring	SSS	·	2.8 km	MPC · JPL
780440	2012 TW_{261}	—	October 8, 2012	Mount Lemmon	Mount Lemmon Survey	·	1.5 km	MPC · JPL
780441	2012 TH_{264}	—	October 8, 2012	Haleakala	Pan-STARRS 1	THM	1.4 km	MPC · JPL
780442	2012 TQ_{265}	—	October 8, 2012	Haleakala	Pan-STARRS 1	·	1.7 km	MPC · JPL
780443	2012 TY_{265}	—	October 8, 2012	Mount Lemmon	Mount Lemmon Survey	·	1.9 km	MPC · JPL
780444	2012 TR_{273}	—	October 15, 2012	Mount Lemmon	Mount Lemmon Survey	·	1.2 km	MPC · JPL
780445	2012 TN_{274}	—	October 15, 2012	Mount Lemmon	Mount Lemmon Survey	·	1.6 km	MPC · JPL
780446	2012 TY_{275}	—	October 11, 2012	Haleakala	Pan-STARRS 1	·	1.8 km	MPC · JPL
780447	2012 TS_{277}	—	October 11, 2012	Haleakala	Pan-STARRS 1	EOS	1.3 km	MPC · JPL
780448	2012 TX_{277}	—	October 11, 2012	Haleakala	Pan-STARRS 1	LIX	2.2 km	MPC · JPL
780449	2012 TX_{282}	—	October 14, 2012	Kitt Peak	Spacewatch	·	2.2 km	MPC · JPL
780450	2012 TW_{286}	—	October 8, 2012	Haleakala	Pan-STARRS 1	EOS	1.5 km	MPC · JPL
780451	2012 TO_{287}	—	October 10, 2012	Mount Lemmon	Mount Lemmon Survey	·	2.0 km	MPC · JPL
780452	2012 TU_{287}	—	October 10, 2012	Mount Lemmon	Mount Lemmon Survey	·	2.3 km	MPC · JPL
780453	2012 TL_{289}	—	September 19, 2006	Catalina	CSS	TIR	2.2 km	MPC · JPL
780454	2012 TU_{289}	—	October 11, 2012	Haleakala	Pan-STARRS 1	·	1.6 km	MPC · JPL
780455	2012 TX_{289}	—	October 11, 2012	Mount Lemmon	Mount Lemmon Survey	·	1.7 km	MPC · JPL
780456	2012 TA_{293}	—	October 6, 2012	Kitt Peak	Spacewatch	EOS	1.8 km	MPC · JPL
780457	2012 TQ_{296}	—	October 15, 2012	Kitt Peak	Spacewatch	·	2.4 km	MPC · JPL
780458	2012 TR_{296}	—	September 19, 2012	Mount Lemmon	Mount Lemmon Survey	·	1.9 km	MPC · JPL
780459	2012 TG_{299}	—	October 26, 2008	Kitt Peak	Spacewatch	·	860 m	MPC · JPL
780460	2012 TR_{304}	—	October 8, 2012	Haleakala	Pan-STARRS 1	·	2.1 km	MPC · JPL
780461	2012 TR_{311}	—	October 17, 2001	Socorro	LINEAR	·	1.9 km	MPC · JPL
780462	2012 TG_{318}	—	September 21, 2012	Nogales	M. Schwartz, P. R. Holvorcem	·	2.3 km	MPC · JPL
780463	2012 TX_{324}	—	October 8, 2012	Kitt Peak	Spacewatch	·	2.2 km	MPC · JPL
780464	2012 TK_{327}	—	October 10, 2012	Mount Lemmon	Mount Lemmon Survey	EOS	1.6 km	MPC · JPL
780465	2012 TV_{327}	—	October 11, 2012	Haleakala	Pan-STARRS 1	MAR	720 m	MPC · JPL
780466	2012 TZ_{327}	—	May 23, 2001	Cerro Tololo	Deep Ecliptic Survey	·	1.6 km	MPC · JPL
780467	2012 TG_{329}	—	October 9, 2012	Mount Lemmon	Mount Lemmon Survey	·	2.0 km	MPC · JPL
780468	2012 TK_{331}	—	October 8, 2012	Haleakala	Pan-STARRS 1	·	1.7 km	MPC · JPL
780469	2012 TH_{334}	—	October 8, 2012	Mount Lemmon	Mount Lemmon Survey	·	1.5 km	MPC · JPL
780470	2012 TU_{335}	—	July 26, 2017	Haleakala	Pan-STARRS 1	·	1.8 km	MPC · JPL
780471	2012 TC_{337}	—	October 14, 2012	Mount Lemmon	Mount Lemmon Survey	·	1.9 km	MPC · JPL
780472	2012 TZ_{337}	—	February 20, 2014	Mount Lemmon	Mount Lemmon Survey	·	2.7 km	MPC · JPL
780473	2012 TH_{341}	—	October 10, 2012	Mount Lemmon	Mount Lemmon Survey	LIX	2.9 km	MPC · JPL
780474	2012 TL_{342}	—	October 8, 2012	Mount Lemmon	Mount Lemmon Survey	·	2.1 km	MPC · JPL
780475	2012 TC_{345}	—	October 14, 2012	Kitt Peak	Spacewatch	(159)	1.8 km	MPC · JPL
780476	2012 TL_{345}	—	January 1, 2014	Kitt Peak	Spacewatch	·	2.0 km	MPC · JPL
780477	2012 TM_{345}	—	August 1, 2017	Haleakala	Pan-STARRS 1	·	2.3 km	MPC · JPL
780478	2012 TH_{346}	—	February 24, 2014	Haleakala	Pan-STARRS 1	T_{j} (2.98) · EUP	2.7 km	MPC · JPL
780479	2012 TJ_{348}	—	October 8, 2012	Haleakala	Pan-STARRS 1	·	2.6 km	MPC · JPL
780480	2012 TO_{348}	—	October 11, 2012	Haleakala	Pan-STARRS 1	·	1.8 km	MPC · JPL
780481	2012 TW_{349}	—	October 10, 2012	Kitt Peak	Spacewatch	·	2.2 km	MPC · JPL
780482	2012 TB_{351}	—	July 24, 2017	Haleakala	Pan-STARRS 1	·	1.6 km	MPC · JPL
780483	2012 TO_{353}	—	October 10, 2012	Mount Lemmon	Mount Lemmon Survey	VER	2.1 km	MPC · JPL
780484	2012 TU_{353}	—	October 15, 2012	Haleakala	Pan-STARRS 1	THM	1.5 km	MPC · JPL
780485	2012 TY_{353}	—	October 10, 2012	Mount Lemmon	Mount Lemmon Survey	EOS	1.7 km	MPC · JPL
780486	2012 TN_{354}	—	October 15, 2012	Haleakala	Pan-STARRS 1	THM	1.3 km	MPC · JPL
780487	2012 TU_{356}	—	October 15, 2012	Kitt Peak	Spacewatch	·	1.8 km	MPC · JPL
780488	2012 TK_{357}	—	October 11, 2012	Haleakala	Pan-STARRS 1	·	1.2 km	MPC · JPL
780489	2012 TN_{357}	—	October 14, 2012	Kitt Peak	Spacewatch	·	750 m	MPC · JPL
780490	2012 TP_{357}	—	October 11, 2012	Haleakala	Pan-STARRS 1	(5)	860 m	MPC · JPL
780491	2012 TC_{358}	—	October 8, 2012	Mount Lemmon	Mount Lemmon Survey	EOS	1.5 km	MPC · JPL
780492	2012 TU_{358}	—	October 9, 2012	Haleakala	Pan-STARRS 1	·	2.0 km	MPC · JPL
780493	2012 TV_{358}	—	October 11, 2012	Haleakala	Pan-STARRS 1	THM	2.0 km	MPC · JPL
780494	2012 TU_{359}	—	October 11, 2012	Haleakala	Pan-STARRS 1	·	2.2 km	MPC · JPL
780495	2012 TA_{361}	—	October 9, 2012	Mount Lemmon	Mount Lemmon Survey	·	1.8 km	MPC · JPL
780496	2012 TK_{361}	—	October 9, 2012	Haleakala	Pan-STARRS 1	·	1.2 km	MPC · JPL
780497	2012 TM_{361}	—	October 10, 2012	Haleakala	Pan-STARRS 1	·	1.9 km	MPC · JPL
780498	2012 TN_{365}	—	October 8, 2012	Kitt Peak	Spacewatch	EOS	1.4 km	MPC · JPL
780499	2012 TZ_{366}	—	October 11, 2012	Haleakala	Pan-STARRS 1	·	1.6 km	MPC · JPL
780500	2012 TA_{368}	—	October 14, 2012	Mount Lemmon	Mount Lemmon Survey	·	2.6 km	MPC · JPL

== 780501–780600 ==
back to top

Designation			Discovery			Properties		Ref
Permanent	Provisional	Named after	Date	Site	Discoverer(s)	Category	Diam.	Ref
780501	2012 TC_{369}	—	October 9, 2012	Haleakala	Pan-STARRS 1	·	2.1 km	MPC · JPL
780502	2012 TG_{369}	—	October 11, 2012	Haleakala	Pan-STARRS 1	·	1.9 km	MPC · JPL
780503	2012 TL_{369}	—	October 11, 2012	Haleakala	Pan-STARRS 1	·	2.3 km	MPC · JPL
780504	2012 TQ_{369}	—	October 11, 2012	Mount Lemmon	Mount Lemmon Survey	·	2.2 km	MPC · JPL
780505	2012 TS_{369}	—	October 8, 2012	Kitt Peak	Spacewatch	·	2.4 km	MPC · JPL
780506	2012 TD_{370}	—	October 15, 2012	Haleakala	Pan-STARRS 1	·	1.8 km	MPC · JPL
780507	2012 TX_{370}	—	October 7, 2012	Haleakala	Pan-STARRS 1	EOS	1.4 km	MPC · JPL
780508	2012 TD_{371}	—	October 8, 2012	Haleakala	Pan-STARRS 1	·	2.1 km	MPC · JPL
780509	2012 TE_{371}	—	October 14, 2012	Kitt Peak	Spacewatch	THM	1.6 km	MPC · JPL
780510	2012 TN_{372}	—	October 11, 2012	Haleakala	Pan-STARRS 1	·	1.8 km	MPC · JPL
780511	2012 TV_{372}	—	October 6, 2012	Haleakala	Pan-STARRS 1	·	2.0 km	MPC · JPL
780512	2012 TH_{373}	—	October 11, 2012	Haleakala	Pan-STARRS 1	·	1.5 km	MPC · JPL
780513	2012 TS_{373}	—	October 6, 2012	Haleakala	Pan-STARRS 1	EOS	1.5 km	MPC · JPL
780514	2012 TG_{374}	—	October 8, 2012	Haleakala	Pan-STARRS 1	THM	1.7 km	MPC · JPL
780515	2012 TR_{374}	—	October 10, 2012	Mount Lemmon	Mount Lemmon Survey	·	1.9 km	MPC · JPL
780516	2012 TY_{374}	—	October 9, 2012	Mount Lemmon	Mount Lemmon Survey	·	2.0 km	MPC · JPL
780517	2012 TC_{375}	—	October 10, 2012	Mount Lemmon	Mount Lemmon Survey	·	1.8 km	MPC · JPL
780518	2012 TG_{375}	—	October 6, 2012	Mount Lemmon	Mount Lemmon Survey	LIX	2.3 km	MPC · JPL
780519	2012 TU_{375}	—	October 9, 2012	Mount Lemmon	Mount Lemmon Survey	·	1.4 km	MPC · JPL
780520	2012 TD_{377}	—	October 8, 2012	Haleakala	Pan-STARRS 1	·	1.7 km	MPC · JPL
780521	2012 TB_{379}	—	October 13, 2012	Catalina	CSS	·	1.5 km	MPC · JPL
780522	2012 TC_{379}	—	August 31, 1998	Kitt Peak	Spacewatch	·	1.4 km	MPC · JPL
780523	2012 TS_{381}	—	October 10, 2012	Mount Lemmon	Mount Lemmon Survey	·	2.3 km	MPC · JPL
780524	2012 TK_{383}	—	October 11, 2012	Haleakala	Pan-STARRS 1	·	1.3 km	MPC · JPL
780525	2012 TA_{384}	—	October 11, 2012	Mount Lemmon	Mount Lemmon Survey	·	1.9 km	MPC · JPL
780526	2012 TC_{386}	—	October 11, 2012	Haleakala	Pan-STARRS 1	·	1.3 km	MPC · JPL
780527	2012 TA_{387}	—	October 10, 2012	Mount Lemmon	Mount Lemmon Survey	EOS	1.4 km	MPC · JPL
780528	2012 TT_{387}	—	October 8, 2012	Haleakala	Pan-STARRS 1	·	1.9 km	MPC · JPL
780529	2012 TP_{388}	—	October 8, 2012	Mount Lemmon	Mount Lemmon Survey	·	1.7 km	MPC · JPL
780530	2012 TT_{388}	—	October 9, 2012	Mount Lemmon	Mount Lemmon Survey	EOS	1.3 km	MPC · JPL
780531	2012 TO_{391}	—	October 8, 2012	Haleakala	Pan-STARRS 1	EOS	1.3 km	MPC · JPL
780532	2012 TS_{392}	—	October 11, 2012	Mount Lemmon	Mount Lemmon Survey	·	1.3 km	MPC · JPL
780533	2012 TW_{393}	—	October 11, 2012	Haleakala	Pan-STARRS 1	EOS	1.3 km	MPC · JPL
780534	2012 TQ_{394}	—	October 11, 2007	Kitt Peak	Spacewatch	·	1.6 km	MPC · JPL
780535	2012 TA_{396}	—	October 5, 2012	Haleakala	Pan-STARRS 1	·	1.8 km	MPC · JPL
780536	2012 TR_{398}	—	October 15, 2012	Haleakala	Pan-STARRS 1	·	2.4 km	MPC · JPL
780537	2012 TX_{400}	—	October 7, 2012	Haleakala	Pan-STARRS 1	·	2.0 km	MPC · JPL
780538	2012 TJ_{401}	—	October 9, 2012	Haleakala	Pan-STARRS 1	·	1.7 km	MPC · JPL
780539	2012 TT_{401}	—	October 10, 2012	Mount Lemmon	Mount Lemmon Survey	(43176)	1.6 km	MPC · JPL
780540	2012 TK_{402}	—	October 8, 2012	Haleakala	Pan-STARRS 1	·	2.5 km	MPC · JPL
780541	2012 TA_{404}	—	October 10, 2012	Haleakala	Pan-STARRS 1	·	1.8 km	MPC · JPL
780542	2012 TR_{404}	—	October 10, 2012	Mount Lemmon	Mount Lemmon Survey	EOS	1.1 km	MPC · JPL
780543	2012 TU_{404}	—	October 8, 2012	Haleakala	Pan-STARRS 1	HYG	1.7 km	MPC · JPL
780544	2012 TR_{405}	—	October 8, 2012	Haleakala	Pan-STARRS 1	EOS	1.4 km	MPC · JPL
780545	2012 UR_{2}	—	October 8, 2012	Mount Lemmon	Mount Lemmon Survey	·	1.5 km	MPC · JPL
780546	2012 UD_{6}	—	October 16, 2012	Mount Lemmon	Mount Lemmon Survey	·	740 m	MPC · JPL
780547	2012 UJ_{11}	—	October 8, 2012	Mount Lemmon	Mount Lemmon Survey	EMA	2.1 km	MPC · JPL
780548	2012 UW_{14}	—	October 6, 2012	Mount Lemmon	Mount Lemmon Survey	·	1.9 km	MPC · JPL
780549	2012 UK_{19}	—	October 16, 2012	Mount Lemmon	Mount Lemmon Survey	·	1.8 km	MPC · JPL
780550	2012 UC_{20}	—	October 8, 2012	Mount Lemmon	Mount Lemmon Survey	·	1.8 km	MPC · JPL
780551	2012 UK_{27}	—	October 8, 2012	Nogales	M. Schwartz, P. R. Holvorcem	ADE	1.7 km	MPC · JPL
780552	2012 UQ_{28}	—	October 16, 2012	Kitt Peak	Spacewatch	·	2.2 km	MPC · JPL
780553	2012 UC_{31}	—	October 16, 2012	Kitt Peak	Spacewatch	·	2.0 km	MPC · JPL
780554	2012 UE_{31}	—	October 16, 2012	Kitt Peak	Spacewatch	·	1.9 km	MPC · JPL
780555	2012 UZ_{43}	—	October 17, 2012	Mount Lemmon	Mount Lemmon Survey	·	2.8 km	MPC · JPL
780556	2012 UB_{44}	—	September 16, 2012	Parc National des Cévennes	Lopez, J.-M.	·	2.5 km	MPC · JPL
780557	2012 UE_{47}	—	October 18, 2012	Haleakala	Pan-STARRS 1	·	710 m	MPC · JPL
780558	2012 UV_{48}	—	October 8, 2012	Kitt Peak	Spacewatch	EUP	2.0 km	MPC · JPL
780559	2012 UU_{49}	—	October 8, 2012	Kitt Peak	Spacewatch	·	1.9 km	MPC · JPL
780560	2012 UW_{51}	—	October 18, 2012	Haleakala	Pan-STARRS 1	·	1.5 km	MPC · JPL
780561	2012 UE_{67}	—	October 20, 2012	Haleakala	Pan-STARRS 1	·	710 m	MPC · JPL
780562	2012 UV_{72}	—	September 11, 1994	Kitt Peak	Spacewatch	·	1.2 km	MPC · JPL
780563	2012 UX_{72}	—	September 25, 2012	Mount Lemmon	Mount Lemmon Survey	·	2.1 km	MPC · JPL
780564	2012 UN_{73}	—	October 17, 2012	Haleakala	Pan-STARRS 1	·	1.7 km	MPC · JPL
780565	2012 UY_{73}	—	October 17, 2012	Haleakala	Pan-STARRS 1	·	1.7 km	MPC · JPL
780566	2012 UG_{74}	—	October 10, 2012	Kitt Peak	Spacewatch	THM	1.7 km	MPC · JPL
780567	2012 UR_{74}	—	October 8, 2012	Kitt Peak	Spacewatch	THB	1.7 km	MPC · JPL
780568	2012 UT_{74}	—	October 14, 2012	Kitt Peak	Spacewatch	(12739)	1.2 km	MPC · JPL
780569	2012 UG_{75}	—	October 10, 2012	Kitt Peak	Spacewatch	·	2.3 km	MPC · JPL
780570	2012 UZ_{76}	—	October 18, 2012	Haleakala	Pan-STARRS 1	·	2.1 km	MPC · JPL
780571	2012 UZ_{78}	—	August 28, 2012	Mount Lemmon	Mount Lemmon Survey	·	1.4 km	MPC · JPL
780572	2012 UH_{80}	—	October 14, 2012	Kitt Peak	Spacewatch	·	1.3 km	MPC · JPL
780573	2012 UA_{82}	—	October 20, 2012	Kitt Peak	Spacewatch	·	2.2 km	MPC · JPL
780574	2012 UE_{82}	—	October 20, 2012	Kitt Peak	Spacewatch	·	2.0 km	MPC · JPL
780575	2012 UM_{82}	—	October 20, 2012	Kitt Peak	Spacewatch	·	2.1 km	MPC · JPL
780576	2012 UZ_{86}	—	October 21, 2012	Haleakala	Pan-STARRS 1	THB	2.0 km	MPC · JPL
780577	2012 UQ_{91}	—	December 5, 2007	Kitt Peak	Spacewatch	THM	1.4 km	MPC · JPL
780578	2012 UP_{93}	—	October 17, 2012	Mount Lemmon	Mount Lemmon Survey	(31811)	2.3 km	MPC · JPL
780579	2012 UF_{96}	—	October 17, 2012	Haleakala	Pan-STARRS 1	·	2.1 km	MPC · JPL
780580	2012 UC_{98}	—	October 16, 2012	Mount Lemmon	Mount Lemmon Survey	·	2.0 km	MPC · JPL
780581	2012 UC_{100}	—	November 19, 2008	Kitt Peak	Spacewatch	·	900 m	MPC · JPL
780582	2012 UA_{107}	—	October 19, 2012	Haleakala	Pan-STARRS 1	·	2.3 km	MPC · JPL
780583	2012 UR_{107}	—	October 8, 2012	Mount Lemmon	Mount Lemmon Survey	·	1.9 km	MPC · JPL
780584	2012 UV_{115}	—	October 22, 2012	Mount Lemmon	Mount Lemmon Survey	URS	2.0 km	MPC · JPL
780585	2012 UE_{121}	—	August 28, 2006	Kitt Peak	Spacewatch	·	1.9 km	MPC · JPL
780586	2012 UG_{126}	—	October 10, 2012	Mount Lemmon	Mount Lemmon Survey	3:2	3.9 km	MPC · JPL
780587	2012 UY_{128}	—	October 18, 2012	Mount Lemmon	Mount Lemmon Survey	EMA	2.1 km	MPC · JPL
780588	2012 UR_{129}	—	October 19, 2012	Mount Lemmon	Mount Lemmon Survey	EOS	1.3 km	MPC · JPL
780589	2012 US_{129}	—	October 19, 2012	Mount Lemmon	Mount Lemmon Survey	·	1.9 km	MPC · JPL
780590	2012 UA_{140}	—	October 10, 2012	Mount Lemmon	Mount Lemmon Survey	·	1.2 km	MPC · JPL
780591	2012 UF_{142}	—	November 2, 2007	Kitt Peak	Spacewatch	EOS	1.4 km	MPC · JPL
780592	2012 UG_{149}	—	October 21, 2012	Kitt Peak	Spacewatch	NEM	1.5 km	MPC · JPL
780593	2012 UJ_{154}	—	August 31, 2006	Mauna Kea	Veillet, C.	·	1.3 km	MPC · JPL
780594	2012 UC_{156}	—	October 11, 2012	Haleakala	Pan-STARRS 1	·	1.3 km	MPC · JPL
780595	2012 UX_{164}	—	October 23, 2012	Haleakala	Pan-STARRS 1	·	2.2 km	MPC · JPL
780596	2012 UC_{165}	—	October 23, 2012	Haleakala	Pan-STARRS 1	ADE	1.6 km	MPC · JPL
780597	2012 UQ_{165}	—	October 23, 2012	Haleakala	Pan-STARRS 1	·	1.5 km	MPC · JPL
780598	2012 UE_{173}	—	October 25, 2012	Piszkés-tető	K. Sárneczky, T. Vorobjov	·	2.6 km	MPC · JPL
780599	2012 UF_{173}	—	October 22, 2012	Haleakala	Pan-STARRS 1	EMA	2.4 km	MPC · JPL
780600	2012 UJ_{173}	—	December 17, 2007	Mount Lemmon	Mount Lemmon Survey	·	2.1 km	MPC · JPL

== 780601–780700 ==
back to top

Designation			Discovery			Properties		Ref
Permanent	Provisional	Named after	Date	Site	Discoverer(s)	Category	Diam.	Ref
780601	2012 UQ_{174}	—	September 24, 2012	Mount Lemmon	Mount Lemmon Survey	·	1.6 km	MPC · JPL
780602	2012 UH_{176}	—	February 1, 2009	Mount Lemmon	Mount Lemmon Survey	·	1.4 km	MPC · JPL
780603	2012 UE_{179}	—	October 21, 2012	Haleakala	Pan-STARRS 1	HYG	1.7 km	MPC · JPL
780604	2012 US_{184}	—	October 18, 2012	Haleakala	Pan-STARRS 1	EOS	1.4 km	MPC · JPL
780605	2012 UD_{185}	—	October 23, 2012	Haleakala	Pan-STARRS 1	NT	172 km	MPC · JPL
780606	2012 UL_{186}	—	October 27, 2012	Mount Lemmon	Mount Lemmon Survey	·	2.7 km	MPC · JPL
780607	2012 UA_{188}	—	December 10, 2013	Mount Lemmon	Mount Lemmon Survey	EOS	1.6 km	MPC · JPL
780608	2012 UL_{188}	—	October 18, 2012	Haleakala	Pan-STARRS 1	·	840 m	MPC · JPL
780609	2012 UR_{188}	—	July 11, 2016	Haleakala	Pan-STARRS 1	·	1.6 km	MPC · JPL
780610	2012 UR_{189}	—	October 19, 2012	Haleakala	Pan-STARRS 1	VER	2.0 km	MPC · JPL
780611	2012 UW_{189}	—	October 18, 2012	Haleakala	Pan-STARRS 1	·	1.7 km	MPC · JPL
780612	2012 UJ_{191}	—	October 21, 2012	Haleakala	Pan-STARRS 1	·	1.8 km	MPC · JPL
780613	2012 UT_{192}	—	October 18, 2012	Mount Lemmon	Mount Lemmon Survey	·	2.1 km	MPC · JPL
780614	2012 UL_{193}	—	October 18, 2012	Haleakala	Pan-STARRS 1	·	2.0 km	MPC · JPL
780615	2012 UZ_{193}	—	October 18, 2012	Haleakala	Pan-STARRS 1	·	1.7 km	MPC · JPL
780616	2012 UP_{195}	—	October 22, 2012	Haleakala	Pan-STARRS 1	·	2.4 km	MPC · JPL
780617	2012 UB_{196}	—	October 22, 2012	Haleakala	Pan-STARRS 1	·	2.1 km	MPC · JPL
780618	2012 UQ_{199}	—	February 26, 2014	Haleakala	Pan-STARRS 1	·	2.1 km	MPC · JPL
780619	2012 UW_{199}	—	October 20, 2012	Haleakala	Pan-STARRS 1	·	2.3 km	MPC · JPL
780620	2012 UB_{200}	—	October 26, 2012	Haleakala	Pan-STARRS 1	·	2.2 km	MPC · JPL
780621	2012 US_{200}	—	October 26, 2012	Mount Lemmon	Mount Lemmon Survey	·	1.8 km	MPC · JPL
780622	2012 UA_{201}	—	September 15, 2017	Haleakala	Pan-STARRS 1	·	2.2 km	MPC · JPL
780623	2012 UQ_{201}	—	June 11, 2015	Haleakala	Pan-STARRS 1	T_{j} (2.98)	3.0 km	MPC · JPL
780624	2012 UX_{201}	—	October 19, 2012	Haleakala	Pan-STARRS 1	T_{j} (2.97) · 3:2	4.0 km	MPC · JPL
780625	2012 UD_{203}	—	October 21, 2012	Mount Lemmon	Mount Lemmon Survey	·	2.3 km	MPC · JPL
780626	2012 UR_{203}	—	October 18, 2012	Haleakala	Pan-STARRS 1	·	2.1 km	MPC · JPL
780627	2012 UZ_{204}	—	October 21, 2012	Mount Lemmon	Mount Lemmon Survey	LIX	2.2 km	MPC · JPL
780628	2012 UJ_{205}	—	October 18, 2012	Haleakala	Pan-STARRS 1	THM	1.7 km	MPC · JPL
780629	2012 UK_{206}	—	October 17, 2012	Haleakala	Pan-STARRS 1	·	880 m	MPC · JPL
780630	2012 UE_{207}	—	October 19, 2012	Mount Lemmon	Mount Lemmon Survey	·	1.5 km	MPC · JPL
780631	2012 UN_{207}	—	October 16, 2012	Mount Lemmon	Mount Lemmon Survey	·	2.2 km	MPC · JPL
780632	2012 UA_{208}	—	October 19, 2012	Mount Lemmon	Mount Lemmon Survey	·	1.4 km	MPC · JPL
780633	2012 UG_{208}	—	July 12, 2018	Haleakala	Pan-STARRS 2	·	3.0 km	MPC · JPL
780634	2012 UH_{208}	—	October 20, 2012	Kitt Peak	Spacewatch	·	1.8 km	MPC · JPL
780635	2012 UG_{211}	—	October 22, 2012	Haleakala	Pan-STARRS 1	·	1.9 km	MPC · JPL
780636	2012 UF_{212}	—	October 18, 2012	Haleakala	Pan-STARRS 1	·	2.0 km	MPC · JPL
780637	2012 UR_{212}	—	October 22, 2012	Haleakala	Pan-STARRS 1	·	2.5 km	MPC · JPL
780638	2012 UN_{213}	—	October 16, 2012	Mount Lemmon	Mount Lemmon Survey	KOR	910 m	MPC · JPL
780639	2012 UE_{214}	—	October 17, 2012	Haleakala	Pan-STARRS 1	·	1.3 km	MPC · JPL
780640	2012 UM_{214}	—	October 20, 2012	Kitt Peak	Spacewatch	TIR	1.8 km	MPC · JPL
780641	2012 UN_{214}	—	October 17, 2012	Mount Lemmon	Mount Lemmon Survey	·	2.3 km	MPC · JPL
780642	2012 UX_{214}	—	October 18, 2012	Haleakala	Pan-STARRS 1	·	1.7 km	MPC · JPL
780643	2012 UR_{215}	—	October 20, 2012	Kitt Peak	Spacewatch	·	2.7 km	MPC · JPL
780644	2012 UJ_{218}	—	October 18, 2012	Haleakala	Pan-STARRS 1	·	1.1 km	MPC · JPL
780645	2012 UN_{218}	—	October 17, 2012	Haleakala	Pan-STARRS 1	·	1.9 km	MPC · JPL
780646	2012 UQ_{218}	—	October 16, 2012	Mount Lemmon	Mount Lemmon Survey	·	1.9 km	MPC · JPL
780647	2012 UZ_{218}	—	October 26, 2012	Mount Lemmon	Mount Lemmon Survey	·	2.7 km	MPC · JPL
780648	2012 UO_{220}	—	October 16, 2012	Mount Lemmon	Mount Lemmon Survey	·	2.0 km	MPC · JPL
780649	2012 UQ_{220}	—	October 16, 2012	Mount Lemmon	Mount Lemmon Survey	EOS	1.5 km	MPC · JPL
780650	2012 UP_{223}	—	October 22, 2012	Haleakala	Pan-STARRS 1	·	1.5 km	MPC · JPL
780651	2012 UA_{225}	—	October 23, 2012	Mount Lemmon	Mount Lemmon Survey	EUN	830 m	MPC · JPL
780652	2012 UJ_{228}	—	October 17, 2012	Haleakala	Pan-STARRS 1	EOS	1.4 km	MPC · JPL
780653	2012 UC_{229}	—	October 17, 2012	Haleakala	Pan-STARRS 1	·	2.0 km	MPC · JPL
780654	2012 UK_{229}	—	October 18, 2012	Haleakala	Pan-STARRS 1	·	900 m	MPC · JPL
780655	2012 UE_{230}	—	October 18, 2012	Haleakala	Pan-STARRS 1	·	2.0 km	MPC · JPL
780656	2012 UF_{230}	—	October 16, 2012	Mount Lemmon	Mount Lemmon Survey	EOS	1.3 km	MPC · JPL
780657	2012 UG_{230}	—	October 16, 2012	Mount Lemmon	Mount Lemmon Survey	·	2.2 km	MPC · JPL
780658	2012 UH_{230}	—	October 17, 2012	Haleakala	Pan-STARRS 1	HYG	1.7 km	MPC · JPL
780659	2012 UJ_{230}	—	October 16, 2012	Mount Lemmon	Mount Lemmon Survey	·	1.2 km	MPC · JPL
780660	2012 UO_{230}	—	October 17, 2012	Mount Lemmon	Mount Lemmon Survey	·	2.0 km	MPC · JPL
780661	2012 UY_{230}	—	October 17, 2012	Mount Lemmon	Mount Lemmon Survey	·	2.1 km	MPC · JPL
780662	2012 UF_{231}	—	October 22, 2012	Haleakala	Pan-STARRS 1	·	2.0 km	MPC · JPL
780663	2012 UH_{233}	—	October 23, 2012	Mount Lemmon	Mount Lemmon Survey	·	1.4 km	MPC · JPL
780664	2012 UJ_{233}	—	October 23, 2012	Kitt Peak	Spacewatch	·	2.0 km	MPC · JPL
780665	2012 UK_{233}	—	October 21, 2012	Mount Lemmon	Mount Lemmon Survey	(5)	930 m	MPC · JPL
780666	2012 UN_{234}	—	October 18, 2012	Haleakala	Pan-STARRS 1	·	2.1 km	MPC · JPL
780667	2012 UR_{234}	—	October 18, 2012	Haleakala	Pan-STARRS 1	EOS	1.3 km	MPC · JPL
780668	2012 UZ_{234}	—	October 18, 2012	Haleakala	Pan-STARRS 1	·	2.0 km	MPC · JPL
780669	2012 UX_{238}	—	October 19, 2012	Mount Lemmon	Mount Lemmon Survey	·	1.2 km	MPC · JPL
780670	2012 UQ_{243}	—	October 17, 2012	Haleakala	Pan-STARRS 1	·	1.3 km	MPC · JPL
780671	2012 UU_{243}	—	October 22, 2012	Haleakala	Pan-STARRS 1	EOS	1.7 km	MPC · JPL
780672	2012 UX_{243}	—	October 26, 2012	Mount Lemmon	Mount Lemmon Survey	·	1.6 km	MPC · JPL
780673	2012 UC_{244}	—	November 8, 2007	Mount Lemmon	Mount Lemmon Survey	EOS	1.3 km	MPC · JPL
780674	2012 UN_{244}	—	October 17, 2012	Mount Lemmon	Mount Lemmon Survey	·	1.4 km	MPC · JPL
780675	2012 UR_{245}	—	October 21, 2012	Haleakala	Pan-STARRS 1	·	2.0 km	MPC · JPL
780676	2012 UC_{246}	—	October 22, 2012	Mount Lemmon	Mount Lemmon Survey	·	1.3 km	MPC · JPL
780677	2012 UU_{247}	—	October 21, 2012	Haleakala	Pan-STARRS 1	·	1.1 km	MPC · JPL
780678	2012 UP_{248}	—	October 18, 2012	Haleakala	Pan-STARRS 1	EOS	1.4 km	MPC · JPL
780679	2012 UA_{250}	—	October 17, 2012	Mount Lemmon	Mount Lemmon Survey	·	2.0 km	MPC · JPL
780680	2012 UB_{250}	—	October 19, 2012	Haleakala	Pan-STARRS 1	·	1.5 km	MPC · JPL
780681	2012 UJ_{250}	—	October 25, 2012	Mount Lemmon	Mount Lemmon Survey	EOS	1.3 km	MPC · JPL
780682	2012 UQ_{250}	—	November 3, 2012	Haleakala	Pan-STARRS 1	·	1.9 km	MPC · JPL
780683	2012 UR_{250}	—	October 17, 2012	Haleakala	Pan-STARRS 1	EOS	1.3 km	MPC · JPL
780684	2012 UE_{251}	—	October 22, 2012	Haleakala	Pan-STARRS 1	EOS	1.5 km	MPC · JPL
780685	2012 UD_{252}	—	October 18, 2012	Haleakala	Pan-STARRS 1	·	1.2 km	MPC · JPL
780686	2012 UV_{253}	—	October 18, 2012	Haleakala	Pan-STARRS 1	·	2.1 km	MPC · JPL
780687	2012 UW_{253}	—	October 22, 2012	Mount Lemmon	Mount Lemmon Survey	·	1.8 km	MPC · JPL
780688	2012 UU_{254}	—	October 23, 2012	Haleakala	Pan-STARRS 1	EOS	1.3 km	MPC · JPL
780689	2012 UA_{256}	—	October 16, 2012	Mount Lemmon	Mount Lemmon Survey	L5	6.4 km	MPC · JPL
780690	2012 UG_{256}	—	September 5, 2000	Apache Point	SDSS	·	2.0 km	MPC · JPL
780691	2012 UT_{256}	—	October 16, 2012	Mount Lemmon	Mount Lemmon Survey	T_{j} (2.98)	1.9 km	MPC · JPL
780692	2012 UJ_{257}	—	October 17, 2012	Haleakala	Pan-STARRS 1	L5	5.9 km	MPC · JPL
780693	2012 UK_{257}	—	October 18, 2012	Haleakala	Pan-STARRS 1	·	2.0 km	MPC · JPL
780694	2012 UD_{258}	—	October 24, 2012	Haleakala	Pan-STARRS 1	·	2.2 km	MPC · JPL
780695	2012 UV_{258}	—	October 18, 2012	Haleakala	Pan-STARRS 1	·	2.0 km	MPC · JPL
780696	2012 UF_{259}	—	October 17, 2012	Mount Lemmon	Mount Lemmon Survey	URS	1.9 km	MPC · JPL
780697	2012 UJ_{259}	—	October 19, 2012	Mount Lemmon	Mount Lemmon Survey	·	2.0 km	MPC · JPL
780698	2012 UY_{259}	—	October 23, 2012	Mount Lemmon	Mount Lemmon Survey	EUP	2.1 km	MPC · JPL
780699	2012 UG_{260}	—	October 20, 2012	Haleakala	Pan-STARRS 1	TIR	1.6 km	MPC · JPL
780700	2012 UP_{260}	—	October 19, 2012	Mount Lemmon	Mount Lemmon Survey	·	2.1 km	MPC · JPL

== 780701–780800 ==
back to top

Designation			Discovery			Properties		Ref
Permanent	Provisional	Named after	Date	Site	Discoverer(s)	Category	Diam.	Ref
780701	2012 UA_{261}	—	October 19, 2012	Mount Lemmon	Mount Lemmon Survey	·	1.7 km	MPC · JPL
780702	2012 UV_{261}	—	October 22, 2012	Haleakala	Pan-STARRS 1	·	1.9 km	MPC · JPL
780703	2012 UD_{263}	—	October 20, 2012	Mount Lemmon	Mount Lemmon Survey	EOS	1.4 km	MPC · JPL
780704	2012 UL_{263}	—	October 17, 2012	Haleakala	Pan-STARRS 1	·	1.6 km	MPC · JPL
780705	2012 UN_{263}	—	October 18, 2012	Haleakala	Pan-STARRS 1	EOS	1.4 km	MPC · JPL
780706	2012 US_{267}	—	October 17, 2012	Mount Lemmon	Mount Lemmon Survey	·	2.5 km	MPC · JPL
780707	2012 UA_{268}	—	October 17, 2012	Haleakala	Pan-STARRS 1	L5	6.5 km	MPC · JPL
780708	2012 UE_{268}	—	October 18, 2012	Haleakala	Pan-STARRS 1	·	1.2 km	MPC · JPL
780709	2012 UL_{268}	—	October 20, 2012	Kitt Peak	Spacewatch	·	2.0 km	MPC · JPL
780710	2012 VK	—	November 1, 2012	Haleakala	Pan-STARRS 1	·	2.0 km	MPC · JPL
780711	2012 VP_{3}	—	November 3, 2012	Mount Lemmon	Mount Lemmon Survey	KOR	1.1 km	MPC · JPL
780712	2012 VM_{8}	—	November 2, 2012	Haleakala	Pan-STARRS 1	·	1.6 km	MPC · JPL
780713	2012 VZ_{8}	—	October 20, 2012	Kitt Peak	Spacewatch	·	1.1 km	MPC · JPL
780714	2012 VC_{9}	—	October 6, 2012	Mount Lemmon	Mount Lemmon Survey	·	1.9 km	MPC · JPL
780715	2012 VQ_{11}	—	October 5, 2012	Kitt Peak	Spacewatch	·	2.2 km	MPC · JPL
780716	2012 VW_{11}	—	October 18, 2012	Haleakala	Pan-STARRS 1	·	1.5 km	MPC · JPL
780717	2012 VD_{14}	—	November 4, 2012	Mount Lemmon	Mount Lemmon Survey	·	1.7 km	MPC · JPL
780718	2012 VZ_{14}	—	November 4, 2012	Haleakala	Pan-STARRS 1	EOS	1.3 km	MPC · JPL
780719	2012 VE_{15}	—	November 4, 2007	Mount Lemmon	Mount Lemmon Survey	·	1.9 km	MPC · JPL
780720	2012 VU_{17}	—	October 17, 2012	Mount Lemmon	Mount Lemmon Survey	EOS	1.6 km	MPC · JPL
780721	2012 VL_{22}	—	October 20, 2012	Kitt Peak	Spacewatch	·	1.9 km	MPC · JPL
780722	2012 VS_{22}	—	November 4, 2012	Mount Lemmon	Mount Lemmon Survey	·	2.1 km	MPC · JPL
780723	2012 VW_{23}	—	November 4, 2012	Mount Lemmon	Mount Lemmon Survey	·	1.0 km	MPC · JPL
780724	2012 VL_{24}	—	October 20, 2012	Kitt Peak	Spacewatch	·	1.1 km	MPC · JPL
780725	2012 VN_{24}	—	October 20, 2012	Kitt Peak	Spacewatch	·	2.3 km	MPC · JPL
780726	2012 VX_{27}	—	November 2, 2012	Mount Lemmon	Mount Lemmon Survey	·	1.1 km	MPC · JPL
780727	2012 VP_{29}	—	November 2, 2012	Mount Lemmon	Mount Lemmon Survey	·	1.2 km	MPC · JPL
780728	2012 VO_{37}	—	October 17, 2012	Haleakala	Pan-STARRS 1	·	1.9 km	MPC · JPL
780729	2012 VF_{41}	—	October 31, 2007	Mount Lemmon	Mount Lemmon Survey	EOS	1.3 km	MPC · JPL
780730	2012 VB_{47}	—	November 6, 2012	Mount Lemmon	Mount Lemmon Survey	·	1.3 km	MPC · JPL
780731	2012 VH_{47}	—	October 8, 2012	Haleakala	Pan-STARRS 1	·	2.0 km	MPC · JPL
780732	2012 VJ_{49}	—	October 8, 2012	Kitt Peak	Spacewatch	·	860 m	MPC · JPL
780733	2012 VX_{50}	—	October 8, 2012	Haleakala	Pan-STARRS 1	·	2.4 km	MPC · JPL
780734	2012 VJ_{59}	—	October 20, 2012	Kitt Peak	Spacewatch	THM	1.7 km	MPC · JPL
780735	2012 VE_{61}	—	October 14, 2012	Kitt Peak	Spacewatch	·	2.1 km	MPC · JPL
780736	2012 VN_{62}	—	October 14, 2012	Catalina	CSS	·	1.1 km	MPC · JPL
780737	2012 VP_{67}	—	September 18, 2012	Mount Lemmon	Mount Lemmon Survey	·	2.1 km	MPC · JPL
780738	2012 VL_{68}	—	October 18, 2012	Haleakala	Pan-STARRS 1	·	1.9 km	MPC · JPL
780739	2012 VB_{85}	—	November 14, 2012	Kitt Peak	Spacewatch	·	1.5 km	MPC · JPL
780740	2012 VC_{86}	—	December 28, 2005	Mount Lemmon	Mount Lemmon Survey	3:2	3.3 km	MPC · JPL
780741	2012 VC_{87}	—	September 27, 2006	Kitt Peak	Spacewatch	·	2.2 km	MPC · JPL
780742	2012 VG_{90}	—	November 14, 2012	Kitt Peak	Spacewatch	·	2.4 km	MPC · JPL
780743	2012 VH_{95}	—	October 21, 2012	Haleakala	Pan-STARRS 1	·	1.5 km	MPC · JPL
780744	2012 VZ_{103}	—	January 22, 2006	Mount Lemmon	Mount Lemmon Survey	T_{j} (2.99) · 3:2 · SHU	3.7 km	MPC · JPL
780745	2012 VV_{105}	—	July 31, 2000	Cerro Tololo	Deep Ecliptic Survey	·	2.5 km	MPC · JPL
780746	2012 VC_{106}	—	October 22, 2012	Mount Lemmon	Mount Lemmon Survey	·	1.9 km	MPC · JPL
780747	2012 VH_{111}	—	November 7, 2012	Haleakala	Pan-STARRS 1	·	1.0 km	MPC · JPL
780748	2012 VP_{118}	—	November 7, 2012	Haleakala	Pan-STARRS 1	·	1.9 km	MPC · JPL
780749	2012 VE_{119}	—	January 24, 2014	Haleakala	Pan-STARRS 1	EOS	1.4 km	MPC · JPL
780750	2012 VW_{119}	—	November 7, 2012	Kitt Peak	Spacewatch	·	1.7 km	MPC · JPL
780751	2012 VK_{120}	—	November 7, 2012	Mount Lemmon	Mount Lemmon Survey	·	1.4 km	MPC · JPL
780752	2012 VW_{121}	—	October 9, 2007	Catalina	CSS	·	2.3 km	MPC · JPL
780753	2012 VZ_{124}	—	November 14, 2012	Mount Lemmon	Mount Lemmon Survey	·	1.8 km	MPC · JPL
780754	2012 VD_{125}	—	July 26, 2017	Haleakala	Pan-STARRS 1	·	2.5 km	MPC · JPL
780755	2012 VH_{125}	—	November 7, 2012	Mount Lemmon	Mount Lemmon Survey	·	1.9 km	MPC · JPL
780756	2012 VK_{126}	—	April 10, 2015	Kitt Peak	Spacewatch	·	2.2 km	MPC · JPL
780757	2012 VU_{126}	—	November 3, 2012	Mount Lemmon	Mount Lemmon Survey	·	2.0 km	MPC · JPL
780758	2012 VM_{127}	—	November 7, 2012	Kitt Peak	Spacewatch	·	1.9 km	MPC · JPL
780759	2012 VW_{127}	—	November 7, 2012	Kitt Peak	Spacewatch	·	2.2 km	MPC · JPL
780760	2012 VG_{128}	—	November 7, 2012	Haleakala	Pan-STARRS 1	·	1.4 km	MPC · JPL
780761	2012 VH_{128}	—	November 7, 2012	Mount Lemmon	Mount Lemmon Survey	·	2.0 km	MPC · JPL
780762	2012 VN_{128}	—	November 7, 2012	Mount Lemmon	Mount Lemmon Survey	MRX	730 m	MPC · JPL
780763	2012 VB_{133}	—	November 13, 2012	Mount Lemmon	Mount Lemmon Survey	·	880 m	MPC · JPL
780764	2012 VC_{133}	—	November 12, 2012	Mount Lemmon	Mount Lemmon Survey	·	1.0 km	MPC · JPL
780765	2012 VJ_{133}	—	November 7, 2012	Kitt Peak	Spacewatch	URS	2.7 km	MPC · JPL
780766	2012 VJ_{134}	—	November 2, 2012	Haleakala	Pan-STARRS 1	L5	6.6 km	MPC · JPL
780767	2012 VM_{134}	—	November 12, 2012	Mount Lemmon	Mount Lemmon Survey	·	2.3 km	MPC · JPL
780768	2012 VX_{135}	—	November 7, 2012	Mount Lemmon	Mount Lemmon Survey	·	1.8 km	MPC · JPL
780769	2012 VR_{140}	—	November 14, 2012	Kitt Peak	Spacewatch	·	960 m	MPC · JPL
780770	2012 VP_{146}	—	November 13, 2012	Mount Lemmon	Mount Lemmon Survey	·	1.7 km	MPC · JPL
780771	2012 WA_{1}	—	October 21, 2012	Kitt Peak	Spacewatch	·	2.4 km	MPC · JPL
780772	2012 WQ_{6}	—	November 12, 2012	Mount Lemmon	Mount Lemmon Survey	THB	2.0 km	MPC · JPL
780773	2012 WG_{8}	—	November 17, 2012	Mount Lemmon	Mount Lemmon Survey	·	2.5 km	MPC · JPL
780774	2012 WW_{10}	—	November 17, 2012	Westfield	International Astronomical Search Collaboration	·	1.5 km	MPC · JPL
780775	2012 WL_{13}	—	November 19, 2012	Kitt Peak	Spacewatch	·	2.2 km	MPC · JPL
780776	2012 WQ_{17}	—	October 22, 2012	Haleakala	Pan-STARRS 1	URS	2.4 km	MPC · JPL
780777	2012 WZ_{17}	—	October 22, 2012	Haleakala	Pan-STARRS 1	·	2.0 km	MPC · JPL
780778	2012 WK_{31}	—	November 17, 2012	Mount Lemmon	Mount Lemmon Survey	EOS	1.4 km	MPC · JPL
780779	2012 WJ_{33}	—	November 7, 2012	Mount Lemmon	Mount Lemmon Survey	·	2.5 km	MPC · JPL
780780	2012 WU_{35}	—	November 22, 2012	Kitt Peak	Spacewatch	·	1.0 km	MPC · JPL
780781	2012 WE_{38}	—	August 18, 2012	Mount Teide	E. Schwab	BRA	1.1 km	MPC · JPL
780782	2012 WC_{39}	—	November 20, 2012	Catalina	CSS	·	2.4 km	MPC · JPL
780783	2012 WO_{39}	—	November 23, 2012	Kitt Peak	Spacewatch	·	2.5 km	MPC · JPL
780784	2012 WB_{40}	—	November 22, 2012	Kitt Peak	Spacewatch	·	2.4 km	MPC · JPL
780785	2012 WA_{41}	—	November 23, 2012	Kitt Peak	Spacewatch	·	1.5 km	MPC · JPL
780786	2012 WC_{41}	—	November 17, 2012	Mount Lemmon	Mount Lemmon Survey	·	1.8 km	MPC · JPL
780787	2012 WG_{45}	—	November 19, 2012	Kitt Peak	Spacewatch	·	1.9 km	MPC · JPL
780788	2012 WV_{45}	—	November 17, 2012	Mount Lemmon	Mount Lemmon Survey	·	2.1 km	MPC · JPL
780789	2012 XU_{5}	—	December 4, 2008	Catalina	CSS	·	1.7 km	MPC · JPL
780790	2012 XD_{13}	—	October 25, 2012	Mount Lemmon	Mount Lemmon Survey	EOS	1.5 km	MPC · JPL
780791	2012 XV_{13}	—	November 7, 2012	Mount Lemmon	Mount Lemmon Survey	·	1.7 km	MPC · JPL
780792	2012 XN_{17}	—	November 11, 2012	Front Royal	Skillman, D.	EOS	1.5 km	MPC · JPL
780793	2012 XF_{18}	—	October 21, 2012	Haleakala	Pan-STARRS 1	·	2.0 km	MPC · JPL
780794	2012 XO_{23}	—	December 3, 2012	Mount Lemmon	Mount Lemmon Survey	AGN	930 m	MPC · JPL
780795	2012 XN_{24}	—	December 5, 2007	Kitt Peak	Spacewatch	·	1.8 km	MPC · JPL
780796	2012 XF_{27}	—	December 3, 2012	Mount Lemmon	Mount Lemmon Survey	EOS	1.4 km	MPC · JPL
780797	2012 XC_{37}	—	January 16, 2008	Kitt Peak	Spacewatch	THM	1.6 km	MPC · JPL
780798	2012 XO_{37}	—	December 3, 2012	Mount Lemmon	Mount Lemmon Survey	·	1.2 km	MPC · JPL
780799	2012 XC_{41}	—	December 3, 2012	Mount Lemmon	Mount Lemmon Survey	·	1.1 km	MPC · JPL
780800	2012 XF_{41}	—	December 3, 2012	Mount Lemmon	Mount Lemmon Survey	·	2.2 km	MPC · JPL

== 780801–780900 ==
back to top

Designation			Discovery			Properties		Ref
Permanent	Provisional	Named after	Date	Site	Discoverer(s)	Category	Diam.	Ref
780801	2012 XH_{41}	—	December 3, 2012	Mount Lemmon	Mount Lemmon Survey	·	1.7 km	MPC · JPL
780802	2012 XW_{41}	—	December 3, 2012	Mount Lemmon	Mount Lemmon Survey	·	2.2 km	MPC · JPL
780803	2012 XQ_{42}	—	November 7, 2007	Kitt Peak	Spacewatch	·	1.4 km	MPC · JPL
780804	2012 XY_{45}	—	October 20, 2012	Kitt Peak	Spacewatch	·	1.9 km	MPC · JPL
780805	2012 XE_{52}	—	December 6, 2012	Mount Lemmon	Mount Lemmon Survey	LIX	2.6 km	MPC · JPL
780806	2012 XZ_{52}	—	December 6, 2012	Kitt Peak	Spacewatch	·	2.5 km	MPC · JPL
780807	2012 XN_{57}	—	October 30, 2008	Kitt Peak	Spacewatch	·	870 m	MPC · JPL
780808	2012 XB_{58}	—	December 3, 2012	Mount Lemmon	Mount Lemmon Survey	·	1.8 km	MPC · JPL
780809	2012 XV_{59}	—	October 22, 2012	Kitt Peak	Spacewatch	·	2.0 km	MPC · JPL
780810	2012 XL_{61}	—	October 22, 2012	Haleakala	Pan-STARRS 1	·	1.9 km	MPC · JPL
780811	2012 XB_{62}	—	December 4, 2012	Mount Lemmon	Mount Lemmon Survey	·	2.3 km	MPC · JPL
780812	2012 XW_{71}	—	December 6, 2012	Mount Lemmon	Mount Lemmon Survey	·	1.9 km	MPC · JPL
780813	2012 XS_{79}	—	December 6, 2012	Mount Lemmon	Mount Lemmon Survey	·	2.3 km	MPC · JPL
780814	2012 XT_{81}	—	December 6, 2012	Mount Lemmon	Mount Lemmon Survey	THB	2.3 km	MPC · JPL
780815	2012 XB_{82}	—	November 7, 2012	Mount Lemmon	Mount Lemmon Survey	·	1.9 km	MPC · JPL
780816	2012 XJ_{82}	—	December 6, 2012	Mount Lemmon	Mount Lemmon Survey	·	1.9 km	MPC · JPL
780817	2012 XX_{83}	—	December 6, 2012	Kitt Peak	Spacewatch	·	3.1 km	MPC · JPL
780818	2012 XW_{84}	—	December 7, 2012	Haleakala	Pan-STARRS 1	·	2.3 km	MPC · JPL
780819	2012 XG_{90}	—	May 4, 2009	Mount Lemmon	Mount Lemmon Survey	TIR	2.1 km	MPC · JPL
780820	2012 XN_{92}	—	December 8, 2012	Mount Lemmon	Mount Lemmon Survey	·	2.0 km	MPC · JPL
780821	2012 XO_{102}	—	December 31, 2007	Kitt Peak	Spacewatch	·	1.9 km	MPC · JPL
780822	2012 XT_{102}	—	November 1, 2006	Mount Lemmon	Mount Lemmon Survey	·	2.0 km	MPC · JPL
780823	2012 XA_{104}	—	April 21, 2009	Mount Lemmon	Mount Lemmon Survey	·	2.5 km	MPC · JPL
780824	2012 XF_{108}	—	December 8, 2012	Mount Lemmon	Mount Lemmon Survey	·	970 m	MPC · JPL
780825	2012 XM_{114}	—	December 6, 2012	Mount Lemmon	Mount Lemmon Survey	(5)	800 m	MPC · JPL
780826	2012 XT_{115}	—	December 7, 2012	Nogales	M. Schwartz, P. R. Holvorcem	EUP	2.9 km	MPC · JPL
780827	2012 XV_{129}	—	December 11, 2012	Mount Lemmon	Mount Lemmon Survey	·	1.8 km	MPC · JPL
780828	2012 XC_{130}	—	February 9, 2008	Mount Lemmon	Mount Lemmon Survey	·	2.8 km	MPC · JPL
780829	2012 XD_{130}	—	December 11, 2012	Mount Lemmon	Mount Lemmon Survey	·	2.0 km	MPC · JPL
780830	2012 XF_{148}	—	November 7, 2012	Mount Lemmon	Mount Lemmon Survey	·	1.3 km	MPC · JPL
780831	2012 XY_{153}	—	November 14, 2012	Mount Lemmon	Mount Lemmon Survey	·	2.3 km	MPC · JPL
780832	2012 XS_{158}	—	December 3, 2012	Mount Lemmon	Mount Lemmon Survey	·	2.3 km	MPC · JPL
780833	2012 XP_{160}	—	March 21, 2015	Haleakala	Pan-STARRS 1	EOS	1.7 km	MPC · JPL
780834	2012 XV_{160}	—	December 8, 2012	Mount Lemmon	Mount Lemmon Survey	·	2.6 km	MPC · JPL
780835	2012 XX_{161}	—	February 28, 2014	Haleakala	Pan-STARRS 1	·	2.0 km	MPC · JPL
780836	2012 XC_{162}	—	December 11, 2012	Mount Lemmon	Mount Lemmon Survey	·	2.5 km	MPC · JPL
780837	2012 XJ_{162}	—	December 5, 2012	Mount Lemmon	Mount Lemmon Survey	·	2.5 km	MPC · JPL
780838	2012 XY_{162}	—	December 7, 2012	San Pedro de Atacama	Oreshko, A.	TIR	1.9 km	MPC · JPL
780839	2012 XB_{164}	—	December 10, 2012	Kitt Peak	Spacewatch	·	2.7 km	MPC · JPL
780840	2012 XD_{166}	—	October 27, 2017	Haleakala	Pan-STARRS 1	·	2.0 km	MPC · JPL
780841	2012 XG_{166}	—	December 9, 2012	Haleakala	Pan-STARRS 1	·	1.7 km	MPC · JPL
780842	2012 XS_{166}	—	December 4, 2012	Mount Lemmon	Mount Lemmon Survey	·	2.5 km	MPC · JPL
780843	2012 XT_{166}	—	December 9, 2012	Mount Lemmon	Mount Lemmon Survey	·	2.2 km	MPC · JPL
780844	2012 XX_{166}	—	December 11, 2012	Calar Alto-CASADO	Mottola, S.	·	930 m	MPC · JPL
780845	2012 XL_{167}	—	June 11, 2015	Haleakala	Pan-STARRS 1	EOS	1.2 km	MPC · JPL
780846	2012 XK_{168}	—	December 8, 2012	Mount Lemmon	Mount Lemmon Survey	·	2.1 km	MPC · JPL
780847	2012 XN_{169}	—	December 11, 2012	Mount Lemmon	Mount Lemmon Survey	·	1.9 km	MPC · JPL
780848	2012 XK_{171}	—	December 12, 2012	Mount Lemmon	Mount Lemmon Survey	·	850 m	MPC · JPL
780849	2012 XN_{173}	—	December 8, 2012	Kitt Peak	Spacewatch	MAR	750 m	MPC · JPL
780850	2012 XP_{174}	—	December 12, 2012	Mount Lemmon	Mount Lemmon Survey	VER	2.1 km	MPC · JPL
780851	2012 XM_{175}	—	December 3, 2012	Mount Lemmon	Mount Lemmon Survey	·	2.2 km	MPC · JPL
780852	2012 XV_{178}	—	December 8, 2012	Mount Lemmon	Mount Lemmon Survey	·	1.5 km	MPC · JPL
780853	2012 XY_{178}	—	December 12, 2012	Mount Lemmon	Mount Lemmon Survey	TIR	2.2 km	MPC · JPL
780854	2012 XB_{179}	—	February 2, 2009	Catalina	CSS	·	1.2 km	MPC · JPL
780855	2012 XG_{179}	—	December 11, 2012	Mount Lemmon	Mount Lemmon Survey	·	1.6 km	MPC · JPL
780856	2012 XO_{179}	—	December 15, 2012	La Silla	La Silla	·	2.2 km	MPC · JPL
780857 Rodés	2012 XA_{180}	Rodés	December 8, 2012	Mount Graham	K. Černis, R. P. Boyle	·	2.0 km	MPC · JPL
780858	2012 XY_{180}	—	December 12, 2012	Mount Lemmon	Mount Lemmon Survey	·	2.3 km	MPC · JPL
780859	2012 YB_{10}	—	December 30, 2008	Mount Lemmon	Mount Lemmon Survey	·	930 m	MPC · JPL
780860	2012 YZ_{10}	—	December 23, 2012	Haleakala	Pan-STARRS 1	·	770 m	MPC · JPL
780861	2012 YM_{11}	—	December 31, 2008	Kitt Peak	Spacewatch	·	900 m	MPC · JPL
780862	2012 YP_{13}	—	October 15, 2017	Mount Lemmon	Mount Lemmon Survey	·	2.1 km	MPC · JPL
780863	2012 YV_{14}	—	December 22, 2012	Haleakala	Pan-STARRS 1	·	620 m	MPC · JPL
780864	2012 YK_{15}	—	December 23, 2012	Haleakala	Pan-STARRS 1	(895)	2.4 km	MPC · JPL
780865	2012 YF_{16}	—	December 22, 2012	Haleakala	Pan-STARRS 1	·	2.0 km	MPC · JPL
780866	2012 YJ_{16}	—	December 23, 2012	Haleakala	Pan-STARRS 1	·	2.5 km	MPC · JPL
780867	2012 YM_{16}	—	December 23, 2012	Haleakala	Pan-STARRS 1	L4	5.8 km	MPC · JPL
780868	2012 YA_{17}	—	December 23, 2012	Haleakala	Pan-STARRS 1	·	1.1 km	MPC · JPL
780869	2012 YL_{17}	—	December 23, 2012	Haleakala	Pan-STARRS 1	·	2.6 km	MPC · JPL
780870	2012 YV_{21}	—	September 17, 2003	Kitt Peak	Spacewatch	·	810 m	MPC · JPL
780871	2012 YC_{22}	—	December 23, 2012	Haleakala	Pan-STARRS 1	L4	5.2 km	MPC · JPL
780872	2012 YH_{22}	—	December 22, 2012	Haleakala	Pan-STARRS 1	EOS	1.4 km	MPC · JPL
780873	2012 YQ_{22}	—	October 13, 2005	Mount Lemmon	Mount Lemmon Survey	·	2.1 km	MPC · JPL
780874	2012 YW_{23}	—	December 22, 2012	Haleakala	Pan-STARRS 1	·	2.1 km	MPC · JPL
780875	2012 YM_{24}	—	December 31, 2007	Mount Lemmon	Mount Lemmon Survey	EOS	1.4 km	MPC · JPL
780876	2012 YJ_{25}	—	December 23, 2012	Haleakala	Pan-STARRS 1	·	1.8 km	MPC · JPL
780877	2012 YS_{25}	—	December 23, 2012	Haleakala	Pan-STARRS 1	L4	5.5 km	MPC · JPL
780878	2012 YW_{25}	—	December 23, 2012	Haleakala	Pan-STARRS 1	·	1.8 km	MPC · JPL
780879	2012 YS_{26}	—	December 23, 2012	Haleakala	Pan-STARRS 1	L4	5.5 km	MPC · JPL
780880	2012 YU_{26}	—	December 23, 2012	Haleakala	Pan-STARRS 1	L4	6.0 km	MPC · JPL
780881	2012 YH_{27}	—	December 22, 2012	Haleakala	Pan-STARRS 1	·	1.7 km	MPC · JPL
780882	2012 YK_{27}	—	December 22, 2012	Haleakala	Pan-STARRS 1	EUN	840 m	MPC · JPL
780883	2012 YL_{27}	—	December 23, 2012	Haleakala	Pan-STARRS 1	·	2.3 km	MPC · JPL
780884	2012 YA_{28}	—	December 23, 2012	Haleakala	Pan-STARRS 1	·	2.0 km	MPC · JPL
780885	2012 YC_{28}	—	December 23, 2012	Haleakala	Pan-STARRS 1	EOS	1.2 km	MPC · JPL
780886	2012 YG_{28}	—	December 23, 2012	Haleakala	Pan-STARRS 1	·	1.9 km	MPC · JPL
780887	2012 YU_{28}	—	December 23, 2012	Haleakala	Pan-STARRS 1	·	2.1 km	MPC · JPL
780888	2013 AQ_{6}	—	December 17, 2012	Nogales	M. Schwartz, P. R. Holvorcem	·	850 m	MPC · JPL
780889	2013 AY_{6}	—	January 3, 2013	Mount Lemmon	Mount Lemmon Survey	LIX	2.7 km	MPC · JPL
780890	2013 AS_{9}	—	December 17, 2012	Nogales	M. Schwartz, P. R. Holvorcem	·	2.4 km	MPC · JPL
780891	2013 AM_{10}	—	January 4, 2013	Kitt Peak	Spacewatch	·	2.8 km	MPC · JPL
780892	2013 AQ_{12}	—	January 3, 2013	Mount Lemmon	Mount Lemmon Survey	·	2.3 km	MPC · JPL
780893	2013 AV_{16}	—	January 4, 2013	Cala d'Hort	B. Linero, I. de la Cueva	EOS	1.5 km	MPC · JPL
780894	2013 AD_{18}	—	January 5, 2013	Mount Lemmon	Mount Lemmon Survey	·	3.2 km	MPC · JPL
780895	2013 AK_{18}	—	January 31, 2009	Kitt Peak	Spacewatch	·	1.0 km	MPC · JPL
780896	2013 AU_{27}	—	January 7, 2013	Catalina	CSS	AMO	600 m	MPC · JPL
780897	2013 AE_{29}	—	January 18, 2009	Kitt Peak	Spacewatch	KON	1.8 km	MPC · JPL
780898	2013 AG_{31}	—	January 3, 2013	Mount Lemmon	Mount Lemmon Survey	·	2.0 km	MPC · JPL
780899	2013 AZ_{34}	—	December 8, 2012	Kitt Peak	Spacewatch	AGN	760 m	MPC · JPL
780900	2013 AO_{47}	—	January 16, 2009	Mount Lemmon	Mount Lemmon Survey	HNS	700 m	MPC · JPL

== 780901–781000 ==
back to top

Designation			Discovery			Properties		Ref
Permanent	Provisional	Named after	Date	Site	Discoverer(s)	Category	Diam.	Ref
780901	2013 AE_{48}	—	January 7, 2013	Mount Lemmon	Mount Lemmon Survey	·	2.2 km	MPC · JPL
780902	2013 AC_{54}	—	June 5, 2005	Kitt Peak	Spacewatch	·	1.3 km	MPC · JPL
780903	2013 AK_{62}	—	December 22, 2012	Haleakala	Pan-STARRS 1	·	820 m	MPC · JPL
780904	2013 AE_{64}	—	December 20, 2004	Mount Lemmon	Mount Lemmon Survey	·	1.0 km	MPC · JPL
780905	2013 AK_{64}	—	December 30, 2008	Kitt Peak	Spacewatch	KON	1.9 km	MPC · JPL
780906	2013 AA_{67}	—	January 6, 2013	Mount Lemmon	Mount Lemmon Survey	·	910 m	MPC · JPL
780907	2013 AN_{74}	—	January 9, 2013	Mount Lemmon	Mount Lemmon Survey	·	2.4 km	MPC · JPL
780908	2013 AX_{86}	—	January 13, 2013	Mount Lemmon	Mount Lemmon Survey	VER	2.0 km	MPC · JPL
780909	2013 AV_{94}	—	January 4, 2013	Kitt Peak	Spacewatch	·	2.1 km	MPC · JPL
780910	2013 AZ_{94}	—	December 7, 2012	Mount Lemmon	Mount Lemmon Survey	T_{j} (2.99) · (895)	2.8 km	MPC · JPL
780911	2013 AU_{97}	—	January 5, 2013	Mount Lemmon	Mount Lemmon Survey	·	1.3 km	MPC · JPL
780912	2013 AY_{110}	—	February 24, 2009	Mount Lemmon	Mount Lemmon Survey	·	990 m	MPC · JPL
780913	2013 AU_{113}	—	January 13, 2013	Mount Lemmon	Mount Lemmon Survey	THM	1.5 km	MPC · JPL
780914	2013 AL_{119}	—	January 2, 2013	Mount Lemmon	Mount Lemmon Survey	·	960 m	MPC · JPL
780915	2013 AS_{123}	—	April 17, 2009	Mount Lemmon	Mount Lemmon Survey	·	1.1 km	MPC · JPL
780916	2013 AE_{127}	—	January 3, 2013	Haleakala	Pan-STARRS 1	(5)	770 m	MPC · JPL
780917	2013 AK_{129}	—	January 10, 2013	Haleakala	Pan-STARRS 1	·	1.0 km	MPC · JPL
780918	2013 AO_{130}	—	May 25, 2006	Mauna Kea	P. A. Wiegert	(5)	1.0 km	MPC · JPL
780919	2013 AD_{135}	—	January 9, 2013	Kitt Peak	Spacewatch	·	1.8 km	MPC · JPL
780920	2013 AE_{135}	—	January 9, 2013	Kitt Peak	Spacewatch	·	600 m	MPC · JPL
780921	2013 AJ_{135}	—	January 10, 2013	Haleakala	Pan-STARRS 1	L4	5.4 km	MPC · JPL
780922	2013 AU_{135}	—	January 10, 2013	Haleakala	Pan-STARRS 1	L4	5.4 km	MPC · JPL
780923	2013 AX_{136}	—	January 10, 2013	Haleakala	Pan-STARRS 1	L4	5.6 km	MPC · JPL
780924	2013 AH_{141}	—	October 23, 2011	Kitt Peak	Spacewatch	·	2.1 km	MPC · JPL
780925	2013 AX_{141}	—	January 4, 2013	Cerro Tololo	D. E. Trilling, R. L. Allen	·	870 m	MPC · JPL
780926	2013 AR_{143}	—	January 4, 2013	Cerro Tololo	D. E. Trilling, R. L. Allen	·	1.5 km	MPC · JPL
780927	2013 AW_{144}	—	October 13, 2010	Mount Lemmon	Mount Lemmon Survey	L4	6.2 km	MPC · JPL
780928	2013 AR_{145}	—	January 4, 2013	Cerro Tololo	D. E. Trilling, R. L. Allen	·	940 m	MPC · JPL
780929	2013 AA_{147}	—	January 4, 2013	Cerro Tololo	D. E. Trilling, R. L. Allen	·	2.3 km	MPC · JPL
780930	2013 AO_{149}	—	October 20, 2011	Mount Lemmon	Mount Lemmon Survey	·	1.8 km	MPC · JPL
780931	2013 AW_{149}	—	January 4, 2013	Cerro Tololo	D. E. Trilling, R. L. Allen	·	2.5 km	MPC · JPL
780932	2013 AU_{150}	—	November 18, 2006	Mount Lemmon	Mount Lemmon Survey	·	1.6 km	MPC · JPL
780933	2013 AX_{150}	—	January 4, 2013	Cerro Tololo	D. E. Trilling, R. L. Allen	·	1.8 km	MPC · JPL
780934	2013 AN_{151}	—	January 31, 2009	Kitt Peak	Spacewatch	MAR	670 m	MPC · JPL
780935	2013 AJ_{155}	—	January 20, 2009	Kitt Peak	Spacewatch	EUN	680 m	MPC · JPL
780936	2013 AS_{155}	—	January 4, 2013	Cerro Tololo	D. E. Trilling, R. L. Allen	EOS	1.2 km	MPC · JPL
780937	2013 AR_{157}	—	January 4, 2013	Cerro Tololo	D. E. Trilling, R. L. Allen	·	1.8 km	MPC · JPL
780938	2013 AZ_{158}	—	January 4, 2013	Cerro Tololo	D. E. Trilling, R. L. Allen	·	1.9 km	MPC · JPL
780939	2013 AN_{159}	—	October 22, 2011	Bergisch Gladbach	W. Bickel	·	1.8 km	MPC · JPL
780940	2013 AU_{160}	—	January 4, 2013	Cerro Tololo	D. E. Trilling, R. L. Allen	L4	6.2 km	MPC · JPL
780941	2013 AJ_{161}	—	January 20, 2013	Mount Lemmon	Mount Lemmon Survey	·	1.2 km	MPC · JPL
780942	2013 AL_{164}	—	January 4, 2013	Cerro Tololo	D. E. Trilling, R. L. Allen	MAR	640 m	MPC · JPL
780943	2013 AE_{165}	—	October 19, 2003	Kitt Peak	Spacewatch	·	880 m	MPC · JPL
780944	2013 AK_{167}	—	January 4, 2013	Cerro Tololo	D. E. Trilling, R. L. Allen	·	2.0 km	MPC · JPL
780945	2013 AA_{169}	—	January 20, 2013	Mount Lemmon	Mount Lemmon Survey	·	1.6 km	MPC · JPL
780946	2013 AT_{170}	—	January 4, 2013	Cerro Tololo	D. E. Trilling, R. L. Allen	·	890 m	MPC · JPL
780947	2013 AG_{171}	—	January 4, 2013	Cerro Tololo	D. E. Trilling, R. L. Allen	L4	6.2 km	MPC · JPL
780948	2013 AC_{172}	—	January 4, 2013	Cerro Tololo	D. E. Trilling, R. L. Allen	L4	5.4 km	MPC · JPL
780949	2013 AD_{179}	—	January 5, 2013	Cerro Tololo	D. E. Trilling, R. L. Allen	·	2.5 km	MPC · JPL
780950	2013 AU_{179}	—	April 2, 2009	Kitt Peak	Spacewatch	·	1.1 km	MPC · JPL
780951	2013 AE_{182}	—	January 5, 2013	Cerro Tololo	D. E. Trilling, R. L. Allen	EUN	840 m	MPC · JPL
780952	2013 AA_{184}	—	October 13, 2010	Mount Lemmon	Mount Lemmon Survey	L4 · ERY	5.3 km	MPC · JPL
780953	2013 AR_{184}	—	January 6, 2013	Kitt Peak	Spacewatch	·	1.5 km	MPC · JPL
780954	2013 AV_{184}	—	January 10, 2013	Haleakala	Pan-STARRS 1	·	1.2 km	MPC · JPL
780955	2013 AE_{187}	—	January 10, 2013	Haleakala	Pan-STARRS 1	·	2.1 km	MPC · JPL
780956	2013 AC_{188}	—	January 10, 2013	Haleakala	Pan-STARRS 1	MAR	630 m	MPC · JPL
780957	2013 AV_{189}	—	January 10, 2013	Haleakala	Pan-STARRS 1	·	1.9 km	MPC · JPL
780958	2013 AW_{189}	—	January 10, 2013	Haleakala	Pan-STARRS 1	·	2.3 km	MPC · JPL
780959	2013 AE_{190}	—	June 8, 2016	Haleakala	Pan-STARRS 1	·	2.1 km	MPC · JPL
780960	2013 AK_{190}	—	June 7, 2016	Haleakala	Pan-STARRS 1	·	1.8 km	MPC · JPL
780961	2013 AU_{190}	—	January 10, 2013	Haleakala	Pan-STARRS 1	·	2.5 km	MPC · JPL
780962	2013 AE_{191}	—	January 6, 2013	Kitt Peak	Spacewatch	·	1.6 km	MPC · JPL
780963	2013 AP_{191}	—	January 10, 2013	Haleakala	Pan-STARRS 1	·	800 m	MPC · JPL
780964	2013 AM_{192}	—	January 10, 2013	Haleakala	Pan-STARRS 1	L4	6.2 km	MPC · JPL
780965	2013 AE_{194}	—	January 10, 2013	Haleakala	Pan-STARRS 1	EUN	960 m	MPC · JPL
780966	2013 AG_{194}	—	January 10, 2013	Haleakala	Pan-STARRS 1	·	2.2 km	MPC · JPL
780967	2013 AC_{196}	—	January 10, 2013	Haleakala	Pan-STARRS 1	L4	5.5 km	MPC · JPL
780968	2013 AM_{196}	—	January 10, 2013	Haleakala	Pan-STARRS 1	·	1.9 km	MPC · JPL
780969	2013 AH_{197}	—	January 10, 2013	Haleakala	Pan-STARRS 1	L4	5.6 km	MPC · JPL
780970	2013 AJ_{197}	—	January 9, 2013	Kitt Peak	Spacewatch	·	2.1 km	MPC · JPL
780971	2013 AK_{198}	—	January 5, 2013	Kitt Peak	Spacewatch	AEO	780 m	MPC · JPL
780972	2013 AL_{198}	—	January 13, 2013	Mount Lemmon	Mount Lemmon Survey	·	890 m	MPC · JPL
780973	2013 AL_{199}	—	January 15, 2013	ESA OGS	ESA OGS	·	2.3 km	MPC · JPL
780974	2013 AW_{199}	—	January 10, 2013	Mount Lemmon	Mount Lemmon Survey	T_{j} (2.98)	2.4 km	MPC · JPL
780975	2013 AN_{200}	—	January 6, 2013	Mount Lemmon	Mount Lemmon Survey	·	830 m	MPC · JPL
780976	2013 AW_{202}	—	January 10, 2013	Haleakala	Pan-STARRS 1	L4	5.4 km	MPC · JPL
780977	2013 AC_{203}	—	January 10, 2013	Haleakala	Pan-STARRS 1	L4	5.8 km	MPC · JPL
780978	2013 AG_{203}	—	January 6, 2013	Kitt Peak	Spacewatch	VER	2.2 km	MPC · JPL
780979	2013 AW_{204}	—	January 10, 2013	Haleakala	Pan-STARRS 1	L4	5.8 km	MPC · JPL
780980	2013 AL_{205}	—	January 10, 2013	Haleakala	Pan-STARRS 1	L4	6.1 km	MPC · JPL
780981	2013 AP_{205}	—	January 10, 2013	Haleakala	Pan-STARRS 1	·	1.4 km	MPC · JPL
780982	2013 AA_{206}	—	January 6, 2013	Kitt Peak	Spacewatch	·	2.3 km	MPC · JPL
780983	2013 AJ_{207}	—	January 10, 2013	Haleakala	Pan-STARRS 1	·	1.1 km	MPC · JPL
780984	2013 AC_{208}	—	January 5, 2013	Mount Lemmon	Mount Lemmon Survey	·	1.2 km	MPC · JPL
780985	2013 AK_{208}	—	January 14, 2013	Mount Lemmon	Mount Lemmon Survey	L4	5.7 km	MPC · JPL
780986	2013 AB_{209}	—	January 10, 2013	Haleakala	Pan-STARRS 1	·	1.9 km	MPC · JPL
780987	2013 AF_{209}	—	January 2, 2013	Mount Lemmon	Mount Lemmon Survey	·	2.7 km	MPC · JPL
780988	2013 AG_{209}	—	January 10, 2013	Haleakala	Pan-STARRS 1	·	2.0 km	MPC · JPL
780989	2013 AK_{210}	—	January 6, 2013	Kitt Peak	Spacewatch	L4	4.9 km	MPC · JPL
780990	2013 AV_{210}	—	January 10, 2013	Haleakala	Pan-STARRS 1	L4	5.7 km	MPC · JPL
780991	2013 AY_{210}	—	March 3, 2009	Kitt Peak	Spacewatch	·	1.1 km	MPC · JPL
780992	2013 AV_{222}	—	January 3, 2013	Mount Lemmon	Mount Lemmon Survey	·	1.0 km	MPC · JPL
780993	2013 BN_{1}	—	December 23, 2012	Haleakala	Pan-STARRS 1	L4	4.4 km	MPC · JPL
780994	2013 BY_{3}	—	September 19, 2011	Haleakala	Pan-STARRS 1	EOS	1.3 km	MPC · JPL
780995	2013 BM_{7}	—	February 9, 2005	Mount Lemmon	Mount Lemmon Survey	·	1.0 km	MPC · JPL
780996	2013 BQ_{12}	—	December 23, 2012	Haleakala	Pan-STARRS 1	EOS	1.5 km	MPC · JPL
780997	2013 BN_{16}	—	January 17, 2013	Haleakala	Pan-STARRS 1	L4 · ERY	5.5 km	MPC · JPL
780998	2013 BU_{18}	—	January 16, 2013	Haleakala	Pan-STARRS 1	L4	5.4 km	MPC · JPL
780999	2013 BO_{20}	—	January 16, 2013	Mount Lemmon	Mount Lemmon Survey	·	2.0 km	MPC · JPL
781000	2013 BJ_{24}	—	January 17, 2013	Haleakala	Pan-STARRS 1	EOS	1.4 km	MPC · JPL

back to top

== Meaning of names ==
As minor planet discoveries are confirmed, they are given a permanent number by the IAU's Minor Planet Center (MPC), and the discoverers can then submit names for them, following the IAU's naming conventions. The list below concerns those minor planets in the specified number-range that have received names, and explains the meanings of those names.

Official naming citations of newly named small Solar System bodies are approved and published in a bulletin by IAU's Working Group for Small Bodies Nomenclature (WGSBN). Before May 2021, citations were published in MPC's Minor Planet Circulars for many decades. Recent citations can also be found on the JPL Small-Body Database (SBDB). Until his death in 2016, German astronomer Lutz D. Schmadel compiled these citations into the Dictionary of Minor Planet Names (DMP) and regularly updated the collection.

Based on Paul Herget's The Names of the Minor Planets, Schmadel also researched the unclear origin of numerous asteroids, most of which had been named prior to World War II. This article incorporates text from this source, which is in the public domain: SBDB New namings may only be added to this list below after official publication as the preannouncement of names is condemned. The WGSBN publishes a comprehensive guideline for the naming rules of non-cometary small Solar System bodies.

Named minor planet	Provisional	This minor planet was named for...	Ref · Catalog
780137 Gatterer	2012 HK_{91}	Alois Gatterer, S.J. (1886–1953), Austrian Jesuit astronomer.	IAU · 780137
780857 Rodés	2012 XA_{180}	Luis Rodés Campdera, Spanish Jesuit astronomer and a pioneer of solar research in Spain who led the Ebro Observatory.	IAU · 780857
