= List of minor planets: 573001–574000 =

The following is a partial list of minor planets, running from minor-planet number 573001 through 574000, inclusive. The primary data for this and other partial lists is based on JPL's "Small-Body Orbital Elements" and data available from the Minor Planet Center. Critical list information is also provided by the MPC, unless otherwise specified from Lowell Observatory. A detailed description of the table's columns and additional sources are given on the main page including a complete list of every page in this series, and a statistical break-up on the dynamical classification of minor planets.

Also see the summary list of all named bodies in numerical and alphabetical order, and the corresponding naming citations for the number range of this particular list. New namings may only be added to this list after official publication, as the preannouncement of names is condemned by the Working Group for Small Bodies Nomenclature of the International Astronomical Union.

Near-Earth obj.	MBA (inner)	MBA (outer)	Centaur
Mars-crosser	MBA (middle)	Jupiter trojan	Trans-Neptunian obj.
Unclassified

== 573001–573100 ==
Designation			Discovery			Properties		Ref
Permanent	Provisional	Named after	Date	Site	Discoverer(s)	Category	Diam.	Ref
573001	2008 VH_{37}	—	November 2, 2008	Mount Lemmon	Mount Lemmon Survey	AGN	980 m	MPC · JPL
573002	2008 VR_{37}	—	October 6, 2008	Mount Lemmon	Mount Lemmon Survey	·	2.4 km	MPC · JPL
573003	2008 VQ_{38}	—	March 4, 2005	Mount Lemmon	Mount Lemmon Survey	AGN	1.0 km	MPC · JPL
573004	2008 VO_{44}	—	November 3, 2008	Mount Lemmon	Mount Lemmon Survey	H	320 m	MPC · JPL
573005	2008 VQ_{44}	—	October 24, 2003	Apache Point	SDSS	·	1.9 km	MPC · JPL
573006	2008 VT_{44}	—	November 3, 2008	Mount Lemmon	Mount Lemmon Survey	·	1.5 km	MPC · JPL
573007	2008 VG_{55}	—	March 3, 2006	Kitt Peak	Spacewatch	·	1.9 km	MPC · JPL
573008	2008 VS_{55}	—	November 12, 1999	Kitt Peak	Spacewatch	·	1.3 km	MPC · JPL
573009	2008 VA_{63}	—	October 27, 2008	Kitt Peak	Spacewatch	·	1.6 km	MPC · JPL
573010	2008 VO_{67}	—	November 8, 2008	Mount Lemmon	Mount Lemmon Survey	·	1.8 km	MPC · JPL
573011	2008 VQ_{70}	—	November 7, 2008	Mount Lemmon	Mount Lemmon Survey	·	1.1 km	MPC · JPL
573012	2008 VN_{74}	—	November 9, 2008	Kitt Peak	Spacewatch	·	1.7 km	MPC · JPL
573013	2008 VY_{82}	—	November 9, 2008	Mount Lemmon	Mount Lemmon Survey	·	2.1 km	MPC · JPL
573014	2008 VB_{83}	—	November 1, 2008	Mount Lemmon	Mount Lemmon Survey	·	2.1 km	MPC · JPL
573015	2008 VD_{83}	—	November 3, 2008	Mount Lemmon	Mount Lemmon Survey	·	1.9 km	MPC · JPL
573016	2008 VK_{83}	—	November 9, 2008	Mount Lemmon	Mount Lemmon Survey	·	2.0 km	MPC · JPL
573017	2008 VO_{83}	—	August 8, 2012	Haleakala	Pan-STARRS 1	·	1.8 km	MPC · JPL
573018	2008 VC_{84}	—	October 4, 2008	Mount Lemmon	Mount Lemmon Survey	·	2.0 km	MPC · JPL
573019	2008 VD_{84}	—	November 28, 2013	Mount Lemmon	Mount Lemmon Survey	·	1.7 km	MPC · JPL
573020	2008 VF_{84}	—	June 11, 2015	Haleakala	Pan-STARRS 1	·	1.2 km	MPC · JPL
573021	2008 VH_{84}	—	August 2, 2011	Haleakala	Pan-STARRS 1	·	690 m	MPC · JPL
573022	2008 VM_{84}	—	November 7, 2008	Mount Lemmon	Mount Lemmon Survey	HOF	2.6 km	MPC · JPL
573023	2008 VA_{85}	—	November 9, 2008	Mount Lemmon	Mount Lemmon Survey	·	2.0 km	MPC · JPL
573024	2008 VC_{85}	—	January 23, 2015	Haleakala	Pan-STARRS 1	·	1.7 km	MPC · JPL
573025	2008 VE_{85}	—	August 14, 2012	Haleakala	Pan-STARRS 1	AGN	1 km	MPC · JPL
573026	2008 VK_{85}	—	November 2, 2008	Mount Lemmon	Mount Lemmon Survey	·	1.5 km	MPC · JPL
573027	2008 VT_{87}	—	November 9, 2008	Kitt Peak	Spacewatch	V	410 m	MPC · JPL
573028	2008 VF_{88}	—	September 26, 2013	Mount Lemmon	Mount Lemmon Survey	H	390 m	MPC · JPL
573029	2008 VF_{89}	—	September 9, 2013	Haleakala	Pan-STARRS 1	·	2.8 km	MPC · JPL
573030	2008 VO_{89}	—	December 11, 2013	Haleakala	Pan-STARRS 1	·	1.6 km	MPC · JPL
573031	2008 VU_{89}	—	November 28, 2013	Haleakala	Pan-STARRS 1	·	2.6 km	MPC · JPL
573032	2008 VC_{90}	—	November 9, 2008	Kitt Peak	Spacewatch	·	1.6 km	MPC · JPL
573033	2008 VF_{90}	—	November 1, 2008	Mount Lemmon	Mount Lemmon Survey	HOF	2.2 km	MPC · JPL
573034	2008 VT_{90}	—	November 8, 2008	Kitt Peak	Spacewatch	·	1.6 km	MPC · JPL
573035	2008 VU_{93}	—	October 1, 2008	Kitt Peak	Spacewatch	·	1.4 km	MPC · JPL
573036	2008 VX_{96}	—	November 7, 2008	Mount Lemmon	Mount Lemmon Survey	·	1.3 km	MPC · JPL
573037	2008 VS_{98}	—	November 7, 2008	Mount Lemmon	Mount Lemmon Survey	·	1.8 km	MPC · JPL
573038	2008 VX_{98}	—	September 18, 2003	Kitt Peak	Spacewatch	·	1.3 km	MPC · JPL
573039	2008 VP_{99}	—	November 2, 2008	Mount Lemmon	Mount Lemmon Survey	(1338) (FLO)	420 m	MPC · JPL
573040	2008 VW_{99}	—	November 6, 2008	Mount Lemmon	Mount Lemmon Survey	·	1.6 km	MPC · JPL
573041	2008 VT_{100}	—	November 3, 2008	Mount Lemmon	Mount Lemmon Survey	·	1.1 km	MPC · JPL
573042	2008 VG_{101}	—	November 7, 2008	Mount Lemmon	Mount Lemmon Survey	·	2.0 km	MPC · JPL
573043	2008 VV_{101}	—	November 2, 2008	Kitt Peak	Spacewatch	·	1.5 km	MPC · JPL
573044	2008 WF	—	September 22, 2008	Catalina	CSS	EUN	1.2 km	MPC · JPL
573045	2008 WO_{1}	—	November 18, 2008	Socorro	LINEAR	H	540 m	MPC · JPL
573046	2008 WF_{7}	—	September 28, 2008	Mount Lemmon	Mount Lemmon Survey	·	1.5 km	MPC · JPL
573047	2008 WX_{7}	—	October 28, 2008	Kitt Peak	Spacewatch	·	840 m	MPC · JPL
573048	2008 WA_{9}	—	September 9, 2008	Mount Lemmon	Mount Lemmon Survey	·	680 m	MPC · JPL
573049	2008 WV_{11}	—	September 18, 2003	Kitt Peak	Spacewatch	·	2.1 km	MPC · JPL
573050	2008 WB_{16}	—	October 9, 2008	Kitt Peak	Spacewatch	·	1.6 km	MPC · JPL
573051	2008 WO_{19}	—	September 28, 2003	Kitt Peak	Spacewatch	AGN	1.1 km	MPC · JPL
573052	2008 WZ_{20}	—	November 17, 2008	Kitt Peak	Spacewatch	·	1.6 km	MPC · JPL
573053	2008 WB_{29}	—	October 27, 2008	Mount Lemmon	Mount Lemmon Survey	·	1.6 km	MPC · JPL
573054	2008 WN_{35}	—	October 20, 2003	Kitt Peak	Spacewatch	KOR	1.4 km	MPC · JPL
573055	2008 WQ_{37}	—	November 17, 2008	Kitt Peak	Spacewatch	AST	1.6 km	MPC · JPL
573056	2008 WQ_{38}	—	November 17, 2008	Kitt Peak	Spacewatch	NYS	740 m	MPC · JPL
573057	2008 WS_{43}	—	October 22, 2003	Kitt Peak	Spacewatch	AGN	1.5 km	MPC · JPL
573058	2008 WJ_{44}	—	November 17, 2008	Kitt Peak	Spacewatch	·	1.6 km	MPC · JPL
573059	2008 WU_{44}	—	May 24, 2006	Kitt Peak	Spacewatch	·	1.5 km	MPC · JPL
573060	2008 WL_{52}	—	October 27, 2008	Kitt Peak	Spacewatch	·	1.4 km	MPC · JPL
573061	2008 WC_{54}	—	November 19, 2008	Kitt Peak	Spacewatch	KOR	1.1 km	MPC · JPL
573062	2008 WP_{58}	—	October 23, 2008	Kitt Peak	Spacewatch	·	830 m	MPC · JPL
573063	2008 WP_{67}	—	May 6, 2006	Mount Lemmon	Mount Lemmon Survey	·	1.8 km	MPC · JPL
573064	2008 WW_{69}	—	December 7, 2001	Kitt Peak	Spacewatch	·	630 m	MPC · JPL
573065	2008 WU_{71}	—	October 28, 2008	Kitt Peak	Spacewatch	·	1.4 km	MPC · JPL
573066	2008 WM_{72}	—	November 19, 2008	Mount Lemmon	Mount Lemmon Survey	·	1.4 km	MPC · JPL
573067	2008 WO_{74}	—	September 29, 2003	Kitt Peak	Spacewatch	AGN	1.2 km	MPC · JPL
573068	2008 WY_{75}	—	November 20, 2008	Kitt Peak	Spacewatch	KOR	1.0 km	MPC · JPL
573069	2008 WE_{77}	—	November 7, 2008	Mount Lemmon	Mount Lemmon Survey	·	1.8 km	MPC · JPL
573070	2008 WW_{80}	—	November 7, 2008	Mount Lemmon	Mount Lemmon Survey	·	610 m	MPC · JPL
573071	2008 WO_{84}	—	November 20, 2008	Kitt Peak	Spacewatch	·	770 m	MPC · JPL
573072	2008 WF_{86}	—	October 23, 2008	Kitt Peak	Spacewatch	GEF	1.2 km	MPC · JPL
573073	2008 WV_{87}	—	November 21, 2008	Mount Lemmon	Mount Lemmon Survey	·	1.5 km	MPC · JPL
573074	2008 WM_{93}	—	November 21, 2008	Mount Lemmon	Mount Lemmon Survey	BRA	1.3 km	MPC · JPL
573075	2008 WF_{95}	—	November 21, 2008	Cerro Burek	Burek, Cerro	·	2.2 km	MPC · JPL
573076	2008 WC_{98}	—	September 19, 2003	Kitt Peak	Spacewatch	·	1.5 km	MPC · JPL
573077	2008 WJ_{98}	—	October 25, 2008	Catalina	CSS	JUN	1.0 km	MPC · JPL
573078	2008 WY_{101}	—	November 20, 2008	Kitt Peak	Spacewatch	·	340 m	MPC · JPL
573079	2008 WZ_{103}	—	November 30, 2008	Catalina	CSS	·	1.8 km	MPC · JPL
573080	2008 WE_{105}	—	November 18, 2008	Kitt Peak	Spacewatch	·	870 m	MPC · JPL
573081	2008 WX_{110}	—	November 17, 2008	Kitt Peak	Spacewatch	·	1.7 km	MPC · JPL
573082	2008 WK_{117}	—	September 5, 2008	Kitt Peak	Spacewatch	·	2.2 km	MPC · JPL
573083	2008 WH_{119}	—	November 30, 2008	Mount Lemmon	Mount Lemmon Survey	KOR	1.2 km	MPC · JPL
573084	2008 WT_{134}	—	November 24, 2008	Mount Lemmon	Mount Lemmon Survey	PHO	880 m	MPC · JPL
573085	2008 WH_{144}	—	November 18, 2008	Kitt Peak	Spacewatch	KOR	1.3 km	MPC · JPL
573086	2008 WJ_{144}	—	September 24, 2011	Catalina	CSS	·	820 m	MPC · JPL
573087	2008 WP_{144}	—	November 30, 2008	Mount Lemmon	Mount Lemmon Survey	·	1.4 km	MPC · JPL
573088	2008 WR_{144}	—	November 24, 2008	Mount Lemmon	Mount Lemmon Survey	MRX	1.0 km	MPC · JPL
573089	2008 WS_{144}	—	November 20, 2008	Mount Lemmon	Mount Lemmon Survey	·	560 m	MPC · JPL
573090	2008 WU_{144}	—	November 19, 2008	Kitt Peak	Spacewatch	·	1.2 km	MPC · JPL
573091	2008 WF_{145}	—	September 19, 2011	Haleakala	Pan-STARRS 1	·	620 m	MPC · JPL
573092	2008 WL_{145}	—	November 21, 2008	Kitt Peak	Spacewatch	PHO	1.1 km	MPC · JPL
573093	2008 WO_{145}	—	November 19, 2008	Mount Lemmon	Mount Lemmon Survey	·	1.0 km	MPC · JPL
573094	2008 WK_{149}	—	June 29, 2011	Kitt Peak	Spacewatch	·	2.2 km	MPC · JPL
573095	2008 WT_{150}	—	August 14, 2012	Haleakala	Pan-STARRS 1	·	1.6 km	MPC · JPL
573096	2008 WR_{151}	—	October 31, 2013	Kitt Peak	Spacewatch	·	1.6 km	MPC · JPL
573097	2008 WC_{152}	—	November 19, 2008	Kitt Peak	Spacewatch	·	1.7 km	MPC · JPL
573098	2008 WR_{152}	—	July 4, 2016	Kitt Peak	Spacewatch	·	1.5 km	MPC · JPL
573099	2008 WH_{153}	—	March 21, 2015	Haleakala	Pan-STARRS 1	·	1.5 km	MPC · JPL
573100	2008 WU_{156}	—	November 19, 2008	Kitt Peak	Spacewatch	·	580 m	MPC · JPL

== 573101–573200 ==
back to top

Designation			Discovery			Properties		Ref
Permanent	Provisional	Named after	Date	Site	Discoverer(s)	Category	Diam.	Ref
573101	2008 WV_{156}	—	November 19, 2008	Kitt Peak	Spacewatch	HOF	2.2 km	MPC · JPL
573102	2008 WZ_{157}	—	November 30, 2008	Mount Lemmon	Mount Lemmon Survey	V	540 m	MPC · JPL
573103	2008 XU_{8}	—	December 1, 2008	Mount Lemmon	Mount Lemmon Survey	·	590 m	MPC · JPL
573104	2008 XH_{9}	—	December 1, 2008	Mount Lemmon	Mount Lemmon Survey	·	1.7 km	MPC · JPL
573105	2008 XY_{11}	—	November 19, 2008	Kitt Peak	Spacewatch	·	2.1 km	MPC · JPL
573106	2008 XV_{12}	—	November 3, 2008	Mount Lemmon	Mount Lemmon Survey	·	2.3 km	MPC · JPL
573107	2008 XF_{14}	—	November 18, 2008	Kitt Peak	Spacewatch	·	1.7 km	MPC · JPL
573108	2008 XF_{18}	—	December 9, 2004	Catalina	CSS	·	2.2 km	MPC · JPL
573109	2008 XC_{19}	—	January 23, 2006	Kitt Peak	Spacewatch	·	710 m	MPC · JPL
573110	2008 XD_{19}	—	December 1, 2008	Kitt Peak	Spacewatch	·	3.1 km	MPC · JPL
573111	2008 XU_{22}	—	November 24, 2008	Kitt Peak	Spacewatch	AGN	1.1 km	MPC · JPL
573112	2008 XK_{23}	—	August 22, 2001	Haleakala	NEAT	·	670 m	MPC · JPL
573113	2008 XO_{23}	—	December 4, 2008	Mount Lemmon	Mount Lemmon Survey	·	690 m	MPC · JPL
573114	2008 XL_{25}	—	December 4, 2008	Mount Lemmon	Mount Lemmon Survey	DOR	2.6 km	MPC · JPL
573115	2008 XF_{27}	—	October 29, 2008	Kitt Peak	Spacewatch	·	880 m	MPC · JPL
573116	2008 XG_{27}	—	December 4, 2008	Mount Lemmon	Mount Lemmon Survey	·	610 m	MPC · JPL
573117	2008 XN_{27}	—	December 4, 2008	Mount Lemmon	Mount Lemmon Survey	·	2.3 km	MPC · JPL
573118	2008 XD_{30}	—	October 25, 2001	Apache Point	SDSS Collaboration	·	720 m	MPC · JPL
573119	2008 XJ_{30}	—	December 1, 2008	Kitt Peak	Spacewatch	·	1.6 km	MPC · JPL
573120	2008 XF_{32}	—	December 2, 2008	Kitt Peak	Spacewatch	·	1.8 km	MPC · JPL
573121	2008 XG_{32}	—	October 27, 2008	Kitt Peak	Spacewatch	·	580 m	MPC · JPL
573122	2008 XG_{38}	—	September 21, 2003	Palomar	NEAT	·	1.8 km	MPC · JPL
573123	2008 XR_{41}	—	September 26, 2000	Kitt Peak	Spacewatch	·	2.8 km	MPC · JPL
573124	2008 XJ_{44}	—	December 3, 2008	Kitt Peak	Spacewatch	HOF	2.2 km	MPC · JPL
573125	2008 XN_{49}	—	December 7, 2008	Mount Lemmon	Mount Lemmon Survey	·	2.2 km	MPC · JPL
573126	2008 XV_{51}	—	December 6, 2008	Kitt Peak	Spacewatch	·	2.2 km	MPC · JPL
573127	2008 XT_{52}	—	December 2, 2008	Mount Lemmon	Mount Lemmon Survey	PHO	1.0 km	MPC · JPL
573128	2008 XG_{57}	—	May 12, 2005	Mount Lemmon	Mount Lemmon Survey	·	3.0 km	MPC · JPL
573129	2008 XK_{57}	—	December 5, 2008	Mount Lemmon	Mount Lemmon Survey	·	1.1 km	MPC · JPL
573130	2008 XW_{58}	—	September 17, 2017	Haleakala	Pan-STARRS 1	·	1.6 km	MPC · JPL
573131	2008 XQ_{59}	—	December 4, 2012	Mount Lemmon	Mount Lemmon Survey	·	1.4 km	MPC · JPL
573132	2008 XV_{59}	—	December 1, 2008	Mount Lemmon	Mount Lemmon Survey	·	930 m	MPC · JPL
573133	2008 XX_{59}	—	December 2, 2008	Kitt Peak	Spacewatch	·	1.4 km	MPC · JPL
573134	2008 XA_{60}	—	November 22, 2008	Kitt Peak	Spacewatch	MRX	1.1 km	MPC · JPL
573135	2008 XR_{60}	—	December 4, 2008	Kitt Peak	Spacewatch	·	640 m	MPC · JPL
573136	2008 XT_{62}	—	December 5, 2008	Kitt Peak	Spacewatch	AGN	950 m	MPC · JPL
573137	2008 XW_{63}	—	December 3, 2008	Kitt Peak	Spacewatch	·	1.5 km	MPC · JPL
573138	2008 YV_{1}	—	December 19, 2008	Socorro	LINEAR	T_{j} (2.89)	2.8 km	MPC · JPL
573139	2008 YL_{6}	—	October 3, 2003	Kitt Peak	Spacewatch	·	1.6 km	MPC · JPL
573140	2008 YT_{6}	—	December 22, 2008	Dauban	C. Rinner, Kugel, F.	EOS	1.5 km	MPC · JPL
573141	2008 YZ_{9}	—	December 19, 2008	Lulin	LUSS	·	2.4 km	MPC · JPL
573142	2008 YK_{11}	—	December 20, 2008	Lulin	LUSS	H	680 m	MPC · JPL
573143	2008 YN_{20}	—	July 16, 2004	Cerro Tololo	Deep Ecliptic Survey	·	490 m	MPC · JPL
573144	2008 YD_{24}	—	December 22, 2008	Catalina	CSS	·	2.1 km	MPC · JPL
573145	2008 YZ_{27}	—	December 28, 2008	Wildberg	R. Apitzsch	·	1.4 km	MPC · JPL
573146	2008 YY_{28}	—	December 28, 2008	Piszkéstető	K. Sárneczky	·	750 m	MPC · JPL
573147	2008 YL_{30}	—	December 29, 2008	Piszkéstető	K. Sárneczky	·	1.8 km	MPC · JPL
573148	2008 YP_{30}	—	September 12, 2007	Mount Lemmon	Mount Lemmon Survey	·	2.9 km	MPC · JPL
573149	2008 YL_{31}	—	December 28, 2008	Nazaret	Muler, G.	·	1.3 km	MPC · JPL
573150	2008 YA_{32}	—	December 30, 2008	Altschwendt	W. Ries	ADE	1.7 km	MPC · JPL
573151	2008 YU_{34}	—	December 31, 2008	Catalina	CSS	H	500 m	MPC · JPL
573152	2008 YO_{36}	—	December 22, 2008	Kitt Peak	Spacewatch	EOS	1.9 km	MPC · JPL
573153	2008 YW_{37}	—	December 23, 2008	Calar Alto	F. Hormuth	KOR	1.1 km	MPC · JPL
573154	2008 YV_{44}	—	December 29, 2008	Mount Lemmon	Mount Lemmon Survey	V	770 m	MPC · JPL
573155	2008 YV_{45}	—	December 29, 2008	Mount Lemmon	Mount Lemmon Survey	·	430 m	MPC · JPL
573156	2008 YA_{46}	—	December 29, 2008	Mount Lemmon	Mount Lemmon Survey	·	1.5 km	MPC · JPL
573157	2008 YT_{46}	—	December 29, 2008	Mount Lemmon	Mount Lemmon Survey	·	1.9 km	MPC · JPL
573158	2008 YL_{51}	—	December 22, 2008	Kitt Peak	Spacewatch	·	1.5 km	MPC · JPL
573159	2008 YU_{53}	—	December 29, 2008	Mount Lemmon	Mount Lemmon Survey	·	1.6 km	MPC · JPL
573160	2008 YY_{56}	—	December 30, 2008	Kitt Peak	Spacewatch	·	750 m	MPC · JPL
573161	2008 YF_{57}	—	December 30, 2008	Kitt Peak	Spacewatch	·	500 m	MPC · JPL
573162	2008 YK_{60}	—	December 30, 2008	Mount Lemmon	Mount Lemmon Survey	·	2.0 km	MPC · JPL
573163	2008 YR_{60}	—	December 30, 2008	Mount Lemmon	Mount Lemmon Survey	·	1.8 km	MPC · JPL
573164	2008 YE_{61}	—	December 2, 2008	Mount Lemmon	Mount Lemmon Survey	·	1.8 km	MPC · JPL
573165	2008 YH_{62}	—	November 24, 2008	Mount Lemmon	Mount Lemmon Survey	·	1.4 km	MPC · JPL
573166	2008 YT_{62}	—	December 30, 2008	Mount Lemmon	Mount Lemmon Survey	·	1.4 km	MPC · JPL
573167	2008 YF_{66}	—	November 21, 2008	Mount Lemmon	Mount Lemmon Survey	·	1.8 km	MPC · JPL
573168	2008 YY_{67}	—	February 13, 2002	Kitt Peak	Spacewatch	·	990 m	MPC · JPL
573169	2008 YV_{69}	—	December 29, 2008	Mount Lemmon	Mount Lemmon Survey	NYS	960 m	MPC · JPL
573170	2008 YN_{70}	—	December 29, 2008	Mount Lemmon	Mount Lemmon Survey	H	480 m	MPC · JPL
573171	2008 YO_{71}	—	December 30, 2008	Kitt Peak	Spacewatch	·	1.5 km	MPC · JPL
573172	2008 YL_{73}	—	December 30, 2008	Kitt Peak	Spacewatch	·	1.5 km	MPC · JPL
573173	2008 YS_{74}	—	December 30, 2008	Kitt Peak	Spacewatch	·	890 m	MPC · JPL
573174	2008 YK_{75}	—	October 15, 2004	Mount Lemmon	Mount Lemmon Survey	·	1.1 km	MPC · JPL
573175	2008 YB_{76}	—	December 30, 2008	Mount Lemmon	Mount Lemmon Survey	·	1.1 km	MPC · JPL
573176	2008 YC_{83}	—	December 31, 2008	Kitt Peak	Spacewatch	·	1.5 km	MPC · JPL
573177	2008 YZ_{85}	—	December 4, 2008	Kitt Peak	Spacewatch	KOR	1.4 km	MPC · JPL
573178	2008 YP_{89}	—	December 29, 2008	Kitt Peak	Spacewatch	·	1 km	MPC · JPL
573179	2008 YQ_{89}	—	December 29, 2008	Kitt Peak	Spacewatch	·	1.1 km	MPC · JPL
573180	2008 YK_{91}	—	December 21, 2008	Mount Lemmon	Mount Lemmon Survey	·	540 m	MPC · JPL
573181	2008 YE_{92}	—	December 29, 2008	Kitt Peak	Spacewatch	·	1.6 km	MPC · JPL
573182	2008 YW_{93}	—	December 29, 2008	Kitt Peak	Spacewatch	·	2.0 km	MPC · JPL
573183	2008 YS_{94}	—	December 29, 2008	Kitt Peak	Spacewatch	·	970 m	MPC · JPL
573184	2008 YO_{107}	—	December 29, 2008	Kitt Peak	Spacewatch	·	1.1 km	MPC · JPL
573185	2008 YJ_{115}	—	December 21, 2008	Mount Lemmon	Mount Lemmon Survey	HNS	860 m	MPC · JPL
573186	2008 YJ_{116}	—	December 21, 2008	Kitt Peak	Spacewatch	·	1.8 km	MPC · JPL
573187	2008 YV_{118}	—	July 8, 2007	Lulin	LUSS	V	690 m	MPC · JPL
573188	2008 YL_{119}	—	October 3, 2008	Mount Lemmon	Mount Lemmon Survey	·	1.1 km	MPC · JPL
573189	2008 YY_{121}	—	December 22, 2008	Mount Lemmon	Mount Lemmon Survey	V	500 m	MPC · JPL
573190	2008 YY_{122}	—	December 22, 2008	Kitt Peak	Spacewatch	·	820 m	MPC · JPL
573191	2008 YP_{128}	—	November 30, 2003	Kitt Peak	Spacewatch	·	2.1 km	MPC · JPL
573192	2008 YV_{129}	—	December 31, 2008	Kitt Peak	Spacewatch	V	610 m	MPC · JPL
573193	2008 YQ_{133}	—	September 14, 2007	Mount Lemmon	Mount Lemmon Survey	KOR	1.3 km	MPC · JPL
573194	2008 YV_{136}	—	December 30, 2008	Kitt Peak	Spacewatch	·	470 m	MPC · JPL
573195	2008 YN_{137}	—	December 22, 2008	Kitt Peak	Spacewatch	·	780 m	MPC · JPL
573196	2008 YX_{140}	—	October 12, 2007	Anderson Mesa	LONEOS	·	1.3 km	MPC · JPL
573197	2008 YO_{142}	—	December 22, 2008	Kitt Peak	Spacewatch	·	920 m	MPC · JPL
573198	2008 YK_{147}	—	October 1, 2003	Anderson Mesa	LONEOS	·	2.3 km	MPC · JPL
573199	2008 YM_{147}	—	November 30, 2008	Mount Lemmon	Mount Lemmon Survey	BRA	1.1 km	MPC · JPL
573200	2008 YJ_{148}	—	December 28, 2008	Piszkéstető	K. Sárneczky	AST	1.7 km	MPC · JPL

== 573201–573300 ==
back to top

Designation			Discovery			Properties		Ref
Permanent	Provisional	Named after	Date	Site	Discoverer(s)	Category	Diam.	Ref
573201	2008 YS_{153}	—	December 21, 2008	Mount Lemmon	Mount Lemmon Survey	·	1.3 km	MPC · JPL
573202	2008 YL_{154}	—	December 22, 2008	Mount Lemmon	Mount Lemmon Survey	·	620 m	MPC · JPL
573203	2008 YN_{157}	—	January 21, 2002	Kitt Peak	Spacewatch	·	690 m	MPC · JPL
573204	2008 YG_{160}	—	December 31, 2008	Mount Lemmon	Mount Lemmon Survey	·	950 m	MPC · JPL
573205	2008 YQ_{161}	—	December 21, 2008	Mount Lemmon	Mount Lemmon Survey	·	1.5 km	MPC · JPL
573206	2008 YP_{164}	—	December 26, 2008	Mount Nyukasa	Japan Aerospace Exploration Agency	TIN	1.2 km	MPC · JPL
573207	2008 YO_{175}	—	December 29, 2008	Kitt Peak	Spacewatch	·	1.7 km	MPC · JPL
573208	2008 YS_{175}	—	December 20, 2008	Mount Lemmon	Mount Lemmon Survey	AGN	1.1 km	MPC · JPL
573209	2008 YF_{176}	—	December 22, 2008	Kitt Peak	Spacewatch	·	1.6 km	MPC · JPL
573210	2008 YE_{177}	—	December 21, 2008	Mount Lemmon	Mount Lemmon Survey	·	980 m	MPC · JPL
573211	2008 YG_{177}	—	December 21, 2008	Kitt Peak	Spacewatch	·	560 m	MPC · JPL
573212	2008 YY_{177}	—	December 21, 2008	Kitt Peak	Spacewatch	·	970 m	MPC · JPL
573213	2008 YD_{179}	—	May 3, 2016	Haleakala	Pan-STARRS 1	·	1.8 km	MPC · JPL
573214	2008 YZ_{179}	—	June 20, 2015	Haleakala	Pan-STARRS 1	·	1.4 km	MPC · JPL
573215	2008 YT_{180}	—	December 21, 2008	Mount Lemmon	Mount Lemmon Survey	·	1.7 km	MPC · JPL
573216	2008 YC_{183}	—	December 31, 2008	Kitt Peak	Spacewatch	·	550 m	MPC · JPL
573217	2008 YW_{183}	—	December 21, 2008	Kitt Peak	Spacewatch	·	2.1 km	MPC · JPL
573218	2008 YC_{185}	—	December 31, 2008	Catalina	CSS	·	2.0 km	MPC · JPL
573219	2008 YH_{185}	—	January 21, 2014	Mount Lemmon	Mount Lemmon Survey	·	1.9 km	MPC · JPL
573220	2008 YD_{187}	—	December 21, 2008	Kitt Peak	Spacewatch	EOS	1.4 km	MPC · JPL
573221	2008 YB_{188}	—	December 29, 2008	Kitt Peak	Spacewatch	·	1.8 km	MPC · JPL
573222	2008 YC_{188}	—	December 29, 2008	Kitt Peak	Spacewatch	·	1.2 km	MPC · JPL
573223	2008 YG_{188}	—	December 30, 2008	Kitt Peak	Spacewatch	·	770 m	MPC · JPL
573224	2008 YM_{188}	—	December 22, 2008	Kitt Peak	Spacewatch	MAS	510 m	MPC · JPL
573225	2008 YP_{190}	—	December 21, 2008	Mount Lemmon	Mount Lemmon Survey	·	1.5 km	MPC · JPL
573226	2008 YQ_{190}	—	December 29, 2008	Mount Lemmon	Mount Lemmon Survey	·	1.9 km	MPC · JPL
573227	2008 YH_{191}	—	December 30, 2008	Mount Lemmon	Mount Lemmon Survey	·	1.1 km	MPC · JPL
573228	2009 AH_{1}	—	January 2, 2009	Nazaret	Muler, G.	·	1.1 km	MPC · JPL
573229	2009 AU_{2}	—	October 19, 2003	Anderson Mesa	LONEOS	·	2.2 km	MPC · JPL
573230	2009 AU_{5}	—	January 1, 2009	Kitt Peak	Spacewatch	KOR	1.1 km	MPC · JPL
573231	2009 AG_{6}	—	January 1, 2009	Kitt Peak	Spacewatch	EOS	1.8 km	MPC · JPL
573232	2009 AY_{7}	—	January 1, 2009	Mount Lemmon	Mount Lemmon Survey	·	680 m	MPC · JPL
573233	2009 AF_{8}	—	October 8, 2007	Mount Lemmon	Mount Lemmon Survey	KOR	1.2 km	MPC · JPL
573234	2009 AD_{11}	—	November 22, 2008	Mount Lemmon	Mount Lemmon Survey	·	1.8 km	MPC · JPL
573235	2009 AK_{12}	—	January 2, 2009	Mount Lemmon	Mount Lemmon Survey	·	1.5 km	MPC · JPL
573236	2009 AM_{14}	—	January 2, 2009	Mount Lemmon	Mount Lemmon Survey	·	1.7 km	MPC · JPL
573237	2009 AQ_{22}	—	December 22, 2008	Kitt Peak	Spacewatch	NYS	720 m	MPC · JPL
573238	2009 AH_{23}	—	January 3, 2009	Kitt Peak	Spacewatch	·	2.5 km	MPC · JPL
573239	2009 AQ_{31}	—	June 21, 2007	Mount Lemmon	Mount Lemmon Survey	·	960 m	MPC · JPL
573240	2009 AL_{34}	—	December 31, 2008	Kitt Peak	Spacewatch	·	1.8 km	MPC · JPL
573241	2009 AS_{34}	—	January 15, 2009	Kitt Peak	Spacewatch	·	1.9 km	MPC · JPL
573242	2009 AL_{35}	—	January 15, 2009	Kitt Peak	Spacewatch	KOR	1.3 km	MPC · JPL
573243	2009 AX_{36}	—	January 15, 2009	Kitt Peak	Spacewatch	·	1.1 km	MPC · JPL
573244	2009 AY_{38}	—	January 15, 2009	Kitt Peak	Spacewatch	KOR	1.1 km	MPC · JPL
573245	2009 AD_{40}	—	October 18, 2007	Kitt Peak	Spacewatch	KOR	1.2 km	MPC · JPL
573246	2009 AG_{48}	—	January 2, 2009	Kitt Peak	Spacewatch	MAS	500 m	MPC · JPL
573247	2009 AA_{53}	—	January 2, 2009	Kitt Peak	Spacewatch	·	1.9 km	MPC · JPL
573248	2009 AF_{53}	—	January 8, 2016	Haleakala	Pan-STARRS 1	·	620 m	MPC · JPL
573249	2009 AV_{53}	—	January 2, 2009	Kitt Peak	Spacewatch	·	1.5 km	MPC · JPL
573250	2009 AM_{55}	—	September 23, 2011	Haleakala	Pan-STARRS 1	·	700 m	MPC · JPL
573251	2009 AT_{55}	—	September 21, 2011	Haleakala	Pan-STARRS 1	·	1.0 km	MPC · JPL
573252	2009 AN_{57}	—	November 17, 2012	Mount Lemmon	Mount Lemmon Survey	·	1.3 km	MPC · JPL
573253	2009 AT_{59}	—	January 1, 2009	Kitt Peak	Spacewatch	·	700 m	MPC · JPL
573254	2009 AG_{61}	—	January 3, 2009	Kitt Peak	Spacewatch	·	2.2 km	MPC · JPL
573255	2009 AB_{63}	—	January 2, 2009	Mount Lemmon	Mount Lemmon Survey	·	1.6 km	MPC · JPL
573256	2009 AH_{63}	—	January 2, 2009	Kitt Peak	Spacewatch	EMA	2.3 km	MPC · JPL
573257	2009 BY_{9}	—	January 16, 2009	Mount Lemmon	Mount Lemmon Survey	·	2.0 km	MPC · JPL
573258	2009 BZ_{10}	—	January 26, 2009	Mayhill	Lowe, A.	·	2.3 km	MPC · JPL
573259	2009 BC_{13}	—	January 25, 2009	Wildberg	R. Apitzsch	·	750 m	MPC · JPL
573260	2009 BS_{26}	—	December 31, 2008	Kitt Peak	Spacewatch	·	1.9 km	MPC · JPL
573261	2009 BK_{28}	—	December 29, 2008	Kitt Peak	Spacewatch	·	1.7 km	MPC · JPL
573262	2009 BP_{29}	—	December 31, 2008	Kitt Peak	Spacewatch	EOS	1.5 km	MPC · JPL
573263	2009 BQ_{33}	—	January 16, 2009	Kitt Peak	Spacewatch	·	2.0 km	MPC · JPL
573264	2009 BS_{37}	—	January 16, 2009	Kitt Peak	Spacewatch	KOR	1.2 km	MPC · JPL
573265	2009 BW_{38}	—	November 2, 2007	Mount Lemmon	Mount Lemmon Survey	THM	1.8 km	MPC · JPL
573266	2009 BS_{42}	—	January 16, 2009	Kitt Peak	Spacewatch	·	950 m	MPC · JPL
573267	2009 BY_{55}	—	January 17, 2009	Mount Lemmon	Mount Lemmon Survey	·	970 m	MPC · JPL
573268	2009 BE_{59}	—	January 2, 2009	Kitt Peak	Spacewatch	PHO	880 m	MPC · JPL
573269	2009 BP_{59}	—	April 16, 2004	Apache Point	SDSS Collaboration	H	500 m	MPC · JPL
573270	2009 BJ_{64}	—	January 20, 2009	Catalina	CSS	EOS	2.1 km	MPC · JPL
573271	2009 BG_{67}	—	January 20, 2009	Kitt Peak	Spacewatch	·	1.4 km	MPC · JPL
573272	2009 BO_{67}	—	September 26, 2006	Kitt Peak	Spacewatch	·	3.1 km	MPC · JPL
573273	2009 BM_{71}	—	January 21, 2009	Dauban	C. Rinner, Kugel, F.	PHO	720 m	MPC · JPL
573274	2009 BP_{73}	—	January 30, 2009	Wildberg	R. Apitzsch	·	1.7 km	MPC · JPL
573275	2009 BR_{80}	—	February 1, 2009	Kitt Peak	Spacewatch	NYS	890 m	MPC · JPL
573276	2009 BK_{92}	—	January 25, 2009	Kitt Peak	Spacewatch	VER	2.1 km	MPC · JPL
573277	2009 BN_{92}	—	January 25, 2009	Kitt Peak	Spacewatch	·	960 m	MPC · JPL
573278	2009 BY_{96}	—	January 25, 2009	Kitt Peak	Spacewatch	EOS	1.5 km	MPC · JPL
573279	2009 BB_{104}	—	January 25, 2009	Kitt Peak	Spacewatch	EOS	1.6 km	MPC · JPL
573280	2009 BD_{109}	—	December 22, 2008	Kitt Peak	Spacewatch	·	1.8 km	MPC · JPL
573281	2009 BS_{109}	—	January 30, 2009	Mount Lemmon	Mount Lemmon Survey	·	720 m	MPC · JPL
573282	2009 BU_{112}	—	January 31, 2009	Mount Lemmon	Mount Lemmon Survey	·	1.2 km	MPC · JPL
573283	2009 BH_{114}	—	December 22, 2008	Kitt Peak	Spacewatch	·	2.3 km	MPC · JPL
573284	2009 BD_{116}	—	January 2, 2009	Mount Lemmon	Mount Lemmon Survey	INA	1.8 km	MPC · JPL
573285	2009 BL_{119}	—	January 3, 2009	Kitt Peak	Spacewatch	·	1.2 km	MPC · JPL
573286	2009 BM_{121}	—	January 20, 2009	Kitt Peak	Spacewatch	·	2.2 km	MPC · JPL
573287	2009 BV_{126}	—	January 29, 2009	Kitt Peak	Spacewatch	·	1.6 km	MPC · JPL
573288	2009 BD_{128}	—	January 29, 2009	Mount Lemmon	Mount Lemmon Survey	·	1.3 km	MPC · JPL
573289	2009 BA_{132}	—	November 8, 2008	Mount Lemmon	Mount Lemmon Survey	·	1.9 km	MPC · JPL
573290	2009 BF_{135}	—	January 29, 2009	Kitt Peak	Spacewatch	EOS	1.3 km	MPC · JPL
573291	2009 BL_{135}	—	January 15, 2009	Kitt Peak	Spacewatch	·	1.7 km	MPC · JPL
573292	2009 BO_{136}	—	January 29, 2009	Kitt Peak	Spacewatch	·	2.2 km	MPC · JPL
573293	2009 BW_{144}	—	September 10, 2007	Kitt Peak	Spacewatch	·	1.4 km	MPC · JPL
573294	2009 BP_{152}	—	December 29, 2008	Kitt Peak	Spacewatch	·	1.8 km	MPC · JPL
573295	2009 BZ_{156}	—	January 31, 2009	Kitt Peak	Spacewatch	EOS	1.5 km	MPC · JPL
573296	2009 BB_{160}	—	December 31, 2008	Mount Lemmon	Mount Lemmon Survey	H	300 m	MPC · JPL
573297	2009 BT_{161}	—	January 25, 2009	Cerro Burek	Burek, Cerro	EOS	1.9 km	MPC · JPL
573298	2009 BY_{163}	—	January 31, 2009	Kitt Peak	Spacewatch	·	1.7 km	MPC · JPL
573299	2009 BF_{164}	—	January 16, 2009	Kitt Peak	Spacewatch	·	1.6 km	MPC · JPL
573300	2009 BQ_{164}	—	January 20, 2009	Kitt Peak	Spacewatch	·	710 m	MPC · JPL

== 573301–573400 ==
back to top

Designation			Discovery			Properties		Ref
Permanent	Provisional	Named after	Date	Site	Discoverer(s)	Category	Diam.	Ref
573301	2009 BU_{165}	—	January 31, 2009	Kitt Peak	Spacewatch	·	1.5 km	MPC · JPL
573302	2009 BK_{166}	—	January 25, 2009	Kitt Peak	Spacewatch	·	1.9 km	MPC · JPL
573303	2009 BW_{173}	—	January 25, 2009	Kitt Peak	Spacewatch	·	880 m	MPC · JPL
573304	2009 BH_{175}	—	June 7, 2004	Palomar	NEAT	H	650 m	MPC · JPL
573305	2009 BG_{179}	—	January 29, 2009	Catalina	CSS	·	350 m	MPC · JPL
573306	2009 BK_{190}	—	January 16, 2009	Mount Lemmon	Mount Lemmon Survey	·	680 m	MPC · JPL
573307	2009 BN_{190}	—	January 29, 2009	Mount Lemmon	Mount Lemmon Survey	H	450 m	MPC · JPL
573308	2009 BF_{192}	—	January 16, 2009	Mount Lemmon	Mount Lemmon Survey	·	830 m	MPC · JPL
573309	2009 BS_{192}	—	January 25, 2009	Kitt Peak	Spacewatch	V	450 m	MPC · JPL
573310	2009 BY_{192}	—	August 18, 2006	Kitt Peak	Spacewatch	·	2.4 km	MPC · JPL
573311	2009 BZ_{193}	—	January 31, 2009	Mount Lemmon	Mount Lemmon Survey	·	2.2 km	MPC · JPL
573312	2009 BD_{194}	—	January 1, 2014	Kitt Peak	Spacewatch	·	1.6 km	MPC · JPL
573313	2009 BL_{194}	—	January 16, 2009	Kitt Peak	Spacewatch	·	1.6 km	MPC · JPL
573314	2009 BQ_{194}	—	January 22, 2015	Haleakala	Pan-STARRS 1	·	2.5 km	MPC · JPL
573315	2009 BU_{194}	—	September 16, 2012	Catalina	CSS	·	2.1 km	MPC · JPL
573316	2009 BC_{195}	—	September 4, 2014	Haleakala	Pan-STARRS 1	·	510 m	MPC · JPL
573317	2009 BF_{195}	—	January 16, 2009	Kitt Peak	Spacewatch	·	480 m	MPC · JPL
573318	2009 BW_{196}	—	January 25, 2009	Kitt Peak	Spacewatch	·	1.8 km	MPC · JPL
573319	2009 BC_{197}	—	January 28, 2009	Catalina	CSS	·	1.1 km	MPC · JPL
573320	2009 BN_{197}	—	January 25, 2009	Kitt Peak	Spacewatch	·	2.5 km	MPC · JPL
573321	2009 BV_{198}	—	August 26, 2012	Haleakala	Pan-STARRS 1	·	1.8 km	MPC · JPL
573322	2009 BS_{199}	—	January 7, 2009	Kitt Peak	Spacewatch	·	570 m	MPC · JPL
573323	2009 BC_{200}	—	January 20, 2009	Kitt Peak	Spacewatch	·	2.2 km	MPC · JPL
573324	2009 BR_{201}	—	August 19, 2001	Cerro Tololo	Deep Ecliptic Survey	·	1.5 km	MPC · JPL
573325	2009 BT_{202}	—	October 28, 2016	Haleakala	Pan-STARRS 1	·	1.4 km	MPC · JPL
573326	2009 BM_{203}	—	January 18, 2009	Kitt Peak	Spacewatch	·	1.7 km	MPC · JPL
573327	2009 BG_{204}	—	March 18, 2013	Kitt Peak	Spacewatch	NYS	930 m	MPC · JPL
573328	2009 BC_{205}	—	January 21, 2009	Mount Lemmon	Mount Lemmon Survey	·	2.4 km	MPC · JPL
573329	2009 BT_{205}	—	January 31, 2009	Mount Lemmon	Mount Lemmon Survey	·	1.0 km	MPC · JPL
573330	2009 BT_{206}	—	January 18, 2009	Kitt Peak	Spacewatch	H	330 m	MPC · JPL
573331	2009 BX_{206}	—	January 16, 2009	Mount Lemmon	Mount Lemmon Survey	EOS	1.4 km	MPC · JPL
573332	2009 BW_{208}	—	January 18, 2009	Kitt Peak	Spacewatch	·	1.5 km	MPC · JPL
573333	2009 CP_{2}	—	February 2, 2009	Moletai	K. Černis, Zdanavicius, J.	·	1.1 km	MPC · JPL
573334	2009 CO_{4}	—	February 12, 2009	Calar Alto	F. Hormuth, Datson, J. C.	·	1.9 km	MPC · JPL
573335	2009 CM_{10}	—	January 18, 2009	Kitt Peak	Spacewatch	·	1.1 km	MPC · JPL
573336	2009 CS_{11}	—	October 9, 2007	Catalina	CSS	·	2.2 km	MPC · JPL
573337	2009 CB_{12}	—	August 28, 2006	Kitt Peak	Spacewatch	·	1.8 km	MPC · JPL
573338	2009 CM_{16}	—	February 1, 2009	Mount Lemmon	Mount Lemmon Survey	EOS	2.0 km	MPC · JPL
573339	2009 CB_{17}	—	February 1, 2009	Mount Lemmon	Mount Lemmon Survey	·	1.6 km	MPC · JPL
573340	2009 CN_{17}	—	October 9, 2007	Catalina	CSS	EOS	2.1 km	MPC · JPL
573341	2009 CV_{17}	—	February 3, 2009	Mount Lemmon	Mount Lemmon Survey	EOS	1.6 km	MPC · JPL
573342	2009 CQ_{18}	—	November 4, 2007	Kitt Peak	Spacewatch	·	1.6 km	MPC · JPL
573343	2009 CF_{20}	—	January 15, 2009	Kitt Peak	Spacewatch	·	2.2 km	MPC · JPL
573344	2009 CQ_{22}	—	January 3, 2009	Mount Lemmon	Mount Lemmon Survey	·	1.7 km	MPC · JPL
573345	2009 CJ_{24}	—	February 1, 2009	Kitt Peak	Spacewatch	·	1.5 km	MPC · JPL
573346	2009 CE_{28}	—	February 1, 2009	Kitt Peak	Spacewatch	·	2.0 km	MPC · JPL
573347	2009 CL_{32}	—	February 1, 2009	Kitt Peak	Spacewatch	LIX	2.5 km	MPC · JPL
573348	2009 CU_{38}	—	November 10, 2004	Kitt Peak	Spacewatch	BAP	1.1 km	MPC · JPL
573349	2009 CU_{42}	—	January 2, 2009	Kitt Peak	Spacewatch	PHO	910 m	MPC · JPL
573350	2009 CP_{50}	—	January 31, 2009	Mount Lemmon	Mount Lemmon Survey	·	2.7 km	MPC · JPL
573351	2009 CF_{52}	—	February 14, 2009	Mount Lemmon	Mount Lemmon Survey	·	790 m	MPC · JPL
573352	2009 CC_{65}	—	February 3, 2009	Kitt Peak	Spacewatch	HYG	2.2 km	MPC · JPL
573353	2009 CJ_{67}	—	February 2, 2009	Kitt Peak	Spacewatch	·	2.0 km	MPC · JPL
573354	2009 CC_{68}	—	February 20, 2014	Mount Lemmon	Mount Lemmon Survey	·	1.7 km	MPC · JPL
573355	2009 CF_{69}	—	February 3, 2009	Kitt Peak	Spacewatch	·	2.0 km	MPC · JPL
573356	2009 CK_{69}	—	February 4, 2009	Mount Lemmon	Mount Lemmon Survey	·	1.6 km	MPC · JPL
573357	2009 CY_{69}	—	March 13, 2013	Mount Lemmon	Mount Lemmon Survey	·	930 m	MPC · JPL
573358	2009 CR_{71}	—	February 1, 2009	Catalina	CSS	H	660 m	MPC · JPL
573359	2009 CS_{71}	—	October 26, 2012	Mount Lemmon	Mount Lemmon Survey	·	1.8 km	MPC · JPL
573360	2009 CT_{71}	—	February 2, 2009	Kitt Peak	Spacewatch	EOS	1.5 km	MPC · JPL
573361	2009 CX_{71}	—	February 14, 2009	Kitt Peak	Spacewatch	·	1.7 km	MPC · JPL
573362	2009 CO_{72}	—	February 2, 2009	Catalina	CSS	H	540 m	MPC · JPL
573363	2009 CA_{73}	—	March 12, 2014	Kitt Peak	Spacewatch	GEF	820 m	MPC · JPL
573364	2009 CF_{74}	—	October 1, 2011	Kitt Peak	Spacewatch	V	440 m	MPC · JPL
573365	2009 CA_{75}	—	February 17, 2004	Kitt Peak	Spacewatch	·	1.9 km	MPC · JPL
573366	2009 CU_{76}	—	February 3, 2009	Kitt Peak	Spacewatch	·	1.4 km	MPC · JPL
573367	2009 DN_{2}	—	February 16, 2009	Dauban	C. Rinner, Kugel, F.	·	1.4 km	MPC · JPL
573368	2009 DD_{10}	—	November 13, 2007	Mount Lemmon	Mount Lemmon Survey	·	1.5 km	MPC · JPL
573369	2009 DK_{13}	—	February 16, 2009	Kitt Peak	Spacewatch	·	2.8 km	MPC · JPL
573370	2009 DT_{14}	—	January 30, 2009	Mount Lemmon	Mount Lemmon Survey	TEL	2.0 km	MPC · JPL
573371	2009 DQ_{18}	—	January 25, 2009	Kitt Peak	Spacewatch	·	2.5 km	MPC · JPL
573372	2009 DE_{22}	—	January 29, 2009	Kitt Peak	Spacewatch	·	1.8 km	MPC · JPL
573373	2009 DA_{26}	—	March 15, 2004	Kitt Peak	Spacewatch	·	1.7 km	MPC · JPL
573374	2009 DF_{29}	—	September 8, 2000	Kitt Peak	Spacewatch	·	2.4 km	MPC · JPL
573375	2009 DG_{29}	—	February 23, 2009	Calar Alto	F. Hormuth	·	630 m	MPC · JPL
573376	2009 DR_{33}	—	February 20, 2009	Kitt Peak	Spacewatch	·	2.2 km	MPC · JPL
573377	2009 DV_{33}	—	February 20, 2009	Kitt Peak	Spacewatch	·	1.8 km	MPC · JPL
573378	2009 DD_{39}	—	January 16, 2009	Kitt Peak	Spacewatch	MAS	640 m	MPC · JPL
573379	2009 DC_{40}	—	February 20, 2009	Dauban	C. Rinner, Kugel, F.	·	1.1 km	MPC · JPL
573380	2009 DU_{43}	—	February 26, 2009	Kachina	Hobart, J.	·	3.0 km	MPC · JPL
573381	2009 DP_{46}	—	February 27, 2009	Piszkéstető	K. Sárneczky	·	2.2 km	MPC · JPL
573382	2009 DU_{51}	—	February 22, 2009	Kitt Peak	Spacewatch	·	2.5 km	MPC · JPL
573383	2009 DN_{52}	—	October 15, 2007	Mount Lemmon	Mount Lemmon Survey	·	1.4 km	MPC · JPL
573384	2009 DV_{53}	—	February 1, 2009	Mount Lemmon	Mount Lemmon Survey	·	2.5 km	MPC · JPL
573385	2009 DB_{58}	—	February 22, 2009	Kitt Peak	Spacewatch	H	530 m	MPC · JPL
573386	2009 DF_{60}	—	February 22, 2009	Kitt Peak	Spacewatch	·	910 m	MPC · JPL
573387	2009 DM_{61}	—	February 22, 2009	Kitt Peak	Spacewatch	·	2.2 km	MPC · JPL
573388	2009 DR_{63}	—	February 22, 2009	Kitt Peak	Spacewatch	·	2.2 km	MPC · JPL
573389	2009 DJ_{66}	—	February 3, 2009	Kitt Peak	Spacewatch	V	530 m	MPC · JPL
573390	2009 DU_{72}	—	January 18, 2004	Kitt Peak	Spacewatch	·	1.6 km	MPC · JPL
573391	2009 DH_{73}	—	February 25, 2009	Calar Alto	F. Hormuth	(8737)	2.9 km	MPC · JPL
573392	2009 DL_{73}	—	August 27, 2006	Kitt Peak	Spacewatch	·	2.1 km	MPC · JPL
573393	2009 DW_{73}	—	February 26, 2009	Kitt Peak	Spacewatch	·	2.0 km	MPC · JPL
573394	2009 DT_{74}	—	February 26, 2009	Kitt Peak	Spacewatch	·	2.7 km	MPC · JPL
573395	2009 DQ_{75}	—	February 4, 2009	Catalina	CSS	·	720 m	MPC · JPL
573396	2009 DX_{79}	—	February 21, 2009	Kitt Peak	Spacewatch	·	2.3 km	MPC · JPL
573397	2009 DM_{83}	—	March 25, 2003	Mauna Kea	B. J. Gladman, J. J. Kavelaars	·	2.3 km	MPC · JPL
573398	2009 DB_{84}	—	February 26, 2009	Kitt Peak	Spacewatch	·	2.1 km	MPC · JPL
573399	2009 DP_{86}	—	August 29, 2006	Kitt Peak	Spacewatch	EOS	1.7 km	MPC · JPL
573400	2009 DG_{87}	—	May 8, 2002	Anderson Mesa	LONEOS	·	1.1 km	MPC · JPL

== 573401–573500 ==
back to top

Designation			Discovery			Properties		Ref
Permanent	Provisional	Named after	Date	Site	Discoverer(s)	Category	Diam.	Ref
573401	2009 DW_{92}	—	February 28, 2009	Mount Lemmon	Mount Lemmon Survey	EOS	1.6 km	MPC · JPL
573402	2009 DQ_{97}	—	February 26, 2009	Kitt Peak	Spacewatch	·	1.7 km	MPC · JPL
573403	2009 DC_{98}	—	February 22, 2009	Kitt Peak	Spacewatch	THM	1.6 km	MPC · JPL
573404	2009 DV_{100}	—	February 26, 2009	Kitt Peak	Spacewatch	EOS	1.7 km	MPC · JPL
573405	2009 DJ_{101}	—	February 26, 2009	Kitt Peak	Spacewatch	·	2.1 km	MPC · JPL
573406	2009 DK_{101}	—	February 26, 2009	Kitt Peak	Spacewatch	HYG	2.6 km	MPC · JPL
573407	2009 DE_{102}	—	February 26, 2009	Kitt Peak	Spacewatch	·	970 m	MPC · JPL
573408	2009 DJ_{102}	—	October 7, 1996	Kitt Peak	Spacewatch	·	2.3 km	MPC · JPL
573409	2009 DR_{103}	—	February 26, 2009	Mount Lemmon	Mount Lemmon Survey	·	1.1 km	MPC · JPL
573410	2009 DW_{105}	—	February 26, 2009	Kitt Peak	Spacewatch	MAS	600 m	MPC · JPL
573411	2009 DP_{115}	—	February 4, 2009	Mount Lemmon	Mount Lemmon Survey	MAS	640 m	MPC · JPL
573412	2009 DM_{120}	—	February 19, 2009	Kitt Peak	Spacewatch	·	1.5 km	MPC · JPL
573413	2009 DQ_{121}	—	February 27, 2009	Kitt Peak	Spacewatch	·	2.0 km	MPC · JPL
573414	2009 DF_{123}	—	October 15, 2007	Kitt Peak	Spacewatch	·	1.0 km	MPC · JPL
573415	2009 DK_{132}	—	February 27, 2009	Kitt Peak	Spacewatch	·	890 m	MPC · JPL
573416	2009 DX_{132}	—	February 26, 2009	Kitt Peak	Spacewatch	·	2.3 km	MPC · JPL
573417	2009 DM_{133}	—	August 31, 2005	Kitt Peak	Spacewatch	·	2.2 km	MPC · JPL
573418	2009 DH_{141}	—	February 20, 2009	Kitt Peak	Spacewatch	·	1.9 km	MPC · JPL
573419	2009 DT_{142}	—	February 21, 2009	Kitt Peak	Spacewatch	NYS	990 m	MPC · JPL
573420	2009 DG_{144}	—	January 17, 2009	Mount Lemmon	Mount Lemmon Survey	·	900 m	MPC · JPL
573421	2009 DA_{145}	—	February 20, 2009	Kitt Peak	Spacewatch	·	1.0 km	MPC · JPL
573422	2009 DE_{146}	—	September 19, 2006	Catalina	CSS	·	2.4 km	MPC · JPL
573423	2009 DT_{146}	—	February 20, 2014	Mount Lemmon	Mount Lemmon Survey	·	2.0 km	MPC · JPL
573424	2009 DX_{146}	—	September 24, 2011	Mount Lemmon	Mount Lemmon Survey	·	2.2 km	MPC · JPL
573425	2009 DY_{146}	—	February 26, 2014	Haleakala	Pan-STARRS 1	·	1.4 km	MPC · JPL
573426	2009 DE_{148}	—	January 9, 2014	Mount Lemmon	Mount Lemmon Survey	·	2.2 km	MPC · JPL
573427	2009 DG_{148}	—	February 20, 2009	Kitt Peak	Spacewatch	·	2.8 km	MPC · JPL
573428	2009 DM_{148}	—	February 21, 2009	Kitt Peak	Spacewatch	·	2.8 km	MPC · JPL
573429	2009 DQ_{148}	—	April 16, 2013	Haleakala	Pan-STARRS 1	V	500 m	MPC · JPL
573430	2009 DK_{149}	—	May 13, 2015	Mount Lemmon	Mount Lemmon Survey	·	2.0 km	MPC · JPL
573431	2009 DM_{150}	—	February 26, 2014	Catalina	CSS	EUN	1.2 km	MPC · JPL
573432	2009 DY_{150}	—	February 20, 2009	Kitt Peak	Spacewatch	·	2.5 km	MPC · JPL
573433	2009 DF_{152}	—	February 19, 2009	Kitt Peak	Spacewatch	·	540 m	MPC · JPL
573434	2009 DL_{152}	—	July 14, 2016	Haleakala	Pan-STARRS 1	EOS	1.3 km	MPC · JPL
573435	2009 DQ_{153}	—	February 26, 2009	Kitt Peak	Spacewatch	·	1.3 km	MPC · JPL
573436	2009 DY_{153}	—	February 20, 2009	Kitt Peak	Spacewatch	·	2.2 km	MPC · JPL
573437	2009 DJ_{154}	—	February 28, 2009	Kitt Peak	Spacewatch	·	970 m	MPC · JPL
573438	2009 DV_{156}	—	February 28, 2009	Mount Lemmon	Mount Lemmon Survey	·	1.3 km	MPC · JPL
573439	2009 EH_{2}	—	October 16, 2006	Kitt Peak	Spacewatch	·	2.2 km	MPC · JPL
573440	2009 EY_{5}	—	March 1, 2009	Kitt Peak	Spacewatch	·	1.7 km	MPC · JPL
573441	2009 EX_{6}	—	January 31, 2009	Mount Lemmon	Mount Lemmon Survey	·	2.9 km	MPC · JPL
573442	2009 EO_{11}	—	March 2, 2009	Mount Lemmon	Mount Lemmon Survey	·	1.8 km	MPC · JPL
573443	2009 ET_{16}	—	March 15, 2009	Kitt Peak	Spacewatch	·	1.9 km	MPC · JPL
573444	2009 EH_{17}	—	February 1, 2009	Kitt Peak	Spacewatch	NYS	1.0 km	MPC · JPL
573445	2009 EG_{25}	—	March 3, 2009	Mount Lemmon	Mount Lemmon Survey	·	1.8 km	MPC · JPL
573446	2009 EJ_{25}	—	March 3, 2009	Kitt Peak	Spacewatch	·	2.7 km	MPC · JPL
573447	2009 EY_{29}	—	January 28, 2004	Catalina	CSS	·	2.2 km	MPC · JPL
573448	2009 EB_{30}	—	March 1, 2009	Mount Lemmon	Mount Lemmon Survey	·	920 m	MPC · JPL
573449	2009 EA_{31}	—	March 2, 2009	Mount Lemmon	Mount Lemmon Survey	·	1.0 km	MPC · JPL
573450	2009 EK_{32}	—	July 6, 2014	Haleakala	Pan-STARRS 1	·	760 m	MPC · JPL
573451	2009 ED_{33}	—	August 9, 2016	Haleakala	Pan-STARRS 1	·	2.1 km	MPC · JPL
573452	2009 EF_{33}	—	April 23, 2015	Haleakala	Pan-STARRS 1	·	2.0 km	MPC · JPL
573453	2009 EM_{33}	—	August 15, 2017	Haleakala	Pan-STARRS 1	PHO	650 m	MPC · JPL
573454	2009 EU_{33}	—	July 28, 2011	Flagstaff	Wasserman, L. H.	NAE	1.8 km	MPC · JPL
573455	2009 EY_{33}	—	November 17, 2011	Mount Lemmon	Mount Lemmon Survey	·	510 m	MPC · JPL
573456	2009 EE_{34}	—	March 28, 2015	Haleakala	Pan-STARRS 1	EOS	1.3 km	MPC · JPL
573457	2009 EM_{34}	—	July 17, 2013	Haleakala	Pan-STARRS 1	PHO	740 m	MPC · JPL
573458	2009 EN_{34}	—	February 22, 2009	Kitt Peak	Spacewatch	·	1.2 km	MPC · JPL
573459	2009 EQ_{35}	—	August 1, 2017	Haleakala	Pan-STARRS 1	EOS	1.7 km	MPC · JPL
573460	2009 EA_{36}	—	January 7, 2014	Mount Lemmon	Mount Lemmon Survey	·	1.5 km	MPC · JPL
573461	2009 EG_{37}	—	December 30, 2013	Mount Lemmon	Mount Lemmon Survey	·	2.0 km	MPC · JPL
573462	2009 EJ_{37}	—	August 11, 2016	Haleakala	Pan-STARRS 1	TEL	1.0 km	MPC · JPL
573463	2009 EK_{37}	—	October 18, 2012	Haleakala	Pan-STARRS 1	·	2.2 km	MPC · JPL
573464	2009 ES_{38}	—	March 2, 2009	Mount Lemmon	Mount Lemmon Survey	·	1.0 km	MPC · JPL
573465	2009 EY_{38}	—	March 3, 2009	Mount Lemmon	Mount Lemmon Survey	·	1.6 km	MPC · JPL
573466	2009 EA_{39}	—	March 1, 2009	Kitt Peak	Spacewatch	·	2.1 km	MPC · JPL
573467	2009 ED_{39}	—	March 1, 2009	Kitt Peak	Spacewatch	·	950 m	MPC · JPL
573468	2009 ED_{40}	—	March 1, 2009	Kitt Peak	Spacewatch	·	2.6 km	MPC · JPL
573469	2009 ED_{41}	—	March 3, 2009	Kitt Peak	Spacewatch	·	1.7 km	MPC · JPL
573470	2009 FN	—	March 16, 2009	Calvin-Rehoboth	L. A. Molnar	·	2.2 km	MPC · JPL
573471	2009 FM_{4}	—	September 21, 2001	Apache Point	SDSS Collaboration	EOS	1.9 km	MPC · JPL
573472	2009 FK_{5}	—	December 4, 2007	Mount Lemmon	Mount Lemmon Survey	·	2.2 km	MPC · JPL
573473	2009 FK_{12}	—	March 3, 2009	Mount Lemmon	Mount Lemmon Survey	·	1.6 km	MPC · JPL
573474	2009 FG_{13}	—	March 3, 2009	Mount Lemmon	Mount Lemmon Survey	·	1.7 km	MPC · JPL
573475	2009 FQ_{26}	—	September 12, 2001	Kitt Peak	Deep Ecliptic Survey	EOS	1.7 km	MPC · JPL
573476	2009 FF_{28}	—	March 22, 2009	Catalina	CSS	·	3.0 km	MPC · JPL
573477	2009 FD_{40}	—	March 28, 2009	Kitt Peak	Spacewatch	·	2.2 km	MPC · JPL
573478	2009 FY_{43}	—	March 29, 2009	Bergisch Gladbach	W. Bickel	·	1.6 km	MPC · JPL
573479	2009 FE_{48}	—	August 18, 2006	Kitt Peak	Spacewatch	KOR	1.3 km	MPC · JPL
573480	2009 FL_{50}	—	January 2, 2009	Kitt Peak	Spacewatch	·	2.9 km	MPC · JPL
573481	2009 FO_{51}	—	October 22, 1995	Kitt Peak	Spacewatch	·	2.4 km	MPC · JPL
573482	2009 FB_{52}	—	March 28, 2009	Mount Lemmon	Mount Lemmon Survey	·	2.1 km	MPC · JPL
573483	2009 FL_{52}	—	March 28, 2009	Mount Lemmon	Mount Lemmon Survey	·	600 m	MPC · JPL
573484	2009 FO_{52}	—	September 10, 2007	Mount Lemmon	Mount Lemmon Survey	·	770 m	MPC · JPL
573485	2009 FA_{53}	—	February 19, 2009	Catalina	CSS	·	2.5 km	MPC · JPL
573486	2009 FD_{57}	—	February 26, 2009	Catalina	CSS	T_{j} (2.98)	2.8 km	MPC · JPL
573487	2009 FC_{63}	—	March 28, 2009	Kitt Peak	Spacewatch	THM	1.8 km	MPC · JPL
573488	2009 FK_{69}	—	August 30, 2005	Palomar	NEAT	·	3.2 km	MPC · JPL
573489	2009 FC_{72}	—	March 17, 2009	Kitt Peak	Spacewatch	TIR	2.8 km	MPC · JPL
573490	2009 FQ_{74}	—	March 18, 2009	Socorro	LINEAR	THB	2.2 km	MPC · JPL
573491	2009 FM_{76}	—	March 3, 2005	Catalina	CSS	·	1.3 km	MPC · JPL
573492	2009 FQ_{80}	—	May 11, 2015	Mount Lemmon	Mount Lemmon Survey	·	2.0 km	MPC · JPL
573493	2009 FU_{80}	—	June 15, 2015	Haleakala	Pan-STARRS 1	TEL	1.3 km	MPC · JPL
573494	2009 FK_{81}	—	December 12, 2012	Mount Lemmon	Mount Lemmon Survey	·	2.1 km	MPC · JPL
573495	2009 FL_{81}	—	March 21, 2015	Haleakala	Pan-STARRS 1	·	2.2 km	MPC · JPL
573496	2009 FY_{81}	—	March 28, 2009	Kitt Peak	Spacewatch	·	1.8 km	MPC · JPL
573497	2009 FC_{83}	—	March 11, 2014	Mount Lemmon	Mount Lemmon Survey	·	1.6 km	MPC · JPL
573498	2009 FH_{83}	—	March 28, 2009	Kitt Peak	Spacewatch	MAS	660 m	MPC · JPL
573499	2009 FD_{84}	—	June 11, 2015	Haleakala	Pan-STARRS 1	·	1.9 km	MPC · JPL
573500	2009 FG_{84}	—	March 17, 2009	Kitt Peak	Spacewatch	·	540 m	MPC · JPL

== 573501–573600 ==
back to top

Designation			Discovery			Properties		Ref
Permanent	Provisional	Named after	Date	Site	Discoverer(s)	Category	Diam.	Ref
573501	2009 FR_{84}	—	April 4, 2015	Haleakala	Pan-STARRS 1	·	2.9 km	MPC · JPL
573502	2009 FW_{84}	—	March 21, 2009	Kitt Peak	Spacewatch	·	2.4 km	MPC · JPL
573503	2009 FZ_{84}	—	March 26, 2009	Mount Lemmon	Mount Lemmon Survey	·	2.3 km	MPC · JPL
573504	2009 FU_{86}	—	February 26, 2014	Haleakala	Pan-STARRS 1	·	1.6 km	MPC · JPL
573505	2009 FY_{86}	—	February 26, 2014	Haleakala	Pan-STARRS 1	·	1.6 km	MPC · JPL
573506	2009 FV_{87}	—	August 10, 2016	Haleakala	Pan-STARRS 1	·	1.7 km	MPC · JPL
573507	2009 FK_{89}	—	October 16, 2012	Mount Lemmon	Mount Lemmon Survey	·	2.3 km	MPC · JPL
573508	2009 FL_{89}	—	September 4, 2011	Kitt Peak	Spacewatch	EOS	1.3 km	MPC · JPL
573509	2009 FE_{90}	—	August 28, 2006	Kitt Peak	Spacewatch	·	980 m	MPC · JPL
573510	2009 FN_{90}	—	March 19, 2009	Kitt Peak	Spacewatch	·	2.0 km	MPC · JPL
573511	2009 FS_{90}	—	March 19, 2009	Kitt Peak	Spacewatch	·	2.4 km	MPC · JPL
573512	2009 FB_{94}	—	March 19, 2009	Mount Lemmon	Mount Lemmon Survey	VER	2.0 km	MPC · JPL
573513	2009 GF_{2}	—	November 23, 2008	Mount Lemmon	Mount Lemmon Survey	·	3.3 km	MPC · JPL
573514	2009 GT_{4}	—	April 3, 2009	Cerro Burek	Burek, Cerro	L5	8.2 km	MPC · JPL
573515	2009 GX_{6}	—	February 26, 2014	Haleakala	Pan-STARRS 1	·	1.7 km	MPC · JPL
573516	2009 GZ_{6}	—	November 22, 2012	Kitt Peak	Spacewatch	·	2.1 km	MPC · JPL
573517	2009 GL_{7}	—	April 2, 2009	Mount Lemmon	Mount Lemmon Survey	·	1.2 km	MPC · JPL
573518	2009 GT_{7}	—	March 29, 2009	Kitt Peak	Spacewatch	·	950 m	MPC · JPL
573519	2009 GH_{8}	—	March 18, 2009	Kitt Peak	Spacewatch	THM	1.9 km	MPC · JPL
573520	2009 GQ_{8}	—	April 1, 2009	Mount Lemmon	Mount Lemmon Survey	·	2.6 km	MPC · JPL
573521	2009 GV_{8}	—	April 1, 2009	Mount Lemmon	Mount Lemmon Survey	·	520 m	MPC · JPL
573522	2009 GB_{9}	—	April 2, 2009	Kitt Peak	Spacewatch	·	2.4 km	MPC · JPL
573523	2009 GG_{9}	—	April 2, 2009	Kitt Peak	Spacewatch	·	2.3 km	MPC · JPL
573524	2009 GL_{9}	—	April 2, 2009	Kitt Peak	Spacewatch	·	1.8 km	MPC · JPL
573525	2009 GS_{9}	—	April 2, 2009	Kitt Peak	Spacewatch	EOS	1.4 km	MPC · JPL
573526	2009 GT_{9}	—	April 1, 2009	Mount Lemmon	Mount Lemmon Survey	·	2.0 km	MPC · JPL
573527	2009 HZ_{3}	—	April 17, 2009	Kitt Peak	Spacewatch	·	820 m	MPC · JPL
573528	2009 HG_{5}	—	April 17, 2009	Kitt Peak	Spacewatch	·	2.4 km	MPC · JPL
573529	2009 HH_{6}	—	April 17, 2009	Kitt Peak	Spacewatch	URS	2.4 km	MPC · JPL
573530	2009 HP_{7}	—	April 2, 2009	Kitt Peak	Spacewatch	·	3.3 km	MPC · JPL
573531	2009 HU_{8}	—	April 17, 2009	Mount Lemmon	Mount Lemmon Survey	·	2.1 km	MPC · JPL
573532	2009 HX_{9}	—	April 18, 2009	Kitt Peak	Spacewatch	·	1.9 km	MPC · JPL
573533	2009 HP_{10}	—	September 13, 2007	Mount Lemmon	Mount Lemmon Survey	·	1.1 km	MPC · JPL
573534	2009 HQ_{15}	—	April 18, 2009	Kitt Peak	Spacewatch	·	1.7 km	MPC · JPL
573535	2009 HP_{16}	—	April 18, 2009	Kitt Peak	Spacewatch	·	2.2 km	MPC · JPL
573536	2009 HB_{17}	—	March 16, 2009	Kitt Peak	Spacewatch	·	1.8 km	MPC · JPL
573537	2009 HS_{17}	—	November 15, 2006	Catalina	CSS	EOS	2.0 km	MPC · JPL
573538	2009 HW_{17}	—	April 2, 2009	Mount Lemmon	Mount Lemmon Survey	·	2.3 km	MPC · JPL
573539	2009 HA_{22}	—	April 17, 2009	Kitt Peak	Spacewatch	·	2.2 km	MPC · JPL
573540	2009 HR_{22}	—	July 31, 2005	Palomar	NEAT	·	3.1 km	MPC · JPL
573541	2009 HP_{24}	—	April 17, 2009	Kitt Peak	Spacewatch	·	1.2 km	MPC · JPL
573542	2009 HM_{25}	—	April 17, 2009	Kitt Peak	Spacewatch	H	370 m	MPC · JPL
573543	2009 HY_{25}	—	April 18, 2009	Kitt Peak	Spacewatch	EOS	1.7 km	MPC · JPL
573544	2009 HX_{27}	—	October 16, 2006	Kitt Peak	Spacewatch	·	2.0 km	MPC · JPL
573545	2009 HH_{31}	—	February 2, 2008	Mount Lemmon	Mount Lemmon Survey	·	1.7 km	MPC · JPL
573546	2009 HR_{31}	—	April 19, 2009	Kitt Peak	Spacewatch	·	2.1 km	MPC · JPL
573547	2009 HS_{33}	—	April 19, 2009	Mount Lemmon	Mount Lemmon Survey	EOS	2.1 km	MPC · JPL
573548	2009 HR_{35}	—	February 10, 2008	Mount Lemmon	Mount Lemmon Survey	·	2.0 km	MPC · JPL
573549	2009 HW_{37}	—	March 24, 2009	Mount Lemmon	Mount Lemmon Survey	·	500 m	MPC · JPL
573550	2009 HO_{38}	—	August 28, 2005	Siding Spring	SSS	·	2.8 km	MPC · JPL
573551	2009 HW_{39}	—	February 20, 2009	Kitt Peak	Spacewatch	·	1.9 km	MPC · JPL
573552	2009 HC_{41}	—	April 20, 2009	Kitt Peak	Spacewatch	THM	2.1 km	MPC · JPL
573553	2009 HL_{43}	—	April 20, 2009	Kitt Peak	Spacewatch	·	2.8 km	MPC · JPL
573554	2009 HE_{47}	—	April 18, 2009	Kitt Peak	Spacewatch	NYS	910 m	MPC · JPL
573555	2009 HD_{48}	—	April 19, 2009	Kitt Peak	Spacewatch	·	3.6 km	MPC · JPL
573556	2009 HK_{48}	—	April 19, 2009	Kitt Peak	Spacewatch	·	2.8 km	MPC · JPL
573557	2009 HJ_{49}	—	October 21, 2006	Mount Lemmon	Mount Lemmon Survey	EOS	1.6 km	MPC · JPL
573558	2009 HB_{51}	—	April 21, 2009	Mount Lemmon	Mount Lemmon Survey	·	3.6 km	MPC · JPL
573559	2009 HD_{51}	—	May 19, 2004	Kitt Peak	Spacewatch	·	3.2 km	MPC · JPL
573560	2009 HM_{51}	—	April 21, 2009	Kitt Peak	Spacewatch	·	1.0 km	MPC · JPL
573561	2009 HA_{52}	—	February 9, 2005	Mount Lemmon	Mount Lemmon Survey	·	960 m	MPC · JPL
573562	2009 HB_{55}	—	April 20, 2009	Kitt Peak	Spacewatch	·	2.2 km	MPC · JPL
573563	2009 HH_{60}	—	April 21, 2009	Mount Lemmon	Mount Lemmon Survey	·	900 m	MPC · JPL
573564	2009 HB_{61}	—	October 18, 2001	Kitt Peak	Spacewatch	·	2.4 km	MPC · JPL
573565	2009 HO_{62}	—	March 21, 2009	Kitt Peak	Spacewatch	·	940 m	MPC · JPL
573566	2009 HW_{62}	—	April 22, 2009	Mount Lemmon	Mount Lemmon Survey	·	2.3 km	MPC · JPL
573567	2009 HV_{70}	—	March 31, 2009	Kitt Peak	Spacewatch	·	2.1 km	MPC · JPL
573568	2009 HC_{71}	—	April 22, 2009	Mount Lemmon	Mount Lemmon Survey	BRA	1 km	MPC · JPL
573569	2009 HM_{80}	—	March 24, 2009	Kitt Peak	Spacewatch	·	2.3 km	MPC · JPL
573570	2009 HA_{82}	—	April 26, 2009	Cerro Burek	Burek, Cerro	·	2.6 km	MPC · JPL
573571	2009 HB_{83}	—	April 2, 2009	Kitt Peak	Spacewatch	·	700 m	MPC · JPL
573572	2009 HS_{83}	—	August 28, 2006	Catalina	CSS	·	1.5 km	MPC · JPL
573573	2009 HR_{86}	—	March 29, 2009	Kitt Peak	Spacewatch	·	2.5 km	MPC · JPL
573574	2009 HV_{86}	—	March 24, 2009	Mount Lemmon	Mount Lemmon Survey	·	2.6 km	MPC · JPL
573575	2009 HD_{88}	—	April 30, 2009	Kitt Peak	Spacewatch	T_{j} (2.96)	5.3 km	MPC · JPL
573576	2009 HR_{90}	—	April 20, 2009	Mount Lemmon	Mount Lemmon Survey	H	500 m	MPC · JPL
573577	2009 HX_{94}	—	April 29, 2009	Cerro Burek	Burek, Cerro	·	2.2 km	MPC · JPL
573578	2009 HA_{95}	—	April 29, 2009	Cerro Burek	Burek, Cerro	·	2.8 km	MPC · JPL
573579	2009 HG_{96}	—	April 22, 2009	Kitt Peak	Spacewatch	·	2.6 km	MPC · JPL
573580	2009 HE_{97}	—	April 20, 2009	Mount Lemmon	Mount Lemmon Survey	·	1.9 km	MPC · JPL
573581	2009 HM_{98}	—	April 22, 2009	Mount Lemmon	Mount Lemmon Survey	·	1.9 km	MPC · JPL
573582	2009 HC_{109}	—	April 1, 2003	Apache Point	SDSS Collaboration	LIX	3.2 km	MPC · JPL
573583	2009 HV_{109}	—	February 11, 2014	Mount Lemmon	Mount Lemmon Survey	EOS	1.7 km	MPC · JPL
573584	2009 HF_{110}	—	May 22, 2015	Haleakala	Pan-STARRS 1	EOS	1.4 km	MPC · JPL
573585	2009 HO_{110}	—	November 11, 2007	Mount Lemmon	Mount Lemmon Survey	EOS	2.3 km	MPC · JPL
573586	2009 HE_{111}	—	November 7, 2012	Mount Lemmon	Mount Lemmon Survey	·	2.6 km	MPC · JPL
573587	2009 HS_{111}	—	April 10, 2014	Haleakala	Pan-STARRS 1	·	2.4 km	MPC · JPL
573588	2009 HV_{111}	—	September 6, 2016	Haleakala	Pan-STARRS 1	·	1.8 km	MPC · JPL
573589	2009 HZ_{111}	—	October 5, 2013	Haleakala	Pan-STARRS 1	·	450 m	MPC · JPL
573590	2009 HD_{112}	—	July 30, 2016	Haleakala	Pan-STARRS 1	·	2.5 km	MPC · JPL
573591	2009 HX_{112}	—	May 5, 2003	Kitt Peak	Spacewatch	TIR	2.7 km	MPC · JPL
573592	2009 HL_{113}	—	June 18, 2015	Haleakala	Pan-STARRS 1	·	2.9 km	MPC · JPL
573593	2009 HF_{114}	—	April 18, 2009	Mount Lemmon	Mount Lemmon Survey	·	2.7 km	MPC · JPL
573594	2009 HL_{117}	—	March 4, 2014	ESA OGS	ESA OGS	·	2.2 km	MPC · JPL
573595	2009 HY_{117}	—	April 5, 2014	Haleakala	Pan-STARRS 1	·	1.8 km	MPC · JPL
573596	2009 HE_{118}	—	May 8, 2013	Haleakala	Pan-STARRS 1	PHO	790 m	MPC · JPL
573597	2009 HL_{118}	—	January 18, 2016	Haleakala	Pan-STARRS 1	·	1.1 km	MPC · JPL
573598	2009 HB_{119}	—	April 22, 2009	Mount Lemmon	Mount Lemmon Survey	·	480 m	MPC · JPL
573599	2009 HD_{121}	—	April 30, 2009	Kitt Peak	Spacewatch	·	2.0 km	MPC · JPL
573600	2009 HK_{121}	—	April 21, 2009	Kitt Peak	Spacewatch	·	730 m	MPC · JPL

== 573601–573700 ==
back to top

Designation			Discovery			Properties		Ref
Permanent	Provisional	Named after	Date	Site	Discoverer(s)	Category	Diam.	Ref
573601	2009 HL_{121}	—	April 21, 2009	Mount Lemmon	Mount Lemmon Survey	·	1.0 km	MPC · JPL
573602	2009 HM_{121}	—	April 24, 2009	Mount Lemmon	Mount Lemmon Survey	·	2.5 km	MPC · JPL
573603	2009 HR_{121}	—	April 17, 2009	Kitt Peak	Spacewatch	·	2.5 km	MPC · JPL
573604	2009 HS_{121}	—	April 30, 2009	Mount Lemmon	Mount Lemmon Survey	L5	8.6 km	MPC · JPL
573605	2009 HQ_{122}	—	April 27, 2009	Mount Lemmon	Mount Lemmon Survey	THM	2.1 km	MPC · JPL
573606	2009 HE_{123}	—	April 20, 2009	Mount Lemmon	Mount Lemmon Survey	EOS	1.6 km	MPC · JPL
573607	2009 HF_{123}	—	April 30, 2009	Kitt Peak	Spacewatch	·	2.1 km	MPC · JPL
573608	2009 HG_{123}	—	April 18, 2009	Mount Lemmon	Mount Lemmon Survey	·	2.4 km	MPC · JPL
573609	2009 HK_{123}	—	April 28, 2009	Kitt Peak	Spacewatch	VER	2.4 km	MPC · JPL
573610	2009 HL_{123}	—	April 21, 2009	Mount Lemmon	Mount Lemmon Survey	·	1.9 km	MPC · JPL
573611	2009 HF_{124}	—	April 22, 2009	Mount Lemmon	Mount Lemmon Survey	·	2.2 km	MPC · JPL
573612	2009 HP_{124}	—	April 19, 2009	Kitt Peak	Spacewatch	L5	7.1 km	MPC · JPL
573613	2009 JY_{7}	—	March 10, 2005	Mount Lemmon	Mount Lemmon Survey	MAS	540 m	MPC · JPL
573614	2009 JD_{8}	—	May 4, 2009	Mount Lemmon	Mount Lemmon Survey	·	2.8 km	MPC · JPL
573615	2009 JR_{10}	—	November 19, 2007	Kitt Peak	Spacewatch	·	800 m	MPC · JPL
573616	2009 JS_{14}	—	March 8, 2003	Anderson Mesa	LONEOS	·	2.6 km	MPC · JPL
573617	2009 JK_{16}	—	May 14, 2009	Mount Lemmon	Mount Lemmon Survey	·	2.7 km	MPC · JPL
573618	2009 JR_{19}	—	December 21, 2012	Mount Lemmon	Mount Lemmon Survey	·	2.8 km	MPC · JPL
573619	2009 JV_{20}	—	February 28, 2014	Oukaïmeden	C. Rinner	·	2.6 km	MPC · JPL
573620	2009 JL_{21}	—	December 11, 2012	Mount Lemmon	Mount Lemmon Survey	·	2.5 km	MPC · JPL
573621	2009 JQ_{21}	—	December 12, 2012	Kitt Peak	Spacewatch	EOS	1.6 km	MPC · JPL
573622	2009 JR_{21}	—	May 1, 2009	Kitt Peak	Spacewatch	·	2.5 km	MPC · JPL
573623	2009 JZ_{21}	—	May 4, 2009	Mount Lemmon	Mount Lemmon Survey	·	3.1 km	MPC · JPL
573624	2009 JC_{22}	—	May 1, 2009	Mount Lemmon	Mount Lemmon Survey	·	2.3 km	MPC · JPL
573625	2009 JN_{22}	—	May 15, 2009	Kitt Peak	Spacewatch	EOS	1.5 km	MPC · JPL
573626	2009 JO_{22}	—	May 2, 2009	Mount Lemmon	Mount Lemmon Survey	·	2.5 km	MPC · JPL
573627	2009 KM_{8}	—	April 24, 2009	Kitt Peak	Spacewatch	·	2.0 km	MPC · JPL
573628	2009 KQ_{9}	—	May 25, 2009	Kitt Peak	Spacewatch	·	590 m	MPC · JPL
573629	2009 KX_{10}	—	May 25, 2009	Kitt Peak	Spacewatch	·	2.3 km	MPC · JPL
573630	2009 KS_{12}	—	May 25, 2009	Kitt Peak	Spacewatch	·	930 m	MPC · JPL
573631	2009 KA_{15}	—	August 8, 2004	Palomar	NEAT	·	3.2 km	MPC · JPL
573632	2009 KW_{15}	—	October 1, 2005	Mount Lemmon	Mount Lemmon Survey	·	2.3 km	MPC · JPL
573633	2009 KW_{20}	—	May 29, 2009	Mount Lemmon	Mount Lemmon Survey	·	1.2 km	MPC · JPL
573634	2009 KG_{26}	—	May 18, 2009	Mount Lemmon	Mount Lemmon Survey	·	1.1 km	MPC · JPL
573635	2009 KE_{27}	—	May 30, 2009	Mount Lemmon	Mount Lemmon Survey	VER	2.1 km	MPC · JPL
573636	2009 KL_{37}	—	September 21, 2011	Haleakala	Pan-STARRS 1	·	2.7 km	MPC · JPL
573637	2009 KU_{40}	—	May 30, 2009	Mount Lemmon	Mount Lemmon Survey	H	480 m	MPC · JPL
573638	2009 KX_{41}	—	March 31, 2009	Mount Lemmon	Mount Lemmon Survey	·	1.1 km	MPC · JPL
573639	2009 KD_{42}	—	May 16, 2009	Kitt Peak	Spacewatch	·	2.5 km	MPC · JPL
573640	2009 KF_{42}	—	March 8, 2014	Mount Lemmon	Mount Lemmon Survey	·	2.2 km	MPC · JPL
573641	2009 KJ_{42}	—	April 5, 2014	Haleakala	Pan-STARRS 1	EOS	1.7 km	MPC · JPL
573642	2009 KY_{42}	—	May 18, 2009	Mount Lemmon	Mount Lemmon Survey	·	1.8 km	MPC · JPL
573643	2009 KZ_{42}	—	May 24, 2009	Mount Lemmon	Mount Lemmon Survey	L5	7.6 km	MPC · JPL
573644	2009 KA_{43}	—	May 17, 2009	Mount Lemmon	Mount Lemmon Survey	L5	7.4 km	MPC · JPL
573645	2009 LR_{1}	—	April 24, 2009	Kitt Peak	Spacewatch	·	3.0 km	MPC · JPL
573646	2009 LD_{4}	—	May 1, 2009	Mount Lemmon	Mount Lemmon Survey	·	3.2 km	MPC · JPL
573647	2009 LM_{5}	—	June 14, 2009	Kitt Peak	Spacewatch	·	2.6 km	MPC · JPL
573648	2009 MK_{3}	—	February 9, 2008	Kitt Peak	Spacewatch	·	2.6 km	MPC · JPL
573649	2009 MT_{4}	—	June 21, 2009	Mount Lemmon	Mount Lemmon Survey	EUP	2.8 km	MPC · JPL
573650	2009 MM_{5}	—	January 17, 2007	Kitt Peak	Spacewatch	·	2.6 km	MPC · JPL
573651	2009 MF_{6}	—	February 9, 2008	Kitt Peak	Spacewatch	VER	2.5 km	MPC · JPL
573652	2009 MR_{10}	—	December 13, 2012	Nogales	M. Schwartz, P. R. Holvorcem	TIR	2.6 km	MPC · JPL
573653	2009 MV_{10}	—	January 16, 2011	Mount Lemmon	Mount Lemmon Survey	·	1.5 km	MPC · JPL
573654	2009 MB_{11}	—	February 15, 2013	Haleakala	Pan-STARRS 1	·	3.0 km	MPC · JPL
573655	2009 MH_{11}	—	January 12, 2016	Haleakala	Pan-STARRS 1	PHO	690 m	MPC · JPL
573656	2009 MZ_{11}	—	November 25, 2011	Haleakala	Pan-STARRS 1	·	3.6 km	MPC · JPL
573657	2009 MF_{12}	—	November 5, 2010	Mount Lemmon	Mount Lemmon Survey	·	2.6 km	MPC · JPL
573658	2009 MJ_{12}	—	October 26, 2011	Haleakala	Pan-STARRS 1	·	2.8 km	MPC · JPL
573659	2009 MN_{12}	—	June 16, 2009	Mount Lemmon	Mount Lemmon Survey	·	3.1 km	MPC · JPL
573660	2009 NL_{2}	—	August 27, 2005	Palomar	NEAT	EUN	1.4 km	MPC · JPL
573661	2009 OM_{5}	—	July 25, 2009	Marly	P. Kocher	·	4.7 km	MPC · JPL
573662	2009 OK_{12}	—	July 27, 2009	Kitt Peak	Spacewatch	·	1.1 km	MPC · JPL
573663	2009 OQ_{12}	—	July 27, 2009	Kitt Peak	Spacewatch	·	1.3 km	MPC · JPL
573664	2009 OC_{16}	—	July 28, 2009	Kitt Peak	Spacewatch	·	1.5 km	MPC · JPL
573665	2009 OH_{18}	—	August 25, 2004	Kitt Peak	Spacewatch	EOS	1.4 km	MPC · JPL
573666	2009 OL_{19}	—	July 28, 2009	Kitt Peak	Spacewatch	·	3.3 km	MPC · JPL
573667	2009 OP_{20}	—	September 19, 2001	Apache Point	SDSS Collaboration	·	1.2 km	MPC · JPL
573668	2009 OV_{21}	—	July 29, 2009	Kitt Peak	Spacewatch	·	1.8 km	MPC · JPL
573669	2009 OU_{25}	—	September 21, 2009	Mount Lemmon	Mount Lemmon Survey	NYS	1.0 km	MPC · JPL
573670	2009 OF_{26}	—	November 7, 2013	Mount Lemmon	Mount Lemmon Survey	·	1.2 km	MPC · JPL
573671	2009 OG_{26}	—	July 23, 2015	Haleakala	Pan-STARRS 1	·	3.5 km	MPC · JPL
573672	2009 OD_{27}	—	April 27, 2012	Haleakala	Pan-STARRS 1	·	580 m	MPC · JPL
573673	2009 OU_{28}	—	July 29, 2009	Kitt Peak	Spacewatch	·	1.1 km	MPC · JPL
573674	2009 PQ_{9}	—	May 2, 2008	Bergisch Gladbach	W. Bickel	MAR	860 m	MPC · JPL
573675	2009 PN_{22}	—	August 15, 2009	Kitt Peak	Spacewatch	THB	2.6 km	MPC · JPL
573676	2009 PR_{23}	—	August 15, 2009	Kitt Peak	Spacewatch	·	2.2 km	MPC · JPL
573677	2009 QZ_{4}	—	July 30, 2005	Palomar	NEAT	·	1.5 km	MPC · JPL
573678	2009 QS_{15}	—	February 19, 2001	Kitt Peak	Spacewatch	·	1.2 km	MPC · JPL
573679	2009 QP_{20}	—	August 19, 2009	Kitt Peak	Spacewatch	·	1.5 km	MPC · JPL
573680	2009 QR_{43}	—	August 27, 2009	Kitt Peak	Spacewatch	·	2.5 km	MPC · JPL
573681	2009 QP_{44}	—	April 28, 2000	Kitt Peak	Spacewatch	·	1.1 km	MPC · JPL
573682	2009 QY_{52}	—	August 27, 2009	Kitt Peak	Spacewatch	·	2.7 km	MPC · JPL
573683	2009 QE_{61}	—	August 26, 2005	Campo Imperatore	CINEOS	·	820 m	MPC · JPL
573684	2009 QC_{64}	—	August 18, 2009	Kitt Peak	Spacewatch	T_{j} (2.99) · 3:2	4.5 km	MPC · JPL
573685	2009 QU_{66}	—	December 10, 2014	Mount Lemmon	Mount Lemmon Survey	·	1.2 km	MPC · JPL
573686	2009 QE_{67}	—	August 16, 2009	Kitt Peak	Spacewatch	·	610 m	MPC · JPL
573687	2009 QH_{69}	—	January 19, 2012	Haleakala	Pan-STARRS 1	·	3.0 km	MPC · JPL
573688	2009 QX_{76}	—	August 17, 2009	Kitt Peak	Spacewatch	TIR	1.6 km	MPC · JPL
573689	2009 RC_{4}	—	September 12, 2009	Piszkéstető	K. Sárneczky	·	2.3 km	MPC · JPL
573690	2009 RZ_{9}	—	September 12, 2009	Kitt Peak	Spacewatch	·	2.5 km	MPC · JPL
573691	2009 RU_{13}	—	September 12, 2009	Kitt Peak	Spacewatch	·	1.5 km	MPC · JPL
573692	2009 RA_{17}	—	September 12, 2009	Kitt Peak	Spacewatch	L4 · 006	8.8 km	MPC · JPL
573693	2009 RS_{19}	—	September 14, 2009	Kachina	Hobart, J.	·	2.8 km	MPC · JPL
573694	2009 RX_{19}	—	September 14, 2009	Catalina	CSS	·	1.3 km	MPC · JPL
573695	2009 RB_{31}	—	October 24, 2005	Kitt Peak	Spacewatch	(5)	970 m	MPC · JPL
573696	2009 RL_{31}	—	September 14, 2009	Kitt Peak	Spacewatch	·	1.3 km	MPC · JPL
573697	2009 RU_{31}	—	September 14, 2009	Kitt Peak	Spacewatch	·	1.1 km	MPC · JPL
573698	2009 RM_{35}	—	August 28, 2000	Cerro Tololo	Deep Ecliptic Survey	·	1.3 km	MPC · JPL
573699	2009 RN_{39}	—	April 11, 2008	Kitt Peak	Spacewatch	TIR	1.9 km	MPC · JPL
573700	2009 RB_{40}	—	September 15, 2009	Kitt Peak	Spacewatch	·	1.4 km	MPC · JPL

== 573701–573800 ==
back to top

Designation			Discovery			Properties		Ref
Permanent	Provisional	Named after	Date	Site	Discoverer(s)	Category	Diam.	Ref
573701	2009 RX_{43}	—	August 18, 2009	Kitt Peak	Spacewatch	·	1.2 km	MPC · JPL
573702	2009 RF_{48}	—	September 15, 2009	Kitt Peak	Spacewatch	·	1.4 km	MPC · JPL
573703	2009 RR_{54}	—	April 1, 2003	Kitt Peak	Deep Ecliptic Survey	L4	9.3 km	MPC · JPL
573704	2009 RL_{68}	—	September 15, 2009	Kitt Peak	Spacewatch	L4	8.9 km	MPC · JPL
573705	2009 RW_{69}	—	September 15, 2009	Kitt Peak	Spacewatch	·	1.5 km	MPC · JPL
573706	2009 RA_{70}	—	October 27, 2003	Kitt Peak	Spacewatch	·	4.7 km	MPC · JPL
573707	2009 RT_{75}	—	September 15, 2009	Kitt Peak	Spacewatch	MRX	810 m	MPC · JPL
573708	2009 RE_{80}	—	September 15, 2009	Kitt Peak	Spacewatch	·	1.3 km	MPC · JPL
573709	2009 SA_{3}	—	September 16, 2009	Kitt Peak	Spacewatch	·	1.9 km	MPC · JPL
573710	2009 SK_{3}	—	September 16, 2009	Kitt Peak	Spacewatch	·	1.2 km	MPC · JPL
573711	2009 SO_{6}	—	August 18, 2009	Kitt Peak	Spacewatch	·	1.8 km	MPC · JPL
573712	2009 SG_{11}	—	October 1, 2005	Kitt Peak	Spacewatch	KON	1.7 km	MPC · JPL
573713	2009 SP_{11}	—	August 28, 2009	Kitt Peak	Spacewatch	·	1.7 km	MPC · JPL
573714	2009 ST_{12}	—	August 15, 2009	Kitt Peak	Spacewatch	EOS	1.8 km	MPC · JPL
573715	2009 SZ_{24}	—	August 17, 2009	Kitt Peak	Spacewatch	·	770 m	MPC · JPL
573716	2009 SV_{25}	—	September 19, 1998	Apache Point	SDSS	L4	10 km	MPC · JPL
573717	2009 SM_{27}	—	September 16, 2009	Kitt Peak	Spacewatch	·	910 m	MPC · JPL
573718	2009 SL_{34}	—	September 16, 2009	Kitt Peak	Spacewatch	·	610 m	MPC · JPL
573719	2009 SA_{42}	—	August 15, 2009	Kitt Peak	Spacewatch	·	2.9 km	MPC · JPL
573720	2009 SR_{42}	—	September 16, 2009	Kitt Peak	Spacewatch	·	1.6 km	MPC · JPL
573721	2009 SS_{44}	—	March 26, 2007	Mount Lemmon	Mount Lemmon Survey	·	1.4 km	MPC · JPL
573722	2009 SK_{49}	—	September 17, 2009	Kitt Peak	Spacewatch	·	1.1 km	MPC · JPL
573723	2009 SK_{62}	—	October 7, 2005	Kitt Peak	Spacewatch	·	810 m	MPC · JPL
573724	2009 SR_{63}	—	September 17, 2009	Mount Lemmon	Mount Lemmon Survey	·	2.4 km	MPC · JPL
573725	2009 SC_{78}	—	July 29, 2009	Kitt Peak	Spacewatch	·	950 m	MPC · JPL
573726	2009 SW_{78}	—	August 28, 2000	Cerro Tololo	Deep Ecliptic Survey	·	1.7 km	MPC · JPL
573727	2009 SQ_{80}	—	February 23, 2007	Mount Lemmon	Mount Lemmon Survey	·	1.1 km	MPC · JPL
573728	2009 SS_{89}	—	September 18, 2009	Mount Lemmon	Mount Lemmon Survey	EUN	870 m	MPC · JPL
573729	2009 SW_{94}	—	September 14, 2005	Kitt Peak	Spacewatch	·	1.9 km	MPC · JPL
573730	2009 SK_{98}	—	September 22, 2009	Črni Vrh	Mikuž, H.	·	5.0 km	MPC · JPL
573731 Matsnev	2009 SE_{101}	Matsnev	September 23, 2009	Zelenchukskaya Station	T. V. Krjačko, B. Satovski	·	950 m	MPC · JPL
573732	2009 SR_{106}	—	September 16, 2009	Mount Lemmon	Mount Lemmon Survey	·	1.3 km	MPC · JPL
573733	2009 SD_{119}	—	November 19, 2003	Kitt Peak	Spacewatch	·	4.1 km	MPC · JPL
573734	2009 SY_{123}	—	September 18, 2009	Kitt Peak	Spacewatch	SYL	3.2 km	MPC · JPL
573735	2009 SE_{151}	—	September 20, 2003	Kitt Peak	Spacewatch	·	3.0 km	MPC · JPL
573736	2009 SK_{153}	—	August 15, 2009	Kitt Peak	Spacewatch	·	1.4 km	MPC · JPL
573737	2009 SL_{157}	—	October 21, 2006	Kitt Peak	Spacewatch	·	760 m	MPC · JPL
573738	2009 SM_{160}	—	September 20, 2009	Kitt Peak	Spacewatch	·	1.9 km	MPC · JPL
573739	2009 SG_{165}	—	July 27, 2009	Kitt Peak	Spacewatch	·	1.0 km	MPC · JPL
573740	2009 SM_{172}	—	September 25, 2005	Kitt Peak	Spacewatch	(5)	840 m	MPC · JPL
573741	2009 SO_{175}	—	July 18, 2004	Socorro	LINEAR	·	2.1 km	MPC · JPL
573742	2009 SB_{177}	—	September 20, 2009	Kitt Peak	Spacewatch	HNS	930 m	MPC · JPL
573743	2009 SZ_{179}	—	October 25, 2005	Kitt Peak	Spacewatch	·	1.2 km	MPC · JPL
573744	2009 SA_{190}	—	September 22, 2009	Kitt Peak	Spacewatch	·	1.2 km	MPC · JPL
573745	2009 ST_{193}	—	September 29, 2005	Kitt Peak	Spacewatch	EUN	1.1 km	MPC · JPL
573746	2009 SZ_{193}	—	September 22, 2009	Kitt Peak	Spacewatch	·	1.2 km	MPC · JPL
573747	2009 SW_{195}	—	October 4, 2005	Mount Lemmon	Mount Lemmon Survey	·	1.1 km	MPC · JPL
573748	2009 SS_{200}	—	September 2, 2005	Palomar	NEAT	·	1.2 km	MPC · JPL
573749	2009 SW_{208}	—	September 23, 2009	Kitt Peak	Spacewatch	·	3.0 km	MPC · JPL
573750	2009 SP_{210}	—	September 23, 2009	Kitt Peak	Spacewatch	MAS	770 m	MPC · JPL
573751	2009 SJ_{220}	—	January 24, 2007	Mount Lemmon	Mount Lemmon Survey	·	950 m	MPC · JPL
573752	2009 SQ_{223}	—	January 27, 2007	Kitt Peak	Spacewatch	·	1.1 km	MPC · JPL
573753	2009 SL_{228}	—	January 28, 2007	Mount Lemmon	Mount Lemmon Survey	·	1.5 km	MPC · JPL
573754	2009 SK_{236}	—	October 30, 2005	Kitt Peak	Spacewatch	·	1.0 km	MPC · JPL
573755	2009 SB_{247}	—	September 18, 2009	Kitt Peak	Spacewatch	L4	6.4 km	MPC · JPL
573756	2009 SX_{256}	—	August 29, 2009	Kitt Peak	Spacewatch	·	2.4 km	MPC · JPL
573757	2009 SG_{258}	—	September 22, 2003	Kitt Peak	Spacewatch	·	3.0 km	MPC · JPL
573758	2009 SF_{266}	—	February 23, 2007	Kitt Peak	Spacewatch	·	1.5 km	MPC · JPL
573759 Rocheva	2009 SV_{267}	Rocheva	September 17, 2009	Zelenchukskaya Station	T. V. Krjačko, B. Satovski	L4	7.8 km	MPC · JPL
573760	2009 SM_{269}	—	March 13, 2003	Kitt Peak	Spacewatch	·	1.2 km	MPC · JPL
573761	2009 SW_{282}	—	September 17, 2009	Kitt Peak	Spacewatch	·	240 m	MPC · JPL
573762	2009 SE_{284}	—	October 21, 2001	Kitt Peak	Spacewatch	(5)	830 m	MPC · JPL
573763	2009 SC_{286}	—	August 27, 2009	Kitt Peak	Spacewatch	EUN	950 m	MPC · JPL
573764	2009 SD_{292}	—	October 28, 2005	Mount Lemmon	Mount Lemmon Survey	·	1.6 km	MPC · JPL
573765	2009 SP_{302}	—	September 16, 2009	Kitt Peak	Spacewatch	·	3.1 km	MPC · JPL
573766	2009 SC_{304}	—	September 16, 2009	Kitt Peak	Spacewatch	·	1.5 km	MPC · JPL
573767	2009 SN_{323}	—	September 23, 2009	Mount Lemmon	Mount Lemmon Survey	·	840 m	MPC · JPL
573768	2009 SM_{326}	—	March 26, 2007	Mount Lemmon	Mount Lemmon Survey	·	1.6 km	MPC · JPL
573769	2009 SV_{327}	—	October 26, 2005	Kitt Peak	Spacewatch	·	1.3 km	MPC · JPL
573770	2009 SO_{360}	—	September 29, 2009	Mount Lemmon	Mount Lemmon Survey	HNS	860 m	MPC · JPL
573771	2009 SV_{366}	—	December 27, 2005	Mount Lemmon	Mount Lemmon Survey	·	1.7 km	MPC · JPL
573772	2009 SR_{373}	—	September 18, 2009	Catalina	CSS	·	1.8 km	MPC · JPL
573773	2009 SY_{374}	—	August 29, 2009	Kitt Peak	Spacewatch	·	1.2 km	MPC · JPL
573774	2009 SY_{375}	—	March 14, 2016	Haleakala	Pan-STARRS 1	·	950 m	MPC · JPL
573775	2009 SF_{376}	—	May 13, 2013	Mount Lemmon	Mount Lemmon Survey	·	2.6 km	MPC · JPL
573776	2009 SG_{376}	—	January 15, 2015	Haleakala	Pan-STARRS 1	·	1.1 km	MPC · JPL
573777	2009 SF_{377}	—	December 15, 2014	Mount Lemmon	Mount Lemmon Survey	·	1.4 km	MPC · JPL
573778	2009 SE_{378}	—	October 12, 2016	Mount Lemmon	Mount Lemmon Survey	SYL	3.4 km	MPC · JPL
573779	2009 SB_{379}	—	March 16, 2016	Mount Lemmon	Mount Lemmon Survey	·	1.0 km	MPC · JPL
573780	2009 SH_{379}	—	August 15, 2013	Haleakala	Pan-STARRS 1	·	1.1 km	MPC · JPL
573781	2009 SL_{379}	—	September 28, 2009	Mount Lemmon	Mount Lemmon Survey	·	2.5 km	MPC · JPL
573782	2009 SO_{379}	—	February 23, 2012	Mount Lemmon	Mount Lemmon Survey	·	2.5 km	MPC · JPL
573783	2009 SQ_{380}	—	September 28, 2009	Kitt Peak	Spacewatch	·	1.3 km	MPC · JPL
573784	2009 ST_{380}	—	September 27, 2009	Kitt Peak	Spacewatch	·	2.5 km	MPC · JPL
573785	2009 SE_{383}	—	April 10, 2013	Haleakala	Pan-STARRS 1	·	2.2 km	MPC · JPL
573786	2009 SS_{383}	—	September 1, 2014	Kitt Peak	Spacewatch	·	2.3 km	MPC · JPL
573787	2009 SU_{383}	—	September 19, 2009	Mount Lemmon	Mount Lemmon Survey	URS	2.4 km	MPC · JPL
573788	2009 SK_{385}	—	March 17, 2012	Mount Lemmon	Mount Lemmon Survey	3:2	4.3 km	MPC · JPL
573789	2009 SU_{386}	—	September 17, 2009	Kitt Peak	Spacewatch	·	1.5 km	MPC · JPL
573790	2009 SR_{389}	—	December 13, 2010	Kitt Peak	Spacewatch	·	2.3 km	MPC · JPL
573791	2009 SK_{398}	—	September 16, 2009	Kitt Peak	Spacewatch	·	1.2 km	MPC · JPL
573792	2009 SD_{399}	—	September 28, 2009	Mount Lemmon	Mount Lemmon Survey	·	2.9 km	MPC · JPL
573793	2009 SG_{399}	—	September 20, 2009	Kitt Peak	Spacewatch	L4	9.5 km	MPC · JPL
573794	2009 SO_{399}	—	September 29, 2009	Mount Lemmon	Mount Lemmon Survey	MRX	740 m	MPC · JPL
573795	2009 SR_{399}	—	September 28, 2009	Mount Lemmon	Mount Lemmon Survey	·	1.3 km	MPC · JPL
573796	2009 SW_{399}	—	September 27, 2009	Mount Lemmon	Mount Lemmon Survey	·	2.0 km	MPC · JPL
573797	2009 SL_{400}	—	September 28, 2009	Mount Lemmon	Mount Lemmon Survey	·	2.9 km	MPC · JPL
573798	2009 SV_{409}	—	September 27, 2009	Kitt Peak	Spacewatch	·	1.4 km	MPC · JPL
573799	2009 SD_{414}	—	September 27, 2009	Kitt Peak	Spacewatch	·	1.7 km	MPC · JPL
573800	2009 TP_{4}	—	October 12, 2009	Marly	P. Kocher	·	2.4 km	MPC · JPL

== 573801–573900 ==
back to top

Designation			Discovery			Properties		Ref
Permanent	Provisional	Named after	Date	Site	Discoverer(s)	Category	Diam.	Ref
573801	2009 TB_{12}	—	October 14, 2009	Bergisch Gladbach	W. Bickel	·	1.8 km	MPC · JPL
573802	2009 TF_{28}	—	October 6, 2002	Palomar	NEAT	·	560 m	MPC · JPL
573803	2009 TE_{30}	—	October 29, 2005	Kitt Peak	Spacewatch	·	770 m	MPC · JPL
573804	2009 TK_{37}	—	September 29, 2009	Mount Lemmon	Mount Lemmon Survey	·	1.2 km	MPC · JPL
573805	2009 TC_{52}	—	October 15, 2009	Mount Lemmon	Mount Lemmon Survey	·	2.0 km	MPC · JPL
573806	2009 TF_{52}	—	May 16, 2012	Mount Lemmon	Mount Lemmon Survey	·	1.3 km	MPC · JPL
573807	2009 TR_{52}	—	March 2, 2016	Kitt Peak	Spacewatch	H	400 m	MPC · JPL
573808	2009 TR_{53}	—	October 1, 2009	Mount Lemmon	Mount Lemmon Survey	L4	9.3 km	MPC · JPL
573809	2009 TS_{53}	—	November 29, 2014	Mount Lemmon	Mount Lemmon Survey	·	1.7 km	MPC · JPL
573810	2009 TF_{56}	—	October 15, 2009	Mount Lemmon	Mount Lemmon Survey	·	580 m	MPC · JPL
573811	2009 UC_{1}	—	September 18, 2009	Mount Lemmon	Mount Lemmon Survey	(5)	960 m	MPC · JPL
573812	2009 UY_{3}	—	October 17, 2009	Catalina	CSS	·	2.1 km	MPC · JPL
573813	2009 UK_{7}	—	October 16, 2009	Mount Lemmon	Mount Lemmon Survey	·	1.2 km	MPC · JPL
573814 Sergeyzvyagin	2009 UO_{14}	Sergeyzvyagin	October 19, 2009	Zelenchukskaya Stn	T. V. Krjačko, Satovski, B.	HNS	1.5 km	MPC · JPL
573815	2009 UE_{17}	—	October 22, 2009	Mount Lemmon	Mount Lemmon Survey	·	1.3 km	MPC · JPL
573816	2009 UU_{17}	—	September 24, 2009	Črni Vrh	Vales, J.	EUN	1.6 km	MPC · JPL
573817	2009 UF_{18}	—	October 15, 2009	Kitt Peak	Spacewatch	·	500 m	MPC · JPL
573818	2009 UB_{27}	—	October 21, 2009	Catalina	CSS	RAF	640 m	MPC · JPL
573819	2009 UW_{30}	—	October 18, 2009	Mount Lemmon	Mount Lemmon Survey	·	1.2 km	MPC · JPL
573820	2009 UE_{31}	—	October 18, 2009	Mount Lemmon	Mount Lemmon Survey	·	1.4 km	MPC · JPL
573821	2009 UW_{31}	—	April 1, 2003	Palomar	NEAT	·	1.7 km	MPC · JPL
573822	2009 UQ_{32}	—	September 22, 2009	Mount Lemmon	Mount Lemmon Survey	(5)	1.0 km	MPC · JPL
573823	2009 UV_{42}	—	October 18, 2009	Mount Lemmon	Mount Lemmon Survey	PAD	1.2 km	MPC · JPL
573824	2009 UK_{50}	—	January 26, 2007	Kitt Peak	Spacewatch	MIS	2.5 km	MPC · JPL
573825	2009 UK_{53}	—	September 14, 2009	Kitt Peak	Spacewatch	·	920 m	MPC · JPL
573826	2009 UB_{56}	—	October 30, 2005	Mount Lemmon	Mount Lemmon Survey	·	1.1 km	MPC · JPL
573827	2009 UQ_{56}	—	October 23, 2009	Mount Lemmon	Mount Lemmon Survey	L4	7.4 km	MPC · JPL
573828	2009 UX_{65}	—	October 17, 2009	Mount Lemmon	Mount Lemmon Survey	·	1.4 km	MPC · JPL
573829	2009 UX_{67}	—	September 29, 2009	Kitt Peak	Spacewatch	NAE	1.7 km	MPC · JPL
573830	2009 UT_{74}	—	September 16, 2009	Kitt Peak	Spacewatch	·	1.1 km	MPC · JPL
573831	2009 UQ_{76}	—	September 18, 2009	Kitt Peak	Spacewatch	·	1.6 km	MPC · JPL
573832	2009 US_{83}	—	January 22, 2006	Mount Lemmon	Mount Lemmon Survey	·	1.6 km	MPC · JPL
573833	2009 UY_{101}	—	October 24, 2009	Catalina	CSS	NYS	970 m	MPC · JPL
573834	2009 UT_{105}	—	October 21, 2009	Mount Lemmon	Mount Lemmon Survey	·	1.4 km	MPC · JPL
573835	2009 UW_{105}	—	October 21, 2009	Mount Lemmon	Mount Lemmon Survey	L4	9.7 km	MPC · JPL
573836	2009 UU_{106}	—	October 22, 2009	Mount Lemmon	Mount Lemmon Survey	·	1.1 km	MPC · JPL
573837	2009 UW_{111}	—	October 24, 2009	Kitt Peak	Spacewatch	·	1.5 km	MPC · JPL
573838	2009 UP_{128}	—	September 16, 2009	Kitt Peak	Spacewatch	·	1.5 km	MPC · JPL
573839	2009 UY_{133}	—	October 22, 2009	Mount Lemmon	Mount Lemmon Survey	·	1.3 km	MPC · JPL
573840	2009 UP_{134}	—	October 23, 2009	Mount Lemmon	Mount Lemmon Survey	KOR	1.3 km	MPC · JPL
573841	2009 UD_{142}	—	October 9, 2008	Mount Lemmon	Mount Lemmon Survey	L4	7.4 km	MPC · JPL
573842	2009 UC_{155}	—	October 26, 2009	Mount Lemmon	Mount Lemmon Survey	HNS	1.1 km	MPC · JPL
573843	2009 US_{155}	—	August 17, 2009	Kitt Peak	Spacewatch	·	1.3 km	MPC · JPL
573844	2009 UV_{160}	—	October 27, 2009	Kitt Peak	Spacewatch	(5)	1.1 km	MPC · JPL
573845	2009 UF_{161}	—	October 17, 2009	Catalina	CSS	·	1.1 km	MPC · JPL
573846	2009 UH_{162}	—	May 20, 2012	Haleakala	Pan-STARRS 1	MAR	970 m	MPC · JPL
573847	2009 UM_{162}	—	October 18, 2009	Mount Lemmon	Mount Lemmon Survey	·	600 m	MPC · JPL
573848	2009 UO_{162}	—	October 23, 2009	Mount Lemmon	Mount Lemmon Survey	L4	10 km	MPC · JPL
573849	2009 UP_{162}	—	October 16, 2009	Mount Lemmon	Mount Lemmon Survey	·	1.8 km	MPC · JPL
573850	2009 UJ_{165}	—	April 9, 2016	Haleakala	Pan-STARRS 1	·	1.2 km	MPC · JPL
573851	2009 UL_{167}	—	October 23, 2009	Mount Lemmon	Mount Lemmon Survey	·	1.5 km	MPC · JPL
573852	2009 UZ_{167}	—	October 23, 2009	Mount Lemmon	Mount Lemmon Survey	·	1.5 km	MPC · JPL
573853	2009 UN_{168}	—	October 23, 2009	Mount Lemmon	Mount Lemmon Survey	(895)	2.4 km	MPC · JPL
573854	2009 UV_{168}	—	October 27, 2009	Mount Lemmon	Mount Lemmon Survey	·	3.2 km	MPC · JPL
573855	2009 UZ_{169}	—	November 2, 2010	Mount Lemmon	Mount Lemmon Survey	L4	8.6 km	MPC · JPL
573856	2009 UW_{171}	—	October 26, 2009	Kitt Peak	Spacewatch	·	640 m	MPC · JPL
573857	2009 UF_{181}	—	October 18, 2009	Mount Lemmon	Mount Lemmon Survey	·	1.1 km	MPC · JPL
573858	2009 UQ_{181}	—	October 27, 2009	Kitt Peak	Spacewatch	·	2.0 km	MPC · JPL
573859	2009 UA_{185}	—	October 23, 2009	Mount Lemmon	Mount Lemmon Survey	·	1.9 km	MPC · JPL
573860	2009 UF_{185}	—	October 27, 2009	Kitt Peak	Spacewatch	·	1.1 km	MPC · JPL
573861	2009 VE_{7}	—	November 8, 2009	Catalina	CSS	·	1.7 km	MPC · JPL
573862	2009 VP_{8}	—	November 8, 2009	Mount Lemmon	Mount Lemmon Survey	·	1.5 km	MPC · JPL
573863	2009 VT_{11}	—	November 8, 2009	Mount Lemmon	Mount Lemmon Survey	·	1.0 km	MPC · JPL
573864	2009 VA_{13}	—	November 8, 2009	Mount Lemmon	Mount Lemmon Survey	·	1.0 km	MPC · JPL
573865	2009 VH_{13}	—	November 8, 2009	Mount Lemmon	Mount Lemmon Survey	·	1.3 km	MPC · JPL
573866	2009 VG_{14}	—	November 8, 2009	Mount Lemmon	Mount Lemmon Survey	·	1.7 km	MPC · JPL
573867	2009 VK_{14}	—	September 22, 2009	Mount Lemmon	Mount Lemmon Survey	·	540 m	MPC · JPL
573868	2009 VR_{16}	—	July 28, 2008	Mount Lemmon	Mount Lemmon Survey	·	2.5 km	MPC · JPL
573869	2009 VX_{18}	—	November 9, 2009	Kitt Peak	Spacewatch	EUN	1.1 km	MPC · JPL
573870	2009 VY_{19}	—	March 15, 2007	Kitt Peak	Spacewatch	·	1.2 km	MPC · JPL
573871	2009 VC_{21}	—	January 8, 2006	Kitt Peak	Spacewatch	·	1.4 km	MPC · JPL
573872	2009 VW_{21}	—	November 9, 2009	Mount Lemmon	Mount Lemmon Survey	·	750 m	MPC · JPL
573873	2009 VN_{23}	—	September 19, 2009	Mount Lemmon	Mount Lemmon Survey	·	1.5 km	MPC · JPL
573874	2009 VY_{23}	—	July 30, 2008	Mount Lemmon	Mount Lemmon Survey	·	3.0 km	MPC · JPL
573875	2009 VF_{27}	—	October 24, 2009	Kitt Peak	Spacewatch	·	1.7 km	MPC · JPL
573876	2009 VR_{29}	—	November 2, 2000	Kitt Peak	Spacewatch	·	1.5 km	MPC · JPL
573877	2009 VG_{35}	—	November 10, 2009	Mount Lemmon	Mount Lemmon Survey	·	2.7 km	MPC · JPL
573878	2009 VC_{47}	—	September 22, 2009	Mount Lemmon	Mount Lemmon Survey	·	630 m	MPC · JPL
573879	2009 VD_{50}	—	November 12, 2009	La Sagra	OAM	·	1.0 km	MPC · JPL
573880	2009 VW_{52}	—	September 21, 2009	Mount Lemmon	Mount Lemmon Survey	L4	7.9 km	MPC · JPL
573881	2009 VX_{52}	—	November 10, 2009	Mount Lemmon	Mount Lemmon Survey	·	1.5 km	MPC · JPL
573882	2009 VM_{54}	—	October 23, 2009	Mount Lemmon	Mount Lemmon Survey	·	1.4 km	MPC · JPL
573883	2009 VE_{74}	—	September 21, 2009	Mount Lemmon	Mount Lemmon Survey	·	1.2 km	MPC · JPL
573884	2009 VE_{81}	—	October 23, 2009	Mount Lemmon	Mount Lemmon Survey	GEF	1.2 km	MPC · JPL
573885	2009 VP_{82}	—	October 30, 2009	Mount Lemmon	Mount Lemmon Survey	EUN	980 m	MPC · JPL
573886	2009 VD_{83}	—	November 9, 2009	Kitt Peak	Spacewatch	·	1.6 km	MPC · JPL
573887	2009 VT_{85}	—	November 10, 2009	Kitt Peak	Spacewatch	·	1.1 km	MPC · JPL
573888	2009 VX_{85}	—	March 15, 2002	Mount Hamilton	M. W. Buie	(17392)	1.6 km	MPC · JPL
573889	2009 VO_{91}	—	November 8, 2009	Catalina	CSS	·	1.5 km	MPC · JPL
573890	2009 VJ_{93}	—	January 7, 2006	Kitt Peak	Spacewatch	·	890 m	MPC · JPL
573891	2009 VZ_{98}	—	April 20, 2007	Kitt Peak	Spacewatch	·	1.7 km	MPC · JPL
573892	2009 VM_{101}	—	November 10, 2009	Kitt Peak	Spacewatch	·	1.7 km	MPC · JPL
573893	2009 VN_{101}	—	November 10, 2009	Kitt Peak	Spacewatch	·	770 m	MPC · JPL
573894	2009 VB_{108}	—	September 22, 2009	Mount Lemmon	Mount Lemmon Survey	·	1.3 km	MPC · JPL
573895	2009 VT_{119}	—	November 9, 2009	Mount Lemmon	Mount Lemmon Survey	(5)	910 m	MPC · JPL
573896	2009 VC_{120}	—	November 10, 2009	Mount Lemmon	Mount Lemmon Survey	MAR	770 m	MPC · JPL
573897	2009 VO_{120}	—	November 26, 2013	Haleakala	Pan-STARRS 1	·	1.1 km	MPC · JPL
573898	2009 VU_{120}	—	November 8, 2009	Mount Lemmon	Mount Lemmon Survey	HNS	880 m	MPC · JPL
573899	2009 VW_{120}	—	October 17, 2009	Mount Lemmon	Mount Lemmon Survey	·	590 m	MPC · JPL
573900	2009 VJ_{121}	—	October 25, 2009	Kitt Peak	Spacewatch	H	380 m	MPC · JPL

== 573901–574000 ==
back to top

Designation			Discovery			Properties		Ref
Permanent	Provisional	Named after	Date	Site	Discoverer(s)	Category	Diam.	Ref
573901	2009 VW_{122}	—	November 9, 2009	Kitt Peak	Spacewatch	KON	2.0 km	MPC · JPL
573902	2009 VA_{124}	—	October 12, 2013	Mount Lemmon	Mount Lemmon Survey	·	1.3 km	MPC · JPL
573903	2009 VD_{126}	—	November 9, 2009	Mount Lemmon	Mount Lemmon Survey	GEF	1.0 km	MPC · JPL
573904	2009 WY	—	November 16, 2009	Kitt Peak	Spacewatch	·	1.8 km	MPC · JPL
573905	2009 WG_{17}	—	May 1, 2003	Kitt Peak	Spacewatch	·	1.7 km	MPC · JPL
573906	2009 WW_{19}	—	November 17, 2009	Kitt Peak	Spacewatch	·	1.0 km	MPC · JPL
573907	2009 WR_{39}	—	November 17, 2009	Kitt Peak	Spacewatch	·	440 m	MPC · JPL
573908	2009 WV_{42}	—	November 17, 2009	Mount Lemmon	Mount Lemmon Survey	·	1.4 km	MPC · JPL
573909	2009 WL_{51}	—	January 9, 2006	Kitt Peak	Spacewatch	·	1.6 km	MPC · JPL
573910	2009 WG_{59}	—	October 22, 2009	Mount Lemmon	Mount Lemmon Survey	·	1.4 km	MPC · JPL
573911	2009 WC_{60}	—	October 23, 2009	Mount Lemmon	Mount Lemmon Survey	·	1.4 km	MPC · JPL
573912	2009 WC_{62}	—	September 19, 2009	Mount Lemmon	Mount Lemmon Survey	·	2.0 km	MPC · JPL
573913	2009 WD_{66}	—	October 18, 2009	Mount Lemmon	Mount Lemmon Survey	KOR	1.2 km	MPC · JPL
573914	2009 WO_{76}	—	November 18, 2009	Kitt Peak	Spacewatch	·	1.7 km	MPC · JPL
573915	2009 WR_{78}	—	November 8, 2009	Mount Lemmon	Mount Lemmon Survey	·	1.2 km	MPC · JPL
573916	2009 WM_{79}	—	September 20, 2009	Mount Lemmon	Mount Lemmon Survey	·	1.9 km	MPC · JPL
573917	2009 WO_{80}	—	November 18, 2009	Kitt Peak	Spacewatch	JUN	1.1 km	MPC · JPL
573918	2009 WM_{86}	—	November 11, 2009	Kitt Peak	Spacewatch	·	1.2 km	MPC · JPL
573919	2009 WZ_{87}	—	November 9, 2009	Mount Lemmon	Mount Lemmon Survey	·	2.5 km	MPC · JPL
573920	2009 WJ_{91}	—	November 25, 2005	Kitt Peak	Spacewatch	·	1.3 km	MPC · JPL
573921	2009 WL_{91}	—	December 5, 2005	Mount Lemmon	Mount Lemmon Survey	·	1.4 km	MPC · JPL
573922	2009 WB_{93}	—	November 19, 2008	Mount Lemmon	Mount Lemmon Survey	·	2.1 km	MPC · JPL
573923	2009 WM_{93}	—	November 19, 2009	Mount Lemmon	Mount Lemmon Survey	·	1.7 km	MPC · JPL
573924	2009 WC_{94}	—	October 27, 2005	Kitt Peak	Spacewatch	·	1.3 km	MPC · JPL
573925	2009 WK_{97}	—	November 20, 2009	Mount Lemmon	Mount Lemmon Survey	·	1.5 km	MPC · JPL
573926	2009 WG_{101}	—	November 22, 2009	Kitt Peak	Spacewatch	MAR	840 m	MPC · JPL
573927	2009 WT_{103}	—	November 22, 2009	Mount Lemmon	Mount Lemmon Survey	·	1.9 km	MPC · JPL
573928	2009 WO_{105}	—	November 21, 2009	Modra	Š. Gajdoš, J. Világi	EUN	880 m	MPC · JPL
573929	2009 WP_{111}	—	April 24, 2003	Kitt Peak	Spacewatch	·	1.6 km	MPC · JPL
573930	2009 WH_{112}	—	November 17, 2009	Mount Lemmon	Mount Lemmon Survey	·	2.4 km	MPC · JPL
573931	2009 WQ_{112}	—	March 31, 2003	Kitt Peak	Spacewatch	·	1.6 km	MPC · JPL
573932	2009 WU_{112}	—	October 23, 2009	Mount Lemmon	Mount Lemmon Survey	L4	10 km	MPC · JPL
573933	2009 WW_{112}	—	September 29, 2009	Kitt Peak	Spacewatch	·	1.5 km	MPC · JPL
573934	2009 WB_{115}	—	September 22, 2009	Mount Lemmon	Mount Lemmon Survey	·	3.1 km	MPC · JPL
573935	2009 WS_{120}	—	November 20, 2009	Kitt Peak	Spacewatch	·	1.3 km	MPC · JPL
573936	2009 WB_{127}	—	November 20, 2009	Kitt Peak	Spacewatch	·	1.2 km	MPC · JPL
573937	2009 WW_{129}	—	November 20, 2009	Mount Lemmon	Mount Lemmon Survey	·	590 m	MPC · JPL
573938	2009 WG_{134}	—	November 22, 2009	Catalina	CSS	EUN	1.1 km	MPC · JPL
573939	2009 WK_{135}	—	November 23, 2009	Kitt Peak	Spacewatch	·	1.5 km	MPC · JPL
573940	2009 WA_{137}	—	October 27, 2009	Kitt Peak	Spacewatch	·	1.6 km	MPC · JPL
573941	2009 WB_{137}	—	November 23, 2009	Mount Lemmon	Mount Lemmon Survey	·	900 m	MPC · JPL
573942	2009 WC_{137}	—	April 22, 2007	Mount Lemmon	Mount Lemmon Survey	AGN	990 m	MPC · JPL
573943	2009 WW_{139}	—	December 19, 2001	Kitt Peak	Spacewatch	(5)	1.4 km	MPC · JPL
573944	2009 WZ_{139}	—	November 26, 2005	Kitt Peak	Spacewatch	·	850 m	MPC · JPL
573945	2009 WJ_{140}	—	November 18, 2009	Mount Lemmon	Mount Lemmon Survey	·	1.7 km	MPC · JPL
573946	2009 WF_{144}	—	November 11, 2009	Kitt Peak	Spacewatch	·	1.2 km	MPC · JPL
573947	2009 WR_{147}	—	November 19, 2009	Mount Lemmon	Mount Lemmon Survey	·	1.0 km	MPC · JPL
573948	2009 WL_{149}	—	October 12, 2009	Mount Lemmon	Mount Lemmon Survey	(5)	900 m	MPC · JPL
573949	2009 WO_{152}	—	November 19, 2009	Mount Lemmon	Mount Lemmon Survey	·	1.1 km	MPC · JPL
573950	2009 WH_{154}	—	November 19, 2009	Mount Lemmon	Mount Lemmon Survey	·	1.5 km	MPC · JPL
573951	2009 WC_{157}	—	October 27, 2009	Mount Lemmon	Mount Lemmon Survey	EUN	950 m	MPC · JPL
573952	2009 WF_{161}	—	November 21, 2009	Kitt Peak	Spacewatch	EUN	1.1 km	MPC · JPL
573953	2009 WG_{162}	—	March 13, 2007	Kitt Peak	Spacewatch	·	1.5 km	MPC · JPL
573954	2009 WK_{162}	—	November 9, 2009	Mount Lemmon	Mount Lemmon Survey	EUN	1.2 km	MPC · JPL
573955	2009 WV_{164}	—	April 19, 2006	Mount Lemmon	Mount Lemmon Survey	THM	2.4 km	MPC · JPL
573956	2009 WA_{165}	—	August 28, 2005	Kitt Peak	Spacewatch	MAS	680 m	MPC · JPL
573957	2009 WF_{169}	—	November 22, 2009	Kitt Peak	Spacewatch	·	860 m	MPC · JPL
573958	2009 WV_{173}	—	December 6, 2005	Kitt Peak	Spacewatch	(5)	1.3 km	MPC · JPL
573959	2009 WZ_{175}	—	November 11, 2009	Kitt Peak	Spacewatch	·	1.8 km	MPC · JPL
573960	2009 WS_{180}	—	September 4, 2008	Kitt Peak	Spacewatch	·	3.6 km	MPC · JPL
573961	2009 WF_{181}	—	November 23, 2009	Kitt Peak	Spacewatch	·	3.3 km	MPC · JPL
573962	2009 WQ_{183}	—	December 25, 2005	Kitt Peak	Spacewatch	·	1.3 km	MPC · JPL
573963	2009 WE_{186}	—	October 9, 2008	Mount Lemmon	Mount Lemmon Survey	L4	6.6 km	MPC · JPL
573964	2009 WE_{192}	—	October 24, 2009	Kitt Peak	Spacewatch	·	870 m	MPC · JPL
573965	2009 WB_{199}	—	October 2, 2000	Apache Point	SDSS Collaboration	ADE	2.1 km	MPC · JPL
573966	2009 WF_{206}	—	October 22, 2009	Mount Lemmon	Mount Lemmon Survey	·	1.2 km	MPC · JPL
573967	2009 WF_{208}	—	November 17, 2009	Kitt Peak	Spacewatch	·	1.3 km	MPC · JPL
573968	2009 WC_{210}	—	November 18, 2009	Kitt Peak	Spacewatch	L4	8.2 km	MPC · JPL
573969	2009 WE_{211}	—	November 18, 2009	Kitt Peak	Spacewatch	·	1.6 km	MPC · JPL
573970	2009 WG_{211}	—	November 10, 2009	Kitt Peak	Spacewatch	·	1.5 km	MPC · JPL
573971	2009 WW_{221}	—	November 16, 2009	Mount Lemmon	Mount Lemmon Survey	·	2.2 km	MPC · JPL
573972	2009 WB_{223}	—	November 16, 2009	Kitt Peak	Spacewatch	·	1.0 km	MPC · JPL
573973	2009 WY_{223}	—	October 12, 2009	Mount Lemmon	Mount Lemmon Survey	·	1.6 km	MPC · JPL
573974	2009 WS_{224}	—	September 26, 2000	Apache Point	SDSS	·	1.5 km	MPC · JPL
573975	2009 WR_{229}	—	November 17, 2009	Mount Lemmon	Mount Lemmon Survey	·	1.0 km	MPC · JPL
573976	2009 WA_{231}	—	November 17, 2009	Mount Lemmon	Mount Lemmon Survey	·	1.5 km	MPC · JPL
573977	2009 WD_{231}	—	September 19, 2009	Mount Lemmon	Mount Lemmon Survey	·	1.2 km	MPC · JPL
573978	2009 WM_{232}	—	November 17, 2009	Mount Lemmon	Mount Lemmon Survey	JUN	1.0 km	MPC · JPL
573979	2009 WJ_{238}	—	November 17, 2009	Mount Lemmon	Mount Lemmon Survey	·	1.1 km	MPC · JPL
573980	2009 WL_{238}	—	November 17, 2009	Mount Lemmon	Mount Lemmon Survey	·	1.3 km	MPC · JPL
573981	2009 WP_{240}	—	October 30, 2009	Mount Lemmon	Mount Lemmon Survey	·	1.4 km	MPC · JPL
573982	2009 WM_{241}	—	November 18, 2009	Mount Lemmon	Mount Lemmon Survey	·	2.6 km	MPC · JPL
573983	2009 WQ_{241}	—	November 18, 2009	Mount Lemmon	Mount Lemmon Survey	AGN	1.1 km	MPC · JPL
573984	2009 WG_{242}	—	November 19, 2009	Kitt Peak	Spacewatch	·	1.3 km	MPC · JPL
573985	2009 WR_{245}	—	April 25, 2007	Kitt Peak	Spacewatch	·	1.3 km	MPC · JPL
573986	2009 WM_{248}	—	November 17, 2009	Mount Lemmon	Mount Lemmon Survey	·	1.3 km	MPC · JPL
573987	2009 WE_{251}	—	April 23, 2007	Kitt Peak	Spacewatch	·	2.4 km	MPC · JPL
573988	2009 WU_{255}	—	November 20, 2009	Kitt Peak	Spacewatch	·	1.2 km	MPC · JPL
573989	2009 WQ_{268}	—	October 5, 2005	Catalina	CSS	NYS	1.1 km	MPC · JPL
573990	2009 WF_{271}	—	November 17, 2009	Mount Lemmon	Mount Lemmon Survey	·	1.9 km	MPC · JPL
573991	2009 WQ_{272}	—	October 3, 2013	Haleakala	Pan-STARRS 1	·	1.1 km	MPC · JPL
573992	2009 WT_{272}	—	October 1, 2013	Kitt Peak	Spacewatch	·	1.3 km	MPC · JPL
573993	2009 WZ_{272}	—	November 17, 2009	Mount Lemmon	Mount Lemmon Survey	·	1.5 km	MPC · JPL
573994	2009 WB_{273}	—	November 1, 2013	Catalina	CSS	·	1.8 km	MPC · JPL
573995	2009 WK_{273}	—	September 15, 2013	Haleakala	Pan-STARRS 1	EUN	780 m	MPC · JPL
573996	2009 WP_{273}	—	November 11, 2013	Kitt Peak	Spacewatch	·	1.5 km	MPC · JPL
573997	2009 WX_{273}	—	January 14, 2016	Mount Lemmon	Mount Lemmon Survey	·	1.6 km	MPC · JPL
573998	2009 WP_{275}	—	November 20, 2009	Kitt Peak	Spacewatch	·	1.5 km	MPC · JPL
573999	2009 WV_{275}	—	October 15, 2013	Catalina	CSS	·	2.0 km	MPC · JPL
574000	2009 WG_{278}	—	November 20, 2009	Kitt Peak	Spacewatch	·	1.7 km	MPC · JPL

back to top

== Meaning of names ==
As minor planet discoveries are confirmed, they are given a permanent number by the IAU's Minor Planet Center (MPC), and the discoverers can then submit names for them, following the IAU's naming conventions. The list below concerns those minor planets in the specified number-range that have received names, and explains the meanings of those names.

Official naming citations of newly named small Solar System bodies are approved and published in a bulletin by IAU's Working Group for Small Bodies Nomenclature (WGSBN). Before May 2021, citations were published in MPC's Minor Planet Circulars for many decades. Recent citations can also be found on the JPL Small-Body Database (SBDB). Until his death in 2016, German astronomer Lutz D. Schmadel compiled these citations into the Dictionary of Minor Planet Names (DMP) and regularly updated the collection.

Based on Paul Herget's The Names of the Minor Planets, Schmadel also researched the unclear origin of numerous asteroids, most of which had been named prior to World War II. This article incorporates text from this source, which is in the public domain: SBDB New namings may only be added to this list below after official publication as the preannouncement of names is condemned. The WGSBN publishes a comprehensive guideline for the naming rules of non-cometary small Solar System bodies.

Named minor planet	Provisional	This minor planet was named for...	Ref · Catalog
573731 Matsnev	2009 SE_{101}	Dmitrii Vladimirovich Matsnev (born 1971), Russian astronomer studying variable stars and astroarchaeologist.	IAU · 573731
573759 Rocheva	2009 SV_{267}	Nina Rocheva (1948–2022), cross-country skier who won a silver medal in the 4 x 5 km relay at the 1980 Lake Placid, New York Winter Olympics.	IAU · 573759
573814 Sergeyzvyagin	2009 UO_{14}	Sergey A. Zvyagin (born 1954), Russian yacht captain who is the initiator and organiser of sailing expeditions to the Arctic.	IAU · 573814
