= Gas-rich meteorites =

Meteorites with high levels of primordial gases

Gas-rich meteorites are meteorites with high levels of primordial gases, such as helium, neon, argon, krypton, xenon and sometimes other elements. Though these gases are present "in virtually all meteorites," the Fayetteville meteorite has, in standard notation, 2,000,000x10^{-8}ccSTP/g or ~2% helium by volume equivalent. In comparison, background level is a few ppm.

The identification of gas-rich meteorites is based on the presence of light noble gases in large amounts, at levels which cannot be explained without involving an additional component over and above the well-known noble gas components that are present in all meteorites.

== History ==
William Ramsay was the first to report helium in an iron meteorite, in 1895—not long after its first Earth sample, instead of via solar observation.

The use of decay products to date meteorites was suggested by Bauer in 1947, and explicitly published by Gerling and Pavlova in 1951. However, this soon resulted in wildly varying ages; it was realized excess helium (including helium-3, rare on Earth) was generated by radiation, too.

The first explicit publication of a gas-rich meteorite was Staroe Pesyanoe (often shortened to Pesyanoe), by Gerling and Levskii in 1956. In family with the later Fayetteville, Pesyanoe's helium level is about 1,000,000x10^{-8} ccSTP/g.

Reynolds' publication of a "general Xe anomaly", including ^{129}I decay products and more, touched off the subfield of xenology, continuing to today.

The first publication of presolar grains in the 1980s was precipitated by workers searching for noble gases; PSGs were not simply checked via their gas contents.

== Lines of inquiry ==
As unreactive components, they are tracers of processes throughout and predating the Solar System:

Material age can be determined by relative exposure to direct solar and cosmic radiation (by cosmic ray tracks), and indirect creation of resultant nuclides. This includes Ar-Ar dating, I-Xe dating, and U to its various decay products including helium.

The parent body of a meteorite can be traced in part via comparison of trace elements. That meteorites are fragments of asteroids, and conditions on such asteroids, were partially deduced from gas evidence.

This includes meteorite pairing, the re-association of meteorites which had split before recovery.

Meteorite, parent, and Solar System histories are indicated by tracer elements, including thermometry, a record of material temperature.

- Presolar activity.
- A supernova thought to have preceded the Solar System.
- The history of the Sun. This record extends to billion-year timescales, back to "very early in the life of the Sun".
- The history of cosmic ray fluence. Meteorites do not show significant variation of cosmic rays over time.

The Lost City Meteor was tracked, allowing an orbit determination back to the asteroid belt. Measurement of relatively short-half-life isotopes in the subsequent Lost City Meteorite then indicate radiation levels in that region of the Solar System.

== Gas study ==
The field of meteoritic gases follows progress in analytical methods.

The first analyses were basic laboratory chemistry, such as acid dissolution. Various acids were necessary, due to mixtures of various soluble and insoluble minerals. Stepped etching gave higher levels of resolution and discrimination.

Pyrolysis was used, such as on highly acid resistant minerals. These two methods were alternately lauded and derided as "burning the haystack to find the needle."

Meteoritical studies have tracked the progress of mass spectrometry, a continual and rapid progression comparable to or greater than Moore's Law.

More recently, laser extraction

=== Standard Notation ===
Gas levels are given in units of "N x 10^{-8} ccSTP/g", as this produces integer values for most gases, in most meteorites.

== Meteorites ==
This meteoritics-related list is incomplete; you can help by expanding it.

Name	Classification	Date	Provenance	Ref
Pantar	H5	1938	Fall	
Fayetteville	H4	1934	Fall	
Gladstone	H4	1936	Find	
Noblesville	H4	1991	Fall	
Tsukuba	H5-6	1996	Fall	
Weston	H4	1807	Fall	
Willard	H3	1934	Find	
Elm Creek	H4	1906	Find	
Leighton	H5	1907	Fall	
Djermaia	H	1961	Fall	
Acfer 111	-H3	1990	Find	
Ghubara	L5	1954	Find	
St. Mesmin	L5	1866	Fall	
(Staroe) Pesyanoe	Aubrite	1933	Fall	
Khor Temiki	Aubrite	1932	Fall	
Bustee	Aubrite	1852	Fall	
Jodzie	Howardite	1877	Fall	
Kapoeta	Howardite	1942	Fall	3,
South Oman	-EH	1958	Find	

Interplanetary dust, like c-chondrites and enstatites, contains hosts for these gases and often measurable gas contents. So too do a fraction of micrometeorites.

== Gas ==
Gas components were first named by descriptors, then letter codes; the letter taxonomy "has become increasingly complicated and confusing with time."

=== By nuclide ===
Type	Nuclides
Primordial/trapped	^{36}Ar ^{132}Xe
Solar wind/solar flare	^{4}He ^{20}Ne ^{36}Ar
Cosmic ray/spallogenic	^{3}He ^{83}Kr ^{126}Xe
Radiogenic/fissile	^{3}He ^{36}Ar ^{40}Ar ^{129}Xe ^{132}Xe ^{134}Xe ^{136}Xe ^{128}Xe

=== By component ===
A, Original Black 1972 letter code. Soon found to be redundant.

B, C, D

Original Black 1972 letter codes, attributed by him to the solar wind.

E

Original Black 1972 letter code for "Exotic" neon- aberrant ^{20}Ne/^{22}Ne values.

Planetary

"Planetary" gases (often shortened to "P") are depleted in light elements (He, Ne) compared to solar abundances (see below), or conversely, enriched in Kr, Xe. This name originally implied an origin, the gas blend observed in terrestrial planets. Scientists wished to stop implying this, but the habit was retained.

P1, P2

Further developments of P, when all letters of the Latin alphabet were taken.

Q, Q1, Q2

Different primordial gas blend, and its follow-on descriptors, when all letters of the Latin alphabet were taken.

Solar, subsolar

This gas component corresponds to the solar wind. Solar flare gas can be distinguished by its greater depth, and a slightly variant composition. "Subsolar" is intermediary between solar and planetary.

H

"Heavy" isotopes of xenon, primarily r-process isotopes, plus p-process. Thus, sometimes seen as "HL," anomalous heavy and light isotopes.

G

"Giant", after asymptotic giant branch (while A and B had been taken); contains their s-process isotopes.

== See also ==
- Activated carbon
- Clathrate
- Cryopump
- Getter
- Hydrogen embrittlement
- Ion implantation
- Molecular sieve and Molecular distillation
- Outgassing
