= Claxton meteorite =

Meteorite found in the United States

Claxton
- Type: Chondrite
- Class: Ordinary chondrite
- Group: L6
- Country: United States of America
- Region: Georgia
- Coordinates: 32°09′N 81°54′W
- Observed fall: Yes
- Fall date: December 10, 1984
- Found date: December 9, 1984
- TKW: 1.46 kg

Claxton is an L6 chondrite meteorite that fell to earth on December 10, 1984 in Georgia, United States. It is the only known meteorite to directly strike a mailbox.

== Mailbox strike ==
According to the eyewitness account of Claxton, Georgia resident Don Richardson, the meteorite struck his neighbor's mailbox about 36 metres (118 ft) from his position. The rear of the mailbox was crushed and the mailbox was knocked to the ground. A collector bought the mailbox from the homeowner and sold it to the Macovich Collection where it is valued at $60,000–$80,000.

== Classification ==
It is an ordinary chondrite type L6 with a light grey interior containing chondrules and free iron.

== See also ==
- Glossary of meteoritics
- Meteorite falls
- Ordinary chondrite
