= Kesen meteorite =

Meteorite found in Japan

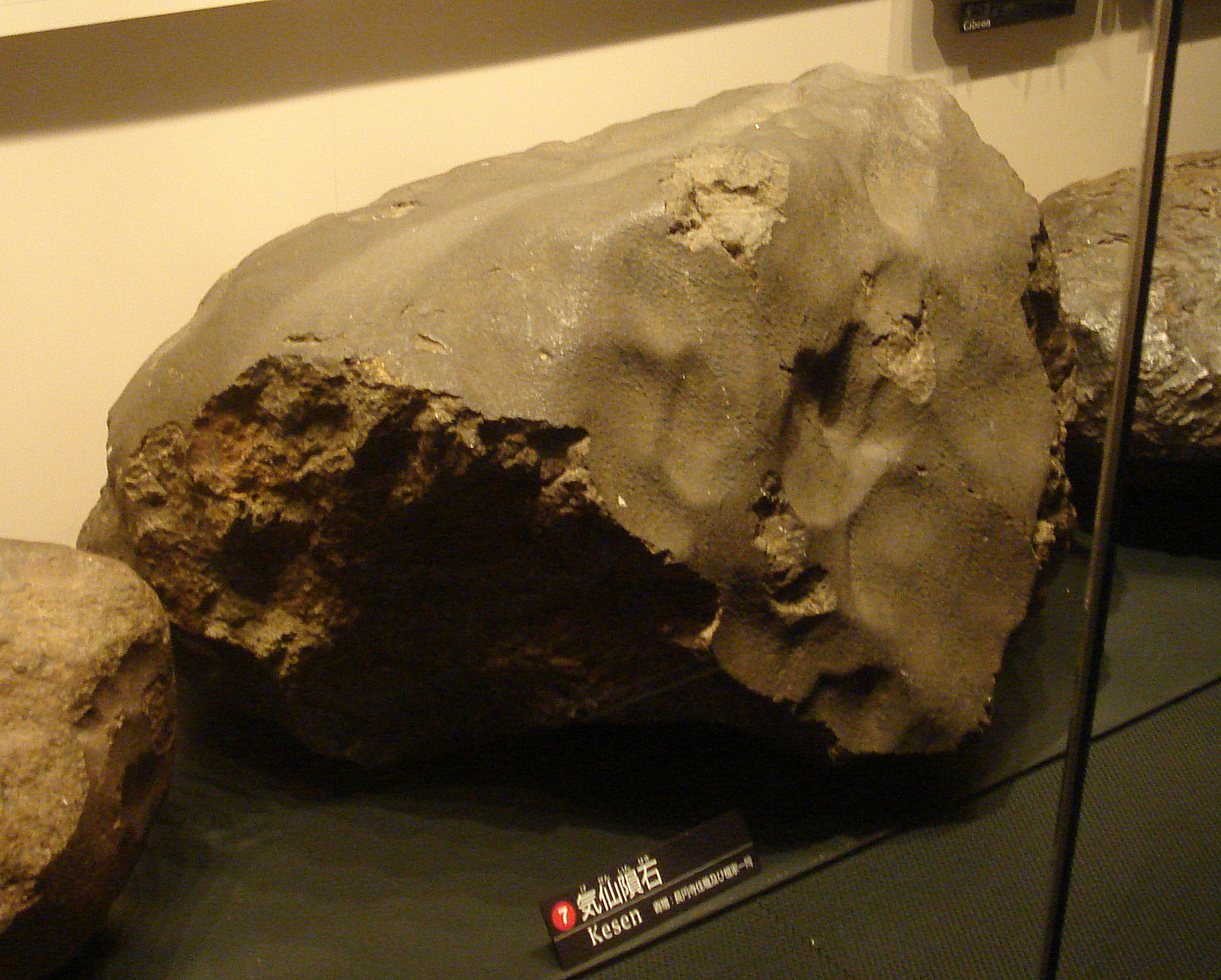
- Kesen meteorite, main mass
- Type: Chondrite
- Class: Ordinary chondrite
- Group: H4
- Country: Japan
- Region: Rikuzentakata, Kesen District, Iwate Prefecture
- Coordinates: 38°59′N 141°37′E
- Fall date: 13 June 1850
- TKW: 135 kilograms (298 lb)

The Kesen meteorite fell on 13 June 1850, landing in a swamp in the outskirts of the city of Rikuzentakata, Kesen District in Iwate Prefecture, Japan.

== Classification ==
It was classified as a H4-type ordinary chondrite.

== Main mass ==
The meteorite initially weighed 135 kilograms (298 lb), however some local residents cut off pieces for charms or souvenirs such that its current weight is 106 kilograms (234 lb). The meteorite was moved to Tokyo where it was held in the Imperial Household Museum. It is currently housed at the National Museum of Nature and Science, Tokyo. A full-scale replica was housed at the Rikuzentakata Municipal Museum until it was lost in the 2011 Tōhoku tsunami.

== See also ==
- Glossary of meteoritics
