= Arbol Solo (meteorite) =

Meteorite

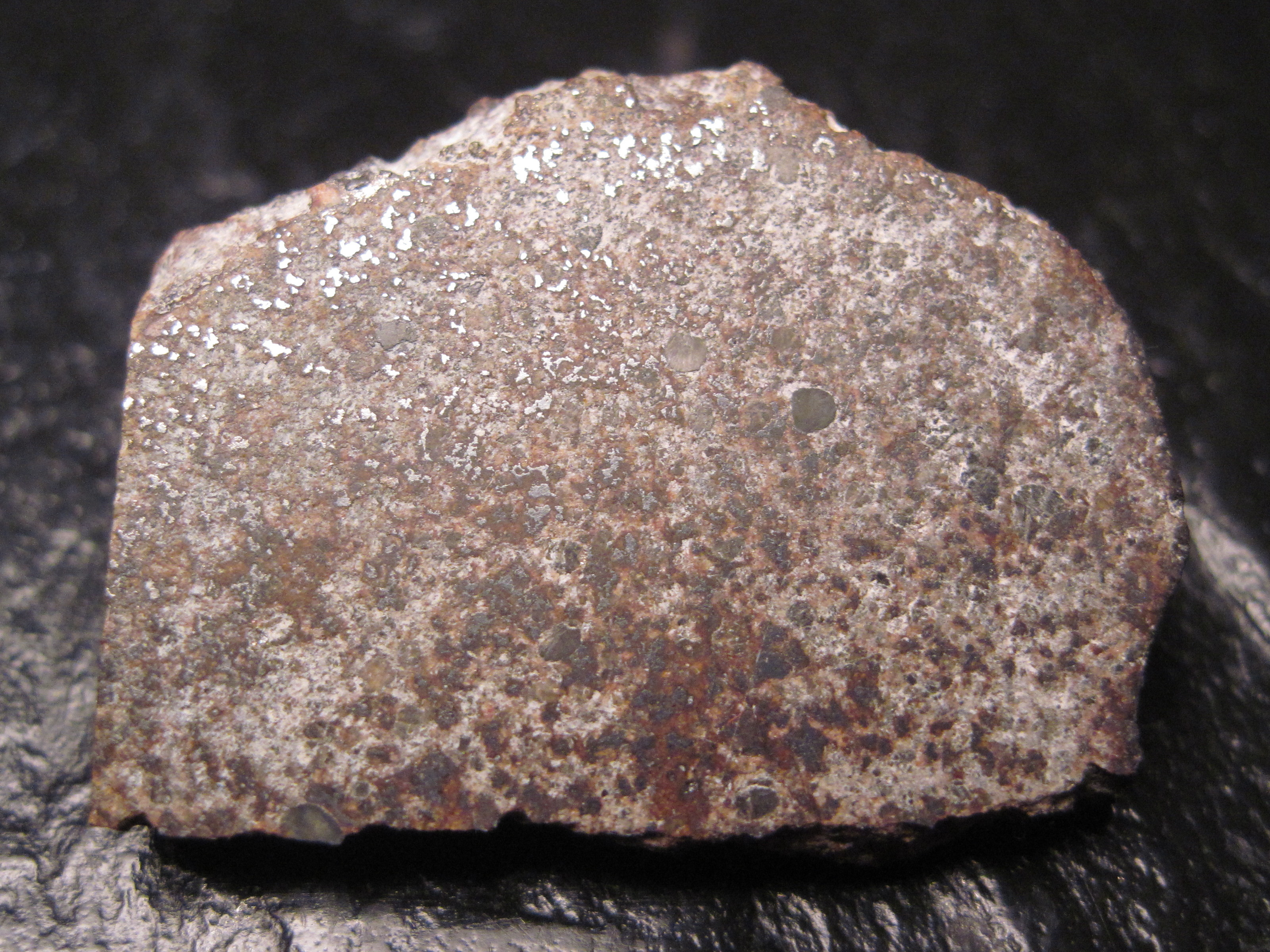
- 5.38 g slice
- Type: Chondrite
- Class: Ordinary chondrite
- Group: H5
- Country: Argentina
- Region: San Luis Province
- Coordinates: 33°S 66°W
- Observed fall: Yes
- Fall date: September 11, 1954
- TKW: 810 g

Arbol Solo is an H chondrite meteorite that fell to earth on September 11, 1954, in the province of San Luis, Argentina.

== Classification ==
It is classified as H5-ordinary chondrite.

== See also ==
- Glossary of meteoritics
- Meteorite falls
- Ordinary chondrite
