= Northwest Africa 3009 =

Meteorite found in Northwest Africa

NWA 3009 meteorite
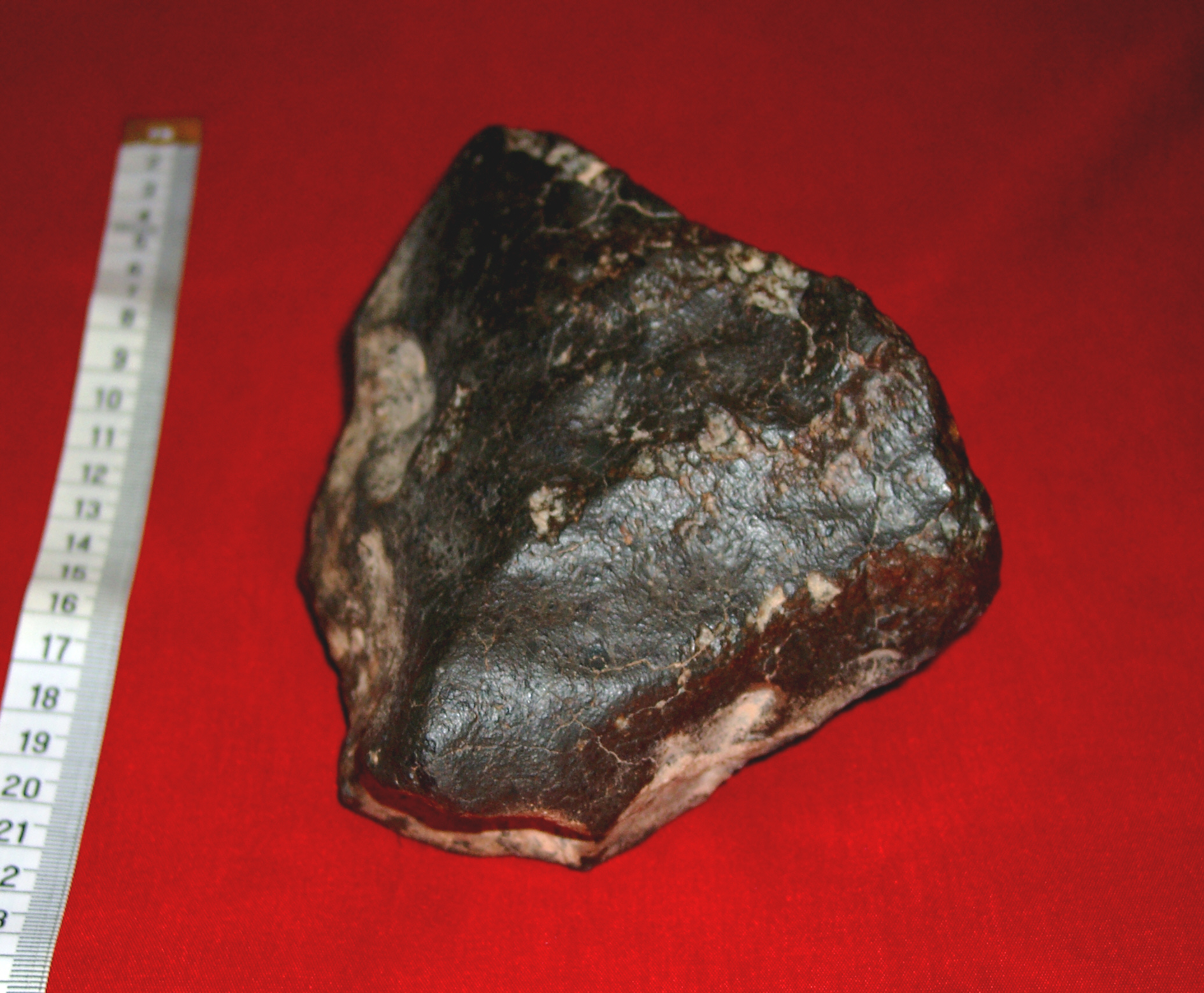
- Type: Chondrite
- Class: Ordinary chondrite
- Group: L4-6
- Shock stage: S3
- Weathering grade: W2
- Country: Northwest Africa
- Region: Zag, Morocco
- Observed fall: No
- Found date: 2001
- TKW: 1.5 kilograms (3.3 lb)
- Alternative names: Northwest Africa 3009

The NWA 3009 meteorite was found in Northwest Africa during 2001.

== Name ==
Meteorites are usually named after the village nearest their place of discovery. Those found in the deserts of Northwest Africa have mostly been called NWA (for Northwest Africa) followed by a serial number.

== History ==
Like all L chondrites NWA 3009 probably comes from the asteroid 433 Eros, which may have collided millions of years ago with another fragment in the asteroid belt. The debris from the collision departed on an eccentric path, eventually crossing Earth's orbit and impacting as meteorites. The reflectance spectra of Eros correspond quite accurately with those of the L-and LL-chondrites.

It is held in a private collection in Oldenburg, Lower Saxony.

Samples from the meteorite are held by the Mineralogical Museum of the University of Hamburg and the Max Planck Institute for Chemistry in Mainz.

== See also ==
- Glossary of meteoritics
