= McDonough meteorite =

Meteor event in the south-eastern US

McDonough
- Type: Chondrite
- Class: Ordinary chondrite
- Group: L6
- Country: United States
- Region: Georgia
- Coordinates: 33°23′31.87″N 84°12′25″W
- Observed fall: Yes
- Fall date: 2025-06-26
- TKW: 5.391 kilograms (11.89 lb)
- Strewn field: Yes

On June 26, 2025, a large meteor was observed falling and burning up over the Southeastern United States.

== Event ==
On June 26, 2025, a daytime fireball was reported over the US states of Georgia, Tennessee, and South Carolina. It was widely captured over CCTV cameras and vehicular dash cams. It produced a loud sonic boom that could be heard as far away as Virginia. Several fragments fell through the roofs of buildings in McDonough, Georgia and were collected by researchers from the University of Georgia. Subsequent analysis showed that the meteorite, officially named McDonough, was an L6 chondrite.
