= Qidong (meteorite) =

Meteorite

- Type: Chondrite
- Class: Ordinary chondrite
- Group: L/LL5-an
- Composition: Fa_{25.7}, Fe_{21.5}, Fe-Ni metal abundance 4.7 wt%
- Country: China
- Region: Jiangsu province, Qidong County
- Coordinates: 32°5′N 121°30′E
- Observed fall: Yes
- Fall date: July 2, 1982, 17:45 hrs.
- TKW: 1275 g

Qidong is a L/LL5-an chondrite meteorite fallen in 1982 in China. After detonation a single individual specimen was found in the field. Other circumstances of fall and recovery were not reported.

== Composition and classification ==
This meteorite is intermediate between L and LL ordinary chondrites, possibly indicating formation on a separate parent body. Its fayalite, ferrosilite place this stone at the extreme higher end of L chondrites, the metal content is typical of LL chondrites and the Co abundance in matrix kamacite (15 mg/g) is at the extreme lower end of LL chondrites.

== See also ==
- Glossary of meteoritics
- Meteorite
