= Arroyo Aguiar (meteorite) =

Meteorite found in Santa Fe, Argentina

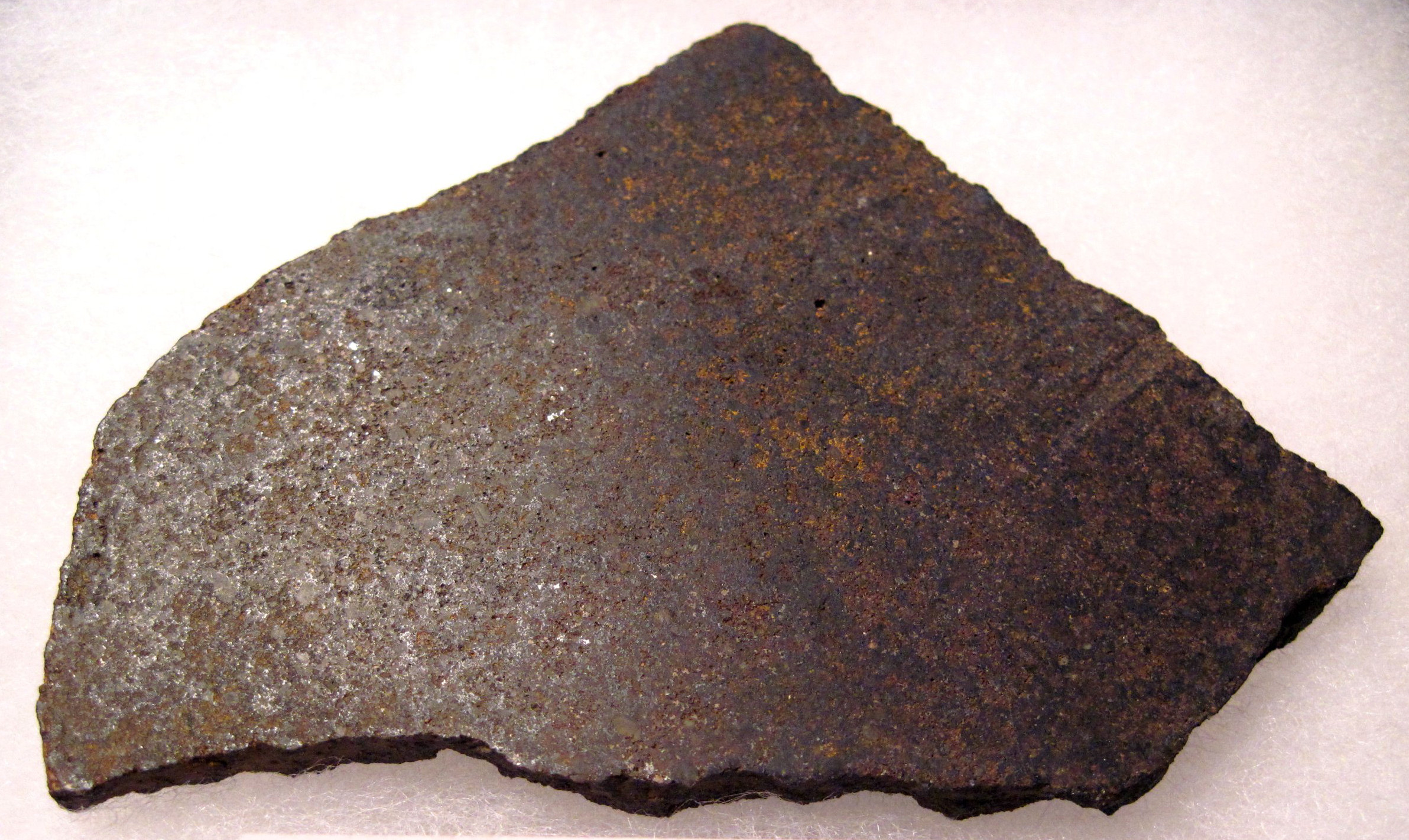
- Type: Chondrite
- Class: Ordinary chondrite
- Group: H5
- Country: Argentina
- Region: Santa Fe
- Coordinates: 31°25′S 60°40′W
- Observed fall: Yes
- Fall date: summer 1950
- TKW: 7.45 kg

Arroyo Aguiar is an H chondrite meteorite that fell to earth during the summer of 1950 in the province of Santa Fe, Argentina.

== Classification ==
It is an ordinary chondrite type H with a petrologic type 5, thus belongs to the group H5.

== See also ==
- Glossary of meteoritics
- Meteorite falls
- Ordinary chondrite
