= Dergaon Meteorite =

Meteorite

Dergaon
- Type: Chondrite
- Class: Ordinary chondrite
- Clan: H chondrite
- Group: H4-5
- Parent body: Asteroid belt
- Composition: Olivine, pyroxene, plagioclase, Fe, Ni, nanodiamonds
- Shock stage: Localized shock-melted features
- Country: India
- Region: Assam
- Observed fall: Yes
- Fall date: 2 March 2001
- Found date: 2 March 2001
- TKW: ~12 kg
- Strewn field: Yes

The Dergaon meteorite fell near the town of Dergaon in Assam, India, on 2 March 2001. The meteorite was named after the location. Researchers have classified this meteorite as an H4-5 ordinary chondrite.

== Fall and recovery ==
On 2 March 2001, at 4:40 PM local time, residents of Dergaon observed a bright fireball in the sky. It exploded twice with a loud noise, accompanied by a slight tremor. Following the event, a local person named H. P. Bordoloi collected a fragment of the meteorite from a pit in a sugarcane field. Multiple fragments of the meteorite (most weighing less than 2 kg, with one large piece weighing approximately 10 kg) were scattered over an area of several square kilometers. The astrophysics team from Gauhati University, under the supervision of Dr. Kalpana Duorah, collected samples and began preliminary research on them.

== Classification ==
Researchers have classified the Dergaon meteorite as an H4-5 ordinary chondrite. H4-5 ordinary chondrites are the most common subtype among ordinary chondrites. H chondrites are known for their high iron content and are typically derived from the asteroid belt. This meteorite has a petrographic grade of 4–5. It also contains localized shock-melted features.

== Petrological and chemical characteristics ==
It is primarily composed of silicate minerals such as olivine, pyroxene, and plagioclase found in the chondrules and matrix. The chondrules of the meteorite exhibit various textures. It was formed in two contrasting environments: one being a hot, dust-rich, and highly oxidized nebular environment, and the other a reducing environment. Using Calibration-Free Laser-Induced Breakdown Spectroscopy (CF-LIBS), researchers confirmed the presence of H, N, O, Na, Mg, Al, Si, P, K, Ca, Ti, Cr, Mn, Fe, Co, Ni, and Ir in the analysis of the meteorite's composition. This analysis determined for the first time the presence and concentration of H, N, and O. Molecular emission of the FeO molecule was also recorded in the meteorite. The Ni/Cr ratio in the meteorite is greater than 1. In the Fourier Transform Infrared (FTIR) spectroscopy analysis, significant absorption bands were found in the 800–1100 cm^{−1} (reciprocal centimeter) range. Researchers stated that these absorption bands were formed due to the valence vibrations of SiO_{4} in the silicate lattice. Raman spectroscopy confirmed the presence of nanodiamonds at 1334–1345 cm^{−1} and 1591–1619 cm^{−1}.

== Age ==
From the cosmogenic noble gas and radionuclide analysis of the Dergaon meteorite, it has been determined that it was exposed to cosmic rays in space for approximately 9.7 million years. The pre-atmospheric size of the meteorite was about 20 centimeters in radius. In olivine grains, the track density of heavy cosmic ray nuclei varies from ~10^{6} cm^{−2} in the largest fragments to (4–9) × 10^{5} cm^{−2} in the smaller fragments.
