= Atoka meteorite =

Meteorite found in the United States

- Type: Chondrite
- Class: Ordinary chondrite
- Group: L6
- Country: United States
- Region: Atoka, Oklahoma
- Coordinates: 34°19′N 96°9′W
- Observed fall: Yes
- Fall date: 1945
- TKW: 1,384 grams (48.8 oz)

The Atoka meteorite is an L6 meteorite which fell to earth near Atoka, Oklahoma, in 1945. It weighs 1,384 grams (48.8 oz).

== See also ==
- Glossary of meteoritics
