= Amphoterite =

Obsolete classification of chondritic meteorites now classified as LL

- — Obsolete classification —
- Compositional type: Stony
- Type: Chondrite

Amphoterite is an obsolete classification of chondritic meteorites that are now classified as LL (Low Iron and Low total metal content) types.

Most of the iron in these types of meteorites is present as ironoxide in the minerals (e.g. olivine) rather than as free metal, as it is found in most other meteorites. Free metallic iron amounts to between 0.3% and 3.0% of the meteorite, and with a total iron content of 20% give or take a couple of percentage points.

There will be a number after the LL in a meteorites classification type, e.g. LL3, LL5, LL6. (Types range from 3 to 7) The number indicates the amount of alteration suffered by the chondrules in the meteorite.

A chondrule is a small mineral ball generally 0.1–4 millimetres (0.0039–0.1575 in) in diameter. An LL3 type is pristine with perfectly discernible chondrules, an LL7 type has been melted or altered by pressure or other force to almost completely obliterate the round chondrules.

== Sources ==
- Astrodigital Online Dictionary of Meteoritics

== See also ==
- Glossary of meteoritics
