= Atoka =

Atoka may refer to:

- Atoka County, Choctaw Nation
- Atoka, New Mexico
- Atoka, Oklahoma
- Atoka County, Oklahoma
- Atoka, Tennessee
- Atoka, Virginia
- Atoka (meteorite)
