= Weston meteorite =

Meteorite that fell in Connecticut, USA in 1807

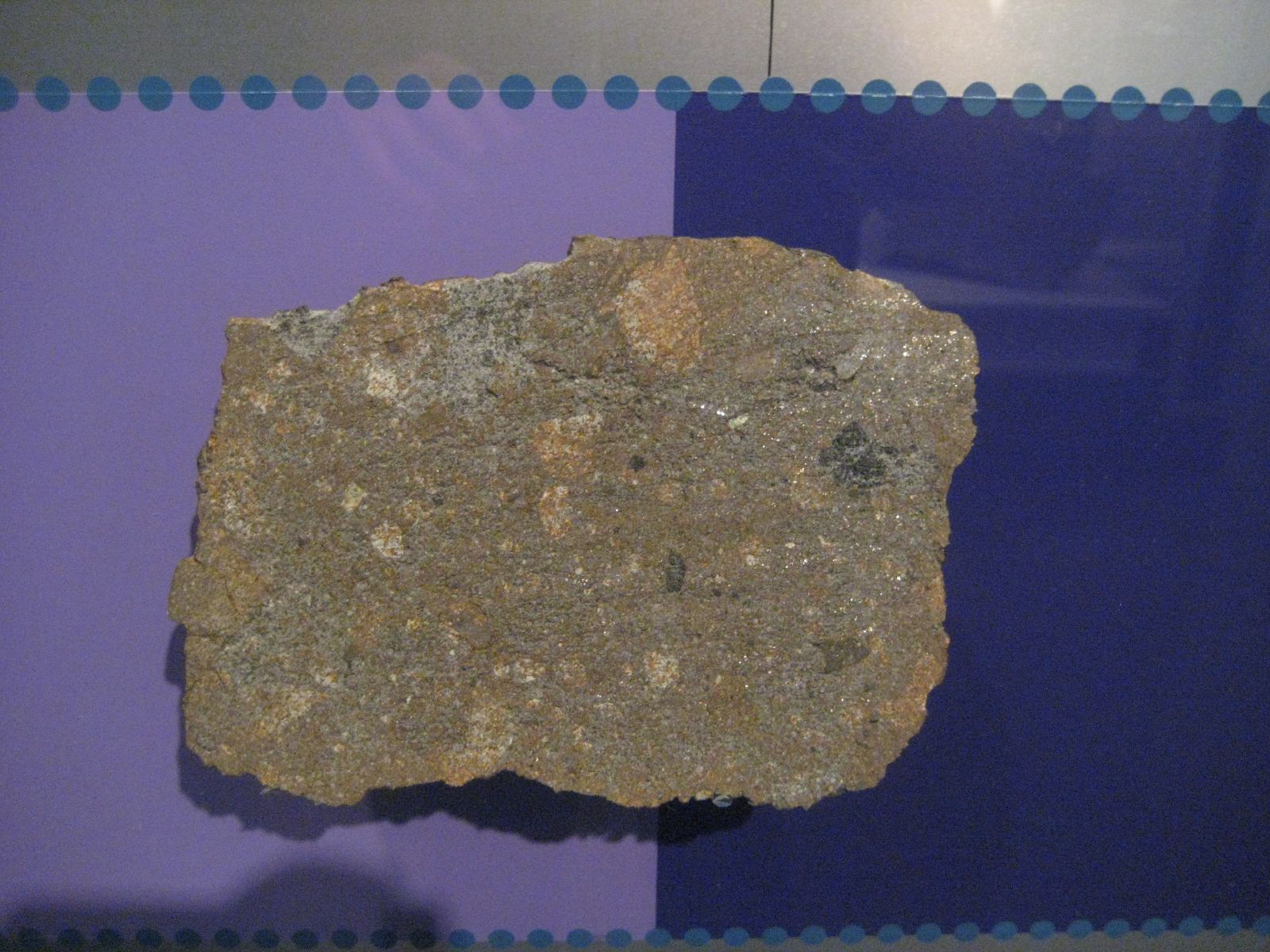
- Weston meteorite, H4
- Type: Ordinary Chondrite
- Class: H4
- Weathering grade: W0
- Country: United States
- Region: Fairfield County, Connecticut
- Coordinates: 41°13′N 73°23′W
- Observed fall: Yes
- Fall date: 14 December 1807
- Related media on Wikimedia Commons

The Weston meteorite is an H4 ordinary chondrite meteorite which fell to earth above the town of Weston, Connecticut on the morning of December 14, 1807.

== History ==
The Weston meteorite fell to earth above the town of Weston, Connecticut at approximately 6:30 in the morning on December 14, 1807. The meteor fall was widely witnessed and reported in newspaper accounts at the time. Eyewitnesses reported three loud explosions with stone fragments falling in at least six locations.

== Debris field and naming ==
The majority of the meteorite's debris field is located in and around the Easton Reservoir in the town of Easton, Connecticut. In 1807 this area of Easton, Connecticut was within Weston, Connecticut. The remaining part of the debris field extended into the western part of neighboring Trumbull, Connecticut. Several fragments of this meteorite were collected in the Tashua section of Trumbull, Connecticut, in and around what is now Sturbridge Lane and Tashua Knolls.

== Historical and scientific significance ==
Fragments from the fall were collected, documented, and chemically analyzed by Yale University professors Benjamin Silliman and James Luce Kingsley. The Weston meteorite is the first meteorite to fall in the New World which was documented in such a manner, marking the beginning of meteorite science in the United States. Fragments of the meteorite remain within the Yale meteorite collection, which is the oldest such collection in the United States.

The meteorite was also written about, at the time, by Nathaniel Bowditch, calculating the size and trajectory of the meteor.

== See also ==
- Glossary of meteoritics
