= Qidong =

Qidong may refer to:

- Qidong, Jiangsu (启东市), formerly Qidong County, county-level city of Nantong, Jiangsu
  - Qidong (meteorite), a meteorite that fell in Qidong, Jiangsu in 1982
- Qidong County (祁东县), of Hengyang, Hunan
