= Jodzie =

Meteorite found in Lithuania

- Type: Achondrite
- Class: Asteroidal achondrite
- Clan: HED meteorite
- Group: Howardite
- Country: Lithuania
- Region: Panevėžys District Municipality
- Coordinates: 55°27′6″N 24°20′44″E
- Observed fall: Yes
- Fall date: 17 June 1877
- TKW: 51.5 grams (1.82 oz)
- Alternative names: Yodze, Juodžiai

Jodzie is a meteorite that fell on 17 June 1877 near the village of Juodžiai near Panevėžys (then located in Kovno Governorate, Russian Empire, now in Lithuania). It is a relatively rare howardite with some carbonaceous inclusions that were likely a result of an asteroid collision. Therefore, despite its small size, it has been a subject of several scientific studies.

== History ==
The meteorite was obtained by Julian Simashko, a Russian zoologist and entomologist interested in meteorites. After the death of Simashko, his heirs sold the meteorite collection (about 400 specimens) to Henry Augustus Ward for 30,000 gold rubles. This collection, including the main fragment of Jodzie meteorite weighing 48 grams (1.7 oz), was obtained by the Field Museum of Natural History. Fragments of the meteorite are held by several museums: 17.9 grams (0.63 oz) by the Field Museum of Natural History in Chicago, 4.6 grams (0.16 oz) by the Russian Academy of Sciences, 1.5 grams (0.053 oz) by the Natural History Museum in London, 1 gram (0.035 oz) fragments by the National Museum of Natural History in Paris and Natural History Museum in Vienna, 0.5 grams (0.018 oz) by the Natural History Museum in Berlin, 0.2 grams (0.0071 oz) by the National Museum of Natural History in Washington. The fate of other fragments is unknown.

== Analysis ==
Jodzie is classified as a howardite. As other gas-rich meteorites, it consists of light parts mixed with darker material that contains a large amounts of primordial rare gases. The light part (Eucritic or basaltic material) is primarily composed of sodium, calcium, aluminosilicate. The dark part (Diogenitic material) is primarily composed of pyroxene, magnesium, iron, and aluminosilicate. Further, Jodzie has several clasts of ferrogabbro and is composed (about 8% of volume) of small CM and CR carbonaceous chondrite-like inclusions, which are not typically found in HED meteorites. Thus, despite its small size, Jodzie displays a great variety of minerals. Studies identified the presence of 25 different minerals, including enstatite, ferrosilite, serpentine group, barringerite, diopside, fayalite, ferrosilite, magnetite, pentlandite, pyrrhotite. Analysis of the noble gases revealed that Jodzie has all five noble gases and is similar to the Kapoeta meteorite (fell in 1942 in South Sudan) except that Jodzie has significantly more of helium-3 and neon-21 isotopes. The inclusions of carbonaceous material and the abundance of primordial gases were likely a result of a low-velocity collision between asteroids – an object (asteroid or comet) bombarded by the solar wind brought carbonaceous material and the gases to the host and the materials mixed during the impact.
