= Meteorite fall statistics =

Statistics used to find the amount of meteorites

Meteorite fall statistics are frequently used by planetary scientists to approximate the true flux of meteorites on Earth. Meteorite falls are those meteorites that are collected soon after being witnessed to fall, whereas meteorite finds are discovered at a later time. Although there are 30 times as much finds than falls, their raw distribution of types does not accurately reflect what falls to Earth. The reasons for this include the following:

- Some meteorite types are easier to find than others.
- Some meteorite types are degraded by weathering more quickly than others.
- Some meteorites, especially iron meteorites, may have been collected by people in the past who recognized them as being unusual and/or useful, thereby removing them from the scientific record.
- Many meteorites fall as showers of many stones, but when they are collected long after the event it may be difficult to tell which ones were part of the same fall.
- Many meteorites are found by people who sell meteorites... valuable, rare types become known to science quickly, while those of low value may never be described.

There have been many attempts to correct statistical analyses of meteorite finds for some of these effects, especially to estimate the frequency with which rare meteorite types fall. For example, there are over 100 known lunar meteorite finds, but none has ever been observed to fall. However, for abundant types, meteorite fall statistics are generally preferred.

These statistics are current through June 9, 2012.

== Statistics by material ==
For most meteorite falls, even those that occurred long ago or for which material has never received complete scientific characterization, it is known whether the object was a stone, stony iron, or iron meteorite. Here are the numbers and percentages of each type, based on literature data.

Material	Number	%
Iron meteorites	49	2%
Stony-iron meteorites	11	1.0%
Stony meteorites	1042	94.6%
Total	1102	100.0%

== Statistics by major category ==
The traditional way of subdividing meteorites (see Meteorites classification) is into irons, stony-irons, and two major groups of stony meteorites, chondrites and achondrites. For some of the less-studied stony meteorite falls, it is not known whether the object is chondritic; thus the number of meteorites that can be so grouped is 4% lower than shown above. These numbers are shown in the next table. One could make a slight correction for the undercounting of stony meteorites (e.g., the percentage of irons would decrease by a 0.2%), but this was not done.

Category	Number	%
Irons	49	4.6%
Stony irons	11	1.0%
Achondrites	86	8.2%
Chondrites	915	86.2%
Total	1062	100.0%

== Statistics by meteorite group ==
Probably the most useful statistical breakdown of meteorite falls is by group, which is the fundamental way that meteorites are classified. About 5% of the meteorites in the table just above have not been sufficiently classified to allow them to be put into such groups. Again, a small adjustment could be made to the percentages to correct for this effect, but it does not greatly change the results. Note that a number of meteorite groups are only represented by a small number of falls; the percentages of falls belonging to these groups have a large uncertainty.

Group	N	%
Iron meteorites
IAB complex	10	1.0%
IC	0	0.0%
IIAB	6	0.6%
IIC	0	0.0%
IID	3	0.3%
IIE	2	0.2%
IIF	1	0.1%
IIG	0	0.0%
IIIAB	11	1.1%
IIIE	0	0.0%
IIIF	0	0.0%
IVA	4	0.4%
IVB	0	0.0%
Ungrouped	4	0.4%
Stony Iron meteorites
Mesosiderite	7	0.7%
Pallasite	4	0.4%

Group	N	%
Achondrites
Acapulcoite	1	0.1%
Lodranite	1	0.1%
Angrite	1	0.1%
Aubrite	9	0.9%
Diogenite	11	1.2%
Eucrite	34	3.4%
Howardite	16	1.6%
Brachinite	0	0.0%
Ureilite	6	0.6%
Winonaite	1	0.1%
Ungrouped	2	0.2%
Lunar	0	0.0%
Martian	5	0.5%

Group	N	%	Class total
Chondrites
CB	1	0.1%	Carbonaceous: 4.4%
CH	0	0.0%	Carbonaceous: 4.4%
CI	5	0.5%	Carbonaceous: 4.4%
CK	2	0.2%	Carbonaceous: 4.4%
CM	15	1.5%	Carbonaceous: 4.4%
CO	6	0.6%	Carbonaceous: 4.4%
CR	2	0.2%	Carbonaceous: 4.4%
CV	7	0.7%	Carbonaceous: 4.4%
C ungrouped	6	0.6%	Carbonaceous: 4.4%
EH	8	0.8%	Enstatite: 1.6%
EL	8	0.8%	Enstatite: 1.6%
H	339	33.8%	Ordinary: 80.0%
H/L	1	0.1%	Ordinary: 80.0%
L	371	37.0%	Ordinary: 80.0%
L/LL	9	0.9%	Ordinary: 80.0%
LL	82	8.2%	Ordinary: 80.0%
R	1	0.1%	Other: 0.2%
K	1	0.1%	Other: 0.2%

Grand Total: 1003 meteorites

== Statistics by country ==
Country	N
Afghanistan	2
Algeria	7
Angola	3
Argentina	24
Armenia	2
Australia	16
Austria	4
Azerbaijan	2
Bangladesh	8
Belarus	3
Belgium	3
Bosnia and Herzegovina	1
Brazil	22
Bulgaria	6
Burkina Faso	8
Burma	3
Cambodia	2
Cameroon	3
Canada	16
Central African Republic	1
Chad	1
Chile	1
People's Republic of China	58
Colombia	1
Costa Rica	1
Croatia	4
Czech Republic	15

Country	N
DR Congo	5
Denmark	4
Ecuador	1
Egypt	2
Estonia	3
Ethiopia	5
Finland	5
France	63
Germany	32
Ghana	1
Greece	1
Hungary	6
India	127
Indonesia	16
Iran	2
Iraq	2
Ireland	6
Italy	31
Japan	42
Jordan	1
Kazakhstan	6
Kenya	4
Latvia	4
Lebanon	1
Lesotho	1
Libya	1
Lithuania	4
Madagascar	1

Country	N
Malawi	5
Mali	2
Mauritania	3
Mauritius	1
Mexico	19
Mongolia	4
Morocco	6
Namibia	2
Netherlands	4
New Caledonia	1
New Zealand	1
Niger	9
Nigeria	14
Norway	9
Pakistan	15
Papua New Guinea	2
Paraguay	1
Peru	1
Philippines	4
Poland	11
Portugal	6
Romania	7
Russia	47
Rwanda	1
Saudi Arabia	4
Serbia	4
Slovakia	3

Country	N
Slovenia	5
Somalia	2
South Africa	21
South Korea	3
South Sudan	3
Spain	23
Sri Lanka	1
Sudan	7
Swaziland	1
Sweden	9
Switzerland	4
Syria	1
Tanzania	8
Thailand	3
Tunisia	5
Turkey	12
Turkmenistan	2
Uganda	5
Ukraine	32
United Kingdom	18
United States	146
Uzbekistan	2
Venezuela	2
Vietnam	3
Western Sahara (Note: Western Sahara is not widely recognized a country. It is a disputed territory in the Maghreb region of North Africa, partially controlled by the self-proclaimed Sahrawi Arab Democratic Republic and partially Moroccan-occupied.)	3
Yemen	2
Zambia	1
Zimbabwe	2

Grand Total: 1106 meteorites

== Statistics by continent and time ==
Epoch	Europe	Asia	North America	Africa	South America	Oceania	Total
Pre-1400	1	1					2
1400s	4						4
1500s	2						2
1600s	9	3					12
1700s	25	3					28
1800–1820	31	7	3	1			42
1821–1840	26	11	9	1	1		48
1841–1860	42	15	12	1			70
1861–1880	47	36	14	6	4	1	108
1881–1900	36	27	20	7		2	92
1901–1920	27	55	21	10	4	2	119
1921–1940	38	55	32	17	14	5	161
1941–1960	27	27	18	31	12	3	118
1961–1980	19	42	22	29	8	3	123
1981–2000	12	49	19	24	4	2	110
2001-	11	15	12	16	7	2	63
Total	357	346	121	144	53	20	1102

== See also ==
- Glossary of meteoritics
