= LL chondrite =

Group of chondrites with low iron and low metal content

- — Group —
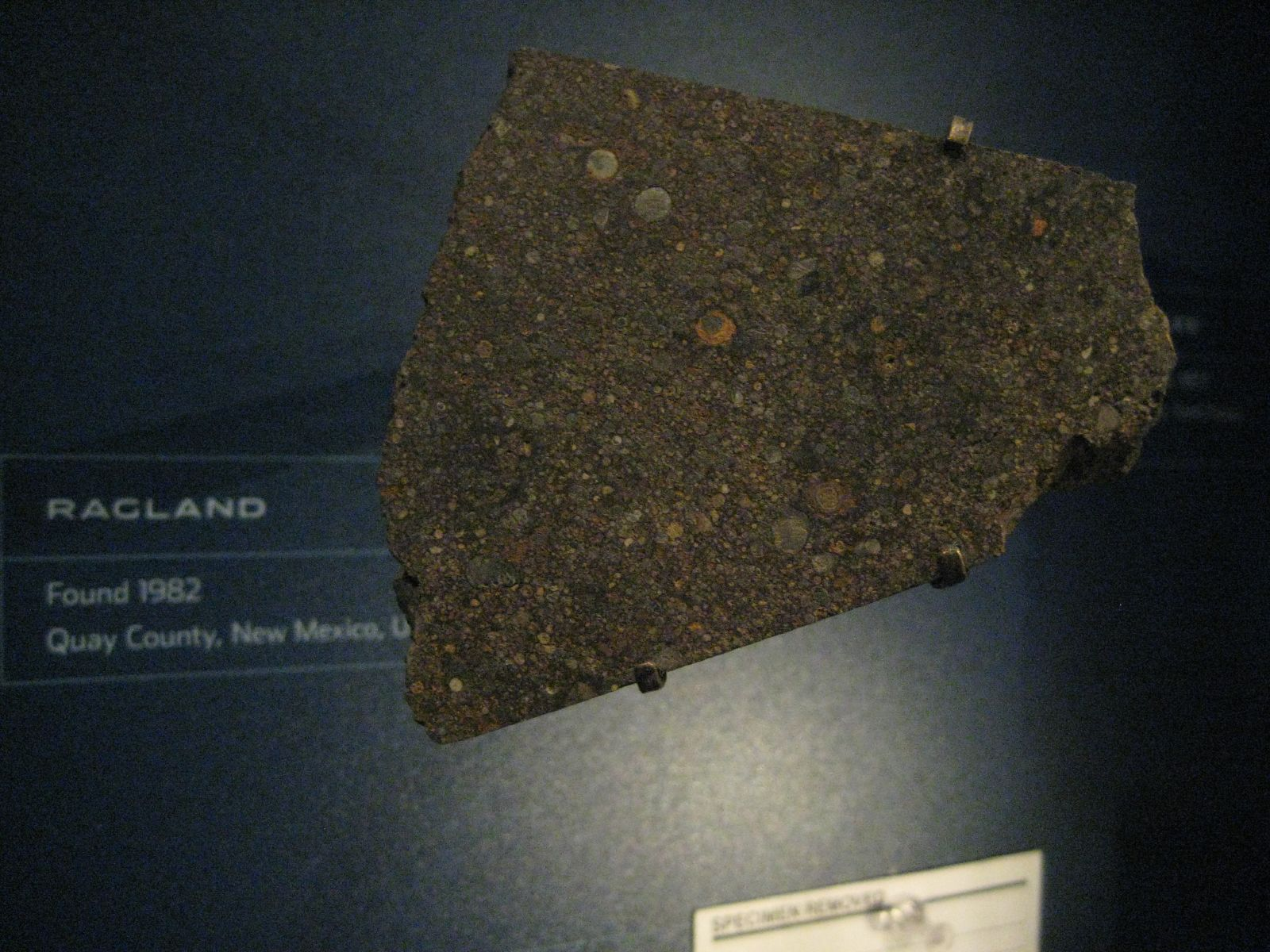
- Ragland meteorite, an LL3.4
- Type: Chondrite
- Structural classification: ?
- Class: Ordinary chondrite
- Subgroups: LL3.4; LL5; LL6; etc
- Parent body: Unknown
- Composition: Iron 19–22% (metallic iron (Fe) 0.3–3%, iron oxide (FeO) the rest), olivine(characteristic fayalite (Fa) 26 to 32 mol%), hypersthene (a pyroxene), Fe–Ni, troilite (FeS), feldspar or feldspathic glass, chromite, phosphates.
- Petrologic type: Mostly 5 & 6
- Alternative names: LL chondrites, LL chondrite meteorites, Amphoterites

The LL chondrites are a group of stony meteorites, the least abundant group of the ordinary chondrites, accounting for about 10–11% of observed ordinary-chondrite falls and 8–9% of all meteorite falls (see meteorite fall statistics). The ordinary chondrites are thought to have originated from three parent asteroids, with the fragments making up the H chondrite, L chondrite and LL chondrite groups respectively. The composition of the Chelyabinsk meteorite is that of a LL chondrite meteorite. The material makeup of Itokawa, the asteroid visited by the Hayabusa spacecraft which landed on it and brought particles back to Earth also proved to be type LL chondrite.

== Name ==
LL stands for Low (total) iron, Low metal.

== Chemical composition ==
They contain 19–22% total iron and only 0.3–3% metallic iron. That means that most of the iron is present as iron oxide (FeO) in the silicates; olivine contains 26 to 32 mol% fayalite (Fa). The most abundant minerals are hypersthene (a pyroxene) and olivine. Other minerals include Fe–Ni, troilite (FeS), feldspar or feldspathic glass, chromite, and phosphates.

== Structural composition ==
LL chondrites contain the largest chondrules of the ordinary chondrite groups, averaging around 1 millimetre (0.039 in) diameter.

The LL group includes many of the most primitive ordinary chondrites, including the well-studied Semarkona (type 3.0) chondrite. However, most LL chondrites have been thermally metamorphosed to petrologic types 5 and 6, meaning that their minerals are homogeneous in composition and chondrule borders are difficult to discern.

This, together with the low content of metal, led the 19th century mineralogist Tschermak to determine that they formed a transitional stage between chondrites and achondrites and to name them amphoterites. We know now that LL chondrites and achondrites are quite different, so this name is no longer in use.

Many of the LL chondrites are breccias.

== See also ==
- Glossary of meteoritics
- S-type asteroid

== Bibliography ==
- Heide, Fritz; Wlotzka, F. (1995). Meteorites: messengers from space. Springer-Verlag. doi:10.1007/978-3-642-57786-4. ISBN 978-3-540-58105-5.
