= H chondrite =

Type of meteorite

- — Group —
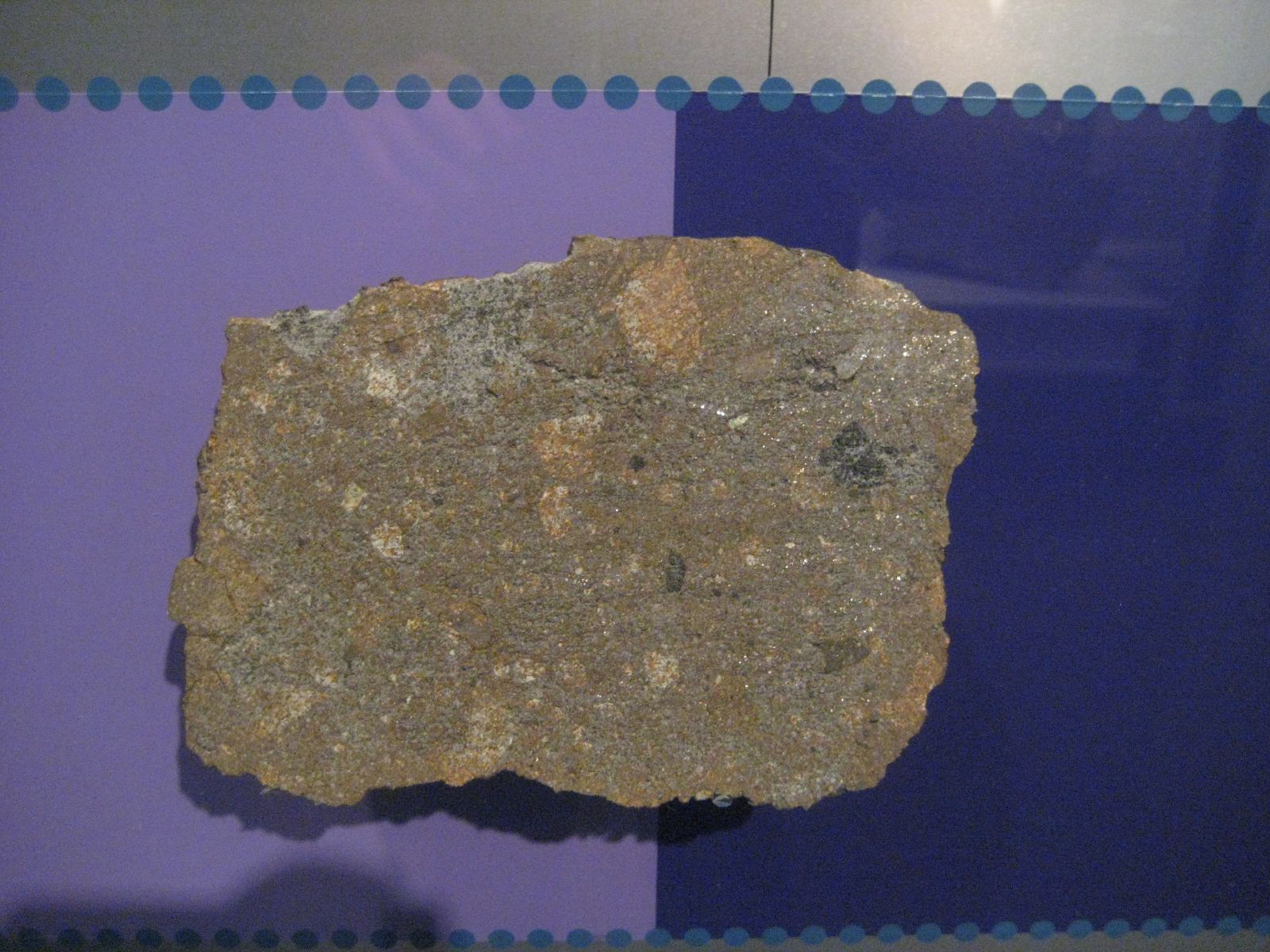
- Weston meteorite, H4
- Type: Chondrite
- Structural classification: ?
- Class: Ordinary chondrite
- Subgroups: H3; H4; H5
- Parent body: Possibly 6 Hebe, less likely 3 Juno & 7 Iris
- Composition: Iron ~25–31%, bronzite (an orthopyroxene), olivine (with characteristic fayalite (Fa) content 16 to 20 mol%), nickel-iron 15–19%, troilite 5%
- Petrologic type: 3 (~2.5%), 5 (40%), 4 & 6 (57.5%)
- Alternative names: Bronzite chondrites, Olivine bronzite chondrites
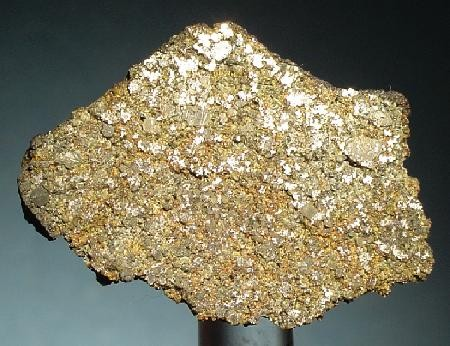
- Nuevo Mercurio, H5

The H type ordinary chondrites are the most common type of meteorite, accounting for approximately 40% of all those catalogued, 46% of the ordinary chondrites, and 44% of all chondrites. The ordinary chondrites are thought to have originated from three parent asteroids, whose fragments make up the H chondrite, L chondrite and LL chondrite groups respectively.

== Name ==
The name comes from their High iron abundance, with respect to other ordinary chondrites.

Historically, the H chondrites have been named bronzite chondrites or olivine bronzite chondrites for the dominant minerals, but these terms are now obsolete.

== Parent body ==
A probable parent body for this group is the S-type asteroid 6 Hebe, with less likely candidates being 3 Juno and 7 Iris. It is supposed that these meteorites arise from impacts onto small near-Earth asteroids broken off from 6 Hebe in the past, rather than originating from 6 Hebe directly.

The H chondrites have very similar trace element abundances and Oxygen isotope ratios to the IIE iron meteorites, making it likely that they both originate from the same parent body.

== Iron ==
Their high iron abundance is about 25–31% by weight. Over half of this is present in metallic form, making these meteorites strongly magnetic despite the stony chondritic appearance.

== Mineralogy ==
The most abundant minerals are bronzite (an orthopyroxene), and olivine. Characteristic is the fayalite (Fa) content of the olivine of 16 to 20 mol%. They contain also 15–19% of nickel-iron metal and about 5% of troilite. The majority of these meteorites have been significantly metamorphosed, with over 40% being in petrologic class 5, most of the rest in classes 4 and 6. Only a few (about 2.5%) are of the largely unaltered petrologic class 3.

== Gallery ==
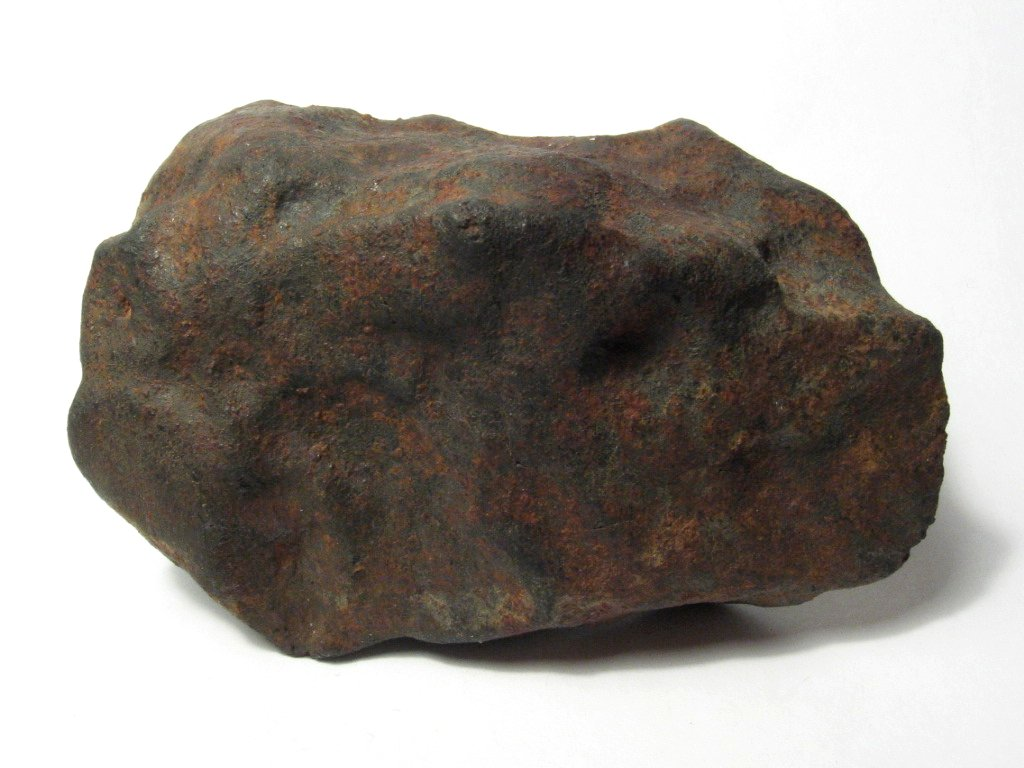
Gao-Guenie, H5

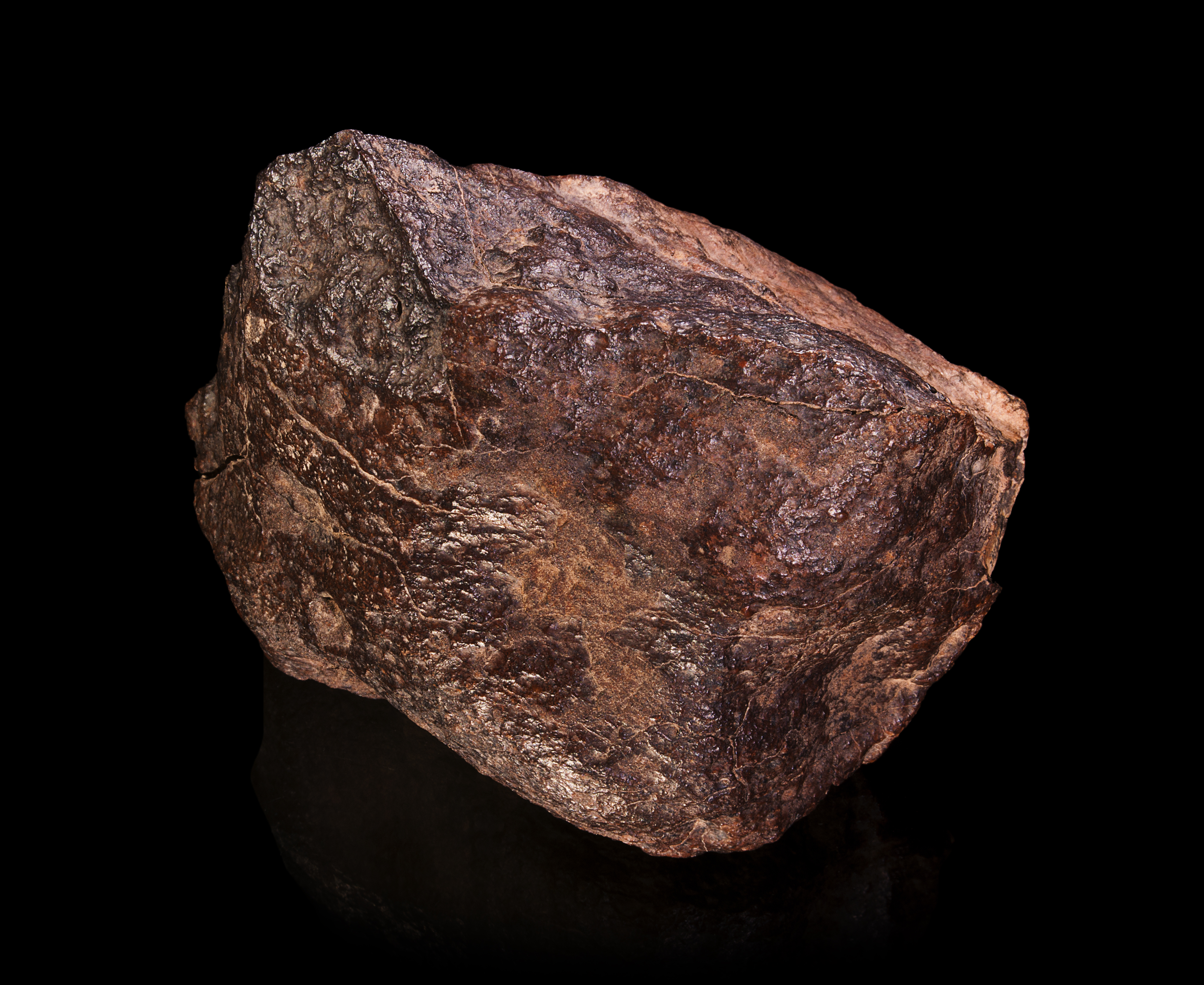
H5 Dar Bou Nali South Morocco

== See also ==
- Glossary of meteoritics
