= L chondrite =

Type of meteorite

- — Group —
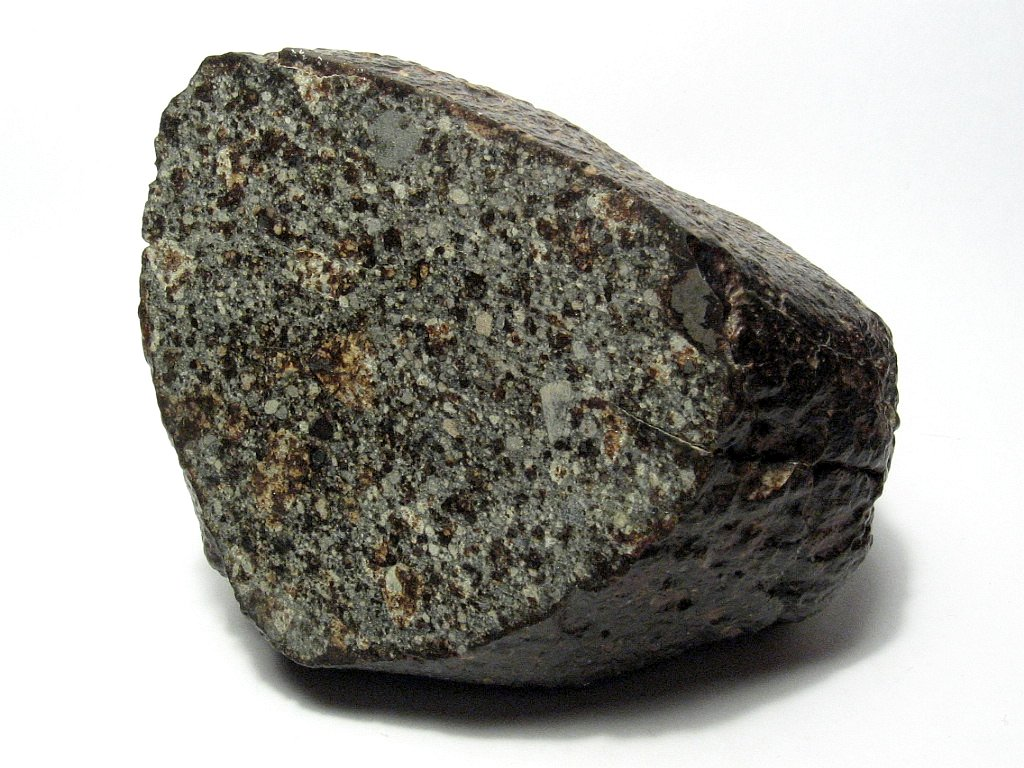
- NWA 869, an L3-6 brecciated chondrite
- Type: Chondrite
- Structural classification: ?
- Class: Ordinary chondrite
- Subgroups: L3 - L7; etc
- Parent body: Possibly 433 Eros, Flora family, or the Massalia family as a whole
- Composition: Olivine (characteristic fayalite (Fa) of 21 to 25 mol%), hypersthene (an orthopyroxene), iron–nickel 4–10%, troilite, chromite, Na-rich feldspar, Ca-phosphates
- Petrologic type: 3 - 7
- Alternative names: L chondrite meteorites, Hypersthene chondrites, Olivine hypersthene chondrites
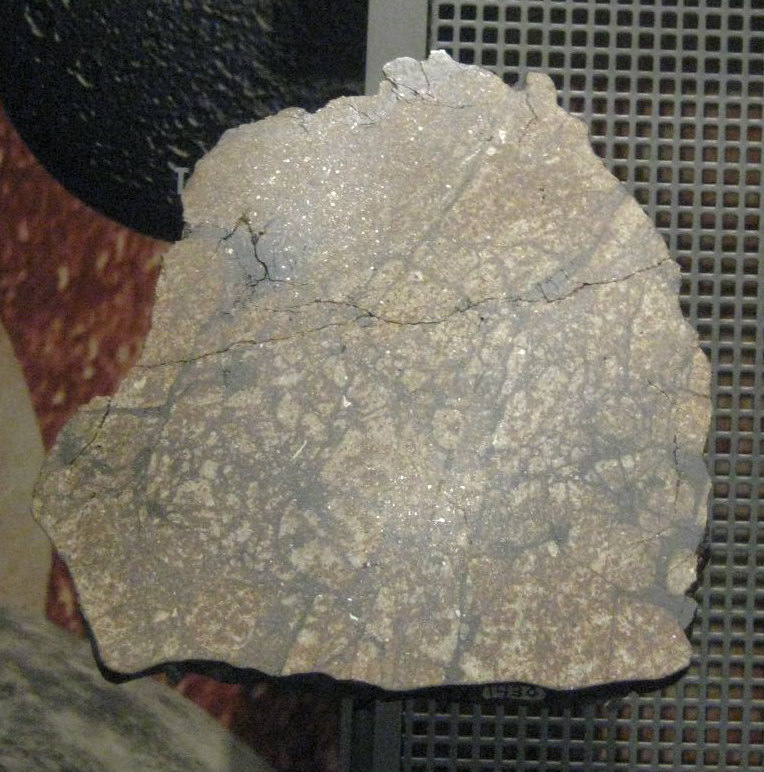
- Walters, an L6 chondrite

The L type ordinary chondrites are the second most common group of meteorites, accounting for approximately 35% of all those catalogued, and 40% of the ordinary chondrites. The ordinary chondrites are thought to have originated from three parent asteroids, with the fragments making up the H chondrite, L chondrite and LL chondrite groups respectively.

== Name ==
Their name comes from their relatively low iron abundance (less than 10%) with respect to the H chondrites, which are about 20–25% iron by weight.

Historically, the L chondrites have been named hypersthene chondrites or olivine hypersthene chondrites for the dominant minerals, but these terms are now obsolete.

== Chemical composition ==
Characteristic is the fayalite content (Fa) in olivine of 21 to 25 mol%. About 4–10% iron–nickel is found as a free metal, making these meteorites magnetic, but not as strongly as the H chondrites.

== Mineralogy ==
The most abundant minerals are olivine and hypersthene (an orthopyroxene), as well as iron–nickel and troilite. Chromite, sodium-rich feldspar and calcium phosphates occur in minor amounts. Petrologic type 6 dominates, with over 60% of the L chondrites falling into this class. This indicates that the parent body was sizeable enough (greater than 100 kilometres (62 mi) in diameter) to experience strong heating.

== Ordovician meteor event ==
Many of the L chondrite meteorites may have their origin in the Ordovician meteor event, radioisotope dated with the uranium-lead method at around 467.50±0.28 million years ago. Compared to other chondrites, a large proportion of the L chondrites have been heavily shocked, which is taken to imply that the parent body was catastrophically disrupted by a large impact.

== Parent body ==
The parent body/bodies for this group are not known, but plausible suggestions include 433 Eros and 8 Flora, or the Flora family as a whole. 433 Eros has been found to have a similar spectrum, while several pieces of circumstantial evidence for the Flora family exist: (1) the Flora family is thought to have formed about 1,000 to 500 million years ago; (2) the Flora family lies in a region of the asteroid belt that contributes strongly to the meteorite flux at Earth; (3) the Flora family consists of S-type asteroids, whose composition is similar to that of chondrite meteorites; and (4) the Flora family parent body was over 100 kilometres (62 mi) in diameter.

The Massalia family is also a possible source of these meteorites.

It is known that one of the parent bodies of the L chondrites had a large breakup due to an impactor striking it around 467ma, sending shards of it to the inner solar system and leading to the Ordovician meteor event. This impact has been dated via cosmic ray exposure at around 468.0±0.3 million years ago. Earlier argon dating placed the event at around 470±6 million years ago.

== See also ==
- Glossary of meteoritics
