= Ordinary chondrite =

Class of stony meteorites

- — Class —
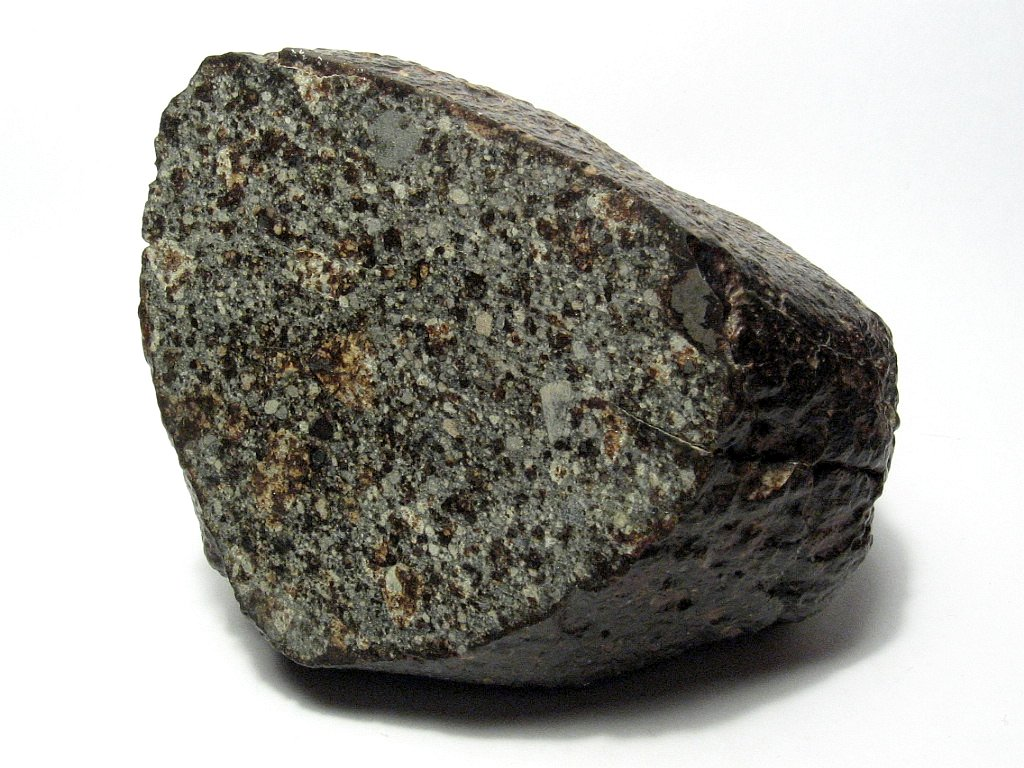
- Ordinary chondrite NWA 869
- Compositional type: Stony
- Type: Chondrite
- Parent body: Multiple, most probably 6 Hebe (H chondrites), the Massalia Asteroid Family (L chondrites), and 25143 Itokawa (LL chondrites)
- Petrologic type: 3-7
- Alternative names: O chondrites

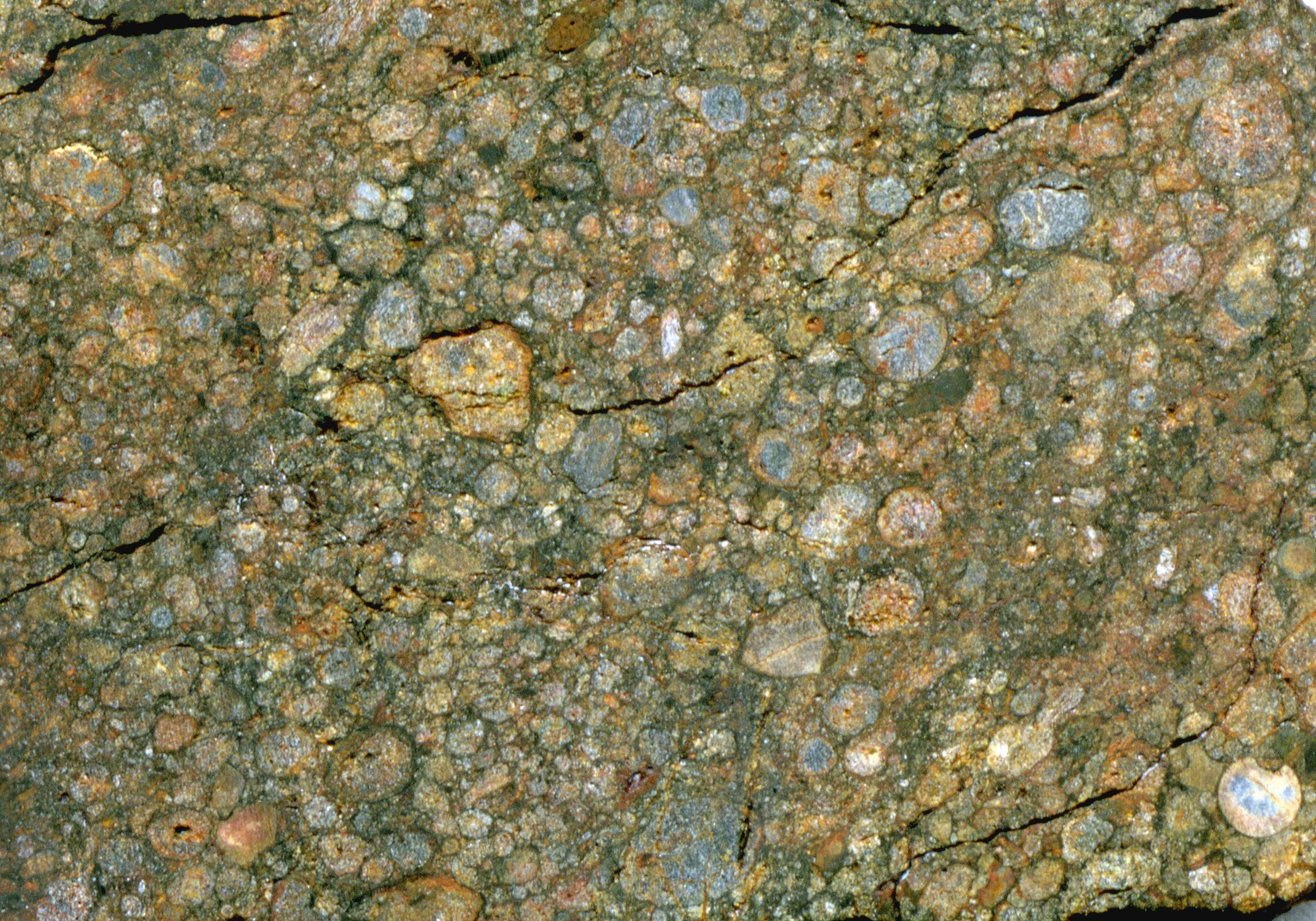
Ordinary chondrite NWA 3189 sliced. Field of view c. 2.2 cm across. NWA 3189 has been classified as an LL3.2–3.4 ordinary chondrite ("LL" means very low total iron content; "3" refers to well-preserved chondrules – the rock has not been subjected to metamorphism intense enough to disrupt the chondritic texture). This chondrite has a multicolored mix of chondrules of varying size and shape.

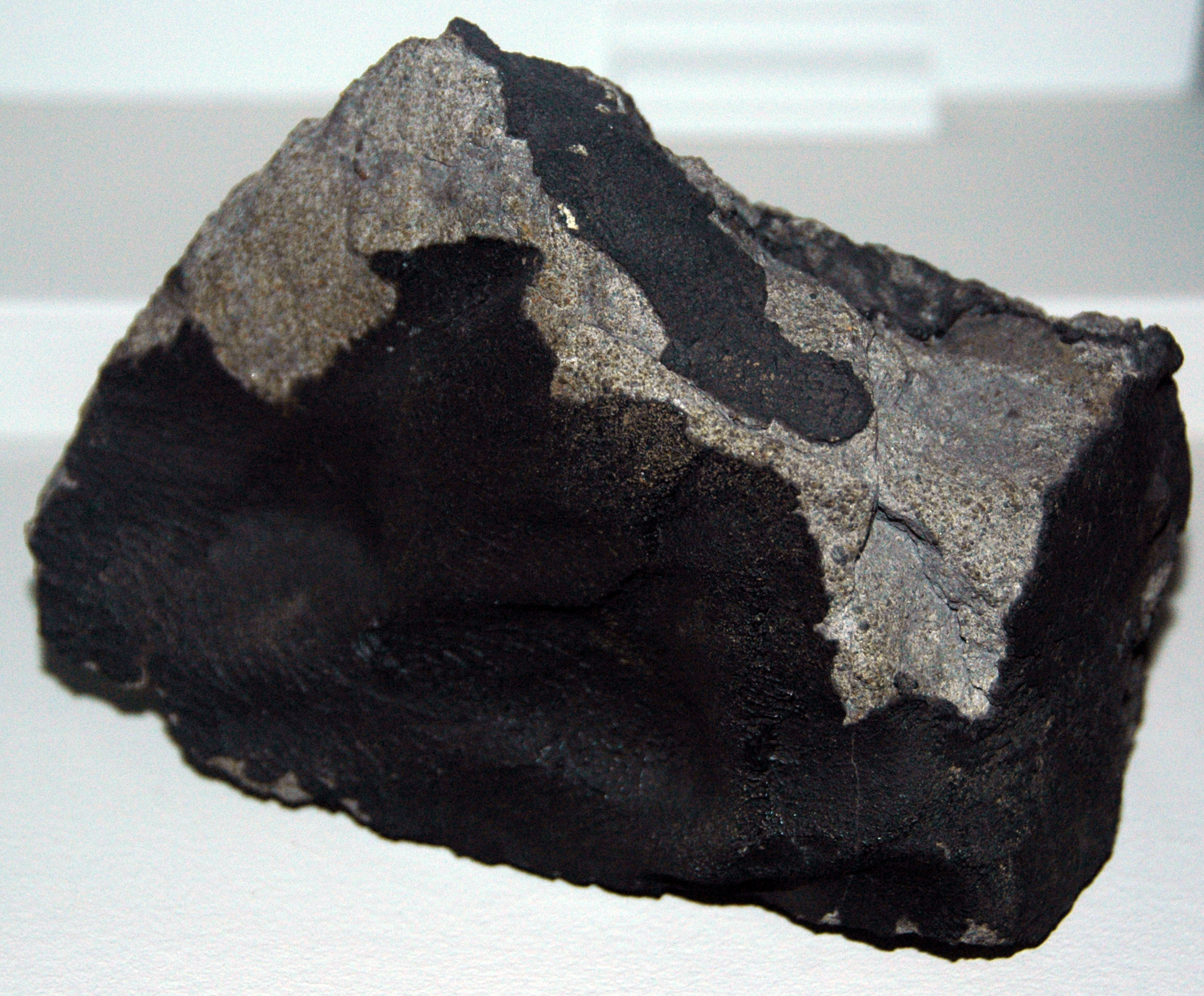
Ochansk Meteorite, an ordinary chondrite with a fusion crust, found in 1887 in Russia.

The ordinary chondrites (sometimes called the O chondrites) are a class of stony chondritic meteorites. They are by far the most numerous group, comprising 87% of all finds. Hence, they have been dubbed "ordinary". The ordinary chondrites are thought to have originated from three parent asteroids, with the fragments making up the H chondrite, L chondrite and LL chondrite groups respectively.

== Origin ==
It is suspected that they are not representative of typical asteroid parent bodies, but rather of a select few which are advantageously placed to send impact fragments to Earth-crossing orbits. Such positions are e.g. near Kirkwood gaps and/or secular resonances in the main asteroid belt. In fact, only the one rather insignificant asteroid 3628 Božněmcová has been identified to have a spectrum close to the ordinary chondrites.

A probable parent body of the H chondrites (comprising about 46% of the ordinary chondrites) is 6 Hebe, but its spectrum is dissimilar due to what is likely a metal impact melt component.

It is likely that the ordinary chondrites comprise a detailed sample of but a few select asteroids which happen to have been in the right place at the right time to send many fragments toward Earth at the present moment in solar system history. On the other hand, observations of 243 Ida by the Galileo spacecraft found weathering of Ida's surface, and the reflection spectra of freshly exposed parts of the surface resembled that of OC meteorites, while the older regions matched the spectra of common S-type asteroids.

== Chemical composition ==
The ordinary chondrites comprise three mineralogically and chemically distinct groupings. They differ in the amount of total iron, of iron metal and iron oxide in the silicates:

- The H chondrites have the Highest total iron, high metal, but lower iron oxide (Fa) in the silicates
- The L chondrites have Lower total iron, lower metal, but higher iron oxide (Fa) in the silicates
- The LL chondrites have Low total iron and Low metal, but the highest iron oxide content (Fa) in the silicates

== See also ==
- Glossary of meteoritics
- Chondrite
- Chondrule
