= Chondrite =

Class of stony meteorites made of round grains

- — Type —
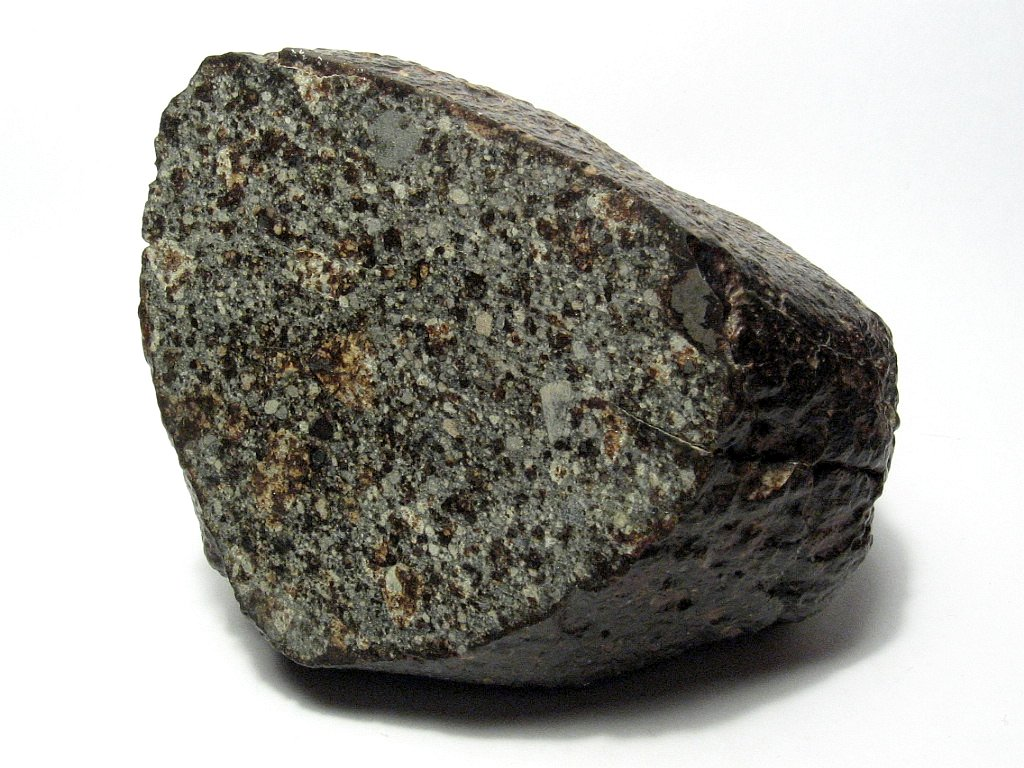
- A specimen of the NWA 869 chondrite (type L3–6), showing chondrules and metal flakes
- Compositional type: Stony
- Parent body: Small to medium asteroids that were never part of a body large enough to undergo melting and planetary differentiation.
- Petrologic type: 3–7
- Total known specimens: Over 27,000

A chondrite (/ˈkɒn.draɪt/, CON-drite) is a stony (non-metallic) meteorite that has not been modified by either melting or differentiation of the parent body. (Note: The use of the term non-metallic does not imply the total absence of metals.) They are formed when various types of dust and small grains in the early Solar System accreted to form primitive asteroids. Some such bodies that are captured in the planet's gravity well become the most common type of meteorite by arriving on a trajectory toward the planet's surface. Estimates for their contribution to the total meteorite population vary between 85.7% and 86.2%.

Their study provides important clues for understanding the origin and age of the Solar System, the synthesis of organic compounds, and the origin of life and the presence of water on Earth. One of their characteristics is the presence of chondrules (from the Ancient Greek χόνδρος chondros, grain), which are round grains formed in space as molten or partially molten droplets of distinct minerals. Chondrules typically constitute between 20% and 80% of a chondrite by volume.

Chondrites can be distinguished from iron meteorites by their low iron and nickel content. Non-metallic meteorites that lack chondrules are achondrites, which are believed to have formed more recently than chondrites. There are currently over 27,000 chondrites in the world's collections. The largest individual stone ever recovered, weighing 1770 kg, was part of the Jilin meteorite shower of 1976. Chondrite falls range from single stones to extraordinary showers consisting of thousands of individual stones. An instance of the latter occurred in the Holbrook fall of 1912, in which an estimated 14,000 stones were grounded in northern Arizona.

== Origin and history ==
Chondrites were formed by the accretion of particles of dust and grit present in the primitive Solar System which gave rise to asteroids over 4.54 billion years ago. These asteroid parent bodies of chondrites are (or were) small to medium-sized asteroids that were never part of any body large enough to undergo melting and planetary differentiation. Dating using ^{206}Pb/^{204}Pb gives an estimated age of 4,566.6 ± 1.0 Ma, matching ages for other chronometers. Another indication of their age is the fact that the abundance of non-volatile elements in chondrites is similar to that found in the atmosphere of the Sun and other stars in the Milky Way galaxy.

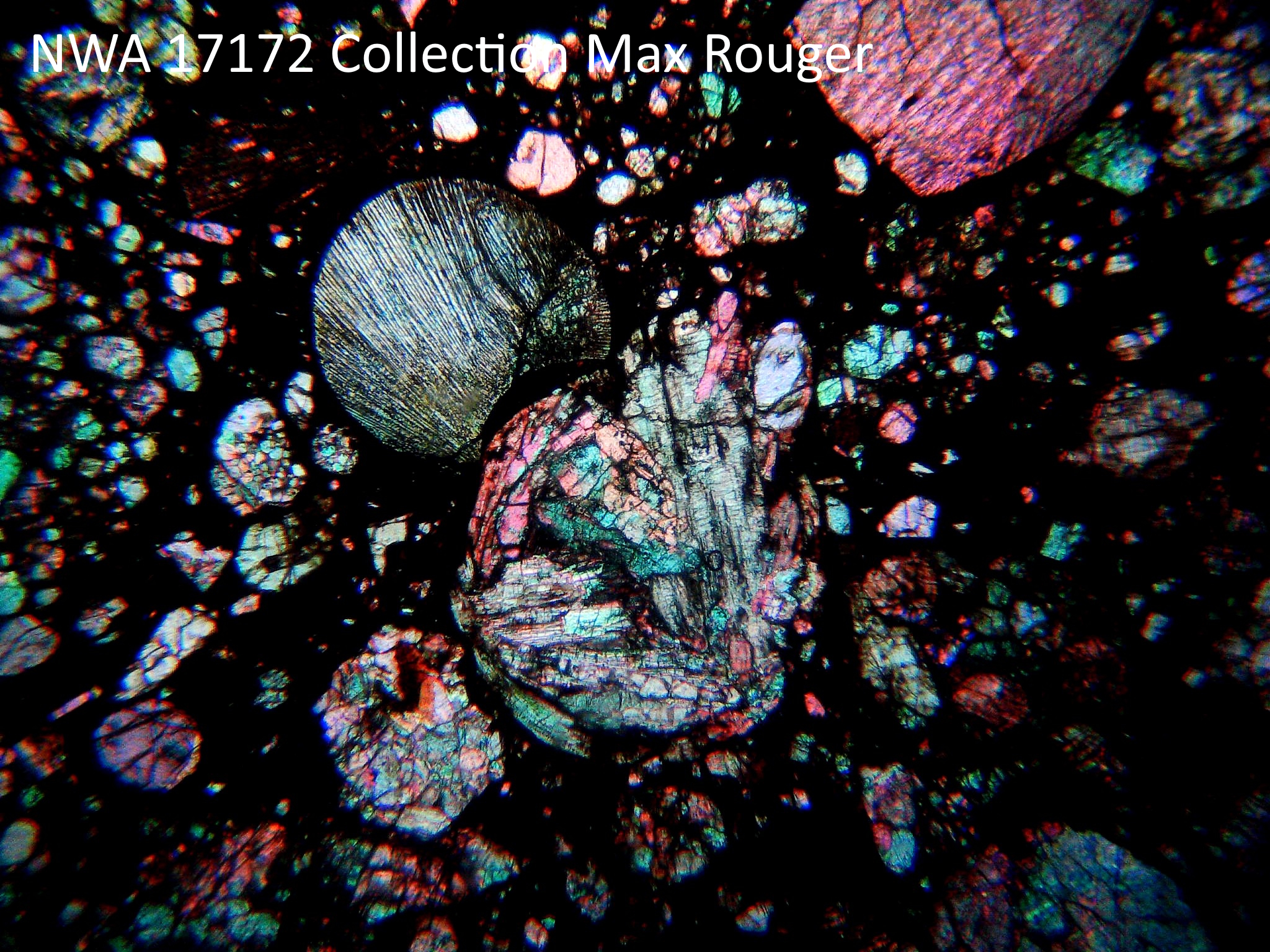
Thin slice of ordinary chondrite NWA 17172 observed under polarized light/analyzed.

Although chondritic asteroids never became hot enough to melt based upon internal temperatures, many of them reached high enough temperatures that they experienced significant thermal metamorphism in their interiors. The source of the heat was most likely energy coming from the decay of short-lived radioisotopes (half-lives less than a few million years) that were present in the newly formed Solar System, especially ^{26}Al and ^{60}Fe, although heating may have been caused by impacts onto the asteroids as well. Many chondritic asteroids also contained significant amounts of water, possibly due to the accretion of ice along with rocky material.

As a result, many chondrites contain hydrous minerals, such as clays, that formed when the water interacted with the rock on the asteroid in a process known as aqueous alteration. In addition, all chondritic asteroids were affected by impact and shock processes due to collisions with other asteroids. These events caused a variety of effects, ranging from simple compaction to brecciation, veining, localized melting, and formation of high-pressure minerals. The net result of these secondary thermal, aqueous, and shock processes is that only a few known chondrites preserve in pristine form the original dust, chondrules, and inclusions from which they formed.

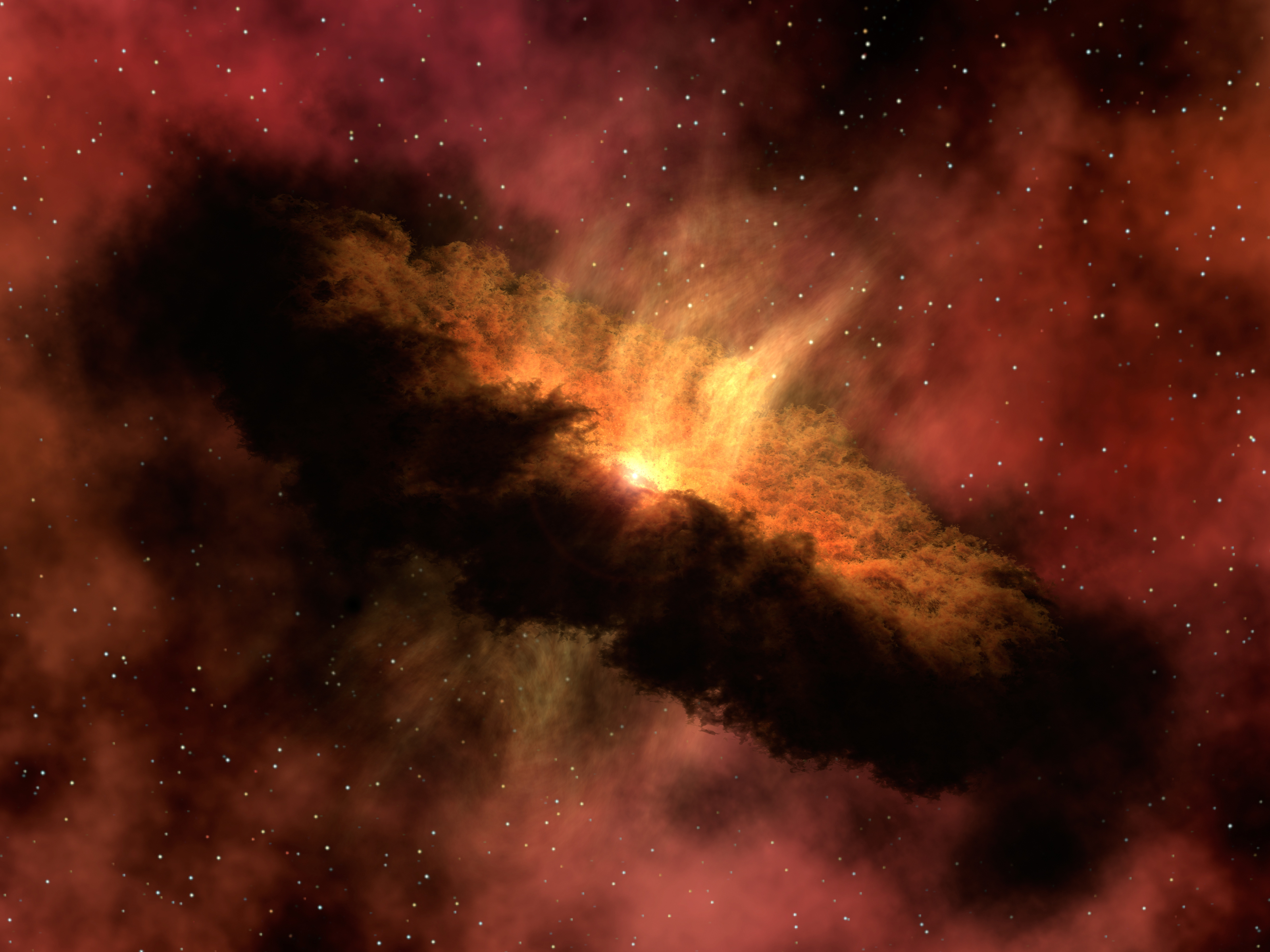
Protoplanetary disk: particles of dust and grit collide and accrete forming planets or asteroids

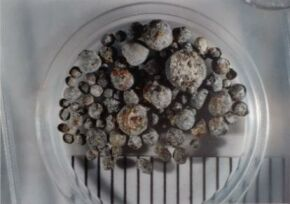
Chondrules in chondrite from the Bjurböle meteorite

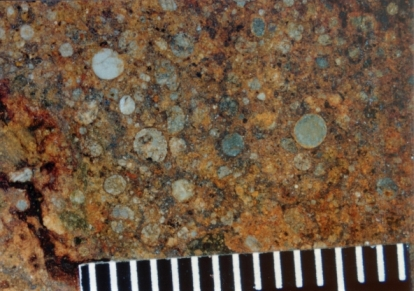
Chondrules in chondrite from the Grassland meteor

== Characteristics ==
Prominent among the components present in chondrites are the enigmatic chondrules, millimetre-sized spherical objects that originated as freely floating, molten or partially molten droplets in space; most chondrules are rich in the silicate minerals olivine and pyroxene.

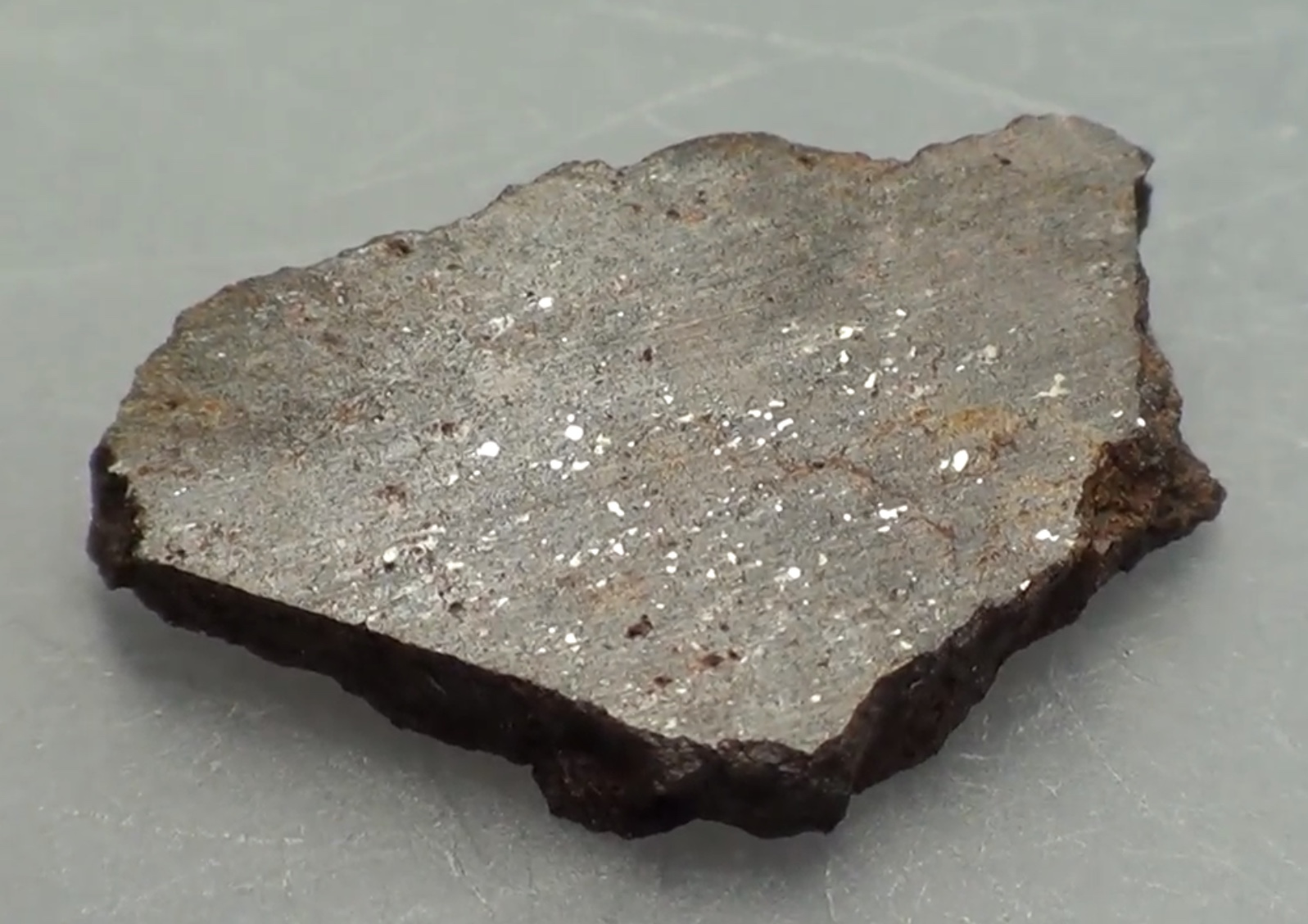
Shiny Ni/Fe metal is prominently displayed in this ordinary chondrite found in Northwest Africa

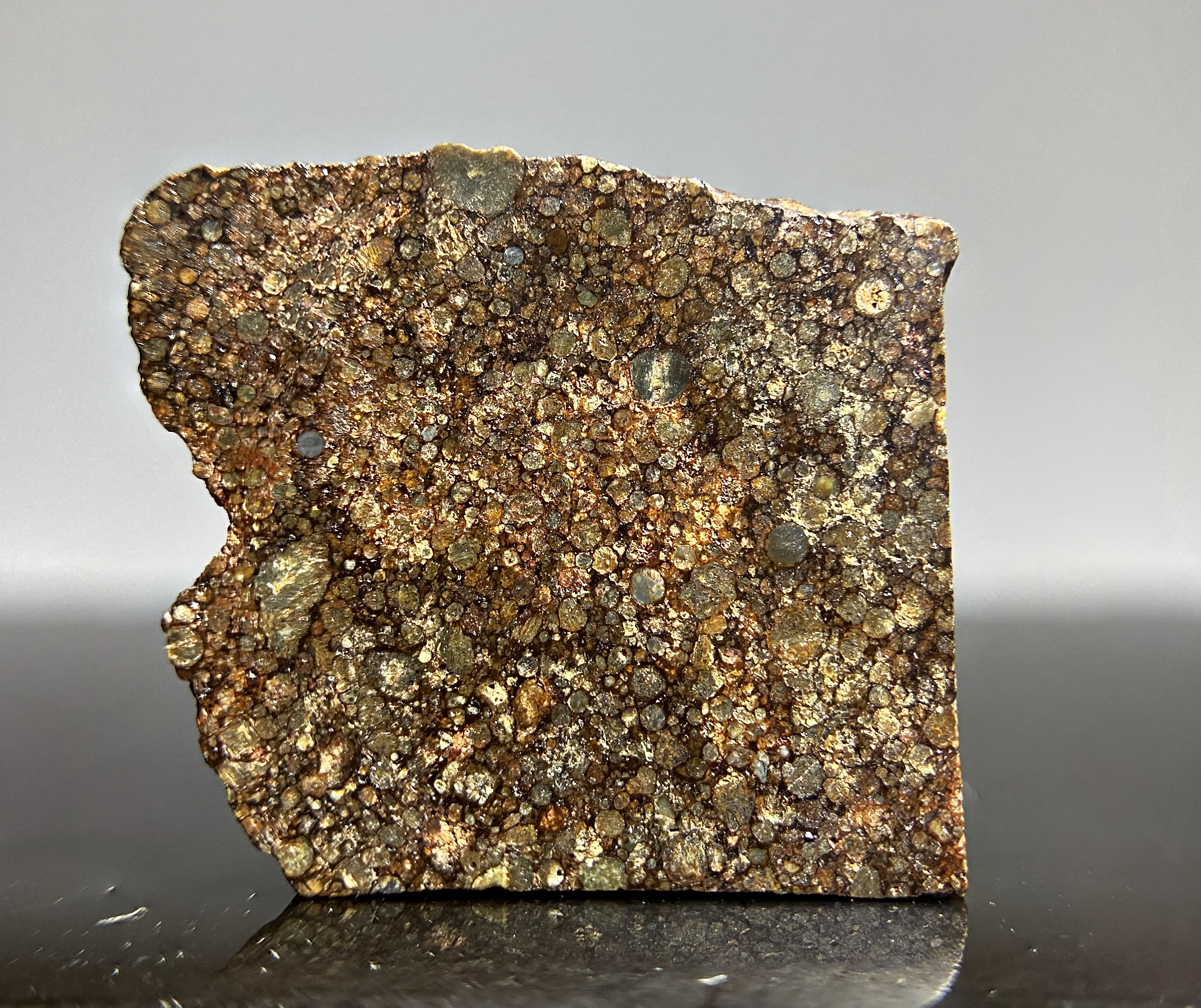
Chondrule in Chondrite from NWA 10499 LL3 Primitive Chondrite

Chondrites also contain refractory inclusions (including Ca–Al inclusions), which are among the oldest objects to form in the Solar System, particles rich in metallic Fe-Ni and sulfides, and isolated grains of silicate minerals. The remainder of chondrites consists of fine-grained (micrometre-sized or smaller) dust, which may either be present as the matrix of the rock or may form rims or mantles around individual chondrules and refractory inclusions. Embedded in this dust are presolar grains, which predate the formation of the Solar System and originated elsewhere in the galaxy. The chondrules have distinct texture, composition and mineralogy, and their origin continues to be the object of some debate. The scientific community generally accepts that these spheres were formed by the action of a shock wave that passed through the Solar System, although there is little agreement as to the cause of this shock wave.

An article published in 2005 proposed that the gravitational instability of the gaseous disk that formed Jupiter generated a shock wave with a velocity of more than 10 km/s, which resulted in the formation of the chondrules.

== Chondrite classification ==
Chondrites are divided into about 15 distinct groups (see Meteorites classification) on the basis of their mineralogy, bulk chemical composition, and oxygen isotope compositions (see below). The various chondrite groups likely originated on separate asteroids or groups of related asteroids. Each chondrite group has a distinctive mixture of chondrules, refractory inclusions, matrix (dust), and other components and a characteristic grain size. Other ways of classifying chondrites include weathering and shock.

Chondrites can also be categorized according to their petrologic type, which is the degree to which they were thermally metamorphosed or aqueously altered (they are assigned a number between 1 and 7). The chondrules in a chondrite that is assigned a "3" have not been altered. Larger numbers indicate an increase in thermal metamorphosis up to a maximum of 7, where the chondrules have been destroyed. Numbers lower than 3 are given to chondrites whose chondrules have been changed by the presence of water, down to 1, where the chondrules have been obliterated by this alteration.

A synthesis of the various classification schemes is provided in the table below.

Type	Subtype	Distinguishing features/Chondrule character	Letter designation (Note: The E stands for Enstatite, H indicates a high metallic iron content of approximately 30%, and L low. The number refers to alteration.)
Enstatite chondrites		Abundant	E3, EH3, EL3
Enstatite chondrites		Distinct	E4, EH4, EL4
Enstatite chondrites		Less distinct	E5, EH5, EL5
Enstatite chondrites		Indistinct	E6, EH6, EL6
Enstatite chondrites		Melted	E7, EH7, EL7
Ordinary chondrites	H	Abundant	H3–H3,9
Ordinary chondrites	H	Distinct	H4
Ordinary chondrites	H	Less distinct	H5
Ordinary chondrites	H	Indistinct	H6
Ordinary chondrites	H	Melted	H7
Ordinary chondrites	L	Abundant	L3–L3,9
Ordinary chondrites	L	Distinct	L4
Ordinary chondrites	L	Less distinct	L5
Ordinary chondrites	L	Indistinct	L6
Ordinary chondrites	L	Melted	L7
Ordinary chondrites	LL	Abundant	LL3–LL3,9
Ordinary chondrites	LL	Distinct	LL4
Ordinary chondrites	LL	Less distinct	LL5
Ordinary chondrites	LL	Indistinct	LL6
Ordinary chondrites	LL	Melted	LL7
Carbonaceous chondrites	Ivuna	Phyllosilicates, Magnetite	CI
Carbonaceous chondrites	Mighei	Phyllosilicates, Olivine	CM1–CM2
Carbonaceous chondrites	Vigarano	Olivines rich in Fe, Ca minerals and Al	CV2–CV3.3
Carbonaceous chondrites	Renazzo	Phyllosilicates, Olivine, Pyroxene, metals	CR
Carbonaceous chondrites	Ornans	Olivine, Pyroxene, metals, Ca minerals and Al	CO3–CO3.7
Carbonaceous chondrites	Karoonda	Olivine, Ca minerals and Al	CK
Carbonaceous chondrites	Bencubbin	Pyroxene, metals	CB
Carbonaceous chondrites	Loongana	Chondrules and CAIs, metals	CL
Carbonaceous chondrites	High Iron (Note: Except for the High Iron, all the other carbonaceous chondrites are named after a characteristic meteorite.)	Pyroxene, metals, Olivine	CH
Carbonaceous chondrites	Tagish Lake (Note: This is a unique meteorite that has been suggested to be the only known sample of the D asteroid family.)	Phyllosilicates, Magnetite, Ca-Mg-Fe carbonates	TAG
Kakangari-type			K
Rumurutiites		Olivine, Pyroxenes, Plagioclase, Sulfides	R

=== Enstatite chondrites ===
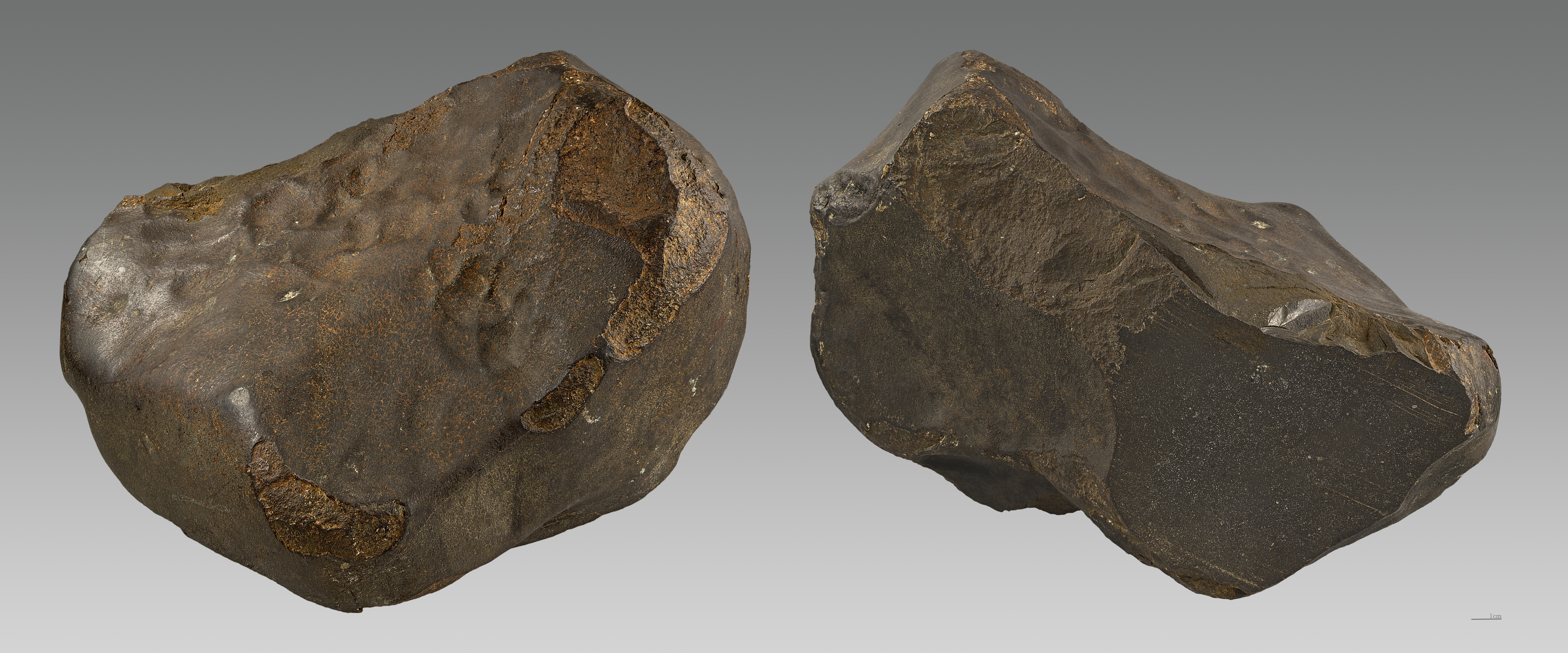
The Saint Sauveur enstatite chondrite (EH5)

Enstatite chondrites (also known as E-type chondrites) are a rare form of meteorite thought to comprise only about 2% of the chondrites that fall to Earth. Only about 200 E-Type chondrites are currently known. The majority of enstatite chondrites have either been recovered in Antarctica or have been collected by the American National Weather Association. They tend to be high in the mineral enstatite (MgSiO_{3}), from which they derive their name.

E-type chondrites are among the most chemically reduced rocks known, with most of their iron taking the form of metal or sulfide rather than as an oxide. This suggests that they were formed in an area that lacked oxygen, probably within the orbit of Mercury.

=== Ordinary chondrites ===
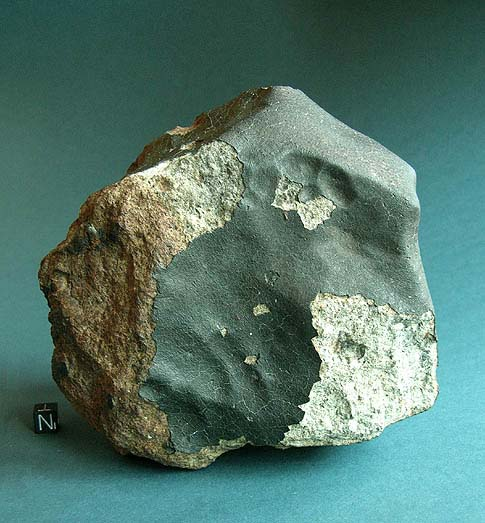
Ordinary chondrite LL6

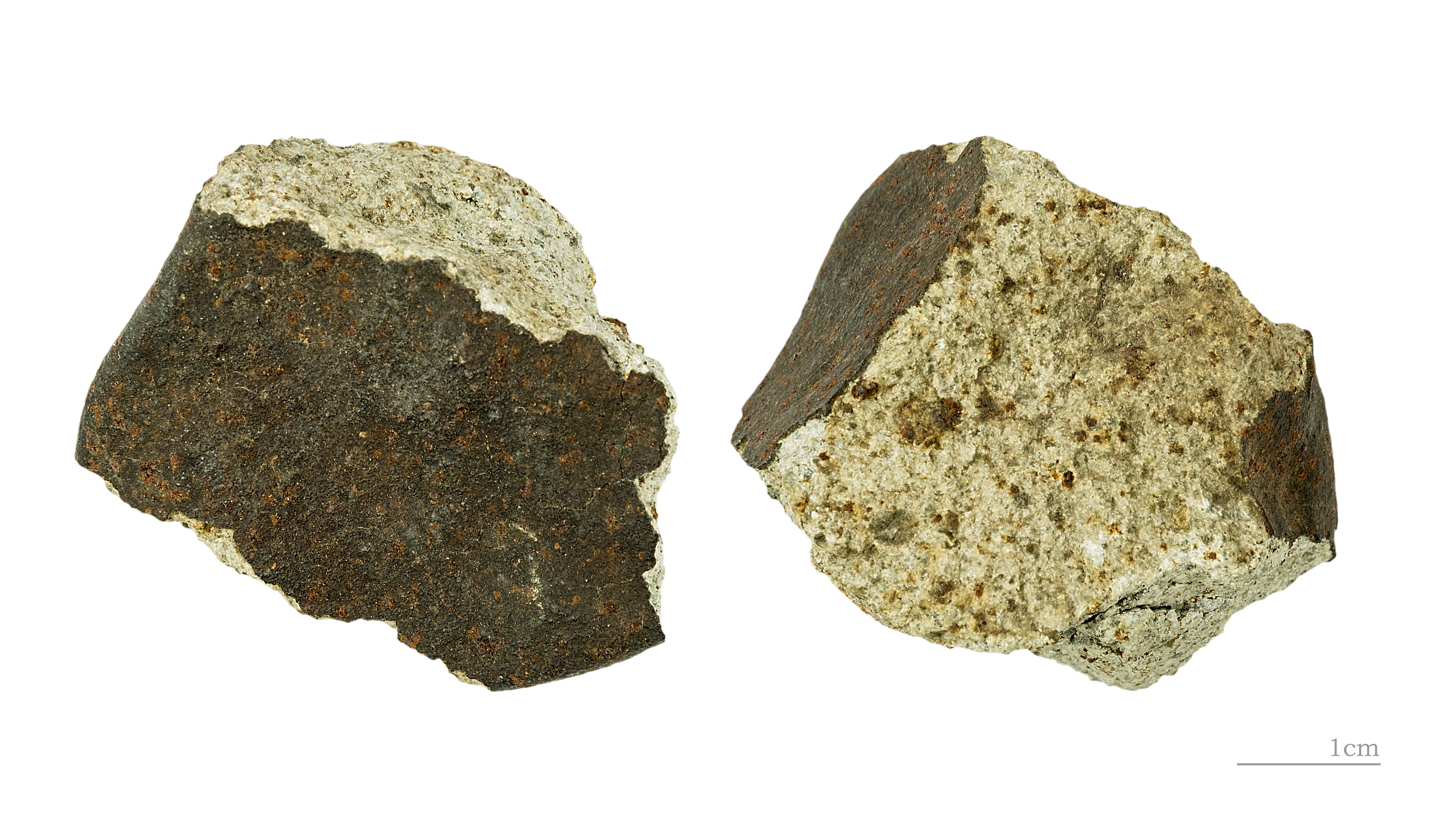
Phnom Penh Chondrite L6 – 1868

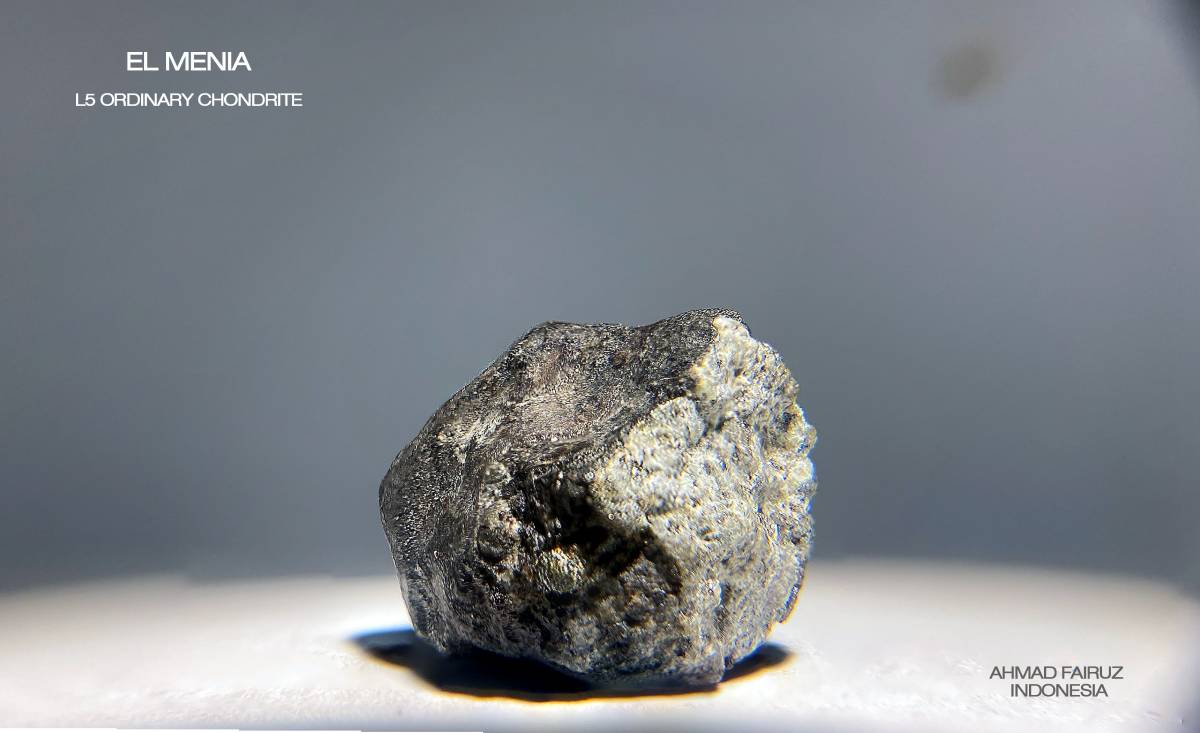
El Menia Ordinary chondrite L5 - 2023

Ordinary chondrites are by far the most common type of meteorite to fall to Earth: about 80% of all meteorites and over 90% of chondrites are ordinary chondrites. They contain abundant chondrules, sparse matrix (10–15% of the rock), few refractory inclusions, and variable amounts of Fe–Ni metal and troilite (FeS). Their chondrules are generally in the range of 0.5 to 1 mm in diameter. Ordinary chondrites are distinguished chemically by their depletions in refractory lithophile elements, such as Ca, Al, Ti, and rare earths, relative to Si, and isotopically by their unusually high ^{17}O/^{16}O ratios relative to ^{18}O/^{16}O compared to Earth rocks.

Most, but not all, ordinary chondrites have experienced significant degrees of metamorphism, having reached temperatures well above 500 °C on the parent asteroids. They are divided into three groups, which have different amounts of metal and different amounts of total iron:

- H chondrite have high total iron and high metallic Fe (15–20% Fe–Ni metal by mass), and smaller chondrules than L and LL chondrites. They are formed of bronzite, olivine, pyroxene, plagioclase, metals and sulfides and ~42% of ordinary chondrite falls belong to this group (see Meteorite fall statistics).
- L chondrites have low total iron contents (including 7–11% Fe–Ni metal by mass). ~46% of ordinary chondrite falls belong to this group, which makes them the most common type of meteorite to fall on Earth. An example of this group is the NWA 869 meteorite, a brecciated L3-6 L chondrite.
- LL chondrites have low total iron and low metal contents (3–5% Fe–Ni metal by mass of which 2% is metallic Fe and they also contain bronzite, oligoclase and olivine). Only 1 in 10 ordinary chondrite falls belong to this group. The Chelyabinsk meteorite belongs to this group.

=== Carbonaceous chondrites ===
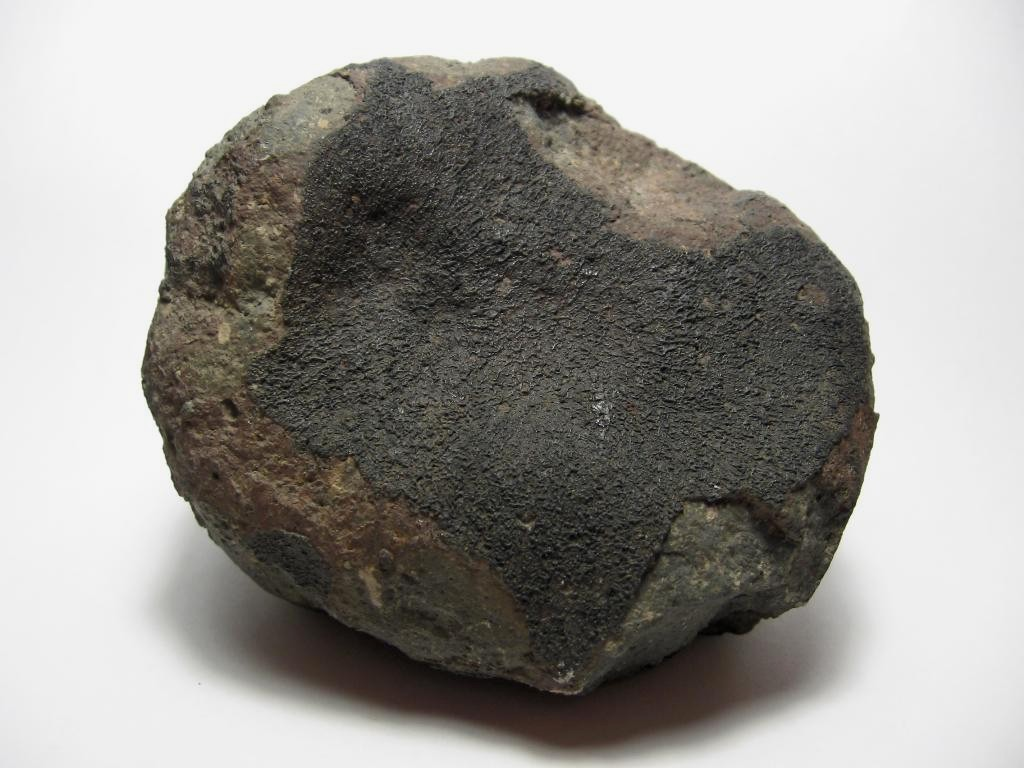
Carbonaceous chondrite CV3 that fell in Mexico in 1969

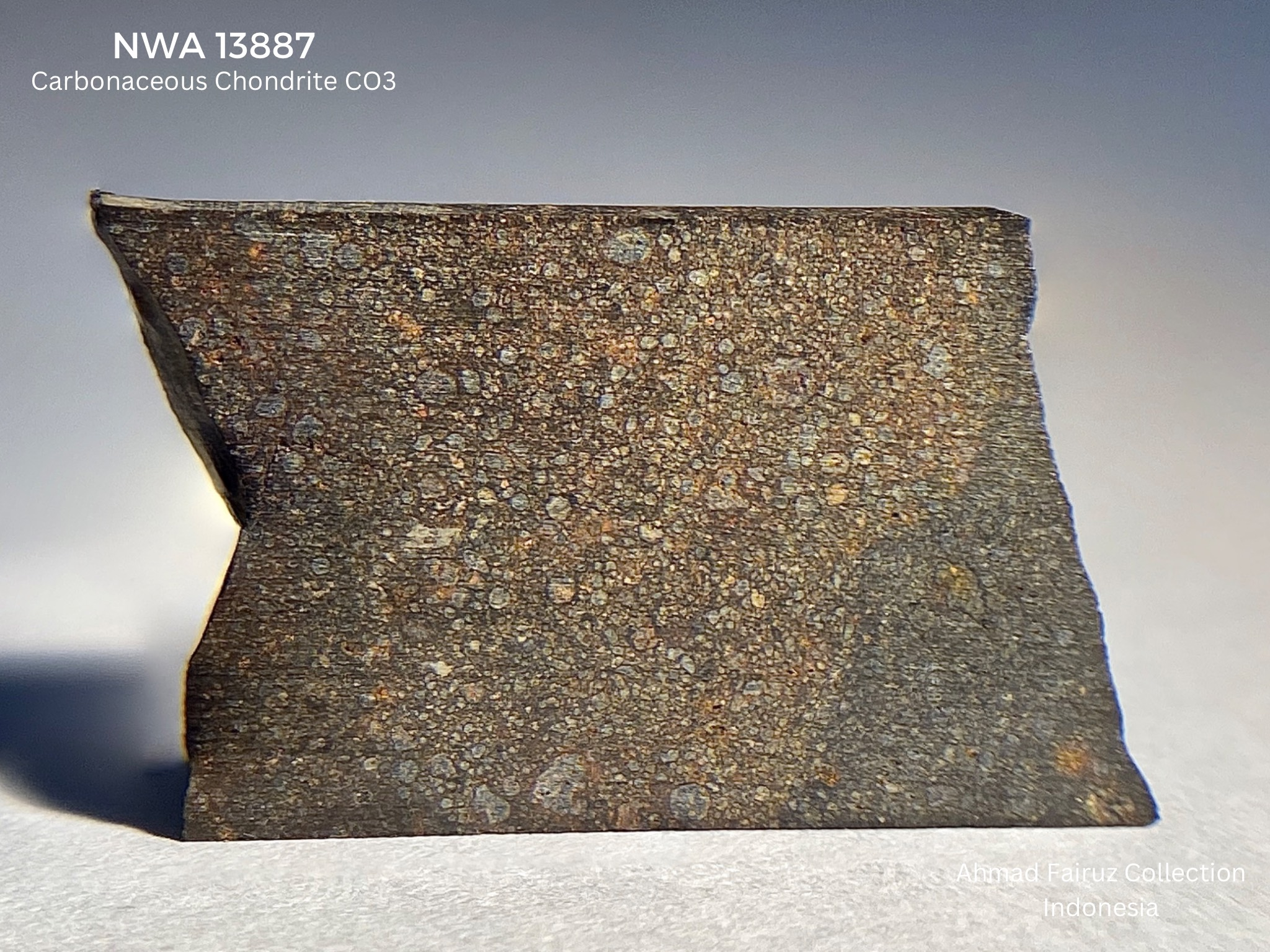
NWA 13887 Carbonaceous chondrite CO3

Carbonaceous chondrites (also known as C-type chondrites) make up less than 5% of the chondrites that fall on Earth. They are characterized by the presence of carbon compounds, including amino acids. They are thought to have been formed the farthest from the sun of any of the chondrites as they have the highest proportion of volatile compounds. Another of their main characteristics is the presence of water or of minerals that have been altered by the presence of water.

There are many groups of carbonaceous chondrites, but most of them are distinguished chemically by enrichments in refractory lithophile elements relative to Si and isotopically by unusually low ratios of ^{17}O/^{16}O relative to ^{18}O/^{16}O, when compared to Earth rocks. All groups of carbonaceous chondrites except the CH group are named for a characteristic type specimen:

- CI (Ivuna type) chondrites entirely lack chondrules and refractory inclusions; they are composed almost exclusively of fine-grained material that has experienced a high degree of aqueous alteration on the parent asteroid. CI chondrites are highly oxidized, brecciated rocks, containing abundant magnetite and sulfate minerals, and lacking metallic Fe. It is a matter of some controversy whether they once had chondrules and refractory inclusions that were later destroyed during formation of hydrous minerals, or they never had chondrules in the first place. CI chondrites are notable because their chemical compositions closely resemble that of the solar photosphere, neglecting the hydrogen and helium. Thus, they have the most "primitive" compositions of any meteorites and are often used as a standard for assessing the degree of chemical fractionation experienced by materials formed throughout the Solar System.
- CO (Ornans type) and CM (Mighei type) chondrites are two related groups that contain very small chondrules, mostly 0.1 to 0.3 mm in diameter; refractory inclusions are quite abundant and have similar sizes to chondrules.
  - CM chondrites are composed of about 70% fine-grained material (matrix), and most have experienced extensive aqueous alteration. The much studied Murchison meteorite, which fell in Australia in 1969, is the best-known member of this group.
  - CO chondrites have only about 30% matrix and have experienced very little aqueous alteration. Most have experienced small degrees of thermal metamorphism.
- CR (Renazzo type), CB (Bencubbin type), and CH (high metal) carbonaceous chondrites are three groups that seem to be related by their chemical and oxygen isotopic compositions. All are rich in metallic Fe–Ni, with CH and especially CB chondrites having a higher proportion of metal than all other chondrite groups. Although CR chondrites are clearly similar in most ways to other chondrite groups, the origins of CH and CB chondrites are somewhat controversial. Some workers conclude that many of the chondrules and metal grains in these chondrites may have formed by impact processes after "normal" chondrules had already formed, and thus they may not be "true" chondrites.

  - CR chondrites have chondrules that are similar in size to those in ordinary chondrites (near 1 mm), few refractory inclusions, and matrix comprises nearly half the rock. Many CR chondrites have experienced extensive aqueous alteration, but some have mostly escaped this process.
  - CH chondrites are remarkable for their very tiny chondrules, typically only about 0.02 mm (20 micrometres) in diameter. They have a small proportion of equally tiny refractory inclusions. Dusty material occurs as discrete clasts, rather than as a true matrix. CH chondrites are also distinguished by extreme depletions in volatile elements.
  - CB chondrites occur in two types, both of which are similar to CH chondrites in that they are very depleted in volatile elements and rich in metal. CB_{a} (subgroup a) chondrites are coarse grained, with large, often cm-sized chondrules and metal grains and almost no refractory inclusions. Chondrules have unusual textures compared to most other chondrites. As in CH chondrites, dusty material only occurs in discrete clasts, and there is no fine-grained matrix. CB_{b} (subgroup b) chondrites contain much smaller (mm-sized) chondrules and do contain refractory inclusions.
- CV (Vigarano type) chondrites are characterized by mm-sized chondrules and abundant refractory inclusions set in a dark matrix that comprises about half the rock. CV chondrites are noted for spectacular refractory inclusions, some of which reach centimetre sizes, and they are the only group to contain a distinctive type of large, once-molten inclusions. Chemically, CV chondrites have the highest abundances of refractory lithophile elements of any chondrite group. The CV group includes the remarkable Allende fall in Mexico in 1969, which became one of the most widely distributed and, certainly, the best-studied meteorite in history.
- CK (Karoonda type) chondrites are chemically and texturally similar to CV chondrites. However, they contain far fewer refractory inclusions than CV, they are much more oxidized rocks, and most of them have experienced considerable amounts of thermal metamorphism (compared to CV and all other groups of carbonaceous chondrites).
- CL (Loongana type) chondrites are largely chondrules and CAIs, correspondingly low in matrix and volatiles, with trace elements resembling CR. Triple oxygen position near the CV-CK area.
- Ungrouped carbonaceous chondrites: A number of chondrites are clearly members of the carbonaceous chondrite class, but do not fit into any of the groups. These include: the Tagish Lake meteorite, which fell in Canada in 2000 and is intermediate between CI and CM chondrites; and Acfer 094, an extremely primitive chondrite that shares properties with both CM and CO groups.

=== Kakangari chondrites ===
Three chondrites form what is known as the K (Kakangari type) grouplet: Kakangari, LEW 87232, and Lea Co. 002. They are characterized by large amounts of dusty matrix and oxygen isotope compositions similar to carbonaceous chondrites, highly reduced mineral compositions and high metal abundances (6% to 10% by volume) that are most like enstatite chondrites, and concentrations of refractory lithophile elements that are most like ordinary chondrites.

Many of their other characteristics are similar to the O, E and C chondrites.

=== Rumuruti chondrites ===
Rumuruti (R) type chondrites are a very rare group, with only one documented fall out of almost 900 documented chondrite falls. They have a number of properties in common with ordinary chondrites, including similar types of chondrules, few refractory inclusions, similar chemical composition for most elements, and the fact that ^{17}O/^{16}O ratios are anomalously high compared to Earth rocks. However, there are significant differences between R chondrites and ordinary chondrites: R chondrites have much more dusty matrix material (about 50% of the rock); they are much more oxidized, containing little metallic Fe–Ni; and their enrichments in ^{17}O are higher than those of ordinary chondrites. Nearly all the metal they contain is oxidized or in the form of sulfides. They contain fewer chondrules than the E chondrites and appear to come from an asteroid's regolith.

== Composition ==
Because chondrites accumulated from material that formed very early in the history of the Solar System, and because chondritic asteroids did not melt, they have very primitive compositions. "Primitive," in this sense, means that the abundances of most chemical elements do not differ greatly from those that are measured by spectroscopic methods in the photosphere of the sun, which in turn should be well-representative of the entire Solar System (note: to make such a comparison between a gaseous object like the sun and a rock like a chondrite, scientists choose one rock-forming element, such as silicon (Si), to use as a reference point, and then compare ratios. Thus, the atomic ratio of Mg/Si measured in the sun (1.07) is identical to that measured in CI chondrites).

Although all chondrite compositions can be considered primitive, there is variation among the different groups, as discussed above. CI chondrites seem to be nearly identical in composition to the sun for all but the gas-forming elements (e.g., hydrogen (H), carbon (C), nitrogen (N), and noble gases: helium (He), neon (Ne), argon (Ar) etc.). Other chondrite groups deviate from the solar composition (i.e., they are fractionated) in highly systematic ways:

- At some point during the formation of many chondrites, particles of metal became partially separated from particles of silicate minerals. As a result, chondrites coming from asteroids that did not accrete with their full complement of metal (e.g., L, LL, and EL chondrites) are depleted in all siderophile elements, whereas those that accreted too much metal (e.g., CH, CB, and EH chondrites) are enriched in these elements compared to the sun.
- In a similar manner, although the exact process is not very well understood, highly refractory elements like Ca and Al became separated from less refractory elements like Mg and Si, and were not uniformly sampled by each asteroid. The parent bodies of many groups of carbonaceous chondrites contain over-sampled grains rich in refractory elements, whereas those of ordinary and enstatite chondrites were deficient in them.
- No chondrites except the CI group formed with a full, solar complement of volatile elements. In general, the level of depletion corresponds to the degree of volatility, where the most volatile elements are most depleted.

== Petrologic types ==
A chondrite's group is determined by its primary chemical, mineralogical, and isotopic characteristics (above). The degree to which it has been affected by the secondary processes of thermal metamorphism and aqueous alteration on the parent asteroid is indicated by its petrologic type, which appears as a number following the group name (e.g., an LL5 chondrite belongs to the LL group and has a petrologic type of 5). The current scheme for describing petrologic types was devised by Van Schmus and Wood in 1967.

The petrologic-type scheme originated by Van Schmus and Wood is really two separate schemes, one describing aqueous alteration (types 1–2) and one describing thermal metamorphism (types 3–6). The aqueous alteration part of the system works as follows:

- Type 1 was originally used to designate chondrites that lacked chondrules and contained large amounts of water and carbon. Current usage of type 1 is simply to indicate meteorites that have experienced extensive aqueous alteration, to the point that most of their olivine and pyroxene have been altered to hydrous phases. This alteration took place at temperatures of 50 to 150 °C, so type 1 chondrites were warm, but not hot enough to experience thermal metamorphism. The members of the CI group, plus a few highly altered carbonaceous chondrites of other groups, are the only instances of type 1 chondrites.
- Type 2 chondrites are those that have experienced extensive aqueous alteration, but still contain recognizable chondrules as well as primary, unaltered olivine and/or pyroxene. The fine-grained matrix is generally fully hydrated and minerals inside chondrules may show variable degrees of hydration. This alteration probably occurred at temperatures below 20 °C, and again, these meteorites are not thermally metamorphosed. Almost all CM and CR chondrites are petrologic type 2; with the exception of some ungrouped carbonaceous chondrites, no other chondrites are type 2.

The thermal metamorphism part of the scheme describes a continuous sequence of changes to mineralogy and texture that accompany increasing metamorphic temperatures. These chondrites show little evidence of the effects of aqueous alteration:

- Type 3 chondrites show low degrees of metamorphism. They are often referred to as unequilibrated chondrites because minerals such as olivine and pyroxene show a wide range of compositions, reflecting formation under a wide variety of conditions in the solar nebula. (Type 1 and 2 chondrites are also unequilibrated.) Chondrites that remain in nearly pristine condition, with all components (chondrules, matrix, etc.) having nearly the same composition and mineralogy as when they accreted to the parent asteroid, are designated type 3.0. As petrologic type increases from type 3.1 through 3.9, profound mineralogical changes occur, starting in the dusty matrix, and then increasingly affecting the coarser-grained components like chondrules. Type 3.9 chondrites still look superficially unchanged because chondrules retain their original appearances, but all of the minerals have been affected, mostly due to diffusion of elements between grains of different composition.
- Types 4, 5, and 6 chondrites have been increasingly altered by thermal metamorphism. These are equilibrated chondrites, in which the compositions of most minerals have become quite homogeneous due to high temperatures. By type 4, the matrix has thoroughly recrystallized and coarsened in grain size. By type 5, chondrules begin to become indistinct and matrix cannot be discerned. In type 6 chondrites, chondrules begin to integrate with what was once matrix, and small chondrules may no longer be recognizable. As metamorphism proceeds, many minerals coarsen and new, metamorphic minerals such as feldspar form.

Some workers have extended the Van Schmus and Wood metamorphic scheme to include a type 7, although there is not consensus on whether this is necessary. Type 7 chondrites have experienced the highest temperatures possible, short of that required to produce melting. Should the onset of melting occur the meteorite would probably be classified as a primitive achondrite instead of a chondrite.

All groups of ordinary and enstatite chondrites, as well as R and CK chondrites, show the complete metamorphic range from type 3 to 6. CO chondrites comprise only type 3 members, although these span a range of petrologic types from 3.0 to 3.8.

== Presence of water ==
These meteorites either contain a proportion of water or minerals that have been altered by water. This suggests that the asteroid from which these meteorites originate must have contained water. At the beginning of the Solar System this would have been present as ice and a few million years after the asteroid formed the ice would have melted allowing the liquid water to react with and alter the olivines and pyroxenes. The formation of rivers and lakes on the asteroid is thought to have been unlikely if it was sufficiently porous to allow the water to percolate towards its interior, as occurs in terrestrial aquifers.

It is thought possible that a proportion of the water present on the Earth comes from the impact of comets and carbonaceous chondrites with the Earth's surface.

== Origin of life ==
Amino acid general structure

Carbonaceous chondrites contain more than 600 organic compounds that were synthesized in distinct places and at distinct times. These organic compounds include: hydrocarbons, carboxylic acids, alcohols, ketones, aldehydes, amines, amides, sulfonic acids, phosphonic acids, amino acids, nitrogenous bases, etc. These compounds can be divided into three main groups: a fraction that is not soluble in chloroform or methanol, chloroform soluble hydrocarbons and a fraction that is soluble in methanol (which includes the amino acids).

The first fraction appears to originate from interstellar space and the compounds belonging to the other fractions derive from a minor planet. It has been proposed that the amino acids were synthesized close to the surface of a minor planet by the radiolysis (dissociation of molecules caused by radiation) of hydrocarbons and ammonium carbonate in the presence of liquid water. In addition, the hydrocarbons could have formed deep within a planetoid by a process similar to the Fischer–Tropsch process. These conditions could be analogous to the events that caused the origin of life on Earth.

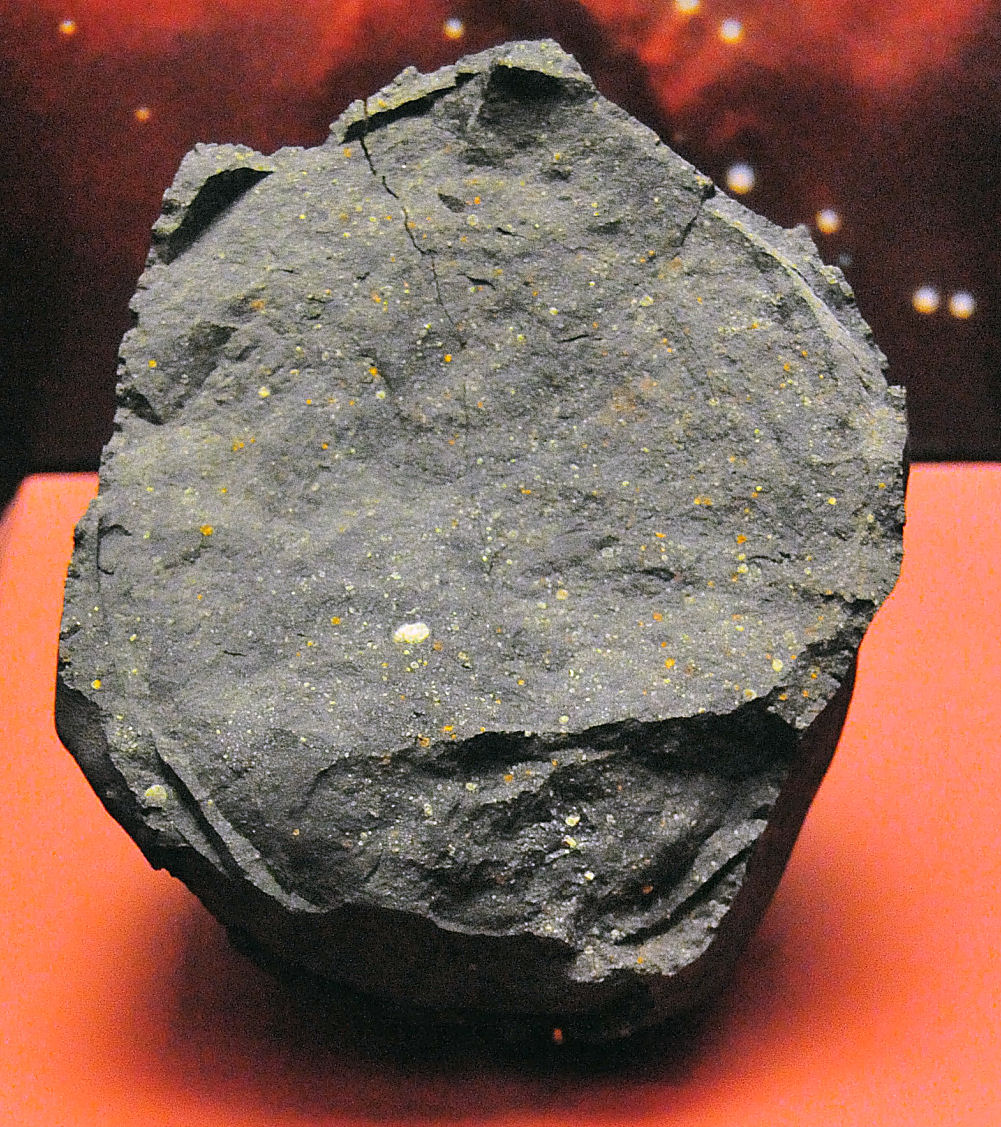
The Murchison meteorite is on display at the Smithsonian's NMNH.

The Murchison meteorite has been thoroughly studied; it fell in Australia close to the town that bears its name on 28 September 1969. It is a CM2 and it contains common amino acids such as glycine, alanine and glutamic acid as well as other less common ones such as isovaline and pseudo-leucine.

Two meteorites that were collected in Antarctica in 1992 and 1995 were found to be abundant in amino acids, which are present at concentrations of 180 and 249 ppm (carbonaceous chondrites normally contain concentrations of 15 ppm or less). This could indicate that organic material is more abundant in the Solar System than was previously believed, and it reinforces the idea that the organic compounds present in the primordial soup could have had an extraterrestrial origin.

== See also ==
- Meteorite
- Meteorite classification
- Achondrite
- Carbonaceous chondrite
- Chondrule
- Glossary of meteoritics
- Iron meteorite
- Stony-iron meteorite
- Asteroid
- Solar System
