= CM chondrite =

Group of meteorites

CM chondrites are a group of chondritic meteorites which resemble their type specimen, the Mighei meteorite. The CM is the most commonly recovered group of the 'carbonaceous chondrite' class of meteorites, though all are rarer in collections than ordinary chondrites.

== Overview and Taxonomy ==
Meteorites mostly divide into Ordinary and 'Carbonaceous' chondrite classes; far fewer belong to lesser classes like Enstatites and Ureilites. The term 'chondrite' indicates that these contain (or may have contained) chondrules in a matrix. Chondrules are cooled droplets of minerals, predating the meteorites themselves. The term 'carbonaceous' was assigned relative to the ordinary chondrites; some Enstatite and Ureilite meteorites may have more carbon than C-chondrites. Still, all C-chondrites are distinguished from ordinary chondrites by a non-trace carbon content (resulting in a dark color), plus other volatiles, giving a lower density. After the classes were devised, a more rigorous definition was found: C-chondrites contain proportionally higher magnesium than ordinary chondrites.

The C-chondrites subdivide into CI, CM, CO, CV, CK, CR, and lesser groups (CH, CB, and ungrouped C-meteorites). Specimens are formed into groups by their petrological and chemical qualities, and the group named for a salient example. These include the CI (Ivuna-like), CM (Mighei-like), CO (Ornans-like), etc. The CM group most resembles the CI and CO chondrites; a CM–CO is sometimes described. All three groups contain clearly anomalous ^{50}Ti and ^{54}Cr isotopes.

Though the C-chondrites are far rarer than ordinary chondrites, the CM group is "the most abundant type of" them. The latest Catalogue of Meteorites (5th edition, 2000) gives 15 CM falls (observed entries, then recoveries), and 146 finds (meteorites with entries unobserved, possibly ancient). By contrast, the next highest are the COs- 5 falls, 80 finds listed. These are in a class of 36 C-chondrite falls, 435 finds. If the CMs and COs are taken to be a clan, its dominance is even higher.

== Petrologic types ==
C-chondrites in general, and CM chondrites among them, have low densities for meteorites. CMs are slightly more dense (~2.1 gram/cc) than the CIs, but less dense than CO and other C-chondrites. This is due to a combination of brecciation (rock lithified from fragments of prior rocks) including porosities and inherently light constituent materials (see chemistry, below). (Rare unbrecciated CMs include Y-791198 and ALH81002.)

Based primarily on petrology, early scientists attempted to quantify different meteorites. Rose ("kohlige meteorite"), then Tschermak devised early taxonomies. In the 1904 scheme of Brezina, today's CM chondrites would be "K" ("coaly chondrites"). Wiik published the first recognizably modern system in 1956, dividing meteorites into Type I, II, and III. CMs fell within Wiik's Type II.

The CM chondrites are essentially all Type 2 in the petrographic scale of Van Schmus and Wood 1967; by that time, CI and CM recoveries were enough to define the 'left' (aqueous alteration) end of the scale. (CI chondrites, the Van Schmus Wood Type 1, is equivalent to Wiik's Type I, etc.) The types 4 through 6 indicate increasing thermal alteration; Type 3 is assumed to be unaltered.

Type	1	2	3	4	5	6	7
Homogeneity of olivine and pyroxene compositions	–	>5% mean deviations		≤5%	Homogeneous		
Structural state of low-Ca pyroxene	–	Predominantly monoclinic		>20% monoclinic	≤20% monoclinic	Orthorhombic	
Degree of development of secondary feldspar	–	Minor primary grains		Secondary <2-um grains	Secondary 2–50-um grains	Secondary >50-um grains	
Chondrule glass	Altered or absent	Mostly altered, some preserved	Clear, isotropic	Devitrified	Absent		
Metal: Maximum Ni content	–	<20% Taenite minor or absent	>20% kamacite and taenite in exsolution relationship				
Sulfides: Mean Ni content	–	>0.5%	<0.5%				
Overall Texture	No chondrules	Sharp chondrule boundaries		Some chondrules can be discerned, fewer sharp edges		Chondrules poorly delineated	Primary textures destroyed
Matrix	Fine-grained, opaque	Mostly fine-grained opaque	Opaque to transparent	Transparent, recrystallized			
Bulk carbon content	~2.8%	~0.6–2.8%	~0.2–1.0%	<0.2%			
Bulk water content	~20%	~4–18%	0.3–3%	<1.5%			

Van Schmus, Wood 1967; Sears, Dodd 1988; Brearley, Jones 1998; Weisberg 2006

The modern groups 'V' and 'O' were named by Van Schmus in 1969 as divisions of Type 3, as 'subclass C3V' and 'C3O'. Wasson then added C2M in 1974; since then, C2Ms have generally been shortened to simply 'CM', as have the other groups.

Petrologic types by group
Group	1	2	3	4	5	6	7
CI							
CM							
CR							
CH							
CB							
CV							
CO							
CK							

After Weisberg et al. 2006, Giese et al. 2019 Note: lone CV2 specimen, Mundrabilla 012

=== Chondrules and similar ===
As Type 2 meteorites, CM chondrites have some remaining chondrules; others have been modified or dissolved by water. COs have more chondrules; CIs have either trace outlines of former chondrules ("pseudomorphs") or, some have argued, never contained any chondrules at all. Many CM chondrules are surrounded by either rims of accessory minerals, or haloes of water-altered chondrule material.

The chondrules of CM chondrites, though fewer, are larger than in COs. While CM chondrules are smaller than average in diameter (~300 micrometer), CO chondrules are exceptionally small (~170 um). This may be a survivor bias: consider that the water which dissolves CM chondrules successfully eliminates those which are already small, while those which were large may remain to be observed, though with less of the original material. Similarly, CMs contain minor CAIs (calcium–aluminium rich inclusions).

=== Matrix ===
The matrix of CMs (ground material, between chondrules) has been described as "sponge" or "spongy."

Grains of olivine and pyroxene silicates, too, are fewer in CM meteorites than COs, but more than CIs. As with chondrules, these are water-susceptible, and follow the water progression of the petrographic scale. So, too, do grains of free metal. CO meteorites contain higher levels of free metal domains, where CIs have mostly oxidized theirs; CMs are in between.

Both free metal, and grains of olivine/pyroxene, have been largely or predominantly altered to matrix materials. A CM meteorite will consist of more matrix than a CO, but less than a CI (which are essentially all matrix, per Van Schmus & Wood 1967).

In 1860, Wohler presciently or coincidentally identified matrix as serpentinite. Fuchs et al. 1973, unable to identify the constituent phyllosilicates, gave matrix as "poorly characterized phase" (PCP). Cronstedtite was published by Kurat and Kracher in 1975.

Tomeoka and Buseck, identifying cronstedtite and tochilinite in 1985, gave matrix material as "FESON" (Fe–Ni–S–O layers), as well as the backronym "partly characterized phase" for "PCP." Later authors would use the term TCI, tochilinite-cronstedtite intergrowths. Less common phyllosilicates include chlorite, vermiculite, and saponite.

=== Sub-Classification ===
The CM group is both numerous and diverse. Multiple attempts have been made to subdivide the group beyond the Van Schmus–Wood typing. McSween 1979 was an early proposal. After him, these add a suffix after the petrologic type, with 'CM2.9' referring to less-altered, CO-like specimens, and 'CM2.0' being more-altered, CI-like meteorites. (As of recently, no true 2.9 specimens have been catalogued.)

McSween 1979 graded the amount of matrix versus total amount, and the depletion of iron in the matrix, to quantify higher degrees of alteration.

Browning et al. 1996 devised a formula ("MAI," Mineralogical Alteration Index), quantified the amount of unaltered silicate grains, and graded the alteration level of chondrules to quantify alteration.

Rubin et al. 2007 added measurement of carbonates, with more dolomite and less calcite indicating higher alteration.

Howard et al. 2009, 2011 measured total abundance of phyllosilicates to quantify alteration.

Alexander et al. 2012, 2013 measured deuterium level, C/H, and nitrogen isotopes to quantify alteration.

This line of inquiry continues, as the systems have some disagreement on specimens. Murchison is consistently ranked as low-alteration, but authors differ on some more-altered meteorites.

=== Transitional examples ===
CM–CO

- Paris – described as "the least altered CM chondrite so far" "that bridges the gap between CMs and COs"
- ALHA77307
- Adelaide
- Acfer 094
- MAC87300, MAC88107

CM–CI

- Bells
- EET83334
- ALH88045
- Tagish Lake
- Dhofar 225

=== Water ===
The CI and CM chondrites are the "water rich" meteorites, CMs having 3–14 wt% water. Water is contained in tochilinite, cronstedtite, and others.

This water, not comets, was the likely origin of Earth's oceans via isotope tracing (primarily deuterium, but also others).

==== Fluid inclusions ====
Fluid inclusions containing meteorite water have long been reported; however, these claims were doubted due to, e. g., contamination by cutting fluids during sectioning. More modern claims have taken steps such as waterless preparation.

== Chemistry ==
Carbonaceous chondrites, as the name suggests, contain appreciable carbon compounds. These include native carbon, simple compounds like metal carbides and carbonates, organic chains, and polycyclic aromatic hydrocarbons (PAHs).

The elemental abundances of some C-chondrite groups (with the obvious exception of hydrogen, helium, and some other elements, see below) have long been known to resemble solar abundance values. The CI chondrites, in particular, correspond "quite closely, more so than does any other type of meteoric or terrestrial matter"; called "somewhat miraculous". Of course, only gas giant planets have the mass to retain, explicitly, hydrogen and helium. This extends to most noble gases, and to lesser amounts the elements N, O and C, the atmophiles. Other elements- volatiles and refractories- have correspondences between CI chondrites and the solar photosphere and solar wind such that the CI group is used as a cosmochemical standard. As the Sun is 99% of the mass of the Solar System, knowing the solar abundance is the starting point for any other part or process of this System.

The solar correspondence is similar but weaker in CM chondrites. More-volatile elements have been somewhat depleted relative to the CIs, and more-refractory elements somewhat enriched.

A small amount of meteorite materials are small presolar grains (PSGs). These are crystals of material which survives from interstellar space, since before the formation of the Solar System. PSGs include silicon carbide ("Moissanite") and micro-diamonds, as well as other refractory minerals such as corundum and zircon. The isotope levels of their elements do not match solar system levels, instead being closer to e. g., the interstellar medium. PSGs themselves may contain smaller PSGs.

As with other meteorite classes, some carbon content is as carbides (often Cohenite, Fe_{3}C with e.g., nickel substitutions) and carbonates such as calcite and dolomite. Aragonite appears, where CIs contain little or none.

Total carbon compounds in CM chondrites are lower than in CI chondrites; however, more are aromatics. Isotope profiling indicates these are meteoritic, not terrestrial.

The organics of C-chondrites divide into soluble, and IOM (Insoluble Organic Matter). The soluble fraction would yield to the chemistry techniques of the mid-20th century, giving paraffin, naphthene and aromatics, with other contributions.

The IOM is, however, the clear majority of the organic component; in 1963, Briggs and Mamikunian could only give it as "very high molecular weight". IOM itself divides into two components: thermally labile, and refractory.

=== Amino acids ===
Amino acids and other organics were first reported by multiple groups; however, concentrations were low to undetectable, and claimed to be terrestrial contamination. The 1969 fall of the Murchison meteorite provided over 100 kg of sample, the largest CM ever. Specimens were recovered quickly, from a dry area. Combined with progress in, e.g., biochemistry and petrochemistry techniques, the question could be addressed more definitively: sugars and amino acids existed in space, via meteorites. This includes non-terrestrial amino acids. Multiple isotopes do not match Earth levels, strong evidence for non-contamination.

The levels of amino acids are higher in CMs than CIs.

Amino-like nitriles/cyanides and heterocycles are also found. These related organics may be decomposition products or precursors.

==== Chirality ====
The early analyses did not record optical rotation, and gave meteoritic organics as racemic. As amino acids are diverse but low, the discovery of meteoritic chirality had to await the separation of IOM. Handedness of some meteorite organics is now accepted (see below), including in the soluble organic fraction.

Meteoritic Amino Acids
Amino Acid	Ref
Glycine	1
Alanine	1
Serine	5
Isoserine	4
Homoserine	4
β-Homoserine	4
d-2,3-diaminopropanoic acid	2
α-Methylserine	4
Threonine	5
Isothreonine	4
allo-Isothreonine	4
Asparagine	5
2,3-Diaminobutanoic acid	2
Glutamic acid	1
Valine	1
Isovaline	3
Norvaline	3
Proline	1
Leucine	5
Isoleucine	5
Norleucine	3
2-methylalanine	1
Isobutylamine	6
Histamine	5
Isovaline	6
Sarcosine	1

1. Kvenvolden et al. 1970; 2. Meierheinrich et al. 2004 3. Martins et al. 2015 4. Koga et al. 2017; 5. Rudraswami et al. 2018; 6. Pizzarello, Yarnes 2018

=== Gas ===
The first publication of anomalous gas in a carbonaceous chondrite (Murray) was in 1960. "Gas-rich meteorites" of other classes host their gas in dark liths, in most cases closely related to CM.

Gases in meteorites include primordial, solar (both solar wind, and a distinct solar flare component), radiogenic (due to cosmic-ray exposure), and fissile (decay products). Host materials are generally carbonaceous, including presolar grains: diamond, silicon carbide, graphite, and organics.

Nogoya is one particularly gas-rich CM chondrite.

Micrometeorites lose significant amounts of their gas to entry heating, but still deliver quantifiable amounts.

=== Isotopic analyses ===
Isotope studies have become vital in examining natural histories. Oxygen, in particular, forms quite stable oxides; it requires significant events, processes, or energies to segregate isotopes by their slight mass differences.

CM and CI chondrites have a measurable difference in oxygen isotope levels. This suggests a different formation temperature, and hence a different zone of the young Solar System. However, CM and CO meteorites were found to have similar oxygen isotopes, indicating a relationship.

== Provenance ==
CMs, like other C-chondrites, are subjected to a serious observation bias. C-chondrites are friable, due to both macro-scale porosity and micro-scale matrices of phyllosilicates, with many chondrules also having layers such as phyllosilicates. The meteorites have been described as "tuff" (compacted volcanic ash).

As one example, the Tagish Lake meteorite provided ~10 kg of samples, from a meteor estimated to be 60–90 tons before entry.

By contrast, many ordinary chondrite meteorites are tougher and overrepresented, and iron meteorites even more so.

CI and CM chondrites in particular are then subject to weathering on the ground. As large fractions of C-chondrite material are water soluble, ordinary chondrites and irons are more likely to be recognized and recovered. Greater coverage of hot deserts and Antarctica has resulted in many C-chondrite specimens.

=== Parent body(s) ===
As carbonaceous specimens, CM and other groups are widely assumed to be from carbonaceous asteroids. This includes the explicit C-type asteroids, and to various degrees the related G-, B- (including the deprecated F-), D-, and P-types. As carbonaceous types are the majority of asteroids, but only a few percent of recovered meteorites, selection/filtering effects must be severe.

Aside from the diversity of CMs, and the diversity of C-asteroid types and subtypes (besides the asteroids themselves), the question of parentage is very open as of this writing. The Almahata Sitta meteorite was catalogued as a ureilite, an entirely different meteorite class. However, it entered as asteroid 2008 TC_{3}. A crude spectrum was taken before entry, which would have placed 2008 TC_{3} as a F- or B-type.

Some amount of space weathering is seen to occur on carbonaceous asteroids; this complicates attempts to link parents via spectroscopy.

A hypothesis persists that all CMs stem from a single parent.

=== Polymict meteorites ===
Brecciated meteorites include monomict breccias (re-formed from rock fragments on a single type) and polymict ones (incorporating different source rocks). Polymict meteorites record exchanges between sites. C-chondrite materials are often found in such meteorites.

- PRA 04401 – nominally a HED, contains as much CM or CM-like material in clasts as HED material
- Kaidun – a "kitchen sink" breccia
- Supuhee
- Plainview
- Jodzie

== Open issues ==
- Formation and history
- Origin of Earth's water
- Origin of life

== List of CM chondrites ==
=== Notable specimens ===
- Mighei – 1889; from which the group name derives
- Cold Bokkevelt – 1838; a find, but from an arid region, and considered reasonably unaltered
- Nogoya – 1879;
- Boriskino – 1930;
- Murray – 1950;
- Murchison – 1969; large total known weight of 100 kg recovered, resulting in extensive study
- Yamato 74662 – 1974; first Antarctic CM

=== Recently recovered CM chondrites ===
- Aguas Zarcas – Apr 2019 fall, specimens recovered quickly; >20 kg
- Winchcombe meteorite
- Mukundpura meteorite – 6 June 2017 fall, broke up during impact; 2.2 kg of fragments were recovered within hours

== See also ==
- Evaporite and Mudstone
- Oil shale
- Tholin and Kerogen
- List of interstellar and circumstellar molecules

== General References ==
- Mason, B. The Carbonaceous Chondrites. 1962 Space Sciences Reviews vol. 1, p. 621
- Meteorites and the Early Solar System, Kerridge, J. Matthews, M. eds. 1988 University of Arizona Press, Tucson ISBN 9780816510634
- Planetary Materials, Papike, J., ed. 1999 Mineralogical Society of America, Washington DC ISBN 0-939950-46-4
- The Catalogue of Meteorites, Grady, M. ed. 2000 Cambridge University Press, Cambridge ISBN 0 521 66303 2
- Meteorites and the Early Solar System II, Lauretta, D. McSween, H. eds. 2006 University of Arizona Press, Tucson ISBN 9780816525621
