= Moss meteorite =

Meteorite found in Norway

Moss
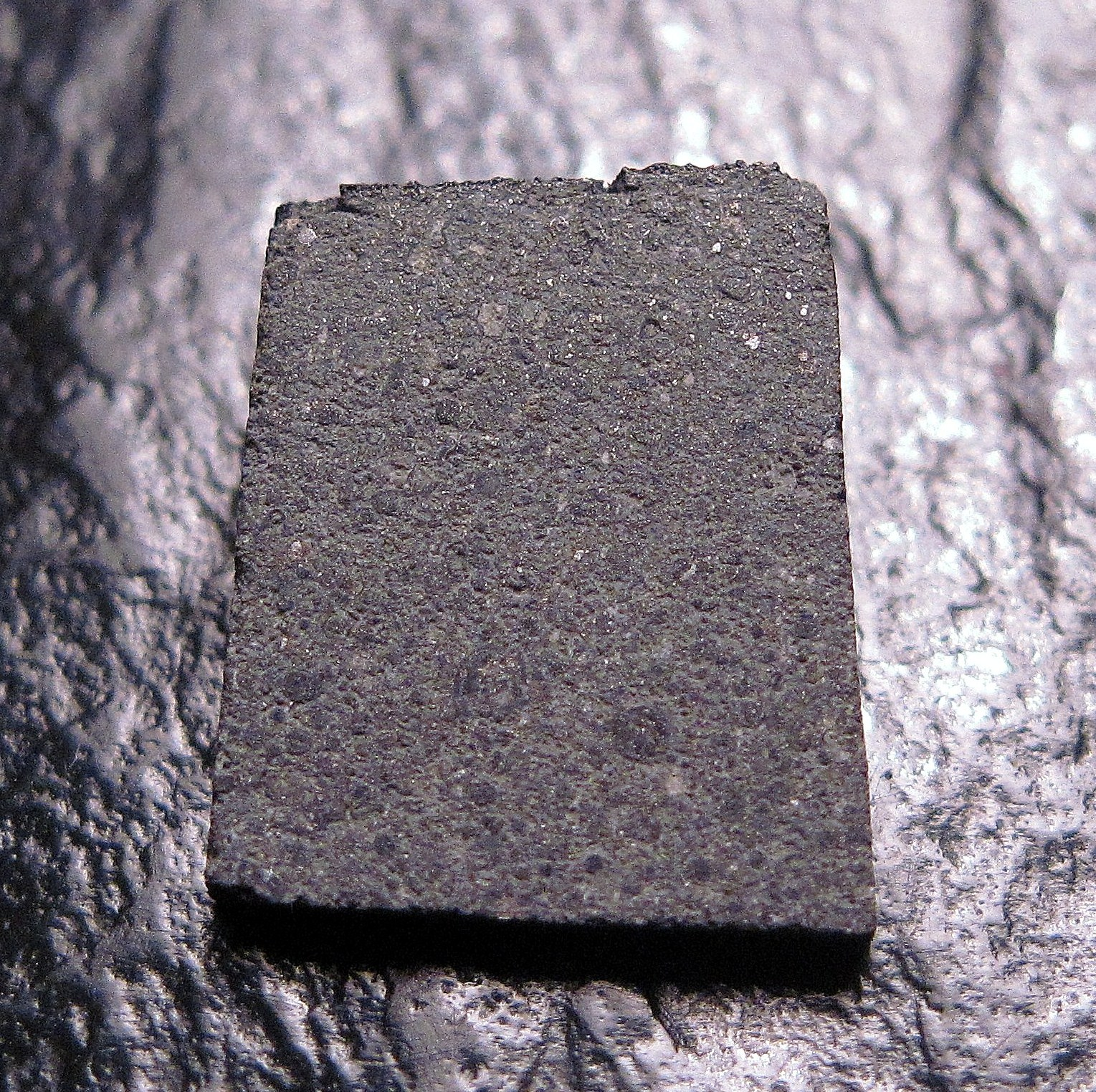
- Type: Chondrite
- Class: Carbonaceous chondrite
- Group: CO3
- Shock stage: S2
- Country: Norway
- Region: Moss and Rygge, Østfold county (fylke)
- Coordinates: 59°26′N 10°42′E
- Observed fall: Yes
- Fall date: 10:20 am local time (8:20 GMT) on July 14, 2006
- TKW: >4 kg
- Strewn field: Yes

Moss is a carbonaceous chondrite meteorite that fell over the communities of Rygge and Moss in Østfold county, southeast southern Norway in the morning of midsummer day, July 14, 2006.

The last time a type CO3 meteorite fell from the sky was in 1937 with Kainsaz, Russia. There are 6 known falls of a CO3 meteorite. Being of the rare carbonaceous subtype, 'meteorite man' Robert Haag stated to the media that this was the most important meteorite fall since the Canadian Tagish Lake fall in January 2000.

== History ==
=== Prelude ===
The summer of 2006 was the meteorite summer in Norway. The summer was very warm and dry. It was perfect weather to protect the valuable droppings that the skies let fall over Norway. It started in the beginning of June when on the 7th a very large meteor explosion was seen and heard over large areas in northernmost Norway. Although no meteorites was found from that event, its size stirred a whole world of meteorite aficionados and a stunned scientific community in Norway and abroad.

Then on the 10th of July it was announced on NRK1, Norway's number one TV channel, that a meteorite had been found in a man's driveway south of Stavanger. The story was soon denounced by the experts as being a plutonic rock from a nearby source.

But then, incredible as it was, just four days later the skies opened for a true meteorite fall event. This turned out to be the 13th find of a meteorite in Norway. At the same time its 9th fall.

As if this was not enough, at the end of August a very large fireball was seen north from Troms county to south of Bergen, almost along the whole coast of the country, but no meteorites were found.

=== Fall ===
At about 10:20 a.m. on the 14th of July a large meteor was seen in broad daylight by a large number of people heading north-northwest over Østfold county, Norway. It split into 4 or 5 smaller objects. It was seen from a large area extending outwards in all directions from the Oslofjord area, in north limited to roughly Lake Mjøsa, in east from Årjäng, Sweden, and in the southwest to the coast area of Sørlandet. Over Rygge and Moss a loud explosion and a rumbling sound was heard. A man near his summer cabin in Rygge saw and heard a small piece of stone hit an aluminium sheet about 2 meter away. This was the only directly observed impacting stone from the fall.

=== Finds ===
In all there were five separate finds of the Moss CO3.6 meteorite. They distributed over a strewnfield about 6 kilometres (3.7 mi) long from southeast in Rygge to northwest in parts of north Moss.

The largest find, the main mass, was in several tens of pieces, part of it being smashed while hitting a fence. It was almost 2 kilograms (4.4 lb) in weight. The total weight of all the finds was over 4 kilograms (8.8 lb).

== Classification and scientific studies ==
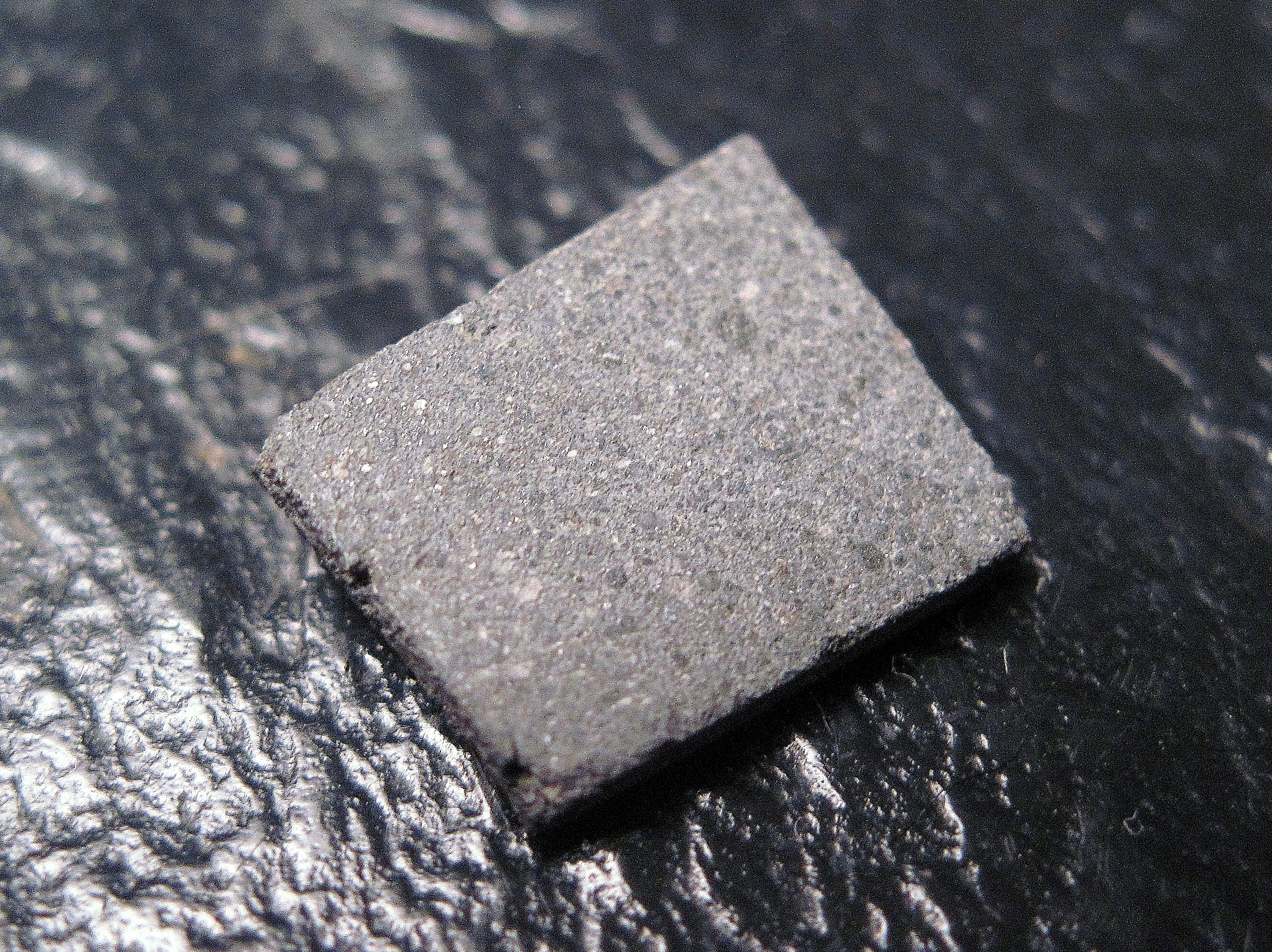
Moss slice

Several scientific papers have come out on the closer study of the meteorite. The first preliminary study of August 2006 showed that it contains numerous small chondrules, most <0.2mm and small <1mm amoeboid olivine aggregates (AOAs) and small CAIs (calcium aluminium inclusions). It also contains isolated grains of olivine, troilite and kamacite in a gray matrix.

It has been classified as carbonaceous chondrite of type CO3 - Ornans type. Its accepted designation is CO3.6. Its petrologic type 3.6 means that it is only slightly metamorphosed by heating from its original state, but more so than most of the 5 other CO3 falls. Its closest kin of these falls is Ornans, the group type specimen. It contains only about 0.25 percent carbon, some present as organic compounds. Typically benzene, toluene, C2-alkyl benzene and traces of biphenyl, benzonitrile and aliphatic hydrocarbones.

The shock stage is S2.

== See also ==
- Glossary of meteoritics
