= 2 Pallas =

Third-largest asteroid

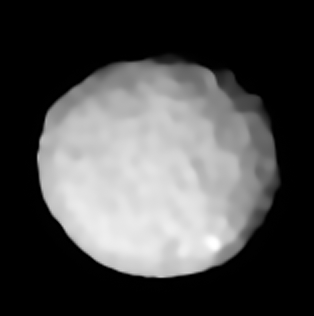
- VLT-SPHERE image of Pallas (Note: The craters covering Pallas, here only faintly discernible, are likely to look much sharper if the view were closer, as can be seen in this comparison of VLT and Dawn images of 4 Vesta.)

Discovery
- Discovered by: Heinrich Wilhelm Olbers
- Discovery date: 28 March 1802

Designations
- Pronunciation: /ˈpæləs/
- Named after: Pallas Athena
- Minor planet category: Asteroid belt (central); Pallas family
- Adjectives: Palladian /pæˈleɪdiən/ (trad.)
- Symbol: (historically astronomical, now astrological)

Orbital characteristics
- Epoch 13 September 2023 (JD 2453300.5)
- Uncertainty parameter 0
- Observation arc: 219 yr
- Aphelion: 3.41 AU (510 million km)
- Perihelion: 2.13 AU (319 million km)
- Semi-major axis: 2.77 AU (414 million km)
- Eccentricity: 0.2302
- Orbital period (sidereal): 4.611 yr (1,684.0 d)
- Mean anomaly: 40.6
- Mean motion: 0° 12^{m} 46.8^{s} / day
- Inclination: 34.93° (34.43° to invariable plane)
- Longitude of ascending node: 172.9°
- Time of perihelion: 16 October 2027
- Argument of perihelion: 310.9°
- Earth MOID: 1.2 AU (180 million km)

Proper orbital elements
- Proper semi-major axis: 2.7709176 AU
- Proper eccentricity: 0.2812580
- Proper inclination: 33.1988686°
- Proper mean motion: 78.041654 deg / yr
- Proper orbital period: 4.61292 yr (1684.869 d)
- Precession of perihelion long.: −1.335344 arcsec / yr
- Precession of asc. node: −46.393342 arcsec / yr

Physical characteristics
- Dimensions: (568 × 530 × 450) ± 12 km(568 × 532 × 448) ± 12 km(550 ± 8 × 516 ± 6 × 476 ± 6) km
- Mean diameter: 511±4 km 513±6 km 512±6 km
- Surface area: (8.3±0.2)×10^{5} km^{2} (Note: Calculated using the known dimensions assuming an ellipsoid.)
- Volume: (7.0±0.3)×10^{7} km^{3}
- Mass: (2.042±0.027)×10^{20} kg (Note: Composite estimate.) (2.04±0.03)×10^{20} kg (2.049±0.014)×10^{20} kg (Note: Calculated from its standard gravitational parameter GM = 13.678±0.093 km^{3}/s^{2}.)
- Mean density: 2.92±0.08 g/cm^{3} 2.89±0.08 g/cm^{3} 2.93±0.07 g/cm^{3} (Note: Assuming a diameter of 511 ± 4 km.)
- Equatorial surface gravity: 0.21 m/s^{2}
- Equatorial escape velocity: 324 m/s
- Synodic rotation period: 7.8132214±0.000002 h
- Equatorial rotation velocity: 65 m/s
- Axial tilt: 78°
- Pole ecliptic longitude: 42°±3°
- Pole ecliptic latitude: −15°±3°
- Geometric albedo: 0.12–0.17
- Spectral type: B
- Apparent magnitude: 6.49 to 10.65
- Absolute magnitude (H): 4.09; 4.12
- Angular diameter: 0.629″ to 0.171″ (Note: Calculated with JPL Horizons for 1608-Feb-15)

Pallas (minor-planet designation: 2 Pallas) is the third-largest asteroid in the Solar System by volume and mass. It is the second asteroid to have been discovered, after Ceres, and is likely a remnant protoplanet. Like Ceres, it is believed to have a mineral composition similar to carbonaceous chondrite meteorites, though significantly less hydrated than Ceres. It is 79% the mass of Vesta and 22% the mass of Ceres, constituting an estimated 7% of the total mass of the asteroid belt. Its estimated volume is equivalent to a sphere 507 to 515 kilometers (315 to 320 mi) in diameter, 90–95% the volume of Vesta.

During the planetary formation era of the Solar System, objects grew in size through an accretion process to approximately the size of Pallas. Most of these protoplanets were incorporated into the growth of larger bodies, which became the planets, whereas others were ejected by the planets or destroyed in collisions with each other. Pallas, Vesta and Ceres appear to be the only intact bodies from this early stage of planetary formation to survive within the orbit of Neptune.

When Pallas was discovered by the German astronomer Heinrich Wilhelm Matthias Olbers on 28 March 1802, it was considered to be a planet, as were other asteroids in the early 19th century. The discovery of many more asteroids after 1845 eventually led to the separate listing of "minor" planets from "major" planets, and the realization in the 1950s that such small bodies did not form in the same way as (other) planets led to the gradual abandonment of the term "minor planet" in favor of "asteroid" (or, for larger bodies such as Pallas, "planetoid").

With an orbital inclination of 34.8°, Pallas's orbit is unusually highly inclined to the plane of the asteroid belt, making Pallas relatively inaccessible to spacecraft, and its orbital eccentricity is nearly as large as that of Pluto.

The high inclination of the orbit of Pallas results in the possibility of close conjunctions to stars that other solar objects always pass at great angular distance. This resulted in Pallas passing Sirius on 9 October 2022, only 8.5 arcminutes southwards, while no planet can get closer than 30 degrees to Sirius.

== History ==
Size comparison: the first 10 asteroids profiled against the Moon. Pallas is number two.

=== Discovery ===
On the night of 5 April 1779, Charles Messier recorded Pallas on a star chart he used to track the path of a comet, now known as C/1779 A1 (Bode), that he observed in the spring of 1779, but apparently assumed it was nothing more than a star.

In 1801, the astronomer Giuseppe Piazzi discovered an object which he initially believed to be a comet. Shortly thereafter he announced his observations of this object, noting that the slow, uniform motion was uncharacteristic of a comet, suggesting it was a different type of object. This was lost from sight for several months, but was recovered later that year by the Baron von Zach and Heinrich W. M. Olbers after a preliminary orbit was computed by Carl Friedrich Gauss. This object came to be named Ceres, and was the first asteroid to be discovered.

A few months later, Olbers was again attempting to locate Ceres when he noticed another moving object in the vicinity. This was the asteroid Pallas, coincidentally passing near Ceres at the time. The discovery of this object created interest in the astronomy community. Before this point it had been speculated by astronomers that there should be a planet in the gap between Mars and Jupiter. Now, unexpectedly, a second such body had been found. When Pallas was discovered, some estimates of its size were as high as 3,380 km in diameter. Even as recently as 1979, Pallas was estimated to be 673 km in diameter, 26% greater than the currently accepted value.

The orbit of Pallas was determined by Gauss, who found the period of 4.6 years was similar to the period for Ceres. Pallas has a relatively high orbital inclination to the plane of the ecliptic.

=== Later observations ===
In 1917, the Japanese astronomer Kiyotsugu Hirayama began to study asteroid motions. By plotting the mean orbital motion, inclination, and eccentricity of a set of asteroids, he discovered several distinct groupings. In a later paper he reported a group of three asteroids associated with Pallas, which became named the Pallas family, after the largest member of the group. Since 1994 more than 10 members of this family have been identified, with semi-major axes between 2.50 and 2.82 AU and inclinations of 33–38°. The validity of the family was confirmed in 2002 by a comparison of their spectra.

Pallas has been observed occulting stars several times, including the best-observed of all asteroid occultation events, by 140 observers on 29 May 1983. These measurements resulted in the first accurate calculation of its diameter. After an occultation on 29 May 1979, the discovery of a possible tiny satellite with a diameter of about 1 km was reported, which was never confirmed.

Radio signals from spacecraft in orbit around Mars and/or on its surface have been used to estimate the mass of Pallas from the tiny perturbations induced by it onto the motion of Mars.

The Dawn team was granted viewing time on the Hubble Space Telescope in September 2007 for a once-in-twenty-year opportunity to view Pallas at closest approach, to obtain comparative data for Ceres and Vesta.

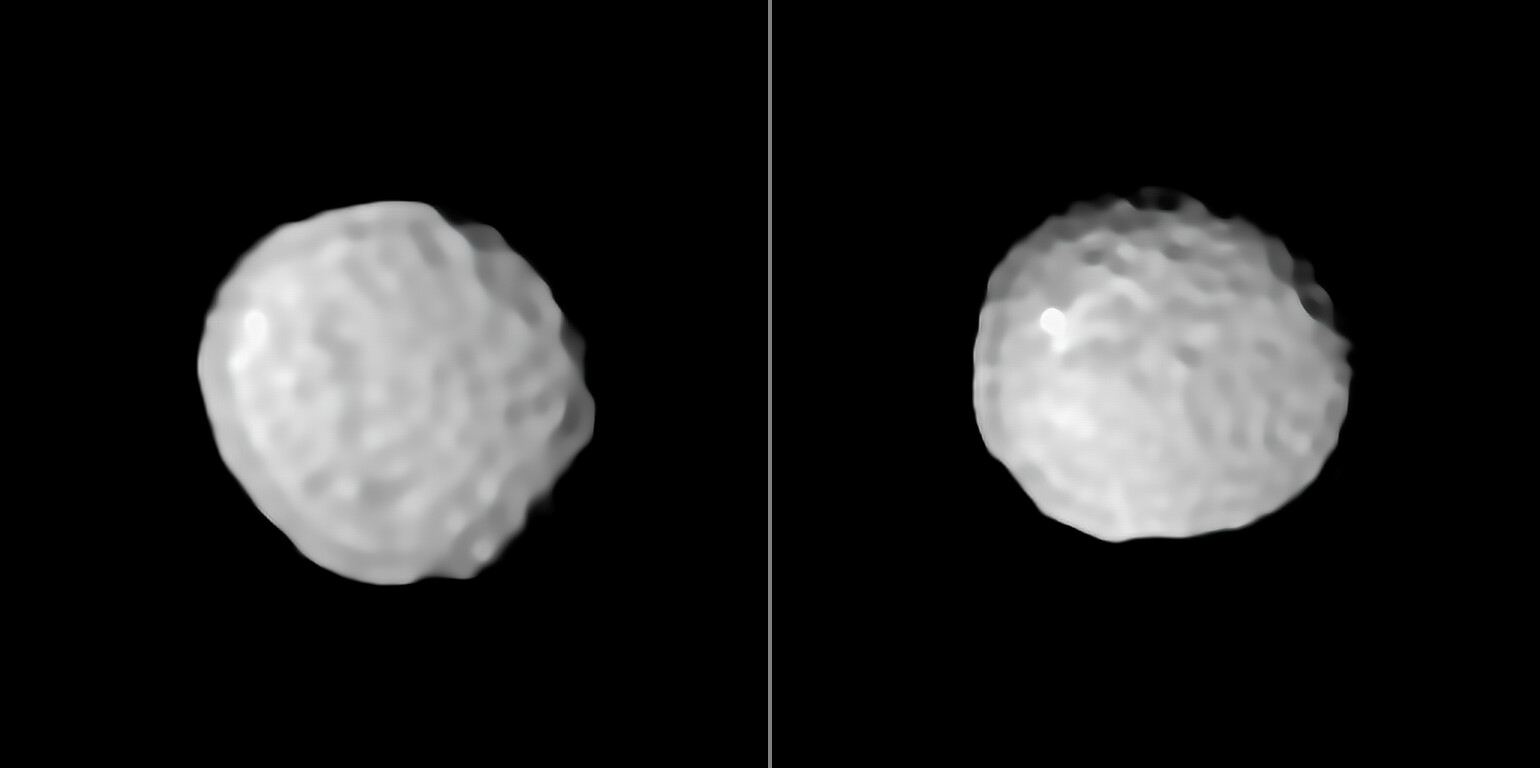
High-resolution images of the north (at left) and south (at right) hemispheres of Pallas, made possible by the Adaptive-Optics (AO)-fed SPHERE imager on the Very Large Telescope (VLT) in 2020. Two large impact basins could have been created by Palladian asteroid–forming impacts. The bright spot in the southern hemisphere is reminiscent of the salt deposits on Ceres.

=== Name and symbol ===
The symbols for Ceres and Pallas, as published in 1802

Pallas is an epithet of the Greek goddess Athena (Ancient Greek: Παλλάς Ἀθηνᾶ). In some versions of the myth, Athena accidentally killed Pallas, daughter of Triton, then adopted her friend's name out of mourning.

The adjectival form of the name is Palladian. The d is part of the oblique stem of the Greek name, which appears before a vowel but disappears before the nominative ending -s. The oblique form is seen in the Italian and Russian names for the asteroid, Pallade and Паллада (Pallada). (Note: The one exception internationally to the use of the Greek stem for the name of the asteroid is Chinese, in which it is known as 智神星 (Zhìshénxīng), the 'wisdom-god star'.) The stony-iron pallasite meteorites are not Palladian, being named instead after the German naturalist Peter Simon Pallas. The chemical element palladium, on the other hand, was named after the asteroid, which had been discovered just before the element.

The old astronomical symbol of Pallas, still used in astrology, is a spear or lance, ⟨⟩, one of the symbols of the goddess. The blade was most often a lozenge (◊), but various graphic variants were published, including an acute/elliptic leaf shape, a cordate leaf shape (♤:), and a triangle (△); the last made it effectively the alchemical symbol for sulfur, ⟨⟩. The generic asteroid symbol of a disk with its discovery number, ⟨②⟩, was introduced in 1852 and quickly became the norm. The iconic lozenge symbol was resurrected for astrological use in 1973.

== Orbit and rotation ==
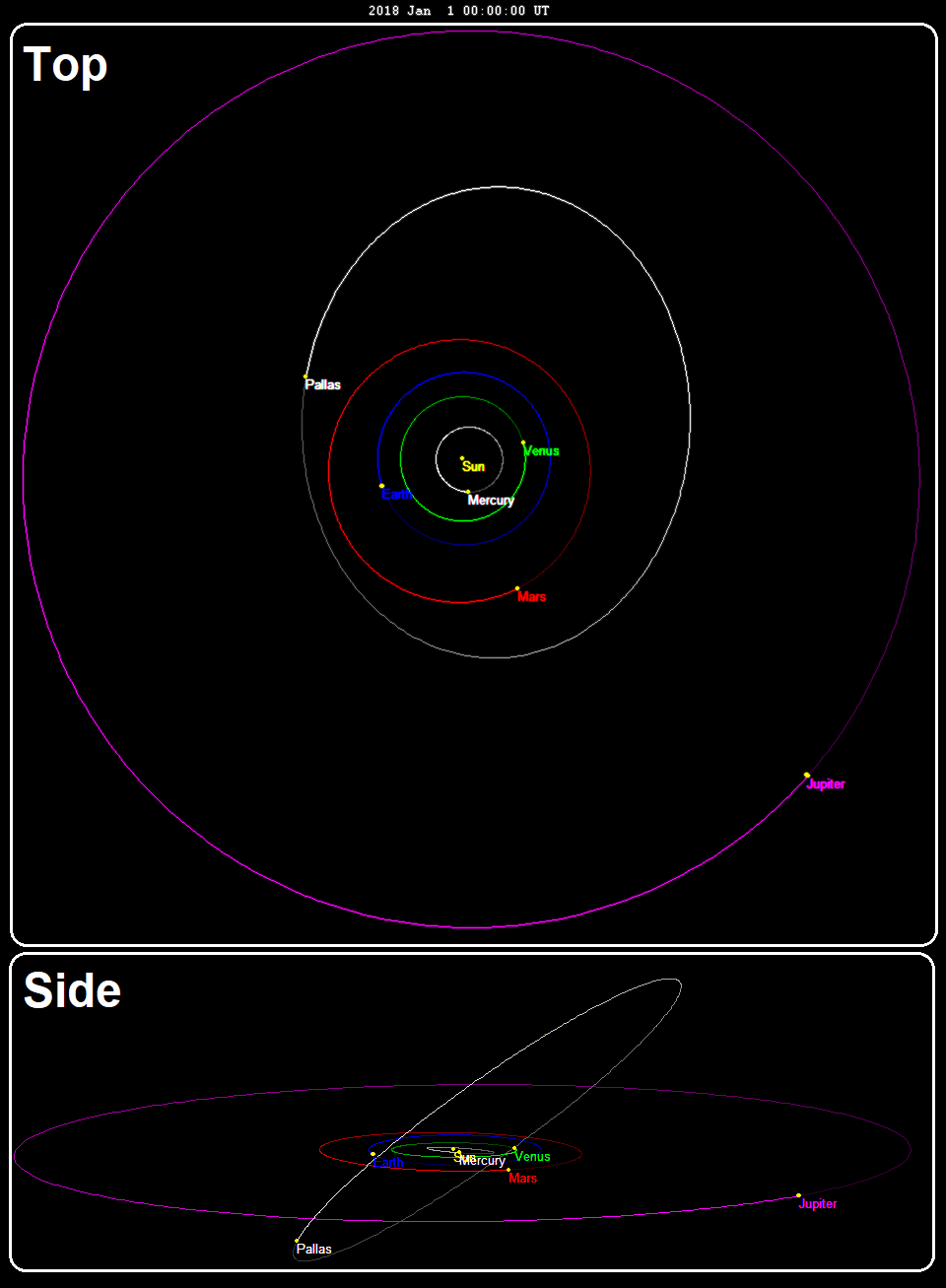
Pallas has a high eccentricity and a highly inclined orbit

Pallas has unusual dynamic parameters for such a large body. Its orbit is highly inclined and moderately eccentric, despite being at the same distance from the Sun as the central part of the asteroid belt. Furthermore, Pallas has a very high axial tilt of 78°, with its north pole pointing towards ecliptic coordinates (λ, β) = (42°, −15°) with a 3° uncertainty in the Ecliptic J2000.0 reference frame. This means that every Palladian summer and winter, large parts of the surface are in constant sunlight or constant darkness for a time on the order of an Earth year, with areas near the poles experiencing continuous sunlight for as long as two years.

=== Near resonances ===
Pallas is in a near-1:1 orbital resonance with Ceres, which is probably coincidental. Pallas also has a near-18:7 resonance (91,000-year period) and an approximate 5:2 resonance (83-year period) with Jupiter.

Animation of the Palladian orbit in the inner Solar System
- Pallas
- Ceres
- Jupiter
- Mars
- Earth
- Sun

An animation of Pallas's near-18:7 resonance with Jupiter. The orbit of Pallas is green when above the ecliptic and red when below. It only marches clockwise: it never halts or reverses course (i.e. no libration). The motion of Pallas is shown in a reference frame that rotates about the Sun (the center dot) with a period equal to Jupiter's orbital period. Accordingly, Jupiter's orbit appears almost stationary as the pink ellipse at top left. Mars's motion is orange, and the Earth–Moon system is blue and white.

=== Transits of planets from Pallas ===
From Pallas, the planets Mercury, Venus, Mars, and Earth can occasionally appear to transit, or pass in front of, the Sun. Earth last did so in 1968 and 1998, and will next transit in 2224. Mercury did in October 2009. The last and next by Venus are in 1677 and 2123, and for Mars they are in 1597 and 2759.

== Physical characteristics ==
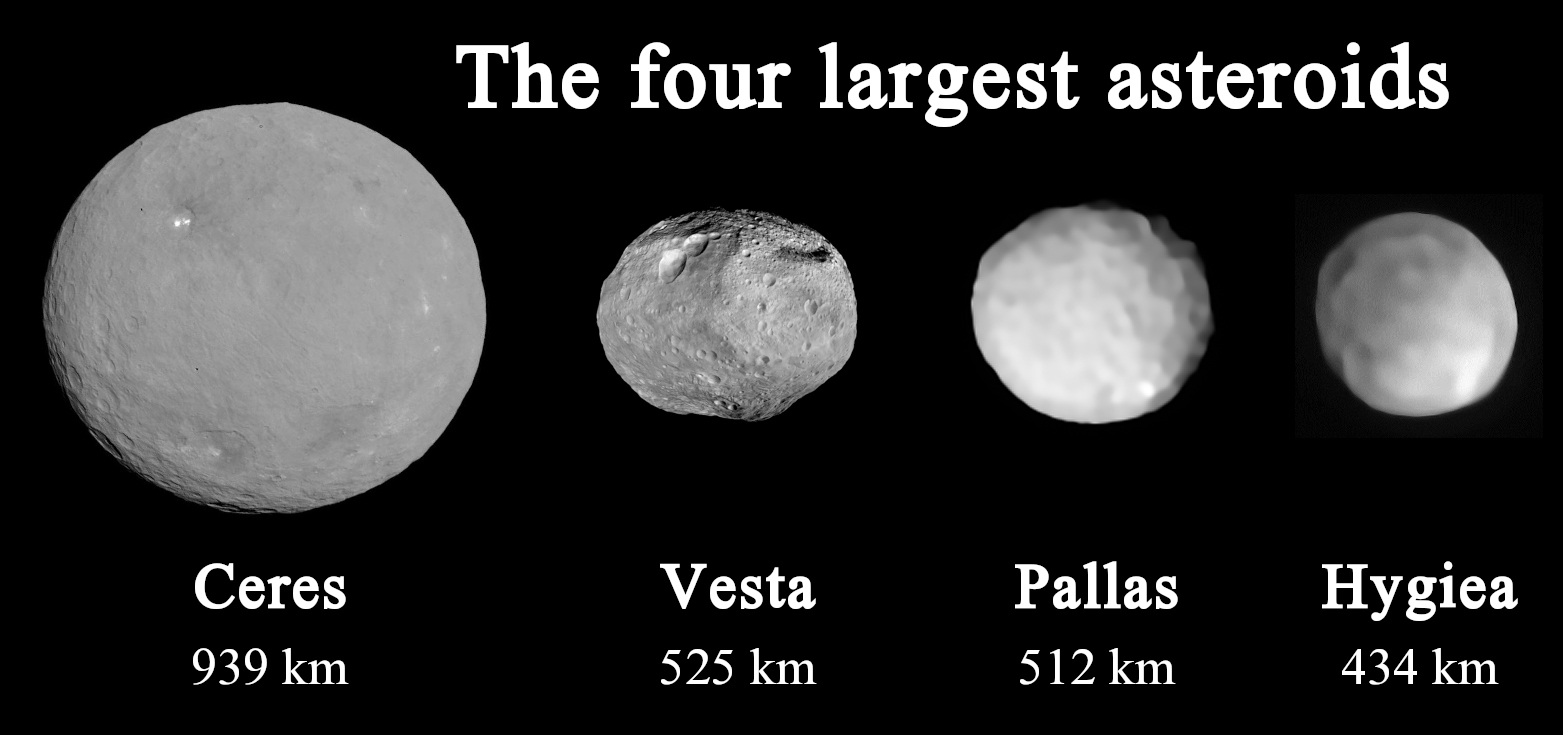
Relative sizes of the four largest asteroids. Pallas is second from right.

The mass of 2 Pallas (dark green) compared to other large asteroids and the remainder of the Main Belt. The unit of mass is×10^{18} kg.
1. 2 Pallas 204 (8.52%)
2. 4 Vesta 259 (10.8%)
3. 10 Hygiea 87 (3.63%)
4. 704 Interamnia 35 (1.46%)
5. 15 Eunomia 30 (1.25%)
6. other ≈ 841 (35.1%)
7. 1 Ceres 938 (39.2%)

Both Vesta and Pallas have assumed the title of second-largest asteroid from time to time. At 513±3 km in diameter, Pallas is now understood to be slightly smaller than Vesta (525.4±0.2 km). The mass of Pallas is 79%±1% that of Vesta, 22% that of Ceres, and 0.25% that of the Moon.

Pallas is farther from Earth and has a much lower albedo than Vesta, and hence is dimmer as seen from Earth. Indeed, the much smaller asteroid 7 Iris marginally exceeds Pallas in mean opposition magnitude. Pallas's mean opposition magnitude is +8.0, which is well within the range of 10×50 binoculars, but, unlike Ceres and Vesta, it will require more-powerful optical aid to view at small elongations, when its magnitude can drop as low as +10.6. During rare perihelic oppositions, Pallas can reach a magnitude of +6.4, right on the edge of naked-eye visibility. During late February 2014 Pallas shone with magnitude 6.96. (Note: Calculated with JPL Horizons for 2014-Feb-24)

Pallas is a B-type asteroid. Based on spectroscopic observations, the primary component of the material on Pallas's surface is a silicate containing little iron and water. Minerals of this type include olivine and pyroxene, which are found in CM chondrules. The surface composition of Pallas is very similar to the Renazzo carbonaceous chondrite (CR) meteorites, which are even lower in hydrous minerals than the CM type. The Renazzo meteorite was discovered in Italy in 1824 and is one of the most primitive meteorites known. (Note: Marsset 2020 finds it closer to CM meteorites) Pallas's visible and near-infrared spectrum is almost flat, being slightly brighter in towards the blue. There is only one clear absorption band in the 3-micron part, which suggests an anhydrous component mixed with hydrated CM-like silicates.

Pallas's surface is most likely composed of a silicate material; its spectrum and calculated density (2.89±0.08 g/cm^{3}) correspond to CM chondrite meteorites (2.90±0.08 g/cm^{3}), suggesting a mineral composition similar to that of Ceres, but significantly less hydrated.

To within observational limits, Pallas appears to be saturated with craters. Its high inclination and eccentricity means that average impacts are much more energetic than on Vesta or Ceres (with on average twice their velocity), meaning that smaller (and thus more common) impactors can create equivalently sized craters. Indeed, Pallas appears to have many more large craters than either Vesta or Ceres, with craters larger than 40 km covering at least 9% of its surface.

Pallas's shape departs significantly from the dimensions of an equilibrium body at its current rotational period, indicating that it is not in hydrostatic equilibrium, and thus does not meet the definition of a dwarf planet. It is possible that a suspected large impact basin at the south pole, which ejected 6%±1% of the volume of Pallas (twice the volume of the Rheasilvia basin on Vesta), may have increased its inclination and slowed its rotation; the shape of Pallas without such a basin would be close to an equilibrium shape for a 6.2-hour rotational period. A smaller crater near the equator is associated with the Palladian family of asteroids.

Pallas probably has a quite homogeneous interior. The close match between Pallas and CM chondrites suggests that they formed in the same era and that the interior of Pallas never reached the temperature (≈820 K) needed to dehydrate silicates, which would be necessary to differentiate a dry silicate core beneath a hydrated mantle. Thus Pallas should be rather homogeneous in composition, though some upward flow of water could have occurred since. Such a migration of water to the surface would have left salt deposits, potentially explaining Pallas's relatively high albedo. Indeed, one bright spot is reminiscent of those found on Ceres. Although other explanations for the bright spot are possible (e.g. a recent ejecta blanket), if the near-Earth asteroid 3200 Phaethon is an ejected piece of Pallas, as some have theorized, then a Palladian surface enriched in salts would explain the sodium abundance in the Geminid meteor shower caused by Phaethon.

=== Surface features ===
Besides one bright spot in the southern hemisphere, the only surface features identified on Pallas are craters. As of 2020, 36 craters have been identified, 34 of which are larger than 40 km in diameter. Provisional names have been provided for some of them. The craters are named after ancient weapons.

Features on Pallas (southern hemisphere)
Feature	Pronunciation	Latin or Greek	Meaning
Akontia	/əˈkɒntiə/	ἀκόντιον	a dart
Doru	/ˈdoʊruː/	δόρυ	a spear
Hoplon	/ˈhɒplɒn/	ὅπλον	a weapon (esp. a large shield)
Kopis	/ˈkoʊpɪs/	κοπίς	a chopping sword
Sarissa	/səˈrɪsə/	σάρισσα	a pike
Sfendonai	/ˈsfɛndəneɪ/	σφενδόνη	a slingstone
Toxa	/ˈtɒksə/	τόξον	a bow
Xiphos	/ˈzaɪfɒs/	ξίφος	a sword
Xyston	/ˈzɪstɒn/	ξυστόν	a lance

Features on Pallas (northern hemisphere)
Feature	Pronunciation	Latin or Greek	Meaning
Aklys	/ˈeɪklɪs/	āclys	a small javelin attached to a strap
Falcata	/fælˈkeɪtə/	falcāta	a sword of pre-Roman Iberia
Makhaira	/məˈkeɪrə/	μάχαιρα	a sword of ancient Greece
Pilum	/ˈpaɪləm/	pīlum	a Roman javelin
Scutum	/ˈskjuːtəm/	scūtum	a Roman leather-covered shield
Sica	/ˈsaɪkə/	sīca	a dagger
Spatha	/ˈspeɪθə/	spatha	a straight sword

== Satellites ==
A small moon about 1 kilometer in diameter was suggested based on occultation data from 29 May 1978. In 1980, speckle interferometry suggested a much larger satellite, whose existence was refuted a few years later with occultation data.

== Exploration ==
Pallas itself has never been visited by spacecraft. Proposals have been made in the past though none have come to fruition. A flyby of the Dawn probe's visits to 4 Vesta and 1 Ceres was discussed but was not possible due to the high orbital inclination of Pallas. The proposed Athena SmallSat mission would have been launched in 2022 as a secondary payload of the Psyche mission and travel on separate trajectory to a flyby encounter with 2 Pallas, though was not funded due to being outcompeted by other mission concepts such as the TransOrbital Trailblazer Lunar Orbiter. The authors of the proposal cited Pallas as the "largest unexplored" main-belt protoplanet.

== Gallery ==
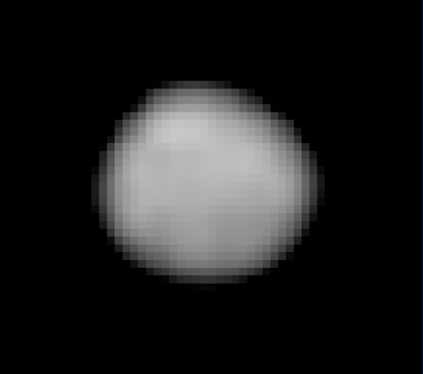
An ultraviolet image of Pallas showing its flattened shape, taken by the Hubble Space Telescope in 2007

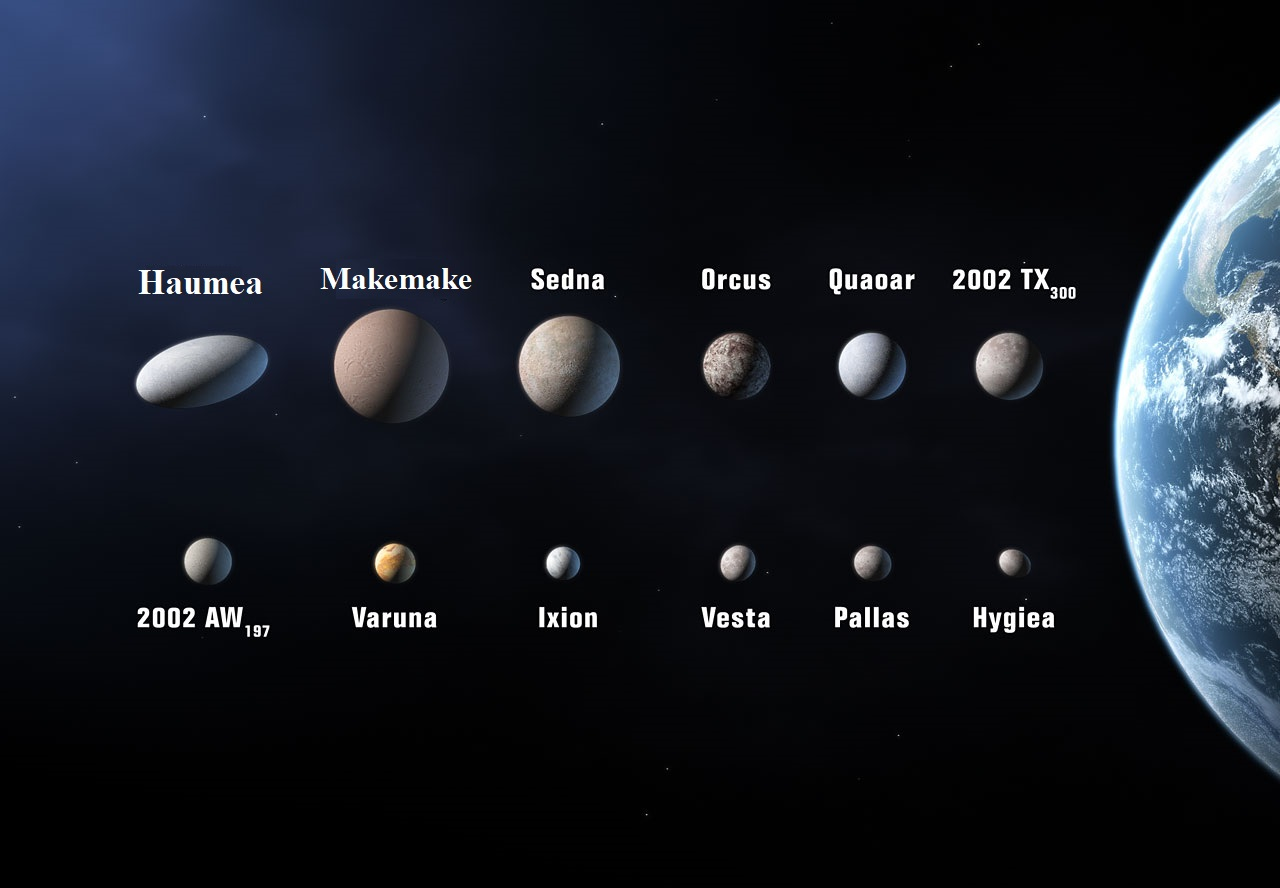
Objects considered for dwarf planet status under the IAU's 2006 draft proposal on the definition of a planet. Pallas is second from the right, bottom row.

== See also ==
- 881 Athene, another asteroid named after Athena
- Pallas family
- List of former planets
