= Jbilet Winselwan meteorite =

Meteorite found in Western Sahara

Jbilet Winselwan
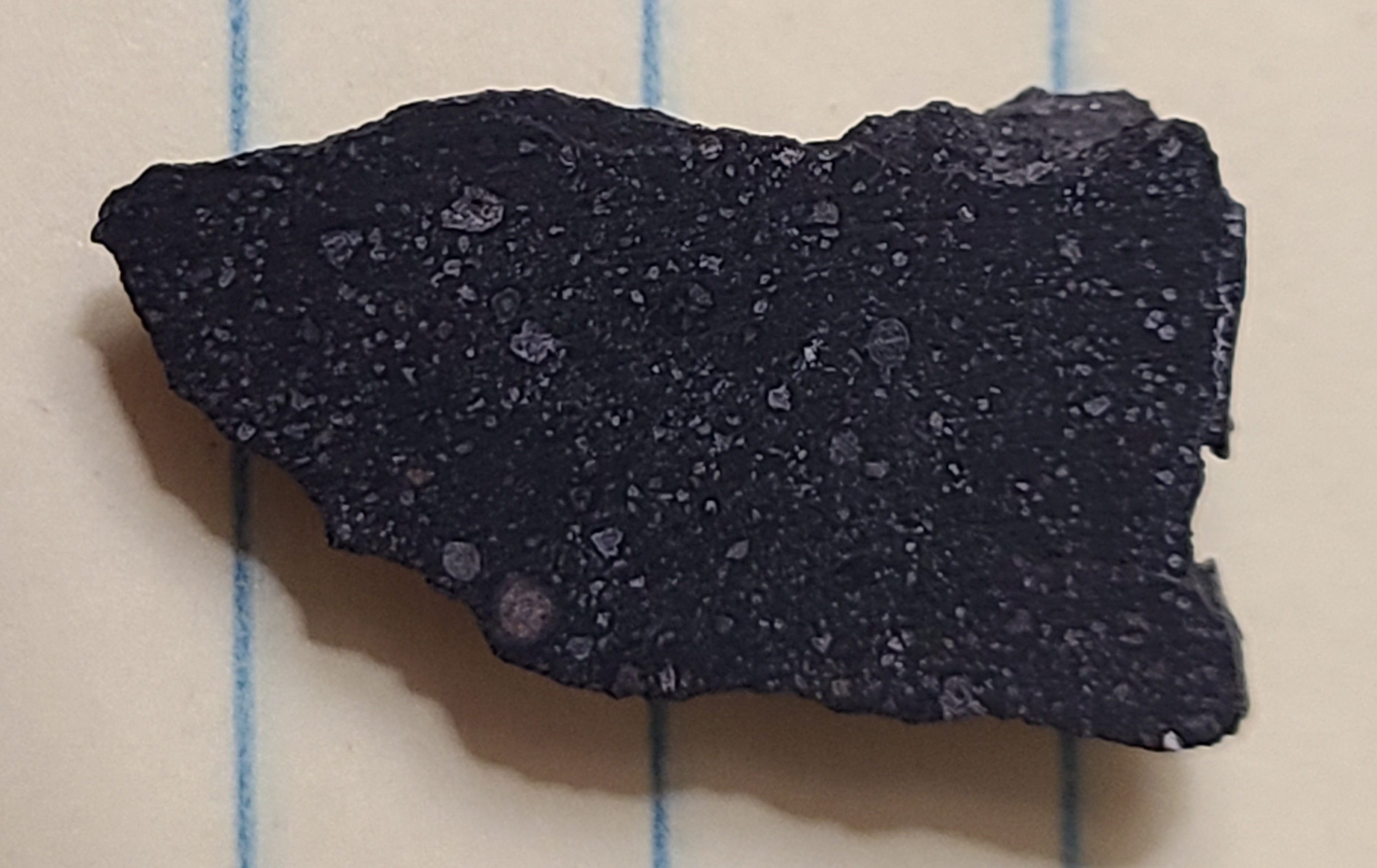
- Type: Chondrite
- Class: Carbonaceous chondrite
- Group: CM2
- Shock stage: S1
- Weathering grade: W1
- Country: Western Sahara
- Region: Northwest Africa
- Coordinates: 20°40′3″N 11°40′38″W
- Observed fall: No
- Found date: 24 May 2013
- TKW: 6 kilograms (13 lb)
- Strewn field: Yes
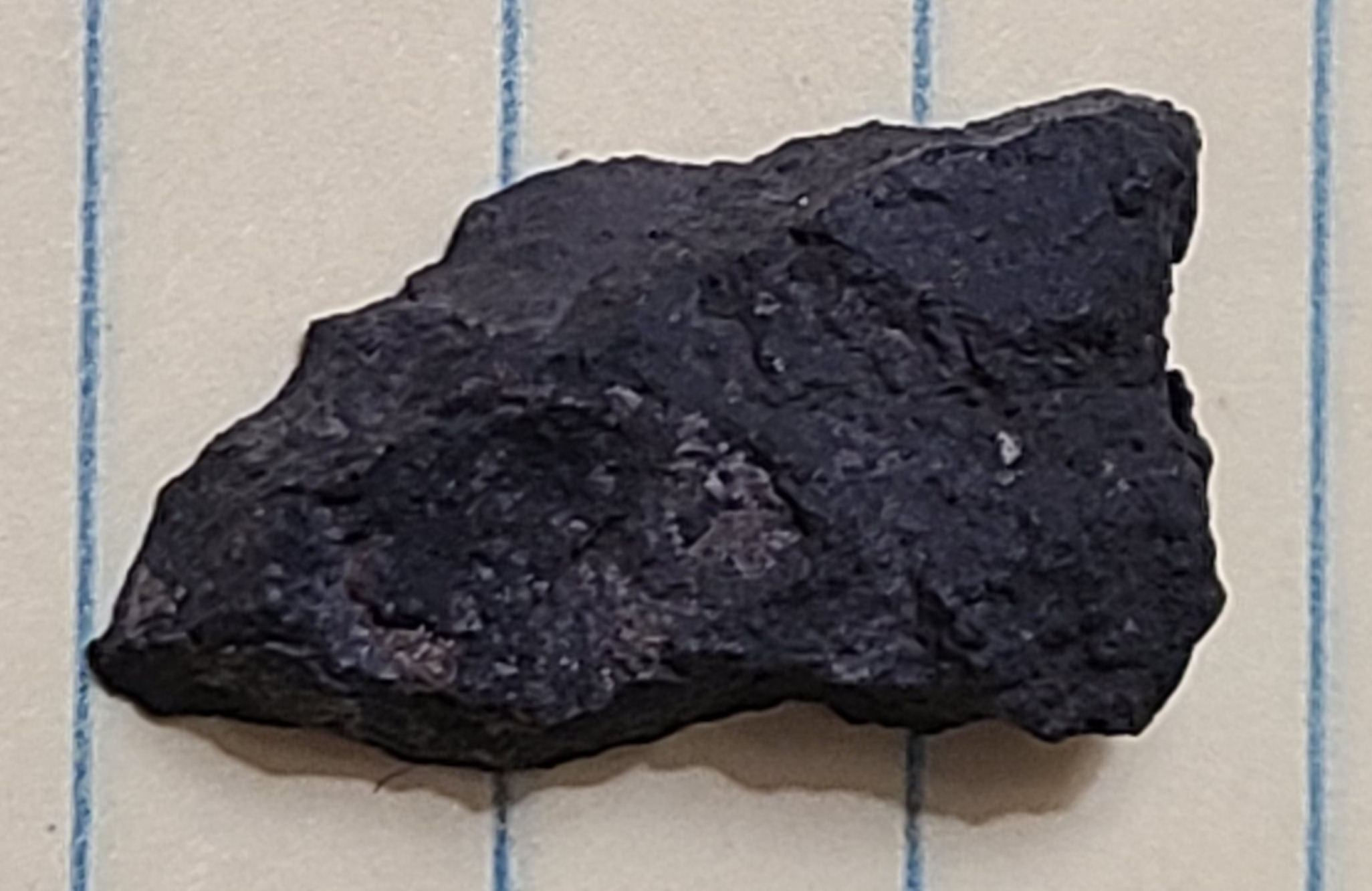

The Jbilet Winselwan meteorite is a CM-type carbonaceous chondrite found in Western Sahara in 2013.

It is notable for having a low shock stage and weathering grade with a large total known weight. Thus, it provides a large amount of relatively pristine material without the cost premium associated with meteorite falls.

Jbilet Winselwan has been identified as a good analog for C-type asteroid sample return missions, such as Hayabusa2. Further study has also indicated that it represents a unique view of C-type asteroid regolith based on micro-scale dehydration textures found throughout the meteorite.

== History ==
Jbilet Winselwan was reported in early June 2013 by a meteorite hunter from Smara, Western Sahara. Due to inherent delays in communication from the desert, the official find date is earlier than the initial reports. The accessibility of the strewn field, located only 7 miles of Smara, attracted a large number of meteorite hunters beginning in the summer of 2013. The majority of specimens range from 3 to 200 grams with a few larger samples; the largest being approximately 900g. Samples reached the market quickly and the official classification was approved by The Meteoritical Society on August 12, 2013.

== Classification and composition ==
Jbilet Winselwan was classified as CM-type carbonaceous chondrite at The National Museum of Natural History, France, and The University of Hassan II Casablanca based on its oxygen-isotopic composition, petrography, and mineral compositions. The meteorite contains CAIs and both type I and type II chondrules ranging up to 1.2mm, with the majority around 200 μm. X-ray diffraction used in classification showed strong peaks for serpentines, broad but weaker peaks for smectites, and a weak broad peak for tochilinite. Major silicate compositions are olivine (Fa_{0.98±0.44} and Fa_{25-40}) and pyroxene (Fs_{2.6±1.5} and Fs_{40-61}). Rare kamacite with 5.8 wt% Ni was identified. The oxygen isotopic compositions were measured for two fragments for identification, at δ^{18}O 3.811±0.09 and 5.851±0.016, δ^{17}O -2.446±0.040 and -0.601±0.026, respectively. The isotope values plot well inside the CM chondrite region.

== Further study ==
Due to its pristine condition and relative ease to obtain, Jbilet Winselwan has been extensively studied for a northwest Africa find. The earliest studies identified its extreme degree of brecciation, indicating that it likely represents the outermost portion of its parent asteroid; the regolith. This regolith context has been of particular interest, as two missions are currently underway to collect asteroid regolith, Hayabusa2 and OSIRIS-REx. Jbilet Winselwan has specifically been identified as an analog for Hayabusa2, as the mission is targeting a C-type asteroid, the same class as its likely parent body. In this context, the meteorite was further characterized in its major and minor elements, alteration textures, hydrocarbons, and thermal metamorphism.

The extremely brecciated characteristics of Jbilet Winselwan have also made it valuable for studying of the thermal and hydration history of its parent body. A single thin section will contain multiple lithologies ranging from typically-hydrated CM chondrite material with tightly packed chondrules to significantly more dehydrated material with few, poorly preserved chondrules. It has been suggested that some Jbilet Winselwan lithologies represent prime examples of post-shock aqueous alteration, including some regions which have formed as a result of cyclical events.
