= Cronstedtite =

Phyllosilicate mineral in the serpentine subgroup

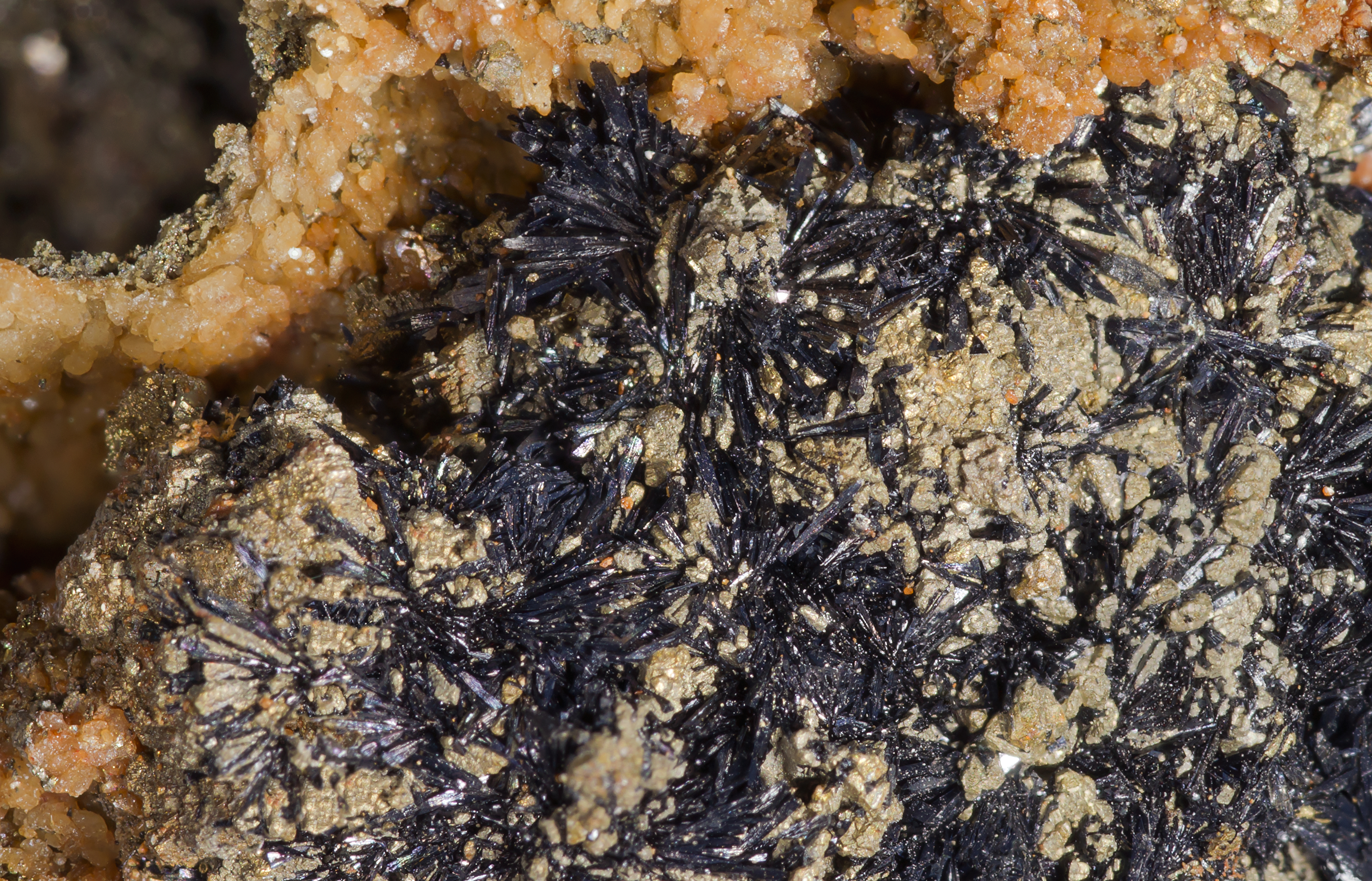
- Cronstedtite – Salsigne Mine – France

General
- Category: Phyllosilicate minerals
- Group: Kaolinite-Serpentine group, serpentine subgroup
- Formula: Fe^{2+}_{2}Fe^{3+}(Si,Fe^{3+}O_{5})(OH)_{4}
- IMA symbol: Cro
- Strunz classification: 9.ED.15
- Crystal system: Trigonal
- Crystal class: Ditrigonal pyramidal (3 m) (same H-M symbol)
- Space group: P31m (no. 157)
- Unit cell: a = 5.486 Å, c = 7.095 Å; Z = 1

Identification
- Color: Black, dark brown-black, green-black
- Cleavage: Perfect on {001}
- Tenacity: Elastic
- Luster: Sub-Metallic
- Streak: Dark olive green
- Diaphaneity: Translucent
- Specific gravity: 3.34 – 3.35
- Optical properties: Biaxial (−)
- Refractive index: n_{α} = 1.720 n_{β} = 1.800 n_{γ} = 1.800
- Birefringence: δ = 0.080
- Pleochroism: Visible
- Dispersion: r < v moderate

Cronstedtite is a complex iron silicate mineral belonging to the serpentine group of minerals. Its chemical formula is Fe^{2+}_{2}Fe^{3+}(Si,Fe^{3+}O_{5})(OH)_{4}.

It was discovered in 1821 and named in honor of Swedish mineralogist Axel Fredrik Cronstedt (1722–1765). It has been found in Bohemia in the Czech Republic and in Cornwall, England.

Cronstedtite is a major constituent of CM chondrites, a carbonaceous chondrite group exhibiting varying degrees of aqueous alteration. Cronstedtite abundance decreases with increasing alteration.

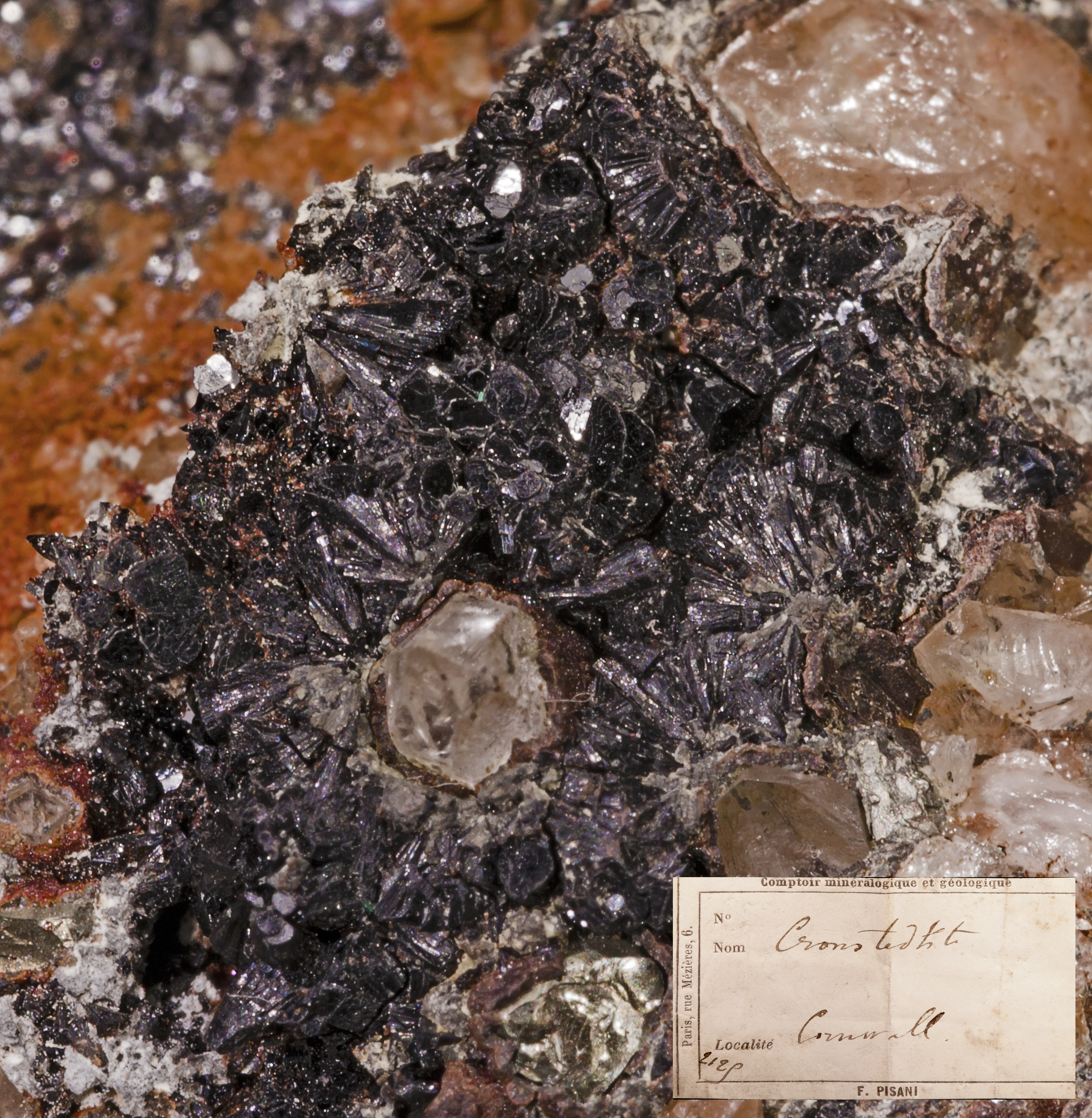
Cronstedtite – Cornwall, England

== See also ==
- List of minerals
- List of minerals named after people
