= Kainsaz meteorite =

Meteorite found in Russia

Kainsaz
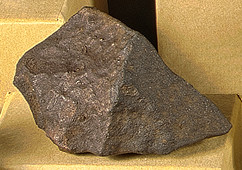
- Type: Chondrite
- Class: Carbonaceous chondrite
- Clan: CM-CO
- Group: CO3.2
- Subgroup: 3
- Shock stage: 2
- Country: Russia
- Region: Kainsaz, Muslyumovo, Tatarstan
- Coordinates: 55°26′N 53°15′E
- Observed fall: Yes
- Fall date: 1937-09-13
- TKW: 200 kilograms (440 lb)
- Strewn field: Yes
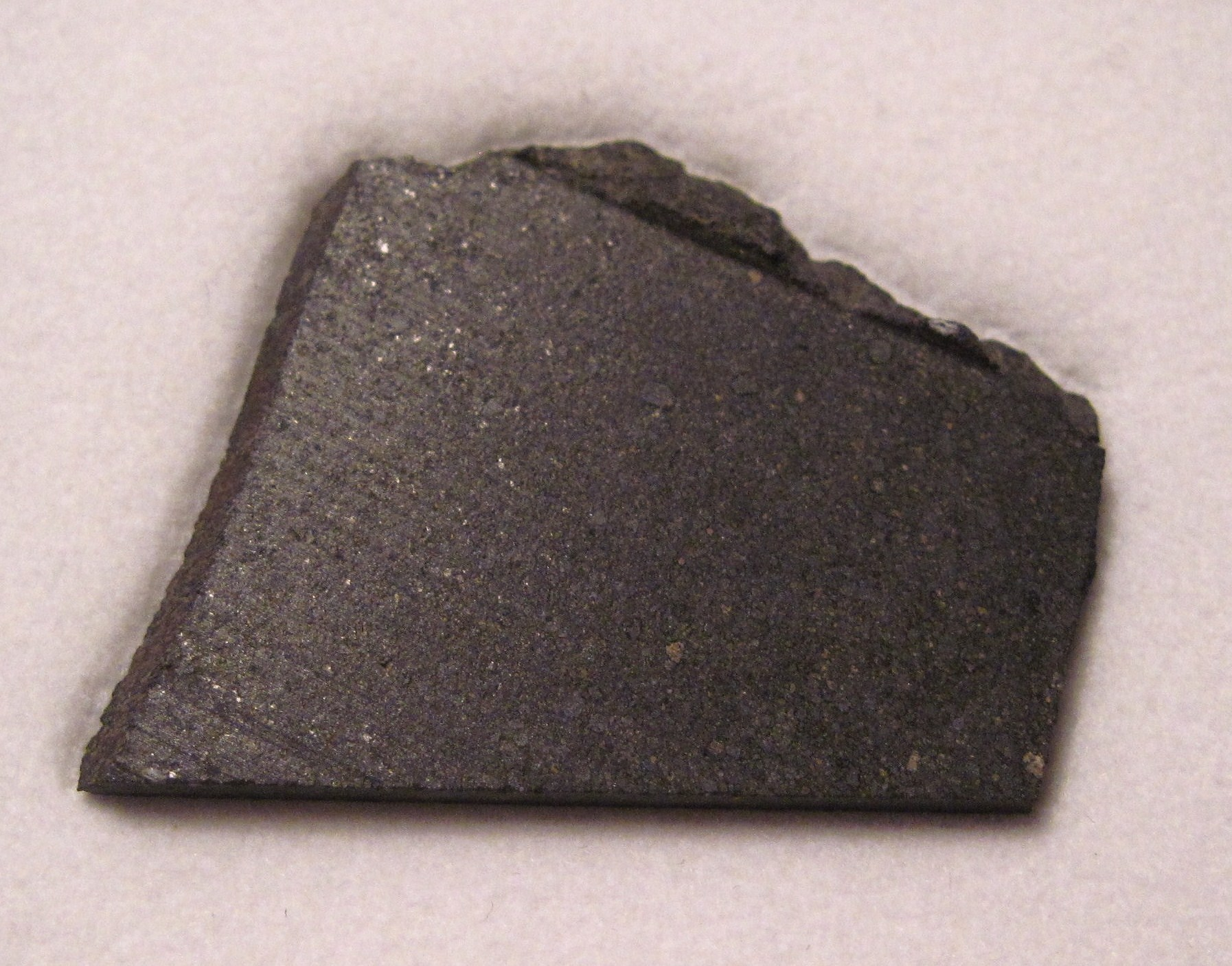
- This partial slice has fusion crust along 2 edges and weighs 4.04 grams (0.143 oz).
- Related media on Wikimedia Commons

Fifteen pieces of the Kainsaz meteorite were seen to fall near Kainsaz, Muslyumovo, Tatarstan in the Russian SFSR on September 13, 1937. The largest weighed 102.5 kilograms (226 lb), the total weight was ~200 kilograms (440 lb). As of January 2013 pieces were on sale for ~US$100/g. Kainsaz is the only observed fall in Tatarstan.

== History ==
A fireball was observed which left a dust train and broke into fragments during flight in a series of detonations that were heard up to 130 kilometres (81 mi) away. The strewn field of 40 by 7 kilometres (24.9 mi × 4.3 mi) was oriented SE-NW with the largest stone falling at the NW end, the smallest (the size of a nut) near the village of Kosteevo at the SE end.

== Mineralogy ==
Most of the chondrules (90 %) are either droplet (39 %) or lithic (61 %). The remaining 10 % are barred olivine, radial pyroxene, cryptocrystalline, glassy, sulfide-metal, micro-poikilitic and complex chondrules.

== Classification ==
Kainsaz is classified as a CO3.2. This stands for CO group, petrologic type = 3, and subtype = 2. The group is part of the CM-CO clan and a member of the carbonaceous chondrites.

== See also ==
- Glossary of meteoritics
