= Winchcombe meteorite =

Meteorite that hit England in 2021

Winchcombe
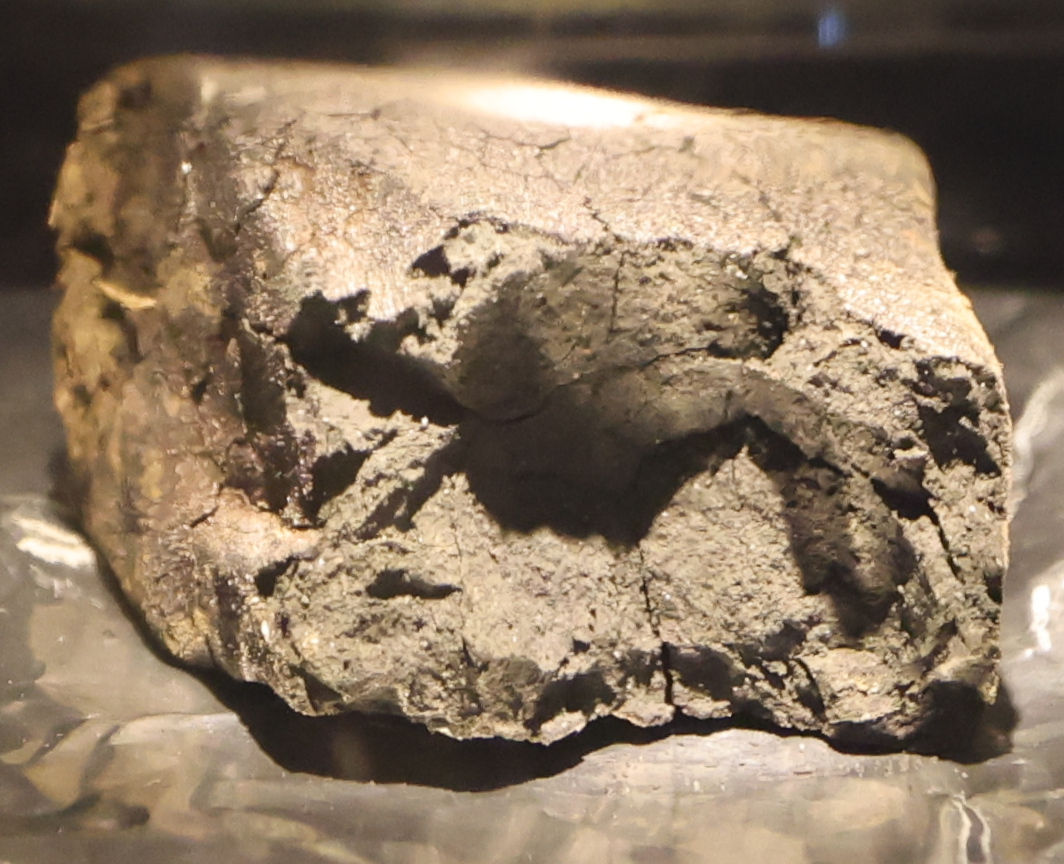
- Fragment of the Winchcombe meteorite in the Natural History Museum, London
- Type: Chondrite
- Class: Carbonaceous chondrite
- Group: CM2
- Country: England
- Region: Gloucestershire
- Coordinates: 51.9512°N 1.9755°W
- Observed fall: Yes
- Fall date: 28 Feb 2021 GMT (UTC)
- Found date: 28 Feb – 1 Mar 2021 GMT (UTC)
- TKW: 602 grams (21.2 oz)
- Related media on Wikimedia Commons

The Winchcombe meteorite is a carbonaceous chondrite meteorite that was observed entering the Earth's atmosphere as a fluorescent green fireball over Gloucestershire, England, at 21:54 on 28 February 2021. Due to a public appeal, fragments were quickly recovered from the village of Winchcombe, enabling it to be collected for analysis before becoming degraded.

It is a 4.6 billion-year-old meteorite originating from the asteroid belt between Mars and Jupiter.

It was the first meteorite found in Britain since 1991. Fragments of the meteorite were displayed at the London Natural History Museum on 17 May 2021.

== Observation ==
Images of the meteoroid falling to Earth were captured by six camera networks of the UK Fireball Alliance, which is led by the Natural History Museum, as well as on the doorbell cameras of private dwellings. There were also over 1,000 eyewitness reports from the UK and elsewhere in Northern Europe, as well as a sonic boom heard in the local area. These observations allowed its trajectory to be reconstructed. A public appeal was issued for fragments.

== Recovery ==
Subsequently, the Wilcock family found a pile of dark stones and powder on the driveway of their home in Winchcombe. They had heard a sound at the time when the meteorite hit but did not investigate outside until the morning; upon discovering the fragments, they placed them in a bag and these were taken to London for analysis. In total 319 grams (11.3 oz) of material was collected from their driveway and lawn.

In the following days further fragments were found nearby, including the largest single stone from the meteorite found on farmland and weighing 152 grams (5.4 oz), but this split in two during recovery.

On 21 March 2021, meteorite hunter Chris Casey found a 12-gram (0.42 oz) half stone on a grass verge in Woodmancote. This was followed by another find of 17.5 grams (0.62 oz) on 23 March 2021 in Bishop's Cleeve. On 25 March 2021, Casey and Luther Jackson found a 19.2-gram (0.68 oz) stone in Bishop's Cleeve and on 1 April 2021, Jackson, while hunting with Casey and Graham Ensor, found a fragmented 5.2-gram (0.18 oz) stone on a Bishop's Cleeve footpath.

The total amount recovered stands at 602 grams (21.2 oz), comprising hundreds of pieces.

On 8 September 2021, 1 square metre (11 sq ft) of the indented section of asphalt driveway where the meteorite landed was removed and taken to London's Natural History Museum.

Pieces of the Winchcombe meteorite are now part of a display in the Winchcombe Museum, which tells the story of its origins, unexpected arrival and its scientific significance.

== Composition and classification ==
The meteorite is thought to be a carbonaceous chondrite, the first collected on impact in Britain. The fragment did not experience rainfall and was placed in a protected environment within 12 hours of falling to Earth, meaning that the quality of the sample is comparable to those retrieved by probes from asteroids and offers a "near-pristine record of the composition of primitive asteroids." It is of a similar type to that retrieved by the Hayabusa2 mission from the asteroid 162173 Ryugu.
