= Kaidun meteorite =

Meteorite found in Yemen

Kaidun
- Type: Chondrite
- Class: Carbonaceous chondrite
- Group: CR2
- Parent body: Phobos (disputed)
- Country: Yemen
- Region: Hadhramaut Governorate
- Coordinates: 15°0′N 48°18′E
- Observed fall: Yes
- Fall date: 3 December 1980
- TKW: 2 kg
- Alternative names: Kaydun

Kaidun is a meteorite that fell on 3 December 1980 on a Soviet military base near what is now Al-Khuraybah in Hadhramaut, Yemen. A fireball was observed travelling from the northwest to the southeast, and a single stone weighing about 2 kilograms (4.4 lb) was recovered from a small impact pit. It has been suggested that Kaidun originated from the Martian moon of Phobos, but this is disputed.

== Composition ==
It contains a uniquely wide variety of minerals, causing debate about its origin. It is largely carbonaceous chondrite material of type CR2, but also contains fragments of other types, such as C1, CM1, and C3. Of the nearly 60 minerals found in the meteorite, several have not been found elsewhere in nature, such as florenskyite, which has the chemical formula FeTiP.

== Origin ==
In March 2004 it was suggested that the meteorite originated from the Martian moon Phobos. The reason Phobos has been suggested is the existence of two extremely rare alkaline-rich clasts visible in the meteorite, each of which entered the rock at different times. This suggests that the parent body would have been near a source of an alkaline-rich rock, which is almost wholly produced by deep differentiation. This points to Mars and one of its moons, and Phobos is more likely than Deimos because it is closer to Mars. However, mineralogical and noble gas work do not tie the lithic fragments to Mars, as they have other proven Martian meteorites, and this hypothesized link is tenuous at best. In support of the Phobos hypothesis, in 2017 two scientists at the Western University found that meteorites originating from Phobos (and even Deimos) can travel to Earth.

== See also ==
- Glossary of meteoritics
