= Carbonaceous chondrite =

Class of chondritic meteorites

- — Class —
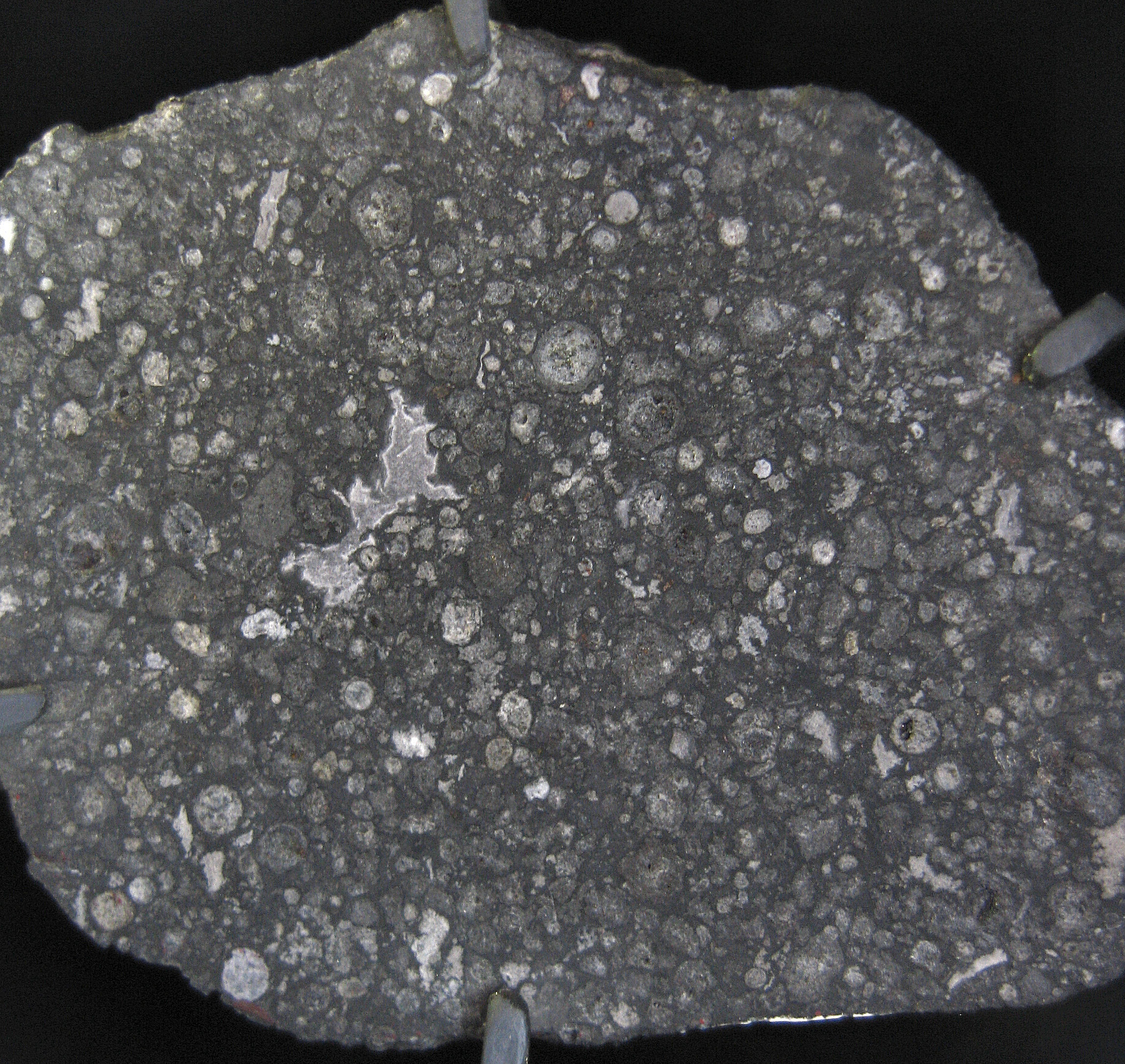
- A slice of the Allende meteorite showing circular chondrules.
- Type: Chondrite
- Alternative names: C chondrites

Carbonaceous chondrites or C chondrites are a class of chondritic meteorites comprising at least 8 known groups and many ungrouped meteorites. They include some of the most primitive known meteorites. The C chondrites represent only a small proportion (4.6%) of meteorite falls.

Some famous carbonaceous chondrites are: Allende, Murchison, Orgueil, Ivuna, Murray, Tagish Lake, Sutter's Mill, and Winchcombe.

== General description ==
C chondrites contain a relatively high proportion of carbon (up to 3%), which is in the form of graphite, carbonates, and organic compounds, including amino acids. In addition, they contain water and minerals that have been modified by the influence of water.

The carbonaceous chondrites were not exposed to higher temperatures, so that they are hardly changed by thermal processes. Some carbonaceous chondrites, such as the Allende meteorite, contain calcium-aluminum-rich inclusions (CAIs). These are compounds that emerged early from the primeval solar nebula, condensed out and represent the oldest minerals formed in the Solar System.

Some primitive carbonaceous chondrites, such as the CM chondrite Murchison, contain presolar minerals, including moissanite (natural silicon carbide) and tiny nanometer-sized diamonds that apparently were not formed in the Solar System. These presolar minerals were probably formed during the explosion of a nearby supernova or in the vicinity of a pulsating red giant (more precisely: a so-called AGB star) before they got into the cloud of matter from which the Solar System was formed. Such star explosions release pressure waves that can condense clouds of matter in their surroundings, leading to the formation of new ones, stars and planetary systems.

Another carbonaceous chondrite, the Flensburg meteorite (2019), provides evidence of the earliest known occurrence of liquid water in the young Solar System to date.

== Composition and classification ==
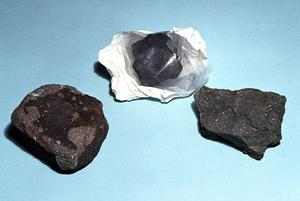
Some carbonaceous chondrites. From left to right: Allende, Yukon, and Murchison.

Carbonaceous chondrites are grouped according to distinctive compositions thought to reflect the type of parent body from which they originated. These C chondrite groups are now each named with a standard two-letter CX designation, where C stands for "carbonaceous" (other types of chondrites do not begin with this letter) plus a capital letter in the spot X, which is very often the first letter of the name of a prominent meteorite—often the first to be discovered—in the group. Such meteorites are often named for the place where they fell, thus giving no clue as to the physical nature of the group. Group CH, where H is for "high metal" is so far the only exception. See below for name derivations of each group.

Several groups of carbonaceous chondrites, notably the CM and CI groups, contain high percentages (3% to 22%) of water, as well as organic compounds. They are composed mainly of silicates, oxides, and sulphides, with the minerals olivine and serpentine being characteristic. The presence of volatile organic chemicals and water indicates that they have not undergone significant heating (>200 °C) since they were formed, and their compositions are considered to be close to that of the solar nebula from which the Solar System condensed. Other groups of C chondrites, e.g., CO, CV, and CK chondrites, are relatively poor in volatile compounds, and some of these have experienced significant heating on their parent asteroids.

=== CI group ===
This group, named after the Ivuna meteorite (Tanzania), have chemical compositions that are close to that measured in the solar photosphere (aside from gaseous elements, and elements such as lithium which are underrepresented in the Sun's photosphere by comparison to their abundance in CI chondrites). In this sense, they are chemically the most primitive known meteorites.

CI chondrites typically contain a high proportion of water (up to 22%), and organic matter in the form of amino acids and PAHs. Aqueous alteration promotes a composition of hydrous phyllosilicates, magnetite, and olivine crystals occurring in a black matrix, and a possible lack of chondrules. It is thought they have not been heated above 50 °C (122 °F), indicating that they condensed in the cooler outer portion of the solar nebula.

Five CI chondrites have been observed to fall: Ivuna, Orgueil, Alais, Tonk, and Revelstoke. Four others have been found by Japanese field parties in Antarctica. In general, the extreme fragility of CI chondrites causes them to be highly susceptible to terrestrial weathering, and they do not survive on Earth's surface for long after they fall.

=== CV group ===
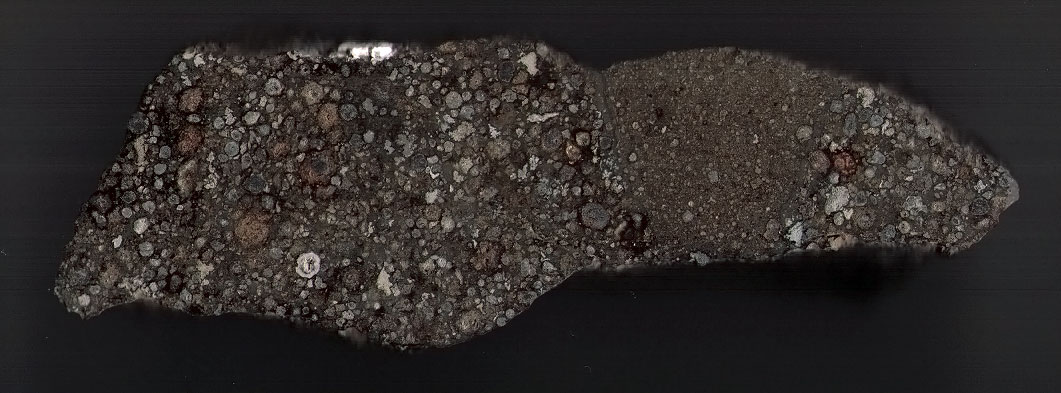
NWA 3118, CV3

This group takes its name from Vigarano (Italy). Most of these chondrites belong to the petrologic type 3.

CV chondrites observed falls:

- Allende
- Bali
- Bukhara
- Grosnaja
- Kaba
- Mokoia
- Vigarano

=== CM group ===
The group takes its name from Mighei (Ukraine), but the most famous member is the extensively studied Murchison meteorite. Many falls of this type have been observed and CM chondrites are known to contain a rich mix of complex organic compounds such as amino-acids and purine/pyrimidine nucleobases.

CM chondrite famous falls:

- Murchison
- Sutter's Mill
- Aguas Zarcas
- Jbilet Winselwan
- Winchcombe

=== CR group ===
The group takes its name from Renazzo (Italy). The best parent body candidate is 2 Pallas.

CR chondrites observed falls:

- Al Rais
- Kaidun
- Renazzo

Other famous CR chondrites:

- Dar al Gani 574
- El Djouf 001
- Northwest Africa 801

=== CH group ===
"H" stands for "high metal" because CH chondrites may contain up to as much as 40% of metal. That makes them one of the most metal-rich of any of the chondrite groups, second only to the CB chondrites and some ungrouped chondrites such as NWA 12273. The first meteorite discovered was ALH 85085. Chemically, these chondrites are closely related to CR and CB groups. All specimens of this group belong only to petrologic types 2 or 3.

=== CB group ===
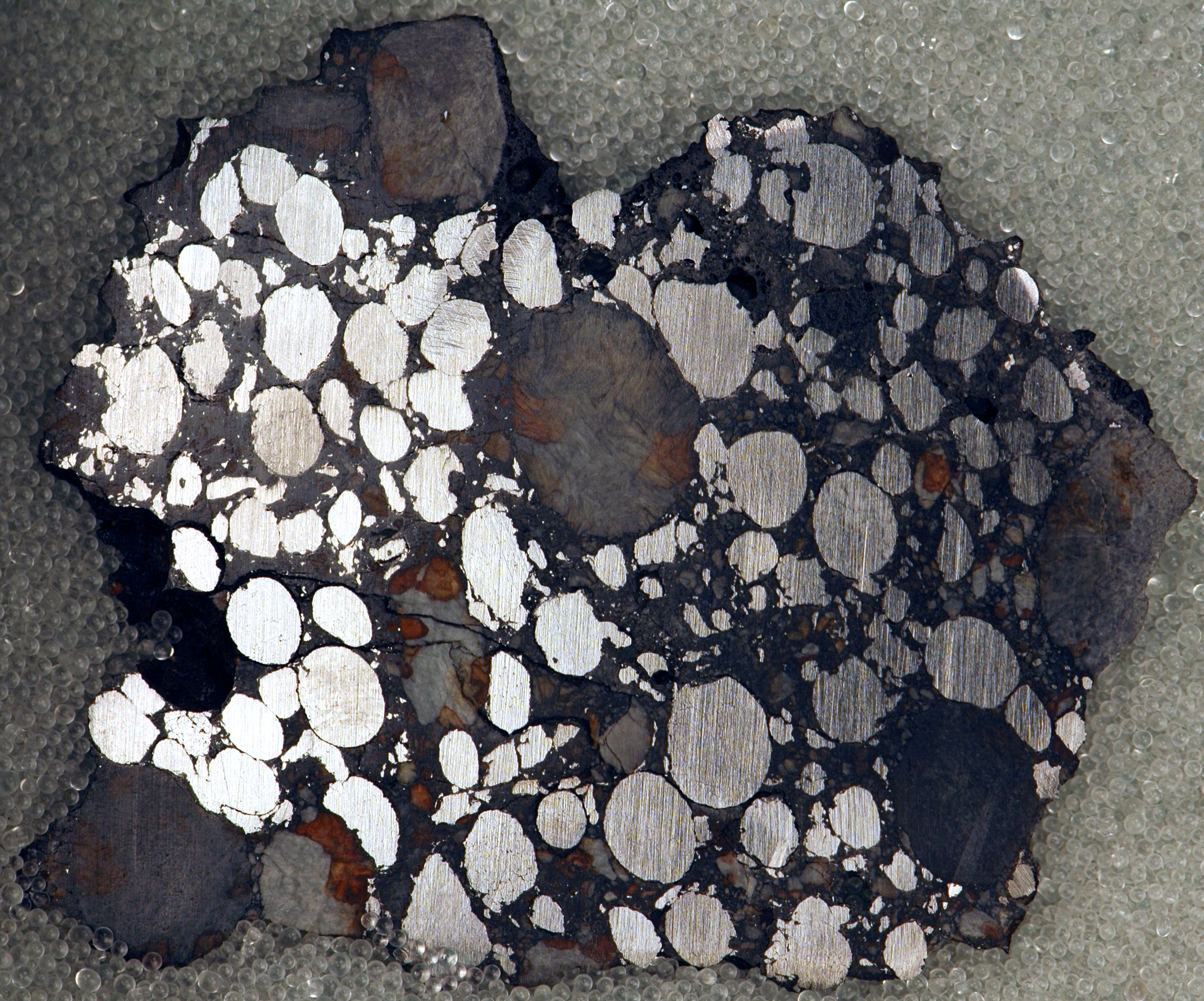
Gujba meteorite, a bencubbinite found in Nigeria. Polished slice, 4.6 × 3.8 cm. Note the nickel-iron chondrules, which have been age-dated to 4.5627 billion years.

The group takes its name from the most representative member: Bencubbin (Australia). Although these chondrites contain over 50% nickel-iron metal, they are not classified as mesosiderites because their mineralogical and chemical properties are strongly associated with CR chondrites.

=== CK group ===
This group takes its name from Karoonda (Australia). These chondrites are closely related to the CO and CV groups.

=== CO group ===
The group takes its name from Ornans (France). The chondrule size is only about 0.15 mm on average. They are all of petrologic type 3.

Famous CO chondrite falls:

- Ornans
- Kainsaz
- Warrenton
- Moss

Famous finds:

- Dar al Gani 749

=== CL group ===
Officially recognised in 2022 after minimum specimens (five) described. CL chondrites, named after type specimen(s) Loongana, are chondrite-rich, metal-rich, and volatile-poor.

=== C ungrouped ===
The most famous members:

- Tagish Lake
- Tarda

== Organic matter ==
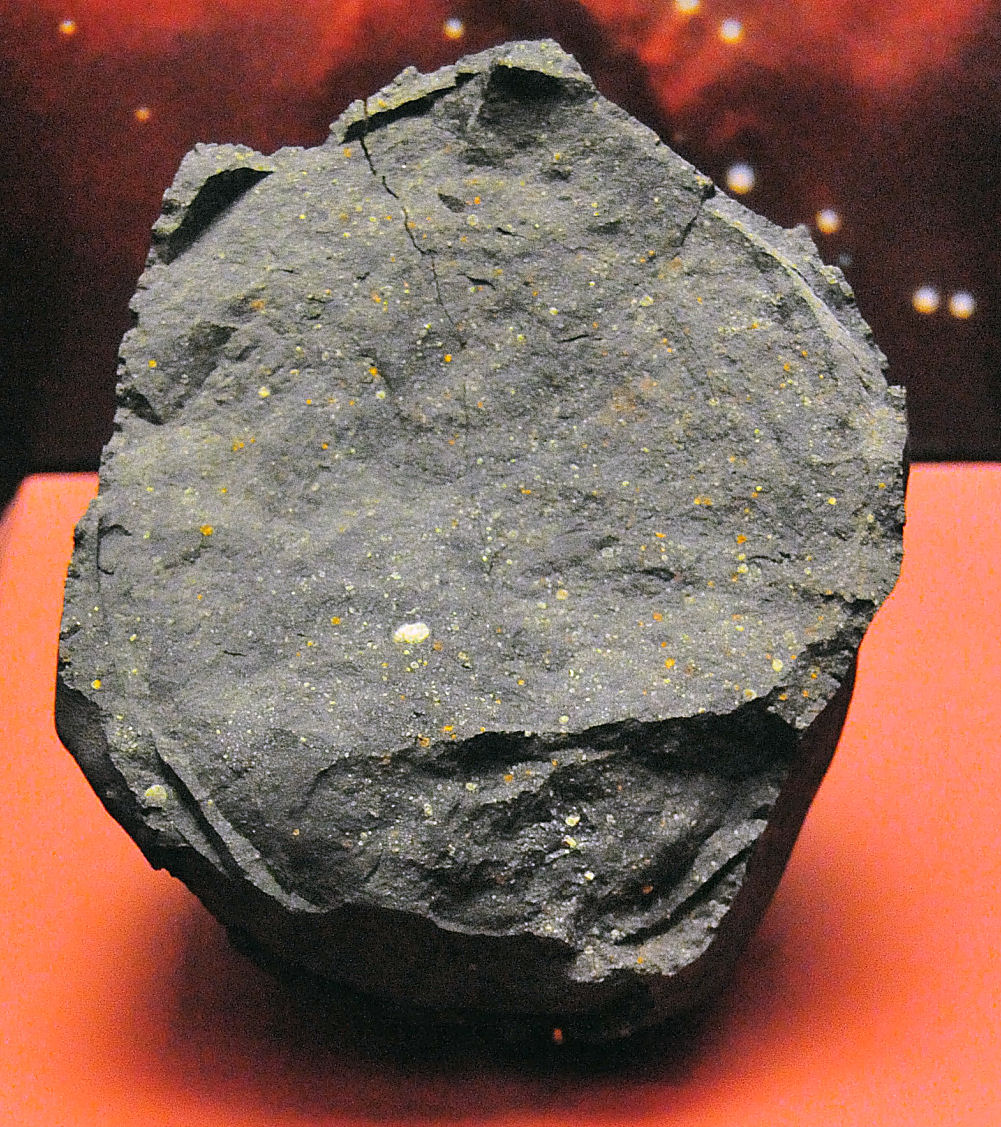
Murchison meteorite

Most of the organic carbon in CI and CM carbonaceous chondrites is an insoluble complex material. That is similar to the description for kerogen. A kerogen-like material is also in the ALH84001 Martian meteorite (an achondrite).

The CM meteorite Murchison has over 96 extraterrestrial amino acids and other compounds including carboxylic acids, hydroxy carboxylic acids, sulphonic, and phosphonic acids, aliphatic, aromatic, and polar hydrocarbons, fullerenes, heterocycles, carbonyl compounds, alcohols, amines, and amides.

=== Extraterrestrial amino acids ===
Amino acids in carbonaceous chondrites have important implications for theories describing the delivery of organic compounds to the early Earth and the subsequent development of life. Shortly after its fall and recovery in Australia in 1969, the Murchison meteorite was found to host five protein amino acids (glycine, alanine, valine, proline, and glutamic acid) in addition to 12 non-proteinogenic amino acids including α-aminoisobutyric acid and isovaline, which are rare on Earth. Since then, the number of characterised amino acids in the Murchison meteorite has risen to 96, including 12 of the 20 common biological amino acids, along with hundreds more that have been detected, but remain uncharacterised. While the abundance of amino acids present in terrestrial soils presents a potential source of contamination, most of the amino acids characterised in Murchison are terrestrially rare or absent.

Amino acids may be structurally chiral, meaning that they have two possible non-superimposable mirror image structures, termed enantiomers. Conventionally, these are referred to as left-handed (L) and right-handed (D) by analogy with glyceraldehyde. Living beings use L-amino acids, although there is no apparent reason why one enantiomer is favoured over the other as they behave equivalently in biological systems. In contrast with terrestrial biology, early laboratory studies, including the famous Miller-Urey Experiment, have shown that amino acids may form under a range of possible abiotic conditions with equal (racemic) mixtures of D- and L-enantiomers. Thus, the ratios between enantiomers for a given amino acid may discriminate between biotic and abiotic formation mechanisms. In the first characterisation of amino acids in Murchison, all chiral examples were present in racemic mixtures indicating an abiotic origin. This is consistent with proposed sythetic pathways, as the formation of isovaline and other α-dialkyl amino acids in CM chondrites has been attributed to the Strecker synthesis which produces racemic mixtures of enantiomers.

The Strecker synthesis of alpha amino acids from carbonyl compounds in the presence of ammonia and cyanide.

Ehrenfreund et al. (2001) found that amino acids in CI chondrites Ivuna and Orgueil were present at much lower concentrations than in CM chondrites (~30%), and that they had a distinct composition high in β-alanine, glycine, γ-ABA, and β-ABA but low in α-aminoisobutyric acid (AIB) and isovaline. This implies that they had formed by a different synthetic pathway, and on a different parent body from the CM chondrites.

==== Enantiomeric excesses observed in extraterrestrial amino acids ====
More recently, amino acids from several carbonaceous chondrites have been identified with significant L-enantiomeric excesses. L-excesses from 3–15% in several non-protein α-dialkyl amino acids have been found in the Murchison and Murray meteorites. Their extraterrestrial origin is indicated by their absence in biological systems and significant heavy isotope enrichments in ^{13}C and deuterium compared to terrestrial values. Further characterisation of L-isovaline excesses up to 20.5% in a range of carbonaceous chondrite groups have supported a hypothesis that increasing hydrothermal alteration of the host meteorite correlates with increasing observed L-enantiomeric excess. Large L-excesses for α-H amino acids have also been reported, but these are more problematic due to the potential for terrestrial contamination. The ungrouped C2 chondrite Tagish Lake has L-aspartic acid excesses up to ~60%, with carbon isotope measurements indicating an extraterrestrial origin due to significant enrichments in ^{13}C. In Tagish Lake, proteinogenic amino acids show both significant L-excesses, and racemic mixtures: glutamic acid, serine, and threonine were found to have ~50 – 99% L-excesses, while alanine was racemic.

It has been proposed that extraterrestrial amino acid L-excesses observed in carbonaceous chondrites are a result of differences in the crystallisation behaviour of the enantiomers. Circularly polarised ultraviolet light has been shown to generate L-excesses in crystallising amino acids for experimental conditions mimicking alteration on asteroids, and this is thought to be the dominant extraterrestrial source of chiral symmetry breaking (i.e., the favouring of one enantiomer over another). It is notable that only excesses of the L-enantiomer have been observed in extraterrestrial amino acids, suggesting that the abiotic process responsible for enantiomeric enrichments may be the original source of the L-amino acid selectivity currently observed in terrestrial life.

==== Implications for extraterrestrial biosignatures ====
NASA have proposed a "Ladder of Life Detection" threshold of >20% enantiomeric excess in amino acids to distinguish extraterrestrial biosignatures. But, as previously mentioned, recent studies of carbonaceous chondrites and complementary experimental investigations have demonstrated that even larger enantiomeric excesses may be produced by abiotic pathways. To identify chiral asymmetry (enantiomeric excess) of biological origin, Glavin et al. (2020) emphasise three criteria that must be met: chiral asymmetry, light ^{13}C isotopic composition, and simplified distribution of structural isomers. If a distribution of amino acids in an extraterrestrial sample is found to be chirally asymmetric, display structural isomeric preference, and carry ^{13}C, ^{15}N, and D depletions relative to associated inorganic material, a compelling case may be made for its biological origin. With the current interest in sample return missions from carbonaceous asteroids (e.g., OSIRIS-REx) and Mars headed by NASA and other space agencies, the subsequent analysis of returned samples devoid of terrestrial contamination will provide the best opportunity to discover potential biosignatures in the Solar System.

== See also ==
- Glossary of meteoritics
- List of meteorite minerals
