= Ornans (meteorite) =

Meteorite found in France

- Type: Chondrite
- Class: Carbonaceous chondrite
- Clan: CM-CO
- Group: CO
- Country: France
- Coordinates: 47°7′N 6°9′E
- Observed fall: Yes
- Fall date: 1868
- TKW: 6 kilograms (13 lb)

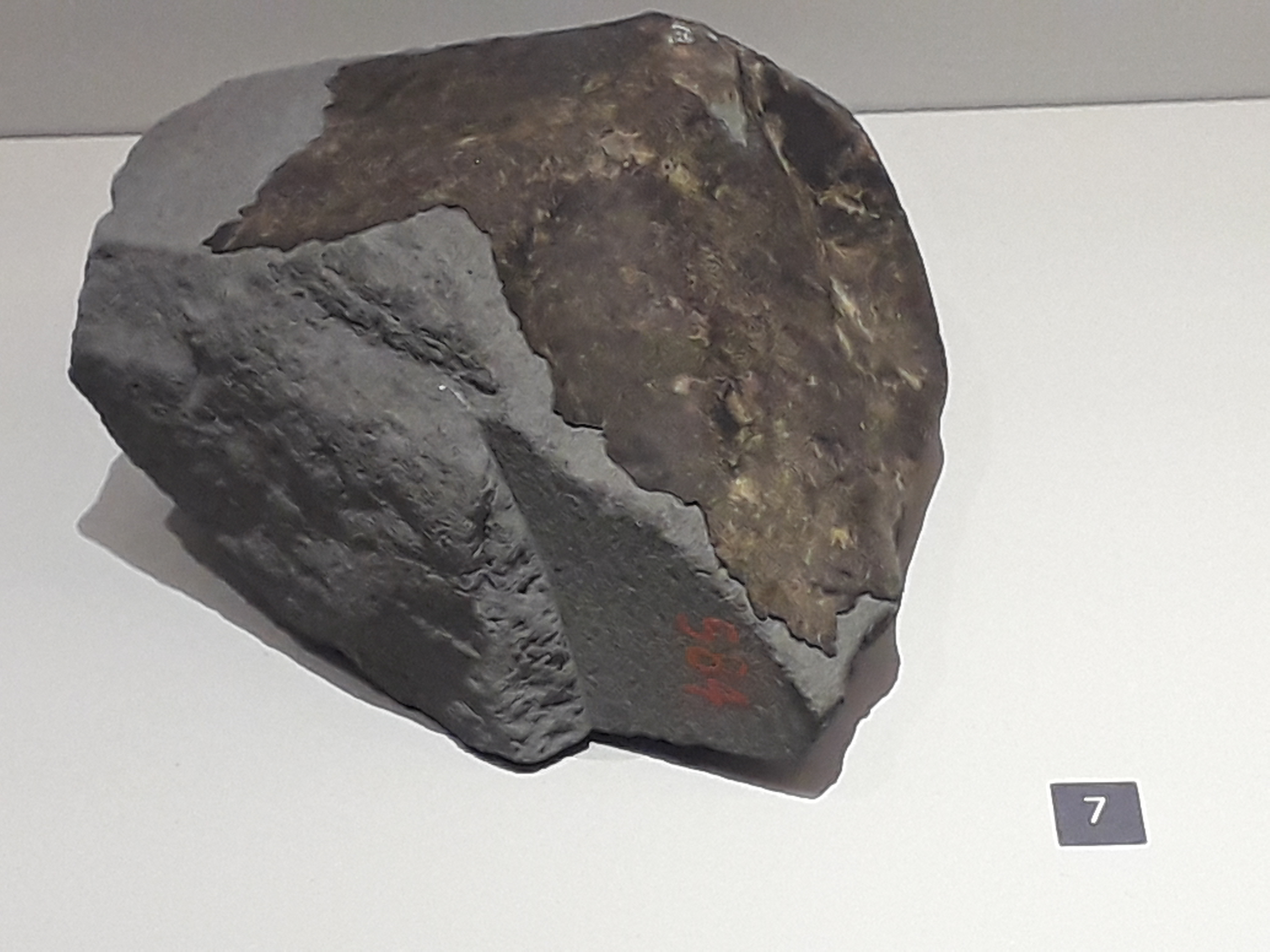
a photo of the Ornans meteorite

The Ornans meteorite is a carbonaceous chondrite and the type specimen of the CO group (Carbonaceous Ornans group). Its fall was observed in France in 1868.
