= Chondrule =

Round grain found in chondrites, stony meteorites

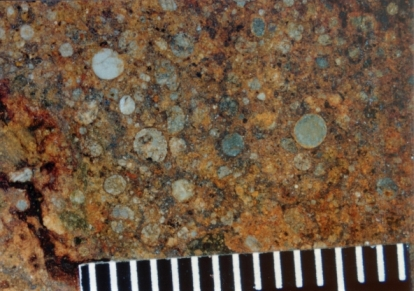
Chondrules in the chondrite classification Grassland. A millimeter scale is shown.

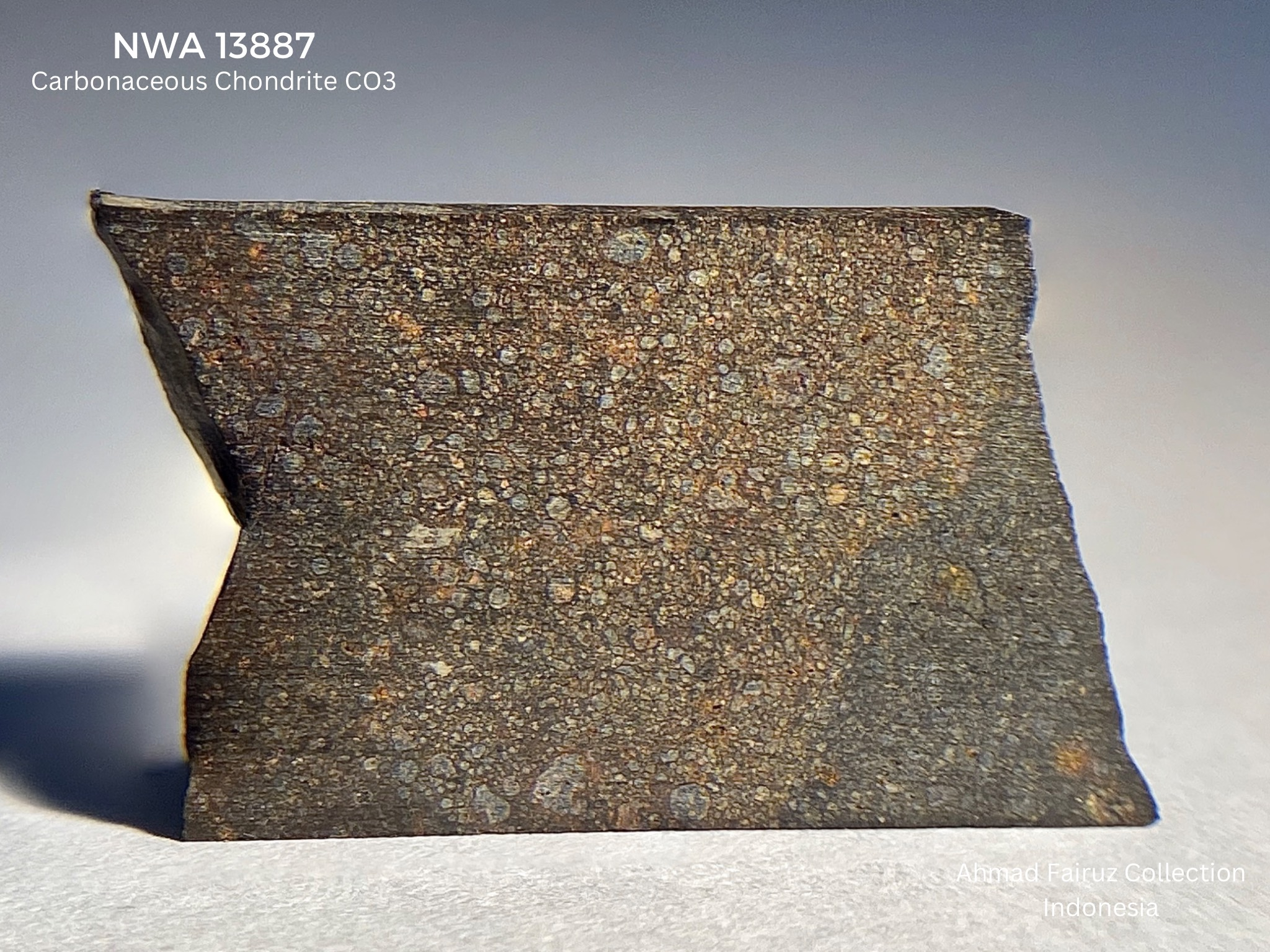
Chondrules in the Carbonaceous Chondrite NWA 13887

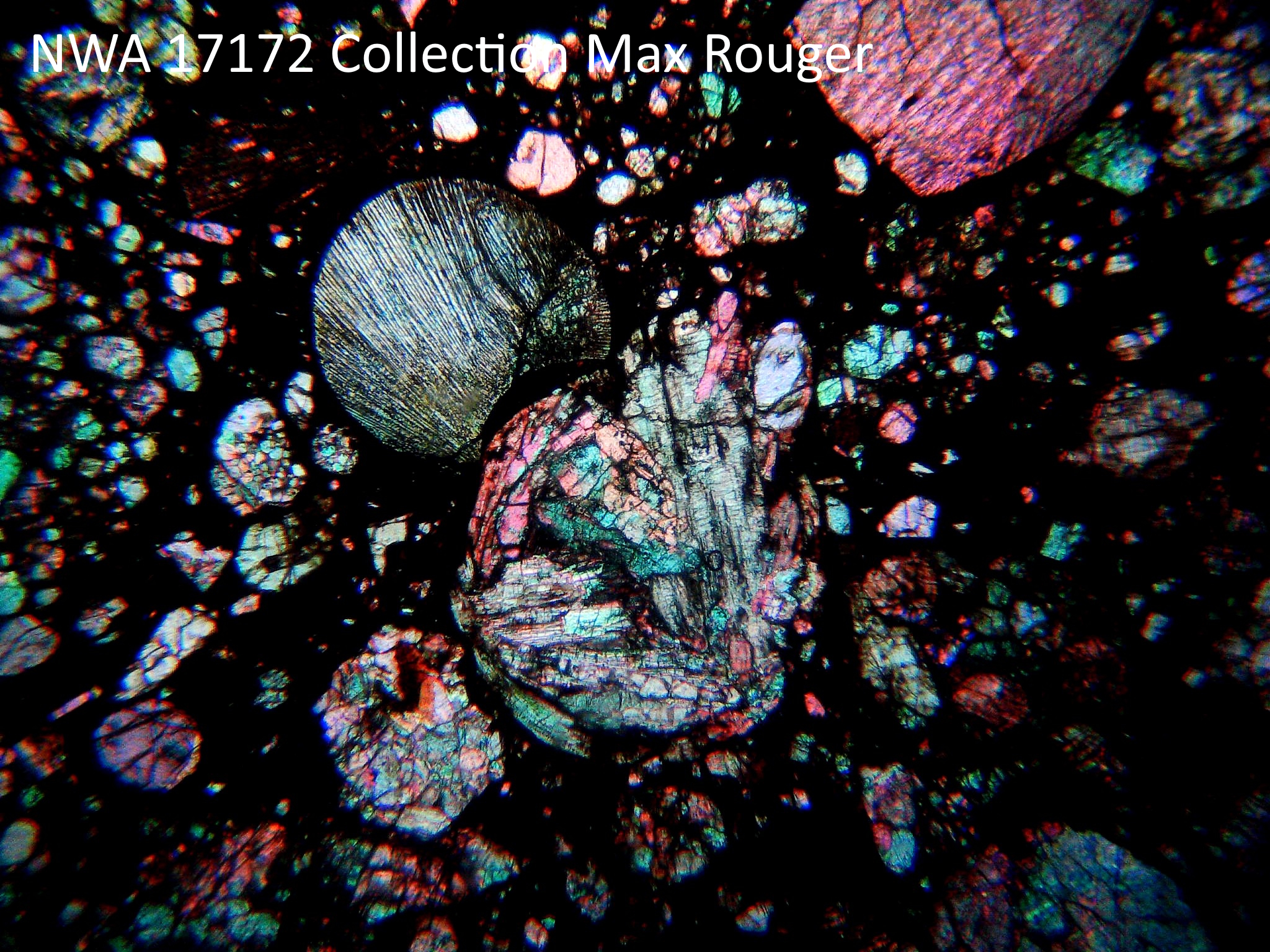
Chondrules in a thin section of ordinary chondrite observed under polarized light/analyzed.

A chondrule (from Ancient Greek χόνδρος chondros, grain) is a round grain found in a chondrite. Chondrules form as molten or partially molten droplets in space before being accreted to their parent asteroids. Because chondrites represent one of the oldest solid materials within the Solar System and are believed to be the building blocks of the planetary system, it follows that an understanding of the formation of chondrules is important to understand the initial development of the planetary system.

== Abundance and size ==
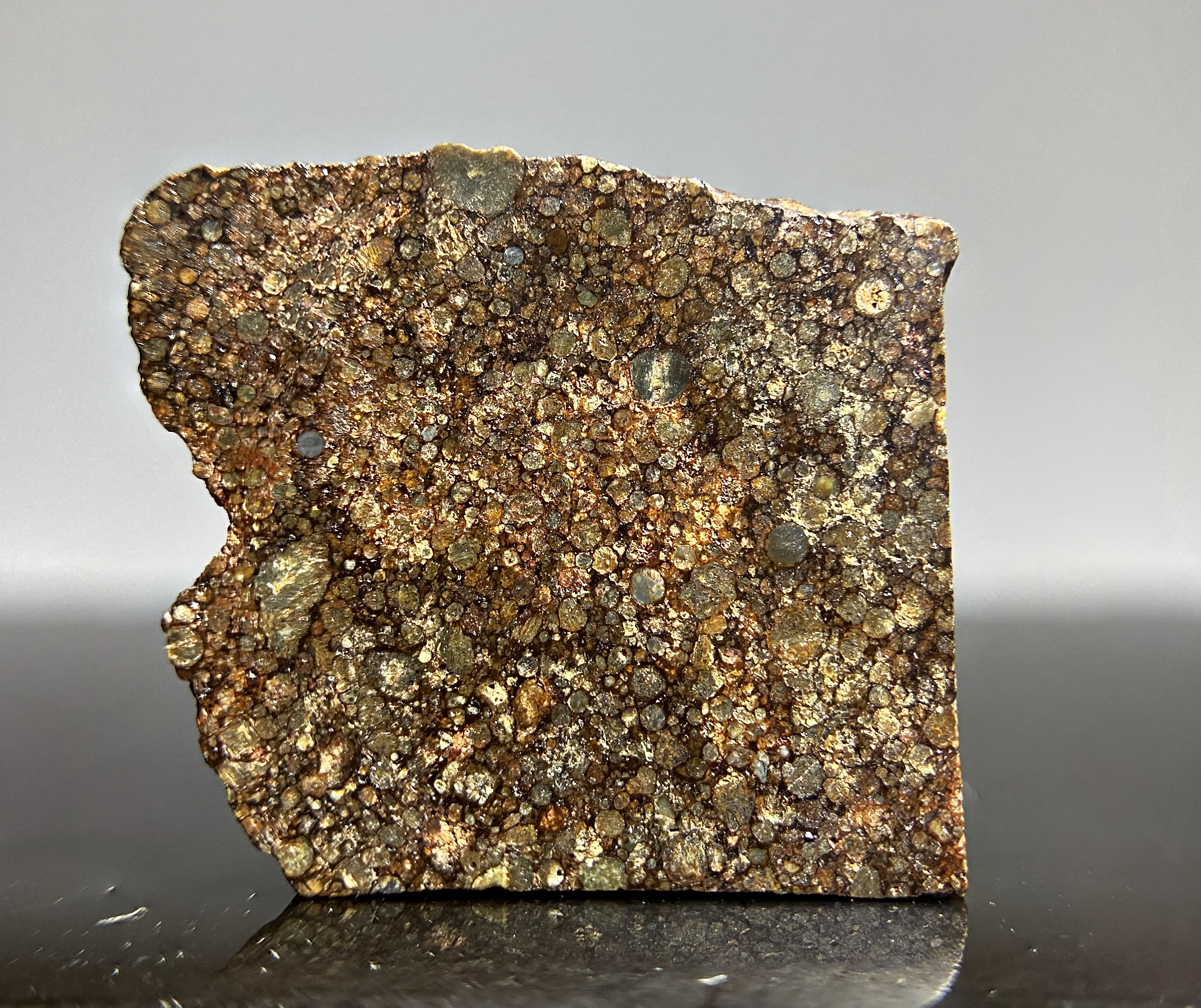
Closely packed Chondrules in CO3 Carbonaceous Chondrite meteorite NWA 10499

Different kinds of the stony, non-metallic meteorites called chondrites contain different fractions of chondrules (see table below). In general, carbonaceous chondrites contain the smallest percentage (by volume) of chondrules, including the CI chondrites which, paradoxically, do not contain any chondrules despite their designation as chondrites, whereas ordinary and enstatite chondrites contain the most. Because ordinary chondrites represent 80% of the meteorites that fall to earth, and because ordinary chondrites contain 60–80% chondrules, it follows that (excluding dust) most of the meteoritic material that falls on earth is made up of chondrules.

Chondrules can range in diameter from just a few micrometers to over 1 centimetre (0.39 in). Again, different kinds of chondrites contain different ranges of chondrule sizes: they are smallest in CH, CM, and CO chondrites (see meteorite classification), moderately large in CR, CV, L, LL, and R chondrites, and largest in some CB chondrites (see table). Other chondrite groups are intermediate between these.

Table 1: Chondrule sizes and abundances
Chondrite group	abundance (vol%)	avg. diam. (mm)
CI	0	–
CM	20	0.3
CO	50	0.15
CV	45	1
CK	45	1
CR	50–60	0.7
CH	70	0.02
CB	20–40	10 (a subgroup), 0.2 (b subgroup)
H	60–80	0.3
L	60–80	0.7
LL	60–80	0.9
EH	60–80	0.2
EL	60–80	0.6
R	>40	0.4
K	30	0.6

== Mineralogy and petrology ==
Most chondrules are composed primarily of the silicate minerals olivine and pyroxene, surrounded by feldspathic material that may either be glassy or crystalline. Small amounts of other minerals are often present, including Fe sulfide (troilite), metallic Fe-Ni, oxides such as chromite, and phosphates such as merrillite. Less common types of chondrules may be dominantly composed of feldspathic material (again either glassy or crystalline), silica, or metallic Fe-Ni and sulfides.

Chondrules display a wide variety of textures, which can be seen when the chondrule is sliced open and polished. Some show textural evidence for extremely rapid cooling from a molten or nearly completely molten state. Pyroxene-rich chondrules that contain extremely fine-grained, swirling masses of fibrous crystals only a few micrometers in size or smaller are called cryptocrystalline chondrules. When the pyroxene fibers are coarser, they may appear to radiate from a single nucleation site on the surface, forming a radial or excentroradial texture. Olivine-rich chondrules may contain parallel plates of that mineral, surrounded by a continuous shell of olivine and containing feldspathic glass between the plates; these are known as barred textures. Other observed textural features that are clearly the result of very rapid cooling are dendritic and hopper-shaped olivine grains, and chondrules that are composed entirely of glass.

More commonly, chondrules display what is known as a porphyritic texture. In these, grains of olivine and/or pyroxene are equidimensional and sometimes euhedral. They are named on the basis of the dominant mineral, i.e. porphyritic olivine (PO), porphyritic pyroxene (PP), and porphyritic olivine-pyroxene (POP). It seems likely that these chondrules cooled more slowly than those with radial or barred textures, however they still may have solidified in a matter of hours.

The composition of olivine and pyroxene in chondrules varies widely, although the range is usually narrow within any single chondrule. Some chondrules contain very little iron oxide (FeO), resulting in olivine and pyroxene that are close to forsterite (Mg_{2}SiO_{4}) and enstatite (MgSiO_{3}) in composition. These are commonly called Type I chondrules by scientists, and often contain large amounts of metallic Fe. Other chondrules formed under more oxidizing conditions and contain olivine and pyroxene with large amounts of FeO (e.g., olivine with the formula (Mg,Fe)_{2}SiO_{4}). Such chondrules are called Type II. Most chondrites contain both Type I and Type II chondrules mixed together, including those with both porphyritic and nonporphyritic textures, although there are exceptions to this.

== Formation ==
Chondrules are believed to have formed by a rapid (flash) heating (within minutes or less) and melting of solid dust aggregates of approximately Solar composition under temperatures of about 1000 K. These temperatures are lower than those under which CAIs are thought to have formed. However, the environmental setting, the energy source for the heating, and the precursor material are not known. The solar nebula or a protoplanetary environment are possible places of formation.

Proposed heating mechanisms are:

- Impacts between molten planetesimals
- Meteor ablation
- Hot inner nebula
- FU Orionis-type outburst of the early sun
- Energetic bipolar-shaped outflows
- Nebular lightning
- Magnetic flares
- Shock waves in the protoplanetary disk shocks
- Supernova radiation and shock wave

Isotope studies indicate a nearby supernova explosion added fresh material to what became the Solar System. The Ningqiang carbonaceous chondrite contained sulfur-36 derived from chlorine-36. As chlorine-36 has a half-life of only 300,000 years, it could not have travelled far from its origin. The presence of iron-60 also indicates a nearby supernova. Such proximity implies the radiation and shock wave would have been significant, although the degree of heating is not known.

In contrast, the fine grained matrix, in which the chondrules are embedded after their accretion into the chondrites parent body, is assumed to have been condensed directly from the solar nebula.

== Types ==
Chondrules may be organized into textural types according to such characteristics as their appearance, color, texture, and crystalline structure.

Name	Abbreviation	Picture
Porphyritic olivine	PO	
Porphyritic pyroxene	PP	
Porphyritic olivine-pyroxene	POP	
Radial pyroxene	RP	
Barred olivine	BO	
Cryptocrystalline	C	
Granular olivine-pyroxene	GOP	
Glassy chondrules	–	

== See also ==
- Glossary of meteoritics
- List of meteorite minerals
- Carbonaceous chondrites
- Chondrites
- Cosmochemistry
- Radiometric dating
