= Alais meteorite =

Meteorite found in France

Alais
- Type: Chondrite
- Class: Carbonaceous chondrite
- Group: CI1
- Country: France
- Region: Occitanie
- Coordinates: 44°7′N 4°5′E
- Observed fall: Yes
- Fall date: 15 March 1806
- TKW: 6 kg (13 lb 4 oz)
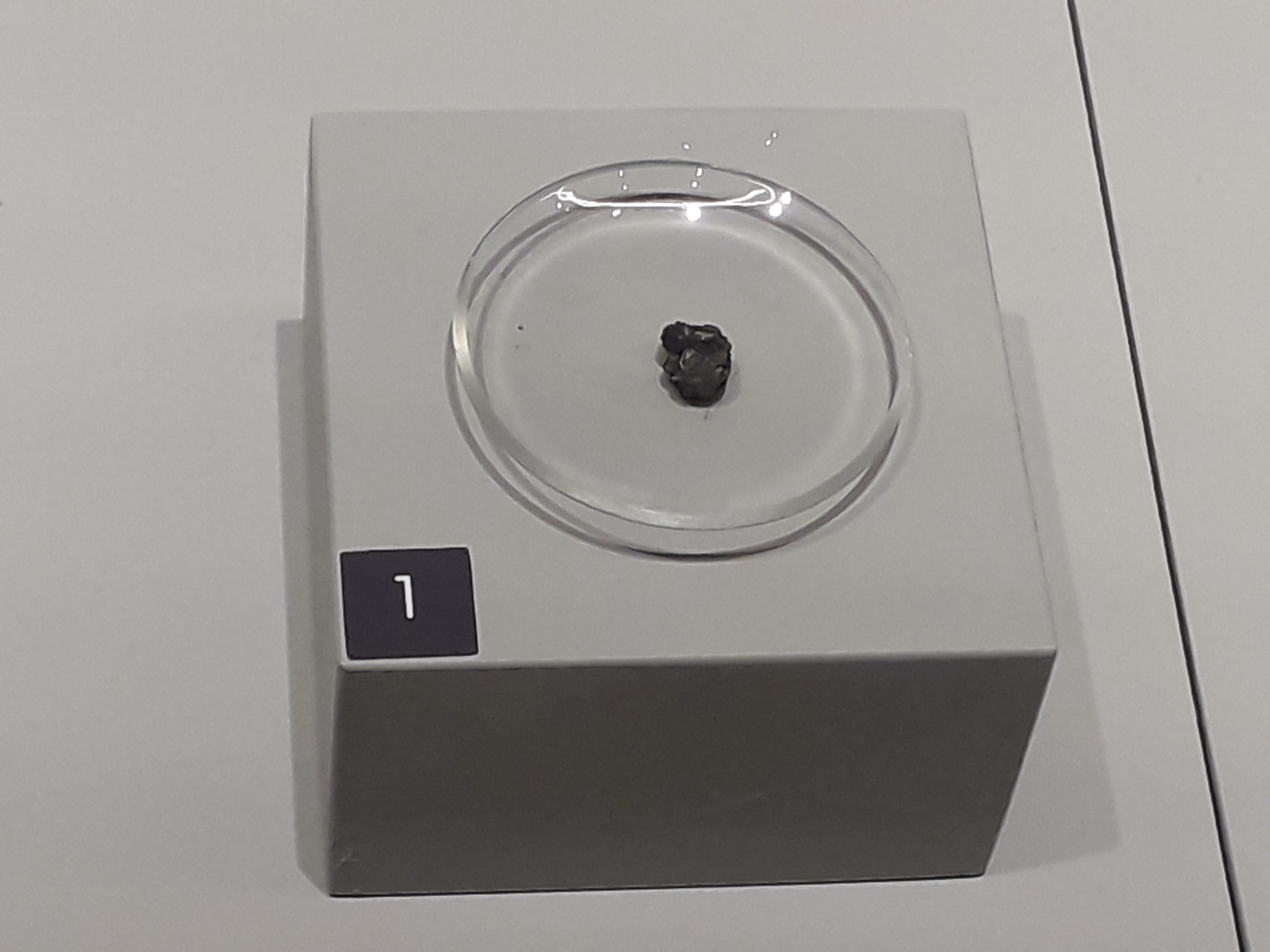
- A fragment of the meteorite on display in 2018

Alais or Allais is the first carbonaceous chondrite meteorite identified. It fell near Alès in 1806 in multiple fragments which together weighed 6 kg (13 lb 4 oz), although only 0.26 kg (9.2 oz) remains. The meteorite contains a number of elements in similar proportions to the Solar System in its primordial state. It also contains organic compounds and water. It has proved to be one of the most important meteorites discovered in France.

== History ==
At 17:00 on 15 March 1806, two detonations were heard near Alès in Gard, France. Shortly afterwards, two soft black stones were discovered in the villages of Saint-Étienne-de-l'Olm and Castelnau-Valence, weighing 4 kg (8 lb 13 oz) and 2 kg (4 lb 7 oz) respectively. The fragments were collected by people who observed the impact and given to two scientists that lived locally. The meteorite was analysed by Louis Jacques Thénard, who published a study in 1807, showing that it had a high carbon content. It was initially doubted that the fragments were of non-terrestrial origins as their attributes were markedly different to existing meteorites. However, it was increasingly realised that this was a new, albeit rare, type of meteorite. The meteorite is also known as Valence.

=== Curation and distribution ===
As an early fall (soon after the consensus that meteorites were real, extraterrestrial phenomenon), Alais has largely been dispersed. Few samples have been preserved, less than Orgueil, but more than Tonk and particularly Revelstoke.

Org	Mass	Place	Country	Ref
Mus. NdH	45 g	Paris	France	
Geol. Surv. Ind.	5g	Kolkata	India	
Vat. Met. Coll.	4.5g	Castel Gandolfo	Italy	
ASU	3g	Tempe	USA	
Field Mus.	3.6g	Chicago	USA	
Uni. Tübingen	1.9g	Tübingen	Germany	
Geol. Surv. Ca.	1.9g	Ottawa	Canada	
Mus. fur Nat.	1.7g	Berlin	Germany	
Nat. Hist. Mus.	1.7g	Wien	Austria	
Smithsonian	0.7g	Washington	USA	
Am. Mus. N.H.	0.6g	New York	USA	
IfP	0.5g	Munster	Germany	
Ro. Akad. Nauk.	<.5g	Moscow	Russia	
West. Aus. Mus.	<.5g	Perth	Australia	
DuPont Coll.	0.2g	Palatine	USA	

Source: Grady, M. M. Catalogue of Meteorites, 5th Edition, Cambridge University Press

== Description ==
=== Overview ===
The Alais meteorite is one of the most important meteorites in France. It is black with loose friable textures with a low density of less than 1.7 g/cm^{3} (0.061 lb/cu in). Originally consisting of fragments that together weighed 6 kg (13 lb 4 oz), it has been subject to substantial scientific examination and currently only 260 g (9.2 oz) remains. A fragment, weighing 39.3 g (1.39 oz) is held by the National Museum of Natural History, France.

=== Composition and classification ===
The meteorite is one of five known meteorites belonging to the CI chondrite group. This group is remarkable for having an elemental distribution that has the strongest similarity to that of the solar nebula. Except for certain volatile elements, like carbon, hydrogen, oxygen, nitrogen and the noble gases, which are not present in the meteorites in the same proportions, the ratios of the elements are very similar. The meteorite contains cubanite, dolomite, fosterite, pyrrhotite and zircon amongst other minerals.

== Origin of life controversy ==
The meteorite has been at the centre of controversial claims about an extraterrestrial origin of life since the discovery of organic matter on the meteorite by Jöns Jacob Berzelius. Organic compounds, amino acids and water have been found in the meteorite. However, studies differentiate between organic and biological matter, the latter not being present.

== See also ==
- Glossary of meteoritics
