= CI chondrite =

Group of rare meteorites

- — Group —
- Type: Chondrite
- Class: Carbonaceous chondrite
- Parent body: Debated
- Total known specimens: Debated: 5–10+
- TKW: 17 kilograms (37 lb)
- Alternative names: CI chondrites, C1 chondrites, CI chondrite meteorites, C1 chondrite meteorites

CI chondrites, also called C1 chondrites or Ivuna-type carbonaceous chondrites, are a group of rare carbonaceous chondrites, a type of stony meteorite. They are named after the Ivuna meteorite, the type specimen. They represent the most chemically primitive meteorites known, with elemental compositions closely matching the Sun.

These rare carbonaceous chondrites are defined by their lack of visible chondrules due to extensive aqueous alteration. Despite this alteration, they preserved the solar system's original elemental composition, making them the standard reference material for cosmic abundances in planetary science. The Orgueil, Alais, Ivuna, Tonk, and Revelstoke meteorites, along with CI-like Antarctic specimens, provide windows into the early solar system's chemistry, the formation of volatiles, and possibly the origins of life's building blocks.

== Designation ==
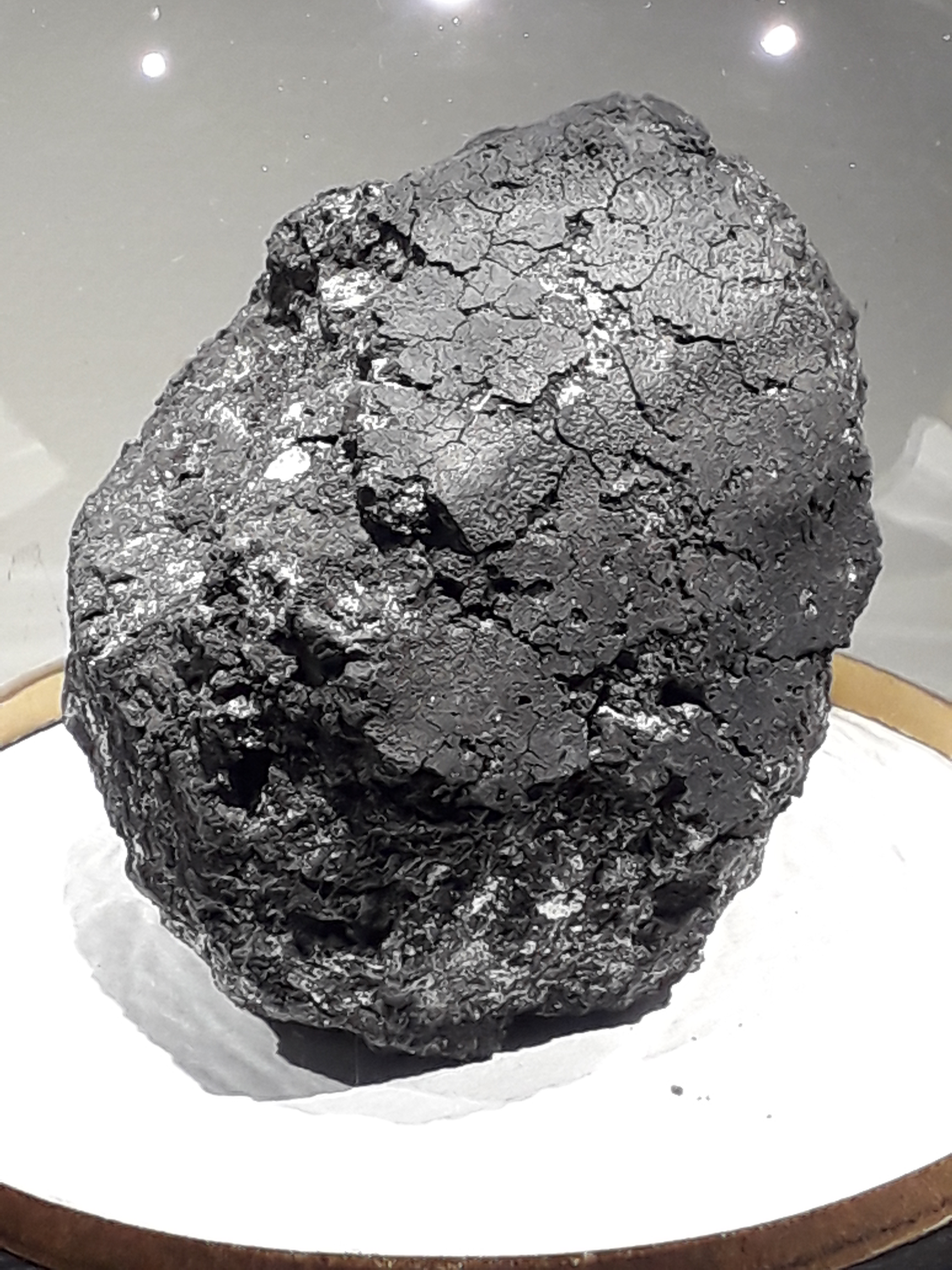
Orgueil meteorite, a CI chondrite that fell in France in 1864. Picture taken at the Museum of Natural History in Paris.

The abbreviation CI is derived from the C for carbonaceous and in the name scheme of Wasson, the I from Ivuna, the type locality in Tanzania. The 1 in C1 stands for the type 1 meteorites in the older classification scheme of Van Schmus-Wood, still used for petrography. Petrographic type-1 meteorites, by definition, have no fully visible chondrules.

== Physical and Chemical Characteristics ==
=== Elemental composition ===
==== Carbon ====
CI chondrites contain significant amounts of carbon, ranging from approximately 3-5 wt%, primarily in organic form. Analysis of the Ivuna meteorite revealed a total carbon concentration of 3.31 wt%, with about 90% being organic carbon. While this represents the highest carbon content among carbonaceous chondrites, it is surpassed by some Ureilites, which can contain even greater carbon concentrations.

==== Oxygen ====
Oxygen is the most abundant element in CI chondrites (46 wt%.), with a distinctive isotopic composition that serves as a crucial identifier. CI chondrites contain three stable oxygen isotopes (^{16}O, ^{17}O, and ^{18}O) that, when plotted on a three-isotope diagram, occupy a specific field clearly distinguishable from other meteorite groups. They show significant enrichment in ^{18}O and moderate enrichment in ^{17}O compared to petrologically similar CM chondrites, with no overlap between these groups. Antarctic CI-like meteorites exhibit even greater ^{18}O enrichment, representing the macroscopic samples with the heaviest oxygen isotopic composition in the Solar System—a signature that provides essential insights into their unique formation conditions.

==== Iron ====
Iron is present with 18-20 wt%. This is a marginally higher level than CM chondrites, as iron is somewhat cooler-forming than magnesium. The siderophiles nickel and cobalt follow iron as well. The majority of the iron is in the form of cations in the phyllosilicates and iron bound as magnetite. Some appears as ferrihydrite, but not in Ivuna.

=== Mineralogical composition and matrix ===
CI chondrites are primarily composed of fine-grained phyllosilicates (>90% by volume) with a dark and fine-grained clay-like matrix rich in carbonaceous material. Their matrix contains magnetite (~10%), iron sulfides like pyrrhotite (~7%), carbonates (~5%), and ferrihydrite (~5%), with smaller amounts of pentlandite and other minerals. The dominant components are serpentine-saponite intergrowths (~65% by weight). Framboidal magnetite occurs within the matrix and may have formed through precipitation from a gel-like phase. While most phyllosilicates in the CI chondrites are fine-grained and poorly crystalline, in Alais and Ivuna well-crystallized phyllosilicates often occur as coarse (10s μm in size) fragments and clusters that are not commonly found in Orgueil.

Magnetite is the second most abundant mineral in CI chondrites. It occurs in various morphologies, including crystals, spheres, framboids (raspberry-like clusters), and plaquettes (stacked or beehive-like structures), which are distinctive to CIs. The mineral formed through the oxidation of sulfides, primarily pyrrhotite and its nickel-rich variants, likely occurring in multiple generations. Other minerals found include iron sulfides like pyrrhotite, pentlandite, troilite and cubanite. The matrix also hosts isolated ferromagnesian silicates, such as olivine (forsterite with fayalite Fa10–20), clinopyroxene, and orthopyroxene, which crystallized at high temperatures and remain unaltered. Water-bearing, clay-rich phyllosilicates, including montmorillonite and serpentine-like minerals, are among the main constituents. Additionally, alteration minerals such as epsomite (found in microscopic veins), vaterite, carbonates, and sulfates are present.

Furthermore, these meteorites lack intact chondrules, calcium-aluminum-rich inclusions (CAIs), and amoeboid olivine aggregates (AOAs) due to extensive aqueous alteration.

=== Water-bearing minerals ===
CI chondrites contain between 18 and 20 wt% water (a greater level than Comet 67P/Churyumov-Gerasimenko) with porosities reaching up to ~25-30%, which appears correlated to their high water content. The water is primarily bound within water-bearing silicates and present in the form of hydroxyl (-OH) groups in phyllosilicates (e.g., montmorillonite and serpentine-like minerals). Analysis of the Ivuna meteorite revealed 12.73 wt% total water, divided between interlayer water (6.58 wt%) and structural OH/H_{2}O in phyllosilicates (6.15 wt%). Extensive aqueous alteration is evidenced by the presence of crosscutting veins filled with Na-, Ca-, and Mg-sulfates (epsomite, hexahydrite, gypsum, and blodite). Liquid water must have penetrated the parent body through cracks and fissures, depositing these hydrated phases. Interestingly, fluid inclusions—intact crystal voids containing ancient liquids—have been identified in Ivuna and Orgueil, representing the only surviving direct samples of brines from the early Solar System.

=== Carbon compounds ===
The majority of the carbon in CI chondrites (> 70%) exists as insoluble organic matter (IOM), a kerogen-like macromolecule consisting of a highly cross-linked aromatic network with aliphatic linkages, heterocyclic compounds, and various functional groups. The soluble organic matter (the remaining < 30% portion) includes various compounds such as aliphatic hydrocarbons, polycyclic aromatic hydrocarbons (PAHs), alcohols, and carbonyl compounds.

Phenanthrene and anthracene, which are three-ring PAHs, are the most prevalent PAHs and thought to be the result of IOM fraction during aqueous and thermal processing. Diverse molecular distributions of polycyclic PAHs have been observed between the Ivuna and Orgueil meteorites, revealing significant compositional heterogeneity within the CI parent body. Furthermore, this variation has been attributed to a process termed "asteroidal chromatography," whereby organic compounds are differentially separated and distributed throughout the asteroid during fluid migration. Several biologically relevant molecules have been identified in the Orgueil meteorite, including purines such as adenine and guanine, and the pyrimidine uracil, alongside non-biological compounds like triazines.

Amino acids are present in CI chondrites at concentrations of approximately 70-75 nmol/g, with a relatively simple distribution dominated by beta-alanine. This contrasts with other carbonaceous chondrite groups and may result from extensive aqueous alteration rather than inherent chemical differences. Orgueil displays a notable L-isovaline enantiomeric excess of about 19%, likely amplified by aqueous processes. Additionally, CI chondrites contain carbonates (approximately 5% by volume) including dolomite, calcite, and breunnerite, as well as various sulfur compounds such as alkyl and aromatic disulfides, though some sulfur content may result from terrestrial weathering oxidative processes.

=== Comparison with other chondrite groups ===
CI chondrites stand apart from all other meteorite groups due to their extensive aqueous alteration, with minimal (< 0.1wt%) visible chondrules and calcium-aluminum-rich inclusions (CAIs), and no reported amoeboid olivine aggregates (AOAs). Despite this alteration, they paradoxically maintain the closest match to solar abundances for non-volatile elements while containing higher volatile concentrations than most meteorites.

This unique composition is reflected in their elemental ratios—CI chondrites exhibit a relatively high Mg/Si ratio (1.07), exceeded only by CV chondrites, alongside the lowest Ca/Si ratio (0.057) among all carbonaceous chondrites. Their oxygen isotope values reach the highest levels in the carbonaceous chondrite family, with ratios comparable to terrestrial values.

When compared to CM chondrites, CI chondrites show evidence of more extensive aqueous alteration. CM chondrites preserve some original chondrules and calcium-aluminum-rich inclusions despite containing up to 70% phyllosilicates. CI chondrites, by contrast, consist of over 95% phyllosilicate matrix with virtually no recognizable primordial features. The mineral assemblages in these groups are distinctly different: CM chondrites contain abundant tochilinite-cronstedtite intergrowths with Fe-Ni sulfides, while CI chondrites are characterized by magnesium-rich serpentine and saponite (smectite) minerals, along with significant amounts of magnetite, carbonates, and sulfates. These mineralogical differences reflect varying water-to-rock ratios and alteration temperatures during parent body processing.

== Formation and Alteration ==
=== Solar Nebula Conditions Required for CI Formation ===
CI chondrites formed forming within the first few million years of the Solar System history in volatile-rich regions of the solar nebula, likely beyond the snow line (> 4 AU from the Sun) where temperatures around 160K allowed water ice preservation. This formation location explains their higher concentrations of carbonaceous and volatile-rich materials compared to other chondrite groups. This is supported by the similarity of CI chondrites with the icy moons of the outer Solar System. Furthermore, there seems to exist a connection to comets: like the comets, CI chondrites accreted silicates, ice and other volatiles, as well as organic compounds (example: Comet Halley).

Although classified as Type 1 chondrites (lacking recognizable chondrules), CIs do contain rare chondrule fragments, anhydrous minerals, and CAIs (less than 1% by volume). Oxygen isotopic compositions of these minerals support their origin as relics of chondrules and refractory inclusions. Before aqueous alteration, CIs likely consisted primarily of chondrules, refractory inclusions, opaque minerals, and anhydrous matrix.

=== Parent Body Processing ===
After formation, CI parent bodies experienced heating that melted ice to create liquid water. This water reacted with primary minerals at temperatures of 50-150 °C, converting them to hydrated phyllosilicates over approximately 15 million years. The alteration occurred in environments with high water/rock ratios (> 0.6-1.2) and neutral to alkaline pH (7–10).

Liquid water must have penetrated the parent body through cracks and fissures and then deposited the water-bearing phases. This process transformed nearly all anhydrous precursor materials into secondary phases. Different CI chondrites show varying alteration levels: Orgueil (containing fine-grained phyllosilicates, ferrihydrite, and corroded magnetite/sulfide grains) represents the most altered, while Ivuna (lacking ferrihydrite) shows less alteration.

Despite this extensive alteration, CI chondrites paradoxically retain the most primitive element abundances. This suggests that either mineral transport during alteration remained limited to mm- to cm-scales, or that the parent body was so thoroughly fluidized that its materials were homogenized—creating a closed system. The debate continues over whether this alteration occurred in free-floating particles before accretion (the nebular hypothesis) or within the parent asteroid (the parent body hypothesis), with the presence of veins and diverse magnetite morphologies suggesting multiple episodes of aqueous activity.

=== Connection to Primitive Asteroids, Comets, and other extraterrestrial particles and bodies ===
CI chondrites are strongly linked to dark, primitive C-type asteroids in the outer asteroid belt based on spectral matches. Recent research has expanded this connection, revealing that some C-complex asteroids without UV-drop-off features and certain X-complex asteroids may also be CI parent bodies. Notably, a significant fraction of C-type asteroids display dehydrated surfaces with spectral features resembling thermally metamorphosed CI-like chondrites.

The asteroids Ryugu and Bennu have provided crucial evidence in this relationship. Initially, reflected spectra from Ryugu acquired by spacecraft appeared most similar to laboratory spectra of heated and partially dehydrated CI chondrites. However, analysis of samples returned from Ryugu revealed mineralogical and chemical properties more closely matching unheated CI chondrites. This discrepancy between remote sensing and direct sampling highlights the complexity of identifying meteorite parent bodies through spectroscopy alone.

Furthermore, several lines of evidence suggest that the Orgueil meteorite, the most studied CI chondrite, may have originated from a comet fragment or extinct cometary nucleus. This hypothesis is supported by Orgueil's high water-to-rock ratio, abundance of hydrated minerals, distinctive oxygen isotopes, and deuterium/hydrogen ratios similar to those measured in Comet Hartley 2. Further evidence comes from reconstructed orbital and atmospheric trajectory analyses of the Orgueil fall. The dwarf planet Ceres has also been proposed as a possible CI parent body, though definitive evidence remains elusive.

While some researchers argue against cometary origins for CI chondrites, these arguments are often based on philosophical positions or circumstantial evidence. Space missions have significantly altered our understanding of comets, particularly the Stardust mission to Comet Wild 2, which returned material with surprisingly asteroidal characteristics. This finding suggests that the boundary between asteroids and comets may be less distinct than previously thought, with considerable mixing between these populations in the early solar system. The possibility that CI chondrites are comet samples is still being postulated.

Micrometeorites and interplanetary dust particles provide additional perspectives on CI chondrite origins. The Earth receives significantly more extraterrestrial material as micrometeorites and dust (by at least one to two orders of magnitude) than as macroscopic meteorites. These smaller particles can better survive atmospheric entry due to their high surface-area-to-volume ratio, overcoming the "fragility filter" that limits CI chondrite recoveries. While most micrometeorites show CM-like compositions, a significant portion display CI-like characteristics. The most primitive dust particles that have survived since the formation of the solar system without significant parent body processing may have compositions even closer to protosolar abundances, including higher volatile content as seen in ultracarbonaceous Antarctic micrometeorites (UCAMMs).

== Notable CI Chondrite Falls and Finds ==
There are very few finds of CI chondrites, with five confirmed specimens and CI-like specimens (see CI-like meteorites). Orgueil in particular has been distributed among collections around the world. Revelstoke, and to a lesser extent Tonk, are small and difficult to study, let alone disperse.

Summary of Falls
| Name | Fall date | Country | TKW | Ref. |
| Alais | 1806 | France | 6 kg | |
| Orgueil | 1864 | France | 14 kg | |
| Tonk | 1911 | India | 7.7g | |
| Ivuna | 1938 | Tanzania | 705g | |
| Revelstoke | 1965 | Canada | 1.6g | |

=== Alais (France, 1806) ===
Alais, which fell near what is now Alès, France on March 15, 1806, holds historical significance as one of the first carbonaceous chondrites recognized as extraterrestrial and oldest CI find. Consequently, pieces weighing 6 kilograms were discovered at Saint-Étienne-de-l'Olm and Castelnau-Valence, small villages southeast of Alès. Alais contains well-crystallized phyllosilicates occurring as coarse fragments and clusters. However, it more closely resembles Orgueil in containing ferrihydrite (suggesting later-stage alteration) and assaying to higher gas levels than typical meteorites.

=== Orgueil (France, 1864) ===
The Orgueil meteorite, which fell near its namesake town in France on May 14, 1864, represents the largest and most extensively studied CI chondrite. This significant fall disintegrated into approximately 20 pieces during atmospheric entry, yielding a total recovered mass of about 14 kg.

Generally considered the most altered CI chondrite, Orgueil became controversial in the 1960s when researchers reported "organized elements" initially proposed as possible microfossils, though later work revealed these were likely mineral structures or terrestrial contamination.

Orgueil displays several distinct chemical signatures, including a high L-isovaline enantiomeric excess (approximately 19%)—significantly higher than in unaltered chondrites. Its amino acid concentration (71 nmol/g) and distribution (predominantly beta-alanine) differ markedly from the complex alpha-amino acids found in CM2 meteorites.

=== Tonk (India, 1911) ===
Tonk fell in Rajasthan, India in 1911. It is one of the less-studied CI chondrites due to limited available material. Total known weight is about 7.7 grams, making it difficult to study in depth or distribute widely to researchers. Like other CI chondrites, Tonk assays to higher gas levels than typical meteorites. It shares the characteristic features of CI chondrites, including extensive aqueous alteration, though detailed studies are limited by the small available sample size

=== Ivuna (Tanzania, 1938) ===
Ivuna, which fell in Tanzania on December 16, 1938, serves as the type specimen for the entire CI group. With a total recovered mass of approximately 705 grams, this meteorite is distinguished by well-crystallized phyllosilicates that often appear as coarse fragments and clusters.

Among CI chondrites, Ivuna represents the least altered specimen, lacking the ferrihydrite found in Alais and Orgueil. Its composition includes 3.31 wt% total carbon (90% organic), 1.59 wt% hydrogen (89% inorganic), and 12.73 wt% total water. Recent oxygen isotope studies of its dolomite and magnetite grains suggest these minerals may have precipitated from the same fluid as similar components in samples from asteroid Ryugu.

=== Revelstoke (Canada, 1965) ===
The Revelstoke CI chondrite fall was in 1965, notable for its very bright fall in Revelstoke, British Columbia. It yielded only two tiny fragments, totaling ~1 gram (>0.03 oz).

=== CI-like meteorites ===
Antarctica has been a significant source of meteorites, including specimens that exhibit similarities to CI chondrites. The first such finds, Yamato 82042 and Y-82162, were discovered in the Yamato Mountains. These meteorites share many characteristics with CI chondrites but also exhibit notable differences. Y-82162 and Y-86029, for instance, contain less water and have bulk oxygen isotopic compositions shifted to higher values, suggesting significant water loss from phyllosilicates due to thermal metamorphism.

In 1992, Ikeda proposed that these Antarctic meteorites, which differ somewhat from non-Antarctic CI chondrites, should be classified as a distinct grouplet. By 2015, the list of CI-like specimens had expanded to include Yamato 86029 (11.8 g), Y-86720, Y-86737 (2.81 g), Y-86789, Y-980115 (772 g), Y-980134 (12.2 g), Belgica 7904, and the desert chondrite Dhofar 1988. King et al. later proposed a separate classification for these meteorites, naming them CY chondrites. In 2023, MacLennan Gravik claimed (using mid-infrared spectroscopy) that asteroid (3200) Phaethon is the parent body of the CY chondrites, further supporting their distinction from CI chondrites. This claim is countered by direct examination of the meteorites.

A key difference between Antarctic CI-like meteorites and CI chondrites is the alteration of phyllosilicates. In many Antarctic specimens, these minerals have undergone dehydration and reversion to silicates, accompanied by an increase in sulfide content. Unlike typical CI chondrites, where magnetite is more abundant, sulfides dominate in CY chondrites. Additionally, these meteorites exhibit the highest recorded oxygen isotope compositions among all meteorites.

Organic analysis of the Yamato chondrites has revealed significantly lower concentrations of amino acids (~3 nmol/g), approximately 25 times lower than in other CI chondrites. The amino acid composition is dominated by proteinogenic amino acids, suggesting terrestrial contamination. Furthermore, thermal history varies between Antarctic CI-like meteorites and traditional CI chondrites. While Ivuna and Orgueil likely never experienced temperatures above 150 °C, Y-86029 and Y-980115 have undergone heating up to 600 °C. The low abundance of γ- and δ-amino acids in the Yamato meteorites suggests that either minimal amino acid synthesis occurred on their parent bodies or that prolonged heating led to near-complete amino acid destruction.

Lately, the meteorite find Oued Chebeika 002, recovered by locals in the Moroccan deserts, appears to be a CI chondrite. Although it was not an observed fall, the arid environment appears to have caused minimal alteration to the sample.

=== Ryugu Reference Sample ===
Samples of asteroid (162173) Ryugu, as selected by the Hayabusa2 mission, appear to be a match to CI meteorites. As the sample was hermetically sealed, it has never been exposed to Earth biota and is claimed for use as a cosmochemical reference.

== Standard reference for cosmic abundances ==
The defining feature of CI meteorites is their chemical composition, rich in volatile elements- richer than any other meteorites. The element assay of CI meteorite is used as a geochemical standard, as it has "a remarkably close relationship" to the makeup of the Sun and greater Solar System. This abundance standard is the measure by which other meteorites, comets, and in some cases the planets themselves (since revised) are assayed.

Goldschmidt noted the primitive (pre-differentiated) compositions of some meteorites, calling it the "cosmic" abundance- he assumed meteorites had arrived from free space, not the Solar System. In turn, the study of such abundances stimulated- then validated- work in nucleosynthesis and stellar physics. In a sense, Goldschmidt's choice of terms may have been borne out: both Solar and CI compositions appear similar to nearby stars as well, and presolar grains exist (though too small to be relevant here).

The CI abundance is more properly linked to the abundances in the solar photosphere. Small differences exist between the solar interior, photosphere, and corona/solar wind. Heavy elements may settle to the interiors of stars (for the Sun, this effect appears low); the corona and thus the solar wind are affected by plasma physics and high-energy mechanisms and are imperfect samples of the Sun. Other issues include the lack of spectral features- and thus, straightforward photospheric observation- of noble gases. Since the CI values are measured directly (first by assay, now by mass spectrometry, and when necessary, neutron activation analysis), they are more precise than solar values, which are subject to (besides the above field effects) spectrophotometric assumptions, including elements with conflicting spectral lines. In particular, when the iron abundances of CIs and the Sun did not match, it was the solar value that was questioned and corrected, not the meteorite number. Solar and CI abundances, for better and for worse, differ in that e. g., chondrites condensed ~4.5 billion years ago and represent some initial planetary states (i. e., the proto-solar abundance), while the Sun continues burning lithium and possibly other elements and continually creating helium from e. g., deuterium.

Issues with CI abundances include heterogeneity (local variation), and bromine and other halogens, which are water-soluble and thus labile. Volatiles, such as noble gases (though see below) and the atmophile elements carbon, nitrogen, oxygen, etc. are lost from minerals and not assumed to hold the Solar correspondence. However, in the modern era the Solar carbon and oxygen measurements have come down significantly. As these are the two most abundant elements after hydrogen and helium, the Sun's metallicity is affected significantly. It is possible that CI chondrites may hold too many volatiles, and the matrix of CM chondrites (excluding chondrules, calcium–aluminium-rich inclusions, etc.), or bulk Tagish Lake, may be a better proxy for the Solar abundance.

== Misclassifications ==
Due to their rarity and importance as geochemical references, there has been significant interest in classifying meteorites as CI chondrites. However, several meteorites once thought to be CI chondrites have later been reclassified.

| Name | Description |
|---|---|
| Bench Crater Sample | During the 1969 Apollo 12 mission, a meteorite was discovered on the Moon and initially thought to be a CI chondrite. However, further analysis revealed that it was, in fact, a closely related CM chondrite. |
| Kaidun | In 1983, Kallemeyn and Kerridge suggested that the Kaidun meteorite might be a CI chondrite. At the time, the CR chondrite group was still under debate, making CI a more fitting classification. However, Kaidun is now officially classified as a CR2 chondrite. |
| Tagish Lake Meteorite | The Tagish Lake meteorite, which fell in 2000 in the Yukon Territory, was initially considered a CI chondrite but was later reclassified as C2-ungrouped (ung) due to the presence of chondrules. While its carbon and nitrogen isotopes are similar to CI chondrites, its oxygen isotopes are not. Tagish Lake is enriched in ^{17}O but deficient in ^{18}O, aligning it more closely with CM chondrites. |
| NWA 5958 | In 2011, a research team suggested that the Northwest Africa 5958 meteorite (NWA 5958) was a CI chondrite. However, subsequent studies reported that it does not fit this classification. NWA 5958 is now officially classified as C2-ungrouped (ung). |

== Importance ==
Compared to all the meteorites found to date, CI chondrites possess the strongest similarity to the elemental distribution within the original solar nebula. For this reason they are also called primitive meteorites. Except for the volatile elements carbon, hydrogen, oxygen and nitrogen, as well as the noble gases, which are deficient in the CI chondrites, the elemental ratios are nearly identical. Lithium is another exception, it is enriched in the meteorites (lithium in the Sun is involved during nucleosynthesis and therefore diminished).

Because of this strong similarity, it has become customary in petrology to normalize rock samples versus CI chondrites for a specific element, i. e. the ratio rock/chondrite is used to compare a sample with the original solar matter. Ratios > 1 indicate an enrichment, ratios < 1 a depletion of the sample. The normalization process is used mainly in spider diagrams for the rare-earth elements.

CI chondrites also have a high carbon content. Besides inorganic carbon compounds like graphite, diamond and carbonates, organic carbon compounds are represented. For instance, amino acids have been detected. This is a very important fact in the ongoing search for the origin of life.

== See also ==
- Glossary of meteoritics
- Meteorite classification
