= Louis Jacques Thénard =

French chemist (1777–1857)

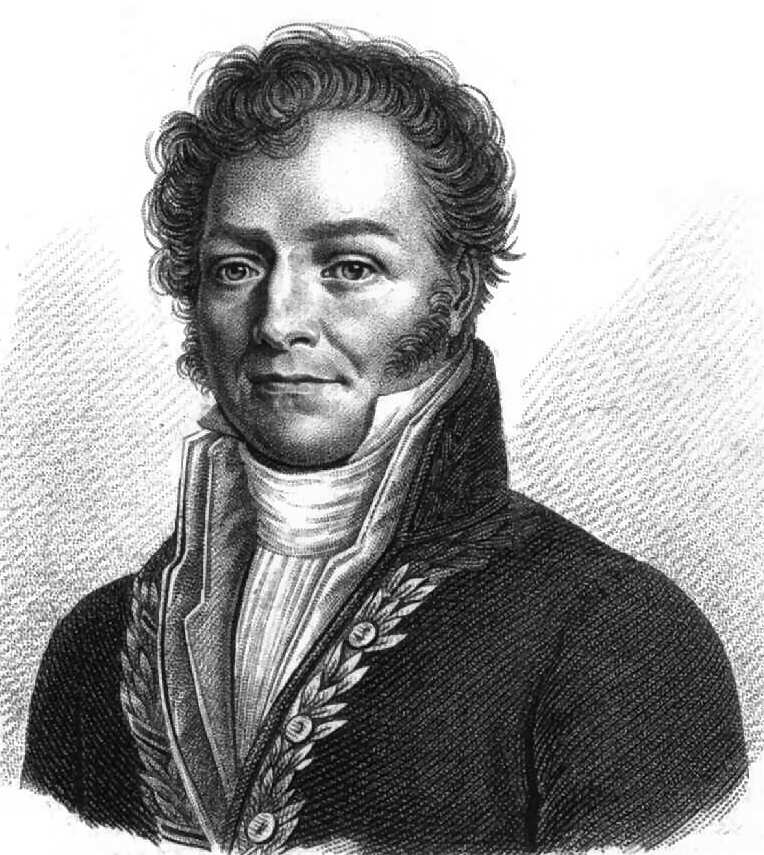
- Born: 4 May 1777; La Louptière, Champagne (present-day Aube), France
- Died: 21 June 1857 (aged 80); Paris, France
- Education: Collège Stéphane-Mallarmé de Sens
- Known for: Discovery of hydrogen peroxide Co-discovery of boron Brin process Thénard's blue
- Awards: ForMemRS (1824); Galvanism Prize (1809)
- Scientific career
- Fields: Chemistry
- Workplaces: École Polytechnique
- Academic advisors: Antoine François Fourcroy; Louis Nicolas Vauquelin
- Notable students: Joseph Liouville

Louis Jacques Thénard (4 May 1777 – 21 June 1857) was a French chemist. He is the co-discoverer of boron and discoverer of hydrogen peroxide

== Life ==
=== Early years and education ===
He was born in a farm cottage near Nogent-sur-Seine in the Champagne district the son of a farm worker. In the post-Revolution French educational system, most boys received scholarships for education up to age 14, and this allowed him to be educated at the academy at Sens. He then went at the age of sixteen to study pharmacy in Paris. There he attended the lectures of Antoine François Fourcroy and Louis Nicolas Vauquelin. He was allowed into Vauquelin's laboratory even though he was unable to pay the monthly fee of 20 francs, due to the requests of Vauquelin's sisters. But his progress was so rapid that in two or three years he was able to take his master's place at the lecture-table, and Fourcroy and Vauquelin were so satisfied with his performance that they procured for him a school appointment in 1797 as a teacher of chemistry, and in 1798 one as répétiteur at the École Polytechnique.

=== Career ===
In 1804 Vauquelin resigned his professorship at the Collège de France and successfully used his influence to obtain the appointment for Thénard, who six years later, after Fourcroy's death, was further elected to the chairs of chemistry at the École Polytechnique and the Faculté des Sciences. He also succeeded Fourcroy as member of the academy. In 1821, he was elected a foreign member of the Royal Swedish Academy of Sciences. In 1825 he received the title of baron from Charles X, and in 1832 Louis Philippe made him a peer of France. From 1827 to 1830 he represented the département of Yonne in the chamber of deputies, and as vice-president of the conseil superieur de l'instruction publique, he exercised a great influence on scientific education in France.

Above all things Thénard was a teacher; as he himself said, the professor, the assistants, the laboratory — everything must be sacrificed to the students. Like most great teachers he published a textbook, and his Traité de chimie élémentaire, théorique et pratique (4 vols., Paris, 1813–16), which served as a standard for a quarter of a century, perhaps did even more for the advance of chemistry than his numerous original discoveries.

He died in Paris on 21 June 1857.

== Research ==
Careful analysis led him to dispute some of Claude Louis Berthollet's theoretical views regarding the composition of the metallic oxides, and he also showed Berthollet's "zoonic acid" to be impure acetic acid (1802). In response, Berthollet invited him to become a member of the Society of Arcueil.

In 1806 he analysed the chemical composition of the Alais meteorite, which fell in Alès on 15 March 1806. This was the first carbonaceous chondrite to be discovered. Thénard found a high carbon content of 2.5 per cent.

His first original paper (1799) was on the compounds of arsenic and antimony with oxygen and sulphur. In 1807, he began important research into ethers. His researches on sebacic acid (1802) and on bile (1807) deserve mention as well, as does his discovery of hydrogen peroxide (1818). In 1799 he developed the pigment known as Thénard's blue in response to a request by Jean-Antoine-Claude Chaptal for a cheap colouring matter.

== Honours and awards ==
Soon after his appointment as répétiteur at the École Polytechnique he began a lifelong friendship with Joseph Louis Gay-Lussac, and the two carried out many research projects together. For their research, Gay-Lussac and Thénard would receive 30,000 francs from Napoleon in the third and last installment of the Galvanism Prize.

After his death a statue was erected to his memory at Sens in 1861, and in 1865 the name of his native village was changed to La Louptière-Thénard.

The mineral Thénardite was named after him

Thénard name is one of the 72 names inscribed on the Eiffel Tower.

== Works ==
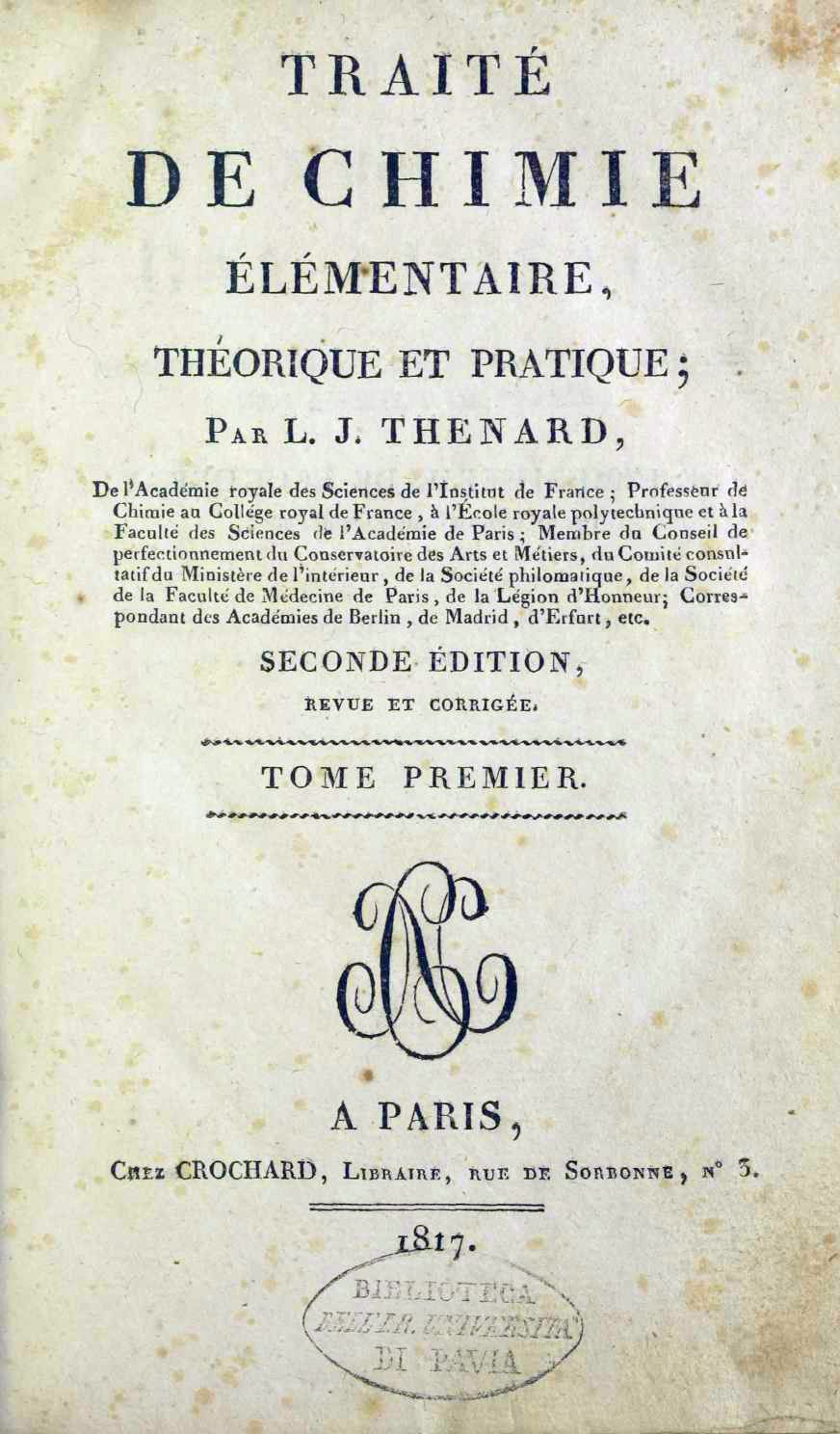
Traité de chimie élémentaire, théorique et pratique, 1817

- Traité de chimie élémentaire, théorique et pratique (in French). Vol. 1. Paris: Crochard. 1817.
  - Traité de chimie élémentaire, théorique et pratique (in French). Vol. 2. Paris: Crochard. 1817.
  - Traité de chimie élémentaire, théorique et pratique (in French). Vol. 4. Paris: Crochard. 1818.

== See also ==
- Phosphorus trichloride
