= Society of Arcueil =

The Society of Arcueil was a circle of French scientists who met regularly on summer weekends between 1806 and 1822 at the country houses of Claude Louis Berthollet and Pierre Simon Laplace at Arcueil, then a village 3 miles south of Paris.

== Members ==
In 1807, when the first collection of "Mémoires de Physique et de Chimie de la Société d'Arcueil" was published, a list of contributing members read:

- Claude Louis Berthollet (1748-1822)
- Pierre Simon Laplace (1749-1827)
- Friedrich Heinrich Alexander von Humboldt (1769-1859)
- Louis Jacques Thenard (1777-1857)
- Joseph Louis Gay-Lussac (1778-1850)
- Jean Baptiste Biot (1774-1862)
- Augustin Pyramus de Candolle (1778-1841)
- Hippolyte-Victor Collet-Descotils (1773-1815)
- Amedée Barthélemy Berthollet (1780-1810)

In the course of the following years they were joined by:

- Étienne-Louis Malus (1775-1812)
- Dominique François Jean Arago (1786-1853)
- Jacques Etienne Bérard (1789-1869)
- Jean Antoine Chaptal (1756-1832)
- Pierre Louis Dulong (1785-1835)
- Siméon Denis Poisson (1781-1840)

== Inspiration ==
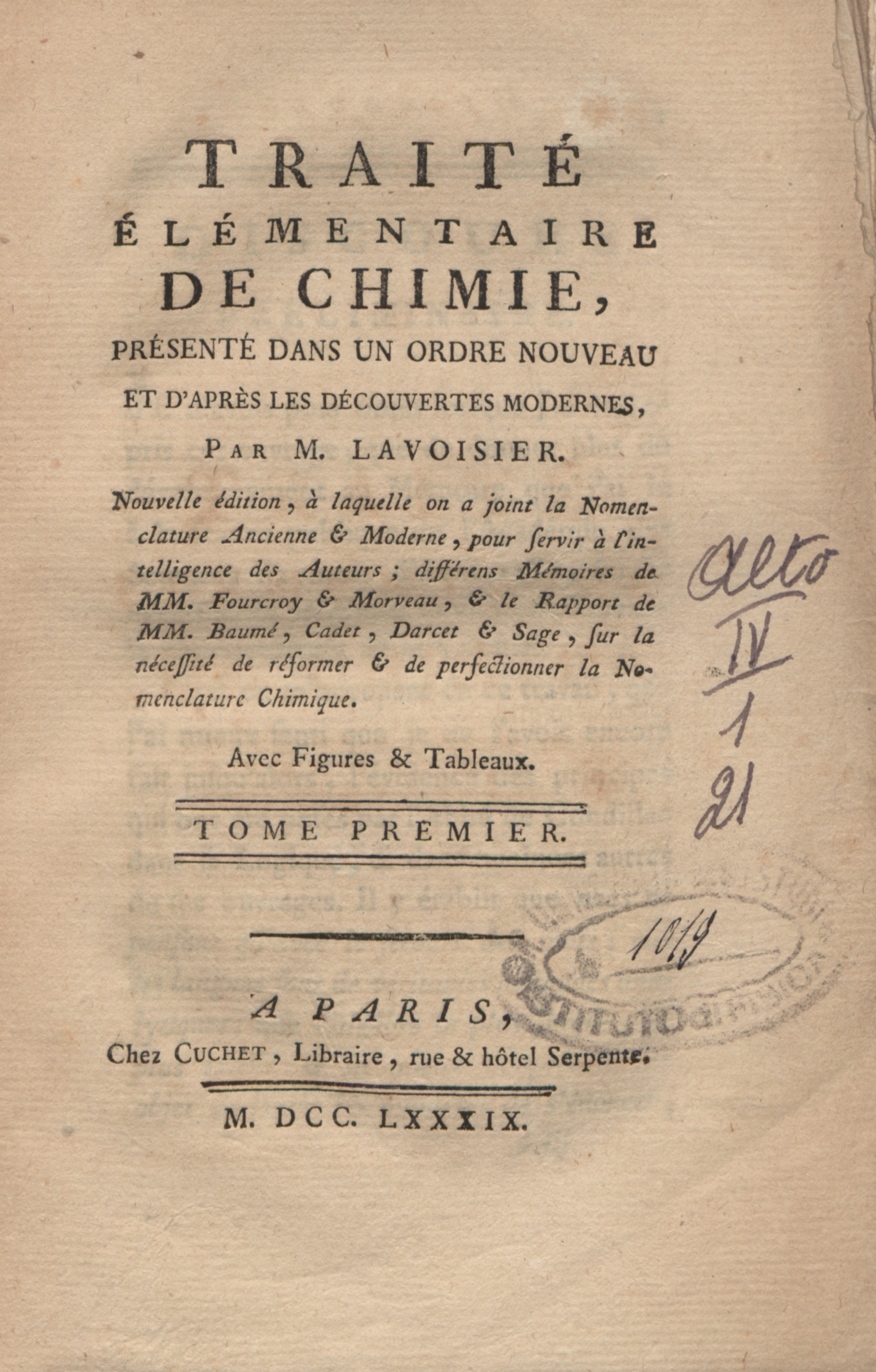
Traité élémentaire de chimie

Antoine Lavoisier had initiated the practice of informal deliberation with his fellow scientists, including his junior assistants, in his laboratory at the Paris Arsenal.

"If at any time I have adopted, without acknowledgement the experiments of M.Berthollet, M.Fourcroy, M.de la Place, M.Monge (...) it is owing to (...) the habit of communicating our ideas, our observations and our way of thinking to each other (establishing) between us a sort of community of opinions in which it is often difficult for everyone to know his own."
(Lavoisier in: "Traité Élémentaire de Chimie", 1789)

Laplace, and Berthollet with his open laboratory, continued this spirit of fellowship at Arcueil. They were the senior moderators in a scientific debate of novel magnitude; combining the framework of physico-mathematical model (Laplace) with experimental investigation (Berthollet).

== Roots ==
The roots of the active progress of the Society of Arcueil lay with Napoleon Bonaparte's special attention to sciences in general and - as an artillery officer - to mathematics in particular.

Laplace had been Bonaparte's final examiner at the Ecole Militaire (September 1785) where Gaspard Monge, his professor, had encouraged him to finish the two-year course of mathematics in one.

Napoleon became acquainted with Berthollet during his campaign in Italy, when Berthollet and Monge were part of the commission sent by the French Directory to select and dispatch Italian art treasures, manuscripts and scientific documents to Paris.

Laplace, Berthollet and Monge became instrumental in having Napoleon elected to the First Class of the Institut de France (the class directing the exact sciences) when Lazare Carnot's place fell vacant in 1797.

Napoleon in turn invited them to follow him to Egypt (1798-1799) and instructed Berthollet to conduct the recruitment of the scientists that were to compose the "Institut d'Egypte".

The way Berthollet effectively directed the practical installation of the Institute at Qassim Bey's Palace in Caïro, cemented the friendship with Bonaparte in a way that proved its worth in the patronage of the Arcueil Society. When Berthollet, in 1807, concluded that the arrangement for research facilities at Arcueil had cost him more than he could afford, Napoleon, alerted by Laplace and Monge, immediately lend him 150.000 francs to break even.

The informality of the "Institut d'Egypte" found its continuance at Arcueil where Berthollet from his Egyptian-decorated study remained in charge of the publication of the "Description de l'Egypte (1809)" (ref: Crosland, 1967).

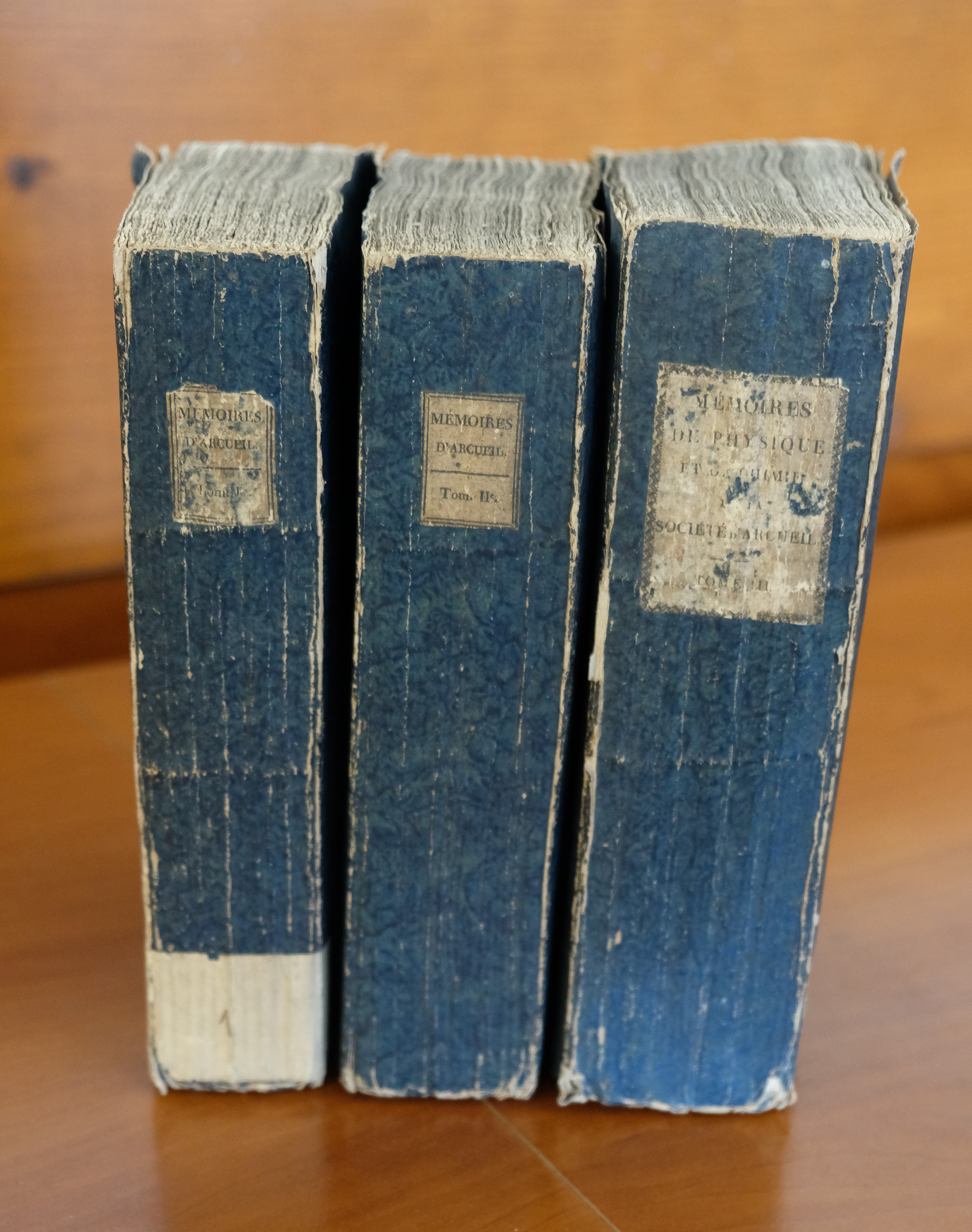
Volumes I-III of Mémoires de physique et de chimie de la Société d’Arcuei, published by the Society of Arcueil (1807-1817)

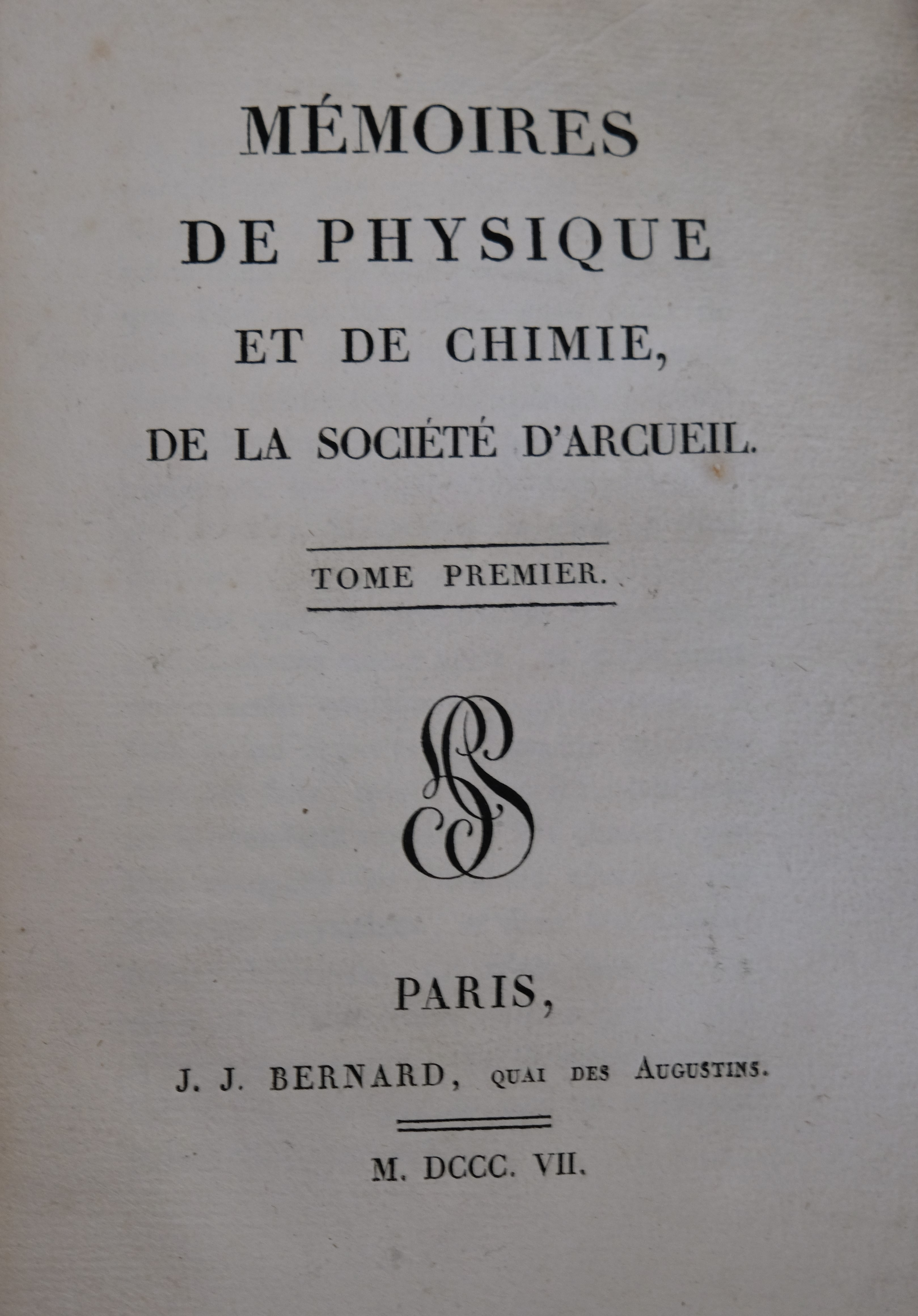
Title page to volume I of Mémoires de physique et de chimie de la Société d’Arcuei (1807)

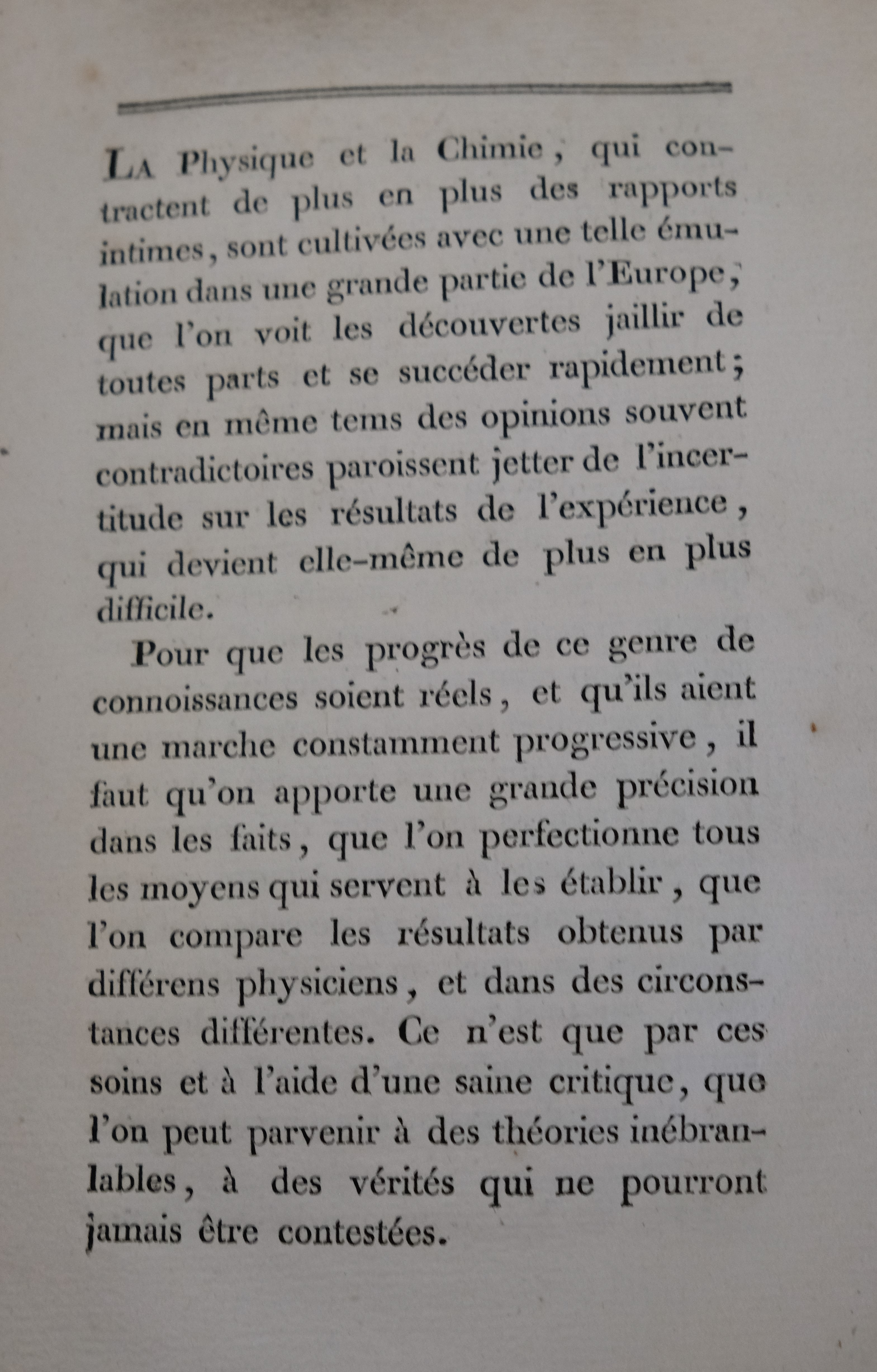
Introduction to volume I of Mémoires de physique et de chimie de la Société d’Arcuei (1807)

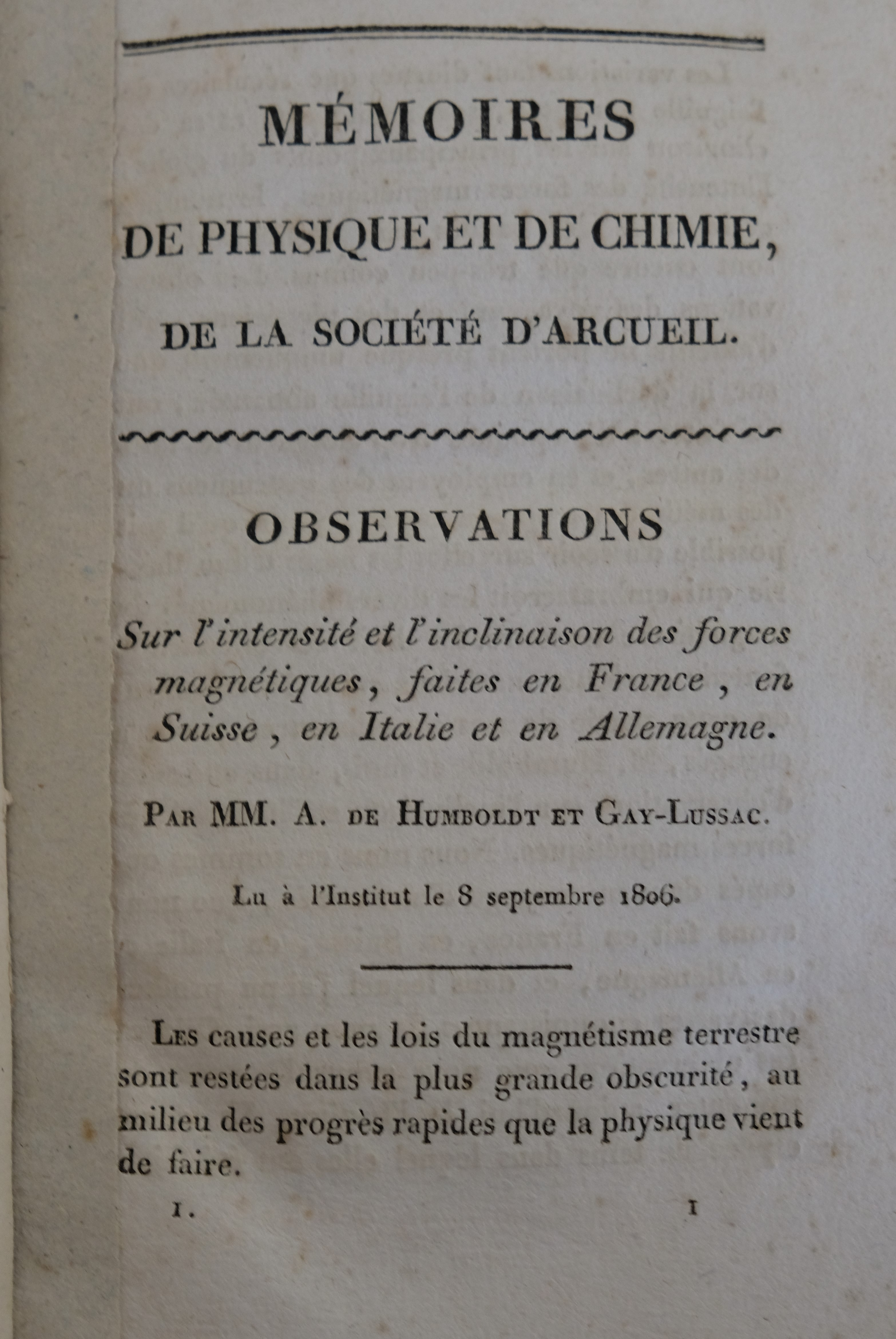
First page to volume I of Mémoires de physique et de chimie de la Société d’Arcuei (1807)

== Science Under Bonaparte ==
The quantitative applications of the new science of chemistry had important significance for the state economy.

The exploitation of beet sugar, for example, was developed with the boycott of English trade in mind. From the publication of Franz Achard's letter on beet sugar in Annales de chimie et de physique (Bruxelles:Van Mons, 1799) and the first presentation of a sample to Napoleon during a session of the First Class of the Institute (June 25, 1800) till the first viable production by Jules Paul Benjamin Delessert in 1812, the subject was one of the scientific priorities in France (see also: Joseph Proust on grape sugar).

The industrial fabrication of dye from home grown indigo plant (distinct from woad) at Toulouse was a direct heritage from the "Institut d'Egypte."

Mathematical instruments were a special favourite with Napoleon, and were often awarded medals at the industrial fairs held at the instigation of Chaptal. Members of the Society of Arcueil were frequently invited to judge on such occasions.

In 1806, at the third exhibition in the series, some 1.400 participants attended; up from 220 in 1801. Special attention was given to textile printing adapted by Christophe Oberkampf and his nephew Samuel Widmer with the introduction of roller instead of block printing. This particular industrial process integrated the bleaching by chlorine (eau de javel) invented by Berthollet, as well as the application of new dyeing methods (Samuel Widmers invention of a solid green dye). In 1806 Oberkampf's factory printed fabrics at the rate of 7,5 metres a minute, a viable alternative to English import.

Laplace and Monge were also instructed to supervise Robert Fulton's experiments with the Nautilus (1800),subsidized in France.

Following Volta's visit to Paris in 1801 important work on the Voltaic pile, involving the Arcueil circle, was carried out under Bonaparte's auspices rewarding Paul Erman, Humphry Davy, Gay-Lussac and Louis Jacques Thenard in the process.

The scientific work in general was of first importance to the education at the Ecole Polytechnique, the home base of many Arcueil scientists.

The enhancing of the quality of iron and steel, with Collet-Descotils -the precursor in the discovery of iridium- in charge as chief engineer at the "Ecole des Mines", and above all the development of gunpowder were of prime military significance.

The French expertise in explosives was well judged by the Allies when later they dispatched Jöns Jacob Berzelius to Paris to update general knowledge. In 1819 he spent two full months as a guest of Berthollet in the laboratory at Arcueil experimenting, but above all sounding Pierre Dulong whose memoir on a new detonating substance (nitrogen trichloride) had appeared in the 1817 volume of "Mémoires de Physique et de Chimie de la Société d'Arcueil" (André-Marie Ampère had already briefed Humphry Davy on prior stages (1811-1813) of Dulong's invention).

== "Memoires..." ==
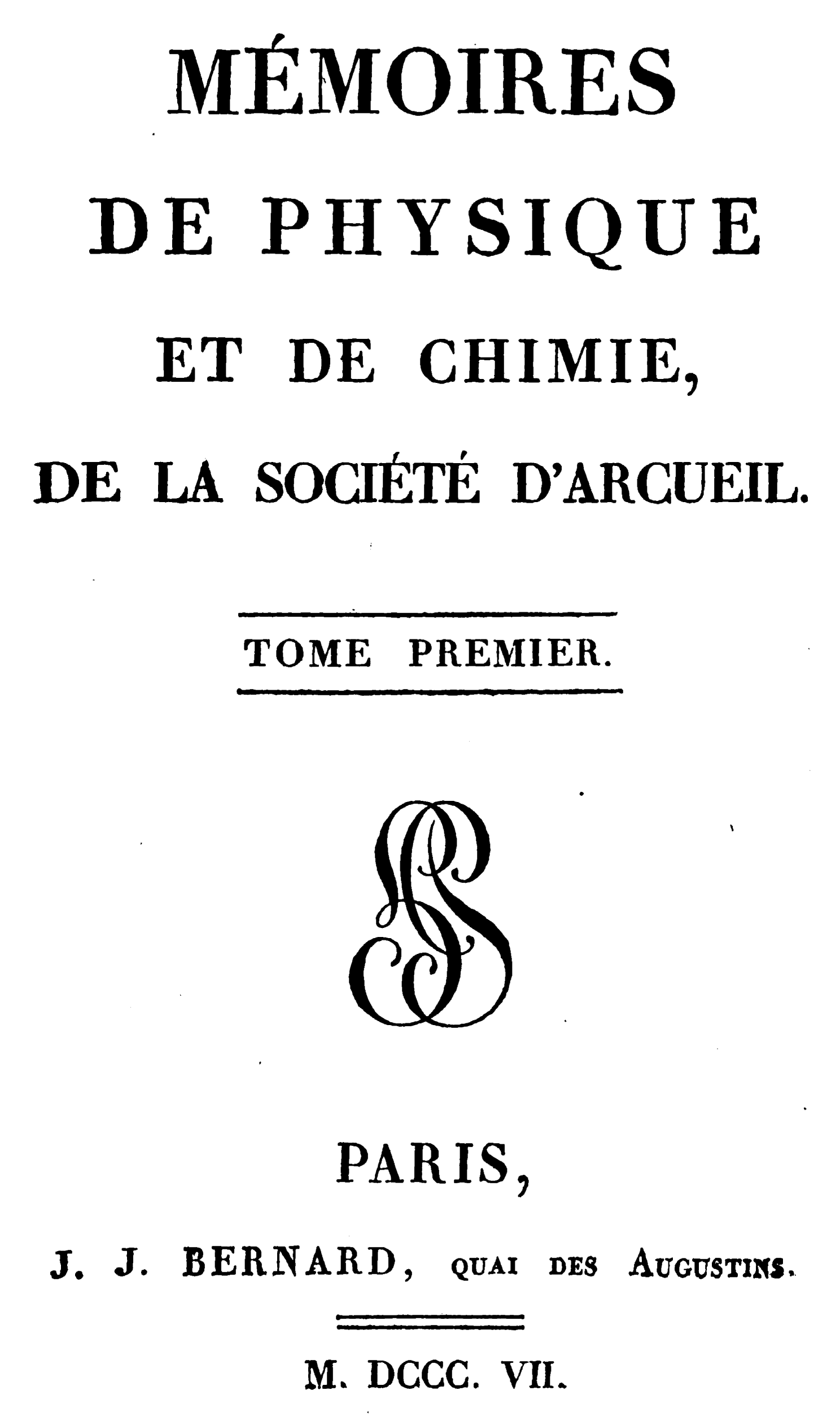
Title page of the volume 1 from 1807

There were three volumes of "Mémoires de Physique et de Chimie de la Société d'Arcueil": 1807, 1809 and 1817 -the last date testifying to the political difficulties following the demise of Napoleon I of France.

The "Mémoires..." published some important new ideas: Malus on the polarisation of light (1809, 1817); Gay-Lussac on the free expansion of gases (1807); Humboldt and Gay-Lussac on terrestrial magnetism (1807); Gay-Lussac's law of combining volumes of gases (1809); Thenard and Biot's observation on the comparison of aragonite and calcite (one of the earliest proofs of dimorphism)(1809); Gay-Lussac and Thenard on the discovery of the amides of metal (1809); Candolle on heliotropism (1817).

Equally important was the special thread, woven into the overall discourse, that held together the brilliant cross-reference among friends.

== Foreign visitors ==
There had often been attempts to correspond between the French and the English scientists notwithstanding the state of war between their countries.

At the first opportunity the English correspondents of Arcueil returned to Paris, among them John Leslie (1814) and Charles Blagden (1814, 1816, 1817) who died of apoplexy (1820) during a visit to Berthollet at Arcueil. Mary Somerville who wrote a popular account of Laplace's "Mécanique Céleste" dined at Arcueil with her scientific "heroes" (1817).

Jöns Jacob Berzelius had already been invited by Berthollet to come and study at Arcueil in 1810, but it was not till 1818 that the Swedish government judged it appropriate for him to travel to France. At Arcueil Berzelius engaged in a steadfast friendship with Dulong.

In 1820 Dulong wrote to Berzelius:

"Despite the objections of M.Laplace and some others, I am convinced that this (atomic) theory is the most important concept of the century and in the next twenty years it will bring about an incalculable extension to all parts of the physical sciences"

It was the testimony of a changing mood and when John Dalton, who had strong differences of opinion with the Society, visited Arcueil in 1822, he received a hearty welcome. It was the last major social event for the Society of Arcueil.

Berthollet died on November 6, 1822, and with him went an inspiring power of adherence.

== Post Scriptum ==
The Society of Arcueil however, through the younger generation, was still to illuminate such work as that of Liebig, Pasteur, Fresnel, Niepce, Daguerre, Léon Foucault ... as well as many others in the field of scientific education.

== Sources ==
- Maurice Crosland: "The Society of Arcueil -A view of French Science at the time of Napoleon I" Cambridge Mass.: Harvard University Press, 1967
