= Jean-Antoine Chaptal =

French chemist and physician (1756–1832)

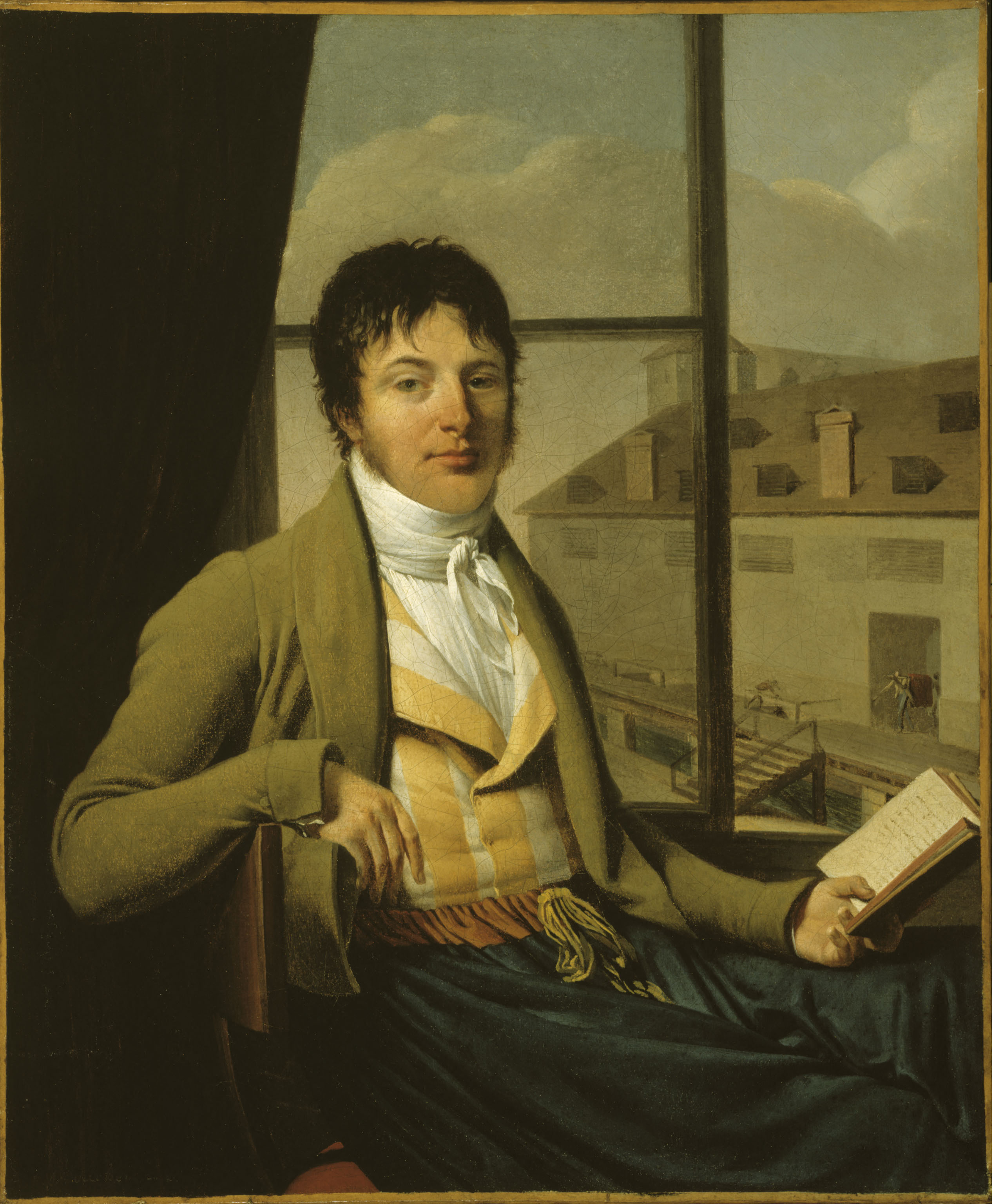
- Portrait by Louis-André-Gabriel Bouchet (1801)
- Born: 5 June 1756; Nojaret, Gévaudan, Kingdom of France
- Died: 29 July 1832 (aged 76); Paris, France
- Resting place: Père Lachaise Cemetery
- Scientific career
- Fields: chemistry

Jean-Antoine Chaptal, comte de Chanteloup (French pronunciation: [ʒɑ̃ ɑ̃twan ʃaptal]; 5 June 1756 – 29 July 1832) was a French chemist, physician, agronomist, industrialist, statesman, educator and philanthropist.

Chaptal was involved in early industrialization in France under Napoleon and during the Bourbon Restoration. He was a founder and the first president of the Society for the Encouragement of National Industry. He was an organizer of industrial expositions held in Paris. He compiled a study surveying the condition and needs of French industry in the early 1800s. Chaptal published practical essays on the uses of chemistry. He was an industrial producer of hydrochloric, nitric and sulfuric acids, and was sought after as a technical consultant for the manufacture of gunpowder. Chaptal published works which drew on Antoine Lavoisier's theoretical chemistry to make advances in wine-making. Chaptal promoted adding sugar to increase the final alcohol content of wines, now referred to as "chaptalization".

== Biography ==
=== Early life ===
Chaptal was born in Nojaret (Lozère) in southwestern France, the youngest son of small landowners, Antoine Chaptal and Françoise Brunel. Chaptal's record at the area collèges of Mende and Rodez encouraged his uncle, Claude Chaptal who was a physician at Montpellier, to finance him through medical school at the University of Montpellier, 1774–1776.

After receiving his degree of doctor of medicine, he persuaded his uncle to continue his support for postgraduate study in medicine and chemistry at Paris. He attended courses on chemistry at the École de Médicine given by Jean-Baptiste-Michel Bucquet. He returned to Montpellier in 1780 to a salaried chair in chemistry at the university. Chaptal then wrote Mémoires de chimie (1781) reporting his early studies in chemistry.

In 1781, he married Anne-Marie Lajard, the daughter of a rich cotton merchant at Montpellier. With his wife's dowry, and capital supplied by his uncle, he then established a chemical factory at Montpellier. The enterprise involved manufacturing sulfuric, nitric, hydrochloric and other acids, alum, white lead and soda, among other substances. By 1787 Montpellier became a center of innovation for the production of industrial chemicals in France.

Chaptal reported regularly on his studies in chemistry applied to industry and agriculture for the Société Royale des Sciences de Montpellier. He communicated with the Controller General's department in Paris in 1782 regarding his projects for bottle-making, dyeing and the manufacture of artificial soda. His articles were published by the Académie Royale des Sciences and in the Annales de chimie.

In 1790, Chaptal published the scientific treatise, Elements of Chemistry which introduced the term "nitrogen".

=== Revolution ===
Reflecting later in his life on the Revolution in France, Chaptal wrote: "In the widespread confusion and flood of all passions, the wise man will consider carefully the role he must play; it will appear to him equally dangerous in the midst of such agitation to remain either inactive or to participate."

Chaptal initially welcomed the Revolution. But, in 1793, he led opposition in Montpellier against the perceived extremism of the Committee of Public Safety of the National Convention in Paris. As a consequence, he was arrested, imprisoned, and in danger of being guillotined. Fortunately for Chaptal, his value to the nation as an industrial chemist was deemed sufficient to excuse his politics, in part because the revolutionary armies required gunpowder.

In the Spring of 1794, by order of Lazare Carnot, the Minister of War, Chaptal was charged with the management of the major gunpowder factory at Grenelle in Paris. Chaptal recounts in his memoirs how, with the help of his fellow scientists—Berthollet, Fourcroy, Guyton and others—he introduced new and more rapid methods for refining potassium nitrate (at Saint-Germain-des-Prés) and produced increased amounts of gunpowder at Grenelle.

After Thermidor (July 1794), Chaptal spent about four years mainly in Montpellier teaching at the medical school and rebuilding his chemicals industry. He estimated his losses because of the Revolution at 500,000 francs, almost all of his fortune. In 1798 he decided to move to Paris, leaving his business enterprises in Montpellier to his long-time partner, Étienne Bérard. Captal was elected to the Institut (24 May 1798) and became a member of the editorial board of the Annales de chimie. He then began to build up a second large chemicals industry near Paris at Ternes, an enterprise managed after 1808 by his son, Jean-Baptiste Chaptal (1782–1833).

By 1795, at the newly established École Polytechnique in Paris, Chaptal shared the teaching of courses in pure and applied chemistry with Claude-Louis Berthollet. In 1798, Chaptal was elected a member of the prestigious Chemistry Section of the Institut de France, he became president of the section in 1802. Napoleon appointed him Minister of Interior on November 6, 1800.

=== Consulate, Empire, and Restoration ===
Napoleon's coup d'état of 18 Brumaire (9 November 1799) lead to the establishment of the Consulate (1799–1804) and opened up a new career for Chaptal. Jean-Jacques Cambacérès was one of Chaptal's friends from Montpellier. There was also Claude-Louis Berthollet, by then a close friend of Napoleon, who called Berthollet "my chemist": they were on the Egyptian Expedition together in 1798–1799. Berthollet could vouch for Chaptal's remarkable abilities and dedication to using science for the advancement of agriculture, commerce and industry. Napoleon was "prejudiced in favour of men of science" for positions in his government. Napoleon's first Minister of Interior (1799) was Berthollet's friend, Pierre-Simon Laplace, a scientist and mathematician and a poor administrator. He was replaced after six weeks by Napoleon's younger brother, Lucien Bonaparte. Chaptal was then moved into position, first with appointment to Napoleon's Council of State, then acting Minister of Interior (6 November 1800), and finally confirmed in the position (21 January 1801). Chaptal remained in this office until his resignation on 6 August 1804.

When Chaptal took over at the Ministry of Interior, ten years of Revolution and war had produced much disruption. Chaptal's work focussed on reconstruction and reorganization across multiple accumulated civic and infrastructure problems. Chaptal worked to design and implement a new administrative structure and a new primary and secondary educational system. Chaptal created a Bureau of Statistics for his ministry to gather basic data from each of the departments on population and the condition of agriculture, commerce and industry. Chaptal sponsored the formation of Councils of Agriculture, Arts and Commerce in each of France's departments (1801); Chambers of Commerce were reestablished in 23 of the largest cities (1802) and Chambres Consultatives des Arts et Manufactures were organized in 150 of the smaller urban areas (1803).

Chaptal's believed that government should "protect and encourage industry, open new markets for its products and defend it against undue foreign competition." Chaptal was an admirer of Adam Smith's laissez-faire doctrines, but also believed in state sponsorship of industrialization. He believed that his ministry should play an active role in forging a new industrial order capable of competing with England. In his approach, scientists, entrepreneurs, artisans, workers, farmers and government officials would work together and government would mediate private interests for the public good.

Chaptal was proud of the 1801 establishment of the Société d'Encouragement pour l'industrie nationale, patterned after the successful English society founded in London in 1754, the Society for the Encouragement of Arts, Manufactures and Commerce. Chaptal was the president of the new French association. The society was financed by member subscriptions. It offered prizes and published a Bulletin to encourage discoveries useful to industry and new products. Closely related to this initiative, Chaptal resumed François de Neufchâteau's plan for periodic expositions in Paris of the products of industry. The first Exposition des produits de l'industrie française had been held on the Champs-de-Mars in 1798 (110 exhibits); under Chaptal's guidance, the number of exhibitors increased for the next three expositions held at the Louvre in 1801, 1802 and 1806. Napoleon was in attendance with Chaptal for the distribution of awards at the 1801 exposition (229 exhibits).

Emmanuel-Anatole Chaptal (1861–1943) wrote that his great-grandfather was "the voice of commerce, agriculture and industry" for Napoleon. Chaptal resigned as Minister of Interior on August 6, 1804. Napoleon awarded Chaptal the Legion of Honor and an important place in the Senate. Chaptal wrote to Napoleon that he wanted to return to his scientific endeavors.

In 1802, Chaptal purchased the Château de Chanteloup and its extensive grounds in Touraine, near Amboise. He raised merino sheep and experimented there in his later years on a model farm for the cultivation of sugar beets. At Chanteloup, Chaptal wrote his applied science reports, entertained notables and made himself available for consultations. He had chemical factories there at Ternes and Nanterre. Chaptal was doing well producing a variety of industrial acids, alum and soda. In 1804 Chaptal bought a new home in Paris, the Hôtel de Mailly, at No.70 rue de Grenelle-Saint-Germain. He began to frequent meetings of the Society of Arcueil, an association of scientists who gathered at the homes of Berthollet and Laplace in Arcueil. Berthollet was Chaptal's close friend for forty years. The meetings at his home at Arcueil were a way for Chaptal to keep up-to-date with discoveries in pure science. Napoleon named Chaptal Count of the Empire (1808) and Count of Chanteloup (1810).

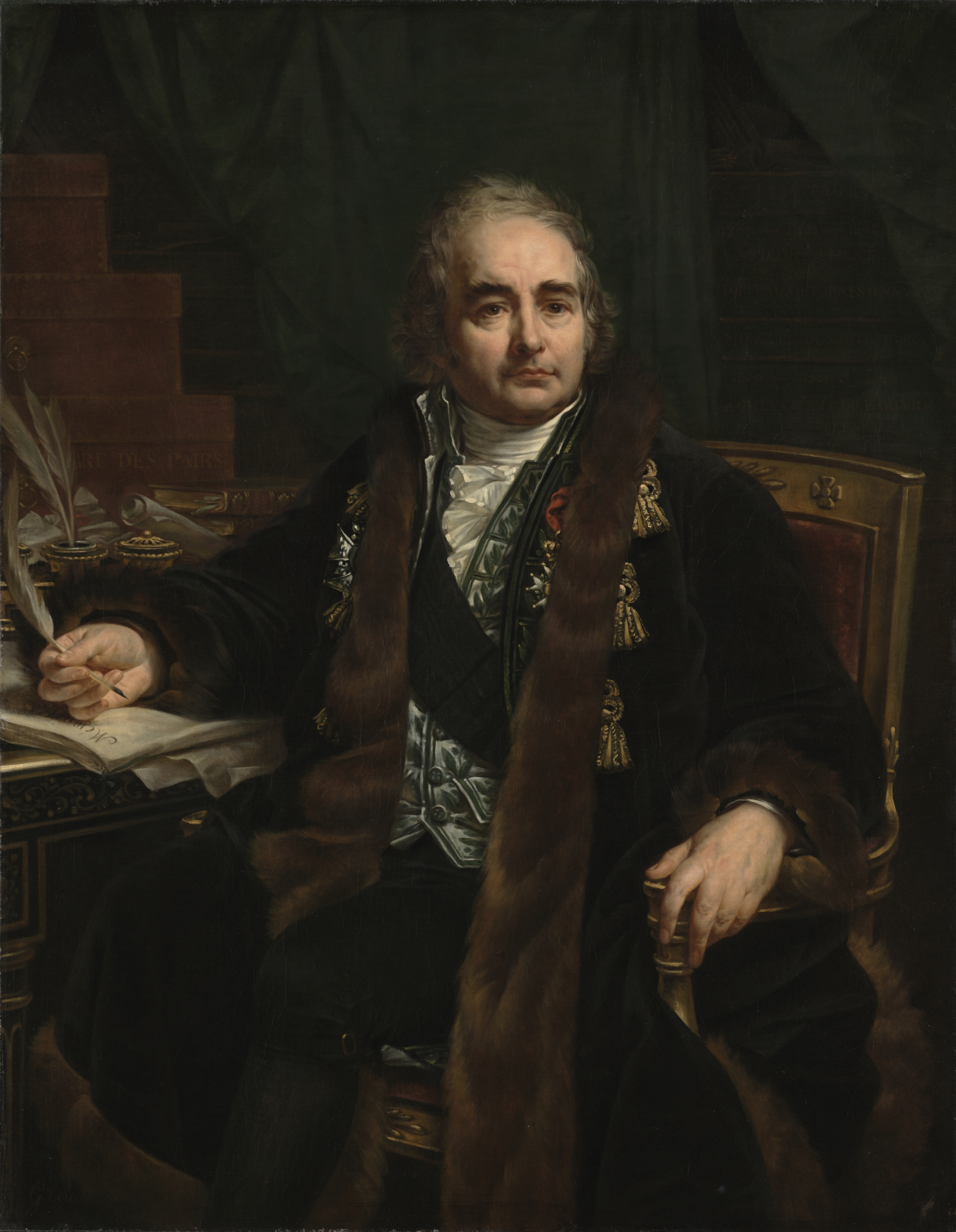
Portrait of Jean-Antoine Chaptal (1824) by Antoine-Jean Gros

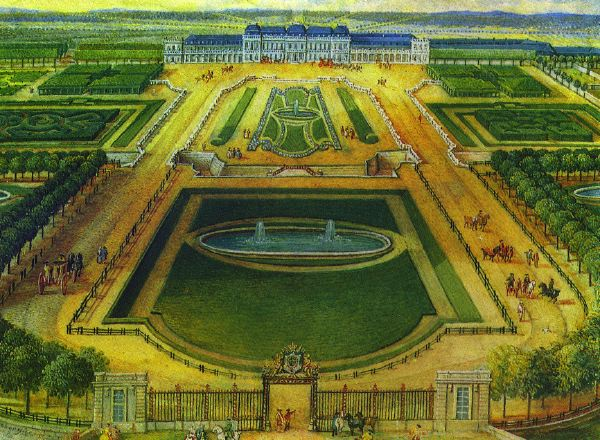
Château de Chanteloup

Chaptal was called to Paris when the French economy experienced a downturn in 1810–1811. Napoleon brought in Chaptal as his key consultant for a special Conseil d'Administration du commerce et des manufactures (6 June 1810). The other members were the Ministers of Interior and Foreign Affairs, plus the Director General of Customs, Jean-Baptiste Collin de Sussy, Napoleon's "douanier par excellence." In addition, two sixty-member advisory councils of leading manufacturers and merchants were organized (7 June 1810) and attached to the Ministry of Interior, then under Count Montalivet: a Conseil général des Manufactures and a Conseil général de Commerce. The advisory councils of manufacturers and merchants had no influence on Napoleon. Chaptal's vision of a new industrial order in France that would bring scientists, business leaders and government officials together had to give way.

Chaptal was called back during the Hundred Days (March–June, 1815) to serve as Napoleon's Minister of Agriculture, Commerce and Industry. Shortly after, Napoleon was defeated at the Battle of Waterloo and exiled to St. Helena. Chaptal temporarily returned to his Chanteloup estate when Louis XVIII assumed the throne. Chaptal declined an invitation by the American consul to move to the United States of America. Chaptal's turned over the management of his chemical industries to his son. At Chanteloup, Chaptal focused on leisure, writing and farming.

Chaptal eventually resumed his position as president of the Society for the Encouragement of National Industry and organizer of industrial expositions (1819, 1823, 1827). In 1817 he published a lengthy memoir on the high price of coal in France that provoked a serious government inquiry into the coal tariff of 1816 and its benefits for the Anzin Coal Company in the Department of Nord. In 1818, with the Duc de la Rochefoucauld-Liancourt, and Paris bankers Benjamin Delessert, Casimir Perier and others, Chaptal helped to found the first French savings bank, the Caisse d'Épargne et de Prévoyance de Paris. In 1819 he was appointed to the Restoration's Chamber of Peers.

With Joseph Degérando, Benjamin Delessert and Scipion Perier, Chaptal organized a society to improve primary school instruction (1815). He also helped found two important business schools in Paris, the École Speciale de Commerce (1816) and the École Centrale des Arts et Manufactures (1828). As a member of the Chamber of Peers, Chaptal supervised the budget of the Conservatory of Arts and Sciences. Chaptal was a member of national and international scientific societies.

In 1819 he was named by Louis XVIII to the Restoration's Chamber of Peers. In 1819, Chaptal reflected on his career:

If I might be permitted to speak for myself, I would say that I have lived in workshops (ateliers) and in the midst of artists for forty years; that I have created important businesses; that the general administration of commerce, agriculture and industry was conferred on me during my ministry; that the sessions of the Académie des Sciences, and those of the Société d'Encouragement which I presided over since its founding, allowed me to see and judge every day the progress and state . . . of production in France and often worldwide.

In the 1820s Chaptal's son experienced financial ruin due to business speculations. To cover his son's debts, Chaptal sold Chanteloup and his home in Paris. During his last years he resided in an apartment in Paris at No.8 rue Grenelle. In this decade, Chaptal wrote his 1823 study of the application of scientific principles to the cultivation of land, the Chemistry applied to agriculture.

=== Death ===
He lived long enough to witness the Revolution of 1830 that brought Louis Philippe I to the throne. He was 76 years old when he died in 1832. Chaptal was buried at the Père Lachaise cemetery in Paris. His name is one of the 72 names of famous French scientists engraved on the Eiffel Tower in Paris. Place Chaptal in Mende, Lozère is named after Chaptal and features a statue dedicated to his memory. The Lycée Chaptal in Paris' 8th arrondissement is named in honour of Chaptal.

== Selected publications ==
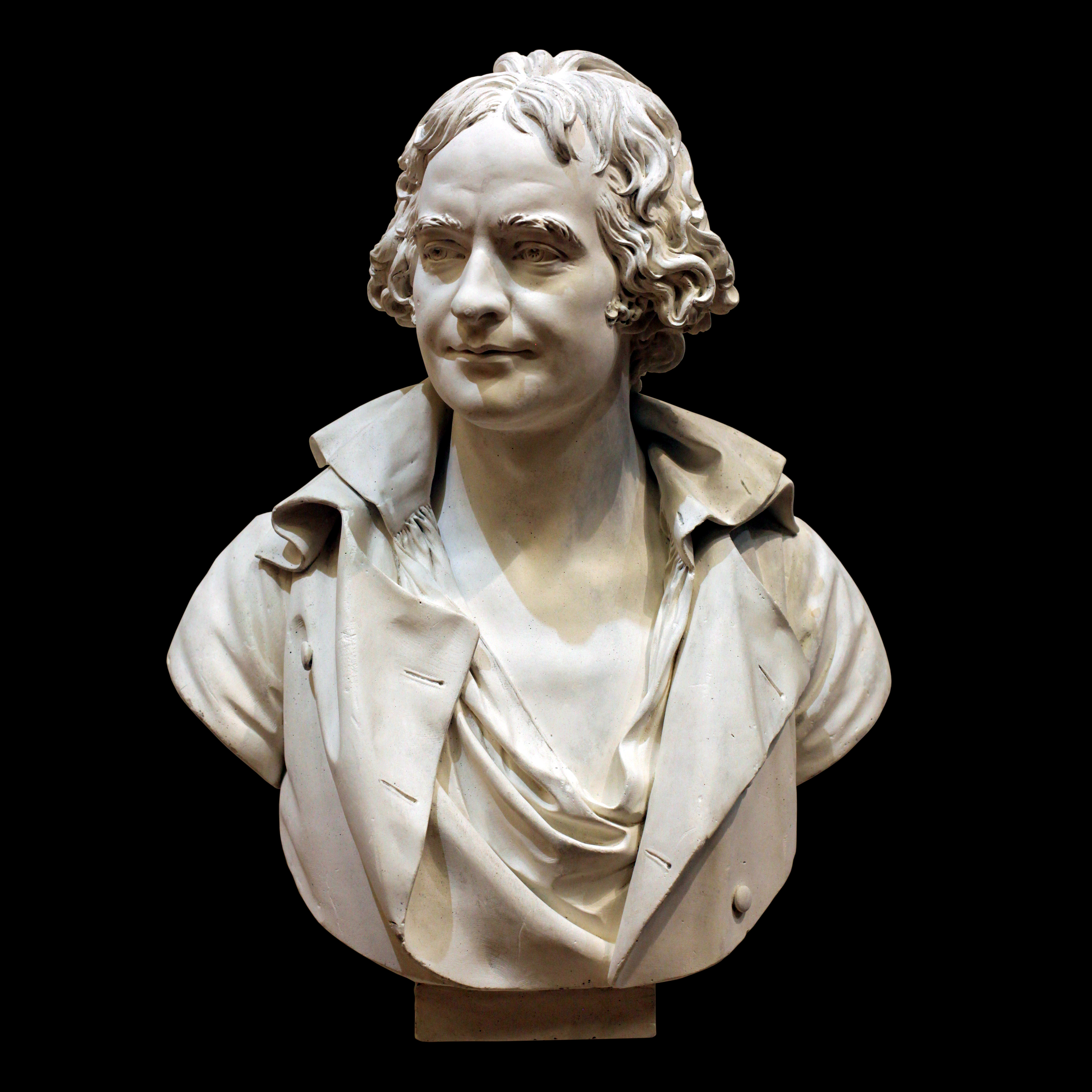
Bust of Chaptal, by Philippe-Laurent Roland.

- Mémoires de chimie (Montpellier, 1781).
- "Observations sur l'acide muriatique oxigéné," Mémoires de l'Académie Royales des Sciences (Paris, 1784).
- "Sur les moyens de fabriquer de la bonne poterie à Montpellier," Annales de chimie, 2 (1789).
- Éléments de chimie (3 vols, Montpellier, 1790).
- "Instructions sur un nouveau procédé pour la raffinage du salpétre," Journal de physique, 45 (1794).
- Traité du salpétre et des goudrons (1796).
- Tableau des principaux sels terreux (1798).
- "Observations chimiques sur la couleur jaune qu'on extrait des végétaux," Mémoires de l'Institut, 2 (1798).
- "Sur les vins," Annual de chimie, 35 (1800).
- "Essai sur le perfectionnement des arts chimiques en France," Journal de Physique, 50 (1800).
- Essai sur le blanchiment (1801).
- L'Art de faire, gouverner et de perfectionner le vin (Paris, 1801).
- Traité théorique et pratique sur la culture de la vigne, avec l'art de faire le vin, les eaux-de-vie, esprit de vin, vinaigres simples et composés (2 vols, Paris, 1801).
- "Vues générales sur l'action des terres sans la végétation," Mémoires de la Société d'Agriculture de la Seine, 4 (1802).
- La Chimie appliquée aux arts (4 vols, Paris, 1806).
- Art de la teinture du coton en rouge (Paris, 1807).
- Art des principes chimiques du teinturier dégraisseur (Paris, 1808).
- "Mémoire sur le sucre de betterave," Annales de chimie, 95 (1815).
- Chimie appliquée à l'agriculture (2 vols, Paris, 1823).

== See also ==
- Antoine Germain Labarraque (1777–1850). Student of Chaptal who established the routine use of solutions of chlorine as a disinfectant and deodouriser.

== Notes ==
Political offices
Preceded by Lucien Bonaparte	Minister of the Interior; 1800–1804	Succeeded by Jean-Baptiste Nompère de Champagny
