= Tonk meteorite =

Carbonaceous chondrite meteorite

Tonk
- Type: Chondrite
- Class: Carbonaceous chondrite
- Group: CI1
- Country: India
- Region: Rajasthan
- Coordinates: 24°39′N 76°52′E
- Observed fall: Yes
- Fall date: 22 January 1911
- TKW: 7.7 g (0.27 oz)
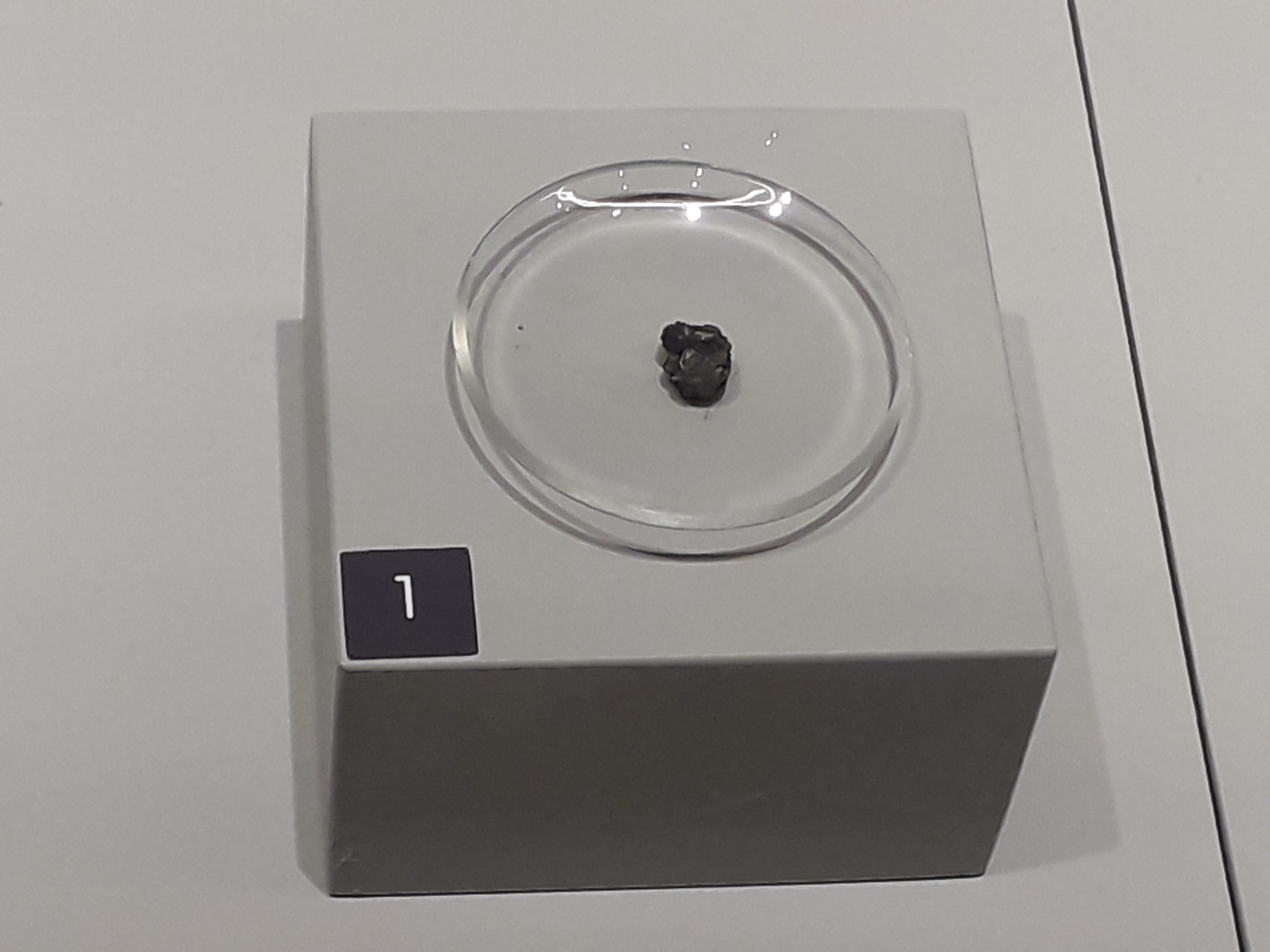
- The similar Alais meteorite in 2018

Tonk is a small carbonaceous chondrite meteorite that fell near Tonk, India in 1911. Despite its small size, it is often included in studies due to its compositional similarity to the early solar system.

== Composition and classification ==
The meteorite consists of fragments that together weigh 7.7 g (0.27 oz) and fell near the city of Tonk in India near midday on 22 January 1911. It is one of five known meteorites belonging to the CI chondrite group. This group is remarkable for having an elemental distribution that has the strongest similarity to that of the solar nebula. Except for certain volatile elements, like carbon, hydrogen, oxygen, nitrogen and the noble gases, which are not present in the meteorite, the ratios of the elements are very similar. Notably though, the meteor is highly enriched in volatile mercury which is undetectable in the solar photosphere, and this is a major driver of the "mercury paradox" that mercury abundances in meteors do not follow its volatile nature and isotopic ratios based expected behaviour in the solar nebula. These features mean that it is often, despite its small size, included in meteorological studies. The meteorite contains dolomite, magnesite, magnetite, pentlandite and pyrrhotite.

== Alternative names ==
The meteorite is also known as Chhabra and Jhalrapatan.

== See also ==
- Glossary of meteoritics
