= La Louptière-Thénard =

Commune in Grand Est, France

- Commune
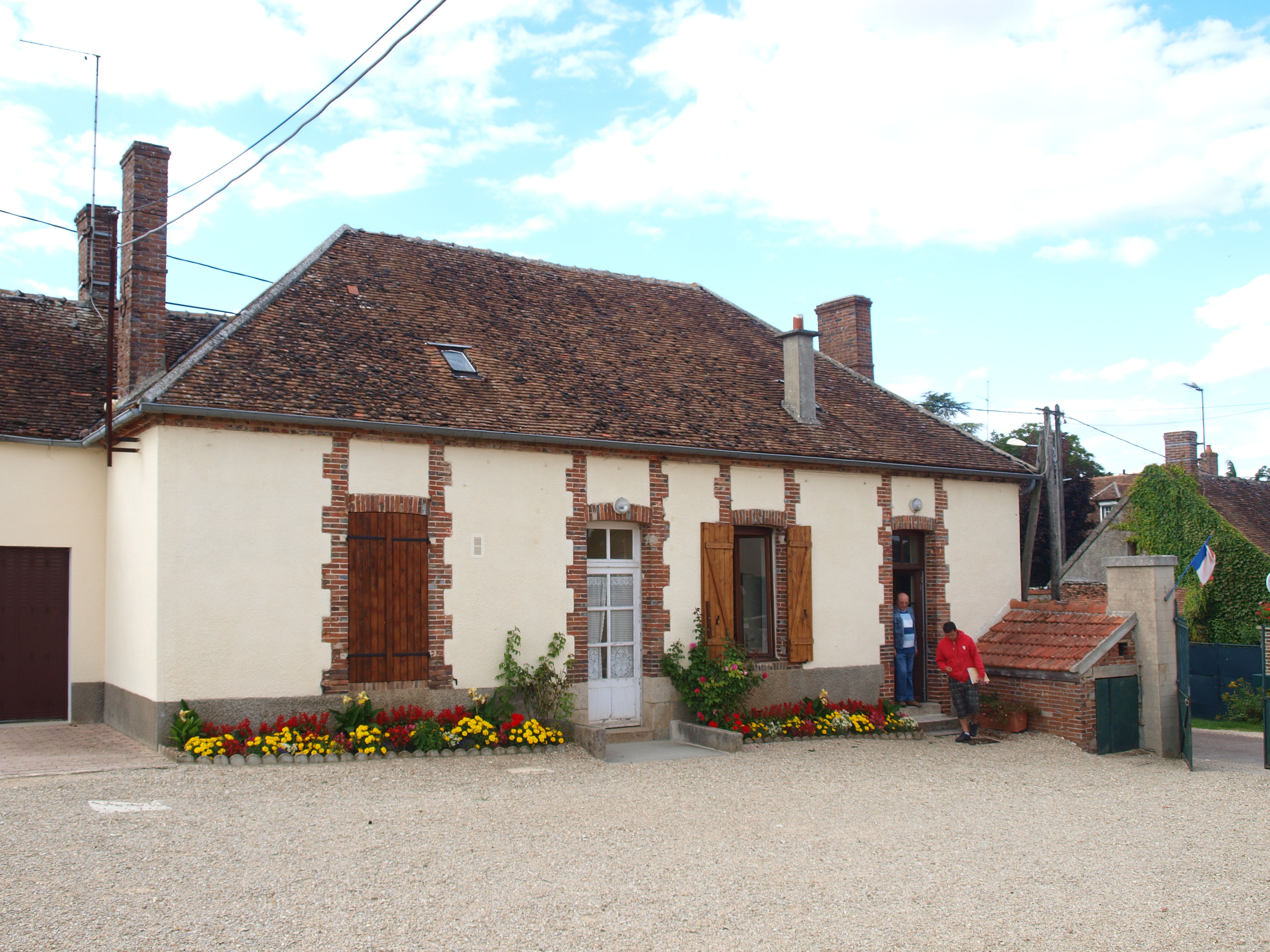
- The town hall in La Louptière-Thénard
- Location of La Louptière-Thénard
- Location within France Location within Grand Est
- Coordinates: 48°23′21″N 3°26′12″E
- Country: France
- Region: Grand Est
- Department: Aube
- Arrondissement: Nogent-sur-Seine
- Canton: Nogent-sur-Seine
- Intercommunality: Nogentais

Government
  - Mayor (2020–2026): Benoît Savourat
- Area^{1}: 13.68 km^{2} (5.28 sq mi)
- Elevation: 196 m (643 ft)
- Population (2023): 302
  - Density: 22.1/km^{2} (57.2/sq mi)
- Time zone: UTC+01:00 (CET)
  - Summer (DST): UTC+02:00 (CEST)
- INSEE/Postal code: 10208 /10400
- ^{1} French Land Register data, which excludes lakes, ponds, glaciers > 1 km^{2} (0.386 sq mi or 247 acres) and river estuaries.

La Louptière-Thénard (French pronunciation: [la luptjɛʁ tenaʁ]) is a commune in the Aube department in north-central France.

== Population ==
Historical population
Year	Pop.	±% p.a.
1968	205	—
1975	184	−1.53%
1982	161	−1.89%
1990	167	+0.46%
1999	216	+2.90%
2007	250	+1.84%
2012	294	+3.30%
2017	289	−0.34%
2023	302	+0.74%
Source: INSEE

== See also ==
- Communes of the Aube department
