= Orgueil (meteorite) =

Meteorite found in France

- Type: Chondrite
- Class: Carbonaceous chondrite
- Group: CI1
- Country: France
- Region: Midi-Pyrénées
- Coordinates: 43°53′N 1°23′E
- Observed fall: Yes
- Fall date: May 14, 1864
- TKW: 14 kg
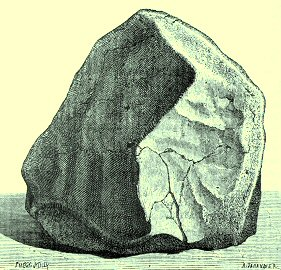
- Original painting of an individual fragment from the Orgueil meteorite
- Related media on Wikimedia Commons

Orgueil is a scientifically important carbonaceous chondrite meteorite that fell in southwestern France in 1864.

== History ==
The Orgueil meteorite fell on May 14, 1864, a few minutes after 20:00 local time, near Orgueil in southern France. About 20 stones fell over an area of 5-10 square kilometres. A specimen of the meteorite was analyzed that same year by François Stanislaus Clöez, professor of chemistry at the Musée d'Histoire Naturelle, who focused on the organic matter found in this meteorite. He wrote that it contained carbon, hydrogen, and oxygen, in ratios similar to peat from the Somme valley or to the lignite of Ringkohl near Kassel. An intense scientific discussion ensued, continuing into the 1870s, as to whether the organic matter might have a biological origin.

== Curation and Distribution ==
Orgueil specimens are in curation by bodies around the world. Given the large mass, samples are in circulation for nondestructive (and with sufficient justification, destructive) study and test.

Org	Mass	Place	Country	Ref
Mus. NdH	8.72 kg	Paris	France	
Narodni Muzeum	370g	Prague	Czech Republic	
Nat. Mus. of Scotland	348g	Edinburgh	UK	
Smithsonian	240g	Washington	USA	
Mus. fur Nat.	125.5g	Berlin	Germany	
Geol. Surv. Ind.	94g	Kolkata	India	
Vat. Met. Coll.	86g	Castel Gandolfo	Italy	
Ro. Akad. Nauk.	58.6g	Moscow	Russia	
Nat. Hist. Mus.	58g	Wien	Austria	
UCLA	46.4g	Los Angeles	USA	
Am. Mus. N.H.	46g	New York	USA	
Field Mus.	34g	Chicago	USA	
Royal Institution	25g	London	UK	
Max Planck Inst.	23g	Mainz	Germany	
DuPont Coll.	5.6g	Palatine	USA	
West. Aus. Mus.	5g	Perth	Australia	
Bartoschewitz Coll.	5g	Gifhorn	Germany	
IfP	2.1g	Munster	Germany	
U. NM Mus.	2g	Albuquerque	USA	
Geol. Surv. Ca.	1.2g	Ottawa	Canada	
Monnig Coll.	<1g	Fort Worth	USA	

Source: Grady, M. M. Catalogue of Meteorites, 5th Edition, Cambridge University Press

== Composition and classification ==
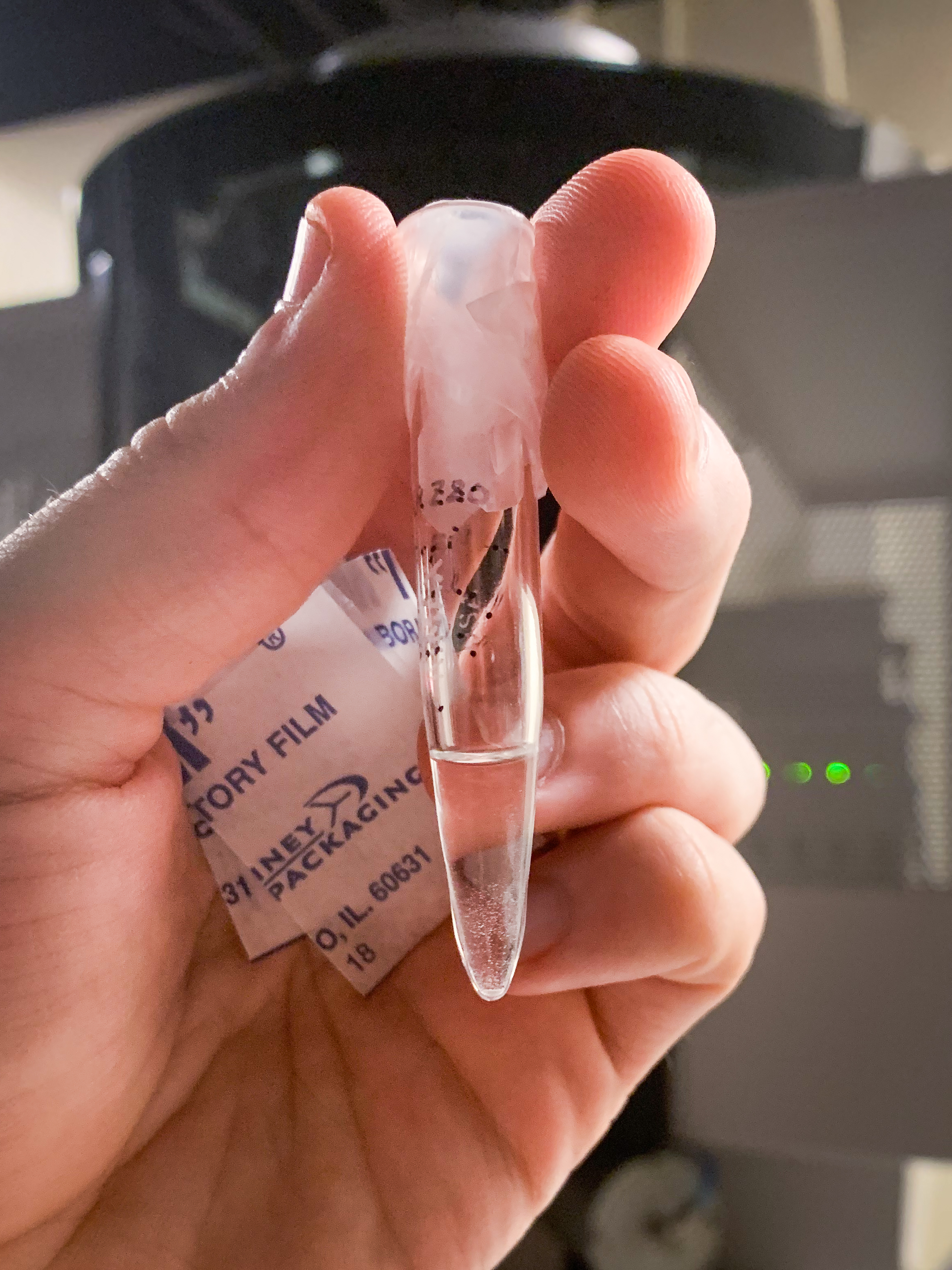
Vial of suspended presolar grains from the Orgueil meteorite.

Orgueil is one of five known meteorites belonging to the CI chondrite group (see meteorites classification), and is the largest (14 kilograms (31 lb)). This group has a composition that is essentially identical to that of the sun, excluding gaseous elements like hydrogen and helium. Notably though, the Orgueil meteor is highly enriched in (volatile) mercury - undetectable in the solar photosphere, and this is a major driver of the "mercury paradox" that mercury abundances in meteors do not follow its volatile nature and isotopic ratios based expected behaviour in the solar nebula.

Because of its extraordinarily primitive composition and relatively large mass, Orgueil is one of the most-studied meteorites. One notable discovery in Orgueil was a high concentration of isotopically anomalous xenon called "xenon-HL". The carrier of this gas is extremely fine-grained diamond dust that is older than the Solar System itself, known as presolar grains.

In 1962, Nagy et al. announced the discovery of 'organised elements' embedded in the Orgueil meteorite that were purportedly biological structures of extraterrestrial origin. These elements were subsequently shown to be either pollen (including that of ragwort) and fungal spores (Fitch & Anders, 1963) that had contaminated the sample, or crystals of the mineral olivine.

== Seed capsule hoax ==
In 1965, a fragment of the Orgueil meteorite, kept in a sealed glass jar in Montauban since its discovery, was found to have a seed capsule embedded in it, whilst the original glassy layer on the outside remained apparently undisturbed. Despite great initial excitement, the seed capsule was shown to be that of a European rush, glued into the fragment and camouflaged using coal dust. The outer "fusion layer" was in fact glue. Whilst the perpetrator is unknown, it is thought that the hoax was aimed at influencing 19th century debate on spontaneous generation by demonstrating the transformation of inorganic to biological matter.

== Claim of fossils ==
Richard B. Hoover of NASA has claimed that the Orgueil meteorite contains fossils, some of which are similar to known terrestrial species. Hoover has previously claimed the existence of fossils in the Murchison meteorite. NASA has formally distanced itself from Hoover's claims and his lack of expert peer-reviews.

== See also ==
- Glossary of meteoritics
