= Saint-Étienne-de-l'Olm =

- Commune
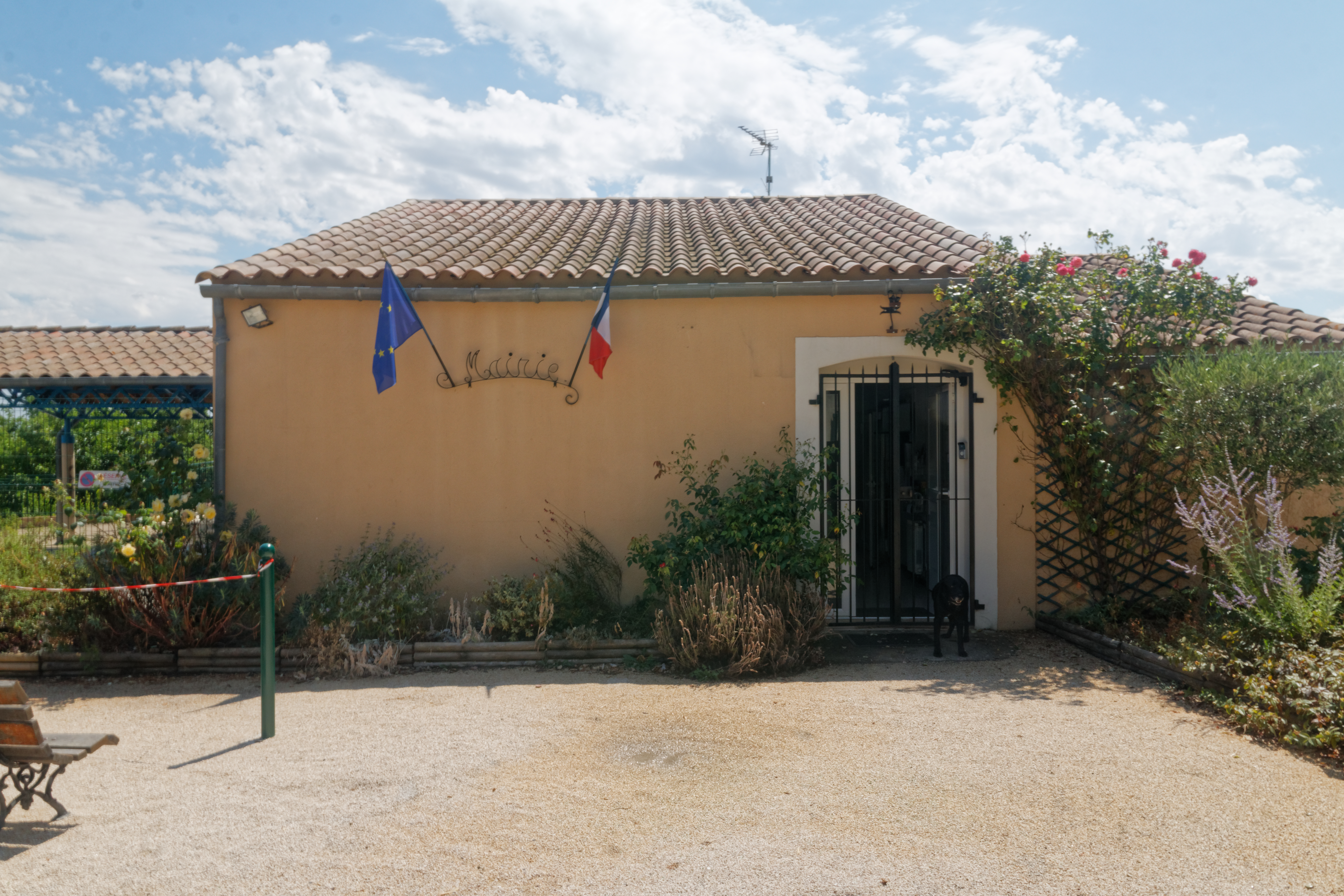
- Town hall

- Coat of arms
- Location of Saint-Étienne-de-l'Olm
- Location within France Location within Occitanie
- Coordinates: 44°03′34″N 4°11′06″E
- Country: France
- Region: Occitania
- Department: Gard
- Arrondissement: Alès
- Canton: Alès-3
- Intercommunality: Alès Agglomération

Government
  - Mayor (2020–2026): Johanna Huguet
- Area^{1}: 4.18 km^{2} (1.61 sq mi)
- Elevation: 120 m (390 ft)
- Highest elevation: 178 m (584 ft)
- Lowest elevation: 96 m (315 ft)
- Population (2023): 379
  - Density: 90.7/km^{2} (235/sq mi)
- Time zone: UTC+01:00 (CET)
  - Summer (DST): UTC+02:00 (CEST)
- INSEE/Postal code: 30250 /30360
- ^{1} French Land Register data, which excludes lakes, ponds, glaciers > 1 km^{2} (0.386 sq mi or 247 acres) and river estuaries.

Saint-Étienne-de-l'Olm (French pronunciation: [sɛ̃.t‿etjɛn də lɔlm]; Occitan: Sent Estève de l'Ome) is a commune in the Gard department in southern France.

== Population ==
Historical population
Year	Pop.	±% p.a.
1968	130	—
1975	97	−4.10%
1982	129	+4.16%
1990	194	+5.23%
1999	235	+2.15%
2007	324	+4.10%
2012	340	+0.97%
2017	388	+2.68%
2023	379	−0.39%
Source: INSEE

== See also ==
- Communes of the Gard department
