= Castelnau-Valence =

Commune in Occitanie, France

- Commune
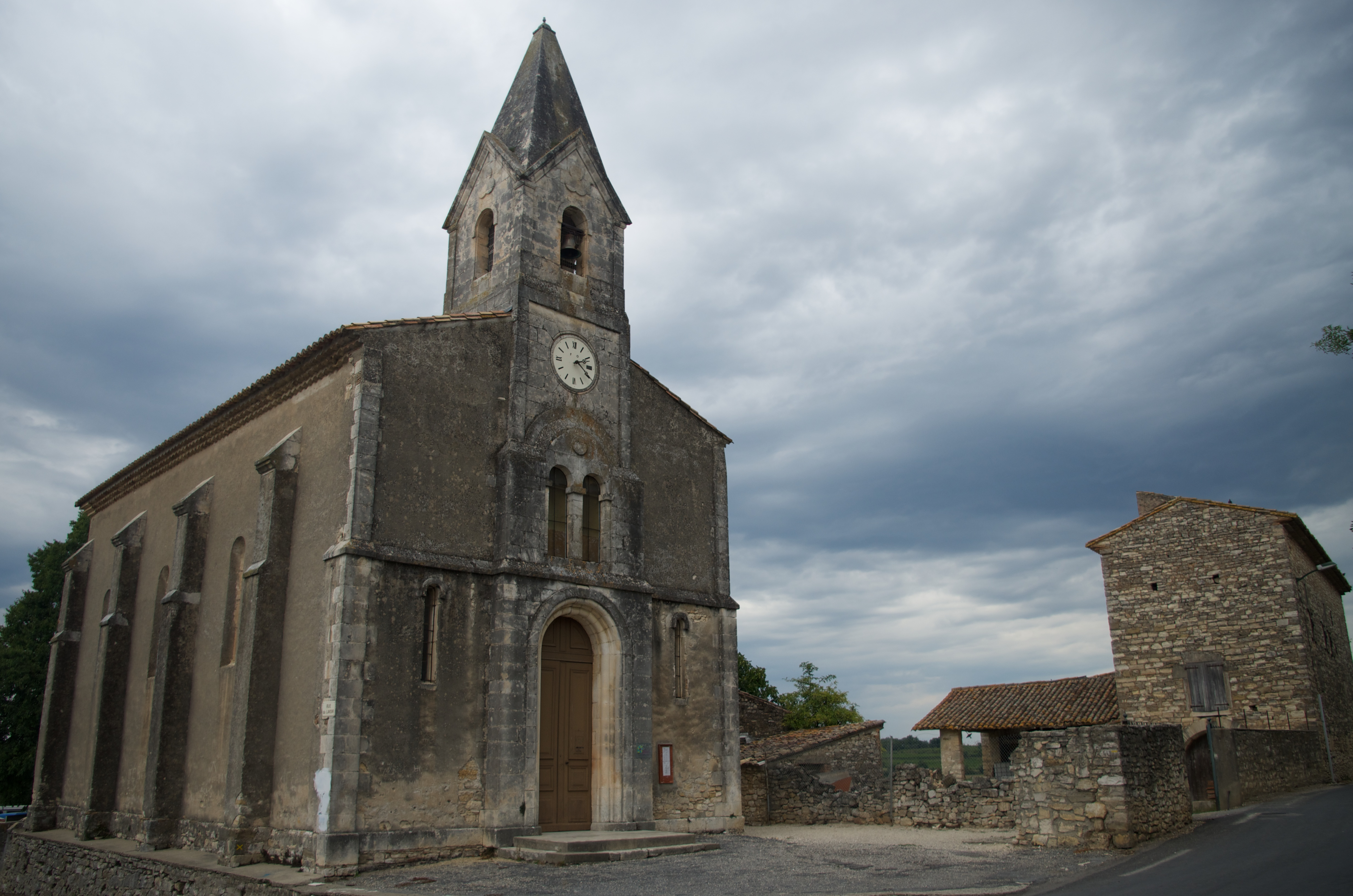
- The Protestant church of Castelnau-Valence

- Coat of arms
- Location of Castelnau-Valence
- Location within France Location within Occitanie
- Coordinates: 44°00′35″N 4°15′10″E
- Country: France
- Region: Occitania
- Department: Gard
- Arrondissement: Alès
- Canton: Alès-3
- Intercommunality: Alès Agglomération

Government
  - Mayor (2020–2026): Christophe Bougarel
- Area^{1}: 10.27 km^{2} (3.97 sq mi)
- Elevation: 150 m (490 ft)
- Highest elevation: 196 m (643 ft)
- Lowest elevation: 89 m (292 ft)
- Population (2023): 469
  - Density: 45.7/km^{2} (118/sq mi)
- Time zone: UTC+01:00 (CET)
  - Summer (DST): UTC+02:00 (CEST)
- INSEE/Postal code: 30072 /30190
- ^{1} French Land Register data, which excludes lakes, ponds, glaciers > 1 km^{2} (0.386 sq mi or 247 acres) and river estuaries.

Castelnau-Valence (French pronunciation: [kastɛlno valɑ̃s]; Occitan: Castèlnòu e Valença) is a commune in the Gard department in southern France.

== Population ==
Historical population
Year	Pop.	±% p.a.
1968	228	—
1975	203	−1.65%
1982	256	+3.37%
1990	267	+0.53%
1999	261	−0.25%
2007	327	+2.86%
2012	424	+5.33%
2017	454	+1.38%
2023	469	+0.54%
Source: INSEE

== See also ==
- Communes of the Gard department
