= Murchison meteorite =

Meteorite found in Victoria, Australia

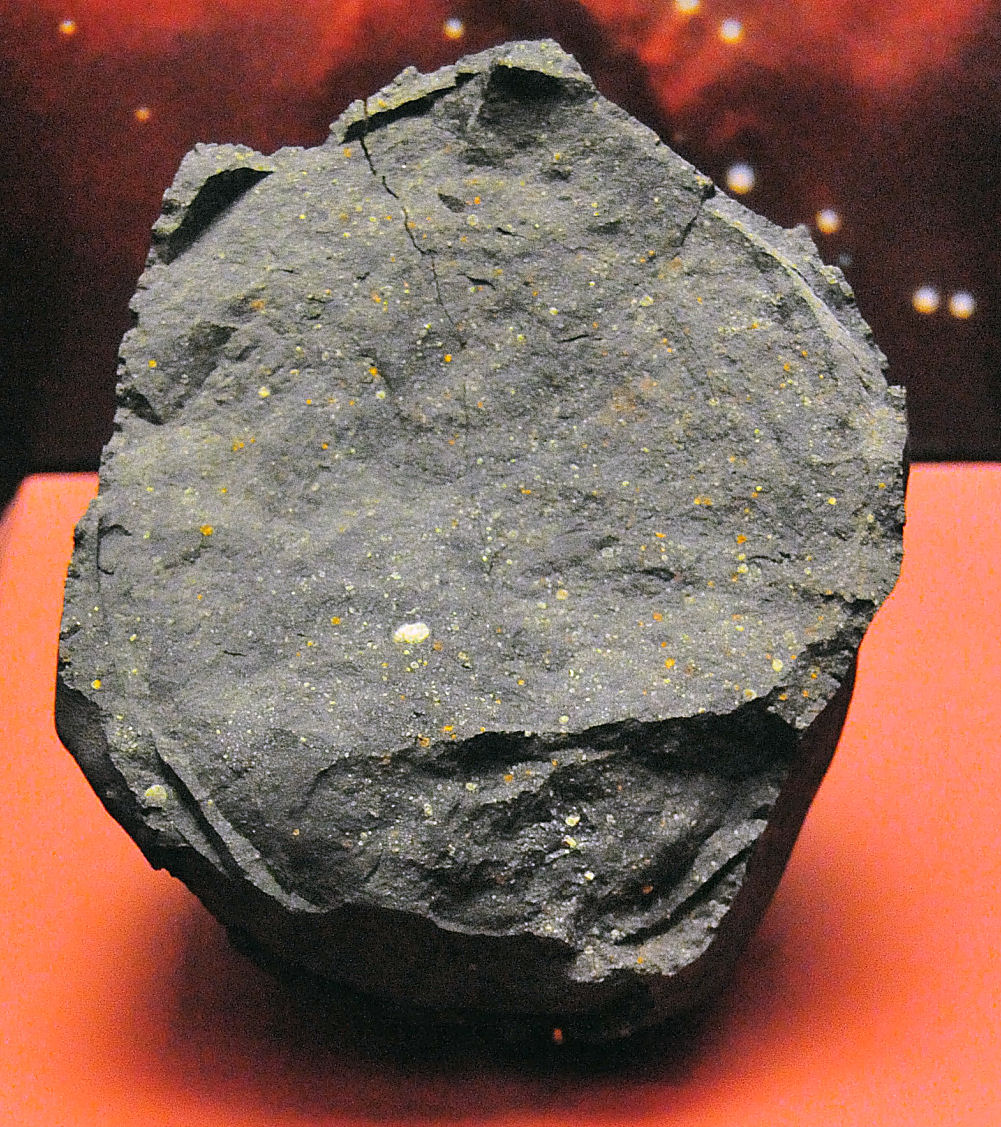
- A Murchison meteorite specimen at the National Museum of Natural History, Washington, D.C.
- Type: Chondrite
- Class: Carbonaceous chondrite
- Group: CM2
- Composition: 22.13% total iron, 12% water
- Shock stage: S1–2
- Country: Australia
- Region: Victoria
- Coordinates: 36°37′S 145°12′E
- Observed fall: Yes
- Fall date: 28 September 1969
- TKW: 100 kg (220 lb)
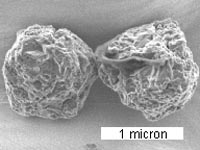
- Pair of grains from the Murchison meteorite
- Related media on Wikimedia Commons

The Murchison meteorite is a meteorite that fell in Australia in 1969 near Murchison, Victoria. It belongs to the carbonaceous chondrite class, a group of meteorites rich in organic compounds. Due to its mass (over 100 kg or 220 lb) and the fact that it was an observed fall, the Murchison meteorite is one of the most studied of all meteorites.

In January 2020, cosmochemists reported that the oldest material found on Earth to date are the silicon carbide particles from the Murchison meteorite, which have been determined to be 7 billion years old, about 2.5 billion years older than the 4.54-billion-year age of the Earth and the Solar System. (Note: That makes the stardust grains in the Murchison meteorite presolar grains, since they originated at a time before the Sun was formed.) The published study noted that "dust lifetime estimates mainly rely on sophisticated theoretical models. These models, however, focus on the more common small dust grains and are based on assumptions with large uncertainties."

== History ==
On 28 September 1969 at approximately 10:58 a.m. local time, near Murchison, Victoria, in Australia, a bright fireball was observed to separate into three fragments before disappearing, leaving a cloud of smoke. About 30 seconds later, a tremor was heard. Many fragments were found scattered over an area larger than 13 km^{2} (5.0 mi^{2}; 3,200 acres), with individual mass up to 7 kilograms (15.4 lb); one, weighing 680 grams (1.5 lb), broke through a roof and fell in hay. The total collected mass of the meteorite exceeds 100 kilograms (220 lb).

== Classification and composition ==
The meteorite belongs to the CM group of carbonaceous chondrites. Like most CM chondrites, Murchison is petrologic type 2, which means that it experienced extensive alteration by water-rich fluids on its parent body before falling to Earth. CM chondrites, together with the CI group, are rich in carbon and are among the most chemically primitive meteorites. Like other CM chondrites, Murchison contains abundant calcium-aluminium-rich inclusions. More than 15 amino acids, some of the basic components of life, have been identified during multiple studies of this meteorite.

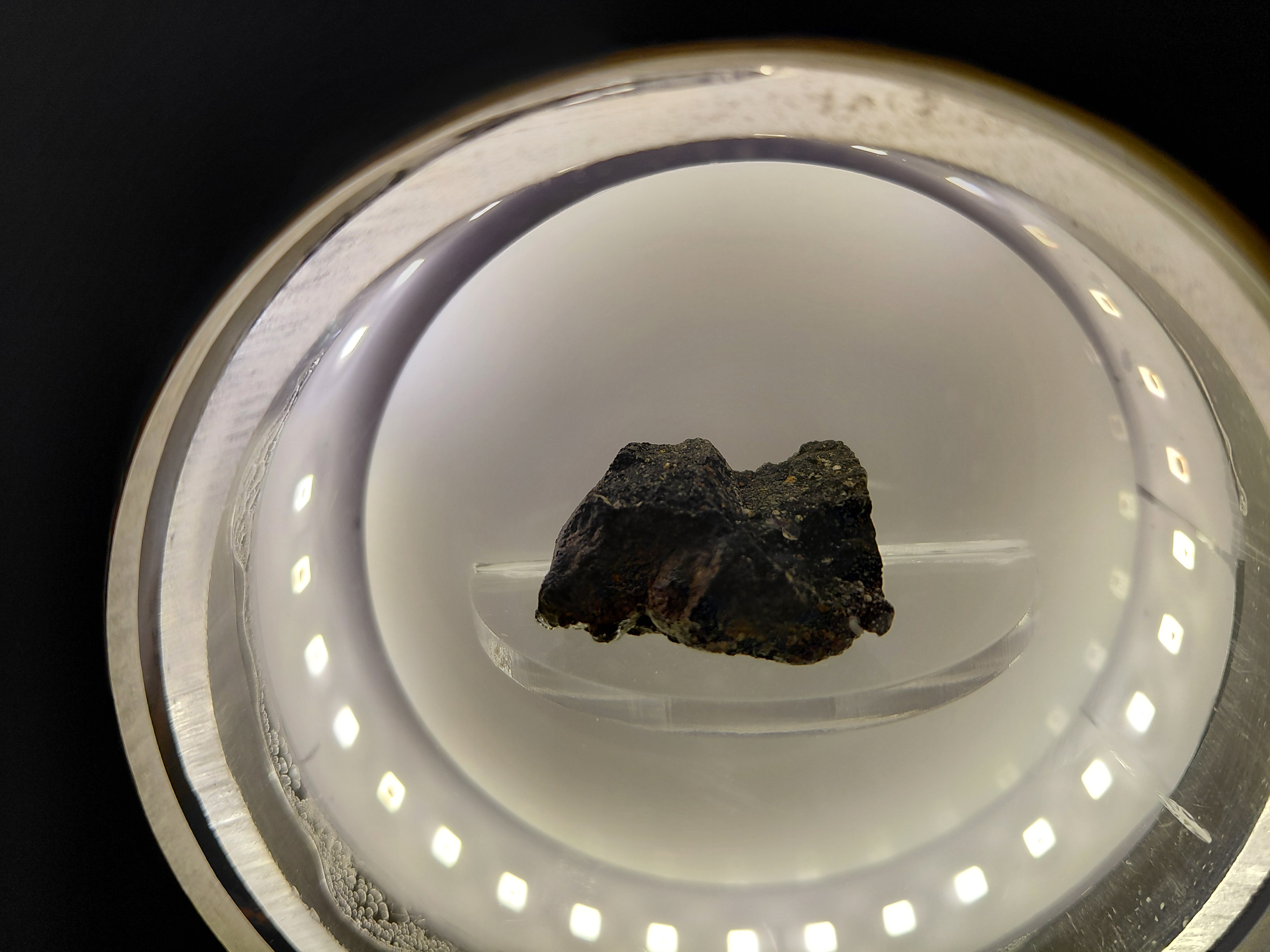
A piece of the Murchison meteorite in Museo Nacional de Costa Rica.

In January 2020, astronomers reported that silicon carbide grains from the Murchison meteorite had been determined to be presolar material. The oldest of these grains was found to be 3 ± 2 billion years older than the 4.54 billion years age of the Earth and Solar System, making it the oldest material found on Earth to date.

== Organic compounds ==
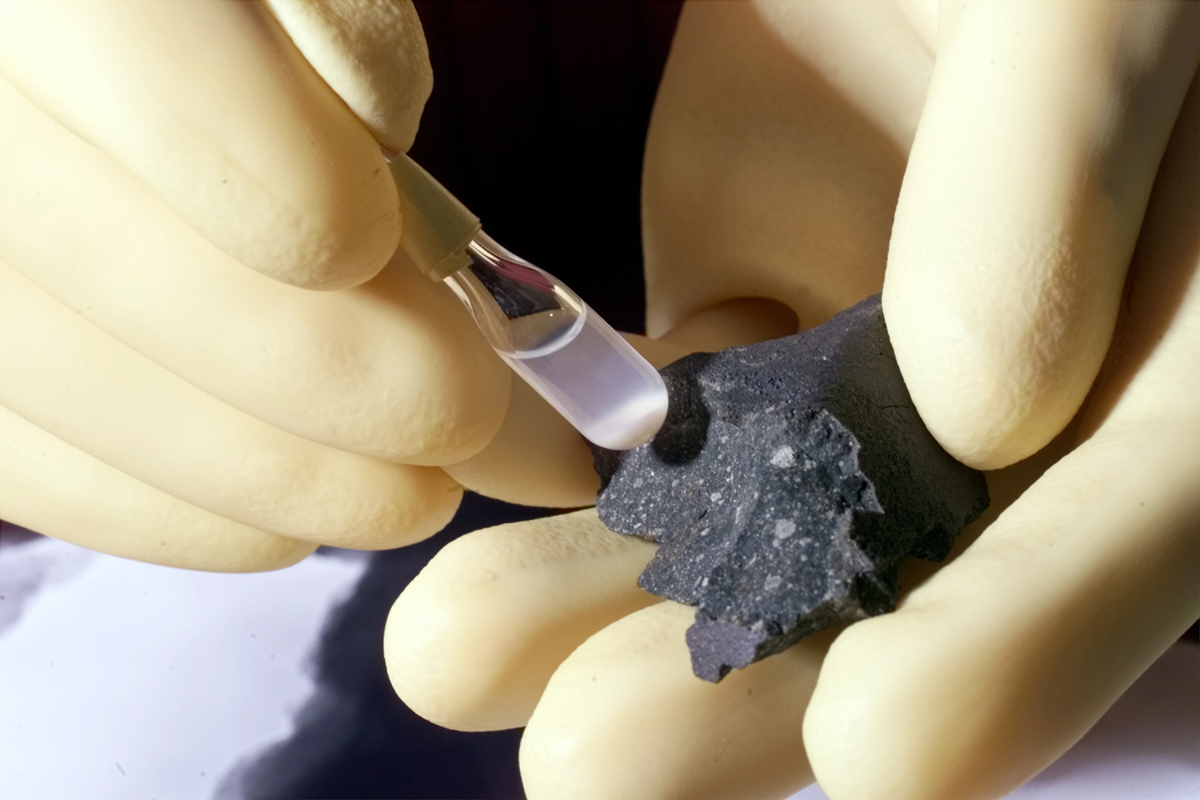
Fragment of the Murchison meteorite (at right) and isolated individual particles (shown in the test tube)

Murchison contains common amino acids such as glycine, alanine, and glutamic acid as well as unusual ones such as isovaline and pseudoleucine. A complex mixture of alkanes was isolated as well, similar to that found in the Miller–Urey experiment. Serine and threonine, usually considered to be earthly contaminants, were conspicuously absent in the samples. A specific family of amino acids called diamino acids was identified in the Murchison meteorite as well.

The initial report in 1970 stated that the amino acids were racemic and therefore formed in an abiotic manner, because amino acids of terrestrial proteins are all of the L-configuration of chirality. Later, in 1982, it was reported that the amino acid alanine had an excess of the L-configuration, but this is a protein amino acid which led several scientists to suspect terrestrial contamination according to the argument that it would be "unusual for an abiotic stereoselective decomposition or synthesis of amino acids to occur with protein amino acids but not with non-protein amino acids". But in 1997, L-excesses were also reported for several non-protein amino acids, suggesting an extraterrestrial source for molecular asymmetry in the Solar System. Some amino acids were found to be racemic (equal quantities of right-handed and left-handed). Around the same time, an enrichment in the isotope ^{15}N was reported, however this result and the non-racemicity of alanine (but not of the others) were explained as possibly due to analysis error.

By 2001, the list of organic materials identified in the meteorite was extended to polyols.

Compound class	Concentration (ppm)
Amino acids	17–60
Aliphatic hydrocarbons	>35
Aromatic hydrocarbons	3319
Fullerenes	>100
Carboxylic acids	>300
Hydrocarboxylic acids	15
Purines and pyrimidines	1.3
Alcohols	11
Sulfonic acids	68
Phosphonic acids	2
Total	>3911.3

The meteorite contained a mixture of left-handed and right-handed amino acids; most amino acids used by living organisms are left-handed in chirality, and most sugars used are right-handed. A team of chemists in Sweden demonstrated in 2005 that this homochirality could have been triggered or catalyzed by the action of a left-handed amino acid such as proline.

Several lines of evidence indicate that the interior portions of well-preserved fragments from Murchison are pristine. A 2010 study using high resolution analytical tools including spectroscopy, identified 14,000 molecular compounds, including 70 amino acids, in a sample of the meteorite. The limited scope of the analysis by mass spectrometry provides for a potential 50,000 or more unique molecular compositions, with the team estimating the possibility of millions of distinct organic compounds in the meteorite.

In November 2019, along with the Northwest Africa 801 meteorite it was the first to provide evidence of pentoses (including ribose) in space, using gas chromatography–mass spectrometry. All the straight-chain five-carbon aldoses were found but tetroses, sugar alcohols, sugar acids, and deoxyribose were not detected.

In 2020, NASA announced that hexamethylenetetramine had been found in the Murchison, Murray and Tagish Lake meteorites.

=== Nucleobases ===
Measured purine and pyrimidine compounds were found in the Murchison meteorite. Carbon isotope ratios for uracil and xanthine of δ^{13}C = +44.5‰ and +37.7‰, respectively, indicate a non-terrestrial origin for these compounds. This specimen demonstrates that many organic compounds could have been delivered by early Solar System bodies and may have played a key role in life's origin.

== See also ==
- Cosmochemistry
- Glossary of meteoritics
- Panspermia
- Pseudo-panspermia
