= Impact survival =

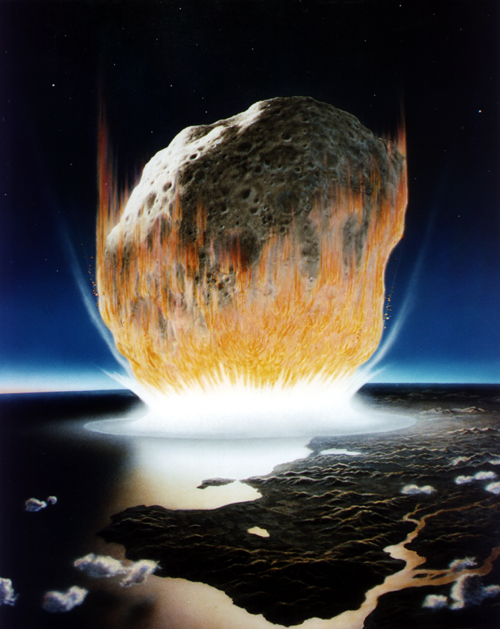
An artist's depiction of a major collision event.

Impact survival is a theory that life, usually in the form of microbial bacteria, can survive under the extreme conditions of a major impact event, such as a meteorite striking the surface of a planet. This step is necessary for the possibility of panspermia. Microbial life must be able to survive both the escape out of a planetary atmosphere - likely due to a major impact - as well as the re-entry through the atmosphere, of and collision with, a second planetary body.

== Dangers to life ==
For small organisms to leave a planet's orbit, escape velocity must be reached, the magnitude of which depends upon the mass of the planet. To reach these velocities, both the surviving organisms and the pieces of debris that they live on must withstand large amounts of acceleration and jerk. One calculation has determined that for possible organisms to be launched out of an orbit of a planet the size of Mars, jerk would be nearly 6 billion m/s^{3}. In addition to this, the velocity of incoming meteorites are projected to be in the range of 20 to 25 km/s. Thus, any organisms that could survive a major impact event and be sent to outer space must be very small, light, and able to withstand large amounts of acceleration and jerk. While concerns over the heat of ejected rocks and the possible sterilizing effects it would have on the microbial life attached, it has been theorized that for rocks even less than 2 kilograms such as ALH84001, internal parts may never reach temperatures greater than 40 °C.

== Possible organisms on Earth ==
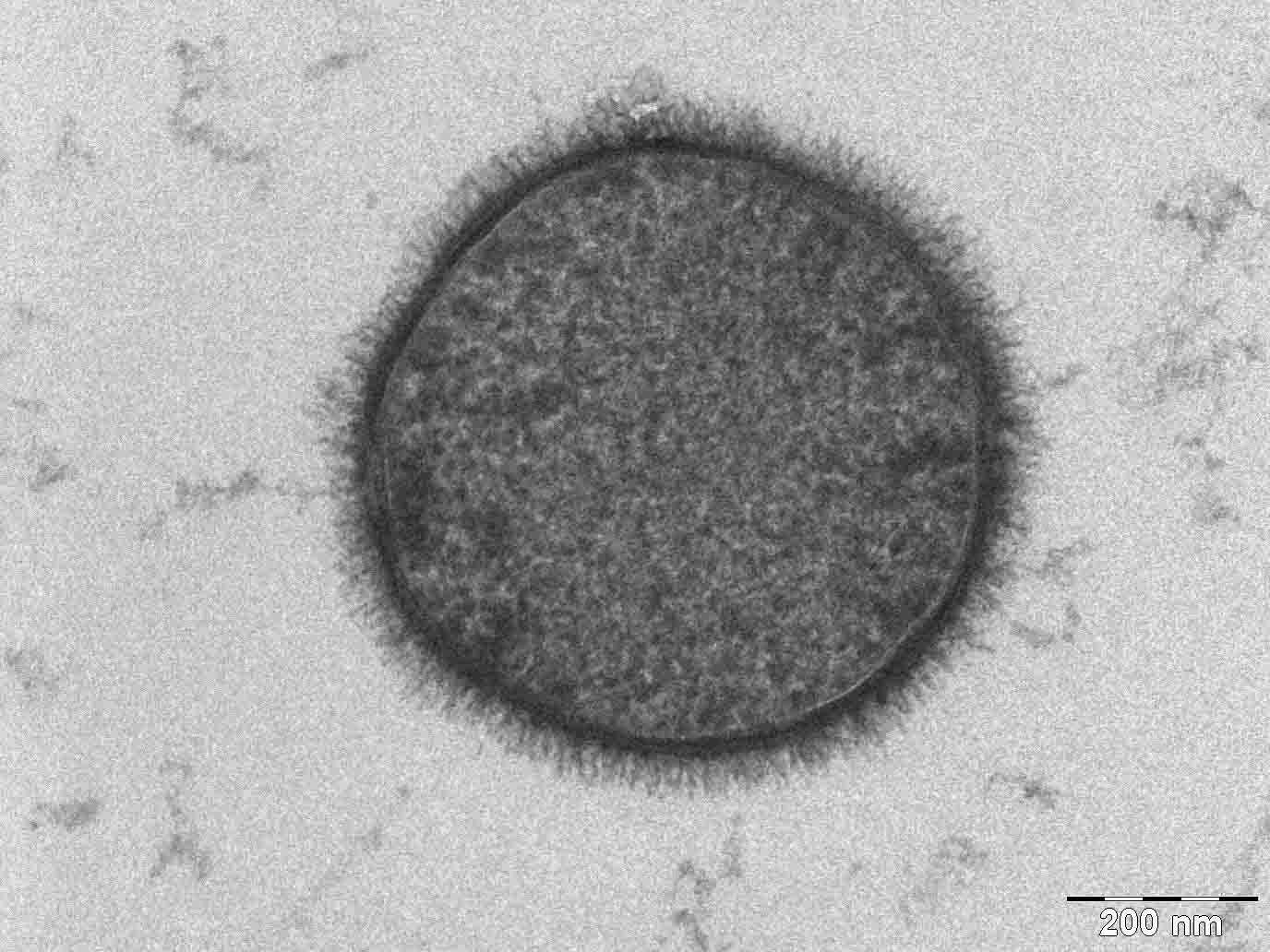
The bacteria B. subtilis.

Recent experiments have found organisms that can survive both the acceleration and jerk involved in reaching escape velocity. A major impact event was simulated using an air cannon to propel both ice and agar projectiles covered with chosen microorganisms to extreme speeds and then crashing the projectiles into a solid surface. Two species of bacteria were tested - R. erythropolis and B. subtilis - and while survival rates were low, at 100 GPa of peak pressure there was still a survival rate of 3.9 × 10^{−5} in the B. subtilis. These findings have been replicated with other bacteria as well - D. radiodurans as well as when shot into liquid water - with similar low, but not zero, survival rates. Also, experimental methods have been varied, and survival rates have also been found when bacteria are subjected to acceleration at an extended time, through the use of a centrifuge as well as when shot into liquid water. While very small, these non-zero results show that some lifeforms could survive the impact from a major impact event.

== See also ==
- Asteroid impact
- Panspermia
- Astrobiology
- List of microorganisms tested in outer space
