= 773 Irmintraud =

Main-belt rare-type asteroid

Discovery
- Discovered by: F. Kaiser
- Discovery site: Heidelberg Obs.
- Discovery date: 22 December 1913

Designations
- Pronunciation: German: [ˈɪʁmɪntʁaʊt]
- Named after: Irmtraud (German given-name)
- Alternative designations: 1913 TV · 1946 SO; A910 CG
- Minor planet category: main-belt · (outer)

Orbital characteristics
- Epoch 31 July 2016 (JD 2457600.5)
- Uncertainty parameter 0
- Observation arc: 102.32 yr (37372 d)
- Aphelion: 3.0876 AU (461.90 Gm)
- Perihelion: 2.6294 AU (393.35 Gm)
- Semi-major axis: 2.8585 AU (427.63 Gm)
- Eccentricity: 0.080135
- Orbital period (sidereal): 4.83 yr (1765.2 d)
- Mean anomaly: 220.21°
- Mean motion: 0° 12^{m} 14.184^{s} / day
- Inclination: 16.684°
- Longitude of ascending node: 322.41°
- Argument of perihelion: 331.91°
- Earth MOID: 1.62349 AU (242.871 Gm)
- Jupiter MOID: 2.21251 AU (330.987 Gm)
- T_{Jupiter}: 3.236

Physical characteristics
- Dimensions: 95.88 km 87.07±1.76 km 91.67±0.90 km
- Mean radius: 47.94±0.9 km
- Mass: (5.2±2.5)×10^{17} kg (Note: Calculated from its standard gravitational parameter GM = 0.035±0.017 km^{3}/s^{2}.)
- Mean density: 1.31 g/cm^{3} (Note: Assuming a diameter of 91.7 km.)
- Synodic rotation period: 6.7514 h (0.28131 d); 6.750±0.002 h 6.75 h 6.746±0.004 h 6.748±0.001 h
- Geometric albedo: 0.0440; 0.053±0.003; 0.048±0.006; 0.0440±0.002
- Spectral type: B–V = 0.706; U–B = 0.284; D (Tholen), T (SMASS); T
- Absolute magnitude (H): 9.10

773 Irmintraud, provisional designation 1913 TV, is a dark and reddish, rare-type asteroid from the outer region of the asteroid belt, about 92 kilometers in diameter. It was discovered on 22 December 1913, by German astronomer Franz Kaiser at Heidelberg Observatory in southern Germany.

The asteroid is classified as a D-type and T-type body in the Tholen and SMASS taxonomy, respectively. The rare spectral T-type is similar to D-types which are often found among Jupiter trojans thought to have originated from the Kuiper belt. It orbits the Sun at a distance of 2.6–3.1 AU once every 4 years and 10 months (1,763 days). Its orbit is tilted by 17 degrees to the plane of the ecliptic and shows a low eccentricity of 0.08. According to the surveys carried out by the Infrared Astronomical Satellite, IRAS, the Japanese Akari satellite, and the Wide-field Infrared Survey Explorer with its subsequent NEOWISE mission, the minor planet's low albedo lies in the range of 0.04–0.05. It has a well-defined rotation period of 6.75 hours, determined by several concurring observations.

773 Irmintraud commemorates the antiquated German feminine name, Irmtraud, that appears frequently in old songs and sagas. The asteroid is a likely source of the Tagish Lake meteorite which landed in Canada on January 18, 2000.

== History ==
In 1992, Larry Lebofsky and colleagues published an article in which they noted that "unaltered asteroids are thought to represent the raw materials available for terrestrial planet formation and so are important to our understanding of the origin and evolution of the Solar System." Since at least 1980, it was believed that D-type asteroids were unaltered asteroids, ultraprimitive in composition and composed largely of hydrated silicates and organic material. However, in analyzing the spectra of 773 Irmintraud for the water of hydration band (the 3-μm absorption feature of hydrated silicates), Lebofsky discovered the first D-type asteroid to show the water of hydration band on the surface of the asteroid. Lebofsky concluded that 773 Irmintraud had undergone an alteration process typically seen in a C-type asteroid, making 773 Irmintraud and perhaps other D-type asteroids less likely to represent the raw materials available for terrestrial planet formation. In addition, the discovery of water of hydration band on 773 Irmintraud meant that there may be major differences in mineralogy within individual type classification and astronomers must be careful in assuming that the C-, D-, and other type classification relate directly to mineralogy.

In 1997, NASA added 773 Irmintraud and eventually over one million other names to a microchip placed on board the Stardust spacecraft that launched February 7, 1999. Placing the names onto the Stardust spacecraft was a public outreach effort. In particular, this served to promote public interest, awareness and support of the space program.

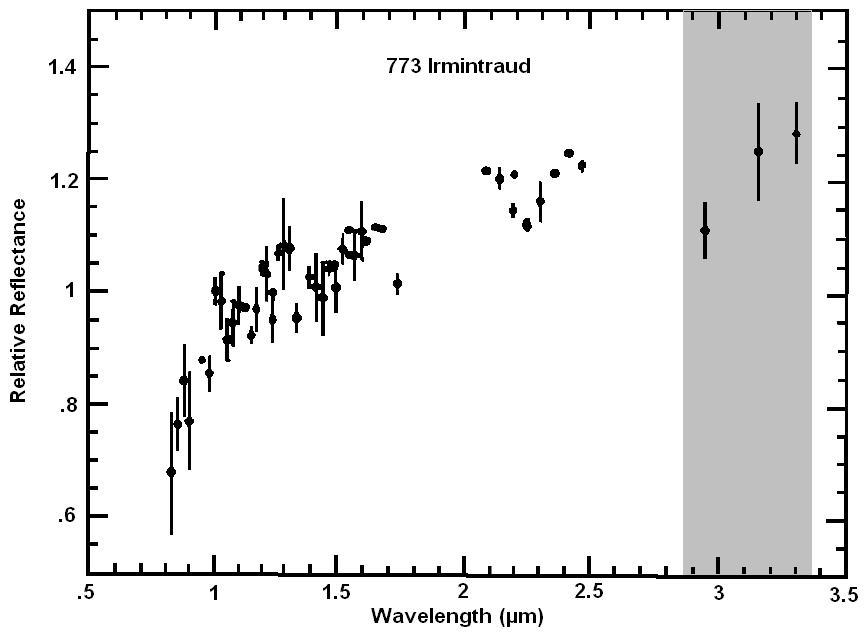
Preliminary spectrum graph of asteroid 773 Irmintraud, a main belt D-type asteroid that appears to show the presence of a 3-μm wavelength water of hydration band.

In September 2001, there was speculation that Tagish Lake meteorite which struck in British Columbia, Canada on January 18, 2000, was derived from a D-type asteroid, since the spectral shape and brightness of the meteorite was similar to D-type asteroids. Of the three studied, the 0.032 IRAS albedos (8) of 368 Haidea and the 0.033 IRAS albedos (8) of 773 Irmintraud are both considered close to the reflectance of the Tagish Lake meteorite. Moreover, even though 368 Haidea was closest spectrally to the Tagish Lake meteorite, 773 Irmintraud was no more than 0.034 AU to a chaotic zone associated with one of the Kirkwood gaps due to the mean motion resonance with Jupiter. This made 773 Irmintraud the closest of the three candidates to the associated chaotic zone and thus the most likely of the three as the source of the 2000 Earth impacted meteorite.

The idea that humans held a piece of the asteroid 773 Irmintraud spurred others to act. In 2002, the University of Tokyo performed near-infrared photometric and spectroscopic observations of 773. In addition, the University obtained an accurate lightcurve in Japan through visible photometry and ultimately found a gap between K- and L-band spectra. From this, the university concluded that results support the idea that Tagish Lake meteorite has a link with D-type asteroids.

On May 22, 2007, at 06:07 UT, Irmintraud occulted TYC 4908-00263-1, a 10.7 magnitude star in the constellation Sextans, for observers along a path across New Zealand.
