= Hexamethylenetetramine =

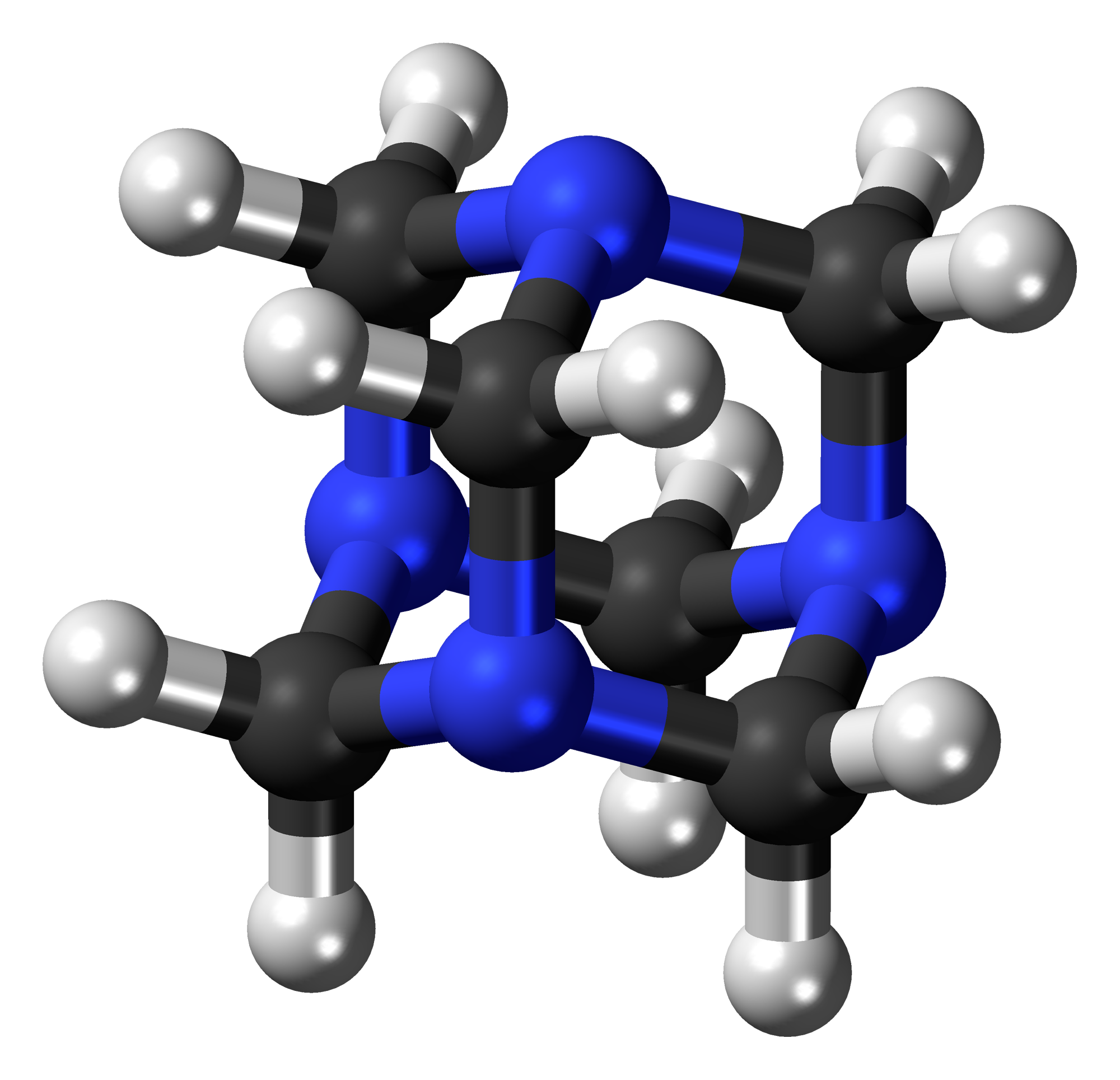

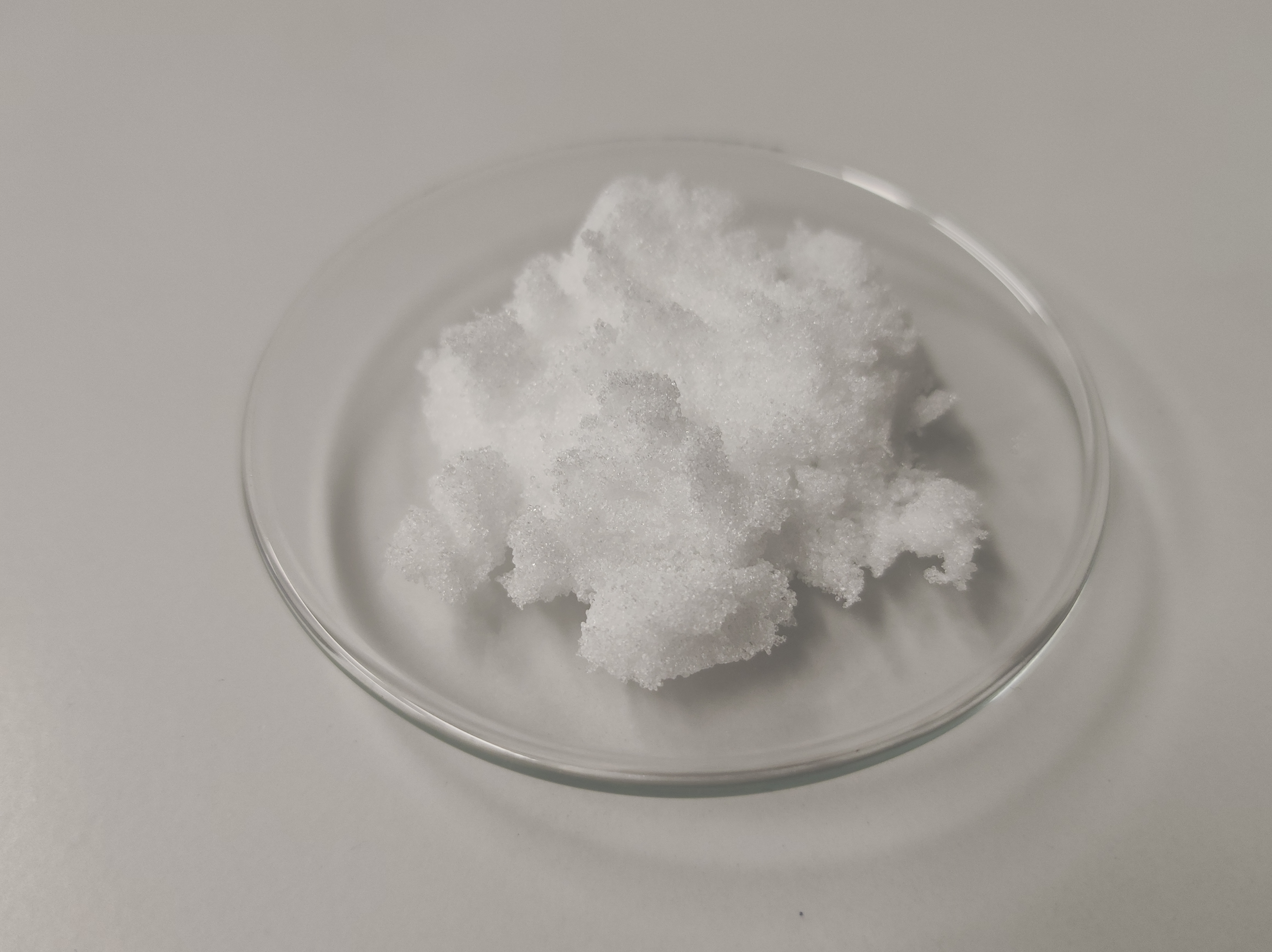

Names
- Preferred IUPAC name 1,3,5,7-Tetraazaadamantane
- Other names: Hexamine; Methenamine; Urotropine; Formin; Aminoform; HMTA

Identifiers
CAS Number	100-97-0
3D model (JSmol)	Interactive image
Beilstein Reference	2018
ChEBI	CHEBI:6824
ChEMBL	ChEMBL1201270
ChemSpider	3959
DrugBank	DB06799
ECHA InfoCard	100.002.642
EC Number	202-905-8
E number	E239 (preservatives)
Gmelin Reference	26964
KEGG	D00393
MeSH	Methenamine
PubChem CID	4101
RTECS number	MN4725000
UNII	J50OIX95QV
UN number	1328
CompTox Dashboard (EPA)	DTXSID6020692
- InChI: InChI=1S/C6H12N4/c1-7-2-9-4-8(1)5-10(3-7)6-9/h1-6H2 Key: VKYKSIONXSXAKP-UHFFFAOYSA-N; InChI=1/C6H12N4/c1-7-2-9-4-8(1)5-10(3-7)6-9/h1-6H2 Key: VKYKSIONXSXAKP-UHFFFAOYAW
- SMILES: C1N2CN3CN1CN(C2)C3

Properties
Chemical formula	C_{6}H_{12}N_{4}
Molar mass	140.190 g·mol^{−1}
Appearance	White crystalline solid
Odor	Fishy, ammonia like
Density	1.33 g/cm^{3} (at 20 °C)
Melting point	280 °C (536 °F; 553 K) (sublimes)
Solubility in water	85.3 g/100 mL
Solubility	Soluble in chloroform, methanol, ethanol, acetone, benzene, xylene, ether
Solubility in chloroform	13.4 g/100 g (20 °C)
Solubility in methanol	7.25 g/100 g (20 °C)
Solubility in ethanol	2.89 g/100 g (20 °C)
Solubility in acetone	0.65 g/100 g (20 °C)
Solubility in benzene	0.23 g/100 g (20 °C)
Acidity (pK_{a})	4.89 (conjugate acid)

Pharmacology
ATC code	J01XX05 (WHO)

Hazards
- Occupational safety and health (OHS/OSH)
Main hazards	Highly combustible, harmful
- GHS labelling
Pictograms	(GHS02: Flammable) (GHS07: Exclamation mark)
Signal word	Warning
Hazard statements	H228, H317
Precautionary statements	P210, P240, P241, P261, P272, P280, P302+P352, P321, P333+P313, P363, P370+P378, P501
NFPA 704 (fire diamond)	2 3 1
Flash point	250 °C (482 °F; 523 K)
Autoignition temperature	410 °C (770 °F; 683 K)

Related compounds
Related compounds	Adamantane; 1,3,5-Triaza-7-phosphaadamantane
- Except where otherwise noted, data are given for materials in their standard state (at 25 °C [77 °F], 100 kPa). verify (what is ?) Infobox references

Hexamethylenetetramine (HMTA), also known as 1,3,5,7-tetraazaadamantane, is a heterocyclic organic compound with diverse applications. It has the chemical formula (CH_{2})_{6}N_{4} and is a white crystalline compound that is highly soluble in water and polar organic solvents. It is useful in the synthesis of other organic compounds, including plastics, pharmaceuticals, explosives, and rubber additives. The compound is also used medically for certain conditions. It sublimes in vacuum at 280 °C. It has a tetrahedral cage-like structure similar to adamantane. The four vertices are occupied by nitrogen atoms, which are linked by methylene groups. Although the molecular shape defines a cage, no void space is available at the interior.

== Synthesis, structure, reactivity ==
Hexamethylenetetramine was discovered by Aleksandr Butlerov in 1859. It is prepared industrially by combining formaldehyde and ammonia:

The molecule behaves like an amine base, undergoing protonation and as a ligand. N-alkylation with chloroallyl chloride gives quaternium-15.

== Applications ==
The dominant use of hexamethylenetetramine is in the production of solid (powder) or liquid phenolic resins and phenolic resin moulding compounds, in which it is added as a hardening component. These products are used as binders, e.g. in brake and clutch linings, abrasives, non-woven textiles, formed parts produced by moulding processes, and fireproof materials.

=== Medical uses ===
The compound is also used medically as a urinary antiseptic and antibacterial medication under the name methenamine or hexamine. It is used as an alternative to antibiotics to prevent urinary tract infections (UTIs) and is sold under the brand names Hiprex, Urex, and Urotropin, among others.

As the mandelic acid salt (methenamine mandelate) or the hippuric acid salt (methenamine hippurate), it is used for the treatment of urinary tract infections. In an acidic environment, methenamine is believed to act as an antimicrobial by converting to formaldehyde. A systematic review of its use for this purpose in adult women found there was insufficient evidence of benefit and further research was needed. A UK study showed that methenamine is as effective as daily low-dose antibiotics at preventing UTIs among women who experience recurrent UTIs. As methenamine is an antiseptic, it may avoid the issue of antibiotic resistance.

Methenamine acts as an over-the-counter antiperspirant due to the astringent property of formaldehyde.

=== Histological stains ===
Methenamine silver stains are used for staining in histology, including the following types:

- Grocott's methenamine silver stain, used widely as a screen for fungal organisms.
- Jones' stain, a methenamine silver-Periodic acid-Schiff that stains for basement membrane, availing to view the "spiked" Glomerular basement membrane associated with membranous glomerulonephritis.

=== Solid fuel ===
Together with 1,3,5-trioxane, hexamethylenetetramine is a component of hexamine fuel tablets used by campers, hobbyists, the military and relief organizations for heating camping food or military rations. It burns smokelessly, has a high energy density of 30.0 megajoules per kilogram (MJ/kg), does not liquify while burning, and leaves no ashes, although its fumes are toxic.

Standardized 0.149 g tablets of methenamine (hexamine) are used by fire-protection laboratories as a clean and reproducible fire source to test the flammability of carpets and rugs.

=== Food additive ===
Hexamethylenetetramine or hexamine is also used as a food additive as a preservative (INS number 239). It is approved for usage for this purpose in the EU, where it is listed under E number E239, however it is not approved in the USA, Russia, Australia, or New Zealand.

=== Reagent in organic chemistry ===
Hexamethylenetetramine is a versatile reagent in organic synthesis. It is used in the Duff reaction (formylation of arenes), the Sommelet reaction (converting benzyl halides to aldehydes), and in the Delepine reaction (synthesis of amines from alkyl halides).

=== Explosives ===
Hexamethylenetetramine is the base component to produce RDX and, consequently, C-4 as well as octogen (a co-product with RDX), hexamine dinitrate, hexamine diperchlorate, HMTD, and R-salt.

From October 2023, sale of hexamethylenetetramine in the UK is restricted to licensed persons (as a "regulated precursor" under the terms of the Poisons Act 1972).

=== Pyrotechnics ===
Hexamethylenetetramine is also used in pyrotechnics to reduce combustion temperatures and decrease the color intensity of various fireworks. Because of its ash-free combustion, hexamethylenetetramine is also utilized in indoor fireworks alongside magnesium and lithium salts.

== Historical uses ==
Hexamethylenetetramine was first introduced into the medical setting in 1895 as a urinary antiseptic. It was officially approved by the FDA for medical use in the United States in 1967. However, it was only used in cases of acidic urine, whereas boric acid was used to treat urinary tract infections with alkaline urine. Scientist De Eds found that there was a direct correlation between the acidity of hexamethylenetetramine's environment and the rate of its decomposition. Therefore, its effectiveness as a drug depended greatly on the acidity of the urine rather than the amount of the drug administered. In an alkaline environment, hexamethylenetetramine was found to be almost completely inactive.

Hexamethylenetetramine was also used as a method of treatment for soldiers exposed to phosgene in World War I. Subsequent studies have shown that large doses of hexamethylenetetramine provide some protection if taken before phosgene exposure but none if taken afterwards.

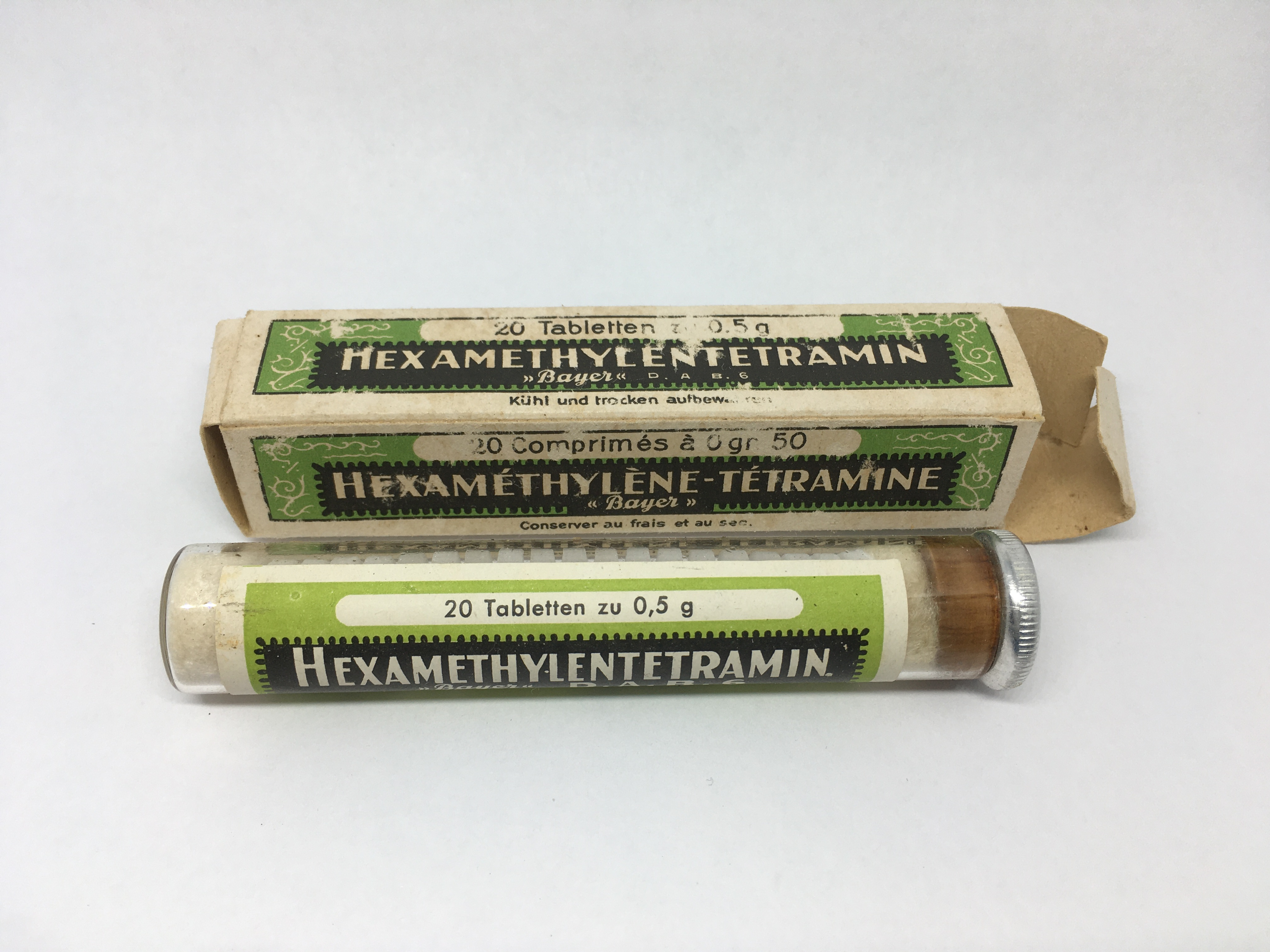
Hexamethylenetetramine from Bayer (IG Farben)

== Producers ==
Since 1990 the number of European producers has been declining. The French SNPE factory closed in 1990; in 1993, the production of hexamethylenetetramine in Leuna, Germany ceased; in 1996, the Italian facility of Agrolinz closed down; in 2001, the UK producer Borden closed; in 2006, production at Chemko, Slovak Republic, was closed. Remaining producers include INEOS in Germany, Caldic in the Netherlands, and Hexion in Italy. In the US, Eli Lilly and Company stopped producing methenamine tablets in 2002. In Australia, Hexamine Tablets for fuel are made by Thales Australia Ltd. In México, Hexamine is produced by Abiya. Many other countries who still produce this include Russia, Saudi Arabia, and China.

== Occurrence ==
In 2020, NASA announced that hexamethylenetetramine had been found in the Murchison, Murray and Tagish Lake meteorites.
