= Pseudo-panspermia =

Supported hypothesis for the origin of life

Pseudo-panspermia (sometimes called soft panspermia, molecular panspermia or quasi-panspermia) is a well-supported hypothesis for a stage in the origin of life. The theory first asserts that many of the small organic molecules used for life originated in space (for example, being incorporated in the solar nebula, from which the planets condensed). It continues that these organic molecules were distributed to planetary surfaces, where life then emerged on Earth and perhaps on other planets. Pseudo-panspermia differs from the fringe theory of panspermia, which asserts that life arrived on Earth from distant planets.

== Background ==
Some stages in the origin of life are well-understood, such as the habitable Earth and the abiotic synthesis of simple molecules, whether in space or on Earth. Later stages remain more speculative.

Theories of the origin of life have been recorded since the 5th century BC, when the Greek philosopher Anaxagoras proposed an initial version of panspermia: life arrived on earth from the heavens. In modern times, full panspermia has little support amongst mainstream scientists. Pseudo-panspermia, in which molecules are formed and transported through space is, however, well-supported.

== Extraterrestrial creation of organic molecules ==
Interstellar molecules are formed by chemical reactions within very sparse interstellar or circumstellar clouds of dust and gas. Usually this occurs when a molecule becomes ionised, often as the result of an interaction with cosmic rays. This positively charged molecule then draws in a nearby reactant by electrostatic attraction of the neutral molecule's electrons. Molecules can also be generated by reactions between neutral atoms and molecules, although this process is generally slower. The dust plays a critical role of shielding the molecules from the ionizing effect of ultraviolet radiation emitted by stars. The Murchison meteorite contains the organic molecules uracil and xanthine, which must therefore already have been present in the early Solar System, where they could have played a role in the origin of life.

Nitriles, key molecular precursors of the RNA World scenario, are among the most abundant chemical families in the universe and have been found in molecular clouds in the center of the Milky Way, protostars of different masses, meteorites and comets, and also in the atmosphere of Titan, the largest moon of Saturn.

Evidence for the extraterrestrial creation of organic molecules includes both their discovery in various contexts in space, and their laboratory synthesis under extraterrestrial conditions:

Extraterrestrial organic molecules found in space
Molecule	Class	Body	Notes
Glycine	Amino acid	Comet	NASA, 2009
	mixed aromatic-aliphatic compounds	Cosmic dust	2011
Glycolaldehyde	Sugar-related	Around a protostar	Copenhagen University, 2012 Precursor of RNA
Cyanomethanimine, Ethanimine	Imines	Icy particles in interstellar space	Precursors of nucleobase adenine, and of amino acid alanine
	polycyclic aromatic hydrocarbons (PAHs)	widespread, 20% of carbon in universe	NASA, 2014
Glycine, Methylamine, Ethylamine	Amino acid, amines	Coma of comet 67P/Churyumov-Gerasimenko	Rosetta Mission, 2016
Uracil, Niacin	Nucleobase, vitamer	162173 Ryugu	Hayabusa2, 2023

Laboratory syntheses under extraterrestrial conditions
Molecule	Class	Conditions	Notes
	Precursors of amino acids and nucleotides	Interstellar medium	NASA, 2012, starting from polycyclic aromatic hydrocarbons (PAHs)
Uracil, Cytosine, Thymine	Nucleobases	Pyrimidine, outer space	NASA, 2015
Oligoglycines	Peptides	Low-temperature areas of outer space	Initial materials are CO, C, and NH_{3}, common in molecular clouds of the interstellar medium

== Planetary distribution of organic molecules ==
Organic molecules can then be distributed to planets including Earth both when the planets formed and later. If the materials from which planets formed contained organic molecules, and were not destroyed by heat or other processes, then these would be available for abiogenesis on those planets.

Later distribution is by means of bodies such as comets and asteroids. These may fall to the planetary surface as meteorites, releasing any molecules they are carrying as they vaporise on impact or later as they erode.

Studies of rock and dust from asteroid Bennu delivered to Earth by NASA's OSIRIS-REx have revealed molecules that, on Earth, are key to life, as well as a history of saltwater.

Findings of organic molecules in meteorites include:

Organic molecules found in meteorites
Molecule	Class	Notes
Adenine, Guanine	Nucleobase	NASA, 2011
	Sugars	In "primitive meteorites"
Guanine, Adenine, Cytosine, Uracil, Thymine	Nucleobases	2022

Large asteroids with ice and organic chemicals
Asteroid	Location	Notes
24 Themis	Asteroid Belt	NASA, Jet Propulsion Laboratory, Near Earth Objects, life on Earth
269 Justitia	Asteroid Belt	NASA, JPL Small-Body Database
