= Murray meteorite =

Meteorite found in Kentucky

Murray
- Type: Chondrite
- Class: Carbonaceous chondrite
- Group: CM2
- Shock stage: S1
- Country: United States
- Region: Kentucky
- Coordinates: 36°36′N 88°6′W
- Observed fall: Yes
- Fall date: 20 September 1950
- TKW: 12.6 kilograms (28 lb)
- Strewn field: Yes
- Alternative names: Murray County

The Murray meteorite is a CM2-type carbonaceous chondrite that exploded more than 45 km above western Kentucky in the early morning of 20 September 1950.

== History ==
On 20 September 1950 at approximately 1:35 a.m. local time, near Jasper County, Illinois, a red-orange fireball was seen travelling south. About five seconds later, the fireball exploded with a 'blinding flash' at a height of over 45 km above western Kentucky. The sound of the explosion was heard over a thousand-square-mile area. A shower of fragments fell to Earth in Calloway County, Kentucky near Wildcat Creak, Kentucky Lake 9 miles east of Murray. A search was made on 22 October 1950 by a party from Vanderbilt University but only a few small pieces were found, other pieces were found by local farmers.

== Classification and composition ==
The Murray meteorite is an CM2 carbonaceous chondrite with 58.8 matrix and 0.96% insoluble organic matter. Silicon carbide grains found in the Murray meteorite had anomalous isotope ratios of silicon, carbon and nitrogen. This suggests that the grains formed before our Solar System existed, possibly in the atmospheres of red giant stars.

== Organic matter ==
17 amino acids were found in the Murray meteorite in 1971. Only six of these amino acids were proteinogenic amino acids. By 2001, the list of organic materials identified in the meteorite was extended to include polyols. In 2020 NASA announced that hexamethylenetetramine had been found in the Murchison, Murray and Tagish Lake meteorites. Purine and pyrimidine nucleobases have been detected in parts-per-billion in a 2022 study of the Murchison, Murray and Tagish Lake meteorites. nicotinic acid (626ppb), isonicotinic acid (307ppb), 1-Methyl-1H-imidazole-5-carboxylic acid (a thymine isomer, 100ppb) and 4-Imidazole carboxylic acid (a uracil isomer, 99ppb) were the most abundant N-heterocycles found in the Murray sample.
