= Diamino acid =

In chemistry, a diamino acid, also called a diamino carboxylic acid, is a molecule including a carboxylic acid and two amine functional groups. Diamino acids belong to the class of amino acids.

== Biochemical function ==
Lysine is a proteinaceous diamino acid (i.e. a component of proteins), and is accordingly coded by codons of the genetic material. In the pH range found inside living cells, both the amino groups are protonated, and they can be classified therefore as cationic amino acids.

Ornithine is a non-proteinogenic diamino acid.

In biochemistry, diamino acids are of particular interest. Diamino acids are used for the synthesis of specific peptide nucleic acids, such as daPNA. Artificial peptide nucleic acids are capable of forming duplex structures with individual DNA- and RNA-strands and are, therefore, not only called DNA-analog, but also they are considered as candidates for the first genetic material on Earth. The corresponding diamino acids such as 2,3-diaminopropanoic acid were detected in the Murchison meteorite and in a simulated comet.
