= Tagish Lake (meteorite) =

Stony meteorite

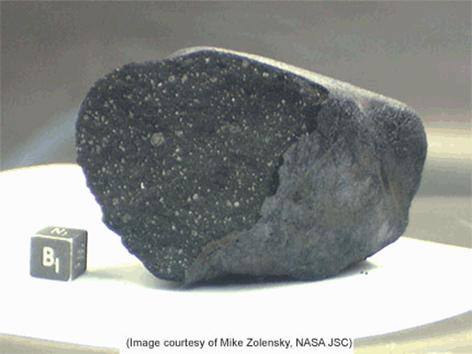
- A 159 gram fragment of the Tagish Lake meteorite
- Type: Chondrite
- Class: Carbonaceous chondrite
- Group: C2 ungrouped
- Shock stage: S1
- Country: Canada
- Region: The Yukon
- Coordinates: 59°42′16″N 134°12′5″W
- Observed fall: Yes
- Fall date: January 18, 2000; 08:43:42 pst
- TKW: >10 kilograms (22 lb)
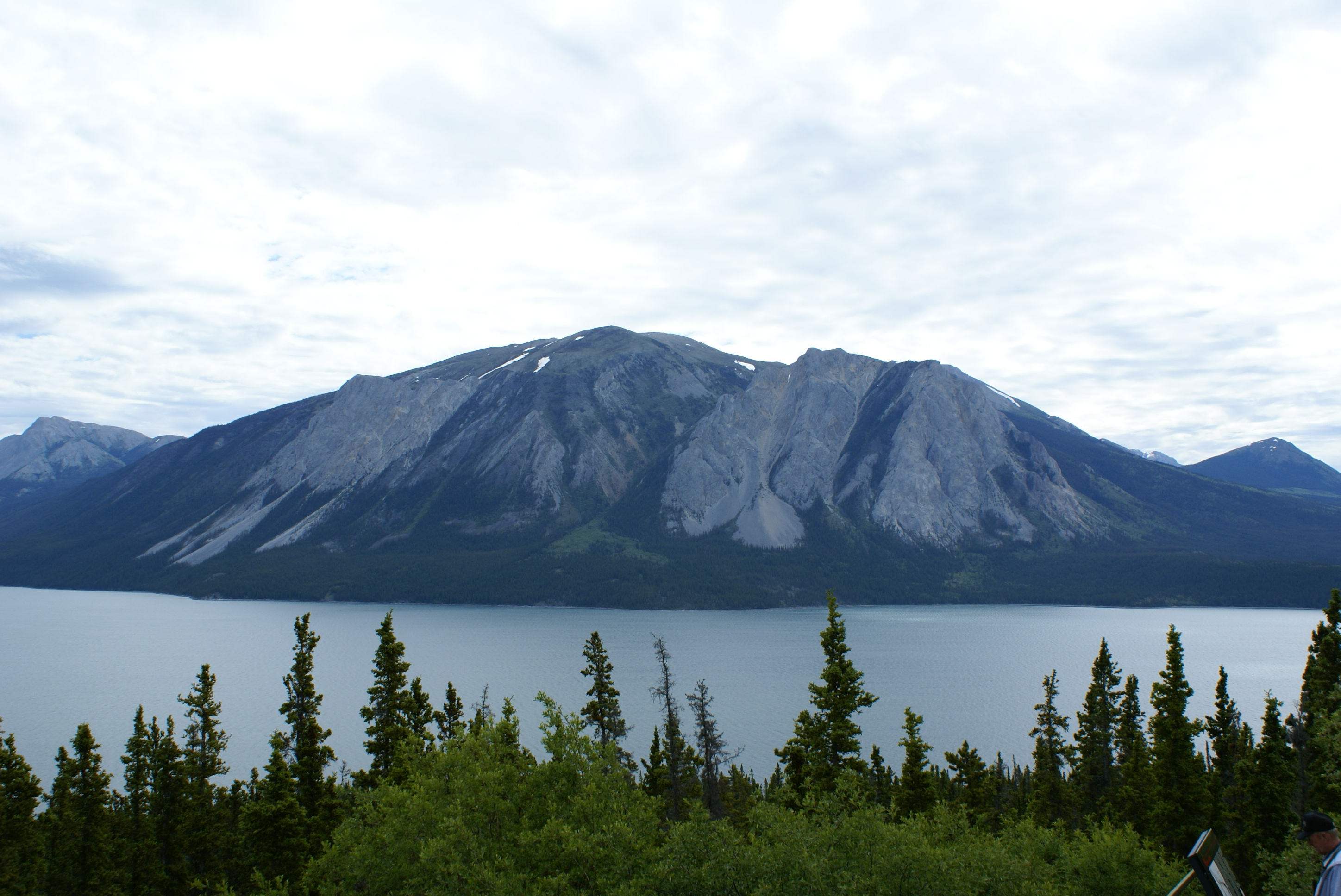
- Tagish Lake in northwestern British Columbia, the site of the "Tagish Lake" meteorite fall

The Tagish Lake meteorite fell at 16:43 UTC on 18 January 2000 in the Tagish Lake area in northwestern British Columbia, Canada.

== History ==
Fragments of the Tagish Lake meteorite landed upon the Earth on January 18, 2000, at 16:43 UT (08:43 local time in Yukon) after a large meteoroid exploded in the upper atmosphere at altitudes of 50–30 kilometres (31–19 mi) with an estimated total energy release of about 1.7 kilotons of TNT. Following the reported sighting of a fireball in southern Yukon and northern British Columbia, Canada, more than 500 fragments of the meteorite were collected from the lake's frozen surface. Post-event atmospheric photographs of the trail left by the associated fireball and U.S. Department of Defense satellite information yielded the meteor trajectory. Most of the stony, carbonaceous fragments landed on the Taku Arm of the lake, coming to rest on the lake's frozen surface. The passage of the fireball and the high-altitude explosion set off a wide array of satellite sensors as well as seismographs.

The local inhabitants described the smell in the air following the airburst as sulfurous and many first thought the blast was caused by a missile.

== Meteoroid ==
The Tagish Lake meteoroid is estimated to have been 4 m (13 ft) in diameter and 56 tonnes (60 short tons; 123,460 lb) in weight before it entered the Earth's atmosphere. However, it is estimated that only 1.3 tonnes remained after ablation in the upper atmosphere and several fragmentation events, meaning that around 97% of the meteorite had vaporised, mainly becoming stratospheric dust that was seen as noctilucent clouds to the northwest of Edmonton at sunset, some 12 hours after the event. Of the 1.3 tonnes of fragmented rock, somewhat over 10 kilograms (22 lb) (about 1%) was found and collected.

== Specimens ==
Tagish Lake is classified as a carbonaceous chondrite, type C2 ungrouped. The pieces of the Tagish Lake meteorite are dark grey to almost black in colour with small light-coloured inclusions, and a maximum size of ~2.3 kg. Except for a greyish fusion crust, the meteorites have the visual appearance of a charcoal briquette. The fragments were transported in their frozen state to research facilities after they were collected by a local resident in late January, 2000. Initial studies of these fresh fragments were done in collaboration with researchers from NASA. Snowfall covered the remaining fragments until April 2000, when a search effort was mounted by researchers from the University of Calgary and University of Western Ontario. These later fragments were mostly found to have sunk into the ice by a few cm to more than 20 cm, and had to be collected out of meltwater holes, or cut in icy blocks from the frozen surface of Tagish Lake.

Fragments of the fresh, "pristine" Tagish Lake meteorite totaling more than 850 g are currently held in the collections at the Royal Ontario Museum and the University of Alberta. "Degraded" fragments from the April–May 2000 search are curated mainly at the University of Calgary and the University of Western Ontario.

== Analysis and classification ==
Analyses have shown that Tagish Lake fragments are of a primitive type, containing unchanged stellar dust granules that may have been part of the cloud of material that created the Solar System and Sun. This meteorite shows some similarities to the two most primitive carbonaceous chondrite types, the CI and CM chondrites; it is nevertheless quite distinct from either of them. Tagish Lake has a much lower density than any other type of chondrite and is actually composed of two somewhat different rock types. The major difference between the two lithologies is in the abundance of carbonate minerals; one is poor in carbonates and the other is rich in them.

The meteorite contains an abundance of organic materials, including amino acids. The organics in the meteorite may have originally formed in the interstellar medium and/or the solar protoplanetary disk, but were subsequently modified in the meteorites' asteroidal parent bodies.

A portion of the carbon in the Tagish Lake meteorite is contained in what are called nanodiamonds—very tiny diamond grains at most only a few micrometers in size. In fact, Tagish Lake contains more of the nanodiamonds than any other meteorite.

As with many carbonaceous chondrites, and Type 2 specimens in particular, Tagish Lake contains water. The meteorite contains water-bearing serpentinite and saponite phyllosilicates; gypsum has been found, but may be weathering of meteoritic sulfides. The water is not Earthly contamination but isotopically different from terrestrial water.

In 2020, NASA announced that hexamethylenetetramine had been found in the Murchison, Murray and Tagish Lake meteorites.

Purine and pyrimidine nucleobases have been detected in parts-per-billion in a 2022 study of the Murchison, Murray and Tagish Lake meteorites. Isonicotinic acid (118ppb), nicotinic acid (108ppb) and imidazole (82ppb) were the most abundant N-heterocycles found in the Tagish Lake sample.

The age of the meteorite is estimated to be about 4.55 billion years thus being a remainder of the period when the solar system was formed.

== Origin ==
Based on eyewitness accounts of the fireball caused by the incoming meteor and on the calibrated photographs of the track which it had left behind and which was visible for about half an hour, scientists have managed to calculate the orbit it followed before it impacted with Earth. Although none of the photographs captured the fireball directly, the fireball path was reconstructed from two calibrated photos taken minutes after the event, giving the entry angle. Eyewitness accounts in the vicinity of Whitehorse, Yukon accurately constrained the ground track azimuth from either side. It was found that the Tagish Lake meteorite had a pre-entry Apollo type orbit that brought it from the outer reaches of the asteroid belt. Currently, there are only eleven meteorite falls with accurately determined pre-entry orbits, based on photographs or video recordings of the fireballs themselves taken from two or more different angles.

Further study of the reflectance spectrum of the meteorite indicate that it most likely originated from 773 Irmintraud, a D-type asteroid.

== Comparisons ==
The double, and not the expected single, plume formation of debris, as seen in video and photographs of the 2013 Chelyabinsk meteor dust trail and believed by Peter Brown to have coincided near the primary airburst location, was also pictured following the Tagish Lake fireball, and according to Brown, likely indicates where rising air quickly flowed into the center of the trail, essentially in the same manner as a moving 3D version of a mushroom cloud.

== See also ==
- Glossary of meteoritics
- 773 Irmintraud, the asteroid that the Tagish Lake meteorite most likely came from.
