= Northwest Africa 801 =

Meteorite found in Morocco

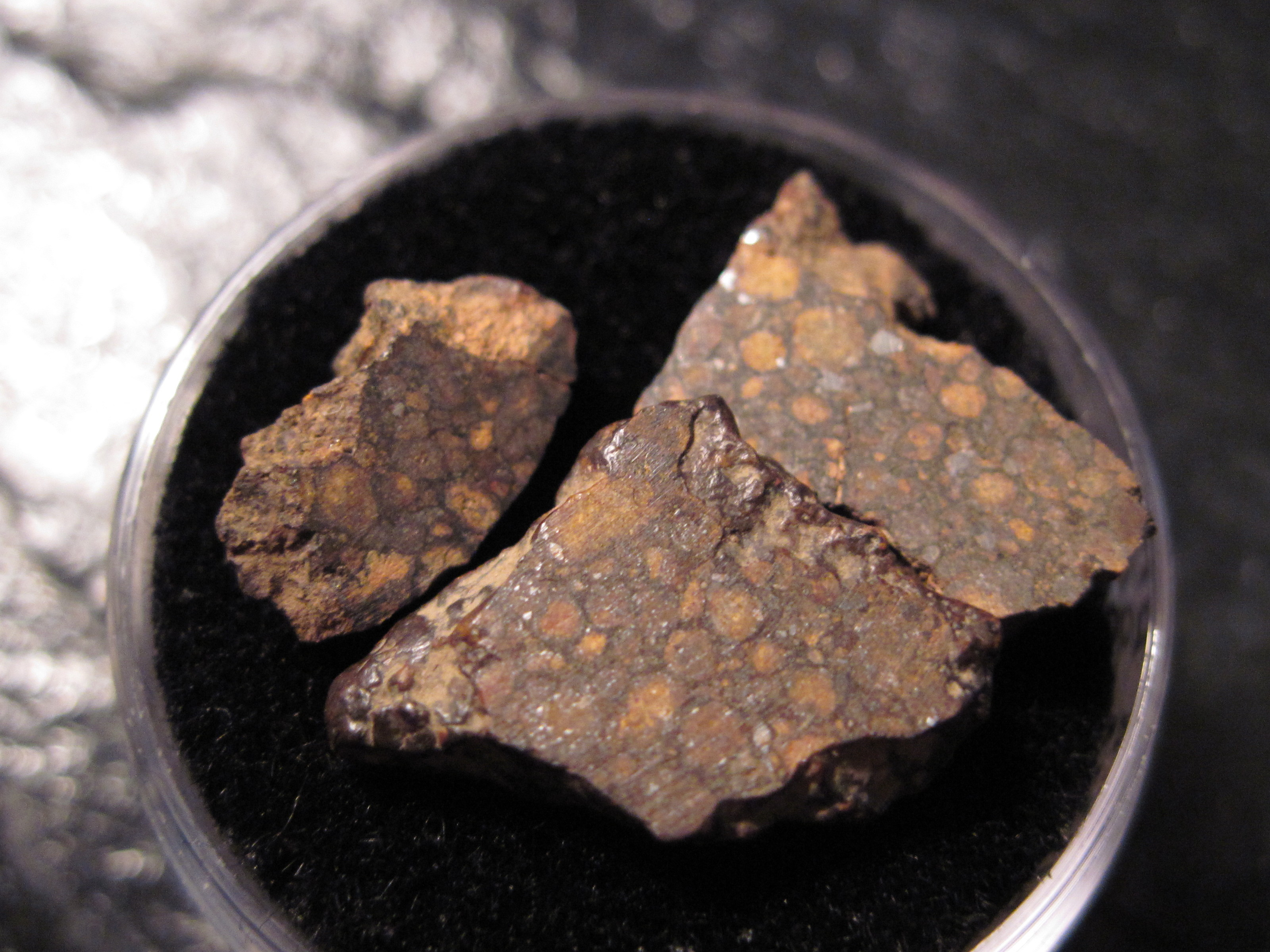
- NWA 801 meteorite sample. 2.51 grams of the rare CR2 Renazzo Carbonaceous Chondrite.
- Type: Chondrite
- Class: Carbonaceous chondrite
- Group: CR2
- Country: Morocco
- Observed fall: No
- Found date: 2001
- TKW: 5 kilograms (11 lb)

Northwest Africa 801 (NWA 801) is a carbonaceous chondrite meteorite found in 2001 in Morocco. It has a mass of 5kg and was purchased in Zagora, Morocco. At over 4.5 billions years old, it is older than the Earth. In November 2019, along with the Murchison meteorite it was the first to provide evidence of ribose in space and its transport to Earth, in an analysis of its composition by gas chromatography mass spectrometry. According to Yoshihiro Furukawa of Tohoku University, "the extraterrestrial sugar might have contributed to the formation of RNA on the prebiotic Earth which possibly led to the origin of life."
