= Panspermia =

Hypothesis on the interstellar spreading of primordial life

Panspermia proposes that organisms such as bacteria, complete with their DNA, could be transported by means such as comets through space to planets including Earth.

Panspermia (from Ancient Greek πᾶν (pan) 'all' and σπέρμα (sperma) 'seed') is the hypothesis that life exists throughout the universe, distributed by cosmic dust, meteoroids, asteroids, comets, and planetoids, as well as by spacecraft carrying unintended contamination by microorganisms, known as directed panspermia. The theory argues that life did not originate on Earth, but instead evolved somewhere else and seeded life as we know it.

Panspermia comes in many forms, such as radiopanspermia, lithopanspermia, and directed panspermia. Regardless of its form, the theories generally propose that microbes able to survive in outer space (such as certain types of bacteria or plant spores) can become trapped in debris ejected into space after collisions between planets and small Solar System bodies that harbor life. This debris containing the lifeforms is then transported by meteors between bodies in a planetary system, or even across planetary systems within a galaxy. In this way, panspermia studies concentrate not on how life began but on methods that may distribute it within the Universe. This point is often used as a criticism of the theory.

Panspermia is a fringe theory with little support amongst mainstream scientists. Critics argue that it does not answer the question of the origin of life but merely places it on another celestial body. It is further criticized because it cannot be tested experimentally. Historically, disputes over the merit of this theory centered on whether life is ubiquitous or emergent throughout the Universe. The theory maintains support today, with some work being done to develop mathematical treatments of how life might migrate naturally throughout the Universe. Its long history lends itself to extensive speculation and hoaxes that have arisen from meteoritic events.

In contrast, pseudo-panspermia is the well-supported hypothesis that many of the small organic molecules used for life originated in space, and were distributed to planetary surfaces.

== History ==
Panspermia has a history dating back to the 5th century BCE and the natural philosopher Anaxagoras. Classicists came to agree that Anaxagoras maintained the Universe (or Cosmos) was full of life, and that life on Earth started from the fall of these extra-terrestrial seeds. Panspermia as it is known today, however, is not identical to this original theory. The name, as applied to this theory, was only first coined in 1908 by Svante Arrhenius, a Swedish scientist. Prior to this, since around the 1860s, many prominent scientists were becoming interested in the theory. More recent advocates include Sir Fred Hoyle and Chandra Wickramasinghe.

In the 1860s, there were three scientific developments that began to bring the focus of the scientific community to the problem of the origin of life. Firstly, the Kant-Laplace Nebular theory of solar system and planetary formation was gaining favor, and implied that when the Earth first formed, the surface conditions would have been inhospitable to life as we know it. This meant that life must have arisen on Earth at a later date, without biological precursors. Secondly, Charles Darwin's famous theory of evolution implied some elusive origin, because in order for something to evolve, it must start somewhere. In his Origin of Species, Darwin was unable or unwilling to touch on this issue. Third and finally, Louis Pasteur and John Tyndall experimentally disproved the (now superseded) theory of spontaneous generation, which suggested that life was constantly arising from non-living matter and did not have a common ancestor, as suggested by Darwin's theory of evolution.

Altogether, these three developments in science presented the wider scientific community with a seemingly paradoxical situation regarding the origin of life: life must have arisen from non-biological precursors after the Earth was formed, and yet spontaneous generation as a theory had been experimentally disproved. From here is where the study of the origin of life branched. Those who accepted Pasteur's rejection of spontaneous generation began to develop the theory that under (unknown) conditions on a primitive Earth, life must have arisen from non-living material. This theory became known as abiogenesis, and is the currently accepted one. On the other side of this are those scientists of the time who rejected Pasteur's results and instead supported the idea that life on Earth came from existing life. This necessarily requires that life has always existed somewhere on some planet, and that it has a mechanism of transferring between planets. Thus, the modern treatment of panspermia began in earnest.

Lord Kelvin, in a presentation to The British Association for the Advancement of Science in 1871, proposed the idea that similarly to how seeds can be transferred through the air by winds, so can life be brought to Earth by the infall of a life-bearing meteorite. He further proposed the idea that life can only come from life, and that this principle is invariant under philosophical uniformitarianism, similar to how matter can neither be created nor destroyed. There would have always been planets spreading life throughout the universe because, he said, "we all confidently believe that there are at present, and have been from time immemorial, many worlds of life besides our own." This argument was heavily criticized because of its boldness, and additionally due to technical objections from the wider community. In particular, Johann Zollner from Germany argued against Kelvin by saying that organisms carried in meteorites to Earth would not survive the descent through the atmosphere due to friction heating.

The arguments went back and forth until Svante Arrhenius gave the theory its modern treatment and designation. Arrhenius argued against abiogenesis on the basis that it had no experimental foundation at the time, and believed that life had always existed somewhere in the Universe, arguing that "we may become accustomed to the idea that life is eternal, and hence that it is useless to inquire into its origin." He focused his efforts of developing the mechanism(s) by which this pervasive life may be transferred through the Universe. At this time, it was recently discovered that solar radiation can exert pressure, and thus force, on matter. Arrhenius thus concluded that it is possible that very small organisms such as bacterial spores could be moved around due to this radiation pressure.

At this point, panspermia as a theory now had a potentially viable transport mechanism, as well as a vehicle for carrying life from planet to planet. The theory still faced criticism mostly due to doubts about how long spores would actually survive under the conditions of their transport from one planet, through space, to another. Despite all the emphasis placed on trying to establish the scientific legitimacy of this theory, it still lacked testability; that was and still is a serious problem the theory has yet to overcome. Furthermore, as Dennis Danielson and Christopher M. Graney have pointed out, the theory is essentially based on the idea of an eternal, unchanging universe with no beginning and in which life is eternal, and not an evolving "Big Bang" universe.

Support for the theory persisted, however, with Fred Hoyle (famous for his opposition to the Big Bang Theory and for promoting his theory of an unchanging, "steady-state" universe) and Chandra Wickramasinghe using two reasons for why an extra-terrestrial origin of life might be preferred. First is that required conditions for the origin of life may have been more favorable somewhere other than Earth, and second that life on Earth exhibits properties that are not accounted for by assuming an endogenic origin. Hoyle studied spectra of interstellar dust, and came to the conclusion that space contained large amounts of organics, which he suggested were the building blocks of the more complex chemical structures. Critically, Hoyle argued that this chemical evolution was unlikely to have taken place on a prebiotic Earth, and instead the most likely candidate is a comet. Furthermore, Hoyle and Wickramasinghe concluded that the evolution of life requires a large increase in genetic information and diversity, which might have resulted from the influx of viral material from space via comets. Hoyle reported (in a lecture at Oxford on January 16, 1978) a pattern of coincidence between the arrival of major epidemics and the occasions of close encounters with comets, which led Hoyle to suggest that the epidemics were a direct result of material raining down from these comets. This claim in particular garnered criticism from biologists.

Since the 1970s, a new era of planetary exploration meant that data could be used to test panspermia and potentially transform it from conjecture to a testable theory. Though it has yet to be tested, panspermia is still explored today in some mathematical treatments, and as its long history suggests, the appeal of the theory has stood the test of time.

== Overview ==
=== Core requirements ===
Panspermia requires:

1. that organic molecules originated in space (perhaps to be distributed to Earth),
2. that life originated from these molecules, extraterrestrially,
3. that this extraterrestrial life was transported to Earth.

The creation and distribution of organic molecules from space is now uncontroversial; it is known as pseudo-panspermia. The jump from organic materials to life originating from space, however, is hypothetical and currently untestable.

=== Transport vessels ===
Bacterial spores and plant seeds are two common proposed vessels for panspermia. According to the theory, they could be encased in a meteorite and transported to another planet from their origin, subsequently descend through the atmosphere and populate the surface with life (see lithopanspermia below). This naturally requires that these spores and seeds have formed somewhere else, maybe even in space in the case of how panspermia deals with bacteria. Understanding of planetary formation theory and meteorites has led to the idea that some rocky bodies originating from undifferentiated parent bodies could be able to generate local conditions conducive to life. Hypothetically, internal heating from radiogenic isotopes could melt ice to provide water as well as energy. In fact, some meteorites have been found to show signs of aqueous alteration which may indicate that this process has taken place. Given that there are such large numbers of these bodies found within the Solar System, an argument can be made that they each provide a potential site for life to develop. A collision occurring in the asteroid belt could alter the orbit of one such site, and eventually deliver it to Earth.

Plant seeds can be an alternative transport vessel. Some plants produce seeds that are resistant to the conditions of space, which have been shown to lie dormant in extreme cold, vacuum, and resist short wavelength UV radiation. They are not typically proposed to have originated in space, but on another planet. Theoretically, even if a plant is partially damaged during its travel in space, the pieces could still seed life in a sterile environment. Sterility of the environment is relevant because it is unclear if the novel plant could out-compete existing life forms. This idea is based on previous evidence showing that cellular reconstruction can occur from cytoplasms released from damaged algae. Furthermore, plant cells contain obligate endosymbionts, which could be released into a new environment.

Though both plant seeds and bacterial spores have been proposed as potentially viable vehicles, their ability to not only survive in space for the required time, but also survive atmospheric entry is debated.

Space probes may be a viable transport mechanism for interplanetary cross-pollination within the Solar System. Space agencies have implemented planetary protection procedures to reduce the risk of planetary contamination, but microorganisms such as Tersicoccus phoenicis may be resistant to spacecraft assembly cleaning.

== Varieties of panspermia theory ==
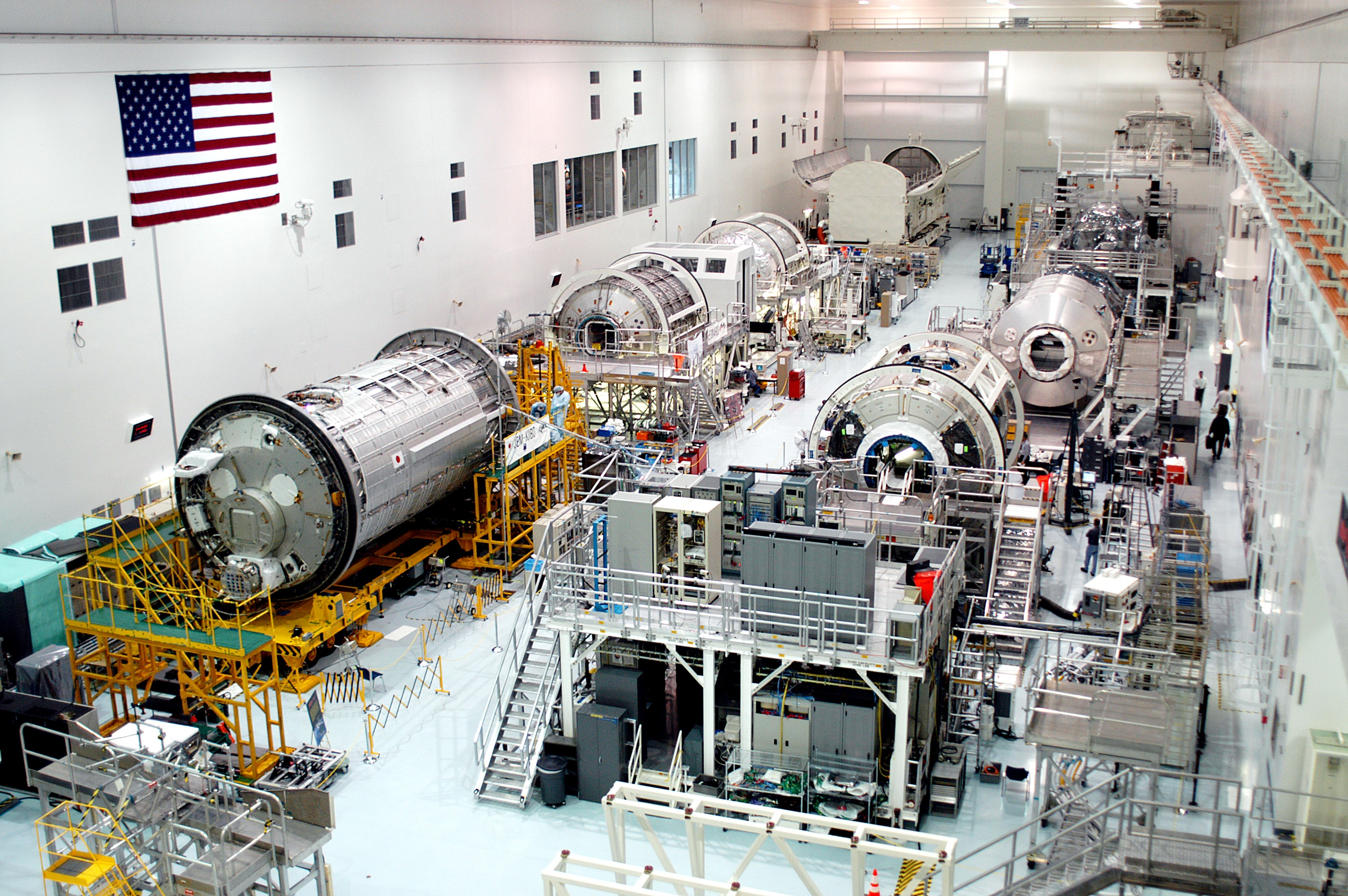
Some microbes appear able to survive the planetary protection procedures applied to spacecraft in cleanrooms, intended to prevent accidental planetary contamination.

Panspermia is generally subdivided into two classes: either transfer occurs between planets of the same system (interplanetary) or between stellar systems (interstellar). Further classifications are based on different proposed transport mechanisms, as follows.

=== Radiopanspermia ===
In 1903, Svante Arrhenius proposed radiopanspermia, the theory that singular microscopic forms of life can be propagated in space, driven by the radiation pressure from stars. This is the mechanism by which light can exert a force on matter. Arrhenius argued that particles at a critical size below 1.5 μm would be propelled at high speed by radiation pressure of a star. However, because its effectiveness decreases with increasing size of the particle, this mechanism holds for very tiny particles only, such as single bacterial spores.

==== Counterarguments ====
The main criticism of radiopanspermia came from Iosif Shklovsky and Carl Sagan, who cited evidence for the lethal action of space radiation (UV and X-rays) in the cosmos.

Data gathered by the orbital experiments ERA, BIOPAN, EXOSTACK and EXPOSE showed that isolated spores, including those of B. subtilis, were rapidly killed if exposed to the full space environment for merely a few seconds, but if shielded against solar UV, the spores were capable of surviving in space for up to six years while embedded in clay or meteorite powder (artificial meteorites). Spores would therefore need to be heavily protected against UV radiation: exposure of unprotected DNA to solar UV and cosmic ionizing radiation would break it up into its constituent bases. Rocks at least 1 meter in diameter are required to effectively shield resistant microorganisms, such as bacterial spores against galactic cosmic radiation. Additionally, exposing DNA to the ultrahigh vacuum of space alone is sufficient to cause DNA damage, so the transport of unprotected DNA or RNA during interplanetary flights powered solely by light pressure is extremely unlikely.

The feasibility of other means of transport for the more massive shielded spores into the outer Solar System—for example, through gravitational capture by comets—is unknown. There is little evidence in full support of the radiopanspermia hypothesis.

=== Lithopanspermia ===
This transport mechanism generally arose following the growth of planetary science with the discovery of exoplanets and the sudden availability of data. Lithopanspermia is the proposed transfer of organisms in rocks from one planet to another through planetary objects such as in comets or asteroids; it remains speculative. A variant would be for organisms to travel between star systems on nomadic exoplanets or exomoons.

Although there is no concrete evidence that lithopanspermia has occurred in the Solar System, the various stages have become amenable to experimental testing.

- Planetary ejection – For lithopanspermia to occur, microorganisms must first survive ejection from a planetary surface (assuming they do not form on meteorites, as suggested in), which involves extreme forces of acceleration and shock with associated temperature rises. Hypothetical values of shock pressures experienced by ejected rocks are obtained from Martian meteorites, which suggest pressures of approximately 5 to 55 GPa, acceleration of 3 Mm/s^{2}, jerk of 6 million km/s^{3} and post-shock temperature increases of about 1 K to 1000 K. Though these conditions are extreme, some organisms appear able to survive them.
- Survival in transit – Once in space, the microorganisms have to make it to their next destination for lithopanspermia to be successful. The survival of microorganisms has been studied extensively using both simulated facilities and in low Earth orbit. A large number of microorganisms have been selected for exposure experiments, both human-borne microbes (significant for future crewed missions) and extremophiles (significant for determining the physiological requirements of survival in space). Bacteria in particular can exhibit a survival mechanism whereby a colony generates a biofilm that enhances its protection against UV radiation.
- Atmospheric entry – The final stage of lithopanspermia, is re-entry onto a viable planet via its atmosphere. This requires that the organisms are able to further survive potential atmospheric ablation. Tests of this stage could use sounding rockets and orbital vehicles. B. subtilis spores inoculated onto granite domes were twice subjected to hypervelocity atmospheric transit by launch to a ~120 km altitude on an Orion two-stage rocket. The spores survived on the sides of the rock, but not on the forward-facing surface that reached 145 °C. As photosynthetic organisms must be close to the surface of a rock to obtain sufficient light energy, atmospheric transit might act as a filter against them by ablating the surface layers of the rock. Although cyanobacteria can survive the desiccating, freezing conditions of space, the STONE experiment showed that they cannot survive atmospheric entry. Small non-photosynthetic organisms deep within rocks might survive the exit and entry process, including impact survival.

Lithopanspermia, described by the mechanism above, can be either interplanetary or interstellar. It is possible to quantify panspermia models and treat them as viable mathematical theories. For example, a recent study of planets of the Trappist-1 planetary system presents a model for estimating the probability of interplanetary panspermia, similar to studies in the past done about Earth-Mars panspermia. This study found that lithopanspermia is 'orders of magnitude more likely to occur' in the Trappist-1 system as opposed to the Earth-to-Mars scenario. According to their analysis, the increase in probability of lithopanspermia is linked to an increased probability of abiogenesis amongst the Trappist-1 planets. In a way, these modern treatments attempt to keep panspermia as a contributing factor to abiogenesis, as opposed to a theory that directly opposes it. In line with this, it is suggested that if biosignatures could be detected on two (or more) adjacent planets, that would provide evidence that panspermia is a potentially required mechanism for abiogenesis. As of yet, no such discovery has been made.

Lithopanspermia has also been hypothesized to operate between stellar systems. One mathematical analysis, estimating the total number of rocky or icy objects that could potentially be captured by planetary systems within the Milky Way, has concluded that lithopanspermia is not necessarily bound to a single stellar system. This not only requires these objects have life in the first place, but also that it survives the journey. Thus intragalactic lithopanspermia is heavily dependent on the survival lifetime of organisms, as well as the velocity of the transporter. Again, there is no evidence that such a process has, or can occur.

==== Counterarguments ====
The complex nature of the requirements for lithopanspermia, as well as evidence against the longevity of bacteria being able to survive under these conditions, makes lithopanspermia a difficult theory to support. That being said, impact events did occur often in the early solar system and still occur today, such as within the asteroid belt.

=== Directed panspermia ===
First proposed in 1972 by Nobel prize winner Francis Crick along with Leslie Orgel, directed panspermia is the theory that life was deliberately brought to Earth by a higher intelligent being from another planet. In light of the evidence at the time that it seems unlikely for an organism to have been delivered to Earth via radiopanspermia or lithopanspermia, Crick and Orgel proposed this as an alternative theory, though it is worth noting that Orgel was less serious about the claim. They do acknowledge that the scientific evidence is lacking, but discuss what kinds of evidence would be needed to support the theory. In a similar vein, Thomas Gold suggested that life on Earth might have originated accidentally from a pile of 'Cosmic Garbage' dumped on Earth long ago by extraterrestrial beings. These theories are often considered more science fiction, however, Crick and Orgel use the principle of cosmic reversibility to argue for it.

This principle is based on the argument that if humans could infect a sterile planet, as was assumed to be a possibility in the foreseeable future, then another technological society could have done the same on Earth in the distant past. Crick and Orgel further argued that given the universality of the genetic code, it follows that an infective theory for life is plausible.

Directed panspermia could, in theory, be demonstrated by finding a distinctive 'signature' message had been deliberately implanted into either the genome or the genetic code of the first microorganisms by our hypothetical progenitor, some 4 billion years ago. However, there is no known mechanism that could prevent mutation and natural selection from removing such a message over long periods of time.

==== Counterarguments ====
In 1972, both abiogenesis and panspermia were seen as viable theories by different experts. Given this, Crick and Orgel argued that experimental evidence required to validate one theory over the other was lacking. That being said, evidence strongly in favor of abiogenesis over panspermia exists today, whereas evidence for panspermia, particularly directed panspermia, is decidedly lacking.

=== Origination and distribution of organic molecules: Pseudo-panspermia ===
Pseudo-panspermia is the well-supported hypothesis that many of the small organic molecules used for life originated in space, and were distributed to planetary surfaces. Life then emerged on Earth, and perhaps on other planets, by the processes of abiogenesis. Evidence for pseudo-panspermia includes the discovery of organic compounds such as sugars, amino acids, and nucleobases in meteorites and other extraterrestrial bodies, and the formation of similar compounds in the laboratory under outer space conditions. A prebiotic polyester system has been explored as an example.

== Hoaxes and speculations ==
=== Orgueil meteorite ===
On May 14, 1864, twenty fragments from a meteorite crashed into the French city of Orgueil. A separate fragment of the Orgueil meteorite (kept in a sealed glass jar since its discovery) was found in 1965 to have a seed capsule embedded in it, while the original glassy layer on the outside remained undisturbed. Despite great initial excitement, the seed was found to be that of a European Juncaceae or rush plant that had been glued into the fragment and camouflaged using coal dust. The outer "fusion layer" was in fact glue. While the perpetrator of this hoax is unknown, it is thought that they sought to influence the 19th-century debate on spontaneous generation—rather than panspermia—by demonstrating the transformation of inorganic to biological matter.

=== Oumuamua ===
In 2017, the Pan-STARRS telescope in Hawaii detected a reddish object with significant, periodic fluctiations in albedo, strongly suggestive of a slender, rotating object. Analysis of its orbit provided evidence that it was an interstellar object, originating from outside the Solar System, accelerating away from the Sun with the absence of the visible outgassing that usually explains the acceleration of asteroids. Astronomer Avi Loeb argues that there are no satisfying natural explanations for this acceleration, and proposes that Oumuamua may be a solar sail, which would be partial evidence for the feasibility of directed panspermia. This claim has been considered unlikely by other authors.

== See also ==
- Abiogenesis – Life arising from non-living matter
- Astrobiology – Science concerned with life in the universe
- Cryptobiosis – Metabolic state of life
- Interplanetary contamination – Biological contamination of a planetary body by a space probe or spacecraft
- List of microorganisms tested in outer space
- Planetary protection – Prevention of interplanetary biological contamination
